= Lakshman Singh Rawat =

Indian Army general

Lieutenant General Lakshman Singh Rawat PVSM, AVSM
- Born: November 1930; Sainj Village, Pauri Garhwal District, United Provinces of Agra and Oudh, British India (now Uttarakhand)
- Died: 11 February 2015 (aged 84)
- Children: General Bipin Rawat; Colonel Vijay Rawat
- Relatives: Kishan Singh Parmar, an ex-MLA from Uttarkashi (father-in-law)
- Military career
- Allegiance: India
- Branch: Indian Army
- Service years: 1951–1988
- Rank: Lieutenant General
- Unit: 3/11 Gorkha Rifles
- Commands: X Corps; Maharashtra & Gujarat Area; 19th Infantry Division; 5/11 Gorkha Rifles
- Awards: Param Vishisht Seva Medal; Ati Vishisht Seva Medal

Lieutenant General Lakshman Singh Rawat, PVSM, AVSM (November 1930 – 11 February 2015) was a General Officer in the Indian Army. He last served as the Deputy Chief of the Army Staff, from 1987 to 1988. His son, General Bipin Rawat was India's first Chief of the Defence Staff and was the 26th Chief of the Army Staff.

== Early life ==
Rawat was born in November 1930 in the Sainj village of the Pauri Garhwal district to a Hindu Garhwali Rajput family. His father was a soldier in the Indian Army. Apart from Rawat, his brothers Bharat and Harinandan both served in the ranks of the Indian Army.

== Military career ==
Rawat was commissioned as a second lieutenant in the 3rd battalion, The 11th Gorkha Rifles (3/11 GR). He later commanded the 5th battalion of the 11th Gorkha Rifles (5/11 GR). His son Bipin would later be commissioned into this unit and go on to command it. In the rank of Colonel, Rawat served with the Indian Military Training Team (IMTRAT) in Bhutan from 1970 to 1972. Promoted to the rank of Brigadier, he commanded an infantry brigade from 1973 to 1976. He subsequently served as the Brigadier Administration (Brig Adm) at the headquarters of the recently formed Northern Command. After a two-year stint as Brig Adm, he was appointed Director National Cadet Corps (NCC), Uttar Pradesh, in November 1978.

=== General officer ===
In 1980, Rawat was promoted to the rank of major general and appointed general officer commanding (GOC) 19th Infantry Division. He commanded the division for over two years which was based in Jammu and Kashmir. For his command of the division, on 26 January 1981, he was awarded the Ati Vishisht Seva Medal.

Rawat subsequently was appointed GOC Maharashtra and Gujarat Area, a static formation, which he commanded for about three years. In June 1985, he was promoted to the rank of lieutenant general and appointed GOC X Corps, headquartered at Bathinda. He also took over as the Colonel of the 11th Gorkha Rifles. After a year-long tenure commanding X Corps, he moved to headquarters Southern Command as the Chief of Staff. He served as the Chief of Staff for till November 1987.

On 30 November 1987, Rawat moved to Army HQ, after being appointed Deputy Chief of the Army Staff (DCOAS). He also took over as the president of the Gorkha Brigade. After a year-long stint as DCOAS, he retired from the Army. On 26 January 1989, he was awarded the Param Vishisht Seva Medal for distinguished service of the most exceptional order.

== Personal life ==
Rawat married the daughter of Kishan Singh Parmar, an ex-Member of the Legislative Assembly (MLA) from Uttarkashi. The couple had two sons - Bipin and Vijay. Both sons joined the Army. Bipin rose to the rank of General, becoming the 26th Chief of the Army Staff and the first Chief of the Defence Staff. He was killed in harness in a helicopter crash in 2021. Vijay retired in the rank of Colonel.

Military offices
Preceded by Mathew Thomas	General Officer Commanding X Corps; 1985-1986	Succeeded by F. N. Billimoria
Preceded by Kunwar Mahendra Singh	Deputy Chief of the Army Staff; 1987-1988	Succeeded by R. N. Mahajan
