= Bipin Rawat =

1st Chief of Defence Staff of India (1958–2021)

General Bipin Rawat PVSM UYSM AVSM YSM SM VSM ADC
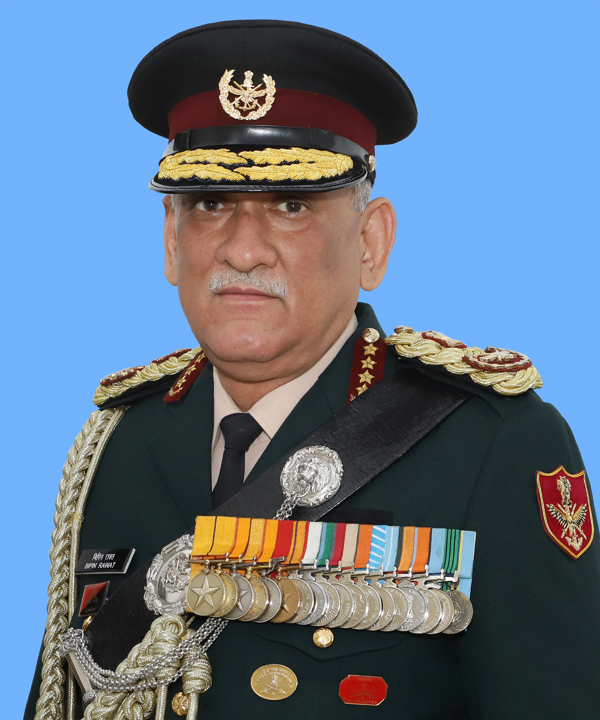
- Official portrait, 2020

1st Chief of Defence Staff
- In office 1 January 2020 – 8 December 2021
- President: Ram Nath Kovind
- Prime Minister: Narendra Modi
- Preceded by: Office established
- Succeeded by: Anil Chauhan (2022)

57th Chairman of the Chiefs of Staff Committee
- In office 27 September 2019 – 8 December 2021 (27 September 2019–31 December 2019 as COAS) (1 January 2020 – 8 December 2021 as CDS)
- President: Ram Nath Kovind
- Prime Minister: Narendra Modi
- Preceded by: Birender Singh Dhanoa
- Succeeded by: Manoj Mukund Naravane (acting); Anil Chauhan

27th Chief of the Army Staff
- In office 31 December 2016 – 31 December 2019
- President: Pranab Mukherjee; Ram Nath Kovind
- Prime Minister: Narendra Modi
- Preceded by: Dalbir Singh Suhag
- Succeeded by: Manoj Mukund Naravane

37th Vice Chief of the Army Staff
- In office 1 September 2016 – 31 December 2016
- President: Pranab Mukherjee
- Prime Minister: Narendra Modi
- Minister of Defence: Manohar Parrikar
- Preceded by: Man Mohan Singh Rai
- Succeeded by: Sarath Chand

Personal details
- Born: 16 March 1958 Saina, Pauri Garhwal district, Uttar Pradesh (now Uttarakhand), India
- Died: 8 December 2021 (aged 63) Bandishola, Nilgiris district, Tamil Nadu, India
- Cause of death: Helicopter crash
- Spouse: Madhulika Singh (m. 1985; died 2021)
- Children: 2
- Parent: Lieutenant General Lakshman Singh Rawat (father)
- Education: National Defence Academy (BSc); Indian Military Academy; Defence Services Staff College; University of Madras (MPhil); U.S. Army Command and General Staff College

Military service
- Allegiance: India
- Branch/service: Indian Army
- Years of service: 16 December 1978 – 8 December 2021
- Rank: General
- Unit: 5/11 Gorkha Rifles
- Commands: Southern Command; III Corps; 19th Infantry Division; North Kivu Brigade; 5 Sector RR; 5/11 Gorkha Rifles
- Service number: IC-35471M
- Awards: Padma Vibhushan (posthumous); Param Vishisht Seva Medal; Uttam Yudh Seva Medal; Ati Vishisht Seva Medal; Yudh Seva Medal; Sena Medal; Vishisht Seva Medal

General Bipin Rawat PVSM UYSM AVSM YSM SM VSM ADC (16 March 1958 – 8 December 2021) was an Indian Army general who served as the first Chief of Defence Staff (CDS) of the Indian Armed Forces from January 2020 until his death in a helicopter crash in December 2021. Prior to taking over as the CDS, he served as the 57th Chairman of the Chiefs of Staff Committee (Chairman COSC) of the Indian Armed Forces as well as 27th Chief of the Army Staff (COAS) of the Indian Army.

Born in Pauri, Pauri Garhwal district in present-day Uttarakhand to Lieutenant General Lakshman Singh Rawat, he graduated from the National Defence Academy and the Indian Military Academy where he was awarded the Sword of Honour. He was commissioned into his father's unit - 11 Gorkha Rifles. He served during the 1987 Sino-Indian skirmish in the Sumdorong Chu valley. He commanded a company in Uri and his battalion - 5/11 GR along the Line of Actual Control in Arunachal Pradesh. Promoted to the rank of Brigadier, he commanded 5 sector Rashtriya Rifles in Sopore. He subsequently served with the United Nations as the Commander of a Multinational Brigade as part of MONUSCO.

Promoted to general officer, Rawat commanded the 19 Infantry Division at Uri. He then served as the Major General General Staff (MGGS) at Headquarters Eastern Command. In 2014, he was promoted to the rank of Lieutenant General and appointed General officer commanding (GOC) III Corps at Dimapur. During this tenure, the 2015 Indian counter-insurgency operation in Myanmar took place where units under his command executed cross-border strikes against the NSCN-K. In early 2016, Rawat was promoted to Army Commander grade and appointed General Officer Commanding-in-Chief Southern Command. After a short stint, he moved to Army HQ as the Vice Chief of the Army Staff. In December that year, he was appointed the next Chief of the Army Staff superseding two senior generals. As the senior-most chief of staff amongst the three services, he served as the Chairman of the Chiefs of Staff Committee of the Indian Armed Forces from September 2019 to December 2021. He was appointed as the first Chief of Defence Staff (CDS) of the Indian Armed Forces in January 2020 and served until his death in December 2021.

During Rawat's tenure as the COAS, in 2017, a 73-day military border standoff happened at Doklam between the Indian Armed Forces and the People's Liberation Army.

== Early life and career ==
Bipin Rawat was born in Pauri town of Pauri Garhwal district, present-day Uttarakhand state, on 16 March 1958 to a Hindu Garhwali Rajput family. His family had been serving in the Indian Army for multiple generations.

Rawat's father, Lakshman Singh Rawat (1930–2015), was from Sainj village of the Pauri Garhwal district; commissioned into 3/11 Gorkha Rifles in 1951, he retired as Deputy Chief of the Army Staff in 1988 in the rank of Lieutenant General. His mother was from the Uttarkashi district and was the daughter of Kishan Singh Parmar, the ex-Member of the Legislative Assembly (MLA) from Uttarkashi.

Rawat was educated at Cambrian Hall School in Dehradun, and at St. Edward's School, Shimla. He then joined the National Defence Academy, Khadakwasla, and the Indian Military Academy, Dehradun, from where he graduated first in the order of merit and was awarded the 'Sword of Honour.'

Rawat was also a graduate of the Defence Services Staff College (DSSC), Wellington, and the Higher Command Course at the United States Army Command and General Staff College (USACGSC) at Fort Leavenworth, Kansas, in 1997. From his tenure at the DSSC, he obtained an MPhil degree in Defence Studies as well as diplomas in Management and Computer Studies from the University of Madras. In 2011, he was awarded an honorary doctorate by Chaudhary Charan Singh University, Meerut, for his research on military-media strategic studies.

== Military career ==
=== Early career ===
Rawat was commissioned into the 5th battalion, the 11 Gorkha Rifles (5/11 GR) on 16 December 1978, the same unit as his father. During the 1987 Sino-Indian skirmish in the Sumdorong Chu valley, then Captain Rawat's battalion was deployed against the Chinese People's Liberation Army. The standoff was the first military confrontation along the disputed McMahon Line after the 1962 war.

Early in his career, Rawat had an instructional tenure at the Indian Military Academy, Dehradun. He had much experience in high-altitude warfare and spent ten years conducting counter-insurgency operations. He commanded a company in Uri, Jammu and Kashmir as a Major. He attended the Defence Services Staff College, Wellington. After the course, he was appointed General Staff Officer, Grade 2 (GSO2) at the Military Operations Directorate at Army headquarters. He also served as a logistics staff officer of a Re-organised Army Plains Infantry Division (RAPID) in Central India. He attended the Higher Command Course at the United States Army Command and General Staff College (USACGSC) at Fort Leavenworth, Kansas.

As a colonel, Rawat commanded his battalion, the 5th battalion, the 11 Gorkha Rifles, in the eastern sector along the Line of Actual Control at Kibithu. For his command of 5/11 GR, he was awarded the Vishisht Seva Medal on 26 January 2001. He also served as Colonel Military Secretary (Col MS) and Deputy Military Secretary in the Military Secretary's Branch and as a Senior Instructor in the Junior Command Wing.

On 26 January 2005, he was awarded the Sena Medal for devotion to duty. Promoted to the rank of Brigadier, he commanded 5 Sector Rashtriya Rifles in Sopore. He was awarded the Yudh Seva Medal for his command of 5 Sector RR.

=== UN mission in Congo ===
Rawat commanded MONUSCO (a Multinational Brigade in a Chapter VII mission in the Democratic Republic of the Congo). Within two weeks of deployment in the DRC, the Brigade faced a major offensive in the east which threatened the regional capital of North Kivu, Goma. The offensive also threatened to destabilise the country as a whole. The situation demanded a rapid response and North Kivu Brigade was reinforced, where it was responsible for over 7,000 men and women, representing nearly half of the total MONUSCO force. Whilst simultaneously engaged in offensive kinetic operations against the CNDP and other armed groups, Rawat (then Brigadier) carried out tactical support to the Congolese Army (FARDC), He sensitised programmes with the local population and detailed coordination to ensure that all were informed about the situation and worked together in the progress of operations. He was responsible for the protection of the vulnerable population.

This operational period lasted for four months. Goma never fell, the East stabilized and the main armed group was motivated to the negotiating table and has since been integrated into the FARDC. He was also tasked to present the Revised Charter of Peace Enforcement to the Special Representatives of the Secretary-General and Force Commanders of all the UN missions in a special conference at Wilton Park, London, on 16 May 2009. Rawat was twice awarded the Force Commander's Commendation.

=== General officer ===
After promotion to Major General, Rawat took over as the General Officer Commanding 19th Infantry Division (Uri). For his command of the Dagger Division, as the 19th Infantry Division is called, he was awarded the Ati Vishisht Seva Medal on 26 January 2013. He subsequently served as the Major General General Staff (MGGS) of the Eastern Command.

=== 2015 Myanmar strikes ===
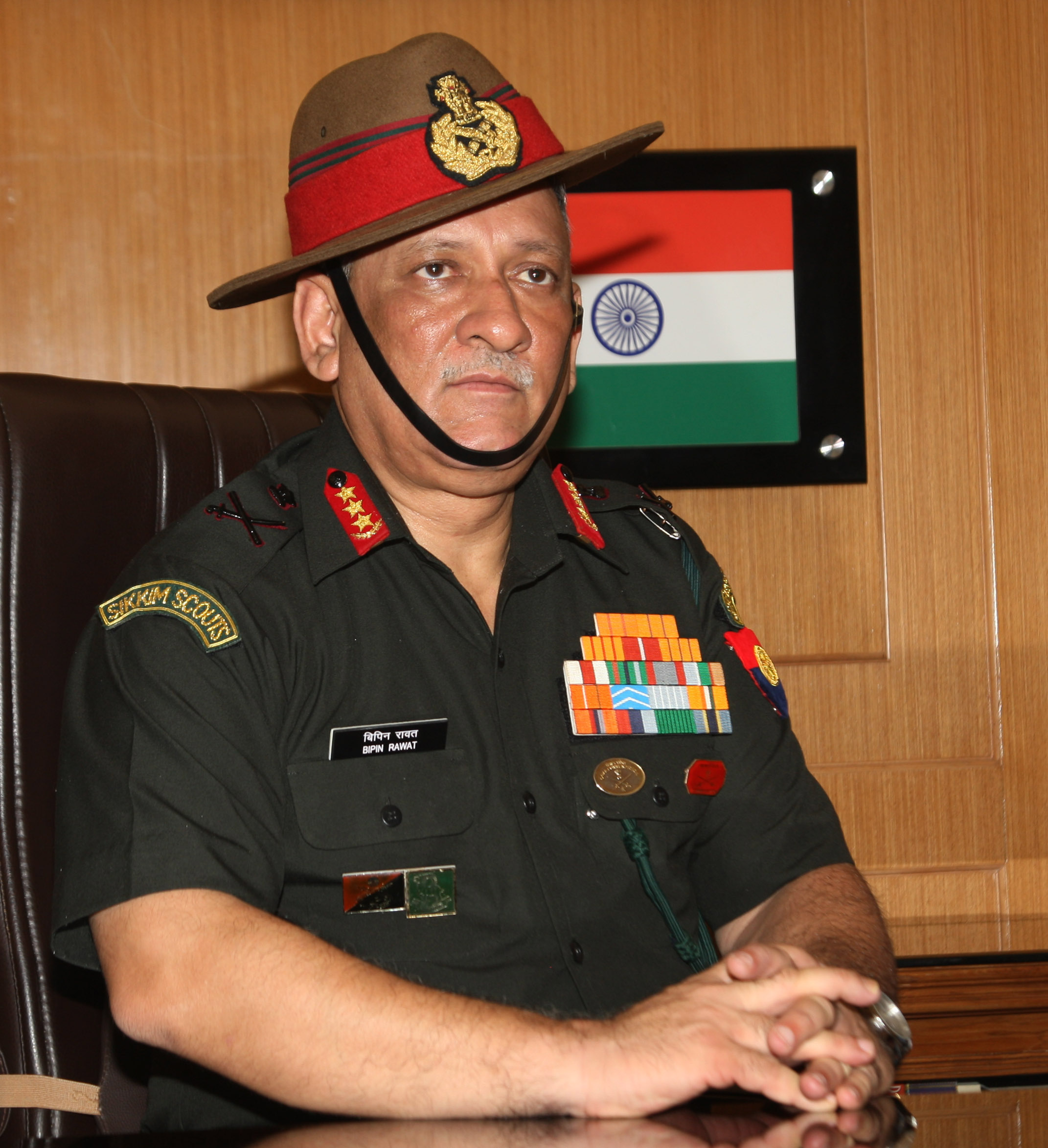
Rawat as the VCOAS.

Promoted to the rank of Lieutenant General, he was appointed General Officer Commanding III Corps, headquartered in Dimapur. In June 2015, eighteen Indian soldiers were killed in an ambush by militants belonging to the United Liberation Front of Western South East Asia (UNLFW) in Manipur. The Indian Army responded with cross-border strikes in which units of the 21st battalion of the Parachute Regiment struck an NSCN-K base in Myanmar. 21 Para was under the operational control of the Dimapur based III Corps, which was then commanded by Rawat. For his command of III Corps, he was awarded the Uttam Yudh Seva Medal on 26 January 2016.

=== Army Commander ===
After relinquishing command of III Corps, Rawat was appointed General Officer Commanding Maharashtra, Gujarat and Goa Area, headquartered in Mumbai. After a short stint, he was promoted to the Army Commander grade and assumed the post of General Officer Commanding-in-Chief (GOC-in-C) Southern Command on 1 January 2016. After an eight-month tenure, he assumed the post of Vice Chief of the Army Staff on 1 September 2016.

=== Chief of the Army Staff ===
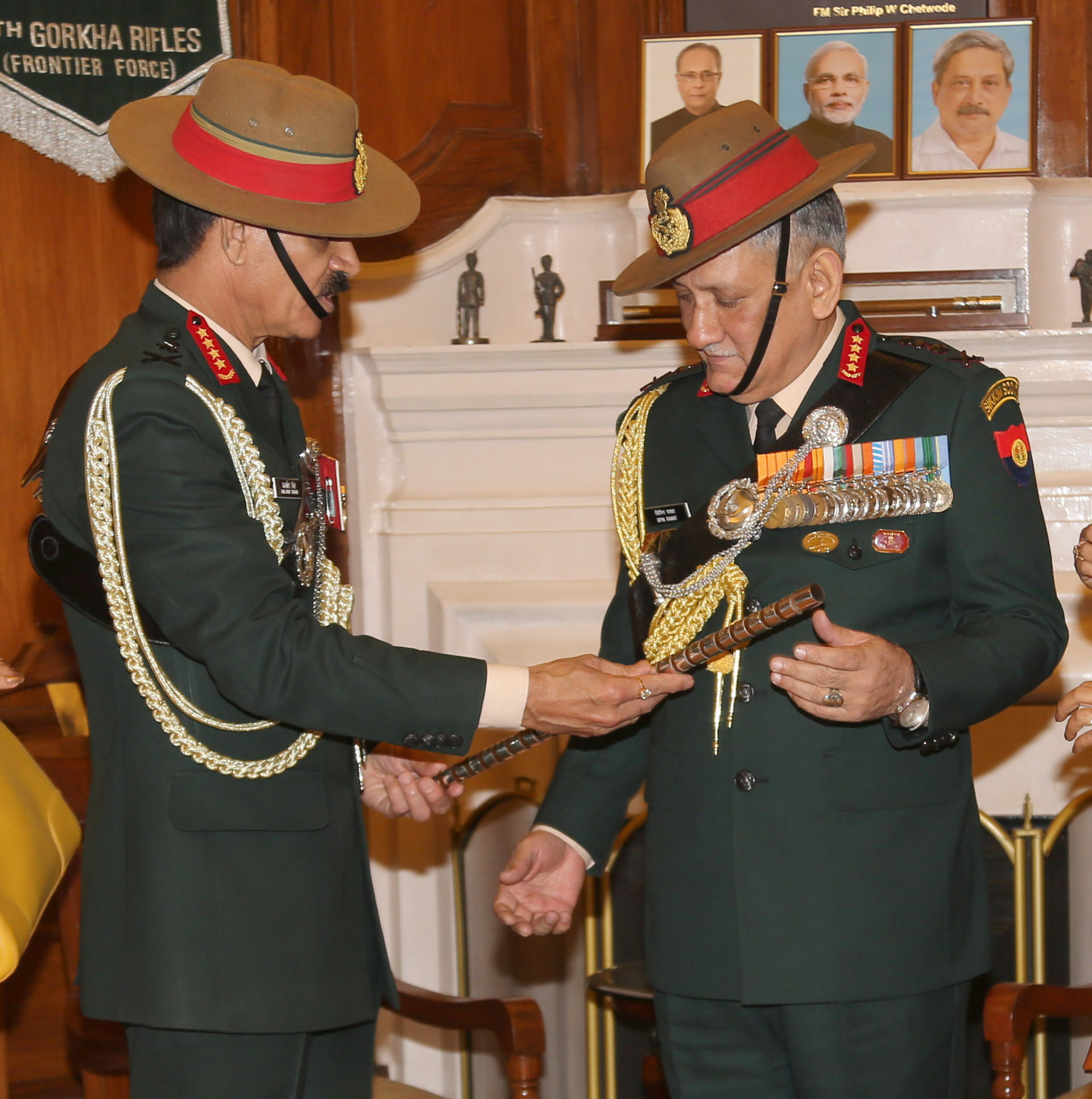
General Dalbir Singh Suhag handing over the baton to Rawat at Army HQ

On 17 December 2016, the Government of India appointed Rawat as the 27th Chief of the Army Staff, superseding two more senior Lieutenant Generals, Praveen Bakshi (Eastern Army Commander) and P. M. Hariz (Southern Army Commander). The appointment made by NDA ruled Government was politically controversial. Rawat was accused of nepotism and gratuitously politicising the appointment, by the senior serving and retired military officers.

He took office of Chief of the Army Staff as the 27th COAS on 31 December 2016, after retirement of General Dalbir Singh Suhag. He was the third officer from the Gorkha Brigade to become the Chief of the Army Staff, after Sam Manekshaw and Suhag.

He rejected the implementation of Non-Functional Upgradation (NFU) for the armed forces. Speaking in May 2017, he urged defence personnel not to compare themselves with civil-service officers and clarified that the military would “implement NFU in our own way,” emphasizing that automatic pay upgrades of the kind granted to Group A civil servants could potentially diminish the distinct status of the armed services.

In 2018, Rawat defended the army Major involved in the Kashmir human shield incident, where a Kashmiri man was tied to a jeep as a human shield. The officer was awarded a Chief of the Army Staff Commendation Card by Rawat for counter-insurgency operations.

Rawat had been criticized by the opposition party leaders for making political statements during the Citizenship Amendment Act protests.

On his visit to the United States in 2019, General Rawat was inducted to the United States Army Command and General Staff College International Hall of Fame. He was also an honorary General of Nepalese Army in accordance with the tradition between the Indian and Nepali armies to confer the honorary rank of General upon each other's chiefs to signify their close and special military ties.

Rawat served as the 57th Chairman of the Chiefs of Staff Committee.

==== Doklam standoff with Chinese army ====
In 2017, at Doklam a 73-day military border standoff happened between the Indian Armed Forces and the People's Liberation Army of China over Chinese construction of a road in Doklam near a trijunction border area between Bhutan, China and India. After the standoff ended Rawat said China had begun 'flexing its muscles' and was trying to 'nibble away' territory held by India in a gradual manner to test the limits of thresholds. He stated, India had to be "wary about" China, "and remain prepared for situations that could develop into conflicts".

==== On Pakistan ====
Rawat said that India did not "see any scope for reconciliation with Pakistan as its military, polity and people have decided that India wants to break their country into pieces". Rawat suspected Pakistan could "swing into action to take advantage of India's preoccupation with China". Rawat thus highlighted a two-front war situation without offering a solution or remedy.

==== Two front War ====
Until 2019, Rawat had given statements warning India to be prepared for a simultaneous war on two fronts against China and Pakistan. In September 2017, during a seminar in Delhi, Rawat said that "warfare lies within the realm of reality" along India borders with China and Pakistan, even though all the three countries have nuclear arms. According to critics, Rawat neither prepared for such an outcome nor initiated measures to thwart it.

==== Bilateral visits as Chief of the Army Staff ====
Country	Date	Purpose	Ref
2017
Nepal	28–31 March	Bilateral discussions with President, Prime Minister and Defence Minister.; Visited a high-altitude military warfare training centre at Pokhara and Muktinath.	
Bangladesh	31 March – 2 April	Bilateral discussions with President, Prime Minister and Chief of Army Staff.; Visited headquarters of an infantry division and armoured corps at Bogra.	
Bhutan	27–30 April	Audience with King of Bhutan.; Goodwill visit.	
Myanmar	28–31 May	Bilateral discussions with State Counseller, Union Minister for Foreign Affairs, Commander-in-Chief of Defence Services, Deputy Commander-in-Chief of Defence Services and Commander-in-Chief of Army.; Visited National Defence College, Nay Pyi Taw and Defence Services Academy, Pwin Oo Lwin.	
Kazakhstan	1–3 August	Bilateral discussions with Defence Minister, Chairman of the National Security Committee, Vice Minister of Defence and Commander-in-Chief of Land Forces of Kazakhstan.; Visited elite Air Assault Brigade and National Defence University in Astana	
Turkmenistan	4–5 August	Bilateral discussions with Minister of Defence & Secretary, National Security Council, First Deputy Minister & Chief of General Staff, Commanders of Land, Naval, Air & Air Defence Forces; Visited the Military Institute & Military Academy	
2018
Nepal	12–14 February	Bilateral meetings with President and Prime Minister; Chief guest at Army day of the Nepalese Army	
Sri Lanka	14–17 May	Bilateral meetings with President, Prime Minister and Chiefs of Sri Lankan Armed Forces; Visited the Sri Lanka Military Academy, Diyatalawa and military establishments at Kandy and Trincomalee	
Russia	1–6 October	Bilateral meetings with senior military officers; Visited the Mikhailovskaya Artillery Academy, Western Military District HQ (St Petersburg) and HQ and General Staff Academy at Moscow	
Vietnam	22–25 November	Bilateral meetings with Defence Minister, Deputy Chief of the General Staff and other senior military personnel; Visited the HQ of an infantry division near Hanoi and 7 Military Region HQ at Ho Chi Minh City	
Tanzania; Kenya	17–20 December	Met senior civil and military leaders of the two countries	
2019
United States	2–5 April	Bilateral meetings with Chief of Staff of the United States Army General Mark A. Milley and General Joseph Dunford, Chairman of the Joint Chiefs of Staff; Visited the United States Military Academy at West Point and the United States Army Command and General Staff College at Fort Leavenworth	
Maldives	30 September – 3 October 2019	Interacted with the hierarchy of the Maldivian government and armed forces.; visit aimed at strengthening close bilateral defence ties between the two nations.; Army Chief meet President of Maldives, minister of defence, foreign minister and chief of National Defence Forces.; Military vehicles and military equipment exchanged	

=== Chief of Defence Staff ===
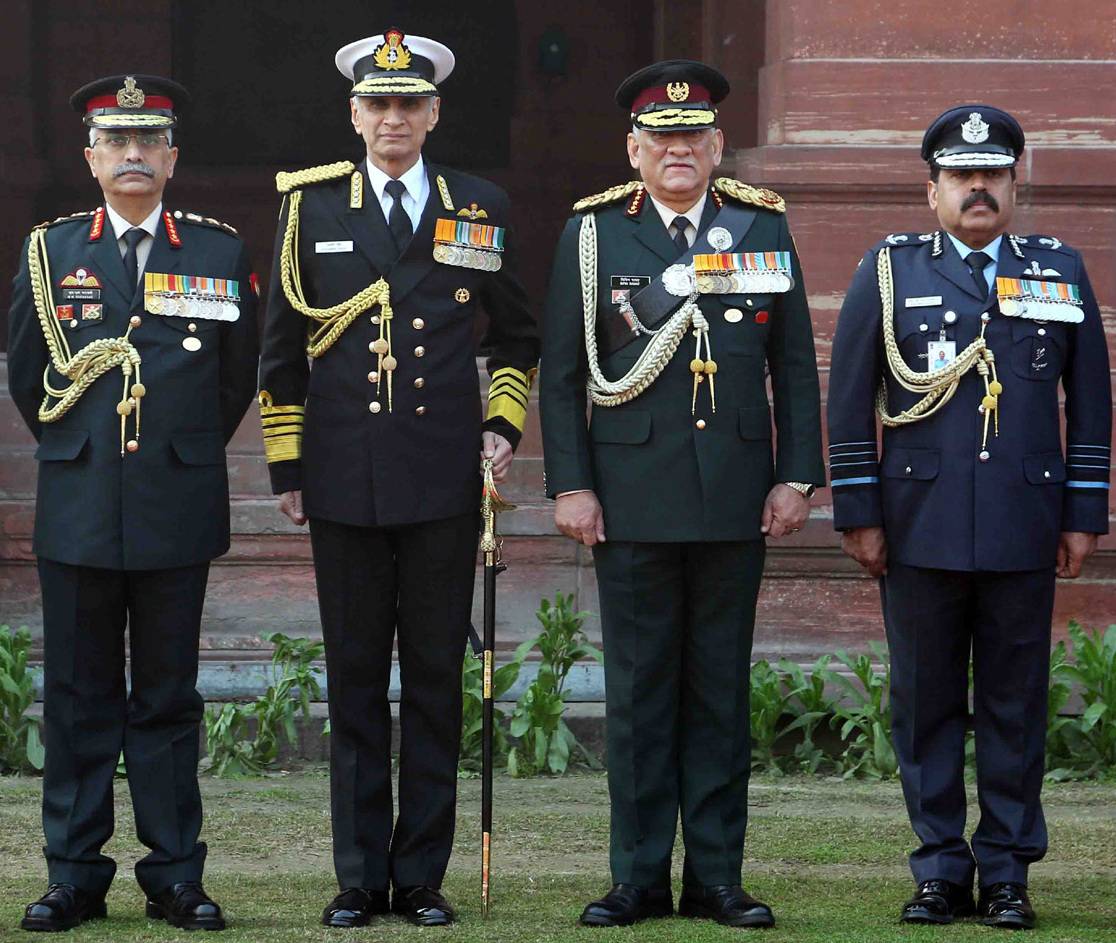
CDS General Bipin Rawat with COAS General Manoj Mukund Naravane, CNS Admiral Karambir Singh and CAS Air Chief Marshal R. K. S. Bhadauria after the ceremonial Guard of Honour, in New Delhi on 1 January 2020

He served as the first Chief of Defence Staff (CDS) of the Indian Armed Forces from January 2020 until his death in December 2021.

India as of 2021 had service–specific commands system. joint and integrated commands, also known as unified commands; and further divided into theatre or functional commands, have been set up and more are proposed. In February 2020, Rawat said two to five theatre commands may be set up. The completion of the creation of theatre commands, both integrated and joint commands, will take a number of years. Indian Air Force opposed the formation of unified theatre commands citing limitation of resources.

==== Comments on supremacy of Army ====
On May 6, 2017, during his visit to attend a disabled soldiers’ rally organized by the Delhi-based War Wounded Foundation at the Armed Forces Medical College, General Bipin Rawat stated that the status of Armed Forces personnel is ‘higher’ than that of civil services. He emphasized that defence personnel should not seek non-functional upgradation (NFU) similar to that granted to Group ‘A’ civil service officers, warning that such a move could result in a downgrade of their status.

On a separate occasion, Rawat put emphasis on the 'supremacy and primacy' of the Indian Army over the Air force and Navy, in fighting wars. Rawat had stated, "Wars will be fought on land, and therefore the primacy of the army must be maintained over the air force and navy. The statement had antagonised the Air Force and Navy.

In early 2021, Rawat called the Indian Air Force a "supporting arm" of India's defence network and infrastructure. Air Chief Marshal R. K. S. Bhadauria made a public statement in response that the IAF served a bigger role than a supporting arm.

==== Comments on China ====
On 15 September 2021 while speaking at an event in the capacity of the CDS at the India International Centre in New Delhi, General Rawat touched upon the theory of clash of civilisations with regards to the western civilisation and China's growing relations with countries like Iran and Turkey. The next day, on 16 September 2021, India's Minister of External Affairs S. Jaishankar conveyed to his Chinese counterpart that India does not subscribe to any clash of civilisations theory.

== Personal life ==
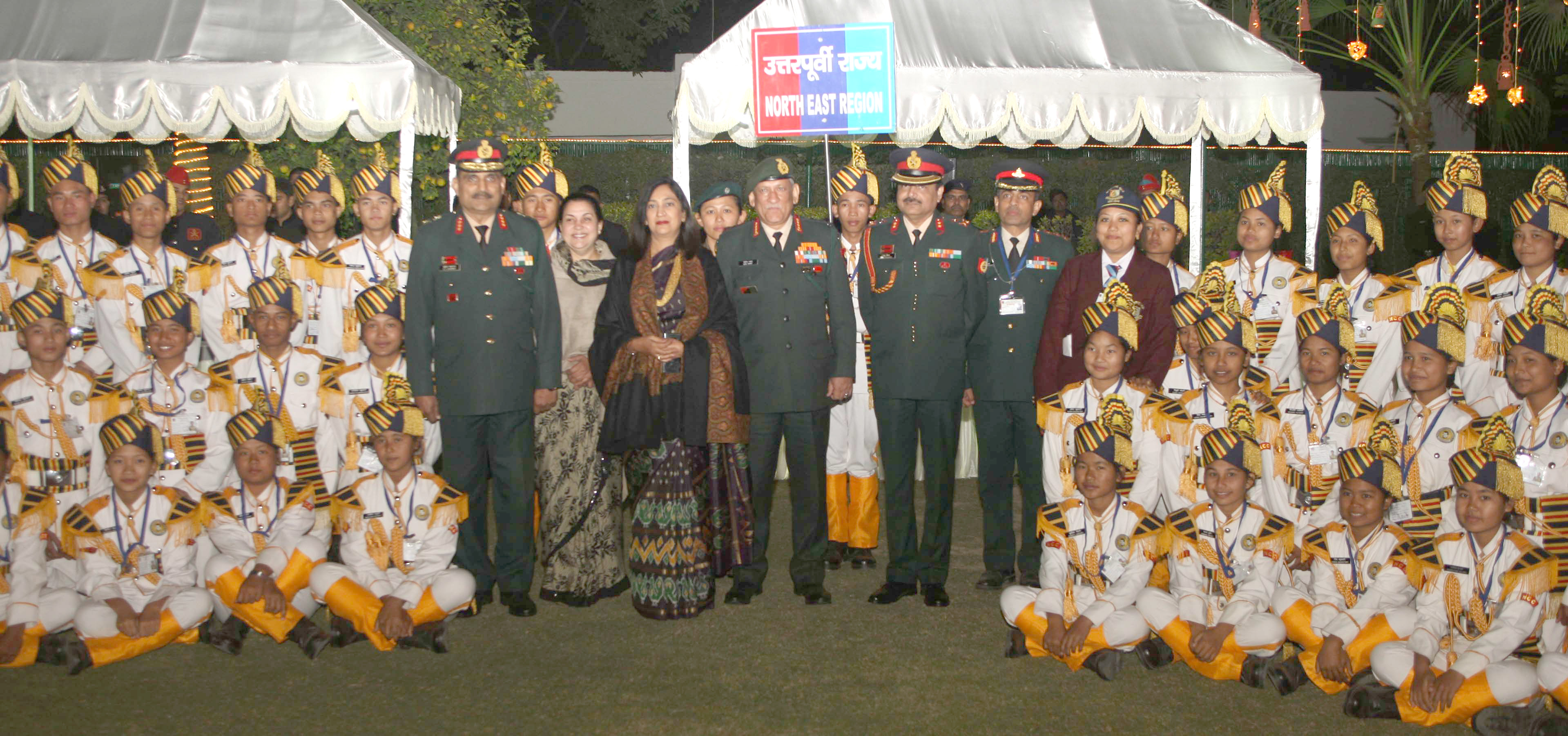
Madhulika Rawat and then COAS Bipin Rawat at the NCC Reception, in New Delhi on 16 January 2018.

In 1985, Rawat married Madhulika Rawat (née Raje Singh). A descendant of an erstwhile princely Baghel family, she was the daughter of Kunwar Mrigendra Singh, sometime Riyasatdar of the pargana of Sohagpur (Rewa Riyasat) now in Shahdol district and an Indian National Congress MLA from the district in 1967 and 1972. She was educated at Scindia Kanya Vidyalaya in Gwalior and graduated in psychology at University of Delhi. The couple had two daughters, Kritika and Tarini.

Madhulika Rawat was the president of the Army Wives Welfare Association (AWWA) during Bipin Rawat's tenure as Chief of the Army Staff. She became the president of the Defence Wives Welfare Association (DWWA), upon the creation of the post and the appointment of General Bipin Rawat as the first CDS. She worked to make the wives of defence personnel financially independent. She was also involved with NGOs and welfare associations such as Veer Naris that assists widows of military personnel, disabled children and cancer patients.

== Death and legacy ==
On 8 December 2021, Rawat, his wife and members of his staff were amongst 10 passengers and 4 crew members aboard an Indian Air Force Mil Mi-17 helicopter flight en route from the Sulur Air Force Base to the Defence Services Staff College (DSSC), Wellington, where Rawat was to deliver a lecture. At around 12:10 p.m. local time, the aircraft crashed near a residential colony of private tea estate employees on the outskirts of the hamlet of Nanjappachatiram, Bandishola panchayat, in the Katteri-Nanchappanchathram area of Coonoor taluk, Nilgiris district. The crash site was 10 kilometres (6.2 mi; 5.4 nmi) from the flight's intended destination. Rawat's death – and those of his wife and 11 others – was later confirmed by the Indian Air Force. Rawat's liaison officer, Group Captain Varun Singh initially survived the incident, but later succumbed to injuries on 15 December. Rawat was 63 at the time of his death.

Rawat and his wife were cremated according to Hindu rituals with full military honours and 17 gun salute at Brar Square Crematorium in Delhi Cantonment on 10 December 2021. Their cremation was carried out by their daughters, who took their ashes to Haridwar and immersed them in the Ganges at the Har Ki Pauri ghat on 12 December.

Foreign military commanders from a number of neighbouring countries attended the state funeral. They were:

Country	Dignitaries
Bhutan	Brig Dorji Rinchen (Deputy Chief Operations Officer) Royal Bhutan Army
Bangladesh	Lt Gen Waker-UZ-Zaman (Principal Staff Officer) Armed Forces Division
Nepal	Suprobal Janasewashree Lt Gen Bal Krishna Karki (Chief of General Staff) Nepali Army
Sri Lanka	Gen Shavendra Silva (Chief of Defence Staff and Commander of the Sri Lanka Army) Admiral Ravindra Chandrasiri Wijegunaratne (Retd) (Former Chief of Defence Staff)

In December 2024, a Standing Committee on defense report tabled in Lok Sabha stated that the Mi-17 crash, which took place on December 8, 2021, occurred because of "Human Error (Aircrew)".

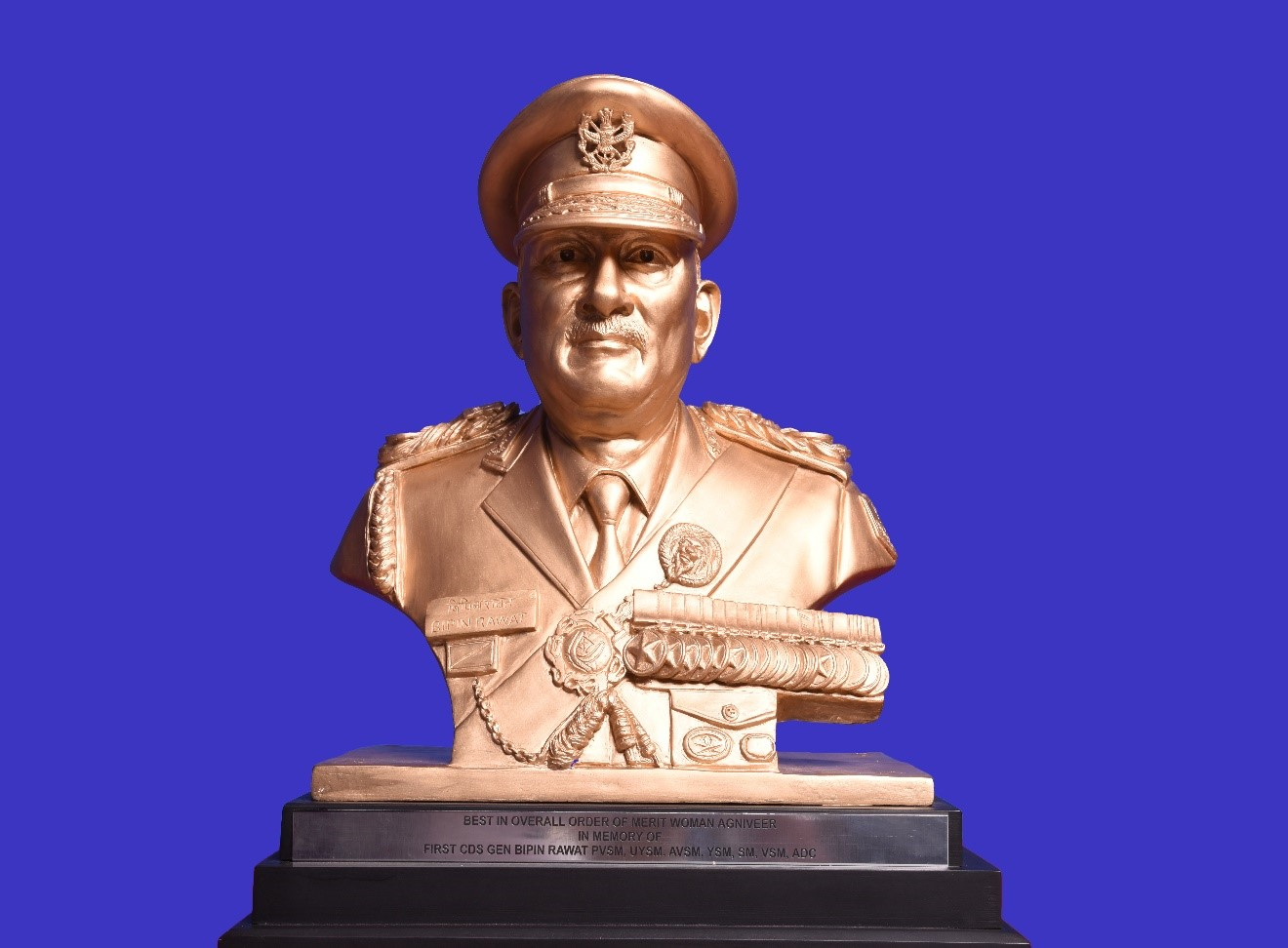
The General Bipin Rawat trophy presented to the Woman Naval Agniveer Trainee standing First in Overall Order of Merit.

On Rawat's first death anniversary, his bust was unveiled at the United Service Institution of India (USI) by the Minister of State for Defence Ajay Bhatt. A chair of excellence and a memorial lecture was instituted at the institute by the Indian Armed Forces and the USI. The General Bipin Rawat Block at the Military Engineer Services Inspection Bungalow (MES IB) in Colaba, Mumbai is named for Rawat. The General Rawat India-Australia Young Defence Officers' Exchange Programme established in March 2022 is named for Rawat. The programme is aimed at enhancing professional military contacts between the two armed forces and facilitate the exchange of ideas and operational experiences.

On Rawat's 65th birth anniversary, the Indian Navy instituted the General Bipin Rawat rolling trophy for the Woman Agniveer Trainee standing First in Overall Order of Merit. The trophy was instituted to honour his contribution to transformational Agnipath Scheme and is presented at the sailors training centre INS Chilka. The Navy also instituted the General Bipin Rawat Rolling trophy for the Most Spirited Officer undergoing the Naval Higher Command Course (NHCC) at the Naval War College, Goa. In December 2013, the Jhelum Stadium in Janbazpora, Baramulla was renamed General Bipin Rawat stadium. Rawat had served as the GOC 19 Infantry Division, headquartered at Baramulla.

== Honours and decorations ==
During his career of nearly 43 years, he was awarded multiple times for gallantry and distinguished service. He was awarded the Vishisht Seva Medal in 2001, the Sena Medal in 2005, the Yudh Seva Medal in 2009, the Ati Vishisht Seva Medal in 2013, the Uttam Yudh Seva Medal in 2016 and the Param Vishisht Seva Medal in 2019. He was also awarded the COAS Commendation on two occasions and the Army Commander's Commendation. While serving with the United Nations, he was awarded the Force Commander's Commendation twice. He was posthumously honored with the Padma Vibhushan in 2022.

Padma Vibhushan (posthumous)	Param Vishisht Seva Medal		Uttam Yudh Seva Medal
Ati Vishisht Seva Medal	Yudh Seva Medal	Sena Medal	Vishisht Seva Medal
Wound Medal	Samanya Seva Medal	Special Service Medal	Operation Parakram Medal
Sainya Seva Medal	High Altitude Medal	Videsh Seva Medal	50th Independence Anniversary Medal
30 Years Long Service Medal	20 Years Long Service Medal	9 Years Long Service Medal	MONUSCO

== Dates of rank ==
Insignia	Rank	Component	Date of rank
	Second Lieutenant	Indian Army	16 December 1978
	Lieutenant	Indian Army	16 December 1980
	Captain	Indian Army	31 July 1984
	Major	Indian Army	16 December 1989
	Lieutenant Colonel	Indian Army	1 June 1998
	Colonel	Indian Army	1 August 2003
	Brigadier	Indian Army	1 October 2007 (seniority from 17 May 2007)
	Major General	Indian Army	20 October 2011 (substantive, seniority from 11 May 2010)
	Lieutenant General	Indian Army	1 June 2014 (substantive)
	General (COAS)	Indian Army	1 January 2017
	General (CDS)	Indian Armed Forces (tri-service)	31 December 2019

Military offices
Preceded by S. L. Narasimhan	General Officer Commanding III Corps; 1 September 2014 – 23 November 2015	Succeeded by Abhay Krishna
Preceded by Ashok Singh	General Officer Commanding-in-Chief Southern Command; 1 January 2016 – 31 July 2016	Succeeded by Pattiarimal Mohamadali Hariz
Preceded by Man Mohan Singh Rai	Vice Chief of the Army Staff; 1 September 2016 – 31 December 2016	Succeeded by Sarath Chand
Preceded by Dalbir Singh Suhag	Chief of the Army Staff; 31 December 2016 – 31 December 2019	Succeeded by Manoj Mukund Naravane
Preceded by Birender Singh Dhanoa	Chairman of the Chiefs of Staff Committee; 27 September 2019 – 31 December 2019 (as COAS); 1 January 2020 – 8 December 2021 (as CDS)	Succeeded by Manoj Mukund Naravane
Preceded by Office established	Chief of Defence Staff; 1 January 2020 – 8 December 2021	Succeeded by Anil Chauhan
