= Devendra Sharma (general) =

Lieutenant General in the Indian Army

Lieutenant General Devendra Sharma PVSM AVSM SM
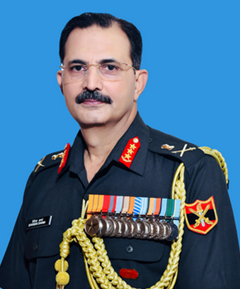

General Officer Commanding-in-Chief Army Training Command
- In office 1 July 2024 – 31 August 2026
- Chief of Army Staff: Upendra Dwivedi; Dhiraj Seth
- Preceded by: Manjinder Singh
- Succeeded by: Shrinjay Pratap Singh

Personal details
- Education: Mayo College; National Defence Academy; Indian Military Academy

Military service
- Allegiance: India
- Branch/service: Indian Army
- Years of service: 19 December 1987 – 31 August 2026
- Rank: Lieutenant General
- Unit: 14th Horse (Scinde Horse)
- Commands: Army Training Command; XI Corps; 14th Horse (Scinde Horse)
- Service number: IC-47003Y
- Awards: Param Vishisht Seva Medal; Ati Vishisht Seva Medal; Sena Medal

Lieutenant General Devendra Sharma, PVSM, AVSM, SM is a retired general officer of the Indian Army. He last served as the General Officer Commanding-in-Chief Army Training Command. He previously served as the Chief of Staff, Western Command. He earlier served as General Officer Commanding Vajra Corps (XI Corps), prior to that he served as Chief of Staff, Western Command.

== Early life and education ==
The general officer is an alumnus of Mayo College, Ajmer. He then attended the National Defence Academy, Khadakwasla and the Indian Military Academy, Dehradun. In Indian Military Academy, he was awarded the Sword of Honour for standing first in overall merit. He is also an alumnus of Defence Services Staff College, Wellington, College of Defence Management, Secunderabad and Indian Institute of Public Administration, New Delhi. While doing Higher Defence Management Course at CDM, he was awarded the Chief of Army Staff Trophy for standing First in overall order of merit.

== Military career ==
He was commissioned into the 14th Horse (Scinde Horse) on 19 December 1987 from the Indian Military Academy. In a career spanning over three decades, he has undertaken command appointments in sensitive operational sectors, counter-terrorism environment, and high-altitude terrain. He has commanded the Scinde Horse, an armoured brigade as part of the strike corps, an infantry division and a corps on the western front. His staff experience includes challenging assignments both in operational and administrative domains, he has been an instructor at the National Defence Academy, a Staff Officer Operations in the Indian Military Training Team, Bhutan and the Chief Military Personnel Officer of the United Nations Mission in Democratic Republic of the Congo (MONUSCO). He has a rich experience of both conventional and counter insurgency operations. As a young officer, he served with an Infantry Battalion in OPERATION RAKSHAK (J&K) where he was awarded the Sena Medal for Gallantry.

After being promoted to the rank of Lieutenant general, he assumed the appointment of Chief of Staff, Western Command on 18 October 2021. On 11 February 2022, he took over as the General Officer Commanding Vajra Corps (XI Corps) from Lieutenant general C Bansi Ponnappa. A year later on 16 May 2023 he assumed appointment as the Chief of Staff, Western Command.

On 1 July 2024, he took over as the General Officer Commanding-in-Chief Army Training Command succeeding Lieutenant general Manjinder Singh who moved to South Western Command as Army Commander. He superannuated on 31 August 2026.

== Awards and decorations ==
The General officer has been awarded with the Param Vishisht Seva Medal in 2025, the Ati Vishisht Seva Medal in 2022 and Sena Medal for gallantry. He has also been awarded with Central Army Commander's Commendation card and UN Force Commander's Appreciation.

| Param Vishisht Seva Medal | Ati Vishisht Seva Medal | | Sena Medal |
| Special Service Medal | Operation Vijay Medal | Operation Parakram Medal | Sainya Seva Medal |
| High Altitude Medal | Videsh Seva Medal | 75th Independence Anniversary Medal | 50th Independence Anniversary Medal |
| 30 Years Long Service Medal | 20 Years Long Service Medal | 9 Years Long Service Medal | MONUSCO |

== Dates of rank ==
| Insignia | Rank | Component | Date of rank |
|---|---|---|---|
| | Second Lieutenant | Indian Army | 19 December 1987 |
| | Lieutenant | Indian Army | 19 December 1989 |
| | Captain | Indian Army | 19 December 1992 |
| | Major | Indian Army | 19 December 1998 |
| | Lieutenant Colonel | Indian Army | 16 December 2004 |
| | Colonel | Indian Army | 1 January 2008 |
| | Brigadier | Indian Army | 1 June 2014 (acting) 1 November 2014 (substantive, with seniority from 27 January 2012) |
| | Major General | Indian Army | 1 September 2019 (seniority from 1 January 2018) |
| | Lieutenant General | Indian Army | 27 September 2021 |

Military offices
| Preceded by Manjinder Singh | General Officer Commanding-in-Chief Army Training Command; 1 July 2024 - Present | Succeeded by Shrinjay Pratap Singh |
| Preceded by Vijay B Nair | Chief of Staff, Western Command; 16 May 2023 - 30 June 2024 | Succeeded by Mohit Wadhwa |
| Preceded by Bansi Ponnappa | General Officer Commanding XI Corps; 11 February 2022 – 15 May 2023 | Succeeded by Vijay B Nair |
| Preceded by Manjinder Singh | Chief of Staff, Western Command; 18 October 2021 - 10 February 2022 | Succeeded by Vijay B Nair |
