= Leetul Gogoi =

Indian Army officer involved in controversial incidents

- Military career
- Allegiance: India
- Branch: Indian Army
- Rank: Major
- Unit: Rashtriya Rifles

Major Leetul Gogoi is an officer in the Indian Army who gained notoriety due to his involvement in two significant and highly criticized incidents in Jammu and Kashmir. The 2017 human shield incident and a 2018 hotel controversy involving a minor Kashmiri girl.

== Early life and career ==
Major Leetul Gogoi hails from Guwahati, Assam and was commissioned into the Indian Army, serving in the Rashtriya Rifles, a unit specializing in counter-insurgency operations. He is recognised for his involvement in the 2017 human shield incident in Jammu and Kashmir, where he used a civilian, Farooq Ahmad Dar, to deter stone-pelters during elections. He was awarded a commendation certificate by Army Chief General Bipin Rawat for his exceptional service.

== 2017 human shield Incident ==
In April 2017, during by-elections in Jammu and Kashmir, Major Gogoi was involved in a controversial incident in which he used a civilian, Farooq Ahmad Dar, as a human shield. Dar was tied to the front of a military jeep and driven through villages to deter stone-pelting protesters. The incident, which was caught on camera, drew widespread condemnation for violating international norms and human rights. Despite the outcry, Major Gogoi was defended by the Army, with General Bipin Rawat calling it an "innovative" tactic.

== 2018 hotel incident involving a minor ==
In May 2018, Major Leetul Gogoi was detained by police at a hotel in Srinagar after attempting to check in with a 17-year-old Kashmiri girl. The hotel staff alerted the authorities, leading to an investigation. The Jammu and Kashmir Police revealed that Major Gogoi faked his identity as a Muslim youth, Ubaid Arman, on Facebook to become friends with the Kashmiri girl and was accompanied by another soldier Sameer Malla. Later, the police claimed the girl was 19 years old, though sources, including her parents, indicated she was minor.

== See also ==
- 1991 Kunan Poshpora incident
- 2009 Shopian rape and murder case
- Rashtriya Rifles
- Human rights abuses in Jammu and Kashmir
- Armed Forces (Special Powers) Act
