= Pattacheruvanda C. Thimayya =

Indian army officer

Lieutenant General P C Thimayya PVSM, VSM, ADC
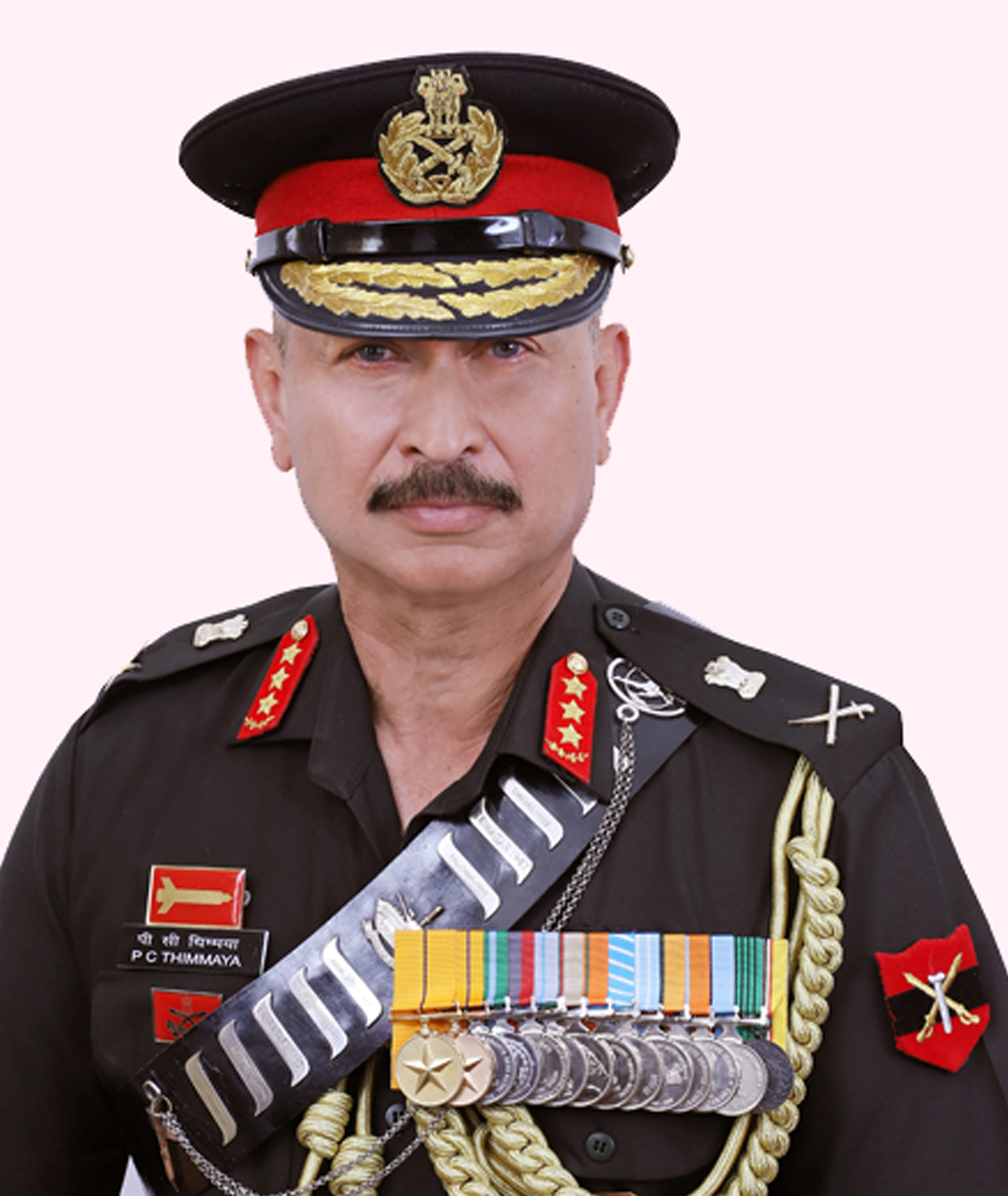
- Born: 4 April 1960 (age 66)
- Military career
- Allegiance: India
- Branch: Indian Army
- Service years: June 1981 – April 2020
- Rank: Lieutenant General
- Service number: IC-39438M
- Unit: Mechanised Infantry Regiment
- Commands: Army Training Command; X Corps; 5 Mech
- Awards: Param Vishisht Seva Medal; Vishisht Seva Medal

Lieutenant General Pattacheruvanda Chengappa Thimayya, PVSM, VSM, ADC is a former General Officer in the Indian Army. He was the 21st General Officer Commanding-in-Chief (GOC-in-C) Army Training Command. He assumed office on 1 November 2018 from Lt Gen Manoj Mukund Naravane.

== Early life and education ==
Thimayya was born in Chettalli, Virajpet, Karnataka to a Kodava family, and is the son of Pattacheruvanda Ponnappa Changappa and Gauru Changappa, Thimmaiah. He is an alumnus of Sainik School, Bhubaneswar; National Defence Academy, Pune and Indian Military Academy, Dehradun. He was a sword of honour winner at the Indian Military Academy.

== Career ==
Thimayya was commissioned into Mechanised Infantry Regiment in 1981. He has served on both the Western and Eastern fronts. He has commanded a mechanised infantry brigade; a strike RAPID division and X Corps (Bhatinda) (5 July 2017 – 20 July 2018). His staff appointments include Commandant of Army War College, Mhow; and Integrated Army HQ at MoD. He was promoted to Lieutenant General on 5 January 2017. He has also served as a military observer on the UN mission in Angola and as a Defence Attache to Bangladesh. He was the chief of the Mechanised Infantry Regiment.

Thimayya retired from the Army on 29 April 2020 after 39 years of service.

== Personal life ==
Thimayya is married to Neena Thimmaiah and they have two sons. Akshay Thimmaiah is studying Mass Communication and Arjun Thimmaiah is serving in the Indian Navy.

== Military awards and aecorations ==

Param Vishisht Seva Medal		Vishisht Seva Medal	
Samanya Seva Medal	Special Service Medal	Operation Vijay Medal	Operation Parakram Medal
Sainya Seva Medal	High Altitude Service Medal	Videsh Seva Medal	50th Anniversary of Independence Medal
30 Years Long Service Medal	20 Years Long Service Medal	9 Years Long Service Medal	UN Mission in Angola Ribbon

== Dates of rank ==
Insignia	Rank	Component	Date of rank
	Second Lieutenant	Indian Army	13 June 1981
	Lieutenant	Indian Army	13 June 1983
	Captain	Indian Army	13 June 1986
	Major	Indian Army	13 June 1992
	Lieutenant-Colonel	Indian Army	16 December 2004
	Colonel	Indian Army	1 October 2005
	Brigadier	Indian Army	13 March 2009 (seniority from 4 June 2008)
	Major General	Indian Army	27 March 2015 (seniority from 5 October 2011)
	Lieutenant-General	Indian Army	31 January 2017 (substantive, seniority from 1 July 2016)

Military offices
Preceded by Manoj Mukund Naravane	General Officer Commanding-in-Chief Army Training Command; 1 November 2018 - 29 April 2020	Succeeded by Raj Shukla
Preceded by Ashwani Kumar	General Officer Commanding X Corps; 5 July 2017 – 20 July 2018	Succeeded by Raj Shukla
