= Shrinjay Pratap Singh =

Lieutenant General in the Indian Army

Lieutenant General Shrinjay Pratap Singh AVSM YSM

General Officer Commanding-in-Chief Army Training Command
- Incumbent
- Assumed office 1 October 2026
- Chief of Army Staff: Dhiraj Seth
- Preceded by: Devendra Sharma

Military service
- Allegiance: India
- Branch/service: Indian Army
- Years of service: 10 June 1989 – Present
- Rank: Lieutenant General
- Unit: Kumaon Regiment
- Commands: Army Training Command; IX Corps; 21st Mountain Division
- Service number: IC-48530M
- Awards: Ati Vishisht Seva Medal; Yudh Seva Medal

Lieutenant General Shrinjay Pratap Singh, AVSM, YSM is a serving general officer of the Indian Army. He is currently serving as the General Officer Commanding-in-Chief, Army Training Command. He was previously serving as Director General, Defence Intelligence Agency & Deputy Chief of Integrated Defence Staff (Intelligence). He earlier served as the Chief of Staff, Southern Command, prior to that he was General Officer Commanding, IX Corps.

== Early life and education ==
He is an alumnus of the National Defence Academy, Khadakwasla and the Indian Military Academy, Dehradun. He is also an alumnus of Army War College, Mhow and the United States Army War College, Carlisle. He holds a master's degree from University of Madras and an MPhil from Devi Ahilya Vishwavidyalaya.

== Military career ==
The general officer was commissioned into the Kumaon Regiment on 10 June 1989 from the Indian Military Academy. In a career spanning over three decades, he has tenated various command and staff appointments. He has commanded an infantry battalion in the semi-desert sector, a brigade in counter insurgency and counter terrorism operations in Jammu and Kashmir and a division on the eastern borders. His staff appointments include being colonel (general staff) of an Infantry Division and as Brigadier General Staff at HQ XV Corps. As a Major general, he served as the General Officer Commanding, 21st Mountain Division.

Upon promotion to the rank of Lieutenant General, on 9 June 2023, he took over as the General Officer Commanding, IX Corps succeeding Lieutenant General Pushpendra Pal Singh. A year and a half later, on 1 October 2024, he assumed the appointment of Chief of Staff of Southern Command. On 31 May 2025, Lieutenant General S P Singh assumed the appointment of Director General, Defence Intelligence Agency & Deputy Chief of Integrated Defence Staff (Intelligence) succeeding Lieutenant General Dinesh Singh Rana who moved to Andaman Nicobar Command as CINCAN.

On 1 October 2026, he took over as the General Officer Commanding-in-Chief, Army Training Command succeeding Lieutenant General Devendra Sharma.

== Personal life ==
He is one of the two sons of Major Dhirendra Nath Singh, who was an officer in the Kumaon Regiment and a veteran of the India–Pakistan War of 1965. His brother, Lieutenant General Viresh Pratap Singh Kaushik is a serving officer in the Indian Army.

== Awards and decorations ==
During his career, he has been awarded the Ati Vishisht Seva Medal in 2025 and the Yudh Seva Medal. He has received commendation from the Chief of Army Staff.

Ati Vishisht Seva Medal		Yudh Seva Medal	
Samanya Seva Medal	Special Service Medal		Operation Vijay Medal
Operation Parakram Medal	Sainya Seva Medal	High Altitude Medal	75th Independence Anniversary Medal
50th Independence Anniversary Medal	30 Years Long Service Medal	20 Years Long Service Medal	9 Years Long Service Medal

== Date of ranks ==
Insignia	Rank	Component	Date of rank
	Second Lieutenant	Indian Army	10 June 1989
	Lieutenant	Indian Army	10 June 1991
	Captain	Indian Army	10 June 1994
	Major	Indian Army	10 June 2000
	Lieutenant Colonel	Indian Army	16 December 2004
	Colonel	Indian Army	1 May 2009
	Brigadier	Indian Army	1 May 2015 (acting) 1 December 2016 (substantive with seniority from 10 July 2014)
	Major General	Indian Army	10 December 2020 (seniority from 19 July 2019)
	Lieutenant General	Indian Army	9 June 2023

Military offices
Preceded by Devendra Sharma	General Officer Commanding-in-Chief Army Training Command; 1 October 2026 - Present	Succeeded by Incumbent
Preceded by Dinesh Singh Rana	Director General Defence Intelligence Agency & Deputy Chief of Integrated Defence Staff (Int); 31 May 2025 - 30 September 2026	Succeeded by V. Hariharan
Preceded by Manjit Kumar	Chief of Staff, Southern Command; 1 October 2024 – 30 May 2025	Succeeded by Sandeep Jain
Preceded by Pushpendra Pal Singh	General Officer Commanding; IX Corps; 9 June 2023 – 30 September 2024	Succeeded by Rajan Sharawat
