= X Corps (India) =

Military field formation of the Indian Army

- X Corps Formation Sign
- Active: 1979 - present
- Country: India
- Branch: Indian Army
- Role: Holding Corps
- Part of: South Western Command
- Garrison/HQ: Bathinda
- Nickname: Chetak Corps

Commanders
- Current commander: Lt Gen Vikrant Suresh Deshpande, AVSM
- Notable commanders: Lt Gen Lakshman Singh Rawat; Lt Gen Pattiarimal M Hariz; Lt Gen Dewan Rabindranath Soni; Lt Gen P C Thimayya; Lt Gen Raj Shukla; Lt Gen Ajai Singh

X Corps is a corps of the Indian Army. It is based in Bathinda and is a part of the South Western Command.

The X (Chetak) Corps was raised at Bathinda on 1 July 1979 by Lieutenant General ML Tuli, to reduce the load of XI Corps. The new corps took over south Punjab and north Rajasthan.

== Organisation ==
The corps has two of the army's Reorganised Army Plains Infantry Divisions (RAPIDs).

It consists of:

- 16 Infantry Division (Amogh Division) headquartered at Sri Ganganagar, Rajasthan
- 18 Infantry Division (RAPID) (Gandiv Division) at Kota, Rajasthan
- 24 Infantry Division (RAPID) (Ranbankura Division) at Bikaner, Rajasthan. In 2001, 24th Artillery Brigade and 180th Armoured Brigade were at Bikaner, 25th Infantry Brigade was at Bathinda, Punjab and 83rd Infantry Brigade was at Lalgarh Jattan.
- 6 (Independent) Armoured Brigade (Sand Viper Brigade) at Suratgarh, Rajasthan
- 615 (Independent) Air Defence Brigade (2 Regiments of Shilka and Tunguska (514 AD Regm. (SP)) and 1 Regiment of SA-6 and SA-13).

== Formation Sign ==
At the time of re-raising, 10 corps adopted the present divisional formation sign. The formation sign was designed by its first General Officer Commanding (GOC) - Lieutenant General ML Tuli. The design consists of the 'red-white-red background' depicting a corps of the Indian Army and a horse with the torso of a man.

Chetak, traditionally the horse ridden by Maharana Pratap at the Battle of Haldighati is associated with Rajput chivalry and is symbolic of mobility and manoeuvre. Th horse is poised in a bid to spring into action, which symbolises optimum readiness. The torso of a soldier is depicted in a power packed stance launching a spear at the enemy - which symbolises instant alertness for aggressive action to face any challenge.

== List of Commanders ==
Rank	Name	Appointment Date	Left office	Unit of Commission	References
Lieutenant General	ML Tuli	1 July 1979		Garhwal Rifles	
Lieutenant General	Himmeth Singh		April 1983	Brigade of the Guards	
Lieutenant General	Mathew Thomas	April 1983	20 January 1985	Parachute Regiment	
Lieutenant General	Lakshman Singh Rawat	June 1985	June 1986	11th Gorkha Rifles	
Lieutenant General	Faridoon Noshir Bilimoria	October 1987	1989	5th Gorkha Rifles (Frontier Force)	
Lieutenant General	Chandra Shekhar	November 1993		4th Gorkha Rifles	
Lieutenant General	Gopal Krishan Duggal		18 January 2001	Maratha Light Infantry	
Lieutenant General	Mohinder Puri	19 January 2001	11 March 2004	3rd Gorkha Rifles	
Lieutenant General	OP Nandrajog	12 March 2004	December 2005	Brigade of the Guards	
Lieutenant General	N S Brar	1 April 2006	2007	Regiment of Artillery	
Lieutenant General	R S Sujlana	2007	28 September 2008	Sikh Regiment	
Lieutenant General	D S Chauhan	29 September 2008		Madras Regiment	
Lieutenant General	Kongara Surendra Nath		31 December 2010	Mechanised Infantry Regiment	
Lieutenant General	Sanjiv Chachra	January 2011	January 2012	Rajput Regiment	
Lieutenant General	Sanjeev Anand	January 2012	2013	Mechanised Infantry Regiment	
Lieutenant General	NS Ghei	2013	June 2014	Parachute Regiment	
Lieutenant General	Pattiarimal Mohamadali Hariz	June 2014	17 June 2015	Mechanised Infantry Regiment	
Lieutenant General	Dewan Rabindranath Soni	18 June 2015	16 September 2016	Central India Horse	
Lieutenant General	Ashwani Kumar	September 2016	July 2017	Corps of Army Air Defence	
Lieutenant General	P C Thimayya	5 July 2017	5 July 2018	Mechanised Infantry Regiment	
Lieutenant General	Raj Shukla	5 July 2018	30 July 2019	Regiment of Artillery	
Lieutenant General	Ajai Singh	30 July 2019	25 August 2020	81 Armoured Regiment	
Lieutenant General	Manoj Kumar Mago	26 August 2020	28 October 2021	Brigade of the Guards	
Lieutenant General	JB Chaudhari	29 October 2021	6 November 2022	Brigade of the Guards	
Lieutenant General	Sanjiv Rai	7 November 2022	31 December 2023	Sikh Light Infantry	
Lieutenant General	Nagendra Singh	1 January 2024	31 May 2025	Panjab Regiment	
Lieutenant General	Shamsher Singh Virk	1 July 2025	31 August 2026	Garhwal Rifles	
Lieutenant General	Vikrant Suresh Deshpande	1 September 2026	Incumbent	11th Gorkha Rifles	
