= Dewan Rabindranath Soni =

Indian Army general

Lieutenant General D R Soni PVSM, VSM
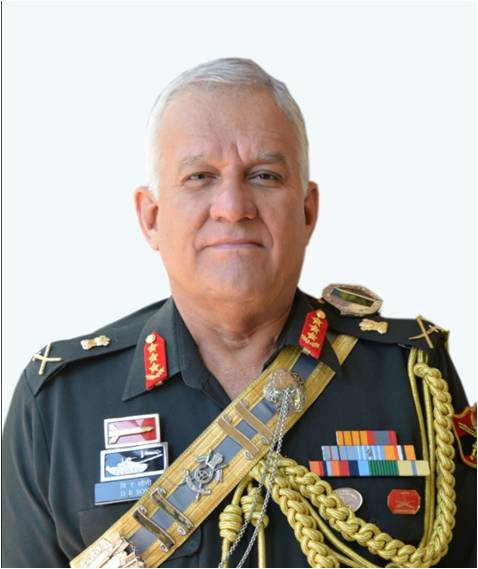
- Spouse: Colonel Suman Soni (retd.)
- Military career
- Allegiance: India
- Branch: Indian Army
- Service years: June 1979 – September 2018
- Rank: Lieutenant General
- Service number: IC-35987P
- Unit: Central India Horse
- Commands: Southern Command; Army Training Command; X Corps; 47 Armoured Regiment
- Awards: Param Vishisht Seva Medal; Vishisht Seva Medal

Lieutenant General Dewan Rabindranath Soni, PVSM, VSM is a former General Officer-Commanding-in-Chief (GOC-in-C), Southern Command of the Indian Army. He served in office from 1 December 2017 till 30 September 2018. He assumed the post after Lieutenant General P M Hariz retired and was succeeded by Lieutenant General Satinder Kumar Saini.

== Education and personal life ==
Soni is an alumnus of the National Defence Academy, Khadakwasla and Indian Military Academy, Dehradun. In addition, he attended the Junior Command, Senior Command and Higher Command Courses at Army War College, Mhow; the Staff Course at Defence Services Staff College, Wellington; and the Combat Group Commanders Course at Armoured Corps Centre and School, Ahmednagar. He also has a master's degree in Global Security from Cranfield University and attended the Defence College of Management and Technology, Shrivenham in the United Kingdom.

He is a sportsman and likes golf and tennis. He is married to Colonel Suman Soni (retd.), who served in the Army as a gynecologist for twenty-two years.

== Career ==
Soni was commissioned into the Central India Horse, a tank regiment of the Indian Army, in June 1979. Later, he was transferred to the 47 Armoured Regiment on its raising in 1983. He has commanded an armoured brigade; an armoured division; 47 armoured Regiment (July 1999 - December 2001), X Corps (Bhatinda) (18 June 2015 – 16 September 2016) and GOC-in-C, Army Training Command (17 September 2016 – 30 November 2017). He has held various staff appointments including Brigade Major of an armoured brigade; Colonel Administration of a Counter Insurgency Force in Jammu and Kashmir, and Colonel General Staff of a Mountain Division in the Eastern Sector. He was also deputed as a military observer in Iraq and Kuwait after the Gulf War.

During 39 years of his career, he has been awarded the Param Vishisht Seva Medal (2018), Vishisht Seva Medal (2015), the Chief of the Army Staff’s Commendation Card and the Commendation Card of the General Officer Commanding-in-Chief (GOC-in-C), Western Command.

Lt. Gen. Soni retired on September 30, 2018, and was succeeded as the GOC-in-C of the Southern Command by Lt. Gen. S.K. Saini.

Military offices
Preceded by P M Hariz	General Officer-Commanding-in-Chief Southern Command; 1 December 2017 - 30 September 2018	Succeeded by Satinder Kumar Saini
Preceded by P M Hariz	General Officer-Commanding-in-Chief Army Training Command; 17 September 2016 – 30 November 2017	Succeeded by Manoj Mukund Naravane
Preceded by P M Hariz	General Officer Commanding X Corps; 18 June 2015 – 16 September 2016	Succeeded by P C Thimmaya
