= Pattiarimal Mohamadali Hariz =

Former General Officer Commander-in-Chief, Southern Command of the Indian Army

Lieutenant General P M Hariz PVSM, AVSM, SM, VSM, ADC
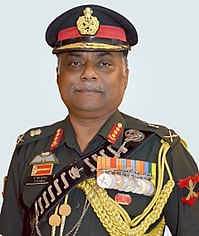
- Born: Kozhikode, Kerala, India
- Military career
- Allegiance: India
- Branch: Indian Army
- Service years: 10 June 1978 – 30 November 2017
- Rank: Lieutenant General
- Service number: IC-35137L
- Unit: 12 Mechanised Infantry
- Commands: Southern Army; Army Training Command; X Corps
- Awards: Param Vishisht Seva Medal; Ati Vishisht Seva Medal; Sena Medal; Vishisht Seva Medal

Lieutenant General Pattiarimal Mohamadali Hariz, PVSM, AVSM, SM, VSM, ADC is the former General Officer-Commanding-in-Chief (GOC-in-C) Southern Command of the Indian Army and served in office from 1 September 2016 to 30 November 2017. He assumed the post from General Bipin Rawat and was succeeded by Dewan Rabindranath Soni.

== Early life and education ==
Hariz was born in Kozhikode, Kerala, India and is the son of Pattiarimmal and Fathima Mohamadali. He is an alumnus of Sainik School, Amaravathinagar and National Defence Academy, Pune. He also attended the staff course at Staff College Camberly; higher command course at Army War College, Mhow and National Defence College, New Delhi.

== Career ==
Hariz was commissioned into the 12th battalion, Mechanised Infantry Regiment (8th Parachute Regiment/16th Mahar Regiment), a mechanized infantry battalion, on 10 June 1978. He has vast experience and has served in numerous positions. He has commanded the 9th battalion, Mechanised Infantry Regiment, a brigade with an amphibious role, a RAPID division in a Strike Corps and X Corps (Bhatinda). He has also held numerous staff appointments including Brigade Major of an armoured brigade, Assistant Military Secretary at the Military Secretary's branch, a Staff Officer in Weapons and Equipment Directorate at IHQ, New Delhi; instructor at Infantry School, Mhow; instructor at Defence Services Staff College, Wellington; Additional Directorate General of Mechanised Forces and GOC-in-C of the Army Training Command. He held various appointments including Military observer, Chief Personal Office and Regional Commander at the UN Mission in Angola.

During his career he has been awarded the Vishisht Seva Medal in 2007, Sena Medal in 2009, Ati Vishisht Seva Medal and Param Vishisht Seva Medal in 2016 for his service.

On 17 December 2016, the Government of India appointed Lt Gen Bipin Rawat as the 27th Chief of the Army Staff, superseding Lieutenant General Praveen Bakshi (Eastern Army Commander) and him.The appointment made by NDA ruled Government was politically controversial.General Bipin Rawat was accused of nepotism and gratuitously politicising the appointment, by the senior serving and retired military officers.

== Honours and decorations ==

| Param Vishisht Seva Medal | Ati Vishisht Seva Medal | Sena Medal | Vishisht Seva Medal |
| Operation Vijay Medal | Sainya Seva Medal (Bar) | Videsh Seva Medal | 50th Anniversary of Independence Medal |
| 30 Years Long Service Medal | 20 Years Long Service Medal | 9 Years Long Service Medal | NAVEMU |

== Personal life ==
He is married to Zarina Hariz and they have a son who is also an officer in the Mechanised Infantry Regiment and a daughter who is a teacher. His brother, Arif Mohamadali, is a retired commander of the Indian Navy.

Military offices
| Preceded by Bipin Rawat | General Officer-Commanding-in-Chief Southern Command; 1 September 2016 – 30 November 2017 | Succeeded by Dewan Rabindranath Soni |
| Preceded by Sanjeev Madhok | General Officer-Commanding-in-Chief Army Training Command; 1 August 2015 – 31 August 2016 | Succeeded by Dewan Rabindranath Soni |
| Preceded by NS Ghei | General Officer Commanding X Corps; 2014 - 17 June 2015 | Succeeded by Dewan Rabindranath Soni |
