= Raj Shukla =

Lieutenant General in the Indian Army

Lieutenant General Raj Shukla PVSM, YSM, SM, ADC
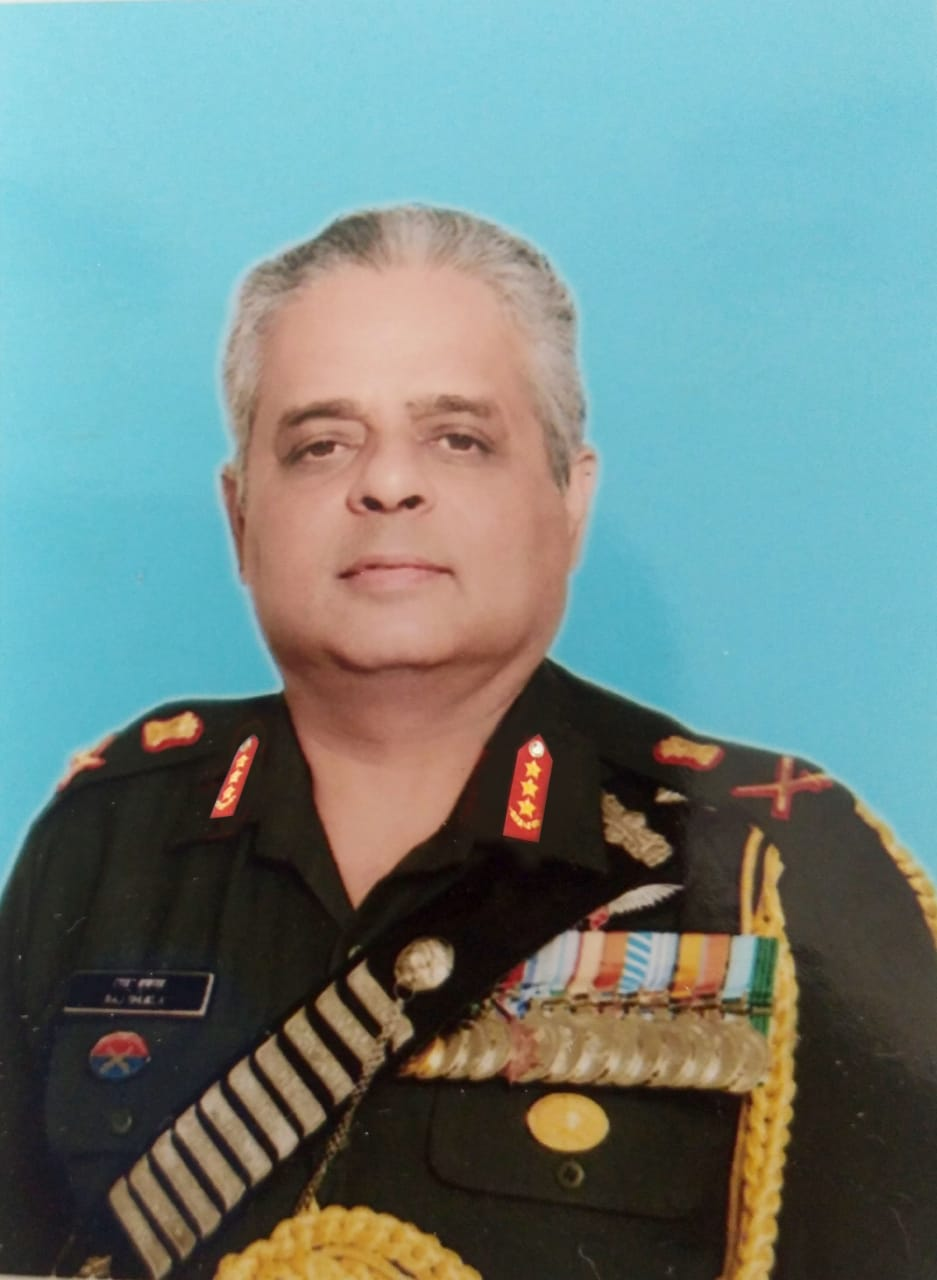
- Military career
- Allegiance: India
- Branch: Indian Army
- Service years: December 1982 – 31 March 2022
- Rank: Lieutenant General
- Service number: IC-40685A
- Unit: Regiment of Artillery
- Commands: Army Training Command; X Corps
- Awards: Param Vishisht Seva Medal; Yudh Seva Medal; Sena Medal

Lieutenant General Raj Shukla, PVSM, YSM, SM, ADC is a retired General Officer of the Indian Army who served as the General Officer Commanding-in-Chief of the Army Training Command (GOC-in-C ARTRAC). He assumed office on 1 May 2020, succeeding Lt Gen P C Thimayya. He superannuated on 31 March 2022. He is currently, a member of the Union Public Service Commission.

== Early life and education ==
Shukla is an alumnus of Uttar Pradesh Sainik School Lucknow, National Defence Academy Khadakwasla Pune and Indian Military Academy. Shukla was commissioned into the Regiment of Artillery in December 1982. He has also attended the Defence Services Staff College, the Higher Defence Management Course at the College of Defence Management and the National Defence College.

== Career ==
Shukla has commanded a Medium Regiment in the Eastern theatre as part of a Mountain Division. He later took the regiment to the Desert as part of a Strike Corps. He has also commanded an Infantry brigade in Counter-insurgency operations and an infantry division in the Kashmir Valley, along the Line of Control. He is a qualified aviator and has flown along the borders in Sikkim and in the North–East.

In his staff appointments, Shukla has served as the General Staff Officer, Grade I (GSO-I) of an infantry division as well as two tenures in the Military Operations directorate at Army Headquarters. He has also served in instructional appointments in the School of Artillery and the Indian Military Training Team in Bhutan.

On 5 July 2018, Shukla took command of the X Corps at Bhatinda from Lt Gen P C Thimayya. After an year's stint at the helm of X Corps, he relinquished command on 30 July 2019, handing over to Lt Gen Ajai Singh. He subsequently took over as the Director General Perspective Planning (DGPP) at Integrated Headquarters of the Ministry of Defence.

On 1 May 2020, Shukla took over as the General Officer Commanding-in Chief Army Training Command from Lt Gen P C Thimayya.

Shukla has been a Research Fellow at the Institute for Defense Studies and Analyses and a visiting fellow at the Centre for Land Warfare Studies.

== Military awards and decorations ==
He is a recipient of the Param Vishisht Seva Medal, Yudh Seva Medal and the Sena Medal.

| Param Vishist Seva Medal | Yudh Seva Medal | Sena Medal | |
| Samanya Seva Medal | Special Service Medal | Operation Vijay Star | Operation Vijay Medal |
| Operation Parakram Medal | Sainya Seva Medal | High Altitude Service Medal | Videsh Seva Medal |
| 50th Anniversary of Independence Medal | 30 Years Long Service Medal | 20 Years Long Service Medal | 9 Years Long Service Medal |

== Dates of rank ==
| Insignia | Rank | Component | Date of rank |
|---|---|---|---|
| | Second Lieutenant | Indian Army | 24 December 1982 |
| | Lieutenant | Indian Army | 24 December 1984 |
| | Captain | Indian Army | 24 December 1987 |
| | Major | Indian Army | 24 December 1993 |
| | Lieutenant-Colonel | Indian Army | 16 December 2004 |
| | Colonel | Indian Army | 1 March 2006 |
| | Brigadier | Indian Army | 7 May 2010 (substantive, seniority from 22 January 2009) |
| | Major General | Indian Army | 1 June 2015 (substantive, seniority from 10 June 2012) |
| | Lieutenant-General | Indian Army | 1 September 2017 |

Military offices
| Preceded by P C Thimayya | General Officer Commanding-in-Chief Army Training Command; 1 May 2020 – 31 March 2022 | Succeeded by Surinder Singh Mahal |
| Preceded by P C Thimayya | General Officer Commanding X Corps; June 2018 - July 2019 | Succeeded by Ajai Singh |
