= M. M. Naravane =

28th Chief of the Army Staff (India)

General Manoj Mukund Narvane PVSM AVSM SM VSM
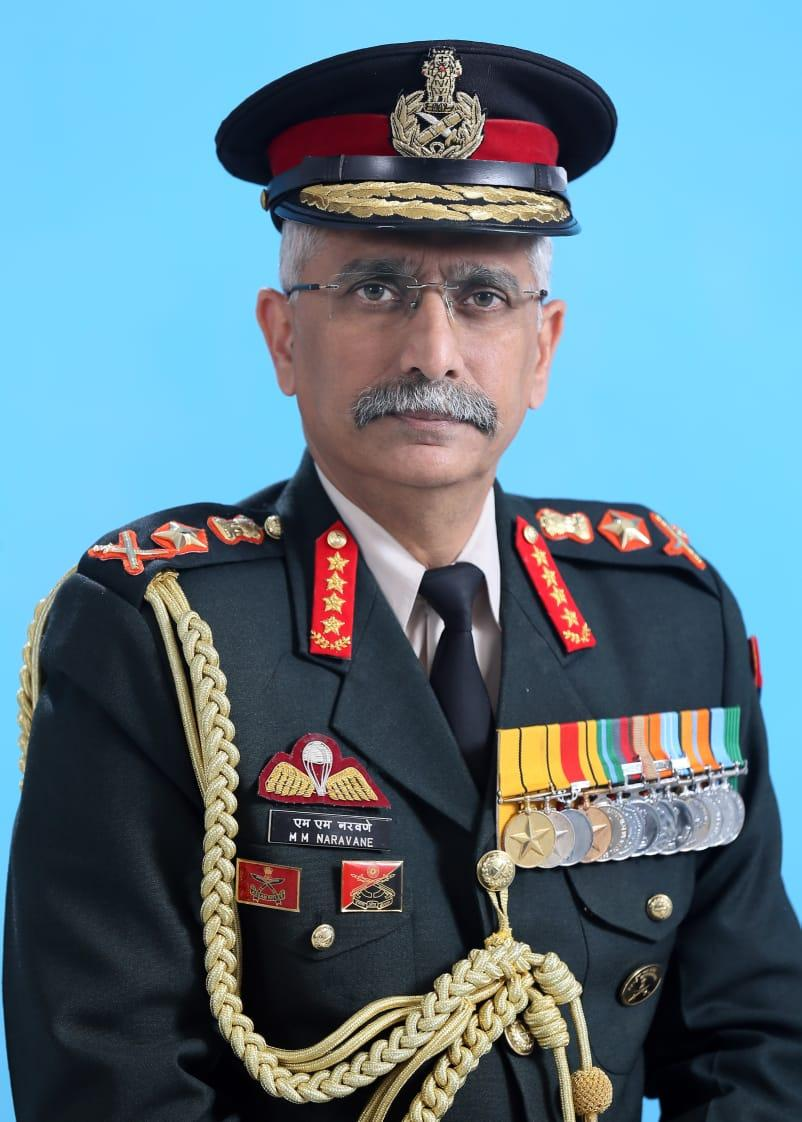
- Official portrait, 2020

Acting Chairman of the Chiefs of Staff Committee
- In office 15 December 2021 – 30 April 2022
- President: Ram Nath Kovind
- Preceded by: Bipin Rawat
- Succeeded by: Anil Chauhan

28th Chief of the Army Staff
- In office 31 December 2019 – 30 April 2022
- President: Ram Nath Kovind
- Preceded by: Bipin Rawat
- Succeeded by: Manoj Pande

40th Vice Chief of the Army Staff
- In office 1 September 2019 – 31 December 2019
- President: Ram Nath Kovind
- Chief of Army Staff: Bipin Rawat
- Preceded by: Devraj Anbu
- Succeeded by: Satinder Kumar Saini

General Officer Commanding-in-Chief Eastern Command
- In office 1 October 2018 – 31 August 2019
- Preceded by: Abhay Krishna
- Succeeded by: Anil Chauhan

General Officer Commanding-in-Chief Army Training Command
- In office 1 December 2017 – 30 September 2018
- Preceded by: Dewan Rabindranath Soni
- Succeeded by: Pattacheruvanda C. Thimayya

Personal details
- Born: Manoj Mukund Naravane; 22 April 1960 (age 66) Poona, Bombay State, India
- Spouse: Veena Naravane

Military service
- Allegiance: India
- Branch/service: Indian Army
- Years of service: June 1980 – 30 April 2022
- Rank: General
- Unit: 7 Sikh Light Infantry
- Commands: Eastern Command; Army Training Command; Delhi Area; II Corps; IGAR (North); 106 Infantry Brigade; 2 RR (SikhLI)
- Service number: IC-38750H
- Awards: Param Vishisht Seva Medal; Ati Vishisht Seva Medal; Sena Medal; Vishisht Seva Medal

General Manoj Mukund Naravane (born 22 April 1960) is a retired Indian Army general who served as the 28th Chief of the Army Staff (COAS), as well as the temporary Chairman of the Chiefs of Staff Committee from 15 December 2021 until his superannuation on 30 April 2022.

He took over as COAS from Bipin Rawat on 31 December 2019. Prior to his appointment as the COAS, the general officer served as the fortieth Vice Chief of Army Staff of the Indian Army, General Officer Commanding-in-Chief (GOC-in-C) of Eastern Command and General Officer Commanding-in-Chief of Army Training Command. He also served as General Officer Commanding II Corps and also as General Officer Commanding Delhi Area.

== Early life and education ==
General Naravane was born on 22 April 1960 in Poona, Bombay State, to Chitpavan Brahmin parents. His father Mukund Naravane was a former officer in the Indian Air Force who retired at the rank of wing commander, while his mother Sudha was an announcer with the All India Radio. He completed his schooling at the Jnana Prabodhini Prashala.

He is an alumnus of National Defence Academy, Pune and Indian Military Academy, Dehradun. He also holds a master's degree in Defence Studies from University of Madras, Chennai and an M.Phil. in Defence and Management Studies from Devi Ahilya Vishwavidyalaya, Indore and he is also pursuing PhD in defence and strategic studies from Punjabi University, Patiala. Naravane has attended the Defence Services Staff College, Wellington and the Army War College, Mhow.

== Military career ==
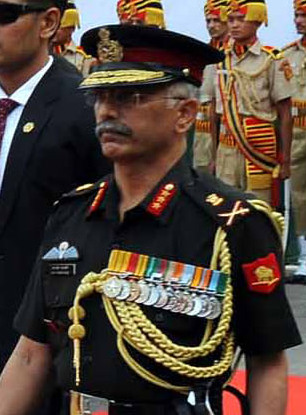
Naravane on Independence Day in Delhi, August 15, 2017

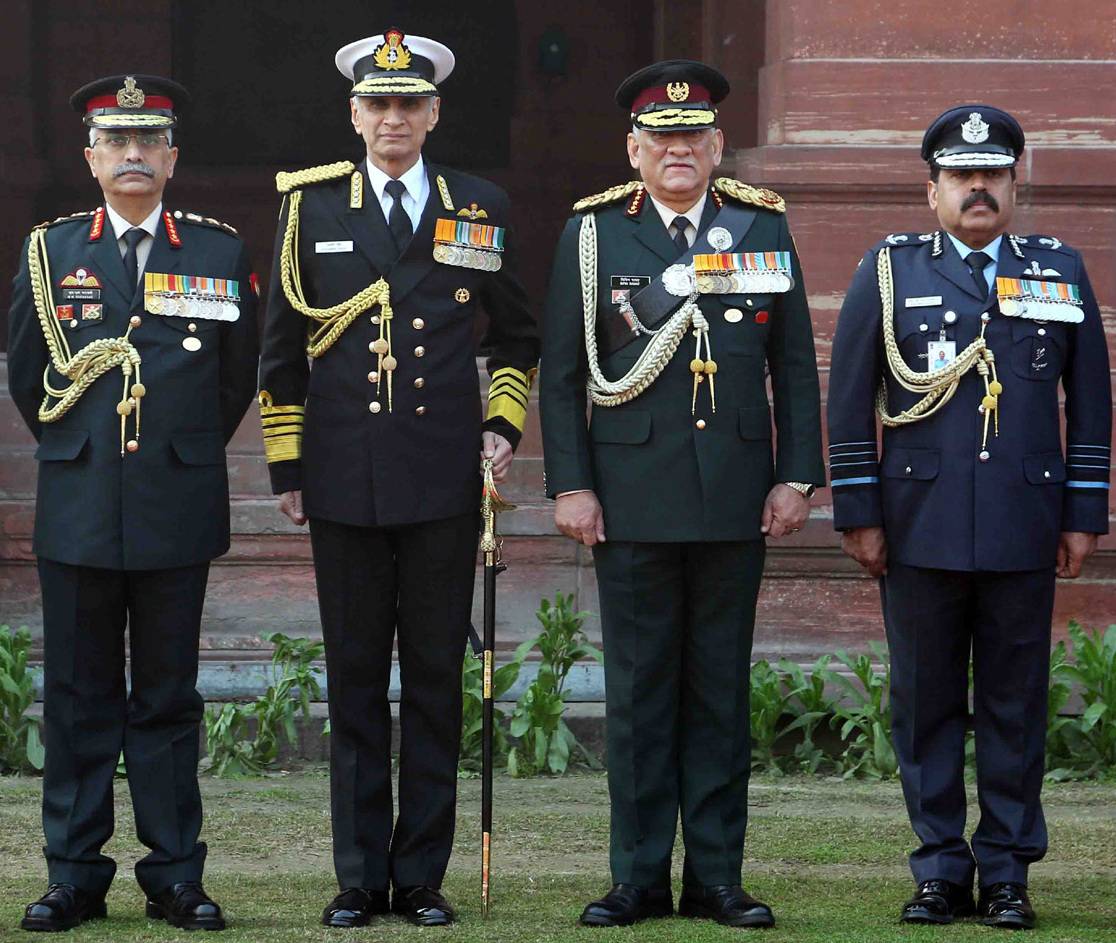
Bipin Rawat, Naravane (left), Karambir Singh and R. K. S. Bhadauria in 2020

Gen Naravane was commissioned into the 7th battalion of the Sikh Light Infantry in June 1980. He later commanded the 2nd Battalion (SikhLi) of Rashtriya Rifles in Jammu and Kashmir as well as the 106 Infantry Brigade. He also led the Assam Rifles as Inspector General (North) in Kohima, Nagaland. He has served in counter-insurgency operations in Jammu and Kashmir and Northeast India, as well as the Indian Peace Keeping Force in Sri Lanka during Operation Pawan. The general officer's staff assignments include tenures as a brigade major of an Infantry Brigade, Assistant Adjutant & Quartermaster General (AA&QMG) of Headquarters Establishment No. 22. He has also served as the Military attaché to Myanmar at Yangon.

In addition, he served in an instructional appointment at the Army War College, Mhow as Directing Staff in the Higher Command Wing and two tenures at the Integrated Defence Staff Headquarters of Ministry of Defence, New Delhi.

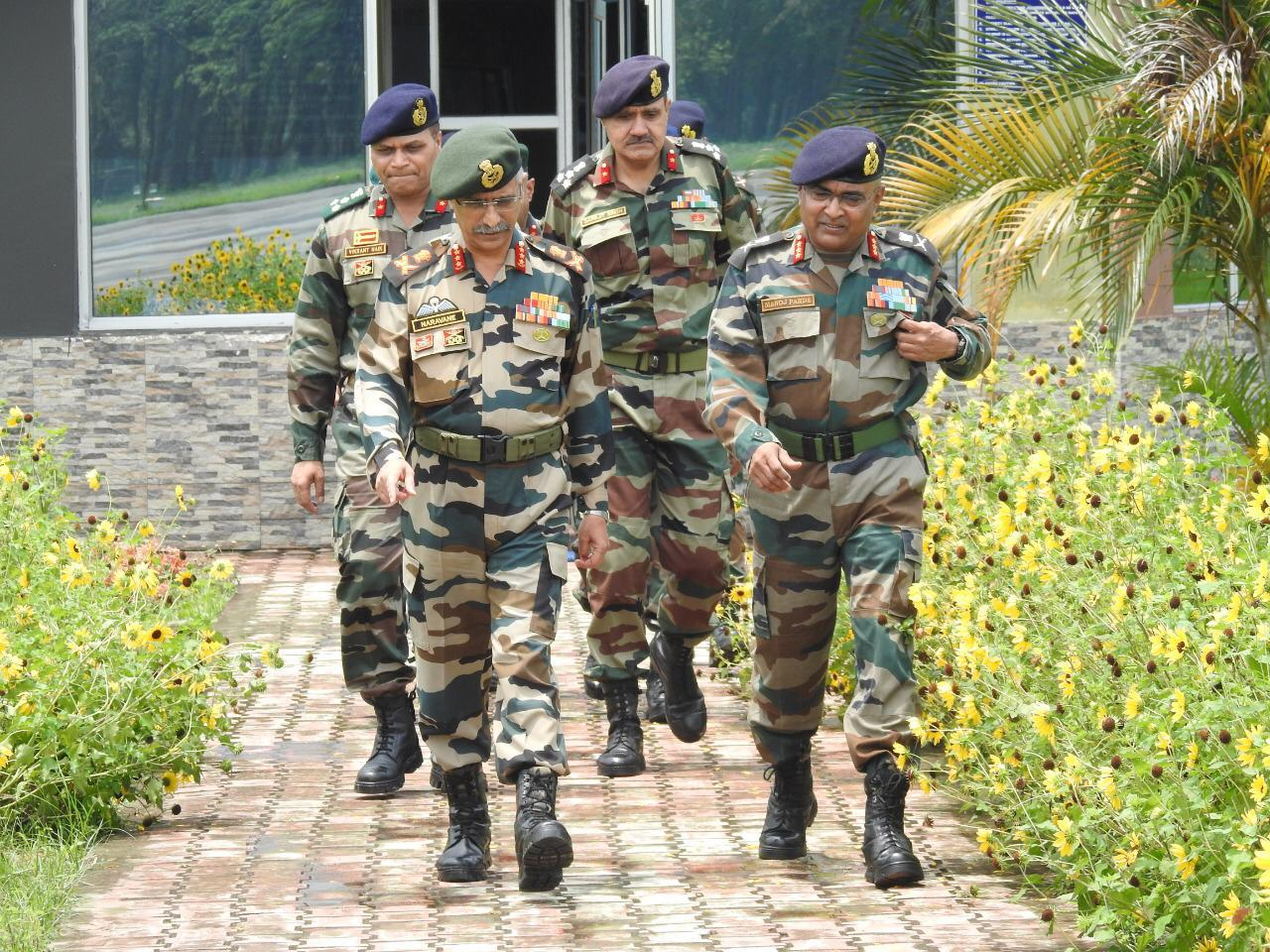

On promotion to the rank of Lieutenant general, he commanded the Ambala-based Kharga Strike Corps and served as the general officer commanding (GOC) Delhi Area. As GOC Delhi Area, he commanded the 2017 Republic Day Parade.

After being promoted to Army Commander grade, Gen Naravane served as General Officer Commanding-in-Chief Army Training Command from 1 December 2017 to 30 September 2018. Later, he also served as General Officer Commanding-in-Chief Eastern Command from 1 October 2018 to 31 August 2019, succeeding Lt Gen Abhay Krishna.

On 1 September 2019, he took over as Vice Chief of the Army Staff when Lt Gen Devraj Anbu retired on 31 August, and became the senior-most serving general after Bipin Rawat. On 16 December 2019 — Vijay Diwas — he was announced as the successor of Rawat as COAS on 31 December 2019. Gen Naravane was the 3rd general from the Sikh Light Infantry to become Chief of the Army Staff; the others were Ved Prakash Malik, the 18th COAS, and Bikram Singh, the 25th COAS.

== Personal life ==
He is from Pune, Maharashtra. He paints, practices yoga, and gardens, his wife, Veena Naravane, is a teacher and former president of Army Wives Welfare Association. They have two daughters.

After retirement from service, he published several books. His memoir, Four Stars of Destiny, was scheduled for publication in 2024 but delayed due to reviewing process by the Ministry of Defence. His military thriller novel The Cantonment Conspiracy about two National Defence Academy officers investigating a case of assault and murder in a garrison was published in 2025.

== Honours and decorations ==
He has received the Param Vishisht Seva Medal (2019), Ati Vishisht Seva Medal (2017), Sena Medal, Vishist Seva Medal (2015), and the COAS commendation card for his service. He was also the Colonel of the Regiment of the Sikh Light Infantry.

Param Vishisht Seva Medal		Ati Vishisht Seva Medal	
Sena Medal	Vishisht Seva Medal		Samanya Seva Medal
Special Service Medal	Operation Parakram Medal	Sainya Seva Medal	Videsh Seva Medal
50th Anniversary of Independence Medal	30 Years Long Service Medal	20 Years Long Service Medal	9 Years Long Service Medal

== Dates of rank ==
Insignia	Rank	Component	Date of rank
	Second Lieutenant	Indian Army	7 June 1980
	Lieutenant	Indian Army	7 June 1982
	Captain	Indian Army	7 June 1985
	Major	Indian Army	7 June 1991
	Lieutenant-Colonel	Indian Army	31 December 2002
	Colonel	Indian Army	1 February 2005
	Brigadier	Indian Army	19 July 2010 (substantive, seniority from 13 January 2008)
	Major General	Indian Army	1 January 2013 (substantive, seniority from 7 April 2011)
	Lieutenant-General	Indian Army	10 November 2015 (substantive)
	General (COAS)	Indian Army	1 January 2020

== See also ==
- Naravane, Manoj Mukund (May 2024). Four Stars of Destiny. Penguin Random House India Pvt. Limited. ISBN 978-0-670-09975-7.

Military offices
Preceded by Bipin Rawat (as CDS)	Chairman of the Chiefs of Staff Committee; Acting; 15 December 2021 – 30 April 2022	Succeeded by Anil Chauhan (as CDS)
Preceded by Bipin Rawat	Chief of the Army Staff; 31 December 2019 – 30 April 2022	Succeeded by Manoj Pande
Preceded by Devraj Anbu	Vice Chief of the Army Staff; 1 September 2019 – 30 December 2019	Succeeded by Satinder Kumar Saini
Preceded by Abhay Krishna	General Officer Commanding-in-Chief Eastern Command; 1 October 2018 – 31 August 2019	Succeeded by Anil Chauhan
Preceded by Dewan Rabindranath Soni	General Officer Commanding-in-Chief Army Training Command; 1 December 2017 – 30 September 2018	Succeeded by Pattacheruvanda C Thimayya
Preceded by Vijay Singh	General Officer Commanding Delhi Area; January 2017- 30 November 2017	Succeeded by Asit Mistry
Preceded by Amarjeet Singh	General Officer Commanding Kharga Corps; January 2016 - January 2017	Succeeded by Jaiveer Singh Negi
