= Kashmir human shield incident =

War crime by Indian forces in Indian Administered Kashmir

Kashmir human shield incident occurred on April 9, 2017, in Jammu and Kashmir during the Srinagar Lok Sabha by-election. A 26-year-old man captured by the Indian Army, was tied as a human shield to the front of a Jeep belonging to Indian Army as a column of Indian troops was moving through a locality. The man was reportedly tied to the vehicle to dissuade other Kashmiri protestors from hurling stones at the Indian troops. The man was accused of being involved in throwing stones at Indian troops. The Government of India stated that it would stand by the officer who decided to use the "insurgent" as a human shield.

Forcing non-combatants to serve as human shields is a war crime according to the 1949 Geneva Conventions, the 1977 Additional Protocol I to the Geneva Conventions, and the 1998 Rome Statute.

After investigation, J&K Human Rights Commission ordered the Government of Jammu and Kashmir to pay 10 lakh (1 million) rupees as compensation to man used as human shield. Jammu and Kashmir government refused to pay.

Major Leetul Gogoi who was in charge of the soldiers during the event, was awarded a Chief of Army Staff Commendation Card by General Bipin Rawat for "counter-insurgency operations".
