= F. N. Billimoria =

Indian Army officer (1933–2005)

Lieutenant General F N Billimoria PVSM
- Born: 1933; India
- Died: 2005 (aged 71–72)
- Relatives: Karan Bilimoria, Baron Bilimoria (son)
- Military career
- Allegiance: British Indian Empire; India
- Branch: British Indian Army; Indian Army
- Service years: 1955–1993
- Rank: Lieutenant General
- Nickname: Billy
- Unit: 2/5 Gorkha Rifles
- Commands: Central Command; X Corps; 27th Mountain Division; 2/5 Gorkha Rifles
- Conflicts: Indo-Pakistani War of 1971
- Awards: Param Vishisht Seva Medal

Lieutenant General Faridoon Noshir 'Billy' Billimoria, PVSM (1933–2005) was an Indian Army officer who was the 15th General Officer Commanding-in-Chief Central Command. He commanded a battalion in the Indo-Pakistani War of 1971. He was also the commandant of the Defence Services Staff College in 1986.

== Early life and education ==
Bilimoria attended The Doon School and then joined the 2nd course of the Joint Services Wing (JSW), a forerunner of the National Defence Academy (NDA).

== Career ==
Bilimoria was commissioned into the Indian Army on 7 June 1953 in the 5 Gorkha Rifles (Frontier Force). He graduated from the Defence Services Staff College. He served as aide-de-camp to the first Indian President, Dr Rajendra Prasad between January 1959 to May 1961. He moved to Congo with his battalion as part of the United Nations Forces between 1962 and 1963. He took command of 2/5 Gorkha Rifles in October 1969 and saw action during the Indo-Pakistani War of 1971. He was the Indian Army liaison officer with the School of Infantry, Warminster from 1973 for three years.

After being promoted to a Brigadier, he commanded an infantry brigade in Rajasthan and then was posted as Brigadier General Staff to a corps in the Northern Sector and subsequently as a Deputy General Officer Commanding to an Infantry Division in the Northern Sector. On promotion to Major General, he commanded a Mountain Division in the Eastern Sector and then became the Deputy Commandant and Chief Instructor at the Indian Military Academy. He was promoted to the rank of Lieutenant General and took over as Commandant of the Defence Services Staff College in February 1986. He took over command of 10 Corps in October 1987.

He took over as Army Commander of Central Command on 1 November 1989. Bilimoria, while he was the Central Army Commander, was also sent by the Government of India to Sri Lanka in 1990 to review the work of the Indian Peace Keeping Force which had been deployed during the Sri Lankan Civil War under the Indo-Sri Lanka Accord, and it was on his recommendations that the force was recalled in 1990, ending India's military engagement with the LTTE.

== Legacy ==
The Lieutenant General F N Billimoria trophy, named after him, is awarded to the best officer in the graduating class of Army Medical Corps Centre & School in the Lucknow Cantonment.

== Personal life ==
He married his wife Yasmin in January 1960 at Secunderabad. They have two sons. Karan Bilimoria (Baron Bilimoria), the British Indian entrepreneur who founded Cobra Beer is his son.

Military offices
Preceded by Mahipat Sinhji	Commandant of the Defence Services Staff College; 1986 - 1987	Succeeded by Gurinder Singh
Preceded by Sunith Francis Rodrigues	General Officer Commanding-in-Chief Central Command; 1989 - 1991	Succeeded by Vijai Singh
