= Army Training Command =

- Insignia of ARTRAC
- Active: 1991 – Present
- Country: India
- Branch: Indian Army
- Type: Command
- Role: Training
- Headquarters: Shimla
- Anniversaries: 1 October (Raising Day)

Commanders
- GOC-in-C: Lieutenant General Shrinjay Pratap Singh
- Notable commanders: Gen Shankar Roy Chowdhury; Gen J. J. Singh; Gen Deepak Kapoor; Gen M. M. Naravane

Insignia
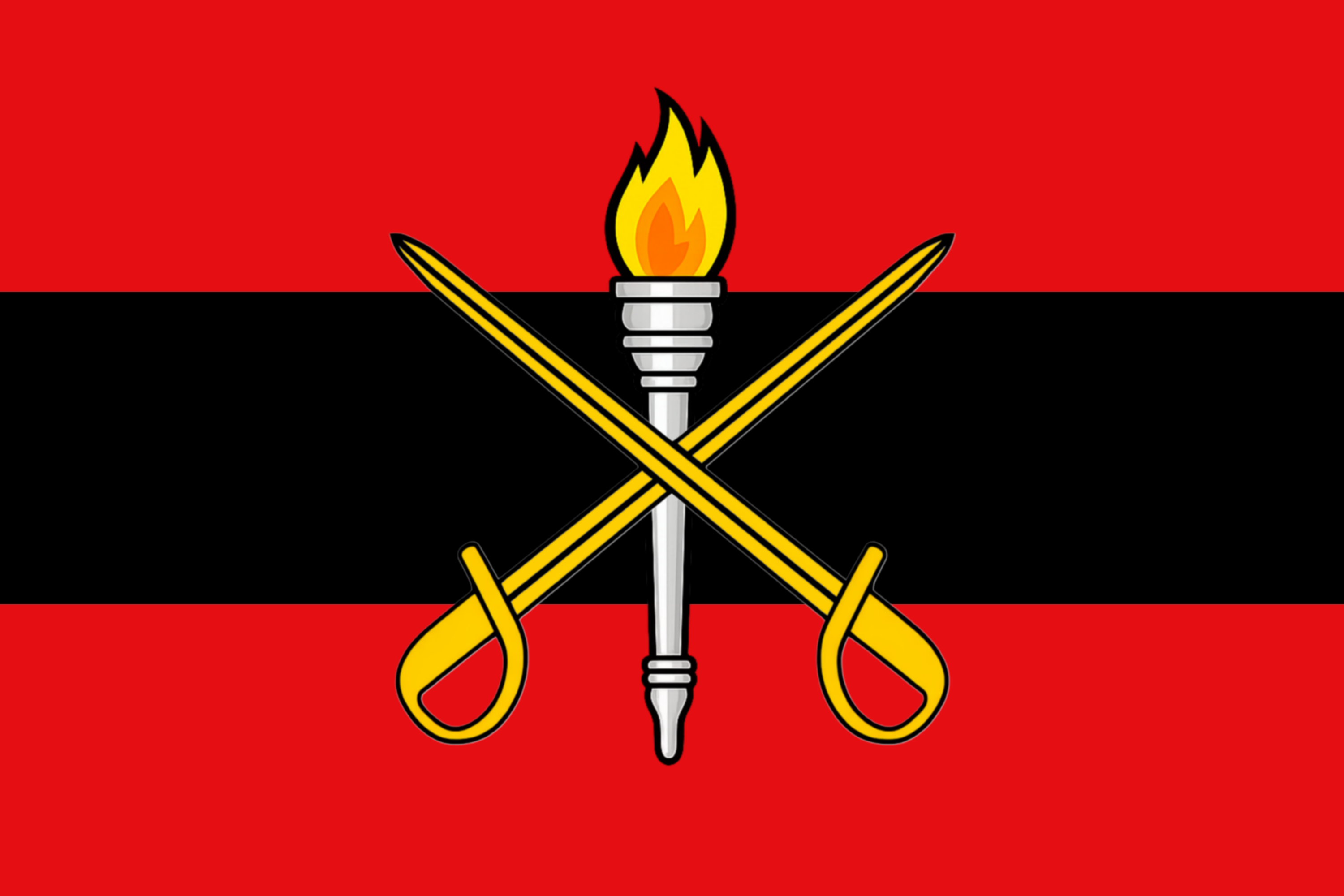
- Flag

The Army Training Command, abbreviated as ARTRAC, is one of the seven commands of the Indian Army. It is currently based at Shimla. It was established on 1 October 1991 at Mhow.

The current ARTRAC Army Commander is Lieutenant General Shrinjay Pratap Singh, who assumed the officer on 1 October 2026.

== History ==
The Army Training Command was established on 1 October 1991 at Mhow in Madhya Pradesh and moved to Shimla on 31 March 1993. The Indian Army has diverse, intensive and variegated Operational responsibilities. Due to constant change in the complexion of the future battlefield combined with rapid technological advances, a need to restructure and streamline our overall training structure was identified. The aim was to maximize effectiveness of our training and establish a dedicated organization for formulating concepts and doctrines, which are specifically applicable to our operational environment. The requirement was to be met by the establishment of a centralized, independent and high-powered organization, with the requisite infrastructure and resources to meet all aspects of concepts and doctrine development, training policies and institutional training.

In 2020, it was decided to merge the Directorate General of Military Training (DGMT) with ARTRAC. DGMT runs the Rashtriya Military Schools (RMS).

== Objectives ==
Its roles are to:

- Formulate concepts and doctrines of warfare in the fields of strategy, operational art, tactics, logistics, training and human resource development stimulating a real-time scenario.
- Acts as the nodal agency for all institutional training in the Army
- Evolve joint doctrines in conjunction with other Services to evolve joint doctrines, fostering tri-service integration for modern warfare scenarios.
- Integrating technology like simulation-based war-gaming into training modules
- Planning, co-ordination, supervision and implementation of training policy and conduct of training courses, at specified training establishments of the Indian Army.
- MoUs & linkages with civ Universities, NCERT, UGC & UPSC wrt examination trends
- Creating policy with respect to Joint training with other services, BMT in Cat ‘B’ establishment.

== List of Army Commanders ==
THe following table chronicles the list of General Officer Commanding-in-Chief, Army Training Command.

S.No	Rank	Name	Portrait	Assumed office	Left office	Unit of Commission	References
1	Lieutenant General	A. S. Kalkat		1 October 1991	31 July 1992	8th Gorkha Rifles	
2	Lieutenant General	Shankar Roychowdhury		1 August 1992	22 November 1994	20th Lancers	
3	Lieutenant General	S. K. Sharma		22 November 1994	31 March 1997	Armoured Corps	
4	Lieutenant General	Vijay Oberoi		1 April 1997	15 October 1999	Maratha Light Infantry	
5	Lieutenant General	H. B. Kala		15 October 1999	1 April 2001	Jat Regiment	
6	Lieutenant General	Shamsher Singh Mehta		1 April 2001	31 October 2002	63rd Cavalry	
7	Lieutenant General	Shantanu Choudhry		1 November 2002	31 December 2002	Regiment of Artillery	
8	Lieutenant General	Joginder Jaswant Singh		1 January 2003	30 January 2004	Maratha Light Infantry	
9	Lieutenant General	Krishnamurthy Nagaraj		1 February 2004	15 August 2005	Maratha Light Infantry	
10	Lieutenant General	Deepak Kapoor		15 August 2005	31 September 2005	Regiment of Artillery	
11	Lieutenant General	K. S. Jamwal		1 October 2005	31 December 2006	Regiment of Artillery	
12	Lieutenant General	M. L. Naidu		1 January 2007	30 September 2007	Rajput Regiment	
13	Lieutenant General	Jayanta Kumar Mohanty		1 October 2007	31 December 2008	Dogra Regiment	
14	Lieutenant General	B. S. Jaswal		1 January 2009	30 September 2009	Jammu and Kashmir Rifles	
15	Lieutenant General	Arvinder Singh Lamba		1 October 2009	1 December 2010	Regiment of Artillery	
16	Lieutenant General	K. Surendra Nath		1 January 2011	30 May 2013	Mechanised Infantry	
17	Lieutenant General	Sanjeev Madhok		1 June 2013	30 July 2015	Brigade of Guards	
18	Lieutenant General	Pattiarimal Mohamadali Hariz		1 August 2015	31 August 2016	Mechanized Infantry	
19	Lieutenant General	Dewan Rabindranth Soni		17 September 2016	30 November 2017	Central India Horse	
20	Lieutenant General	Manoj Mukund Naravane		1 December 2017	30 September 2018	Sikh Light Infantry	
21	Lieutenant General	Pattacheruvanda C. Thimayya		1 November 2018	30 April 2020	Mechanised Infantry Regiment	
22	Lieutenant General	Raj Shukla		1 May 2020	31 March 2022	Regiment of Artillery	
23	Lieutenant General	Surinder Singh Mahal		1 April 2022	30 November 2023	41 Armoured Regiment	
24	Lieutenant General	Manjinder Singh		1 December 2023	30 June 2024	Madras Regiment	
25	Lieutenant General	Devendra Sharma		1 July 2024	31 August 2026	14th Horse (Scinde Horse)	
26	Lieutenant General	Shrinjay Pratap Singh		1 October 2026	Incumbent	Kumaon Regiment	

== Notes ==
1.Later became the Chief of Army Staff.
