= Bal Krishna Karki =

Lieutenant General Bal Krishna Karki
- Allegiance: Nepal
- Branch: Nepal Army
- Service years: 1987–2023
- Rank: Lt. General
- Awards: Suprabal Jana Sewa Shree; Abraham Award for Nature Conservation 2002

Bal Krishna Karki ndc, psc, MA, was a Lieutenant general in the Nepal Army; he was Vice Chief of Army Staff (VCOAS). Prior to joining this post, he previously served as Assistant Chief of Army Staff of Nepal army.

== Career ==
Karki was commissioned from Royal Military Academy, Sandhurst, United Kingdom as second Lieutenant on August 8, 1987. He served as Commandant of Army Command & Staff College, Shivapuri.
