= Mechanised Infantry Regiment =

Mechanised infantry arm of the Indian Army

- Regimental insignia: A rifle bayonet mounted on a BMP-1, depicting the infantry and mechanised facets of the Regiment
- Active: 02 April 1979 - present
- Country: India
- Branch: Indian Army
- Type: Line infantry
- Role: Mechanized Infantry
- Size: 27 battalions
- Regimental centre: Ahilya Nagar, Maharashtra
- Mottos: FAITH & VALOUR
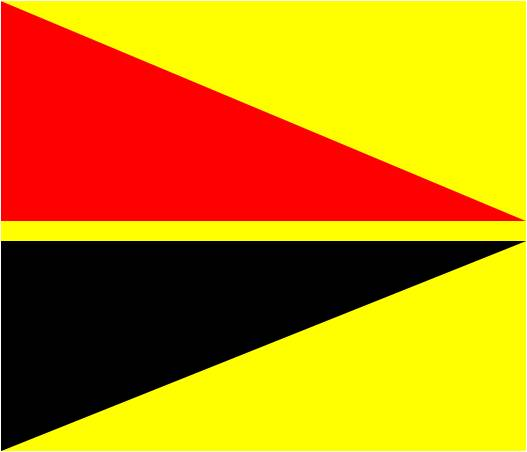
- Regimental flag

Commanders
- Colonel of the Regiment: Lt Gen PS Shekawat

Insignia
- War cry: Bolo Bharat Mata Ki Jai (Victory to Mother India)

The Mechanised Infantry Regiment is an infantry regiment of the Indian Army, comprising 27 battalions (including 3 tracked and 2 wheeled reconnaissance and support battalions) dispersed under various armoured formations throughout India. Together with the 23 battalions of Brigade of the Guards, they form part of the Mechanised Infantry arm, which along with the Armoured Corps form the Mechanised Forces.

== History ==
The Mechanised Infantry Regiment is one of the youngest regiments in the army and was the mastermind of General K Sundarji, who had the foresight to cater to the needs of a modern army. After the Indo-Pakistani War of 1965, a need was felt to give infantry battalions greater mobility, especially when operating with armoured formations. In 1969, 1st Madras became the first infantry unit to be equipped with the armoured personnel carrier (APC) TOPAS. In 1970, nine more of the oldest battalions from various infantry regiments were equipped with APCs, these included TOPAS, SKOT and BTR-60. These battalions remained affiliated with their erstwhile Infantry Regiments and Regimental Centres and did not form a separate regiment. Eventually, fourteen old infantry battalions were mechanised.

During the Indo-Pakistani War of 1971, some of these battalions saw action as part of combat groupings with armoured units for the first time. The APCs were replaced with BMP-1 Infantry Combat Vehicles between 1977 and 1978. The need for something more concrete and viable was felt, along with a need to develop a common battle and training philosophy with regards to the type of tactics. This necessitated the raising a totally new arm in the Indian Army, resulting in the various mechanised battalions being brought together under a single cap badge as the Mechanised Infantry Regiment, which was raised with fourteen battalions on 2 April 1979 and the affairs of the regiment were transferred from Directorate General of Infantry to Armoured Corps Directorate, which was renamed the Directorate General Mechanised Forces in 1986. Gen K Sundarji was appointed the first Colonel of the Mechanised Infantry Regiment, the post he held till his retirement.

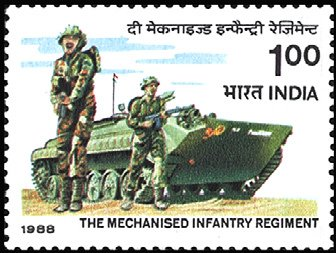
1988 postal stamp

The regiment saw a rapid expansion in the 1980s. Mechanised infantry battalions numbered 15 to 26 have been raised on all-India mixed class composition, unlike the older units, which were single class ones. The only exception was 20 Rajput, which joined the regiment as the 24th battalion in April 1992. The Mechanised Infantry Regiment has been involved in Operation Pawan in Sri Lanka, Operation Rakshak in Punjab and Jammu & Kashmir and Operation Vijay in Jammu & Kashmir. It also took part in UN Peacekeeping Operations in Somalia, Congo, Angola and Sierra Leone.The Regiment is affiliated to the Indian Naval Ship Gharial.

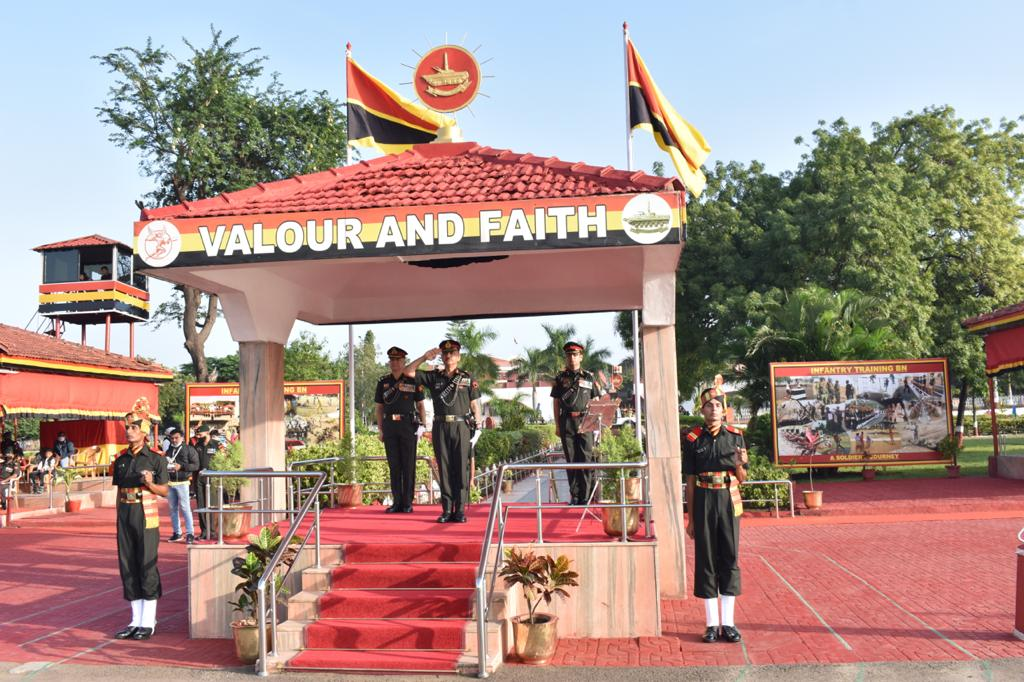
Attestation Parade at The Mechanised Infantry Regimental Centre, Ahmednagar, September 2021. The regimental insignia and flag can be seen in the background.

== Mechanised Infantry Institutions ==
=== Mechanised Infantry Centre and School ===
The Mechanised Infantry Regimental Centre (MIRC) was established on 2 April 1979 at Ahmednagar (now Ahilyanagar) and it is spread over 2179 acres. It trains approximately 950 recruits annually. It has three training battalions: Infantry Training Battalion, Composite Training Battalion and Driving and Maintenance Battalion. It was renamed as the Mechanised Infantry Centre and School (MIC&S) on 17 September 2021. In addition to the troops from the Mechanised Infantry, those from the Brigade of the Guards undergo their 'mechanised' training at the MIC&S. MIC&S offers eight diploma courses and four post graduate diploma courses under the Savitribai Phule Pune University.

=== Quarter Guard ===
The Quarter Guard of the MIRC was created on 9 August 1979 during the first biennial conference. After the sanction of KLP, the present Quarter Guard was conceptualised in half circular area with front wide platform. The new Quarter Guard was completed in 1986. The Quarter Guard has 18 internal rooms as well as an armour shop and a guard room. To the right and left side of the guard are two guns and two cannons that symbolise the strength of soldiers.

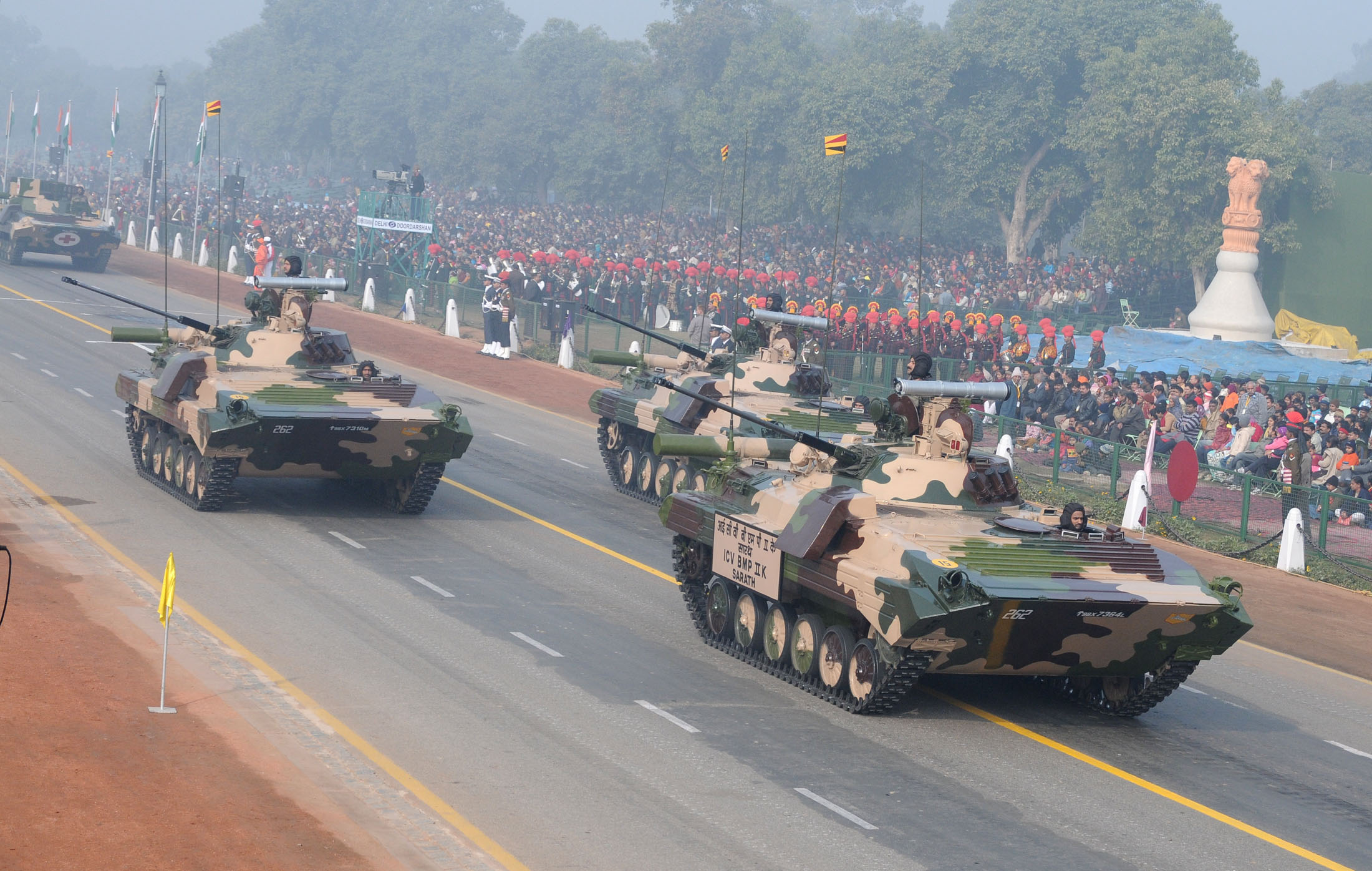
BMP-2 of 12th Battalion, Mechanised Infantry Regiment passes through the Rajpath during the full dress rehearsal for the Republic Day Parade, 2010

=== Military Band ===
The MIRC Band is based at Ahmednagar and serves all regimental duties related to musical support. The band was formed during April 1982 under the auspices of Brigadier Tilak Raj. The band has held the honour of performing at national events such as the Beating Retreat, Army and Republic Day Parades, as well as events at the Rashtrapati Bhavan. It also has performed at the 2007 Military World Games, the 2010 Commonwealth Games, and the 2001 Mumbai International Fleet Review among others.

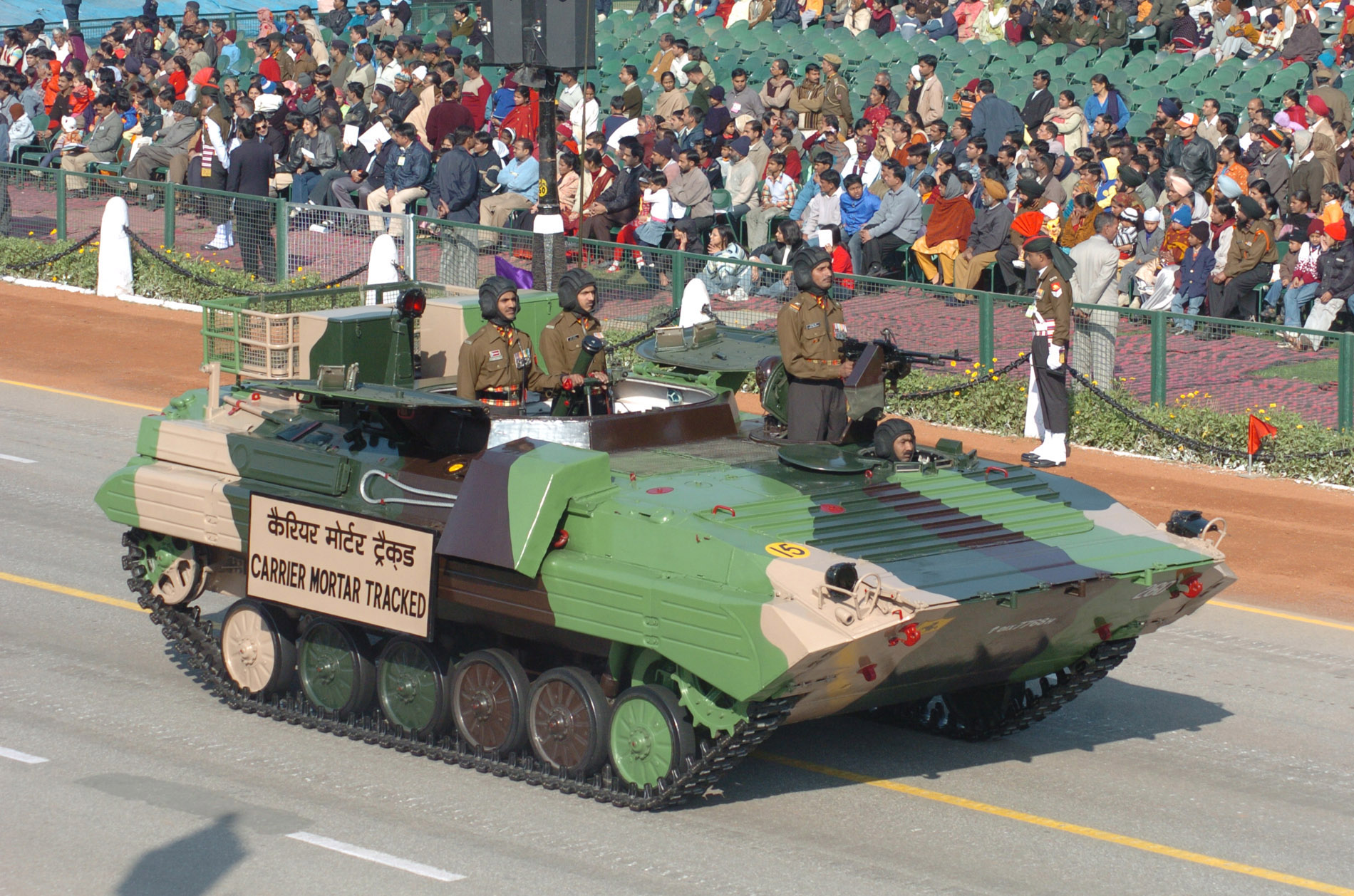
The Carrier Mortar Tracked Vehicle gliding down the Rajpath during the Republic Day Parade, 2006

=== Regimental museum ===
The MIRC Museum was founded and inaugurated on 9 February 2000 by Lieutenant General Pankaj Joshi, the then Colonel of the regiment. The museum is currently housed at the ground floor of Mechanised Bhavan. The museum houses the regimental colour, as well as the history if the MIRC and mementos from Colonels of the regiment.

== Equipment ==
- BMP-2 Infantry Fighting Vehicles
- TATA Kestrel

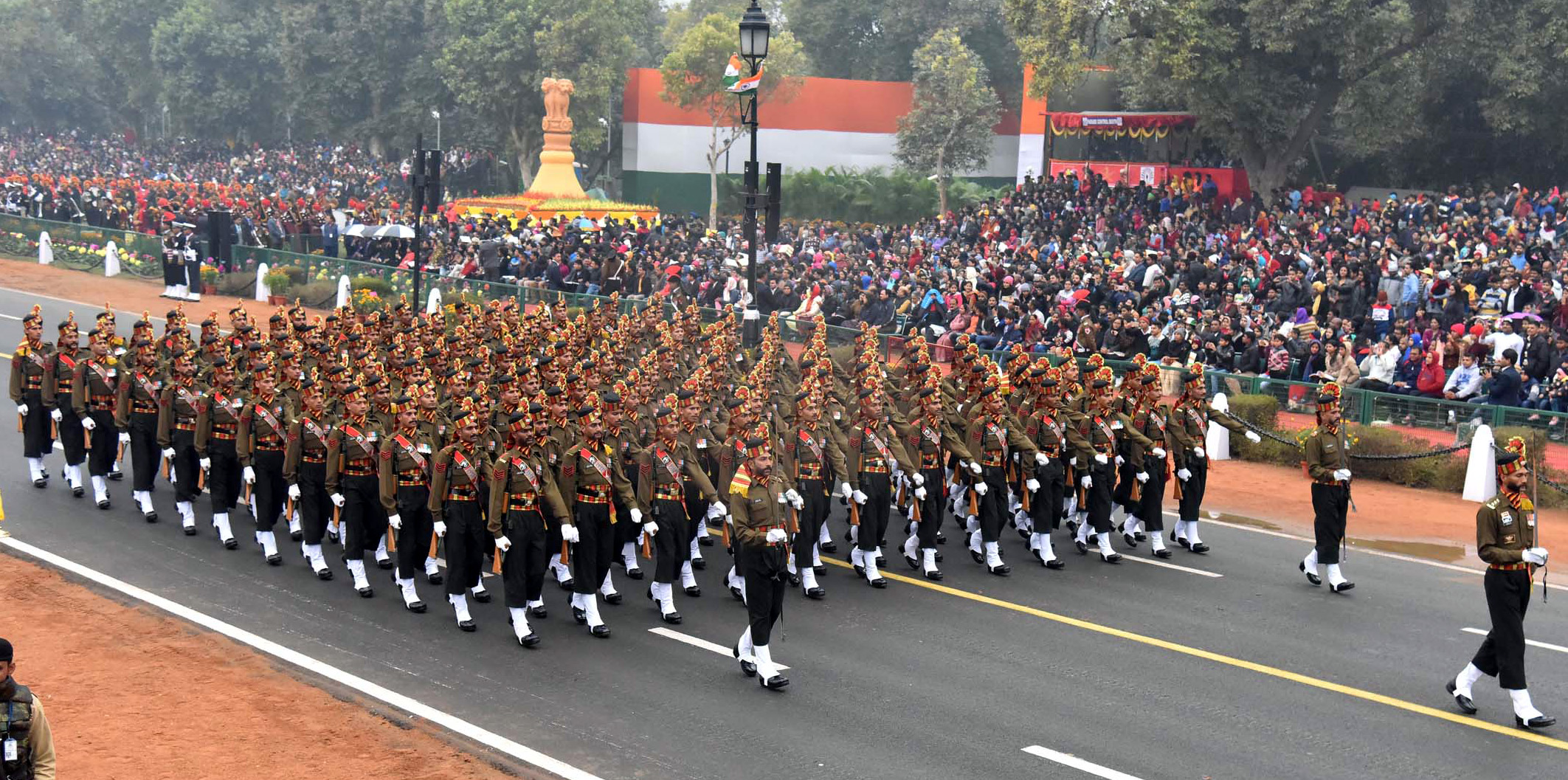
The Mechanised Infantry Marching Contingent passes through the Rajpath, on the occasion of the 68th Republic Day Parade 2017

== Regimental battalions ==
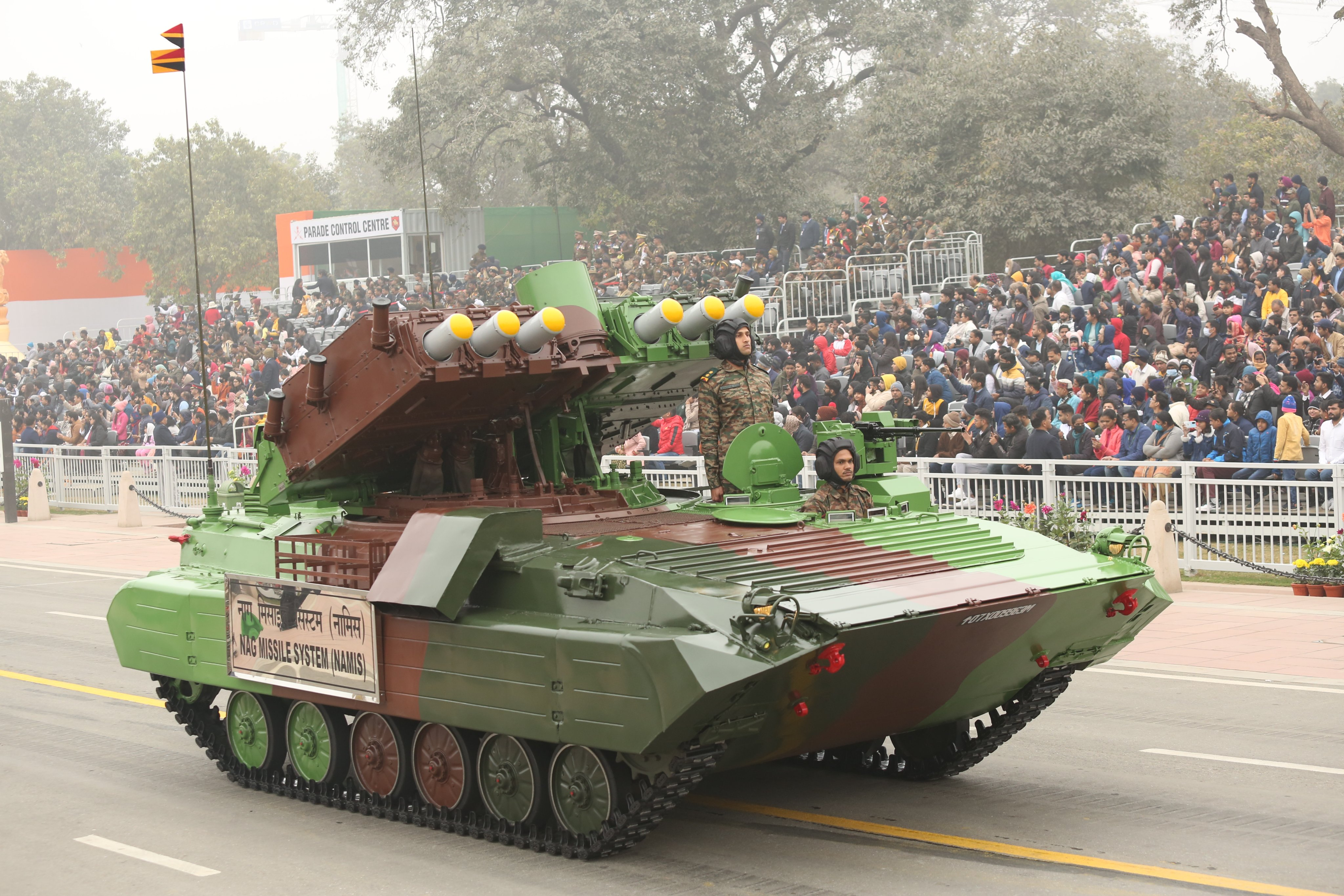
Nag Missile System, (17th Battalion, Mechanised Infantry Regiment), Republic Day Parade, 2023

The Mechanised Infantry Regiment consists of units designated as battalions. Each battalion consists of four companies - Headquarter Company and three Mechanised Companies. In addition, there are platoons - Reconnaissance (recce), Signals, Adm Medium and Light Repair Workshop. The sanctioned strength of a battalion is 805 personnel (26 Officers, 52 JCOs, 6 technical JCOs/CHMs and 721 ORs. The battalions are operational under Armoured Divisions, Armoured Brigades or Independent Mechanised Brigades.

The current battalions are as follows-

Unit	Date of raising	Date of conversion to Mechanised	Former designation(s)	Battle honours	Remarks
1st Battalion	01 Dec 1776	01 Dec 1969	1st Battalion, Madras Regiment	Kalidhar	
2nd Battalion	09 Nov 1803	15 Aug 1970	1st Battalion, Jat Regiment (Light Infantry)	Festubert	
3rd Battalion	19 Feb 1824	14 June 1971	1st Battalion, 8 Gorkha Rifles	Chushul	
4th Battalion	30 Jul 1846	15 May 1970	1st Battalion, Sikh Regiment	Tithwal	
5th Battalion	28 Dec 1852	01 May 1978	4th Gwalior Infantry; 14th Battalion, Kumaon Regiment	OP Hill	
6th Battalion	05 May 1887	15 Jun 1970	1st Battalion, Garhwal Rifles	Gadra City	
7th Battalion	30 May 1887	15 Apr 1970	37th Dogras; 1st Battalion, Dogra Regiment	Asal Uttar	
8th Battalion	05 May 1941	11 Aug 1971	7th Battalion, 2nd Punjab Regiment; 7th Battalion, Punjab Regiment	Ichhogil	First unit to be equipped with BMP-1
9th Battalion	01 Apr 1949	11 Aug 1971	7th Battalion, The Grenadiers	Chhadbet	
10th Battalion	27 May 1949	11 Aug 1971	20th Battalion, Maratha Light Infantry	Bejai	
11th Battalion	11 Feb 1953	11 Aug 1971	18th Battalion, Rajputana Rifles	Basantar River	
12th Battalion	01 Jan 1965	16 Nov 1975	8th Battalion, Parachute Regiment; 16th Battalion, Mahar Regiment		
13th Battalion	01 Jan 1965	02 Apr 1981	18th Battalion, Rajput Regiment	Akhaura	
14th Battalion	01 Sep 1976	16 Jan 1981	16th Battalion, Jammu & Kashmir Rifles		
15th Battalion	15 Dec 1981				First battalion to be raised directly as Mechanised Infantry
16th Battalion	01 Jan 1982				
17th Battalion	15 Nov 1982				Reconnaissance & Support (Tracked)
18th Battalion	01 Mar 1983				
19th Battalion	15 Sep 1983				Reconnaissance & Support (Tracked)
20th Battalion	01 Mar 1984				
21st Battalion	01 Mar 1984				
22nd Battalion	01 Mar 1984				
23rd Battalion	11 Feb 1985				Reconnaissance & Support (Wheeled)
24th Battalion	26 Jan 1954	05 Dec 1971	20th Battalion, Rajput Regiment	Khinsar	Reconnaissance & Support (Tracked) (Note: The unit claims to trace its origins to 1212 CE, it was later part of the Indian State Forces, joined the Indian Army in April 1951 and was designated part of the Rajput Regiment in January 1954.)
25th Battalion	25 Jun 1994				Reconnaissance & Support (Wheeled)
26th Battalion	? 2015				
27th Battalion	17 Jul 2017				

== Gallantry awards ==
The regiment has won the following gallantry awards since its establishment in 1979 -

- Maha Vir Chakra - 1
  - Major Rajesh Singh Adhikari - 2 Mech Inf attached to 18 Grenadiers
- Kirti Chakra - 2
  - Captain Hardev Singh
  - Sepoy Daya Shankar - 14 RR
- Uttam Yudh Seva Medal - 2
- Vir Chakra - 1
  - Second Lieutenant Satish Kumar Prabhakaran Menon - 15 Mech Inf
- Shaurya Chakra - 19
- Yudh Seva Medal - 4
- Sena Medal - 87

== Notable Officers ==
- Lieutenant General K Surendra Nath PVSM, AVSM, VSM - GOC-in-C Army Training Command, 2011-13
- Lieutenant General Philip Campose AVSM, VSM - GOC-in-C Western Command, 2013-14 and Vice Chief of the Army Staff, 2014-15
- Lieutenant General PM Hariz PVSM, AVSM, SM, VSM - GOC-in-C Army Training Command, 2015-16 and GOC-in-C Southern Command, 2016-17
- Lieutenant General PC Thimayya PVSM, VSM - GOC-in-C Army Training Command, 2018-20
- Lieutenant General Ravendra Pal Singh PVSM, AVSM, VSM - GOC-in-C Western Command, 2019-21

== See also ==
- List of regiments of the Indian Army

== External Media ==
- Indian Army Mechanised Infantry describing the weapons, vehicle and soldiers
- Images of the Mechanised Infantry showing the combat vehicles.
