= Uttarkashi Assembly constituency =

Former constituency of the Uttarakhand Assembly, in India

Coordinates: 30.73°N 78.43°E

Uttarkashi
- Former constituency for the Uttarakhand Legislative Assembly

Constituency details
- Country: India
- Region: North India
- State: Uttarakhand
- District: Uttarkashi
- Established: 1974
- Abolished: 2002
- Reservation: SC

Uttarkashi was a part of the Uttar Pradesh Legislative Assembly from 1974 to 2000. It became a part of the Interim Uttaranchal Assembly from 2000 to 2002.

== Members of the Legislative Assembly ==
Key INC SP Independent JP JD BJP

Election	Member	Party
1974	Baldev Singh Arya	Indian National Congress
1977	Barfia Lal Juwantha	Janata Party
1980	Baldev Singh Arya	Independent
1985	Baldev Singh Arya	Indian National Congress
1989	Barfia Lal Junwantha	Janata Dal
1991	Gyan Chand	Bharatiya Janata Party
1993	Barfia Lal Junwantha	Samajwadi Party
1996	Gyan Chand	Bharatiya Janata Party
Formation of Uttarakhand State; Major boundary changes
This Assembly constituency has been bifurcated into Gangotri, Purola and Yamunotri Assembly constituencies

== See also ==
- Gangotri (Uttarakhand Assembly constituency)
- Purola (Uttarakhand Assembly constituency)
- Yamunotri (Uttarakhand Assembly constituency)
