= General officer commanding =

Army title in the United Kingdom and Commonwealth countries

General officer commanding (GOC) is the usual title given in the armies of the United Kingdom and other Commonwealth countries (and some other nations, such as Ireland) to a general officer who holds a command appointment.

Thus, a general might be the GOC British II Corps (a three-star appointment) or GOC British 7th Armoured Division (a two-star appointment).

== GOC-in-C ==
A general officer heading a particularly large or important command, such as the commander of an army group or a large army, may be titled a general officer commanding-in-chief (GOC-in-C). In the British Army, this appointment is typically held by a lieutenant general or higher rank, with GOCs of corps-level formations reporting to them.

== Usage in the Indian Army ==
The army commanders who head the training and operational commands of the Indian Army hold the title of general officer commanding-in-chief (GOC-in-C). There are currently seven appointments:

- General Officer Commanding-in-Chief Central Command
- General Officer Commanding-in-Chief Eastern Command
- General Officer Commanding-in-Chief Northern Command
- General Officer Commanding-in-Chief Southern Command
- General Officer Commanding-in-Chief South Western Command
- General Officer Commanding-in-Chief Western Command
- General Officer Commanding-in-Chief Army Training Command

Higher military commanders of the Indian Army who are in command of operational formations, such as a division or corps, or of static formations, such as a subarea or area, are referred to as general officers commanding; examples being GOC 12 Corps, GOC 3 Infantry Division, GOC Dakshin Maharashtra and Goa Subarea, and GOC Uttar Bharat Area.

== Equivalent term in other services ==
The equivalent term for naval officers is flag officer commanding and that for air force officers is air officer commanding. In the case of flag and air officers heading a large or important command, the term is flag officer commanding-in-chief and air officer commanding-in-chief.

In the United States Armed Forces, the equivalent is commanding general.
