= Gurpal Singh Sangha =

Lieutenant General Gurpal Singh Sangha AVSM, SM, VSM
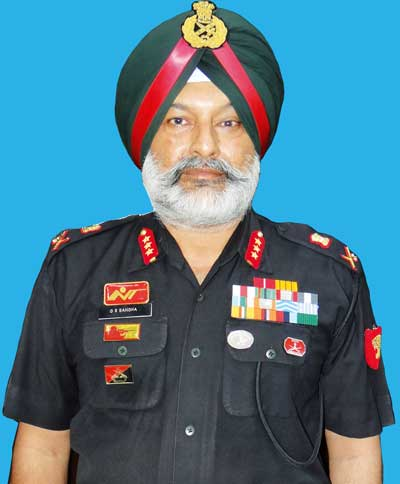
- Military career
- Allegiance: India
- Branch: Indian Army
- Service years: 1981 - 31 JULY 2020
- Rank: Lieutenant General
- Service number: IC-39956
- Unit: 11 Grenadiers
- Commands: IV Corps; 27 Mountain Division; 29 Rashtriya Rifles
- Awards: Ati Vishisht Seva Medal; Sena Medal; Vishisht Seva Medal

Lieutenant General Gurpal Singh Sangha, AVSM, SM, VSM is a former Chief of Staff Western Command of the Indian Army and assumed office on 30 December 2018. He assumed the post from Lt General Amarjeet Singh Bedi. He retired from his position on July 31, 2020.

== Career ==
He was commissioned into 11 Grenadiers in 1981. He has extensive operational experience and has held numerous commands including counter-insurgency operations in Punjab and Jammu and Kashmir as a company and brigade commander; 27 Mountain Division (Kalimpong); and GOC of Bengal area. He has also served at Warminster, Wiltshire, United Kingdom as an Indian Army Liaison officer.

During his career, he has been awarded the Vishisht Seva Medal for his contributions in sports for shooting, the Sena Medal (Distinguished) in 2006 for successful counter-insurgency operations and the Ati Vishisht Seva Medal in 2019.

== Honours and decorations ==

Ati Vishisht Seva Medal	Sena Medal		Vishisht Seva Medal
Wound Medal	Samanya Seva Medal	Special Service Medal	Siachen Glacier Medal
Operation Parakram Medal	Sainya Seva Medal	High Altitude Service Medal	Videsh Seva Medal
50th Anniversary of Independence Medal	30 Years Long Service Medal	20 Years Long Service Medal	9 Years Long Service Medal

== Personal life ==
He has excelled in sports and has won various medals for shooting.

Military offices
Preceded by Amarjeet Singh Bedi	General Officer Commanding IV Corps; 29 December 2017 - 30 December 2018	Succeeded by Manoj Pande
Preceded by Giri Raj Singh	General Officer Commanding Bengal Area; 23 May 2017 - 28 December 2017	Succeeded by
Preceded by	General Officer Commanding 27 Mountain Division; 2014 - 2015	Succeeded by
