= Himayun Muzzammil Bhat =

Recipient of the Kirti Chakra

Himayun Muzammil Bhat KC
- Born: Jammu and Kashmir, India
- Died: 13 September 2023; Anantanag district, Jammu and Kashmir, India
- Cause of death: KIA
- Citizenship: India
- Occupation: Police officer
- Awards: Kirti Chakra

Himayun Muzammil Bhat, KC was an officer of the Jammu and Kashmir Police who served as a Deputy Superintendent of Police . He was killed in action during an anti-terrorist operation in Anantnag district in 2023. For his bravery and sacrifice, he was posthumously awarded India's second highest peacetime gallantry award, the Kirti Chakra.

== Early life and education ==
Bhat was born in Jammu and Kashmir, India. He belonged to a family with a background in public service; his father, Ghulam Hassan Bhat, IPS served as a Inspector General of Police in the Jammu and Kashmir Police. Himayun completed his education in Kashmir and later joined the Jammu and Kashmir Police service through Jammu and Kashmir Public Service Commission.

== Police career ==
Bhat joined the Jammu and Kashmir Police as a Deputy Superintendent of Police. During his service, he was involved in several counter-insurgency and anti-terror operations in the Kashmir Valley. He was known among colleagues for his leadership in field operations and dedication to maintaining law and order in conflict-affected areas of Jammu and Kashmir.

== Anantnag encounter ==
On 13 September 2023, DSP Humayun Bhat was part of a joint anti-terror operation conducted by the Rashtriya Rifles of the Indian Army and the Jammu and Kashmir Police in the Kokernag forest area of Anantnag district. During the encounter with militants, Bhat sustained critical injuries and later succumbed to them. Two senior Indian Army officers, Colonel Manpreet Singh and Major Ashish Dhonchak, SM were also killed in the same operation.

== Awards and honours ==
For displaying exceptional courage and leadership during the operation, the Government of India posthumously awarded Humayun Bhat the Kirti Chakra, one of India's highest peacetime gallantry awards.

== Legacy ==
Humayun Bhat's sacrifice was widely acknowledged across India. His bravery was commemorated by the Jammu and Kashmir Police and other security forces. He is remembered as a symbol of courage and dedication in the fight against terrorism in Jammu and Kashmir.

== See also ==
- Shaurya Chakra
- Jammu and Kashmir Police
- Anantnag district
