= Sarath Chand =

Former Vice Chief of Army Staff

Lieutenant General Sarath Chand PVSM, UYSM, AVSM, VSM
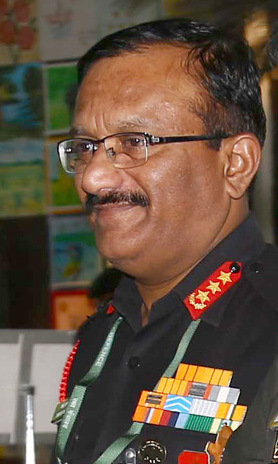

38th Vice Chief of the Army Staff
- In office 13 January 2017 – 31 May 2018
- Chief of Army Staff: Bipin Rawat
- Preceded by: Bipin Rawat
- Succeeded by: Devraj Anbu

General Officer Commanding-in-Chief South Western Command
- In office 1 February 2016 – 12 January 2017
- Preceded by: Arun K Sahni
- Succeeded by: Abhay Krishna

Personal details
- Born: Neduvathoor, Kottarakkara, Kerala
- Spouse: Bindu

Military service
- Allegiance: India
- Branch/service: Indian Army
- Years of service: June 1979 – 31 May 2018
- Rank: Lieutenant General
- Unit: 11 Garhwal Rifles
- Commands: South Western Command; IV Corps; 11 Garhwal Rifles
- Battles/wars: Operation Pawan; Operation Rhino; Operation Falcon
- Service number: IC-35904Y
- Awards: Param Vishisht Seva Medal; Uttam Yudh Seva Medal; Ati Vishisht Seva Medal; Vishisht Seva Medal

Lieutenant General Sarath Chand, PVSM, UYSM, AVSM, VSM is an Indian politician and former Vice Chief of Army Staff (VCOAS) of the Indian Army. He served as Vice Chief of Army Staff from 13 January 2017 till his retirement on 31 May 2018. He joined Bharatiya Janata Party on 6 April 2019.

== Early life and education ==
Chand was born in Kottarakkara, Kerala and is the son of late N. Prabhakaran Nair and G. Saradamma. He is an alumnus of Devi Vilasam Upper Primary School, Neduvathoor; Sainik School, Kazhakootam, National Defence Academy, Pune and Indian Military Academy, Dehradun. He also attended Defence Services Staff College, Wellington; higher command course at Army War College, Mhow and a National Defence College, New Delhi.

== Military career ==
Chand was commissioned into 11th Battalion the Garhwal Rifles in June 1979. He has vast experience spanning over 38 years and has served in all operational theatres and held active combat leadership role at every stage of command. He has commanded a company in the Kargil Sector of Ladakh and another company during Operation Pawan as part of the Indian Peace Keeping Force (IPKF) in Sri Lanka. He has also commanded a battalion in Operation Rhino, targeted at infiltrators in Assam and Operation Falcon, along the Line of Actual control (LAC) in Arunachal Pradesh; an infantry brigade in the desert, a counter-insurgency force in the Kashmir valley, IV Corps (Tezpur) and GOC-C South Western Command (Jaipur). In addition, he has held numerous staff and instructional appointments including instructor of the commando wing in infantry school . He was also served in the United Nations mission in Somalia (UNOSOM-II). He has also served as Colonel of the Regiment of Garhwal Rifles.

He assumed the office of VCOAS on 13 January 2017 after General Bipin Rawat was promoted to Chief of Army Staff (COAS). and retired on 31 May 2018, succeeded by Lt General Devraj Anbu.

During 38 years of his career he has been awarded the Vishisht Seva Medal in 2006, the Ati Vishisht Seva Medal in 2014, the Uttam Yudh Seva Medal in 2016 and the Param Vishisht Seva Medal in 2018.

== Honours and decorations ==

	Param Vishisht Seva Medal	Uttam Yudh Seva Medal	
Ati Vishisht Seva Medal	Vishisht Seva Medal	Special Service Medal	Siachen Glacier Medal
Sainya Seva Medal	High Altitude Service Medal	Videsh Seva Medal	50th Anniversary of Independence Medal
30 Years Long Service Medal	20 Years Long Service Medal	9 Years Long Service Medal	UNOSOM II

== Dates of rank ==
Insignia	Rank	Component	Date of rank
	Second Lieutenant	Indian Army	9 June 1979
	Lieutenant	Indian Army	9 June 1981
	Captain	Indian Army	31 July 1984
	Major	Indian Army	9 June 1990
	Lieutenant-Colonel	Indian Army	1 January 2000
	Colonel	Indian Army	31 October 2004
	Brigadier	Indian Army	8 April 2008 (seniority from 6 July 2007)
	Major General	Indian Army	30 April 2012 (seniority from 4 October 2010)
	Lieutenant-General	Indian Army	28 October 2014

== Personal life ==
He is married to Bindu and they have two sons; Abhilash Chand, a major in the Indian Army Corps of Engineers and Abhijit Chand, a former naval lieutenant.

Military offices
Preceded by Arun Kumar Sahni	General Officer-Commanding-in-Chief South Western Command; 1 February 2016 – 12 January 2017	Succeeded by Abhay Krishna
Preceded by	General Officer Commanding IV Corps	Succeeded by
Preceded by Bipin Rawat	Vice Chief of Army Staff; 13 January 2017 – 31 May 2018	Succeeded by Devraj Anbu
