= XII Corps (India) =

Military field formation of the Indian Army

- Indian Army XII Corps Formation Sign
- Active: 1987–Present
- Country: India
- Branch: Indian Army
- Role: Holding Corps
- Size: Corps
- Part of: Southern Command
- Garrison/HQ: Jodhpur
- Nickname: Konark Corps (Desert Corps)

Commanders
- Current commander: Lt Gen Aditya Vikram Singh Rathee, AVSM SM VSM
- Notable commanders: Lt Gen A K Chatterjee; Lt Gen Philip Campose; Lt Gen Man Mohan Singh Rai; Lt Gen Podali Shankar Rajeshwar

The XII Corps, or the Konark Corps/Desert Corps, is a corps of the Indian Army and one of the two corps of the Pune-based Southern Command.

== Formation ==
With two combat divisions on the order of battle of Southern Command and increasing operational importance of the desert sector, by January 1987, a Corps Headquarters was sanctioned. HQ 12 Corps was raised at Jodhpur during the volatile days of Operation Trident. The corps, which came into existence on the auspicious day of Maha Shivaratri on February 26, 1987 is charged with protection of the desert sectors of the country falling in Rajasthan and Gujarat states and was raised under Lieutenant General A K Chatterjee as the first General Officer Commanding (GOC). Also referred to as Desert Corps within the army, the corps adopted Konark as its formation insignia after the Konark Sun Temple of Puri as a symbolic representation of the radiation of the sun in eight cardinal directions, thereby establishing a spiritual link with the Sun City - Jodhpur.

== Order of battle ==
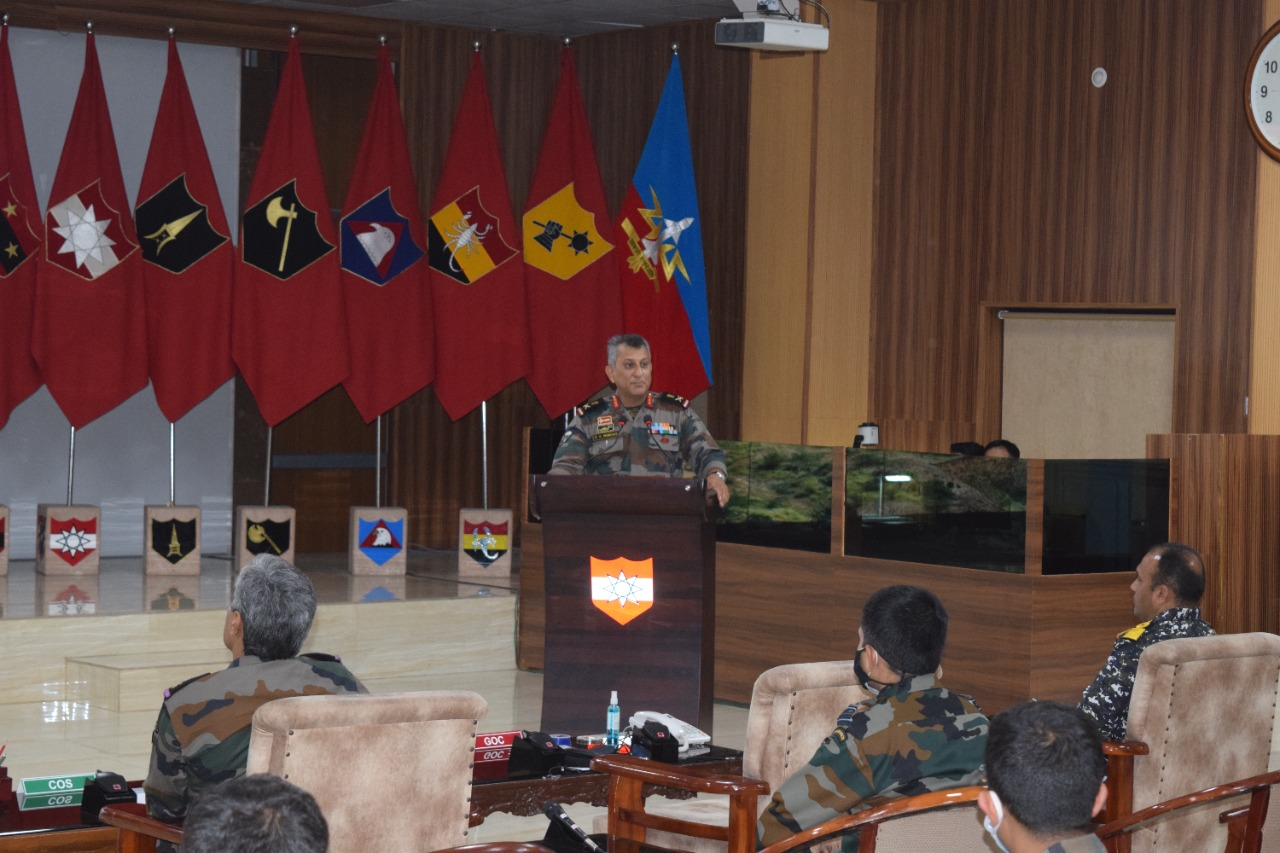
Lieutenant General PS Minhas, GOC Konark Corps addressing Officers of 77th DSSC Course at Jodhpur Military Station, 26 September 2021. The formation signs of the corps, divisions and brigades can be seen in the background.

XII corps currently consists of:

- 11 Infantry Division (Golden Katar Division) headquartered at Ahmedabad, Gujarat
- 12 Infantry Division (Battle Axe Division) headquartered at Jaisalmer, Rajasthan.
  - 140 Armoured Brigade (includes at least 2 regiments equipped with Arjun Mk 1 MBT)
- 75 (Independent) Infantry Brigade (Bald Eagle Brigade) at Bhuj, Gujarat.
- 4 (Independent) Armoured Brigade (Black Mace Brigade)
- 340 (Independent) Mechanised Brigade (former 34th Independent Infantry Brigade) (Amphibious)
- 2 Bhairav Battalion (Desert Falcon)

== Humanitarian assistance ==
The corps has been intimately involved in providing succor to citizens of India in times of natural calamities such as earthquakes and floods most noteworthy being Bhuj earthquake, floods in Rajasthan and Gujarat.

== List of General Officer Commanding ==
Rank	Name	Appointment Date	Left office	Unit of Commission	References
Lieutenant General	AK Chatterjee	February 1987	February 1988	Sikh Light Infantry	
Lieutenant General	R Narasimhan	April 1988	May 1990	Jat Regiment	
Lieutenant General	YN Sharma	May 1990	February 1992	The Grenadiers	
Lieutenant General	Moti Dar	March 1992	December 1992	17th Horse (Poona Horse)	
Lieutenant General	HM Khanna	January 1994	August 1996	4th Gorkha Rifles	
Lieutenant General	PS Joshi	September 1996	January 1999	8th Gorkha Rifles	
Lieutenant General	MA Gurbaxani	January 1999	March 2001	Rajput Regiment	
Lieutenant General	Hari Prasad	March 2001	August 2002	Maratha Light Infantry	
Lieutenant General	Ram Subramanyam	August 2002	December 2003	Corps of Engineers	
Lieutenant General	KS Jamwal	December 2003	April 2005	Regiment of Artillery	
Lieutenant General	PR Gangadharan	April 2006	September 2006	Maratha Light Infantry	
Lieutenant General	SPS Dhillon	September 2006	January 2008	Regiment of Artillery	
Lieutenant General	SN Handa	January 2008	December 2008	3rd Gorkha Rifles	
Lieutenant General	AM Verma	December 2008	February 2010	Rajput Regiment	
Lieutenant General	Narendra Singh	February 2010	June 2011	Maratha Light Infantry	
Lieutenant General	Philip Campose	3 July 2011	August 2012	Mechanised Infantry Regiment	
Lieutenant General	Man Mohan Singh Rai	August 2012	August 2013	Bombay Sappers	
Lieutenant General	GS Katoch	August 2013	1 September 2014	Jammu and Kashmir Rifles	
Lieutenant General	Bobby Mathews	1 September 2014	10 October 2015	Kumaon Regiment	
Lieutenant General	VP Singh	October 2015	November 2016	Jammu and Kashmir Light Infantry	
Lieutenant General	Podali Shankar Rajeshwar	November 2016	November 2017	Regiment of Artillery	
Lieutenant General	Rajni Kant Jagga	November 2017	November 2018	1st Horse (Skinner's Horse)	
Lieutenant General	VS Sreenivas	19 November 2018	10 February 2020	The Garhwal Rifles	
Lieutenant General	Anil Puri	11 February 2020	13 February 2021	Corps of Engineers	
Lieutenant General	PS Minhas	14 February 2021	06 March 2022	Central India Horse	
Lieutenant General	Rakesh Kapoor	07 March 2022	08 June 2023	63rd Cavalry	
Lieutenant General	Mohit Malhotra	09 June 2023	16 June 2025	47th Armoured Regiment	
Lieutenant General	Aditya Vikram Singh Rathee	16 June 2025	Incumbent	Brigade of the Guards	
