= IV Corps (India) =

Military field formation of the Indian Army

- Indian Army IV Corps Formation Sign
- Active: Jan 1942 - November 1945; October 1962 – present
- Country: India
- Branch: Indian Army
- Role: Mountain (Holding) Corps
- Size: Corps
- Part of: Eastern Command
- Garrison/HQ: Tezpur
- Nickname: Gajraj Corps

Commanders
- Current commander: Lt Gen Neeraj Shukla, AVSM, SM**
- Notable commanders: Field Marshal Sam Manekshaw; Lt Gen Sagat Singh; General Arun Shridhar Vaidya; General Nirmal Chander Vij; Lt Gen Kaiwalya Trivikram Parnaik; Lt Gen Sarath Chand; Lt Gen Devraj Anbu; General Manoj Pande

The IV Corps, or the Gajraj Corps, is a corps of the Indian Army headquartered in Tezpur, Assam. The corps was raised in 1942 for the defence of Assam and was demobilised in 1945. It was re-raised in October 1962 just before the Sino-Indian War.

== History ==
The British IV Corps, under the command of Lieutenant-General Noel Irwin, was deployed from the Middle East in January 1942, for the defense of Assam from the advancing Japanese during the Second World War. Following the end of the war, the corps was demobilised in November 1945.

The corps was re-raised by Lieutenant General Brij Mohan Kaul at Tezpur, Assam on 4 October 1962, close to the Sino-Indian War. Over the years, it has played a role in both conventional and counter-insurgency operations in the eastern theatre, especially during the 1971 war in Bangladesh.

During the Indo-Pakistani War of 1971, the Gajraj Corps made the famous advance to Dhaka during the liberation of Bangladesh and also participated in the Meghna Heli Bridge Operations. Lieutenant General Sagat Singh, PVSM had innovatively employed Mi-4 helicopters to cross Meghna River, which was considered impassable and his Corps relentlessly attacked and defeated the Pakistani forces. The innovative use of helicopters has remained unparalleled. The Corps had proved its mettle and very proficiently carried out its task in the most complex sector in terms of distances from the logistic bases.

The corps has been active in counter-insurgency roles as part of Operation Bajrang (from November 1990), Operation Rhino I (from September 1991) and Operation Rhino II (from April 1992).

The engineers and troops of the Gajraj Corps developed an indigenous High Altitude Monorail System in the Kameng Himalayas in Arunachal Pradesh. The monorail, with a capacity of over 300 kg (660 lb) in a single run, has been operational at an altitude of 16,000 ft (4,900 m) since November 2025. The system can operate in day-night as well as adverse weather conditions to transport logistics (including rations, ammunition, fuel and engineering stores) and casualty evacuation.

== Composition ==
It currently consists of:

- 71 Mountain Division, headquartered at Missamari.
- 5th Mountain Division (Ball of Fire Division), headquartered at Rupa near Bomdila. The division was converted to a mountain division in 1963. It is posted to the west of 2 Mountain Division in Arunachal Pradesh.
- 21st Mountain Division (Red Horn Division), headquartered at Rangia

== List of General Officers Commanding ==
For the list of GOCs between 1942 and 1945 - List of GOCs 1942-45

Rank	Name	Appointment Date	Left office	Unit of Commission	References
Lieutenant General	Brij Mohan Kaul	4 October 1962	2 December 1962	Rajputana Rifles	(Note: Lieutenant General Harbaksh Singh took over command of 4 Corps for a few days, when Lieutenant General B M Kaul had fallen sick.)
Lieutenant General	SHFJ Manekshaw	2 December 1962	4 December 1963	8th Gorkha Rifles	
Lieutenant General	Manmohan Khanna	5 December 1963		Kumaon Regiment	
Lieutenant General	Sagat Singh	December 1970		3rd Gorkha Rifles	
Lieutenant General	Stanley Leslie Menezes		31 May 1978	The Grenadiers	
Lieutenant General	Arun Shridhar Vaidya	1 July 1980		9th Deccan Horse	
Lieutenant General	N S Narahari	1986		Bombay Sappers	
Lieutenant General	Ajai Singh	1990	1992	17th Horse (Poona Horse)	
Lieutenant General	NK Kapur	1994		Rajput Regiment	
Lieutenant General	Baldev Singh	1995		4th Gorkha Rifles	
Lieutenant General	Nirmal Chander Vij	1997		Dogra Regiment	
Lieutenant General	R K Sawhney		31 December 1997	Jammu and Kashmir Rifles	
Lieutenant General	D B Shekatkar	1999	2000	Maratha Light Infantry	
Lieutenant General	Mahesh Vij	June 2000		Mechanised Infantry Regiment	
Lieutenant General	Mohinder Singh		February 2004	Punjab Regiment	
Lieutenant General	Anup Singh Jamwal	February 2004	March 2005	Regiment of Artillery	
Lieutenant General	Hardev Singh Lidder	March 2005	March 2006	Parachute Regiment	
Lieutenant General	Ranbir K Chhabra	March 2006	August 2007	4th Gorkha Rifles	
Lieutenant General	B S Jaswal	August 2007		Jammu and Kashmir Rifles	
Lieutenant General	Kaiwalya Trivikram Parnaik	2009	2010	Rajputana Rifles	
Lieutenant General	Gyan Bhushan	March 2010	29 June 2011	Mahar Regiment	
Lieutenant General	Shakti Gurung	30 June 2011	15 August 2012	The Grenadiers	
Lieutenant General	Changali Ananda Krishnan	16 August 2012	19 August 2013	4th Gorkha Rifles	
Lieutenant General	Anil Kumar Ahuja	20 August 2013	27 October 2014	Regiment of Artillery	
Lieutenant General	Sarath Chand	28 October 2014	16 November 2015	Garhwal Rifles	
Lieutenant General	Devraj Anbu	17 November 2015	24 December 2016	Sikh Light Infantry	
Lieutenant General	Amarjeet Singh Bedi	25 November 2016	28 December 2017	Garhwal Rifles	
Lieutenant General	Gurpal Singh Sangha	29 December 2017	30 December 2018	The Grenadiers	
Lieutenant General	Manoj Pande	30 December 2018	May 2019	Bombay Sappers	
Lieutenant General	Santanu Dayal	May 2019	26 January 2021	Garhwal Rifles	
Lieutenant General	Ravin Khosla	26 January 2021	21 March 2022	5th Gorkha Rifles (Frontier Force)	
Lieutenant General	Dinesh Singh Rana	21 March 2022	28 March 2023	Garhwal Rifles	
Lieutenant General	Manish Erry	28 March 2023	31 July 2024	Jammu and Kashmir Light Infantry	
Lieutenant General	Gambhir Singh	01 August 2024	31 Mar 2026	Garhwal Rifles	
Lieutenant General	Neeraj Shukla	01 April 2026	Incumbent	Jammu and Kashmir Rifles	

== See also ==
- I Corps (India)
- II Corps (India)
- III Corps (India)
