= General Mathews =

General Mathews or Matthews may refer to:

- Bobby Mathews (general) (fl. 1970s–2020s), Indian Army lieutenant general
- Bruce Matthews (Canadian Army officer) (1909–1991), Canadian Army major general
- Francis Matthews (British Army officer) (1903–1976), British Army major general
- George Mathews (Georgia politician) (1739–1812), Continental Army brevet brigadier general
- Joane Mathews (fl. 1980s–2020s), Wisconsin Army National Guard brigadier general
- Richard Matthews (soldier) (died 1783), British East India Company general in the Second Anglo-Mysore War

== See also ==
- Attorney General Mathews (disambiguation)
