= Devraj Anbu =

Indian Army general

Lieutenant General Devraj Anbu PVSM UYSM AVSM YSM SM
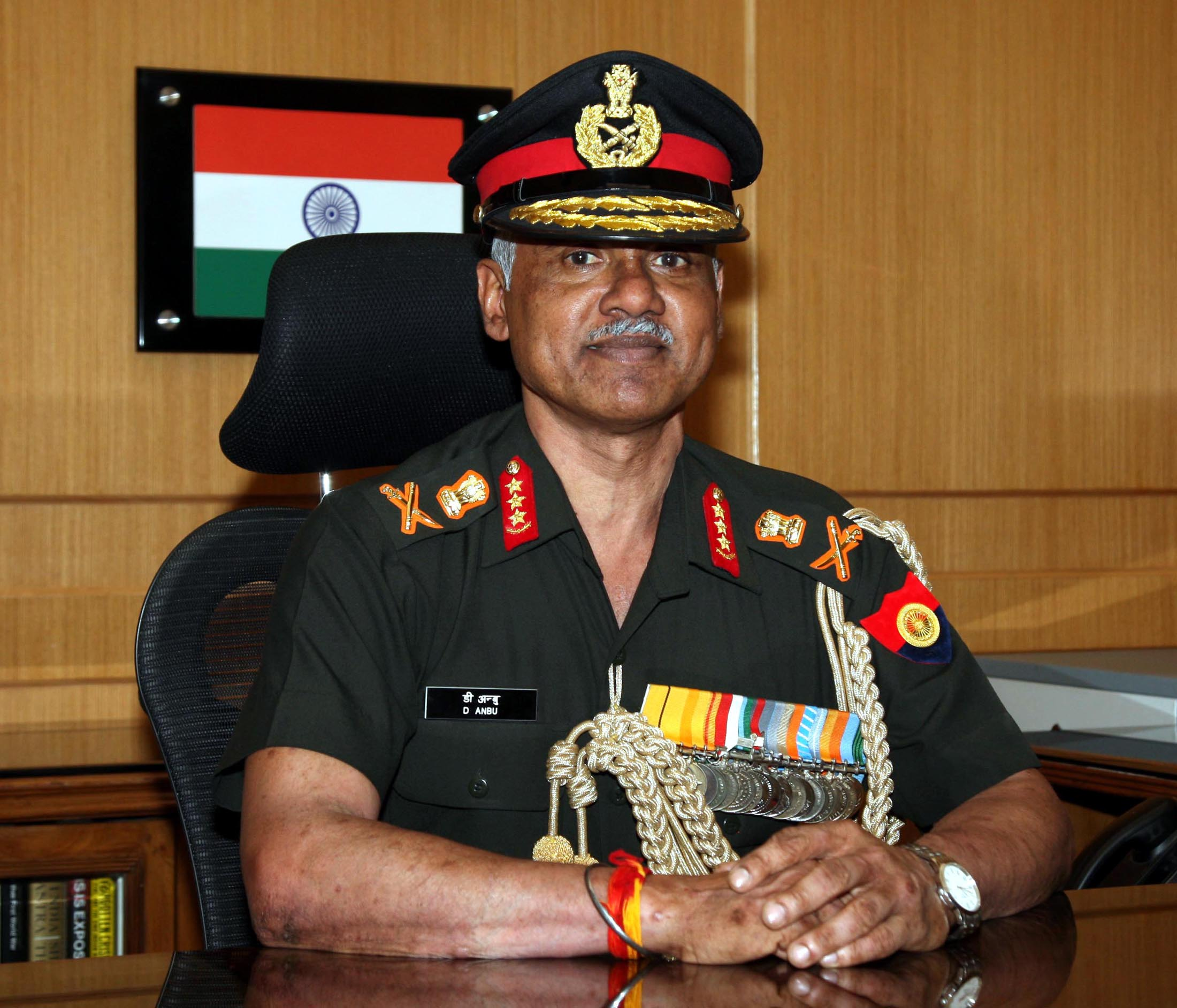

39th Vice Chief of the Army Staff
- In office 1 June 2018 – 31 August 2019
- President: Ram Nath Kovind
- Chief of Army Staff: Bipin Rawat
- Preceded by: Sarath Chand
- Succeeded by: Manoj Mukund Naravane

General Officer Commanding-in-Chief Northern Command
- In office 1 December 2016 – 31 May 2018
- Chief of Army Staff: Dalbir Singh Suhag; Bipin Rawat
- Preceded by: Deependra Singh Hooda
- Succeeded by: Ranbir Singh

Military service
- Allegiance: India
- Branch/service: Indian Army
- Years of service: 7 June 1980 – 31 August 2019
- Rank: Lieutenant General
- Unit: 14 Sikh Light Infantry
- Commands: Northern Command; IV Corps; 17 Mountain Division; 53 Infantry Brigade
- Battles/wars: Operation Parakram; Operation Pawan; Operation Meghdoot
- Service number: IC-38654
- Awards: Param Vishisht Seva Medal; Uttam Yudh Seva Medal; Ati Vishisht Seva Medal; Yudh Seva Medal; Sena Medal

Lieutenant General Devraj Anbu, PVSM, UYSM, AVSM, YSM, SM, ADC is a retired general officer of the Indian Army who served as 39th Vice Chief of Army Staff (VCOAS). He assumed office on 1 June 2018 following the retirement of Lieutenant General Sarath Chand, and retired on 31 August 2019. He also served as General Officer-Commanding-in-Chief Northern Command from 1 December 2016 to 31 May 2018, prior to that commanding Northern Command, he had commanded IV Corps in the North East.

== Early life and education ==
Gen Anbu is an alumnus of Sainik School, Amaravathinagar, the National Defence Academy, Pune and Defence Services Staff College, Wellington. He also attended the higher command course at Army War College, Mhow and a National Defence College equivalent university at Jakarta, Indonesia.

== Military career ==
He was commissioned into 14th Sikh Light Infantry on 7 June 1980. He has vast experience and has served in all types of operational environments ranging including Siachen Glacier; Counter-Insurgency Operations in Kashmir and Manipur; Operation Pawan in Sri Lanka. He has commanded a unit during Operation Parakram; a 53 Infantry brigade on the Line Of Control; 17 Mountain Division in Sikkim; Indian Military Training Team in Bhutan; IV Corps (Tezpur). He has held staff appointments which include General Staff Operation at the Division level in North-East India, General Staff Operation at Corps Level in Kashmir, and Military observer with UN peacekeeping mission in Namibia (UNTAG).

During 37 years of his career he has been awarded the Sena Medal for Operation Meghdoot, Yudh Seva Medal (2010) for command of 53 Infantry brigade, the Ati Vishisht Seva Medal for the command of 17 Mountain division, Uttam Yudh Seva Medal (2016) and the Param Vishisht Seva Medal (2017) for his service as General Officer Commanding-in-Chief, Northern Command. He is also the Colonel Of The Regiment of the Sikh Light Infantry .

== Honours and decorations ==
The general officer has been awarded with the Param Vishisht Seva Medal in 2017, Uttam Yudh Seva Medal in 2016, Ati Vishisht Seva Medal, Yudh Seva Medal in 2010 and the Sena Medal.

| Param Vishisht Seva Medal | Uttam Yudh Seva Medal | | Ati Vishisht Seva Medal |
| Yudh Seva Medal | Sena Medal | Wound Medal | Samanya Seva Medal |
| Special Service Medal | Siachen Glacier Medal | Operation Vijay Medal | Operation Parakram Medal |
| Sainya Seva Medal | High Altitude Service Medal | Videsh Seva Medal | 50th Anniversary of Independence Medal |
| 30 Years Long Service Medal | 20 Years Long Service Medal | 9 Years Long Service Medal | UNTAG |

== Dates of rank ==
| Insignia | Rank | Component | Date of rank |
|---|---|---|---|
| | Second Lieutenant | Indian Army | 7 June 1980 |
| | Lieutenant | Indian Army | 7 June 1982 |
| | Captain | Indian Army | 7 June 1985 |
| | Major | Indian Army | 7 June 1991 |
| | Lieutenant-Colonel | Indian Army | 31 December 2002 |
| | Colonel | Indian Army | 1 February 2005 |
| | Brigadier | Indian Army | 1 August 2008 (seniority from 7 January 2008) |
| | Major General | Indian Army | 1 January 2013 (seniority from 4 April 2011) |
| | Lieutenant-General | Indian Army | 12 October 2015 (substantive) |

== Personal life ==
Lt Gen Anbu's father late Shri. Devaraj also rendered his services in Army. They hail from an agricultural family from Madurai, Usilampatti, Vagaikulam village. He is married to Mrs Gowri Anbu and they have a son who is serving in the Indian Army. He likes yoga, painting and gardening.

Military offices
| Preceded by Sarath Chand | Vice Chief of Army Staff; 1 June 2018 – 31 August 2019 | Succeeded by Manoj Mukund Naravane |
| Preceded by D S Hooda | General Officer-Commanding-in-Chief Northern Command; 1 December 2016 – 31 May 2018 | Succeeded by Ranbir Singh |
| Preceded by Sarath Chand | General Officer Commanding IV Corps; 17 November 2015 – 24 December 2016 | Succeeded by Amarjeet Singh Bedi |
