= S. K. Singh (general) =

Retired Indian military general

Lieutenant General S. K. Singh PVSM, UYSM, AVSM
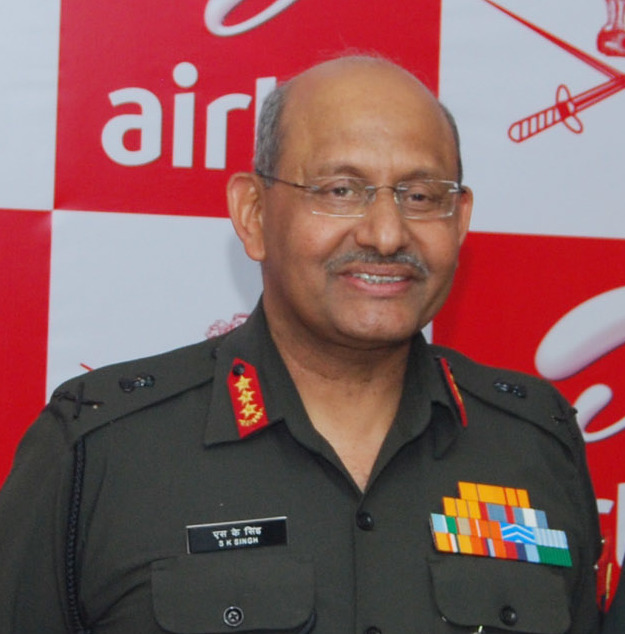

33rd Vice Chief of the Army Staff
- In office 1 October 2011 – 31 December 2013
- President: Pratibha Patil; Pranab Mukherjee
- Prime Minister: Manmohan Singh
- Preceded by: Arvinder Singh Lamba
- Succeeded by: Dalbir Singh Suhag

Personal details
- Party: Jan Suraaj Party
- Awards: Param Vishisht Seva Medal; Uttam Yudh Seva Medal; Ati Vishisht Seva Medal

Military service
- Allegiance: India
- Branch/service: Indian Army
- Years of service: December 1972 – December 2013
- Rank: Lieutenant General
- Unit: 8 Gorkha Rifles; Parachute Regiment
- Commands: South Western Army; Army Training Command; XIV Corps; 16th Infantry Division
- Battles/wars: Counter-insurgency operations in Nagaland and Manipur; Indian Peace Keeping Force in Sri Lankan Civil War

Lieutenant General Shri Krishna Singh, PVSM, UYSM, AVSM is a retired Indian Army General. He served as the Vice Chief of the Army Staff of the Indian Army from 2011 to 2013. He was announced as a candidate of Jan Suraaj Party from Tarari Assembly constituency in the 2024 bypolls held in Bihar but he was later replaced.

== Career ==
Singh was commissioned shortly after the Indo-Pakistan War of 1971, into 8 Gorkha Rifles. He later joined the Parachute Regiment, and served in combat during counter-insurgency operations in Nagaland and Manipur, and in the Indian Peace Keeping Force (IPKF) in the Sri Lankan Civil War.

Singh commanded a brigade in the Siachen Glacier, the 16th Infantry Division on the Line of Control and the strike corps XIV Corps. As a Major General, he also headed the Indian Military Training Team in Bhutan. After his promotion to Army Commander grade, he commanded the Army Training Command (ARTRAC), and South Western Command, before taking up the post of Vice Chief.

Singh served as Vice Chief of Army Staff from November 2011 to his retirement in December 2013. He debuted in politics by joining Jan suraaj party.He is candidate of Jan Suraaj Party from Tarari Assembly constituency in bypoll 2024.

== Honours and decorations ==

| Param Vishisht Seva Medal | | Uttam Yudh Seva Medal | |
| Ati Vishisht Seva Medal | Special Service Medal | | Siachen Glacier Medal |
| Operation Parakram Medal | Sainya Seva Medal | High Altitude Service Medal | Videsh Seva Medal |
| 50th Anniversary of Independence Medal | 30 Years Long Service Medal | 20 Years Long Service Medal | 9 Years Long Service Medal |

Military offices
| Preceded by A S Lamba | Vice Chief of Army Staff; 1 October 2011 – 31 December 2013 | Succeeded by Dalbir Singh |
| Preceded by C K S Sabu | General Officer-Commanding-in-Chief South Western Command; 1 December 2010 – 1 October 2011 | Succeeded by Gyan Bhushan |
