= Sikh Pioneers & Sikh Light Infantry Association UK =

- Formation: 1950; 76 years ago
- Legal status: Non-profit organisation
- Location: London
- Region served: United Kingdom
- Members: Open to former British officers of the Sikh Pioneers and Sikh Light Infantry
- Chair: General Sir Reginald Savory, KCIE, CB, DSO, MC
- Key people: Captain HCT Routley (honorary secretary)
- Main organ: Membership committee
- Affiliations: Sikh Light Infantry

The Sikh Pioneers & Sikh Light Infantry Association UK is an association for former British officers who served with the Sikh Pioneers and Sikh Light Infantry regiments. The Sikh Pioneers formed originally in 1857 from Mazhabi Sikh and Ramdasia Sikh soldiers served and functioned throughout the 19th and early 20th century. The Sikh Light Infantry was formed in 1944 for the Second World War conflict, and was a successor to the Sikh Pioneers.

== History ==
The Association, for former British officers of the Sikh Pioneers and Sikh Light Infantry, their wives and widows, was formed after Independence and meet once a year during October, in London. The first record is of the 1950 Reunion and Lieutenant Colonel EPF Pearse was the Honorary Secretary. 32 attendees were from the Sikh Pioneers and 17 were from the Sikh Light Infantry.

A luncheon is organized on the first Saturday of October every year and a quarterly newsletter is distributed to keep members updated on information about the Regiment. General Savory was usually in the chair at the luncheons till his death. The 1961 Reunion had Mrs. Clare Spurgin (widow of the co-author, with General MacMunn, of the "History of the Sikh Pioneers") give her talk on her visit to India and visiting the 3rd Battalion Sikh Light Infantry and the Regimental Centre. The 1963 Reunion had Field Marshal Viscount Slim as a guest.

Lieutenant Colonel JF Peart took over as the Honorary Secretary for the Association in 1965.

Three pieces of Sikh Pioneers silver were presented to the Regiment. The magnificent Dragon Bowl (which was the centre piece of the 34th Royal Sikh Pioneers, commemorating their service in China), the Kelly Rose Bowl of the 23rd Sikh Pioneers (commemorating Colonel Kelly's march to relieve Chitral in 1895; and the unique Pioneer Picquet Memorial (commemorating the action of 3/34th Sikh Pioneers on 21 December 1919) Captain Douglas Rees took over as the Honorary Secretary in 1968.

General Frank Messervy was the principal guest at the 1972 Reunion. Captain John Hookway, of 2nd battalion Sikh Light Infantry, took over as the Honorary Secretary in 1974 and continued at this post for over 25 years. He died on 30 June 2005. The 1975 Reunion was highlighted by the visit of Brigadier Goadby to the Regimental Centre.

In 1981 the Colour Presentation saw a large contingent travel to Fatehgarh, followed by another visit in 1984. Subsequent visits have been for the Golden Jubilee of 1st Battalion Sikh Light Infantry in 1991 and the Colour presentation to the 15th and 16th battalions of the Sikh Light Infantry respectively in 1994. General VP Malik attended a reunion in London in 1996 and General Chatterjee in 1997.

== Chair ==
General Sir Reginald Savory, KCIE, CB, DSO, MC

== Honorary Secretary ==
- Lieutenant Colonel EPF Pearse - 1950
- Lieutenant Colonel JF Peart - 1965
- Captain Douglas Rees - 1968
- Captain John Hookway (2nd Battalion Sikh Light Infantry) - 1974
- Captain HCT Routley (1st Battalion Sikh Light Infantry) - present

== Notable guests ==
- Field Marshal Viscount Slim -1963
- General Frank Messervy - 1972
- General VP Malik - 1996
- General Chatterjee - 1997
