= Vice Chief of the Army Staff (India) =

Indian army position

- Flag of the Vice Chief of the Army Staff

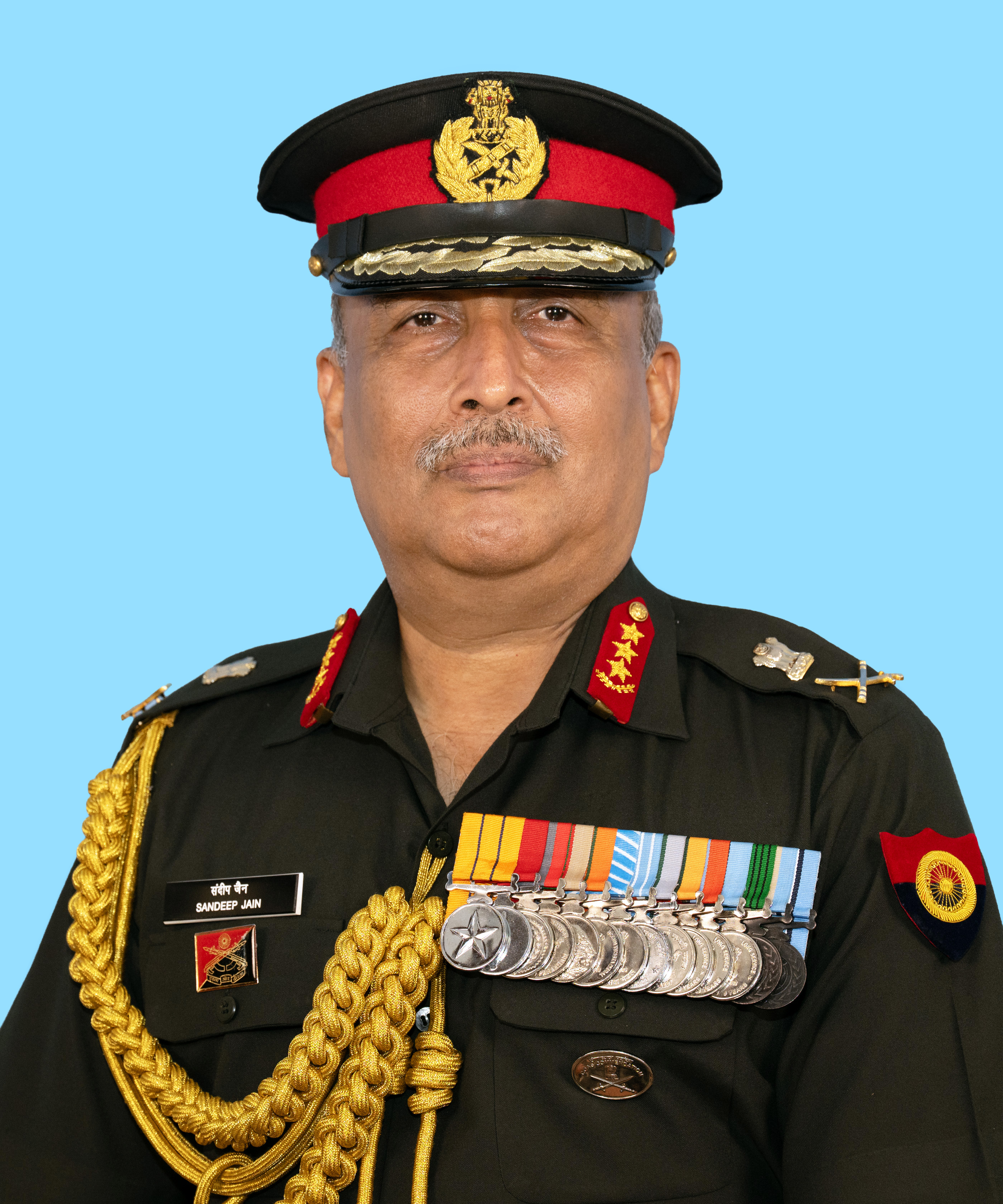
- Incumbent; Lieutenant General Sandeep Jain; AVSM SM since 1 July 2026
- Indian Army
- Status: Second in command
- Abbreviation: VCOAS
- Reports to: Chief of the Army Staff
- Residence: Residence 25, Safdarjung Road, New Delhi
- Seat: Room No. 234, South Block, Central Secretariat, Integrated Headquarters(Army) of Ministry of Defence, New Delhi
- Appointer: ACC
- Constituting instrument: Army Act, 1950 (Act No. 46 of 1950)
- Formation: 15 January 1965; 61 years ago
- First holder: P. P. Kumaramangalam

The Vice Chief of the Army Staff (VCOAS) is a statutory position in the Indian Armed Forces usually held by a three star Lieutenant General. As the second highest ranking officer in the Indian Army, the VCOAS serves as the deputy professional head of the Indian Army and the senior most Principal Staff Officer (PSO) to the Chief of the Army Staff. The VCOAS serves as the senior adviser to the Minister of Defence. The office holder is usually the second most senior army officer unless the Chief of Defence is an army officer.

The current VCOAS is Lieutenant General Sandeep Jain who assumed the office on 1 July 2026.

== History ==
Following India's independence and the partition of the British Indian Army on 15 August 1947, the Indian Army underwent rapid reorganization to establish sovereign command structures. The hierarchy featured a Commander-in-Chief at the apex, assisted by the Chief of General Staff (CGS) as the principal staff officer responsible for operational planning and administration.

The CGS remained the number two officer in the Indian Army below the Commander-in-Chief, India and later the Chief of Army Staff. In January 1959, the post of Deputy Chief of the Army Staff (DCOAS) was created to replace the CGS at the Army HQ. The DCOAS became the second-in-command and was equivalent to an Army Commander (GOC-in-C).

On 15 January 1965, the CGS designation was redesignated as the Vice Chief of the Army Staff (VCOAS), with the DCOAS becoming a PSO appointment. On 15 January 1965, Lieutenant General Paramasiva Prabhakar Kumaramangalam took over as the first Vice Chief of the Army Staff.

== Order of Precedence ==
The VCOAS ranks at No. 23 on the Indian order of precedence, along with the Vice Chiefs of Staff of the Indian Navy and Indian Air Force and the Army Commanders (GOC-in-C), Naval Commanders (FOC-in-C) and Air Commanders (AOC-in-C).

The VCOAS is at the Apex Pay grade (Grade 17), with a monthly pay of ₹225,000 (US$3,200).

== Appointment ==
The Vice Chief of Army staff is appointed by the Appointments Committee of the Cabinet, chaired by the Prime Minister, from among the senior general officers of the Army. Since the appointment is of Commander-in-Chief grade, the appointees are usually one of the Army Commanders of the seven commands.

Unlike the Chief of Army Staff, there is no fixed term nor term limit to the position of the VCOAS, although most of those appointed to the office have typically served for two or three year tenures and serve until the age of 60.

== Appointees ==
The following table chronicles the appointees to the office of the Vice Chief of the Army Staff.

| S.No. | Portrait | Name | Assumed office | Left office | Unit of Commission | COAS | Ref |
|---|---|---|---|---|---|---|---|
| 1 | | Lieutenant General Paramsiva Prabhakar Kumaramangalam, DSO MBE | 15 January 1965 | 7 June 1966 | Regiment of Artillery | Gen. J. N. Chaudhuri | |
| 2 | | Lieutenant General Kashmir Singh Katoch, MC | 8 June 1966 | 22 November 1970 | East Surrey Regiment | Gen. Kumaramangalam | |
| 2 | | Lieutenant General Kashmir Singh Katoch, MC | 8 June 1966 | 22 November 1970 | East Surrey Regiment | Field Marshal Manekshaw | |
| 3 | | Lieutenant General Har Prasad, PVSM | 23 November 1970 | 31 October 1973 | 3rd Cavalry | Field Marshal Manekshaw | |
| 3 | | Lieutenant General Har Prasad, PVSM | 23 November 1970 | 31 October 1973 | 3rd Cavalry | Gen. Bewoor | |
| 4 | | Lieutenant General Mohan Lal Thapan, PVSM | 1 November 1973 | 31 July 1974 | Jat Regiment | Gen. Bewoor | |
| 5 | | Lieutenant General Naveen Chand Rawlley, PVSM AVSM MC | 1 August 1974 | 31 December 1975 | 12th Frontier Force | Gen. Bewoor | |
| 5 | | Lieutenant General Naveen Chand Rawlley, PVSM AVSM MC | 1 August 1974 | 31 December 1975 | 12th Frontier Force | Gen. Raina | |
| 6 | | Lieutenant General Abhi Manyu Vohra, PVSM | 1 January 1976 | 19 January 1977 | 3rd Gorkha Rifles | Gen. Raina | |
| 7 | | Lieutenant General Om Prakash Malhotra, PVSM | 20 January 1977 | 31 May 1978 | Regiment of Artillery | Gen. Raina | |
| 8 | | Lieutenant General Stanley Leslie Menezes, PVSM SC | 1 July 1978 | 31 January 1980 | The Grenadiers | Gen. Malhotra | |
| 9 | | Lieutenant General Jaswant Singh, PVSM AVSM | 1 February 1980 | 6 July 1980 | Punjab Regiment | Gen. Malhotra | |
| 10 | | Lieutenant General Adi Meherji Sethna, PVSM AVSM | 7 July 1980 | 31 December 1982 | 6th Rajputana Rifles | Gen. Malhotra | |
| 10 | | Lieutenant General Adi Meherji Sethna, PVSM AVSM | 7 July 1980 | 31 December 1982 | 6th Rajputana Rifles | Gen. Krishna Rao | |
| 11 | | Lieutenant General Srinivas Kumar Sinha, PVSM | 1 January 1983 | 1 June 1983 | Jat Regiment | Gen. Krishna Rao | |
| 12 | | Lieutenant General Gajendra Singh Rawat, PVSM AVSM | 5 August 1983 | 31 December 1984 | 5th Gorkha Rifles (FF) | Gen. Vaidya | |
| 13 | | Lieutenant General Krishnaswamy Sundarji, PVSM | 13 February 1985 | 31 January 1986 | 2 Mahar Regiment | Gen. Vaidya | |
| 14 | | Lieutenant General K. K. Hazari, PVSM AVSM | 1 February 1986 | 31 May 1987 | Regiment of Artillery | Gen. Sundarji | |
| 15 | | Lieutenant General J. K. Puri, PVSM AVSM | 1 June 1987 | 31 August 1987 | Regiment of Artillery | Gen. Sundarji | |
| 16 | | Lieutenant General Sunith Francis Rodrigues, PVSM AVSM | 1 November 1987 | 20 April 1989 | Regiment of Artillery | Gen. Sundarji | |
| 16 | | Lieutenant General Sunith Francis Rodrigues, PVSM AVSM | 1 November 1987 | 20 April 1989 | Regiment of Artillery | Gen. Sharma | |
| 17 | | Lieutenant General V. K. Sood, PVSM AVSM | 15 May 1989 | 29 February 1992 | Dogra Regiment | Gen. Sharma | |
| 17 | | Lieutenant General V. K. Sood, PVSM AVSM | 15 May 1989 | 29 February 1992 | Dogra Regiment | Gen. Rodrigues | |
| 18 | | Lieutenant General Vijai Singh, PVSM | 1 March 1992 | 30 June 1993 | 8th Light Cavalry | Gen. Rodrigues | |
| 19 | | Lieutenant General Surinder Nath, PVSM AVSM | 1 July 1993 | 30 June 1995 | Regiment of Artillery | Gen. Joshi | |
| 19 | | Lieutenant General Surinder Nath, PVSM AVSM | 1 July 1993 | 30 June 1995 | Regiment of Artillery | Gen. S. R. Chowdhary | |
| 20 | | Lieutenant General M. L. Dar, PVSM AVSM | 1 July 1995 | 31 July 1996 | 17th Horse (Poona Horse) | Gen. S. R. Chowdhary | |
| 21 | | Lieutenant General Ved Prakash Malik, PVSM AVSM | 1 August 1996 | 30 September 1997 | Sikh Light Infantry | Gen. S. R. Chowdhary | |
| 22 | | Lieutenant General Chandra Shekhar, PVSM AVSM ADC | 1 October 1997 | 30 September 2000 | 4th Gorkha Rifles | Gen. Malik | |
| 23 | | Lieutenant General Vijay Oberoi, PVSM AVSM VSM | 1 October 2000 | 30 September 2001 | Maratha Light Infantry | Gen. Padmanabhan | |
| 24 | | Lieutenant General Nirmal Chand Vij, PVSM UYSM AVSM | 1 October 2001 | 31 December 2002 | Dogra Regiment | Gen. Padmanabhan | |
| 25 | | Lieutenant General Shantonu Choudhry, PVSM AVSM VSM | 1 January 2003 | 31 December 2004 | Regiment of Artillery | Gen. Vij | |
| 26 | | Lieutenant General Bhupinder Singh Thakur, PVSM AVSM | 15 January 2005 | 30 September 2005 | Central India Horse | Gen. Vij | |
| 26 | | Lieutenant General Bhupinder Singh Thakur, PVSM AVSM | 15 January 2005 | 30 September 2005 | Central India Horse | Gen. J. J. Singh | |
| 27 | | Lieutenant General S. Pattabhiraman, PVSM AVSM SM VSM | 1 October 2005 | 31 December 2006 | Bombay Sappers | Gen. J. J. Singh | |
| 28 | | Lieutenant General Deepak Kapoor, PVSM AVSM SM VSM ADC | 1 January 2007 | 30 September 2007 | Regiment of Artillery | Gen. J. J. Singh | |
| 29 | | Lieutenant General Milan Lalitkumar Naidu, PVSM AVSM YSM | 1 October 2007 | 31 December 2008 | Rajput Regiment | Gen. Kapoor | |
| 30 | | Lieutenant General Noble Thamburaj, PVSM SM | 1 January 2008 | 30 September 2009 | Bombay Sappers | Gen. Kapoor | |
| 31 | | Lieutenant General Prabodh Chandra Bhardwaj, PVSM AVSM VrC SC VSM | 1 October 2009 | 30 November 2010 | Parachute Regiment | Gen. Kapoor | |
| 31 | | Lieutenant General Prabodh Chandra Bhardwaj, PVSM AVSM VrC SC VSM | 1 October 2009 | 30 November 2010 | Parachute Regiment | Gen. V. K. Singh | |
| 32 | | Lieutenant General Arvinder Singh Lamba, PVSM AVSM | 6 December 2010 | 30 September 2011 | Regiment of Artillery | Gen. V. K. Singh | |
| 33 | | Lieutenant General Sri Krishna Singh, PVSM UYSM AVSM | 1 October 2011 | 31 December 2013 | 8th Gorkha Rifles | Gen. V. K. Singh | |
| 33 | | Lieutenant General Sri Krishna Singh, PVSM UYSM AVSM | 1 October 2011 | 31 December 2013 | 8th Gorkha Rifles | Gen. Bikram Singh | |
| 34 | | Lieutenant General Dalbir Singh Suhag, PVSM UYSM AVSM VSM ADC | 1 January 2014 | 31 July 2014 | 5th Gorkha Rifles (FF) | Gen. Bikram Singh | |
| 35 | | Lieutenant General Philip Campose, PVSM AVSM VSM | 1 August 2014 | 31 July 2015 | 9th Gorkha Rifles | Gen. Dalbir Singh | |
| 36 | | Lieutenant General Man Mohan Singh Rai, PVSM AVSM VSM | 1 August 2015 | 31 July 2016 | Bombay Sappers | Gen. Dalbir Singh | |
| 37 | | Lieutenant General Bipin Rawat, PVSM UYSM AVSM YSM SM VSM ADC | 1 September 2016 | 31 December 2016 | 11th Gorkha Rifles | Gen. Dalbir Singh | |
| 38 | | Lieutenant General Sarath Chand, PVSM UYSM AVSM VSM | 13 January 2017 | 31 May 2018 | Garhwal Rifles | Gen. Rawat | |
| 39 | | Lieutenant General Devraj Anbu, PVSM UYSM AVSM YSM SM ADC | 1 June 2018 | 31 August 2019 | Sikh Light Infantry | Gen. Rawat | |
| 40 | | Lieutenant General Manoj Mukund Naravane, PVSM AVSM SM VSM ADC | 1 September 2019 | 30 December 2019 | Sikh Light Infantry | Gen. Rawat | |
| 41 | | Lieutenant General Satinder Kumar Saini, PVSM AVSM YSM VSM ADC | 25 January 2020 | 31 January 2021 | Jat Regiment | Gen. Naravane | |
| 42 | | Lieutenant General Chandi Prasad Mohanty, PVSM AVSM SM VSM ADC | 1 February 2021 | 31 January 2022 | Rajput Regiment | Gen. Naravane | |
| 43 | | Lieutenant General Manoj Pande, PVSM AVSM VSM ADC | 1 February 2022 | 30 April 2022 | Bombay Sappers | Gen. Naravane | |
| 44 | | Lieutenant General Baggavalli Somashekar Raju PVSM UYSM AVSM YSM | 1 May 2022 | 28 February 2023 | Jat Regiment | Gen. Pande | |
| 45 | | Lieutenant General M. V. Suchindra Kumar, PVSM AVSM YSM** VSM | 1 March 2023 | 18 February 2024 | Assam Regiment | Gen. Pande | |
| 46 | | Lieutenant General Upendra Dwivedi, PVSM AVSM | 19 February 2024 | 30 June 2024 | Jammu and Kashmir RIfles | Gen. Pande | |
| 47 | | Lieutenant General N. S. Raja Subramani, PVSM AVSM SM VSM | 1 July 2024 | 31 July 2025 | Garhwal Rifles | Gen. Dwivedi | |
| 48 | | Lieutenant General Pushpendra Pal Singh, AVSM SM** | 1 August 2025 | 31 March 2026 | Parachute Regiment | Gen. Dwivedi | |
| 49 | | Lieutenant General Dhiraj Seth, PVSM UYSM AVSM | 1 April 2026 | 30 June 2026 | 2nd Lancers (Gardner's Horse) | Gen. Dwivedi | |
| 50 | | Lieutenant General Sandeep Jain, AVSM SM | 1 July 2026 | Incumbent | Mahar Regiment | Gen. Seth | |

== See also ==
- Chief of the Army Staff
- Vice Chief of the Naval Staff
- Vice Chief of the Air Staff

== Notes ==
1.Later promoted to the rank of General.
