= Attorney General Mathews =

Attorney General Mathews may refer to:

- David Mathews (died 1800), Attorney General of Nova Scotia
- Henry M. Mathews (1830s–1884), Attorney General of West Virginia
- Jeremy Fell Mathews (born 1941), Attorney General of Hong Kong
- Robert F. Matthews Jr. (1923–2010), Attorney General of Kentucky

== See also ==
- General Mathews (disambiguation)
