= Philip Campose =

Lieutenant General, Indian Army

Lieutenant General Philip Campose PVSM, AVSM**, VSM
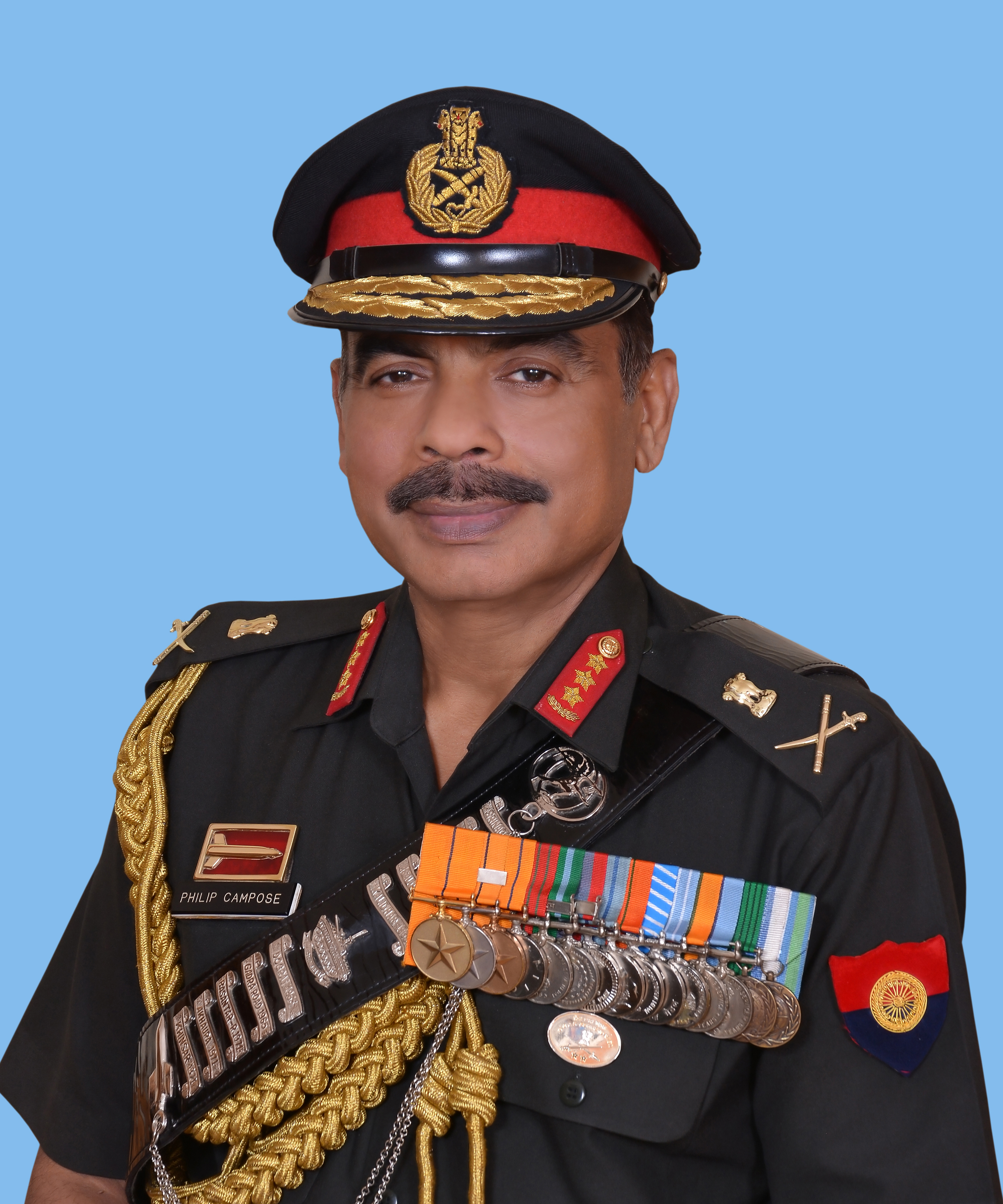
- Official Photograph
- Education: St. Xavier's School, Delhi; IMA
- Military career
- Allegiance: India
- Branch: Indian Army
- Service years: 1974 – 31 July 2015
- Rank: Lieutenant General
- Service number: IC-30702N
- Units: Mechanised Infantry Regiment; 9 Gorkha Rifles
- Commands: Western Command; XII Corps
- Awards: Param Vishisht Seva Medal; Ati Vishist Seva Medal; Vishisht Seva Medal

Lieutenant General Philip Campose, PVSM, AVSM & Bar, VSM was the Vice Chief of Army Staff of the Indian Army and assumed office on 1 August 2014 succeeding General Dalbir Singh. He retired on 31 July 2015 and was succeeded by Lieutenant General Man Mohan Singh Rai.

== Early life and education ==
Campose is an alumnus of St. Xavier's School, Delhi; National Defence Academy, Pune and Indian Military Academy, Dehradun. He also completed various command courses from Defence Services Staff College, Wellington; National Defence College, New Delhi; the Higher Command Course at Army War College, Mhow and a tactical course in Russia. He holds a master's degree in philosophy in Defence Management and Security Studies and in Strategic Studies from Indore and Madras Universities respectively.

== Career ==
Campose was commissioned into 9 Gorkha Rifles in 1974 and was later transferred to the Mechanised Infantry Regiment in 1982. He has vast operational and command experience including commander of a mechanized infantry battalion; commander of an infantry division near the Line of Control in Jammu and Kashmir; Brigade Major of an Armoured Brigade; Colonel of General Staff of a counter insurgency division in north-east India; Deputy Director General of Strategy at the Directorate of Perspective Planning; Chief Staff Officer (Land Vector) at the headquarters of Strategic Forces Command and Commander of XII Corps (Jodhpur). He has also served as an instructor at National Defence Academy, Defence Services Staff College and at the tactical wing of Armoured Corps Centre and School (ACCS). He was deputed to United Nations peace keeping missions in former Yugoslavia and northern Iraq. In 2013, on being promoted to the rank to Army Commander, he was appointed as the General Officer Commanding-in-Chief of the Western Command, prior to his appointment as the Vice Chief of the Army Staff (VCOAS) of Indian Army. He succeeded Lieutenant General Dalbir Singh as the Vice Chief of Army Staff, who was promoted to the rank of full general and appointed as the Chief of the Army Staff. He was also the colonel commandant of the Mechanised Infantry Regiment.

During his career of more than four decades, he was awarded the Param Vishist Seva Medal (January 2015), Ati Vishisht Seva Medal** (January 2014 and January 2013) and Vishisht Seva Medal (January 2011) for his distinguished service to the country.

== Awards and decorations ==

Param Vishisht Seva Medal	Ati Vishisht Seva Medal (bar)	Vishisht Seva Medal	General Service Medal
Samanya Seva Medal	Special Service Medal	Operation Vijay	Sainya Seva Medal
High Altitude Service Medal	Videsh Seva Medal	50th Anniversary of Independence Medal	30 Years Long Service Medal
20 Years Long Service Medal	9 Years Long Service Medal	United Nations Special Service Medal	UNPROFOR

Military offices
Preceded by Dalbir Singh	Vice Chief of Army Staff; 1 August 2014 – 31 July 2015	Succeeded by Man Mohan Singh Rai
Preceded by Sanjiv Chachra	General Officer Commanding-in-Chief Western Command; 1 July 2013 -	Succeeded by Kamal Jit Singh
Preceded by Narendra Singh	General Officer Commanding XII Corps; 3 July 2011 -	Succeeded by
