= 2023 Anantnag encounter =

Encounter in Jammu and Kashmir

2023 Anantnag Encounter
- Part of Insurgency in Jammu and Kashmir
Date	13 September 2023 – 19 September 2023 (6 days)
Location	Kokernag, Anantnag district, Jammu and Kashmir
Result	One TRF militant Uzair Khan killed; Deaths of 5 Indian security personnel, including a colonel, major and a deputy superintendent of police; Continuation of search and cordon operations inside Anantnag

Belligerents
India: Indian Army; Jammu and Kashmir Police	The Resistance Front

Commanders and leaders
Indian Army; Rajiv Ghai (GoC, 15 Corps); Major Aashish Dhonchak †; Colonel Manpreet Singh †; J&K Police: Dilbag Singh (DGP J&K Police); Vijay Kumar (ADGP Kashmir); DSP Himayun Muzzammil Bhat (SDPO Kokernag) †; Many senior officials from the Indian Army and J&K Police. (Note: Senior officers including GOC 15 Corps Rajiv Ghai, DGP Dilbagh Singh, and ADGP Kashmir Vijay Kumar, along with other top officials, were present at the encounter site.)	Uzair Khan †; Another unnamed militant †

Strength
15,000 - 25,000	2 – 3 (Indian claim)

Casualties and losses
5 killed (Indian claim); 20 killed (TRF claim)	1 killed (TRF claim) 2 killed (Indian claim)

On 13 September 2023, a confrontation erupted between Indian security forces and Kashmiri separatist militants in the Anantnag district of Jammu and Kashmir, India.

== Events ==
The week-long encounter in the Gadol forests in Anantnag district ended on 19 September, where The Resistance Front commander Uzair Khan was killed along with at least two senior Indian Army officers and a J&K Police officer. After losing 4 security forces personnel on the first day, Indian security forces were finally able to clear the militant hideout on the 7th day of the operation, as the dense jungles and rough terrain of the area provided cover for the militants.

This Anantnag encounter began when a joint operation was undertaken by the Indian Army and Jammu and Kashmir Police in the early hours of Sep 13, 2023, following inputs about a militant hideout, but the militants appeared to have anticipated the action and opened fire on the security forces. An Indian colonel, major, and the local deputy superintendent of police were killed.

Militant group The Resistance Front claimed responsibility for the encounter. The Resistance Front emerged in 2019, following the abrogation of Article 370 in Jammu and Kashmir. This group is notorious for its participation in various acts of terrorism within the region and has presented a significant challenge to security forces operating in the area. The banned Resistance Front is believed to be a shadow group of the Pakistan-based Lashkar-e-Taiba.

The operation involved the deployment of drone surveillance and the initiation of search operations aimed at capturing the militants involved. A missing soldier, Sepoy Pradeep Singh, and another militant were also found dead on the last day of the operation.

== Background ==
The encounter commenced when security forces initiated a counter-terrorism operation in the Gadol area of Kokernag Tehsil within Anantnag district, targeting the location where militants were believed to be hiding. The operation was initiated on the evening of 12 September 2023 but was temporarily halted during the night. It was then resumed on 13 September following the receipt of information indicating that they had been spotted at a hideout. The Indian military reported that they cordoned off an area where the two TRF militants were believed to be located. One of them was identified as TRF commander Uzair Khan.

== Casualties ==
The casualties resulting from the encounter included Colonel Manpreet Singh, Commanding Officer of 19 Rashtriya Rifles, a native of Mohali, Punjab, Major Aashish Dhonchak from Panipat, Haryana, and a Deputy Superintendent of the Jammu and Kashmir Police, Humayun Bhat, of Budgam, Kashmir.
