= Man Mohan Singh Rai =

Indian Army general

Lieutenant General Man Mohan Singh Rai PVSM, AVSM, VSM
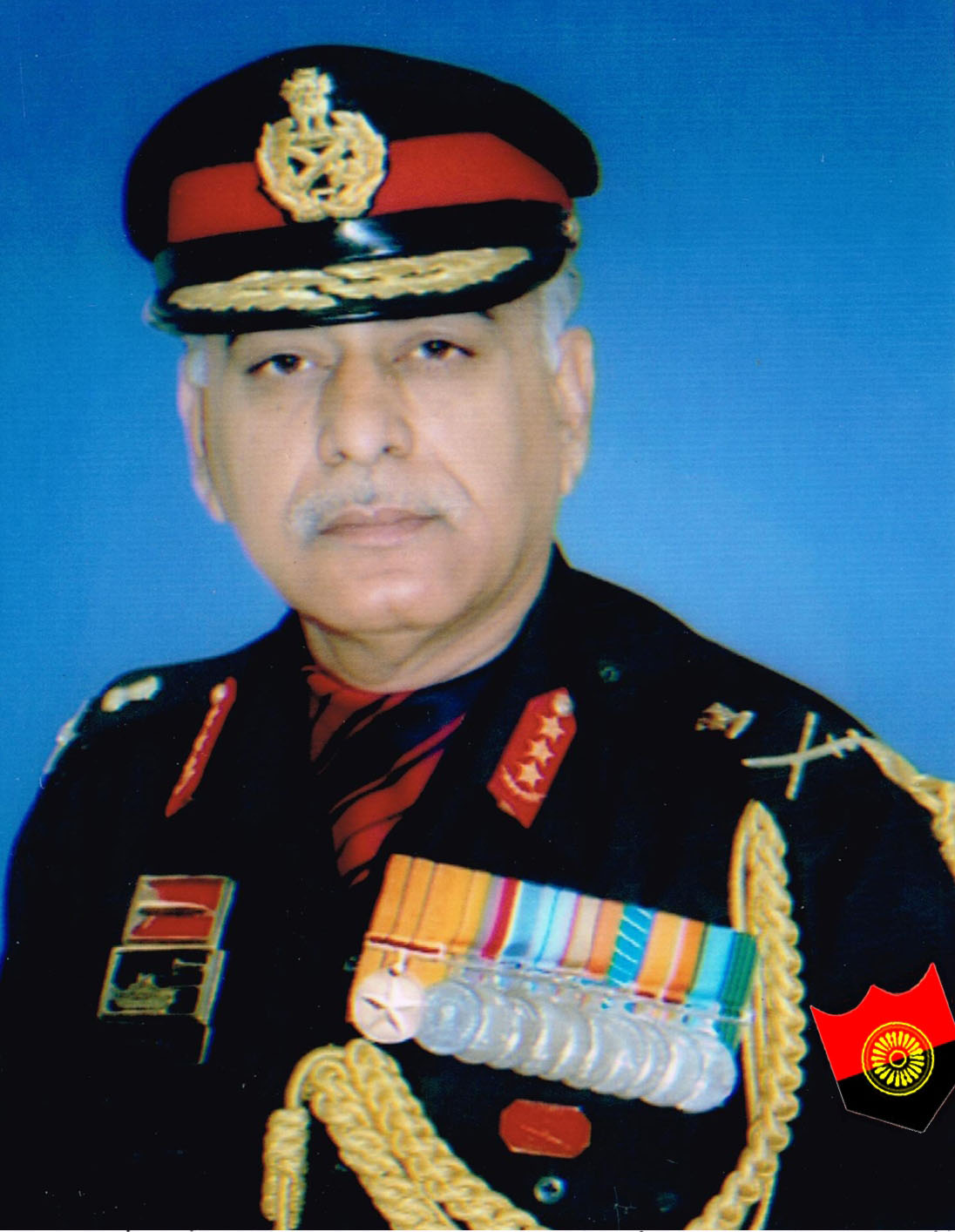
- Military career
- Allegiance: India
- Branch: Indian Army
- Service years: 15 December 1976 – 31 July 2016
- Rank: Lieutenant General
- Service number: IC-34003
- Unit: Bombay Sappers
- Commands: Eastern Army; XII Corps
- Awards: Param Vishisht Seva Medal; Ati Vishisht Seva Medal; Vishisht Seva Medal

Lieutenant General Man Mohan Singh Rai, PVSM, AVSM, VSM was the Vice Chief of Army Staff (VCOAS) of the Indian Army and assumed office on 1 August 2015 following the retirement of Lieutenant General Philip Campose. He retired on 31 July 2016 and was succeeded by General Bipin Rawat.

== Early life and education ==
Rai is an alumnus of National Defence Academy, Pune and passed out third in order of merit. He has attended Defence Services Staff College, Wellington and Army War College, Mhow.

== Career ==
Rai was commissioned into Bombay Sappers on 15 December 1976. He is a third generation officer in the army and has vast operational and command experience. He has commanded an armored engineer Regiment; a mountain brigade in the North East India; a Counter Insurgency Force in Jammu and Kashmir; XII Corps (Jodhpur); Chief of Staff South Western Command and GOC-in-C Eastern Command. He has also held various staff appointments including Directing Staff at Defence Service Staff College; Colonel General Staff Operations of a high altitude Corps; Chief Engineer of a Desert Corps; Brigadier General Staff at Army Training Command and Deputy Director General at Military Operations Directorate (Army HQ). He was also the Colonel Commandant of the Bombay Sappers.

During his career, he has been awarded the Param Vishisht Seva Medal (January 2016) as Lieutenant General, Ati Vishisht Seva Medal (January 2011) as Major General of Rashtriya Rifles in Jammu and Kashmir and Vishisht Seva Medal as Brigadier.

== Honours and decorations ==

Param Vishisht Seva Medal		Ati Vishisht Seva Medal	
Vishisht Seva Medal	Special Service Medal		Siachen Glacier Medal
Operation Vijay Medal	Operation Parakram Medal	Sainya Seva Medal	High Altitude Service Medal
50th Anniversary of Independence Medal	30 Years Long Service Medal	20 Years Long Service Medal	9 Years Long Service Medal

Military offices
Preceded by Dalbir Singh	General Officer-Commanding-in-Chief Eastern Command; 19 December 2013 – 31 July 2015	Succeeded by Praveen Bakshi
Preceded by Samer Pal Singh Dhillon	General Officer Commanding XII Corps; 9 August 2012 -	Succeeded by
Preceded by Philip Campose	Vice Chief of Army Staff; 1 August 2015 – 31 July 2016	Succeeded by Bipin Rawat
