= Bisahan, Jhajjar =

Bisahan Bishan(हरिहर नगरी)
- Village
- Location within Haryana Location within India
- Coordinates: 28.724727°N 76.562426°E
- Country: India
- State: Haryana
- District: Jhajjar

Government
  - Type: Local government
  - Body: Gram Panchayat

Area
  - Total: 6.40 km^{2} (2.47 sq mi)
  - Rank: 01
- Elevation: 222 m (728 ft)

Population (2011)
  - Total: 2,318
  - Density: 362/km^{2} (938/sq mi)

Languages
  - Official: Hindi, English, Haryanvi
- Time zone: UTC+5:30 (IST)
- PIN: 124201
- Area code: IN-HR
- Vehicle registration: HR
- Website: haryana.gov.in

Bisahan is a village in the Beri tehsil of Jhajjar district of Haryana, India. The village lies roughly 5 kilometres (3.1 mi) from the town of Beri.

Today, Bisahan is well known for Ghdoi dham (स्वर्ग स्थल) and also for number of officers and soldiers it contributes to the Indian Army and other Armed Forces of India. The village made news in October 2014 when General Dalbir Singh Suhag was appointed as a new Army Chief of India.

== Government ==
As per constitution of India and Panchyati Raaj Act, Bisahan is administrated by a Sarpanch -Inderjeet Suhag, Namberdar – Sh. Kuldeep Singh (Soul of Bisahan).

== Population and literacy ==
According to the 2011 population census, Bisahan has a population of 2,318, of which 1,216 are males and 1,102 are females. The number of children aged 0–6 is 299, which accounts for 12.90% of the total residents. The average sex ratio of Bisahan is 906, higher than Haryana state average of 879. The child sex ratio is 967, higher than Haryana average of 834.

Bisahan has a higher literacy rate compared to Haryana. In 2011, the average literacy rate in Bisahan was 79.89% compared to 75.55% in Haryana. In Bisahan, male literacy was 91.07% while female literacy rate was 67.43%.

== Transportation ==
Bisahan is situated near the town of Beri on Gurgaon-Sirsa Highway with road access to several major cities like Rohtak, Bhiwani, Gurgaon, Faridabad, Delhi, Chandigarh and Jaipur. The nearest metro station to the Bisahan village is Delhi metro Green Line, It is located in Bahadurgarh, 35 kilometres (22 mi) away.

The Bisahan village bus stand has no regular services to Beri, so villagers use their own vehicles to go to the Beri bus stand from where regular bus services are available to the nearby cities, towns and villages. These services include Jhajjar-Delhi, Rohtak-Panipat-Karnal-Ambala-Chandigarh, Jhajjar-Gurgaon-Faridabad-Palwal-Nuh-Mathura, Kalanaur-Bhiwani-Tosham-Siwani and Meham-Hansi-Hisar-Fatehabad-Sirsa-Dabwali-Ellenabad-Bhatinda-Sri Ganganagar.

The nearest railway station to the Bisahan village is Jhajjar railway station 15 kilometres (9.3 mi). Other major stations close to Bisahan are Rohtak 20 kilometres (12 mi), Bhiwani 47 kilometres (29 mi), Rewari 62 kilometres (39 mi), and Delhi 65 kilometres (40 mi).

== Notable people ==
- (Retd) Indian Army Chief of India General Dalbir Singh
