= Harish Chandra Pathak =

Indian army officer, recipient of Maha Vir Chakra

Major General Harish Chandra Pathak MVC
- Born: 30 June 1934; Mhow, India
- Died: 22 June 2015 (aged 80); New Delhi, India
- Military career
- Allegiance: India
- Branch: Indian Army
- Rank: Major General
- Unit: 8 Sikh LI
- Commands: IC-7114
- Conflicts: Battle of Fatehpur - Indo-Pakistani War of 1971
- Awards: Maha Vir Chakra

Major General Harish Chandra Pathak, MVC, AVSM (30 June 1934 – 22 June 2015) was an officer of the Indian Army, who belonged to the SikhLI Regiment. He was awarded the Maha Vir Chakra, India's second highest award for gallantry in the face of the enemy, during Battle of Fatehpur and Indo-Pakistan War of 1971.

== Early life and education ==
Major General Harish Chandra Pathak was born on 30 June 1934 in Mhow, Indore in a Kanyakubja Brahmin family. His father was a respected lawyer and Magistrate in British India. General Pathak is an alumnus of the National Defence Academy and was commissioned in the Indian Army as a Second Lieutenant in December 1954.

== Military career ==
During the Indo-Pakistani War of 1971, then Lt Col H.C. Pathak was commanding officer of 8 Sikh LI, which was tasked of capturing Fatehpur, a well-fortified position held by Pakistani troops. During the attack, the overwhelmingly superiorly equipped Pakistani troops were able to inflict heavy casualties on the assaulting Indian troops through intense and accurate artillery and small arms fire. Lieutenant Colonel Pathak, disregarding his personal safety and displaying high courage, personally led the charge and captured the objective after fierce hand-to-hand fighting. The enemy launched two fierce counterattacks, inflicting heavy casualties on his men. He continued to hold fort, provide leadership under extreme circumstances and beat back both the counterattacks, while also inflicting heavy casualties on the enemy.

For his gallantry and leadership, Lt Colonel H.C.Pathak was awarded the Maha Vir Chakra, India's second highest Award for Gallantry in the face of the enemy.

This battle was part of the Battle of Fatehpur, one of the major battles of the 1971 war.

Lt Colonel H.C.Pathak later rose to the rank of Major General. In 1984 he was awarded an Ati Vishist Seva Medal by the President for distinguished service. He died on 22 June 2015 due to natural causes.

He is survived by his wife Mrs Kanta Pathak, daughter Ms Shabnam Singh and son Mr Rohit Pathak.

== See also ==
- Indo-Pakistani War of 1971
