= Amarjeet Singh Bedi =

Indian Army general

Lieutenant General Amarjeet Singh Bedi PVSM, UYSM, YSM, VSM
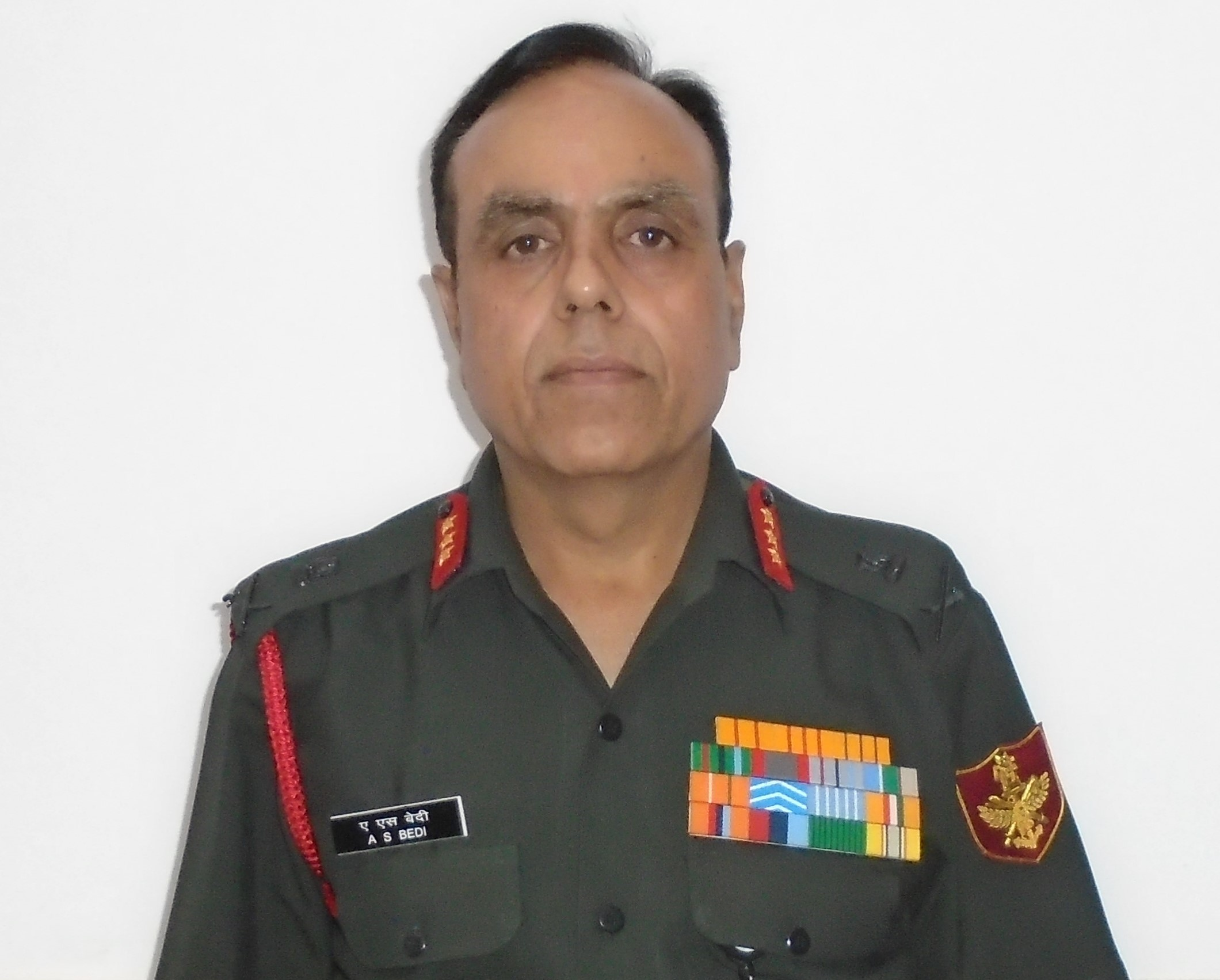
- Military career
- Allegiance: India
- Branch: Indian Army
- Service years: 13 June 1981 – 30 April 2020
- Rank: Lieutenant General
- Service number: IC-39465W
- Unit: Garhwal Rifles
- Commands: IV Corps; 3 Division; 3 Infantry Brigade
- Awards: Param Vishisht Seva Medal; Uttam Yudh Seva Medal; Yudh Seva Medal; Vishisht Seva Medal

Lieutenant General Amarjeet Singh Bedi PVSM UYSM, YSM, VSM is a former Commander of the IV Corps of the Indian Army and assumed office on 25 November 2016. He assumed the post from Lt General Devraj Anbu.

== Early life and education ==
Bedi has attended the Senior Command Course at Army War College, Mhow; Defence Service Staff College course at Defence Services Staff College, Wellington; Higher Command Course from National Defence University, Beijing and National Defence Course at National Defence College, Delhi.

== Career ==
Bedi was commissioned into The Garhwal Rifles on 13 June 1981. He has held various important Command, Staff and Instructor appointments during his career. He has commanded 'The Formidable Fifth' Brigade, oldest infantry brigade of the Indian Army, in Arunachal Pradesh; 3rd Infantry Division (Trishul Division) in Leh and General Officer Commanding (GOC), Bengal Area. He has held various staff appointments including Colonel General Staff (China) at HQ Army Training Command and Major General General staff at HQ Eastern Command.

During his career, he has been awarded the Vishisht Seva Medal (2012), the Yudh Seva Medal (2015) and the Uttam Yudh Seva Medal (2018) Param Vishisht Seva Medal (2020)for his service.

== Honours and decorations ==

Param Vishisht Seva Medal	Uttam Yudh Seva Medal	Yudh Seva Medal	Vishisht Seva Medal
Samanya Seva Medal	Special Service Medal	Operation Vijay Medal	Operation Parakram Medal
Sainya Seva Medal	High Altitude Service Medal	Videsh Seva Medal	50th Anniversary of Independence Medal
30 Years Long Service Medal	20 Years Long Service Medal	9 Years Long Service Medal	MONUA

Military offices
Preceded by Devraj Anbu	General Officer Commanding IV Corps; 25 November 2016 – 29 December 2017	Succeeded by Gurpal Singh Sangha
Preceded by	General Officer Commanding, Bengal Area	Succeeded by
