= Manpreet Singh (soldier) =

Indian Army officer (1982 – 2023)

Colonel Manpreet Singh KC, SM
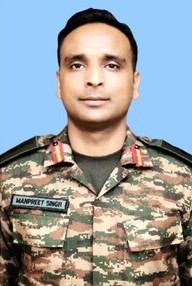
- Portrait of Col. Manpreet Singh
- Born: 11 March 1982; Amritsar, Punjab
- Died: 13 September 2023 (aged 41); Anantnag, Jammu and Kashmir
- Alma mater: Indian Military Academy
- Military career
- Allegiance: India
- Branch: Indian Army
- Service years: 2005 – 2023
- Rank: Colonel
- Service number: IC-67028M
- Units: 12 SIKH LI; 19 RR
- Commands: 19 RR
- Conflicts: Kashmir conflict; Insurgency in Jammu and Kashmir; 2023 Anantnag encounter †
- Awards: Kirti Chakra; Sena Medal (Gallantry)

Colonel Manpreet Singh KC, SM (11 March 1982 - 13 September 2023) was a decorated officer of the Indian Army who was killed in action during an operation in Anantnag with three other security personnel. For his bravery in the action, he was conferred India's second highest peacetime gallantry award the Kirti Chakra posthumously. He had also been awarded the Sena Medal for gallantry previously.

== Early life ==
Singh was born in 1982 in Amritsar, Punjab. He was a resident of village Bharonjian located in the Mohali district of Punjab. He was the son of Late Naik Lakhmeer Singh and Smt. Manjeet Kaur. His grandfather Sheetal Singh and uncle Ranjit Singh had also served in the Indian Army. He had a brother Sandeep Singh and sister Sandeep Kaur. He did his schooling at the Kendriya Vidyalaya in Mullanpur, Punjab. He completed his graduation at SD College in Chandigarh, where he pursued a B. Com degree. Thereafter he got a degree in Chartered Accountancy. He worked as a chartered accountant for a few years. Then, he successfully cleared the Combined Defence Services (CDS) examination in 2004 and joined the Army.

== Military career ==
He passed out from the Indian Military Academy, located in Dehradun, and was commissioned as a Lieutenant in 2005. He was commissioned into the 12 Sikh Light Infantry unit of the Indian Army. Later he was deputed to serve with the 19 Rashtriya Rifles Battalion, deployed in the state of Jammu and Kashmir for counter-insurgency operations. He served as the Second in Command (2IC) from 2019 to 2021 with 19 RR, and later became the Commanding Officer.

=== Anantnag operation ===
During 2023, 19 RR was deployed in the Anantnag district of Jammu and Kashmir for counterinsurgency operations. In the span of 5 years, Lt Col Manpreet Singh had taken part in numerous operations and was decorated with the Sena Medal for gallantry in 2021. On 13 Sep 2023, the security forces received information from the intelligence services about the presence of some hardcore terrorists in the dense forests surrounding Gadool village of Kokernag in South Kashmir's Anantnag district. A joint team of 19 RR and Jammu and Kashmir Police was dispatched to that location on the same night. When the team arrived, the hidden terrorists initiated heavy gun fire to cover their escape. Singh was commanding the operation and ordered his soldiers to start firing. A fierce gun battle was going on. In the operation Col. Manpreet Singh, Major Aashish Dhonchak, Sepoy Pradeep Singh from 19 RR and DSP Himayun Bhat from Jammu and Kashmir Police were killed in action. For Singh's bravery, legacy and leadership, he was posthumously awarded India's second highest peacetime gallantry award, the Kirti Chakra, on 15 August 2024. DSP Himayun Bhat was also awarded the Kirti Chakra posthumously for his bravery, while Major Aashish Dhonchak and Sepoy Pradeep Singh were awarded with the third highest peacetime gallantry award the Shaurya Chakra posthumously. In one single operation, 2 Kirti Chakras and 2 Shaurya Chakras were posthumously awarded to the fallen soldiers.

== Kirti Chakra Citation ==
The Kirti Chakra citation on the Official Indian Army Website reads as follows:

CITATION

COLONEL MANPREET SINGH, SENA MEDAL (POSTHUMOUS)
IC-67028M, THE SIKH LIGHT INFANTRY/ 19TH BATTALION THE RASHTRIYA RIFLES
(Effective date of the award: 13 September, 2023)

"On 13 September 2023, Colonel Manpreet Singh, Sena Medal was heading a specific search and destroy operation in densely forested hills of a village in Anantnag District. As the terrorist hideout was located and identified, terrorists opened indiscriminate fire in a bid to escape. Colonel Manpreet Singh, Sena Medal unmindful of his own safety, returned fire towards the escaping terrorists resulting in killing of one terrorist. Displaying extraordinary leadership the officer quickly reorganised the party to plug the escape routes. He continued to direct fire on the terrorists. However, in the ensuing gunfight Colonel Manpreet Singh, Sena Medal sustained severe Gun Shot Wound on the Forehead. Colonel Manpreet Singh, Sena Medal displayed raw courage and unparallel leadership by leading from the front. His undaunting valour and quick decision making led to the elimination of one terrorist and preventing escape of other terrorists. The neutralized terrorist was later identified as affiliated to a proscribed terrorist group. For displaying conspicuous bravery, raw courage, exemplary leadership and excellent tactical acumen with sheer disregard to

his own safety, Colonel Manpreet Singh, Sena Medal is awarded with “KIRTI CHAKRA (POSTHUMOUS)”."

== Personal life ==
Singh married Ms Jagmeet Kaur in 2016. They have a son, Kabir Singh, and a daughter, Vani.
