= Dalbir Singh Suhag =

26th Chief of the Army Staff (India)

General Dalbir Singh Suhag PVSM UYSM AVSM VSM ADC
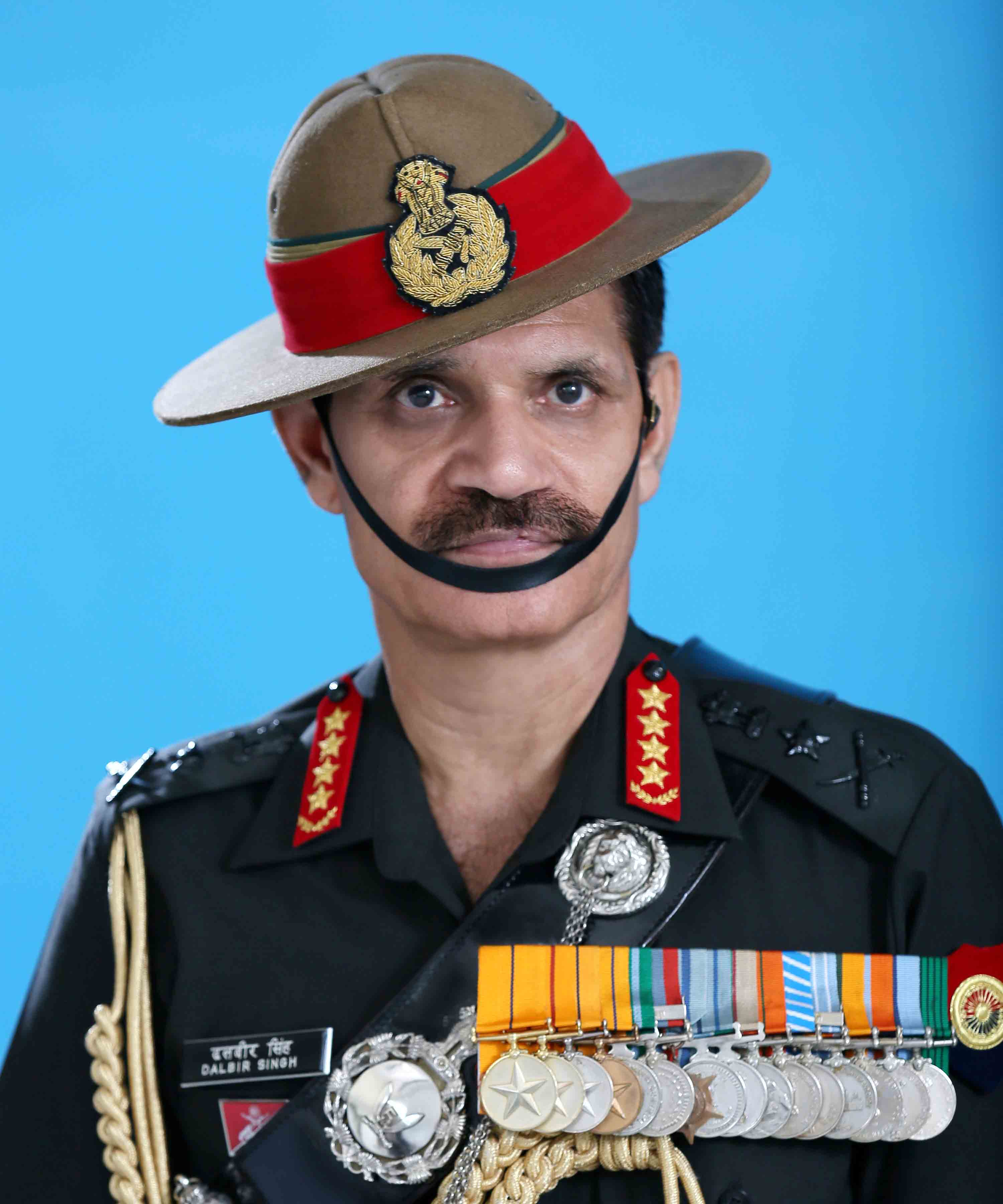

Indian High Commissioner to Seychelles
- In office 25 April 2019 – 22 September 2022
- President: Ram Nath Kovind
- Prime Minister: Narendra Modi
- Preceded by: Ausaf Sayeed
- Succeeded by: Kartik Pande

26th Chief of the Army Staff
- In office 31 July 2014 – 31 December 2016
- President: Pranab Mukherjee
- Prime Minister: Narendra Modi
- Preceded by: Bikram Singh
- Succeeded by: Bipin Rawat

Personal details
- Born: 28 December 1954 (age 71) Jhajjar, Haryana
- Spouse: Namita Suhag (m. 1984)
- Education: Sainik School, Chittorgarh; National Defence Academy; Indian Military Academy
- Awards: Param Vishisht Seva Medal; Uttam Yudh Seva Medal; Ati Vishisht Seva Medal; Vishisht Seva Medal; Commander of the Legion of Merit

Military service
- Allegiance: India
- Branch/service: Indian Army
- Years of service: 16 June 1974 – 31 December 2016
- Rank: General
- Unit: 4/5 Gorkha Rifles
- Commands: Eastern Command; III Corps; 8 Mountain Division; Special Frontier Force; 53 Infantry Brigade; 33 Rashtriya Rifles
- Battles/wars: Operation Pawan; Operation Vijay; Operation Parakram

General Dalbir Singh Suhag, PVSM, UYSM, AVSM, VSM, ADC (born 28 December 1954) is a former Indian High Commissioner to Seychelles and a former Chief of the Army Staff (COAS) of the Indian Army. He was the 26th COAS of the Indian Army, serving from 31 July 2014 to 31 December 2016, and Vice Chief of the Army Staff prior to that.

== Early life and education ==
Singh, born on 28 December 1954, is a third-generation soldier, son of Ishari Devi and Ch Ramphal Singh, a Risaldar-major in the 18th Cavalry Regiment of the Indian Army. He is from Bishan village of Jhajjar district, Haryana, India. He is regarded as the first Jat Chief of Army Staff.

Singh completed his primary education in his native village and then moved to Sainik School, Chittorgarh, Rajasthan for his secondary education in 1965 before joining the National Defence Academy in 1970. He holds master's degrees in Management Studies and Strategic Studies and has also completed the Executive Course offered by the Asia-Pacific Center for Security Studies in Hawaii as well as the Senior Mission Leaders Course of the United Nations Peace Keeping Centre in Nairobi.

== Military career ==
Singh was commissioned into the 4th battalion of the 5 Gorkha Rifles on 16 June 1974. He was an instructor at the Indian Military Academy, Dehradun after which he served as a company commander during Operation Pawan in Jaffna, Sri Lanka. He commanded 33 Rashtriya Rifles in Nagaland. He then commanded the 53 Infantry Brigade, which was involved in counter-insurgency operations in the Kashmir Valley from July 2003 to March 2005, and the 8th Mountain Division in Kargil from October 2007 to December 2008. He was also appointed the Inspector General of the Special Frontier Force.

Singh has completed various Indian and foreign courses including LDMC at College of Defence Management in 1997–98, National Defence College in 2006, Executive Course in USA in 2005 and Senior Mission Leaders Course (UN) in Kenya in 2007.

=== General Officer Commanding III Corps ===
Singh took command of the III Corps, headquartered in Dimapur, in northeast Indian state of Nagaland. In 2012, he was put under a 'Discipline and Vigilance' ban by the then outgoing Army Chief General V K Singh. Singh's unit had allegedly botched a military intelligence operation in Jorhat, Assam, which happened during his tenure as the III Corps commander. The 'Discipline and Vigilance' ban was, however, subsequently revoked by the next army chief General Bikram Singh with the concurrence of Minister of Defence A K Antony.

=== General Officer Commanding-in-Chief Eastern Command ===
After promotion to Army Commander grade, he took over as the General Officer-Commanding-in-Chief (GOC-in-C) Eastern Army based in Kolkata on 16 June 2012 and served in that capacity until 31 December 2013.

=== Vice Chief of the Army staff ===
Singh replaced Lt Gen Sri Krishna Singh as the Vice Chief of Army staff (VCOAS) on 31 December 2013. He held this post until 30 July 2014.

=== Chief of the Army staff ===
On 14 May 2014, Government of India announced its decision to appoint Singh as next Chief of the Army staff. His name was recommended by the Defence Ministry of India to the Appointments Committee of Cabinet (ACC) which was headed by then Prime Minister Manmohan Singh. He assumed charge as Chief of the Army staff on 31 July 2014 following the retirement of General Bikram Singh, and served in that capacity until 31 December 2016. He is the second officer from the Gorkha Rifles to become the Chief of the Army, after the late Field Marshal Sam Manekshaw.

==== Row over appointment ====
On 7 July 2014, the Supreme Court of India declined to stay or stall Singh's appointment as next Army Chief, in response to a petition filed by Lt Gen Ravi Dastane challenging his appointment as Eastern Army Commander. The Bench observed that there is no reason and urgency to stay the appointment and that the petition pertained to Singh's appointment as army commander and hence issues relating to appointment of army chief did not have to be dealt with at this stage. Attorney General Mukul Rohatgi representing the Government of India, also justified the appointment, arguing that there was nothing in the allegations levelled and that Singh fulfilled all the criteria for the post including being senior-most in the seniority list. He also said that the ban imposed on Singh in 2012 had been lifted and he had been discharged from all charges. Earlier on 10 June 2014, the central government had told the Supreme Court that the alleged lapses which were made as grounds to impose disciplinary ban on Army Vice Chief Dalbir Singh by then Army Chief V K Singh, were "premeditated", "vague" and "illegal".

== Honours and decorations ==
=== Military awards ===

Param Vishisht Seva Medal	Uttam Yudh Seva Medal	Ati Vishisht Seva Medal	Vishisht Seva Medal
Samanya Seva Medal	Special Service Medal	Operation Vijay Star	Operation Vijay Medal
Operation Parakram Medal	Sainya Seva Medal	High Altitude Service Medal	Videsh Seva Medal
50th Anniversary of Independence Medal	30 Years Long Service Medal	20 Years Long Service Medal	9 Years Long Service Medal

General Suhag has received the following medals and decorations throughout his military career:

- Param Vishisht Seva Medal for services of exceptionally high order to the nation.
- Uttam Yudh Seva Medal for counter-insurgency operations in the North-Eastern states in addition to the conventional operational role along the Indo-China border.
- Ati Vishisht Seva Medal for commanding Mountain Division in the Kargil-Dras sector at high altitude near Line of Control.
- Vishisht Seva Medal for intense counter-insurgency operations in the Kashmir valley.
- Legion of Merit (Degree of Commander) for exceptionally meritorious service as CoAS of the Indian Army.

== Dates of rank ==
Insignia	Rank	Component	Date of rank
	Second Lieutenant	Indian Army	16 June 1974
	Lieutenant	Indian Army	16 June 1976
	Captain	Indian Army	16 June 1980
	Major	Indian Army	16 June 1985
	Lieutenant-Colonel	Indian Army	30 December 1994
	Colonel	Indian Army	1 July 1997
	Brigadier	Indian Army	1 August 2004
	Major General	Indian Army	1 February 2008 (seniority from 2 July 2007)
	Lieutenant-General	Indian Army	19 July 2010
	General (COAS)	Indian Army	1 August 2014

== Personal life ==
Singh is married to Namita Suhag. She is a graduate from Delhi University with a degree in political science. The couple have three children, two daughters and a son. Known as a sportsperson, he takes special interest in physical activities like riding and swimming. His personal hobbies include daily run of 10 km, horse-riding and playing golf.

== In popular culture ==
The character of General Arjun Singh in the 2019 movie Uri: The Surgical Strike played by Shishir Sharma is based on General Dalbir Singh Suhag.

== See also ==
- Chief of the Army Staff (India)

Diplomatic posts
Preceded by Ausaf Sayeed	Indian High Commissioner to Seychelles; 25 April 2019 - 22 September 2022	Succeeded by Kartik Pande
Military offices
Preceded by Bikram Singh	Chief of Army Staff; 1 August 2014 – 31 December 2016	Succeeded by Bipin Rawat
Preceded by S K Singh	Vice Chief of Army Staff; 1 January 2014 – 31 July 2014	Succeeded by Philip Campose
Preceded by Bikram Singh	General Officer-Commanding-in-Chief Eastern Command; 16 June 2012 – 31 December 2013	Succeeded by M M S Rai
Preceded by	General Officer Commanding III Corps	Succeeded by
