= Neduvathoor =

- village
- Location in Kerala, India Neduvathoor (India)
- Coordinates: 8°59′35″N 76°45′0″E
- Country: India
- State: Kerala
- District: Kollam

Government
  - Type: Panchayati raj (India)
  - Body: Gram panchayat

Population (2011)
  - Total: 24,749

Languages
  - Official: Malayalam, English
- Time zone: UTC+5:30 (IST)
- Vehicle registration: KL-02
- Nearest city: Kollam City (25 km)

Neduvathoor is a village in Kollam district in the state of Kerala, India.

== Demographics ==
As of 2011 India census, Neduvathoor had a population of 24749 with 11768 males and 12981 females.
