= Bobby Mathews (general) =

Lieutenant General Bobby Mathews PVSM, AVSM & Bar, VSM
- Military career
- Allegiance: India
- Branch: Indian Army
- Rank: Lieutenant General
- Unit: 2 Kumaon
- Commands: XII Corps; 2 Kumaon
- Awards: Param Vishisht Seva Medal Ati Vishisht Seva Medal & Bar VSM

Lieutenant General Bobby Mathews, PVSM, AVSM & Bar, VSM is an Indian Army officer who is an alumnus of the prestigious National Defence Academy, Khadakwasla. He is a second generation army officer and has been General Officer Commanding of the Konark Corps (XII Corps), India's only Desert Corps. The General holds a MSc & MPhil Degree from Madras University.

== Military career ==
The General Officer was commissioned on 16 December 1978 into 2 KUMAON (The Kumaon Regiment), one of the oldest and most decorated regiments of the Indian Army. He commanded his Battalion 2 KUMAON (BERAR) in Counter-insurgency Operations in Manipur. He went on to command a Mountain Brigade and the Striking Lion Mountain Division in the Eastern Theatre, during which he was responsible for coordinating relief and reconstruction work during the 2011 Sikkim earthquake. He was also the Sub Area Commander, Mumbai Region during the 2008 Mumbai terror attacks. He took over as the General Officer Commanding of India's only Desert Corps XII Corps in September 2014.

Lt Gen Bobby Mathews has been an Instructor at the IMA, Dehradun, Infantry School, Mhow, The Defence Services Staff College Wellington, and Dy Comdt & Chief Instructor at the Indian Military Academy, Dehradun. He has also been BM of a Mtn Bde & Col GS of an Inf Division. The General Officer has also attended the Higher Command (Air) Course and the prestigious National Defence College Course, National Defence College (India) at New Delhi. Prior to taking over as the GOC of the Konark Corps, he handled the critical appointment of Additional Director General Public Info (Media Advisor to COAS) in the Army Headquarters. The General took over as The Colonel of Kumaon & Naga Regiments & Kumaon Scouts on 1 May 2015. The General took over as Commandant Officers Training Academy Chennai on 18 Oct 2015. He retired from the Army on 28 February 2017.

The General was appointed by the Govt of India as Member of the Armed Forces Tribunal in 2020.

== Family ==
Bobby Mathews is married to Lina Mathews. The couple had a son Rohit, who died in a car accident near Surat on 7 December 2014. Rohit held a master's degree in Steel Technology from IIT Bombay and was working with Essar Steel, Hazira the time of his death. The couple are the parents of twins, a boy Rihaan & a girl Riyanna born 19 July 2016.
