= Sikh Light Infantry =

Infantry regiment of the Indian Army

- Sikh Light Infantry Insignia
- Active: 1941 - Present
- Country: British India (1941–1947); India (1947–present)
- Branch: British Indian Army (1941–1947); Indian Army (1947–present)
- Type: Light infantry
- Role: Infantry
- Size: 19 battalions
- Regimental Centre: Fatehgarh, Uttar Pradesh
- Motto: Deg Tegh Fateh
- Decorations: 1 Ashok Chakra; 5 Maha Vir Chakra; 10 Kirti Chakra; 23 Vir Chakra; 13 Shaurya Chakra; 82 Sena Medal; 4 Param Vishisht Seva Medals; 8 Ati Vishisht Seva Medals; 3 Yudh Seva Medals; 17 Vishisht Seva Medals; 49 Mention-in-Despatches; 122 COAS's Commendation Cards.

Commanders
- Colonel of the Regiment: Lt Gen Rashim Bali
- Notable commanders: General V.P. Malik; General Bikram Singh; General Manoj Mukund Naravane

Insignia
- War Cry: Bole So Nihal, Sat Sri Akaal!

The Sikh Light Infantry is a light infantry regiment of the Indian Army. The regiment is the successor unit to the Sikh Pioneer regiments of the British Indian Army and recruits from the Ramdasia and Mazhabi Sikh communities of Punjab and the adjoining states of Himachal Pradesh and Haryana.

The Sikh Light Infantry has demonstrated versatility across a wide spectrum of operations - from World War II to conventional warfare on the plains of the Indian subcontinent, to deployment in the highest battlefield in the world - Siachen Glacier. The regiment has also actively participated in counter-terrorism operations and been deployed in overseas operations in Sri Lanka and as part of the United Nations.

== History ==
The Sikh Light Infantry's predecessors, the 23rd, 32nd Sikh Pioneers and 34th Royal Sikh Pioneers of the British Indian Army, could all trace their origins to 1857. The 23rd Sikh Pioneers were raised as 15th (Pioneer) Regiment of Punjab Infantry and although they were pioneers by name, they functioned as a regular infantry regiment specially trained as assault pioneers. They served during the Second Opium War, the expedition to Abyssinia, the Second Anglo-Afghan War, the expedition to Tibet, and the First World War. The 32nd Sikh Pioneers and the 34th Royal Sikh Pioneers were raised as Punjab Sappers in 1857. They fought in the Indian Rebellion of 1857, the Second Anglo-Afghan War and the First World War. In 1922, the army was reformed from single battalion regiments to multi-battalion regiments, and the 23rd, 32nd and 34th Sikh Pioneers were amalgamated into the 3rd Sikh Pioneers. They were renamed in 1929 to the Corps of Sikh Pioneers. The Sikh Pioneers were recruited from the Ramdasia and Mazhabi Sikh communities, who were historically marginalised, and were not recruited by the other Sikh regiments because of considerations of caste.

The Pioneer Regiments of the British Indian Army were disbanded in 1932-3. While some of the troops were absorbed to the Sapper and Miner Regiments, many soldiers were demobilised and returned to their villages. From the Sikh Pioneers, those affected were the Lobana, Ramdasia and Mazhabi Sikhs. Over time, some were eventually absorbed to the Bombay Sappers and Miners, with the Lobana Sikhs subsequently being moved to the Indian Machine Gun platoons of British Infantry regiments.

However, the dissolution of the Pioneer Regiments created significant hardship, particularly for the Ramdasia and Mazhbi Sikhs, who were left with few opportunities for military service. Despite their bravery and endurance in the Pioneer regiments, they seemed to have been unjustly penalised. A number of former British Pioneers officers, who were now in senior positions, were aware of this unfair situation and suggested that as a 'martial class' these men should once again be afforded the opportunity to serve. Thus during the Second World War, the regiment was re-raised as the Mazhabi and Ramdasia Sikh Light Infantry, with the first battalion being raised on 1 October 1941. The regiment inherited the seniority, battle honours, colours and traditions of the 23rd Sikh Pioneers.

The second and third battalions were raised in 1942. The 25th Garrison Battalion was raised at Poona in about August 1942, and sent to the Middle East. It returned to the Regimental Centre at Lahore and was disbanded in April 1946. The 26th Garrison Battalion was raised at Aurangabad, employed on escort and protection duties on the railway from Bombay to Poona and was disbanded in May 1946 at Lahore. 35th and 37th Labour/Garrison Companies were sent to the Middle East in 1940, returned to Lahore in October 1945 and was disbanded in February 1946. 3 Garrison Company went to Burma, the Cocos Islands and returned to Lahore in May 1946 for disbandment.

The regiment's name was found uninspiring and was not very popular. The Commander-in-Chief, General Sir Claude Auchinleck, tasked the Director General of Infantry, Major General Reginald Savory to find a suitable name for the Regiment. A committee at Army headquarters, looked at alternatives like the Sikh Fusiliers, the Sikh Rifles and the Sikh Grenadiers, finally chose the Sikh Light Infantry. The name was by Royal proclamation changed on 23 June 1944 to the Sikh Light Infantry. After Indian independence, the Sikh Light Infantry was allotted to the newly formed Indian Army.

== Operations ==
World War II (Burma)

The 1st battalion under the command of Lieutenant Colonel WH Barlow-Wheeler moved from Ranchi to the Imphal Plain in January 1945. It fought under 99 Infantry Brigade of 17 Indian Division. It took part in the defence of Meiktila, battle for Pyawbwe and the dash towards Rangoon.

In these five months of intense action, the unit earned the battle honours of ‘Defence of Meiktila’, ‘Rangoon Road’, ‘Pyawbwe’, and ‘Sittang 1945’. It was also awarded the theatre honour of ‘Burma 1942-45’. The battalion lost five officers, six VCOs and 86 Other Ranks during these operations. 1 Sikh LI earned two Distinguished Service Order, one Indian Order of Merit, four Military Cross, three Indian Distinguished Service Medal, seven Military Medals, seven Mention-in-Despatches and four Certificates of Gallantry during their time in Burma.

Middle East

The 2nd battalion under the command of Lieutenant Colonel GRF Jenney were deployed in Deir ez-Zor in Syria between October 1945 and January 1946. They were part of 24 Indian Infantry Brigade tasked for internal security duties under the French. The unit moved to Lattakia between January and April 1946 and then to Shaibah, Az Zubeir, in Iraq between April 1946 and May /June 1947. In Shaibah, the unit was tasked to guard the Base Ammunition Depot. With independence nearing, an effort was made to move as many as possible of the Indian Units serving overseas back in the country. 2nd battalion sailed from Maqil and reached Bombay on 10 August 1947.

Post independence

The 1st battalion moved from Jalandhar in January 1948 to fight in the Jammu and Kashmir theatre. The 2nd battalion was part of the force which took part in the annexation of Junagadh, while the 3rd battalion was involved in the Police Action (Operation Polo) to annex the princely state of Hyderabad during September 1948.

Operation Vijay

During the 1961 annexation of Goa, three battalions of the Sikh Light Infantry took part. 1 Sikh LI under Lieutenant Colonel Munshi Singh Brar was with the reserve 48 Infantry Brigade of 17 Infantry Division. 2 Sikh LI was under Lieutenant Colonel Thomas Cherian and operated under 50th Parachute Brigade. It took the Dodamarg-Assonora-Tivim-Betim route, moved rapidly across minefields, roadblocks and four riverine obstacles and entered Panjim on 19 December 1961, being one of the first units (after 1 Para (Punjab)). 4 Sikh LI was under Lieutenant Colonel Raghbir Bahadur Nanda and was with the 63 Infantry Brigade of 17 Infantry Division. They marched on the Anmod-Ponda-Borim-Margao-Dabolim route. At the outskirts of Dabolim, the commanding officer was met by the Portuguese chief of staff - who conveyed that Governor General's decision to surrender. Meanwhile, a small force of the unit commanded by Major Earl William Carvalho reached the mess at Alparqueiros Hill in Vasco da Gama and got the Governor General Manuel António Vassalo e Silva to accept the surrender.

Sino-Indian War

During the 1962 war, 1st Battalion was placed at Bomdila, while the 2nd and 4th Battalions were deployed at Se La and Jang in North-East Frontier Agency. In the trying conditions of the war, the regiment lost 11 officers, 15 JCOs and 183 other ranks. 3rd battalion was deployed in Ladakh in October 1962.

India–Pakistan war of 1965

6 Sikh LI under Lieutenant Colonel PK Nandagopal was awarded the battle honour Kalidhar for its actions on 5 October 1965. This involved fierce fighting to recapture the strategically important Kalidhar feature (Trig point 3776) in Chhamb sector. The regiment lost two officers and 34 other ranks. It won one Maha Vir Chakras, two Vir Chakras, and four Sena Medals.

5 Sikh LI under Lieutenant Colonel Sant Singh took part in the battle of OP Hill in Naushera sector of Jammu and Kashmir on 2 November 1965. The mission to reclaim the strategically significant hill with well entrenched Pakistani soldiers was carried out under intense conditions with limited resources and an approach on a steep route. The unit captured four objectives in a single night. For its valour and a significant victory under heavy odds, the unit was awarded the battle honour OP Hill and theatre honour Jammu and Kashmir. It also won two Maha Vir Chakras, one Vir Chakra, four Sena Medals and three COAS commendation cards.

1 Sikh LI was part of 162 Infantry Brigade under 26 Infantry Division. It took part on the attack on the Pakistani post at Kundapur in Sialkot Sector, for which it won the theatre honour Sialkot.

India–Pakistan war of 1971

All ten battalions took part in the 1971 operations. 8 Sikh LI under Lieutenant Colonel HC Pathak was allotted the task of capturing the Fatehpur post and the surrounding Dussi Bunds occupied by Pakistan. The operation on the night of 11 December 1971 ended with the unit capturing its objectives, although at a cost of 46 lives. The unit was awarded the battle honour Fathepur and theatre honour Punjab for this heroic action, along with one Mahavir Chakra, five Vir Chakras, four Sena Medals and two Mention-in Despatches.

10 Sikh LI commanded by Lieutenant Colonel Basant Singh spearheaded the advance of 85 Infantry Brigade against the well-fortified Pakistani defences of Parbat Ali feature during its operation in the Sind desert. The unit began their rapid advance on 4 December 1971, capturing the key points of Kajlor and Khokhropar, followed by the decisive attack on 12-13 December, when the battalion successfully captured Parbat Ali. The battalion was awarded the battle honour Parbat Ali, three Vir Chakras, four Sena Medals and two Mention-in Despatches.

2 Sikh LI under Lieutenant Colonel ABC D'Mello was part of 42 Infantry Brigade in the Eastern front. On 6 December 1971, the battalion launched a heavy assault on Durgabarkati, which was held by the Pakistani 107 Infantry Brigade. The fall of Durgabarkati opened the gates to Jessore. The unit was awarded the sector honour Durgabarkati.

Counter insurgency operations

Units of the regiment have taken part in anti-terrorist operations in Jammu and Kashmir and the north-eastern states of India.

Indian Peace Keeping Force

4 units of the regiment were inducted in the Indian Peace Keeping Force in Sri Lanka between 1987 and 1990 - 1, 7, 13 and 14 Sikh LI. During Operation Pawan, the 13th battalion, Sikh Light Infantry were involved in the Jaffna University Helidrop on 12 October 1987, an operation that aimed to capture the LTTE leadership at their tactical headquarters in Jaffna University. The operation ended disastrously due to intelligence and planning failures. Delta Company, 13 Sikh LI, led by Major Birendra Singh, was the first company to be heli-dropped in. However, LTTE militants had intercepted Indian radio communications prior to the operation and had laid an ambush, hitting the helicopters with RPGs and .50 calibre machine gun rounds. Heavy damage to the helicopters meant that further drops were impossible and as a result, only 30 of the intended 360 Sikh LI troops made it to the university, including Major Birendra Singh and one of the platoon commanders, Subedar Samparan Singh. Completely surrounded, outnumbered, outgunned and with no support, the 30 troops from D Coy were progressively annihilated throughout the night. Major Birendra Singh and Subedar Samparan Singh were killed sometime in the morning, and by 11:30 am there were only 3 troops left. When they ran out of ammunition, they fixed bayonets and charged. 2 of them were killed by LTTE fire and the third, Sepoy Gora Singh, was taken prisoner. In total, 29 out of the 30 troops from D Coy who landed were killed.

When reinforcements reached the university after a week of heavy fighting, they found the battlefield littered with pieces of Sikh LI uniforms and equipment, along with thousands of .50 BMG shells. According to Sepoy Gora Singh, the dead Sikhs were stripped of their weapons, uniforms and equipment and their bare bodies were laid out in a row at the nearby Buddhist Nagaraja Vihar temple. The corpses were then burnt with a barrel of oil. The LTTE claimed to have tried to get in touch with the IPKF HQ at Palali, but apparently their efforts to get them collect the dead bodies were in vain. The bodies had started to decompose, and they had no option but to cremate them. Jaffna University was eventually captured on 24 October 1987.

United Nations

- 1 Sikh LI - Gaza (1967)
- 15 Sikh LI - United Nations Mission in Ethiopia and Eritrea (2003-4)
- 9 Sikh LI - United Nations Interim Force in Lebanon (2013-14)

== Regimental Centre ==
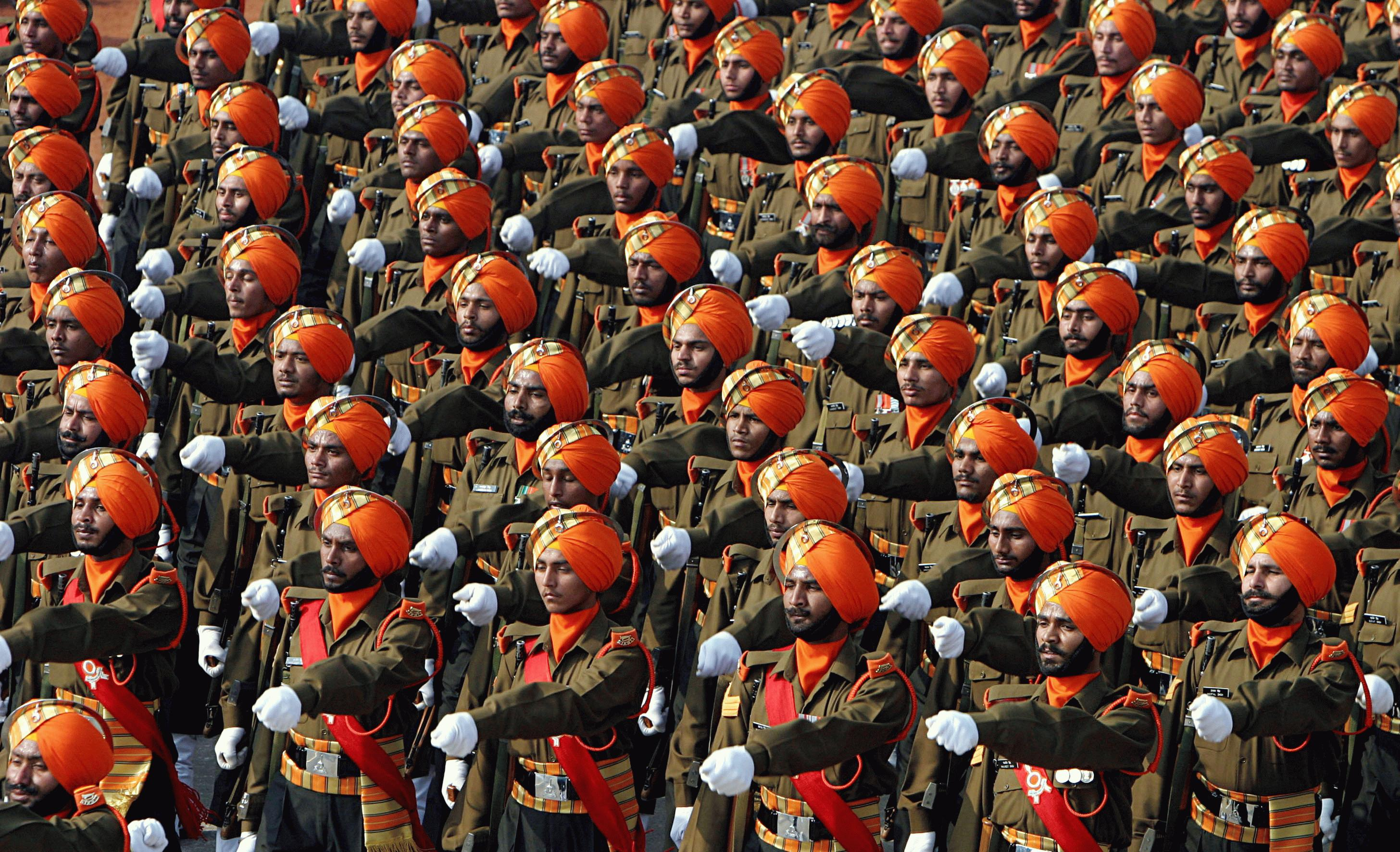
Sikh Light Infantry soldiers march past during a Republic Day Parade in New Delhi, India

The Sikh Light Infantry Regimental Centre is located at Fatehgarh in Farrukhabad district of Uttar Pradesh. During the early years, training of all recruits had to be carried out by the various battalions of the Regiment themselves. A Training Battalion under Lieutenant Colonel P White (of the erstwhile 34th Royal Sikh Pioneers) was set up as part of the 9th Jat Regimental Centre at Bareilly. In September 1943, Honorary Lieutenant Sohan Singh, (who had served with 32 Sikh Pioneers) had been re-employed and was appointed Subedar Major of the Training Battalion. The Centre also took over the Sikh Pioneers Records and the Sikh Pioneers Charitable Fund from the Sappers and Miners. The training battalion moved to the old Cavalry Lines Lahore on 15 October 1945 and was designated the 'Sikh L. I. Regimental Centre'. During this time, the 127 Garrison Training Company at Bareilly, was charged with recruiting and training for the Garrison Battalions (25th and 26th) and the Garrison Companies (1st, 2nd and 3rd).

127 Garrison Training Company was absorbed into the Training Battalion in September 1945 and ceased to exist in March 1946. The centre moved to Ferozepur on 26 September 1947. Following the 1951 orders for the amalgamation of various regimental centres, the centre moved to Meerut on 15 September 1951. For the next twelve years, it was amalgamated with the Punjab Regimental Centre and was known as The Punjab and Sikh Light Infantry Regimental Centre. On 1 April 1963, the Sikh Light Infantry Regimental Centre reverted to its original status for another thirteen years with lines of its own, before the final move in 1976 to Fatehgarh. The centre was finally established at its present location in Fatehgarh on 7 May 1976.

== Regimental Insignia and Traditions ==
Regimental Crest

The regiment's crest is a throwing quoit or the chakram used by the Sikhs in combat, mounted with a kirpan - the Sikh dagger. The insignia was designed to honour the Khalsa community's Akali Nihang ancestry.

Regimental flag

The Regimental flag of the 32nd Sikh Pioneers was adopted for the Sikh Light Infantry. It is dark blue, red and old gold with the Regimental Crest in the centre of the flag.

Regimental motto and war cry

The regimental motto is "Deg Tegh Fateh", meaning "prosperity in peace and victory in war". The motto has great significance from the tenth Sikh Guru, Guru Gobind Singh, with whom the Sikh community is attached beliefs, Guru Gobind Singh named them Khalsa as in faithful for their dedication to do good. The war cry of the regiment is "Jo Bole So Nihal Sat Sri Akal" ("Whoever utters, shall be fulfilled, True is the Great Timeless One!").

Uniform

Lieutenant General Premindra Singh Bhagat (the Colonel of the Regiment from 1966) observed that the uniform of the regiment was rather drab and dull and was keen on infusing some colour to the uniform. Inspired by flame of the forest trees in full bloom during a drive, he added two colours to the uniform - the reddish-orange ‘flame of the forest’, ‘bunting yellow’ and the war bugle symbol. The regular uniform consists of a dark green turban, bunting yellow coloured fiftiyan (or fifty), reddish-orange lanyard on the left shoulder and the curved shoulder title SIKHLI (brass letters over reddish-orange background) mounted by a war bugle. When a green beret is used instead of a turban, the regimental crest is mounted on an upright yellow triangle.

== Units ==
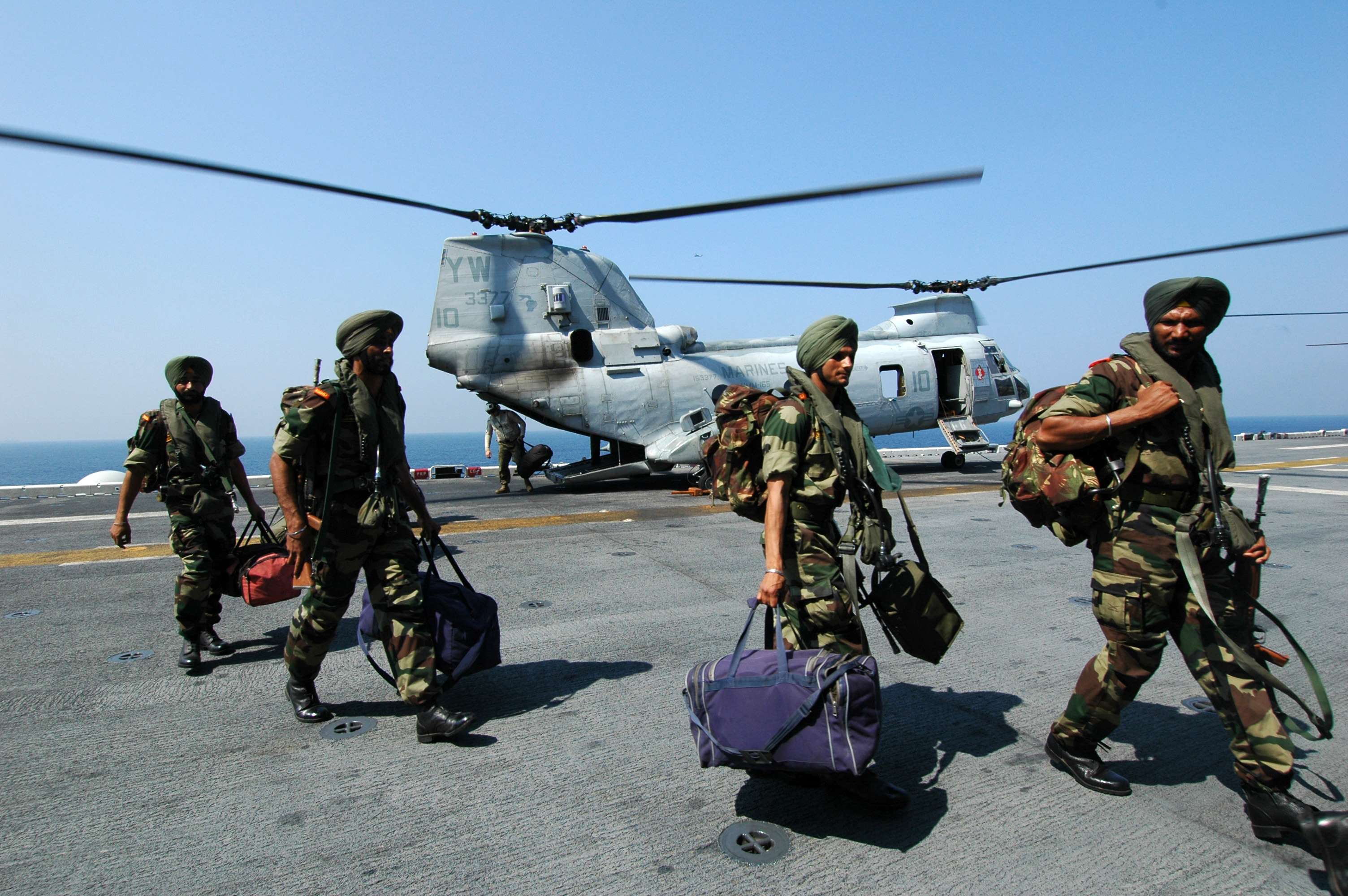
Troops from the 9th battalion, Sikh Light Infantry arrive aboard USS Boxer (LHD 4) to participate in Malabar 2006. Malabar 2006 is a multinational exercise between the U.S., Indian and Canadian armed forces to increase interoperability between the three nations and support international security cooperation missions

The Sikh Light Infantry consists of nineteen regular battalions, one Bhairav Battalion, three Territorial Army units and three Rashtriya Rifles battalions -

Battalion	Raising Date	Remarks	References
1st Battalion	1 October 1941	Raised at Jullundur (presently Jalandhar) by Lieutenant Colonel CH Price.	
2nd Battalion	1 July 1942	Raised at Peshawar by Lieutenant Colonel TM Ker.	
3rd Battalion	15 August 1942	Raised at Sialkot by converting 13 Pioneer Battalion, Indian Engineer Group. The first commanding officer was Lieutenant Colonel EPF Pearse.	
4th Battalion	12 July 1948	Raised at Ferozepore.	
5th Battalion		Battle honour OP Hill and theatre honour Jammu and Kashmir 1965.	
6th Battalion	1 October1963	Raised by Lieutenant Colonel PK Nandgopal, at Meerut. Battle honour Kalidhar and theatre honour J&K, 1965.	
7th Battalion	1 April 1964	Raised at Wavell Lines, Meerut.	
8th Battalion	1 June 1966	Raised at Meerut under Lieutenant Colonel Labh Singh Gill. The regimental nucleus then moved to Dhana to complete its raising. Battle Honour Fatehpur and Theatre Honour Punjab, 1971.	
9th Battalion	1 October 1966	Raised at Golconda Fort under Lieutenant Colonel FC Smith.	
10th Battalion			
11th Battalion			
12nd Battalion	1974		
13th Battalion	1 July 1979		
14th Battalion	1 July 1979		
15th Battalion	1 May 1982		
16th Battalion	26 June 1987		
17th Battalion			
18th Battalion			
19th Battalion	1 October 1966	Raised at Secunderabad under Lieutenant Colonel Bhagat Singh.	
4 Bhairav Battalion	2025		
103 Infantry Battalion (TA)	1 January 1968	Initially affiliated to Sikh Regiment; it came into the folds of Sikh Light Infantry on 1 April 1979. Based at Ludhiana, Punjab.	
158 Infantry Battalion (TA) (H&H)		Based at Janglot, Jammu & Kashmir.	
163 Infantry Battalion TA (H&H)	2004	Based at Hyderbeigh, Jammu & Kashmir.	
2 Rashtriya Rifles			
19 Rashtriya Rifles			
49 Rashtriya Rifles			

== Affiliations ==
- INS Teg, a Talwar-class frigate of the Indian Navy was affiliated with the Sikh Light Infantry Regiment in June 2013.
- 17 Squadron of the Indian Air Force was affiliated with the Sikh Light Infantry Regiment on 4 October 2021. The Indian Army Chief - General MM Naravane and Air Commodore Tarun Chaudhry of 17 Squadron signed the charter of affiliation.

== Culture ==
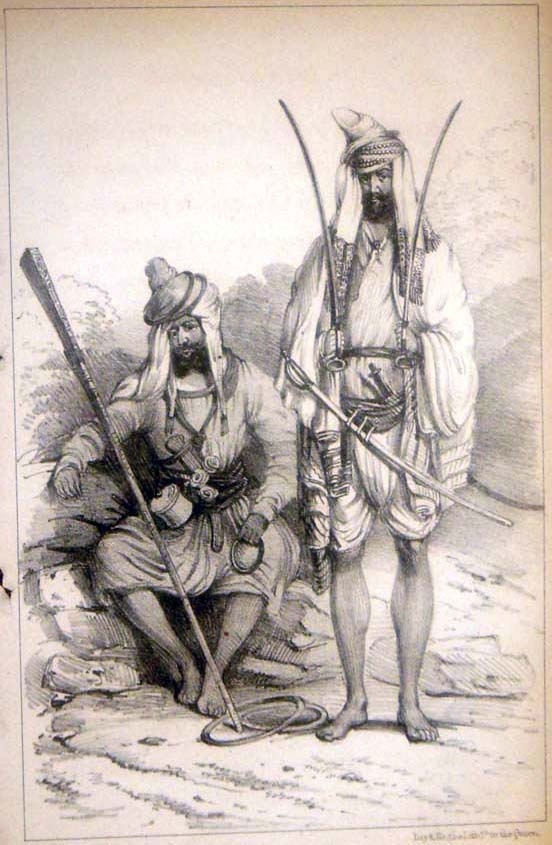
Akali Nihangs

The chakram and kirpan are traditional and iconic weapons of the Akali Nihang order, a religious warrior monk order started by Guru Gobind Singh in the 18th century. The Mazhabi Sikhs dominated this order throughout the 18th and 19th centuries. The chakram and kirpan were thus combined to make the Sikh Light Infantry cap badge.

Due to the cultural origin of its recruits, the regiment maintains not only a strong Sikh culture but a strong Punjabi culture. Bhangra, a popular folk dance of the Punjab, is a regular pastime of the soldiers. Sikhism plays a strong role in the day-to-day life and functioning of the regiment and its soldiers some of which have Chakrams on their turbans. The regiment maintains its own regimental gurdwara for the daily worship for its soldiers. The religious life of the soldiers sees them conduct shabad kirtan and all other aspects of Sikh worship. The teachings of Guru Gobind Singh and the notion of sant-sipahi ("saint-soldier") play a large role in regimental life. Historically, the Mazhabi Sikhs have long served in the armies of Guru Gobind Singh and in the later Khalsa Army raised by Ranjit Singh, which forged and established the Sikh Empire. Most times before entering battle Sikh soldiers said the Ardas and then went into battle. Before the Regiment was formed it was called the Rattray's Sikhs, who notably did not tie their beards and carried 3 foot long swords into battle.

The regimental motto, Deg Tegh Fateh is also derived from Guru Gobind Singh. It incorporates his teachings of peace, tolerance and community spirit, but also the duty to unsheathe the sword when a tyrant or oppressor threatens that ethos and refuses peaceful co-existence. The battle cry of the regiment is "Jo Bole So Nihal, Sat Sri Akal!".

== Recruitment ==
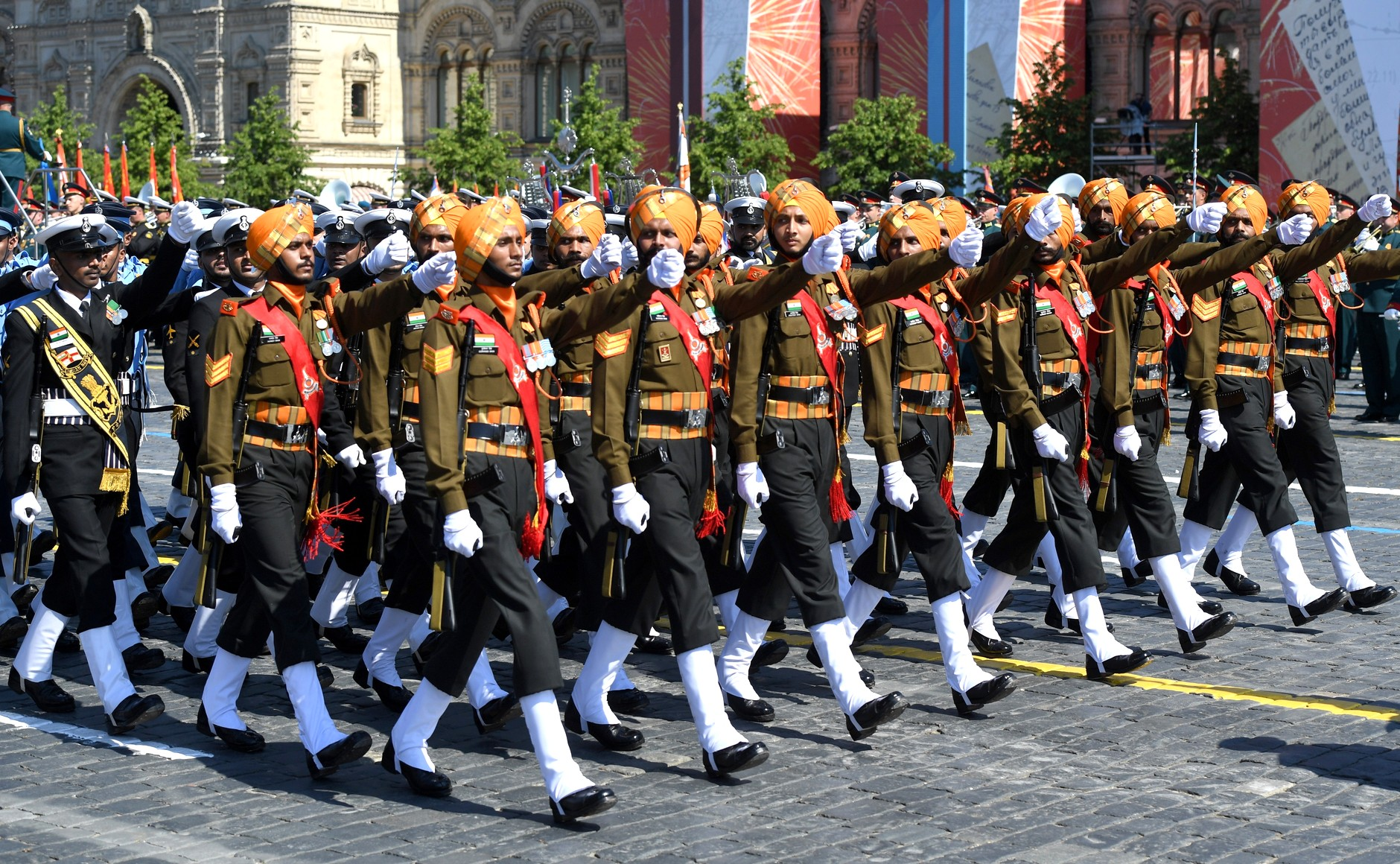
Members of the regiment on Red Square during the 2020 Moscow Victory Day Parade.

The Sikh Light Infantry is a "single caste" regiment. Its soldiers are recruited only from Mazhabi and Ramdasia Sikhs. Ramdasia Sikhs and Mazhabi Sikhs must provide identification certificates showing their status as Mazhabi Sikhs for eligibility to join the regiment as well as meeting the other minimum standards. Like all Indian Army regiments, officers can come from any of the regions and communities in India.

Under the Agnipath scheme, Agniveers are recruited into the Sikh Light Infantry for a four-year term of service. They undergo standard military training and are integrated into operational units alongside regular soldiers. After completing their term, a proportion may be selected for permanent induction into the regiment, while others are released in accordance with the scheme’s provisions.

Agniveer Kulveer Singh of the 7th Battalion, Sikh Light Infantry was awarded the Sena Medal (Gallantry) in January 2026, becoming the first Agniveer to receive the decoration, while on an operational assignment along the Line of Control.

== Awards and decorations (Pre-independence) ==
Battle honours

- Honours inherited by the regiment from the 1st Battalion, 23rd Sikh Pioneers - Taku Forts, Pekin 1860, Abyssinia, Peiwar Kotal, Charasia, Afghanistan 1878-79, Kabul 1879, Kandahar 1880, Chitral, Egypt 1916-17, Gaza, Megiddo, Sharon, Nablus, Aden, Palestine 1917-18.
- Battle honours earned by 1 Sikh LI during the Second World War - Defence of Meiktila, Rangoon Road, Pyawbwe, Sittang 1945

Theatre honour

- Burma 1942-45

Gallantry awards

- Distinguished Service Order (DSO) - Lieutenant Colonel WH Barlow-Wheeler and Major JD Maling, MC
- Indian Order of Merit (IOM) - Subedar Basant Singh
- Military Cross (MC) - Major DJ Ewert MC, Captain Ata Mohammed, Captain DJ Ewert, Subedar Major Bachan Singh, Subedar Mohinder Singh
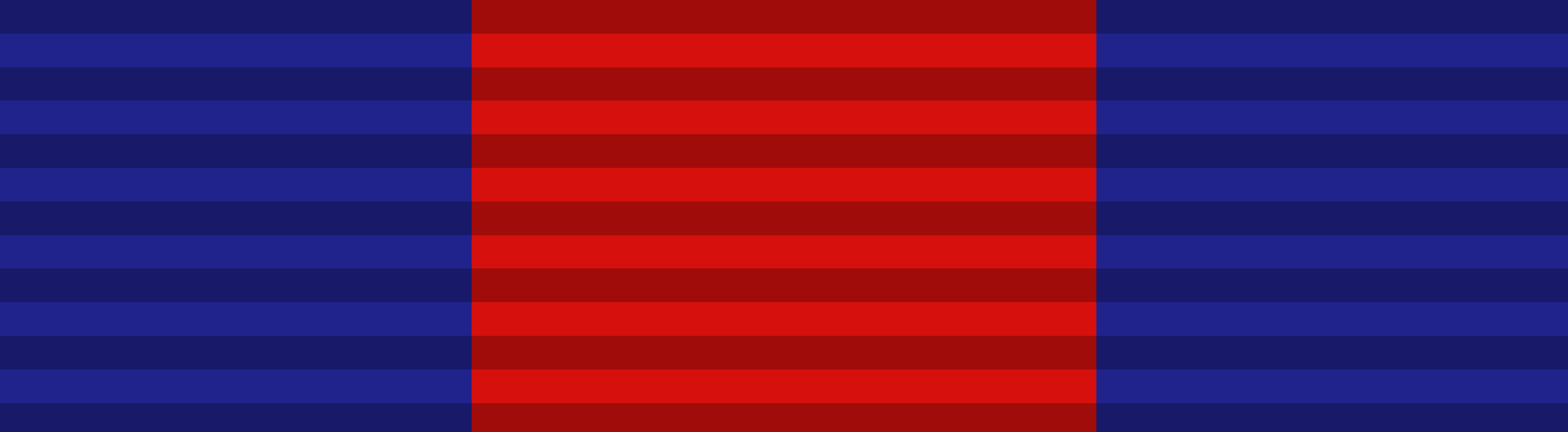
- Indian Distinguished Service Medal (IDSM) - Subedar Major Jiwan Singh, Havildar Char Singh and Sepoy Ginder Singh
- Military Medals (MMs) - Havildar Ajit Singh, Naik Inder Singh, Naik Ajmer Singh, Lance Naik Mota Singh, Lance Naik Banta Singh, Sepoy Joginder Singh, Sepoy Kundan Singh
- Order Of British India (1st Class) - Subedar Major Mall Singh, Subedar Major Sohan Singh, Subedar Major Darbara Singh, Subedar Major Puran Singh
- Order Of British India (2nd Class) - Subedar Mokand Singh
- Mention-in-Despatches - Lieutenant Colonel (Temp) J D Maling DSO, MC, Subedar Labh Singh, Naik Munsha Singh, Lance Naik Kartar Singh, Sepoy Mehar Singh, Sepoy Tehal Singh
- Certificates of Gallantry - 4

(all from 1 Sikh LI)

== Awards and decorations (Post-independence) ==
Battle honours

- Kalidhar (6 Sikh LI)
- OP Hill (NL-1053) (5 Sikh LI)
- Fatehpur (8 Sikh LI)
- Parbat Ali (10 Sikh LI)

Theatre honours

- Jammu and Kashmir 1965 (5 Sikh LI and 6 Sikh LI)
- Punjab 1965 (1 Sikh LI)
- East Pakistan 1971 (2 Sikh LI and 4 Sikh LI)
- Punjab 1971 (8 Sikh LI)
- Sindh 1971 (10 Sikh LI)

Chief of Army Staff Citations

For counter-insurgency operations, unit citations are given instead of battle or theatre honours.

- 1995 - 8 Sikh LI (Kashmir), 2 RR (Kashmir)
- 1996 - 13 Sikh LI (Manipur)
- 1996 - 6 Sikh LI (Mendhar)
- 2001 - 15 Sikh LI (Assam)
- 2002 - 2 RR (Kashmir)
- 2004 - 16 Sikh LI (Assam)
- 2018 - 19 RR
- 2019 - 12 Sikh LI
- 2023 - 8 Sikh LI

Gallantry awards

- Ashoka Chakra - Second Lieutenant Pollur Mutthuswamy Raman†, 3 Sikh LI
- Maha Vir Chakra - Lieutenant Colonel Pagadala Kuppuswamy Nandagopal, 6 Sikh LI, Lieutenant Colonel Sant Singh, 5 Sikh LI, Naik Darshan Singh†, 5 Sikh LI, Lieutenant Colonel Harish Chandra Pathak, 8 Sikh LI, Brigadier Sant Singh MVC, FJ Sector
- Kirti Chakra - Captain Mehta Singh†, 3 Sikh LI, Subedar Nasib Singh, 3 Sikh LI, Sepoy Mohinder Singh, 3 Sikh LI, Sepoy Chuhar Singh, 4 Sikh LI, Second Lieutenant PN Mohapatra, 14 Sikh LI, Sepoy Satnam Singh†, 7 Sikh LI, Major Ashok Kumar Sahrawat†, 19 RR, Lance Havildar Jora Singh†, 1 Sikh LI, Major James Thomas†, 10 Sikh LI, Colonel Manpreet Singh SM†, 19 RR
- Vir Chakra - 23
- Shaurya Chakra - 28
- Sena Medal - 182
- Param Vishisht Seva Medal - 14
- Ati Vishisht Seva Medal - 28
- Yudh Seva Medal - 13
- Vishisht Seva Medal - 17
- Mention-in-Despatches - 109
- COAS's Commendation Cards - 322

† - indicates that the award was given posthumously.

== Notable Officers ==
The Sikh Light Infantry has the unique honour of producing three Army Chiefs and two Army Commanders.

- General Ved Prakash Malik, PVSM, AVSM : 1997-2000
- General Bikram Singh PVSM, UYSM, AVSM, SM, VSM, ADC : 2012-14
- General Manoj Mukund Naravane, PVSM, AVSM, SM, VSM, ADC : 2019-22
- Lieutenant General AK Chatterjee PVSM, VSM - GOC-in-C of Southern Command : 1988-90
- Lieutenant General Devraj Anbu PVSM, UYSM, AVSM, YSM, SM - GOC-in-C of Northern Command : 2016-18 and 39th Vice Chief of Army Staff : 2018-19

== See also ==
- List of regiments of the Indian Army
- Sikh Pioneers & Sikh Light Infantry Association UK
- Bombay Engineer Group
