= Jai Singh Nain =

Former Officer-Commanding-in-Chief of the Indian Army

Lieutenant General Jai Singh Nain PVSM, AVSM, SM
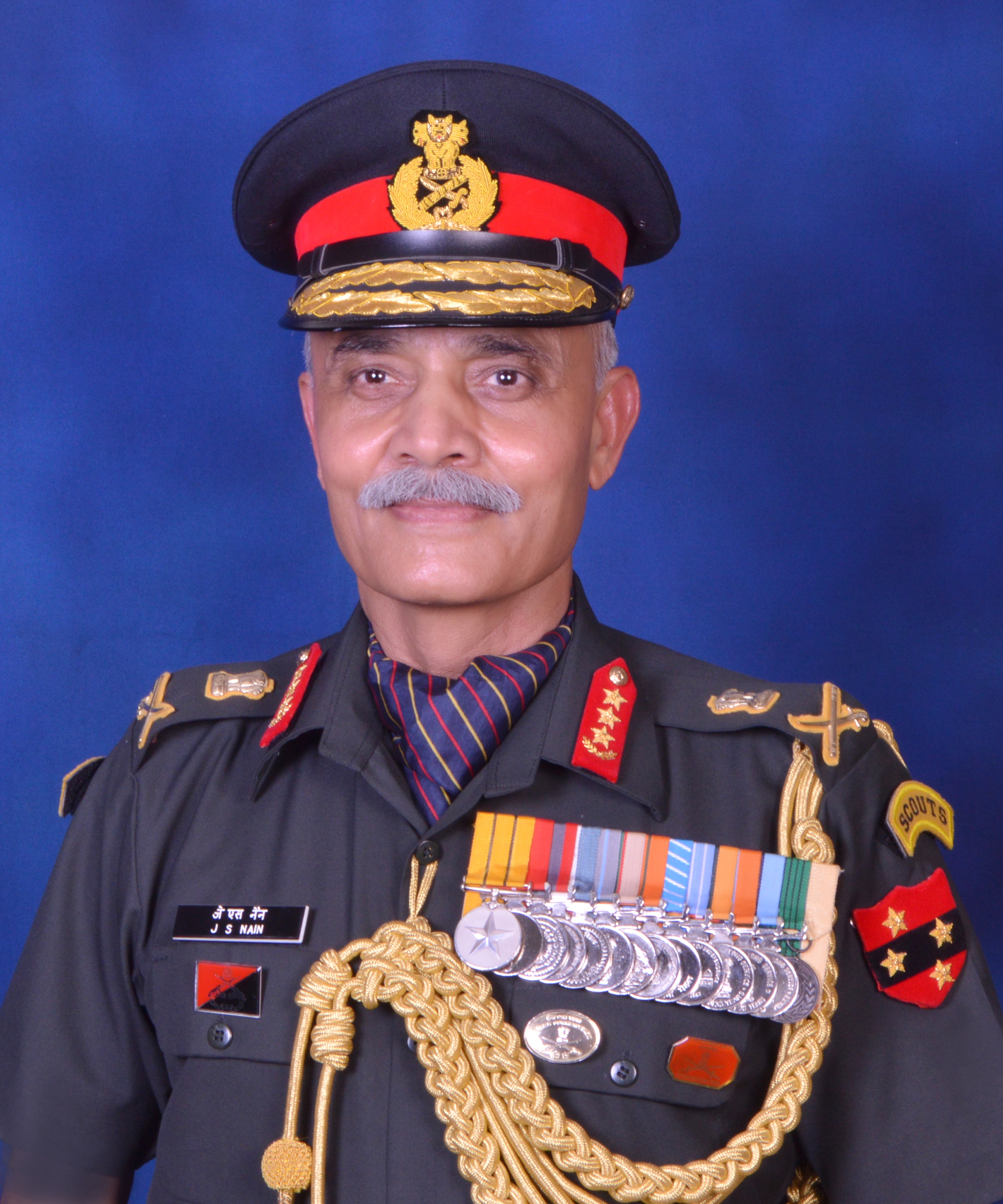
- Military career
- Allegiance: India
- Branch: Indian Army
- Service years: 18 June 1983 – 31 October 2022
- Rank: Lieutenant General
- Service number: IC-41067N
- Commands: Southern Army; 9 Corps
- Awards: Param Vishisht Seva Medal; Ati Vishisht Seva Medal; Sena Medal

Lieutenant General Jai Singh Nain PVSM, AVSM, SM, ADC is a former General Officer-Commanding-in-Chief (GOC-in-C) Southern Command of the Indian Army. He assumed the post from Lieutenant-General Chandi Prasad Mohanty. He had his schooling from the Sainik School, Kunjpura.

== Career ==
Nain was commissioned into the 2nd battalion of the Dogra Regiment in June 1983. He is a graduate of the Defence Services Staff College, Wellington, the College of Defence Management, Secunderabad and the National Defence College (Bangladesh).

Nain has served as a United Nations military observer with the UN mission in Iraq and Kuwait. He is the alumnus of Sainik School Kunjpura, Karnal Haryana. and belongs to 62nd course Hunter Squadron of National Defence Academy Khadakwasla Pune

== Decorations ==

Param Vishisht Seva Medal	Ati Vishisht Seva Medal		Sena Medal
Special Service Medal	Siachen Glacier Medal	Operation Vijay Medal	Operation Parakram Medal
Sainya Seva Medal	High Altitude Service Medal	Videsh Seva Medal	50th Anniversary of Independence Medal
30 Years Long Service Medal	20 Years Long Service Medal	9 Years Long Service Medal	UNIKOM

== Dates of rank ==
Insignia	Rank	Component	Date of rank
	Second Lieutenant	Indian Army	18 June 1983
	Lieutenant	Indian Army	18 June 1985
	Captain	Indian Army	18 June 1988
	Major	Indian Army	18 June 1994
	Lieutenant-Colonel	Indian Army	16 December 2004
	Colonel	Indian Army	15 March 2006
	Brigadier	Indian Army	9 August 2010 (substantive, with seniority from 14 August 2009)
	Major General	Indian Army	18 November 2015 (seniority from 23 August 2014)
	Lieutenant-General	Indian Army	23 February 2018

Military offices
Preceded by Chandi Prasad Mohanty	General Officer-Commanding-in-Chief Southern Command; 1 February 2021 – 1 November 2022	Succeeded by Ajai Kumar Singh
Preceded by Yenduru Venkata Krishna Mohan	General Officer Commanding 9 Corps; 12 January 2019 – 16 February 2020	Succeeded by Upendra Dwivedi
