= 27 AD Missile Regiment (Amritsar Airfield) =

Indian military unit

- Active: 1942 – present
- Country: India
- Allegiance: British India; India
- Branch: British Indian Army; Indian Army
- Type: Corps of Army Air Defence
- Size: Regiment
- Motto: “Sky high excellence”
- Colors: Sky Blue and Red
- Equipment: Akash surface-to-air missiles
- Decorations: Vir Chakra 5 Sena Medal 4 Vishisht Seva Medal 2 Mention in Despatches 5
- Battle honours: ‘Amritsar Airfield’

Commanders
- Notable commanders: Lieutenant General Nav Kumar Khanduri

Insignia
- Abbreviation: 27 AD Regt

27 Air Defence Missile Regiment (Amritsar Airfield) is an Air Defence regiment of the Indian Army.

== Formation ==
27 Air Defence Missile Regiment was raised on 1 February 1942 by Major (later Lt Col) HT Hogan at Malir Cantonment (presently in Pakistan) as the 3 Indian Light Anti-Aircraft Regiment with the troop nucleus being of South Indian classes.

== History ==
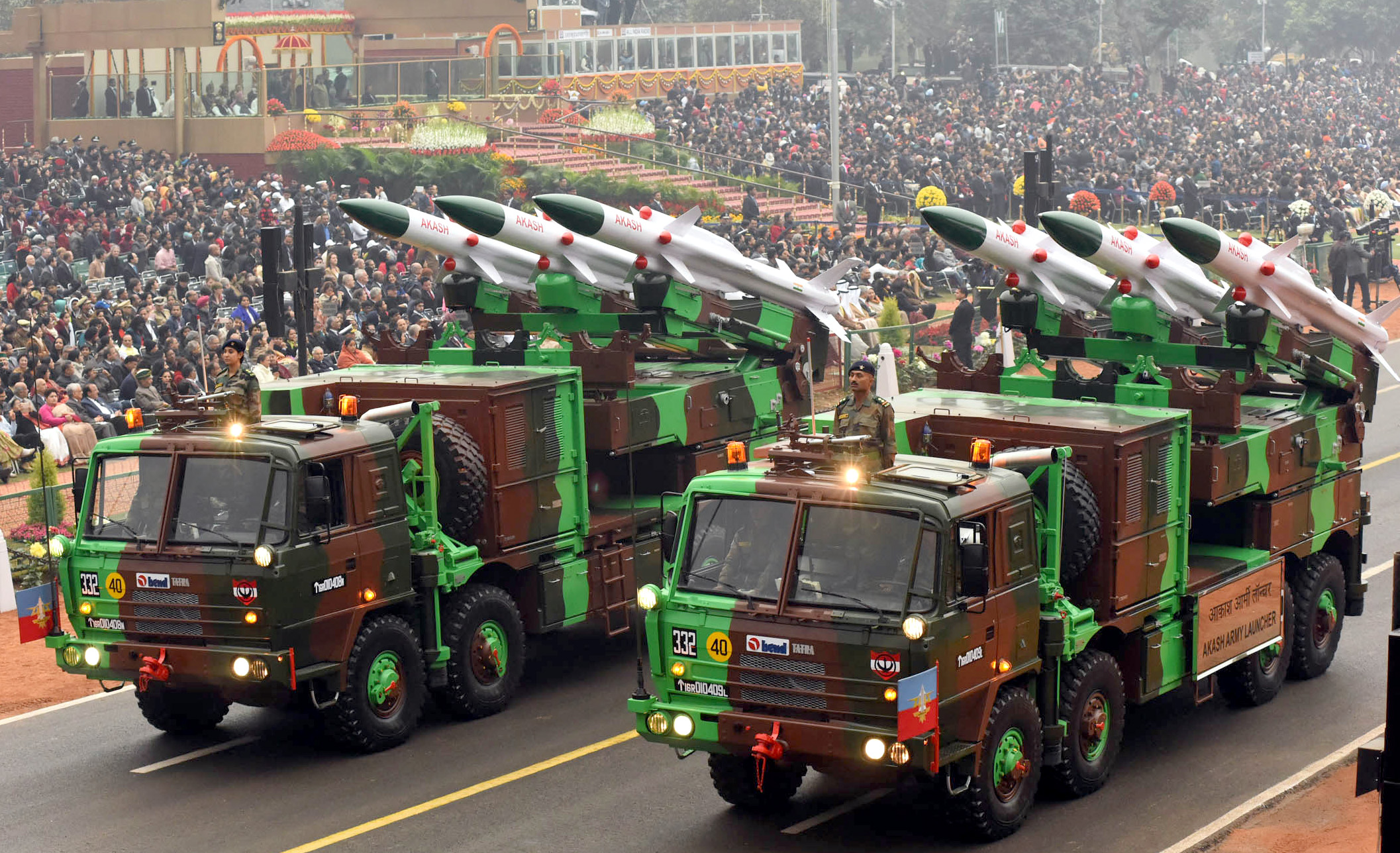
Akash missiles of 27 AD Missile Regt during the 2017 Republic Day parade

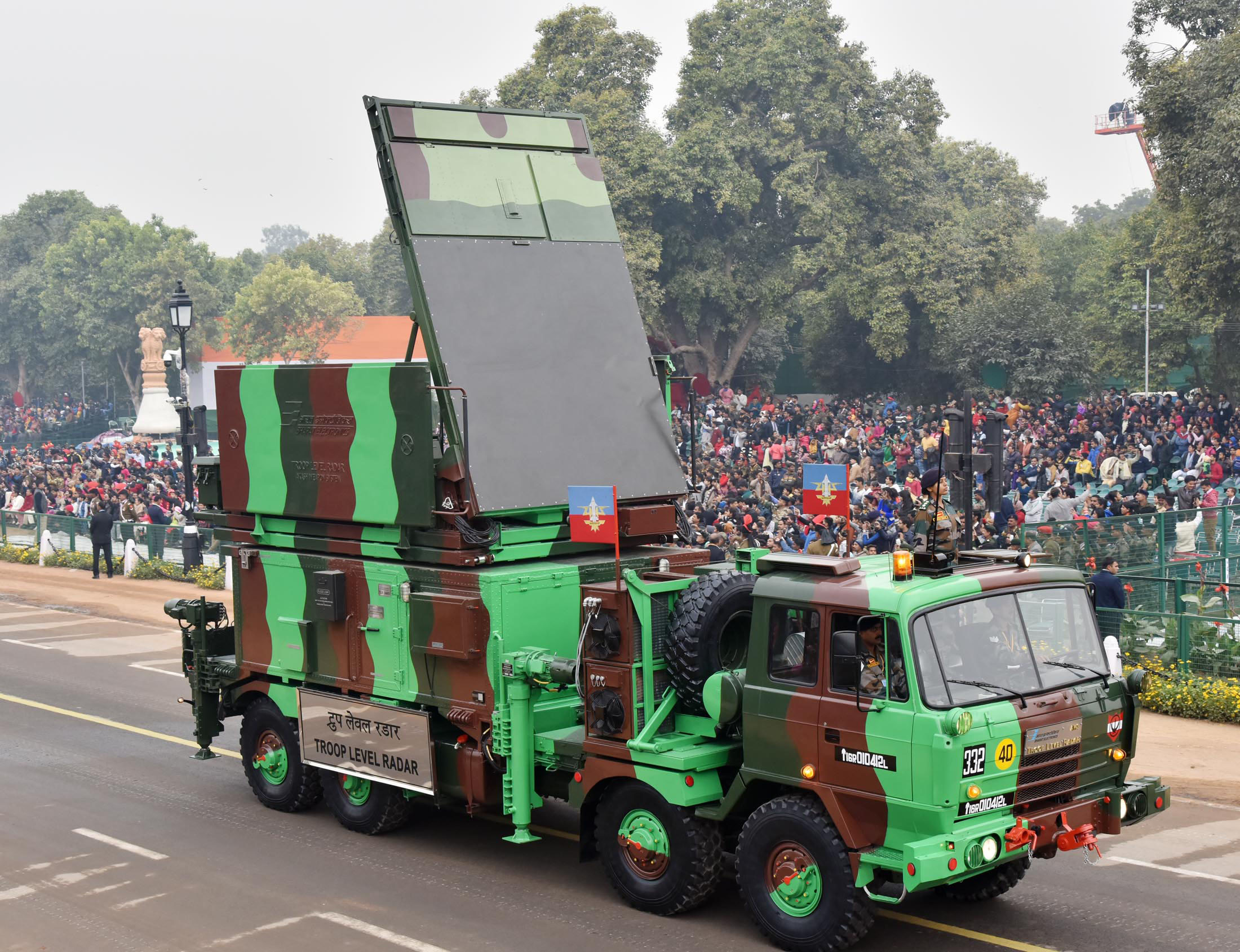
Rajendra Radar of 27 AD Missile Regt during the 2018 Republic Day parade

At the time of its formation, the Regiment was equipped with Bofors 40 mm L-60 and American made anti-aircraft guns.

World War II
Various sub-units of the Regiment were deployed at Chittagong, Ceylon, Bombay and Calcutta. In 1945, the Regiment was moved to Vishakapatnam for training in amphibious assaults and was issued with the new 40 mm self-propelled guns.
Post war
Following the war, the Regiment was moved to Coimbatore. After the partition, the Regiment was transferred to India. It was renamed the 27 Air Defence Regiment in February 1965.

Indo-Pak War (1965)
The Regiment was deployed for various air defence roles in the Western Sector. The gunners of the Regiment were decorated with 2 Vir Chakras, 2 Sena Medals and 5 Mention in Despatches.
Indo-Pakistani War of 1971
The Regiment saw action in the Western Sector with their L-70 guns and was awarded the battle honour title of ‘Amritsar Airfield’ along with 3 Vir Chakras, 1 Sena Medal and 2 Vishisht Seva Medals.
Other Operations

- The Regiment has also participated in Operation Trident, Operation Rakshak I, Operation Rakshak II and Operation Vijay. During its participation in counter-insurgency operations, it was awarded 1 Sena Medal, 1 COAS Commendation Card, 11 GOC-in-C (Northern Command) Commendation Cards and the unit appreciation ‘’Kupwara-Kargil” by the GOC-in-C (Northern Command).
- It took part in the relief and rescue operations in the 2001 Gujarat earthquake, for which the Regiment was awarded 1 COAS Commendation Card and 2 GOC-in-C (Southern Command) Commendation Cards. For its efforts in rescuing riot affected people during the 2002 Gujarat riots, the Regiments received 5 GOC-in-C (Southern Command) Commendation Cards.
- Subedar Dileep S was awarded COAS Commendation Card in August 2025.
- Captain Himanshu Singh Chouhan and Subedar Muninder Singh were conferred with GOC-in-C South Western Command Commendation Cards on Army Day 2026 for their contributions during Operation Sindoor.

== Achievements ==
- The Regiment was awarded the Director General Army Air Defence's (DGAAD) unit appreciation award in 2005 and 2015.
- The Regiment participated with its Akash surface-to-air missiles in the Republic Day parades of 2016, 2017, 2018, 2023 and 2026.
