= Ajai Kumar Singh =

Indian Army general

Lieutenant General Ajai Kumar Singh PVSM AVSM YSM SM VSM
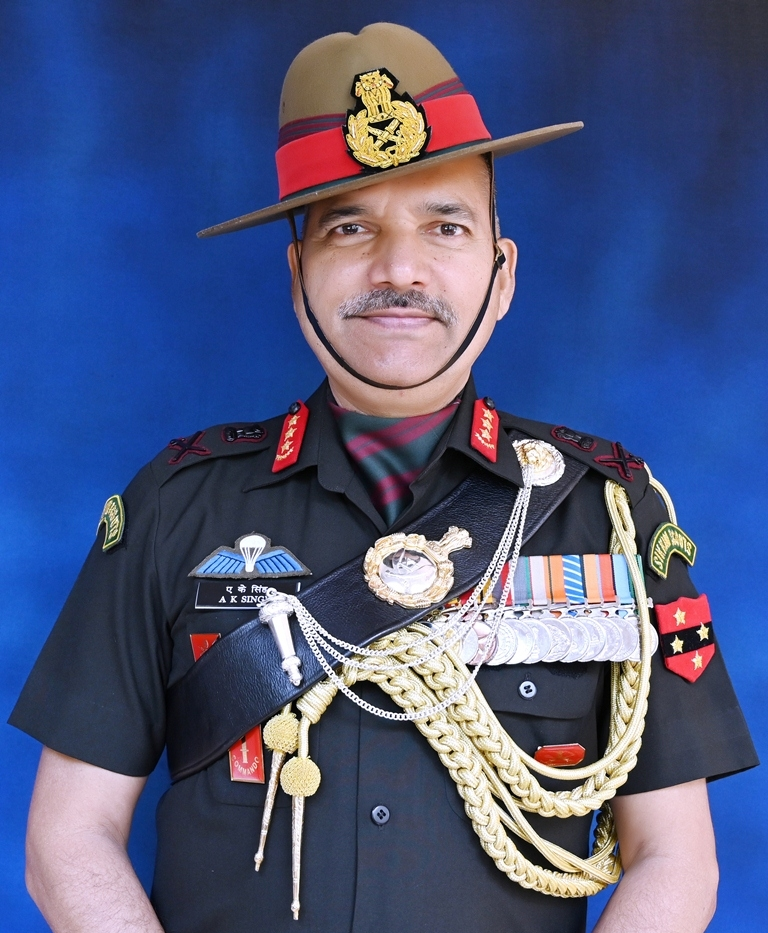

General Officer Commanding-in-Chief Southern Command
- In office 1 November 2022 – 30 June 2024
- Chief of Army Staff: Manoj Pande
- Preceded by: Jai Singh Nain
- Succeeded by: Dhiraj Seth

Military service
- Allegiance: India
- Branch/service: Indian Army
- Years of service: 15 December 1984 – 30 June 2024
- Rank: Lieutenant General
- Unit: 7/11 Gorkha Rifles
- Commands: Southern Army; XXXIII Corps; 1/11 Gorkha Rifles
- Service number: IC-42336F
- Awards: Param Vishisht Seva Medal; Ati Vishisht Seva Medal; Yudh Seva Medal; Sena Medal; Vishisht Seva Medal

Lieutenant General Ajai Kumar Singh PVSM, AVSM, YSM, SM, VSM is a retired general officer of the Indian Army. He was the General Officer Commanding-in-Chief Southern Command of the Indian Army, he assumed the post upon superannuation of Lieutenant General Jai Singh Nain. He previously served as General Officer Commanding XXXIII Corps.

== Early life and education ==
The general officer is an alumnus of St Gabriel's Academy, Roorkee. He then attended the National Defence Academy and the Indian Military Academy. He is also a graduate of the Defence Services Staff College, Wellington and the National Defence College.

== Military career ==
The general officer was commissioned into the 7th battalion of the 11th Gorkha Rifles on 15 December 1984 from the Indian Military Academy. He has commanded 1/11 Gorkha Rifles as part of a Strike Corps, and subsequently on the Line of Control. He later commanded a brigade in Rann Sector, a Counter Insurgency Force in J&K and XXXIII Corps in the Eastern Sector.

== Awards and decorations ==
The general officer is a recipient of Param Vishist Seva Medal, Ati Vishisht Seva Medal, Yudh Seva Medal, Sena Medal and Vishisht Seva Medal.

Param Vishisht Seva Medal	Ati Vishisht Seva Medal		Yudh Seva Medal
Sena Medal	Vishisht Seva Medal	Special Service Medal	Siachen Glacier Medal
Operation Parakram Medal	Sainya Seva Medal	High Altitude Medal	75th Independence Anniversary Medal
50th Independence Anniversary Medal	30 Years Long Service Medal	20 Years Long Service Medal	9 Years Long Service Medal

== Dates of rank ==
Insignia	Rank	Component	Date of rank
	Second Lieutenant	Indian Army	15 December 1984
	Lieutenant	Indian Army	15 December 1986
	Captain	Indian Army	15 December 1989
	Major	Indian Army	15 December 1995
	Lieutenant-Colonel	Indian Army	16 December 2004
	Colonel	Indian Army	1 April 2006
	Brigadier	Indian Army	13 June 2011 (acting); 14 November 2011 (substantive, with seniority from 3 April 2010)
	Major General	Indian Army	17 March 2017 (seniority from 1 February 2015)
	Lieutenant-General	Indian Army	28 January 2020

Military offices
Preceded by Nav Kumar Khanduri	General Officer Commanding XXXIII Corps; 14 September 2020 – 21 October 2021	Succeeded by Tarun Kumar Aich
Preceded by Jai Singh Nain	General Officer Commanding-in-Chief Southern Command; 1 November 2022 - 30 June 2024	Succeeded by Dhiraj Seth
