= 1st Regiment of Horse =

1st Regiment of Horse or 1st Horse may refer to:

- Royal Horse Guards, ranked as 1st Horse from 1661 to 1746
- 4th Royal Irish Dragoon Guards, ranked as 1st (Irish) Horse from 1746 to 1788
- 1st Horse (Skinner's Horse)
