= IX Corps (India) =

Military field formation of the Indian Army

- Indian Army IX Corps Formation Sign
- Active: 2005–present
- Country: India
- Branch: Indian Army
- Role: Holding Corps
- Size: Corps
- Part of: Western Command
- Garrison/HQ: Yol Military Station
- Nickname: Rising Star Corps
- Anniversaries: September 1
- Engagements: Sino-Indian border dispute: 2020–2021 China–India skirmishes

Commanders
- Current commander: Lt Gen Akaash Johar, AVSM
- Notable commanders: General Upendra Dwivedi; Lt Gen Praveen Bakshi; Lt Gen Satinder Kumar Saini; Lt Gen Jai Singh Nain; Lt Gen Pushpendra Pal Singh; Lt Gen Shrinjay Pratap Singh

The IX Corps, or the Rising Star Corps, was raised in 2005 as a Holding Corps at the Yol Military Station of the Indian Army.

== History ==
It was raised on September 1, 2005, by splitting the southern formations of Nagrota-based XVI ‘White Knight’ Corps, which forms part of the Udhampur-based Northern Command. It is based at Yol military station, 10 kilometres (6 mi) southeast of Dharamsala in Himachal Pradesh. It is presently part of Army's Chandimandir based Western Command and encompasses parts of Punjab, Jammu and Kashmir and Himachal Pradesh.

The first General Officer Commanding was Lieutenant General Anup Singh Jamwal, who had successfully commanded 4 Corps in the North East.

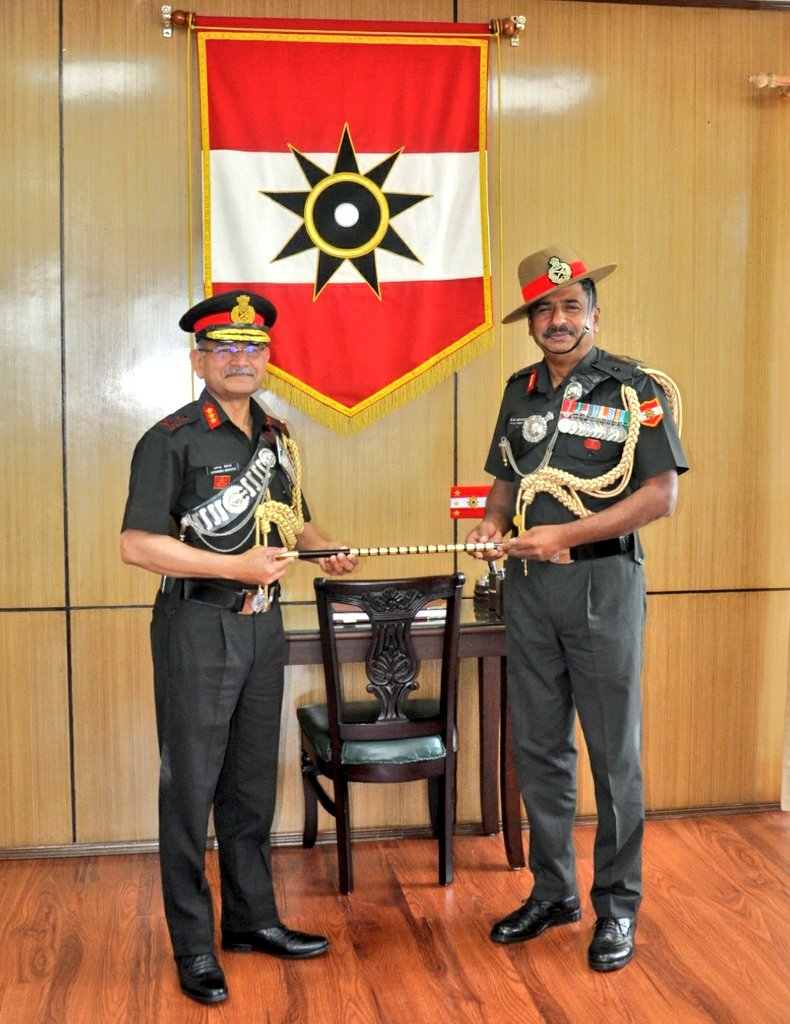
Lt Gen PN Ananthanarayanan, SM takes over command of 9 Corps on 26 March 2021.

== Order of Battle ==
The 9 Corps consists of the following-

- 26 Infantry Division (Tiger Division) headquartered at Jammu
- 29 Infantry Division (Gurj Division) headquartered at Pathankot
- 2 (Independent) Armoured Brigade (Fleur-de-lis Brigade) (former 252nd Indian Armoured Brigade)
- 3 (Independent) Armoured Brigade (Sabre Brigade)
- 16 (Independent) Armoured Brigade (Block Arrow Brigade)(Dec 1971 placed under 54 Infantry Division[9]
- 84 Infantry Brigade
- 401 (Independent) Artillery Brigade (Arsenals Brigade)
- Rising Star Air TDefence Brigade
- One Rudra all-arms brigades

== Testbed for Integrated Battle Groups ==
The XVII Corps was one of the Corps, along with IX Corps, were used as the testbeds to explore the concept of Integrated Battle Group (IBG) combined arms formations. The concept was initially conceived in 2013 during a field exercise in Punjab and was later revived in 2018 by the then Chief of the Army Staff (CoAS) General Bipin Rawat.

The Integrated Battle Groups were Brigade-sized, self-sufficient combined arms units commanded by an officer of the rank Major General. They were meant to transform the overall field formation of the Indian Army. The concept was tested with the IX Corps by July 2019 and were undergoing certain reorganisation based on few feedbacks. The new restructuring will further reduce the 72-hours response time determined in the Cold Start Doctrine to under 24 hours. Their resources and structure would be decided based on the threat and terrain at the deployment location. An IBG would include 5,000 troops and sub units from multiple arms like infantry, armoured, artillery and air defence. In October 2019, the XVII Corps conducted Exercise Him Vijay, the first field implementation of such a formation, which included three IBGs from the 59 Infantry Division.

By May 2022, the IBGs were test-bedded by IX Corps and further validated by the XVII Corps. The Army identified these Corps for total 'IBG-isation', which would be done parallel to the formation of Integrated Theatre Commands to integrate the Armed Forces into larger theatres. The IBGs will replace the traditional Brigades (3,000-3,500 troops) and Divisions (10,000-12,000 troops) existing in the Army.

As of June 2024, 2 IBGs under 9 Corps and 5 IBGs under 17 Corps had been raised two phases, respectively. These formations were war-gamed and validated in multiple exercises. The Army HQ had earlier submitted the report on Phase-1 of 'IBG-isation' to the Defence Ministry while the same for Phase 2 was to be submitted before issuing the official Government Sanction Letter (GSL). The original plan was to first carve out 8-10 IBGs (5,000 to 6,000 troops each) initially and then create more over the years. As of now, the Army has 14 Corps (40,000 to 70,000 troops each), with four of them being strike formations. By November 2024, the Army submitted a draft Government Sanction Letter seeking official approval for the establishment of these IBGs. The issuing of the GSL will imply the approval for the implementation of IBGs. Post approval, the Army aims to have the IBGs operational by 2025.

On 26 July 2025, on the occasion of 26th Kargil Vijay Diwas, the CoAS General Upendra Dwivedi introduced the Rudra all-arms brigades in Drass War Memorial. The plan includes conversion of 250 single-arm brigades to all-arms ones with integration of fighting elements like infantry, mechanised infantry, armoured (tanks), Special Forces as well as support elements like artillery, engineers, air defence, electronic warfare and UAVs (unmanned aerial vehicles). The formations will receive specially prepared logistics for support and combat support. The design of the all-arms brigade itself evolved from the IBG concept with few but major modifications including these brigades being slightly larger than standard brigades against the IBG which were scaled-down Divisions. Also, the Rudra units will be commanded by a Brigadier-ranked officer, unlike a Major General-commanded IBG formation. While one brigade each, under the IX and XVII Corps, have already been converted to Rudra brigade, they are likely to be operationalised with few months.

== List of Commanders ==
General Officer Commanding IX Corps
| Rank | Name | Appointment Date | Left office | Unit of Commission | References |
|---|---|---|---|---|---|
| Lieutenant General | Anup Singh Jamwal | 1 September 2005 | 9 October 2005 | Regiment of Artillery | |
| Lieutenant General | P K Rampal | 10 October 2005 | 2006 | 11th Gorkha Rifles | |
| Lieutenant General | Balraj Singh Nagal | 2006 | February 2008 | Jat Regiment | |
| Lieutenant General | Vinay Sharma | February 2008 | February 2009 | Dogra Regiment | |
| Lieutenant General | G M Nair | March 2009 | January 2010 | 11th Gorkha Rifles | |
| Lieutenant General | AK Choudhary | January 2010 | June 2012 | Mahar Regiment | |
| Lieutenant General | Anil Kumar Bhalla | 5 June 2012 | 25 June 2013 | Armoured Corps | |
| Lieutenant General | Praveen Bakshi | 26 June 2013 | 2014 | 1st Horse (Skinner's Horse) | |
| Lieutenant General | Rajeev Tewari | 2014 | 28 November 2015 | Armoured Corps | |
| Lieutenant General | Ashok Ambre | 29 November 2015 | 3 January 2017 | Maratha Light Infantry | |
| Lieutenant General | Satinder Kumar Saini | 4 January 2017 | 9 January 2018 | Jat Regiment | |
| Lieutenant General | YVK Mohan | 10 January 2018 | 11 January 2019 | 11th Gorkha Rifles | |
| Lieutenant General | Jai Singh Nain | 12 January 2019 | 16 Feb 2020 | Dogra Regiment | |
| Lieutenant General | Upendra Dwivedi | 16 February 2020 | 26 March 2021 | Jammu and Kashmir Rifles | |
| Lieutenant General | PN Ananthanarayanan | 26 March 2021 | 14 April 2022 | 8th Gorkha Rifles | |
| Lieutenant General | Pushpendra Pal Singh | 15 April 2022 | 8 June 2023 | Parachute Regiment | |
| Lieutenant General | Shrinjay Pratap Singh | 9 June 2023 | 9 August 2024 | Kumaon Regiment | |
| Lieutenant General | Rajan Sharawat | 10 August 2024 | 30 June 2026 | Garhwal Rifles | |
| Lieutenant General | Akaash Johar | 1 July 2026 | Incumbent | Bihar Regiment | |
