= Sartaj Singh (general) =

Indian army general

Lieutenant General Sartaj Singh GM
- Died: 23 April 1998
- Military career
- Allegiance: India
- Branch: Indian Army
- Service years: 1940–1974
- Rank: Lieutenant General
- Unit: Regiment of Artillery
- Commands: Southern Command
- Conflicts: World War II; Indo-Pakistani War of 1965; Indo-Pakistani War of 1971
- Awards: George Medal; Padma Bhushan

Lieutenant General Sartaj Singh GM (died 23 April 1998) was a senior officer in the Indian Army. He was commissioned into the Regiment of Artillery of the British Indian Army in 1940, and served as an anti-tank gunner in Ceylon. After completing training to serve as a gunnery staff instructor in the UK in 1947, he served as the first Indian instructor at the School of Artillery in Deolali. He served on a United Nations peacekeeping mission in the Congo, and commanded a division in the Indo-Pakistani War of 1965. He served as the GOC, XV Corps on the western front during the Indo Pakistan War of 1971. He was then awarded the Padma Bhushan in 1972 for his outstanding services to the nation. At the time of his retirement in 1974 he was General Officer Commanding-in-Chief of the Southern Command, with the rank of lieutenant general.
