= XXXIII Corps (India) =

Military field formation of the Indian Army

- Formation Sign of XXXIII Corps
- Active: 1942-1945; 1960 – present
- Country: India
- Branch: Indian Army
- Role: Mountain (Holding) Corps
- Size: Corps
- Part of: Eastern Command
- Garrison/HQ: Siliguri
- Nickname: Trishakti Corps

Commanders
- Current commander: Lt Gen Manraj Singh Mann; SM**
- Notable commanders: General Deepak Kapoor; General Krishnaswamy Sundarji; General Jagjit Singh Aurora; General Gopal Gurunath Bewoor; Lt Gen Harbaksh Singh

The XXXIII Corps, or the Trishakti Corps, is a corps of the Indian Army. It draws some of its heritage from the British Indian XXXIII Corps, which was formed in 1942 but disbanded in 1945. It was re-raised in 1960 at Shillong.

The corps is headquartered in Sukna in Siliguri, North Bengal and is commanded by a Three Star officer of the rank of lieutenant general titled general officer commanding (GOC). His chief of staff is a two-star officer of the rank of major general. The total troop strength of the XXXIII corps is estimated to be between 45,000 and 60,000 soldiers.

== History ==
The XXXIII Corps Operating Signal Regiment was a part of XIV Army during World War II. The regiment moved to its present location along with the Corps HQ in 1962. It participated in the Indo-China war of 1962 and captured some Chinese communication equipment. This equipment is kept in the Corps of Signals Museum at Jabalpur to enable future generations of soldiers to know about the bravery and dedication shown by their predecessors.

== Re-raising ==
The corps was re-raised by Lieutenant General Umrao Singh on 1 November 1960, to reduce IV Corps' area of responsibility. The corps is headquartered in Sukna in North Bengal, near the city of Siliguri. Its area of responsibility includes North Bengal, Sikkim, and if needed, Bhutan. It comprises three mountain divisions, 17th (Gangtok), 20th (Binnaguri), and 27th (Kalimpong).

The coat of arms consists of a white horizontal band between two red bands (the standard formation sign background for corps in the Indian Army) with a black trident and a black spear with black wings in the foreground. The Corps HQ has an Indian Air Force air control unit attached to it, 3 TAC, commanded by a group captain. The corps also has an organic Army Aviation Helicopter Squadron based at Sevoke flying the HAL Chetak. It is commanded by a colonel. The Indian Air Force bases at Bagdogra (Siliguri) and Hashimara are the air units co-tasked to the XXXIII Corps Area of Responsibility.

== ORBAT ==
It currently consists of:

- 17th Mountain Division (Blackcat Division) headquartered at Gangtok.
  - It was raised in 1959 and converted to a mountain division in 1963.
  - It is assigned to the Sikkim sector.
- 20th Mountain Division (Kirpan Division) headquartered at Binnaguri.
  - It was raised in 1963 and assigned to the Sikkim sector.
  - Composed of the 66th, 165th, and 202nd Mountain Brigades in 1971.
- 27th Mountain Division (Striking Lion Division) headquartered at Kalimpong.
  - It was converted to a mountain division in 1963.
- Division Artillery Brigade
- MR-SAM (Abhra) Regiment (raised in February 2023)

== Indo-Pakistani War of 1971 ==
The corps handled the sensitive Indo-Tibetan border and was responsible for the defence of the McMahon Line. The corps under Lieutenant General Mohan L. Thapan controlled the 6th and 20th Mountain Divisions and the 71st Mountain Brigade. While fighting the war in the south, however, the corps also had to look north and retained command of the 17th and 27th Mountain Divisions on the Tibetan frontier. Furthermore, Thapan could not commit the 6th Mountain Division without permission from New Delhi, as it was to be held ready to move to the Bhutanese border in case China intervened in the war.

As elsewhere along the border, Indian forces in support of the Mukti Bahini made significant inroads into East Pakistan before 3 December. Most notable was Brigadier Pran Nath Kathpalia's 71st Mountain Brigade, which had pushed to the outskirts of Thakurgaon by the eve of war. Efforts to capture the heavily fortified border village of Hilli, however, failed repeatedly in a struggle that raged off and on from 24 November to 11 December. Resolutely defended by Pakistani 4 Frontier Force, Hilli blocked the proposed advance of the 20th Division across the narrow "waist" of this sector.

After heavy losses in front of Hilli, the 20th Division solved this problem by swinging around to the north and unleashing the 340th Brigade under Brigadier Joginder Singh Bakshi. Bakshi moved swiftly to control the main north-south road, unhinging the defence of Hilli, splitting the Pakistani 16th Division, and opening the way to Bogra, which town he effectively controlled by war's end. The Pakistani division, despite continued resistance by isolated units, had ceased to exist as a coherent combat formation. Indicative of the chaotic situation, General Shah and the commander of the 205th Brigade, Brigadier Tajammul Hussain Malik, were almost captured when Indian forces ambushed their convoy on 7 December. On the other hand, a last-minute Indian move north by the 66th and 202nd Brigades to capture Rangpur proved unsuccessful.

In secondary actions, the 9th Mountain Brigade secured most of the area north of the Tista River and an ad hoc command of Indian BSF and Mukti Bahini under Brigadier Prem Singh pushed out of Malda to capture Nawabganj in the extreme southeastern corner of the sector. Despite Bakshi's performance and the generally successful advance of 71st Brigade, much of XXXIII Corps' offensive power was allowed to lie idle far too long and Pakistani troops still held the major towns of the sector (Rangpur, Saidpur, Dinajpur, Nator, Rajshahi) when the cease-fire was announced. Likewise, the cease-fire intervened before the Indians could implement a hastily conceived plan to transfer the 340th Brigade, a tank squadron, and an artillery battery across the Jamuna via the Phulchari ferry to take part in the advance on Dacca. Except for this squadron, all the armour was preparing to transfer to the west by the end of the war.

== General Officers Commanding ==
Rank	Name	Appointment Date	Left office	Unit of Commission	References
Lieutenant General	Umrao Singh	1 November 1960	28 October 1962	Rajputana Rifles	
Lieutenant General	Harbaksh Singh	29 October 1962	29 October 1964	Sikh Regiment	
Lieutenant General	Gopal Gurunath Bewoor	30 October 1964	26 April 1967	10th Baluch Regiment	
Lieutenant General	Jagjit Singh Aurora	27 April 1967	March 1969	Punjab Regiment	
Lieutenant General	Mohan L Thapan	1969	May 1972	Jat Regiment	
Lieutenant General	H C Rai	June 1972	July 1974	Rajputana Rifles	
Lieutenant General	WAG Pinto	1976	1978	13th Frontier Force Rifles	
Lieutenant General	Krishnaswamy Sundarji	February 1979	January 1980	Mahar Regiment	
Lieutenant General	Krishnaswami Balaram	January 1980	26 December 1981	Corps of Signals	
Lieutenant General	S S Brar	27 December 1981	11 December 1983	Armoured Corps	
Lieutenant General	J K Puri	12 December 1983		Regiment of Artillery	
Lieutenant General	M R Sharma			Dogra Regiment	
Lieutenant General	Arun Kumar Gautama	July 1993	April 1994	16th Light Cavalry	
Lieutenant General	A B Masih			Kumaon Regiment	
Lieutenant General	H R S Mann	4 October 1999	19 November 2000	Brigade of the Guards	
Lieutenant General	Ashok Chaki	20 November 2000	19 August 2002	4th Gorkha Rifles	
Lieutenant General	Avtar Singh	20 August 2002	20 February 2004	Jat Regiment	
Lieutenant General	Deepak Kapoor	21 February 2004	14 April 2005	Regiment of Artillery	
Lieutenant General	Thomas Mathew	15 April 2005	25 August 2006	Rajput Regiment	
Lieutenant General	CKS Sabu	26 August 2006	25 September 2007	Regiment of Artillery	
Lieutenant General	Deepak Raj	26 September 2007	31 August 2008	Mechanised Infantry Regiment	
Lieutenant General	Prashant Kumar Rath	1 September 2008	25 November 2009	Regiment of Artillery	
Lieutenant General	D S Sidhu	26 November 2009	2 November 2010	17th Horse (Poona Horse)	
Lieutenant General	Vinod Bhatia	3 November 2010	24 November 2011	Parachute Regiment	
Lieutenant General	Kotheneth Surendranath	25 November 2011	31 January 2013	71 Armoured Regiment	
Lieutenant General	Kamal Jit Singh	1 February 2013	11 May 2014	63rd Cavalry	
Lieutenant General	G S Chandel	12 May 2014	25 July 2015	Bihar Regiment	
Lieutenant General	Surinder Singh	26 July 2015	26 August 2016	Brigade of the Guards	
Lieutenant General	Sanjay Kumar Jha	27 August 2016	27 August 2017	The Sikh Regiment	
Lieutenant General	Pradeep M Bali	28 August 2017	29 August 2018	Punjab Regiment	
Lieutenant General	Chandi Prasad Mohanty	30 August 2018	13 September 2019	Rajput Regiment	
Lieutenant General	Nav Kumar Khanduri	13 September 2019	13 September 2020	Corps of Army Air Defence	
Lieutenant General	Ajai Kumar Singh	14 September 2020	21 October 2021	11th Gorkha Rifles	
Lieutenant General	Tarun Kumar Aich	22 October 2021	31 October 2022	Madras Regiment	
Lieutenant General	VPS Kaushik	1 November 2022	9 June 2024	Kumaon Regiment	
Lieutenant General	Zubin A. Minwalla	10 June 2024	30 September 2025	9th Gorkha Rifles	
Lieutenant General	Man Raj Singh Mann	1 October 2025	Incumbent	1 Gorkha Rifles	

== Sources ==
- Jane's World Armies, Issue 19, 2006
- Globalsecurity.org
