= Chandi Prasad Mohanty =

Indian Army general

Lieutenant General C P Mohanty PVSM AVSM SM VSM
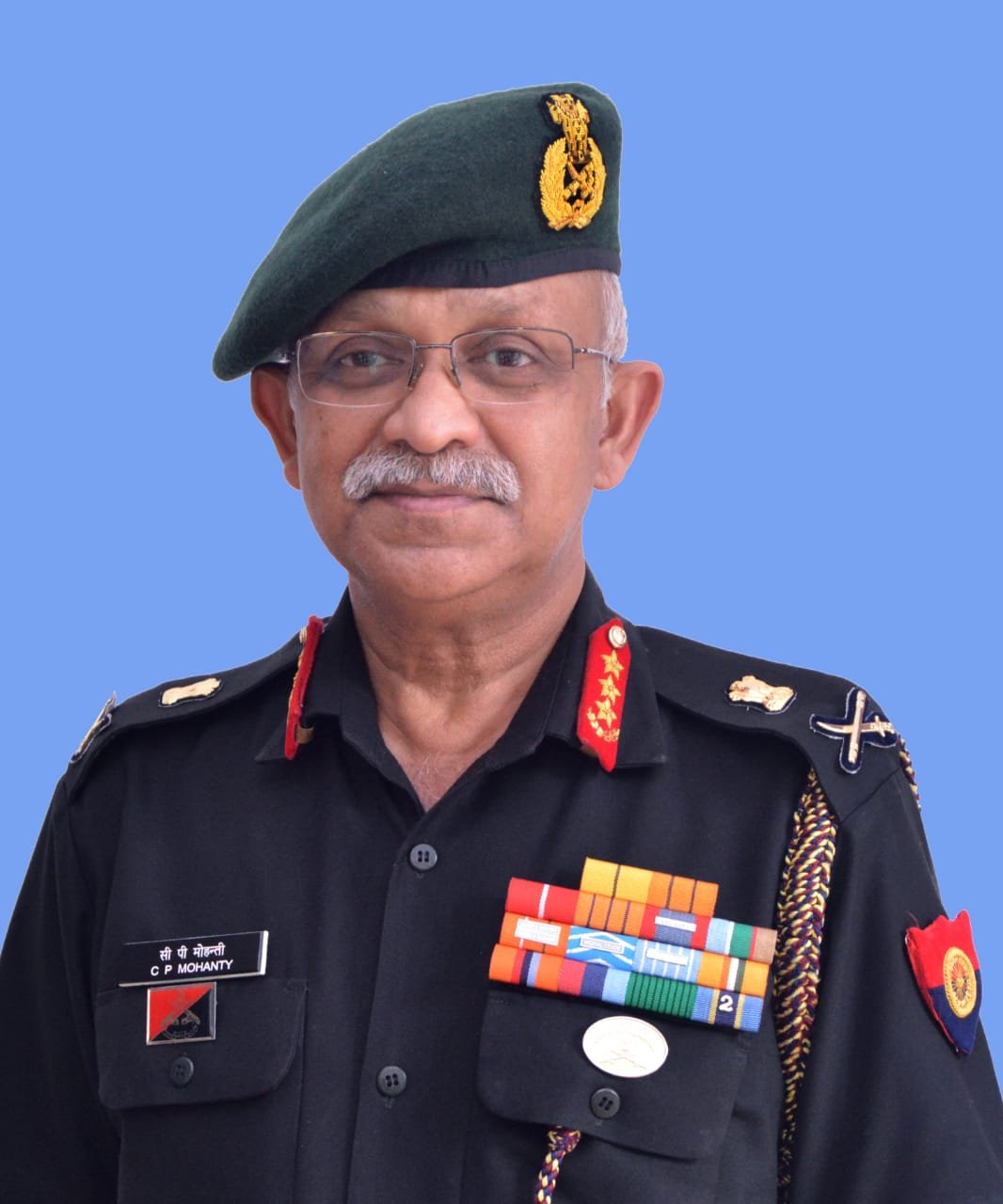

42nd Vice Chief of the Army Staff
- In office 1 February 2021 – 31 January 2022
- Chief of Army Staff: Manoj Mukund Naravane
- Preceded by: Satinder Kumar Saini
- Succeeded by: Manoj Pande

General Officer Commanding-in-Chief Southern Command
- In office 30 January 2020 – 31 January 2021
- Preceded by: Satinder Kumar Saini
- Succeeded by: Jai Singh Nain

Personal details
- Born: Jayabada, Jagatsinghpur Sub-Division, Cuttack district (now Jagatsinghpur district), Odisha

Military service
- Allegiance: India
- Branch/service: Indian Army
- Years of service: June 1982 – 31 January 2022
- Rank: Lieutenant General
- Unit: 6 Rajput Regiment
- Commands: Southern Command; Uttar Bharat Area; XXXIII Corps
- Battles/wars: Insurgency in Northeast India
- Service number: IC-40314K
- Awards: Param Vishisht Seva Medal; Ati Vishisht Seva Medal; Sena Medal; Vishisht Seva Medal

Lieutenant General Chandi Prasad Mohanty PVSM AVSM SM VSM is a retired General Officer in the Indian Army. He was the 42nd Vice Chief of the Army Staff and assumed office on 1 February 2021, following the retirement of Satinder Kumar Saini. He was previously the General Officer Commanding-in-Chief (GOC-in-C) of the Southern Command, assuming command on 30 January 2020. He was trained at RIMC Dehradun.

== Early life and education ==
Mohanty was born in Jagatsinghpur, Odisha to Jitendra K. Mohanty, a civil servant, and Sarada Mohanty, a professor of Odia at S.V.M. College. Following his education at Bagashai U. P. School, he joined the Rashtriya Indian Military College, Dehradun. He subsequently entered the National Defence Academy (NDA). He holds an M. Phil and a Master's in Management and has conducted extensive studies of China, South Asia, and northeastern India. He is a graduate of the Defence Services Staff College, Wellington.

== Career ==
Mohanty was commissioned a second lieutenant in the Rajput Regiment in June 1982. He has commanded battalions in both Jammu and Kashmir and in Northeast India, and has held staff appointments in an armoured brigade and in the military secretariat. He commanded a UN multi-national brigade in the Democratic Republic of the Congo and has served as a military advisor to the Seychelles government. He has also commanded a mountain brigade along the India-China border and a mountain division in Assam in 2014. He also served as Director General of operational logistics and strategic movement at the Integrated Headquarters of the Ministry of Defence (Army) at New Delhi. After the Doklam standoff, he commanded the XXXIII Corps in the Eastern Command and was then appointed GOC Uttar Bharat Area at Bareilly.

== Decorations ==

Param Vishisht Seva Medal		Ati Vishisht Seva Medal	
Sena Medal	Vishisht Seva Medal	Special Service Medal	Operation Parakram Medal
Sainya Seva Medal	High Altitude Service Medal	Videsh Seva Medal	50th Anniversary of Independence Medal
30 Years Long Service Medal	20 Years Long Service Medal	9 Years Long Service Medal	MONUSCO

== Dates of rank ==
Insignia	Rank	Component	Date of rank
	Second Lieutenant	Indian Army	12 June 1982
	Lieutenant	Indian Army	12 June 1984
	Captain	Indian Army	12 June 1987
	Major	Indian Army	12 June 1993
	Lieutenant-Colonel	Indian Army	16 December 2004
	Colonel	Indian Army	1 March 2006
	Brigadier	Indian Army	5 December 2009 (substantive, with seniority from 8 January 2009)
	Major General	Indian Army	10 January 2015 (substantive, with seniority from 4 June 2012)
	Lieutenant-General	Indian Army	20 May 2017 (seniority from 1 May)

Military offices
Preceded by Pradeep M. Bali	General Officer Commanding XXXIII Corps; 30 August 2018 – 13 September 2019	Succeeded by Nav Kumar Khanduri
Preceded by Satinder Kumar Saini	General Officer Commanding-in-Chief Southern Command; 30 January 2020 – 31 January 2021	Succeeded by Jai Singh Nain
Preceded by Satinder Kumar Saini	Vice Chief of the Army Staff; 1 February 2021 – 31 January 2022	Succeeded by Manoj Pande
