= Yol, Himachal Pradesh =

Yol
- Neighborhood
- Location in Himachal Pradesh, India Yol (India)
- Coordinates: 32.17°N 76.2°E
- Country: India
- State: Himachal Pradesh
- District: Kangra
- Elevation: 1,065 m (3,494 ft)

Population (2011)
  - Total: 12,028
  - Rank: 14 in HP

Languages
  - Official: Hindi
  - Regional: Pahari
- Time zone: UTC+5:30 (IST)

Yol is a neighbourhood of Dharmshala city in the Indian state of Himachal Pradesh. It is famous for its military history.

== History ==
The town gets its name from YOL (Young Officers Living), a small town established by British Indian Army around 1849. The Yol Cantt. (cantonment) was built in 1942. Formerly it was known as "majhaitha" village. Yol is the headquarters of the 9 Corps of Indian Army.

Yol was the location of a Prisoner-of-war camp which hosted German soldiers in the First World War and Italian soldiers in the Second World War. Frogman Elios Toschi, a member of the pre-Armistice Decima Flottiglia MAS and inventor of the "maiale", was one of the very few to escape from the camp. After the war, the former POW facility hosted ethnic Tibetan refugees from China.

== Geography ==
Yol is located at 32.17°N 76.2°E in Kangra district. It has an average elevation of 1,221 m (4,006 ft).

Yol is situated 10 km southwest of Dharamsala on the Dharamshala-Chamunda Devi-Palampur road and about 15 km northeast of Kangra town. The nearest railway station is Nagrota Bagwan about 12 km away in south on 762 mm (2 ft 6 in) narrow gauge railway line originating at Pathankot. The nearest broad gauge railhead is Pathankot. The nearest airport is Gaggal airport (IATA airport code DHM), also known as Kangra airport, about 15 km to the west through Dharamshala

== Demographics ==
As of 2001 India census, Yol had a population of 10,772. Males constitute 52% of the population and females 48%. Yol has an average literacy rate of 77%, higher than the national average of 59.5%: male literacy is 80%, and female literacy is 74%. In Yol, 12% of the population is under 6 years of age.
