= Yenduru Venkata Krishna Mohan =

Retired Indian Army general

Lieutenant General Y V K Mohan PVSM, AVSM, SM, VSM
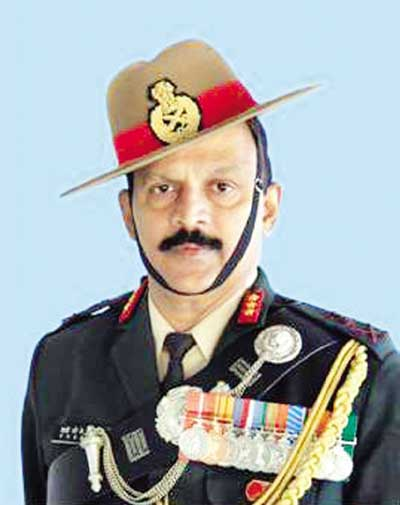
- Military career
- Allegiance: India
- Branch: Indian Army
- Service years: 1981 – 2020
- Rank: Lieutenant General
- Service number: IC-40007M
- Unit: 7/11 Gorkha Rifles
- Commands: IX Corps; 17 Mountain Division
- Conflicts: Operation Meghdoot
- Awards: Ati Vishisht Seva Medal; Sena Medal; Vishisht Seva Medal; Param Vishisht Seva Medal

Lieutenant General Yenduru Venkata Krishna Mohan, PVSM AVSM, SM, VSM is a retired Indian Army general who last served as the Commandant of the Defence Services Staff College. He previously served as the Commander, IX Corps of the Indian Army. He assumed the post after Lt. General Satinder Kumar Saini took over as the GOC-in-C, Southern Command.

== Early life and education ==
Mohan was born in Kurnool, Andhra Pradesh. He is an alumnus of Sainik School, Korukonda, Andhra Pradesh; National Defence Academy, Pune; and Defence Services Staff College, Wellington. He has also attended Royal College of Defence Studies, London.

== Career ==
He was commissioned into the 7th Battalion of 11 Gorkha Rifles in 1981. He has served in various high-altitude areas like Sikkim, Ladakh and Siachen Glacier. He was an Assistant Military Attache in the Indian Embassy in Nepal, Pokhara. He has commanded an infantry brigade in a high-altitude area and 17th Mountain Division (Gangtok). His staff appointments include Assistant Chief Integrated Defence Staff (Joint Operations) at HQ Integrated Defence Staff. His instructional appointments include the commandant of the National Defence College, Delhi and the Defence Services Staff College, Wellington.

During his career, he has been awarded the Vishisht Seva Medal (2015), the Sena Medal during Operation Meghdoot (2005), Ati Vishisht Seva Medal in 2019, and Param Vishisht Seva Medal in 2021 for his service.

== Military awards and decorations ==

Param Vishisht Seva Medal	Sena Medal	Vishisht Seva Medal	Highest Peacetime Medal
Ati Vishisht Seva Medal	Sena Medal	Vishisht Seva Medal	Special Service Medal
Siachen Glacier Medal	Sainya Seva Medal	Operation Parakram Medal	High Altitude Service Medal
50th Anniversary of Independence Medal	30 Years Long Service Medal	20 Years Long Service Medal	9 Years Long Service Medal

Military offices
Preceded by N S Ghei	Commandant of the National Defence College; January 2017 - January 2018	Succeeded by Srikant
Preceded by Satinder Kumar Saini	General Officer Commanding IX Corps; 10 January 2018 – 12 January 2019	Succeeded by J S Nain
Preceded by Amrik Singh	Commandant of the Defence Services Staff College; 13 January 2019 – 31 December 2020	Succeeded by M J S Kahlon
