= Praveen Bakshi =

Lieutenant general of the Indian Army

Lieutenant General Praveen Bakshi PVSM, AVSM, VSM, ADC
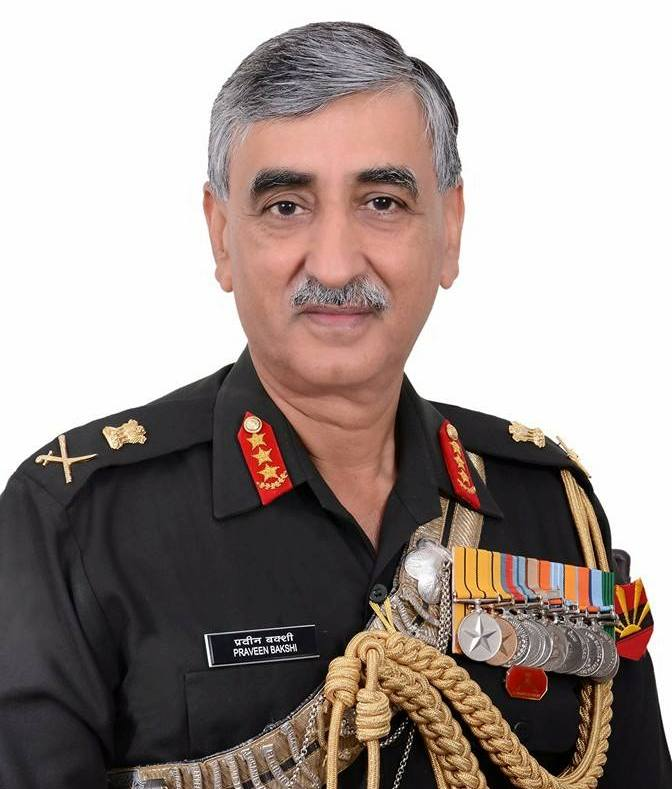
- Military career
- Allegiance: India
- Branch: Indian Army
- Service years: 17 December 1977 – 31 July 2017
- Rank: Lieutenant General
- Service number: IC-34760F
- Unit: Skinner's Horse
- Commands: Eastern Command; IX Corps
- Awards: Param Vishisht Seva Medal; Ati Vishisht Seva Medal; Vishisht Seva Medal

Lieutenant General Praveen Bakshi PVSM, AVSM, VSM, ADC was the 25th General Officer-Commanding-in-Chief Eastern Command of the Indian Army and assumed office on 1 August 2015 after Lieutenant General Man Mohan Singh Rai.

In December 2016, Bakshi was the front runner for the post of the Chief of the Army Staff. However, keeping aside the trend of seniority being the lone criteria, the Government appointed General Bipin Rawat and he finally retired on 31 July 2017 being succeeded by Lieutenant General Abhay Krishna.

Prior, he was Chief of Staff of the Northern Command based at Udhampur. He succeeded Lt Gen Man Mohan Singh Rai who was appointed as the Vice Chief of Army Staff at the Headquarter of Indian Army in New Delhi.

== Education ==
He is an alumnus of National Defence Academy, Pune. He has also attended the staff college course at Defence Services Staff College, Wellington; senior command course at Army War College, Mhow and higher command course at National Defence College, New Delhi.

== Career ==
He was commissioned into the Skinner's Horse regiment on 17 December 1977. He has vast experience headed several formations of Indian Army including an armored brigade in the western sector, a division in Rajasthan and a corps in Punjab and Jammu & Kashmir. On being promoted to the rank of Lieutenant General, he was appointed as the commander of IX Corps (Dharamshala) and later as the Chief of Staff, Northern Command based. He took charge as the GOC-in-C of the Eastern Command on 1 August 2015. He has also served in Tanzania among other places. He was also the Colonel of Skinner's Horse, 18 Cavalry and 57 Armoured Regiment

During his career spanning over decades, he was awarded the Param Vishisht Seva Medal (January 2017), Ati Vishisht Seva Medal (January 2015) and Vishisht Seva Medal (January 2013) for his service.

On 17 December 2016, the Government of India appointed Lt Gen Bipin Rawat as the 27th Chief of the Army Staff, superseding him and Lt Gen Pattiarimal Mohamadali Hariz (Southern Army Commander).The appointment made by NDA ruled Government was politically controversial.General Bipin Rawat was accused of nepotism and gratuitously politicising the appointment, by the senior serving and retired military officers.

== Awards ==

Param Vishisht Seva Medal	Ati Vishisht Seva Medal	Vishisht Seva Medal	Special Service Medal
Operation Vijay Medal	Operation Parakram Medal	Sainya Seva Medal	Videsh Seva Medal
50th Anniversary of Independence Medal	30 Years Long Service Medal	20 Years Long Service Medal	9 Years Long Service Medal

Military offices
Preceded by Man Mohan Singh Rai	General Officer-Commanding-in-Chief Eastern Command; 1 August 2015 - 31 July 2017	Succeeded by Abhay Krishna
Preceded by	General Officer Commanding IX Corps: 30 October 2014	Succeeded by Rajeev Tewari
