= G. M. Nair =

Lieutenant General G. M. Nair PVSM, AVSM, SM, VSM
- Born: 17 January 1952 (age 74); Kerala
- Allegiance: India
- Branch: Indian Army
- Service years: 1972 – 2012
- Rank: Lieutenant General

Lieutenant General G. M. Nair, PVSM, AVSM, SM, VSM (b. 17 January 1952) commanded the Kangra based IX Corps of the Indian Army. His last appointment was as Military Secretary. He replaced Lt. General Avadhesh Prakash who was the Military Secretary.

== Military career ==
A Sainik School, Kazhakootam alumnus, Lt Gen Nair joined the 40th Course of NDA, and was commissioned into 1/11 Gorkha Rifles from Indian Military Academy in 1972. Nair has since held several important positions in the Indian army, including command of the 1/11 Gorkha Rifles during counter insurgency operations in Assam and Manipur, the command of an infantry brigade in the western sector, command of 39 Mountain Division in Jammu and Kashmir and command of 9 Corps in J&K & Punjab. He has participated in several strategic military operations such as Operation Parakram and Operation Rakshak.

For a brief period he held the position of military observer in UN operations in Namibia and Instructor as a brigadier in Army War College, Mhow. Nair holds a MS in Strategic Studies from the US Army War College and has also attended the US Army War College Course in Carlisle. Lt General Nair also holds a Masters in Defence Studies from Madras University, and M Phil in Defence and Management Studies from DAVV, Indore.
