= Southern Command (India) =

Indian Army command

- Insignia of the Southern Command
- Active: 1908–present
- Country: India
- Branch: Indian Army
- Type: Command
- Garrison/HQ: Pune
- Anniversaries: 1 April (Raising Day)

Commanders
- Current commander: Lieutenant General Rajesh Pushkar, AVSM VSM
- Notable commanders: Gen Rajendrasinhji Jadeja; Gen S M Shrinagesh; Gen K S Thimayya; Gen P. N. Thapar; Gen J. N. Chaudhuri; Gen G. G. Bewoor; Gen Om Prakash Malhotra; Gen Bipin Chandra Joshi; Gen Ved Prakash Malik; Gen Sundararajan Padmanabhan; Gen Nirmal Chander Vij; Gen Bipin Rawat; Gen Dhiraj Seth

Insignia
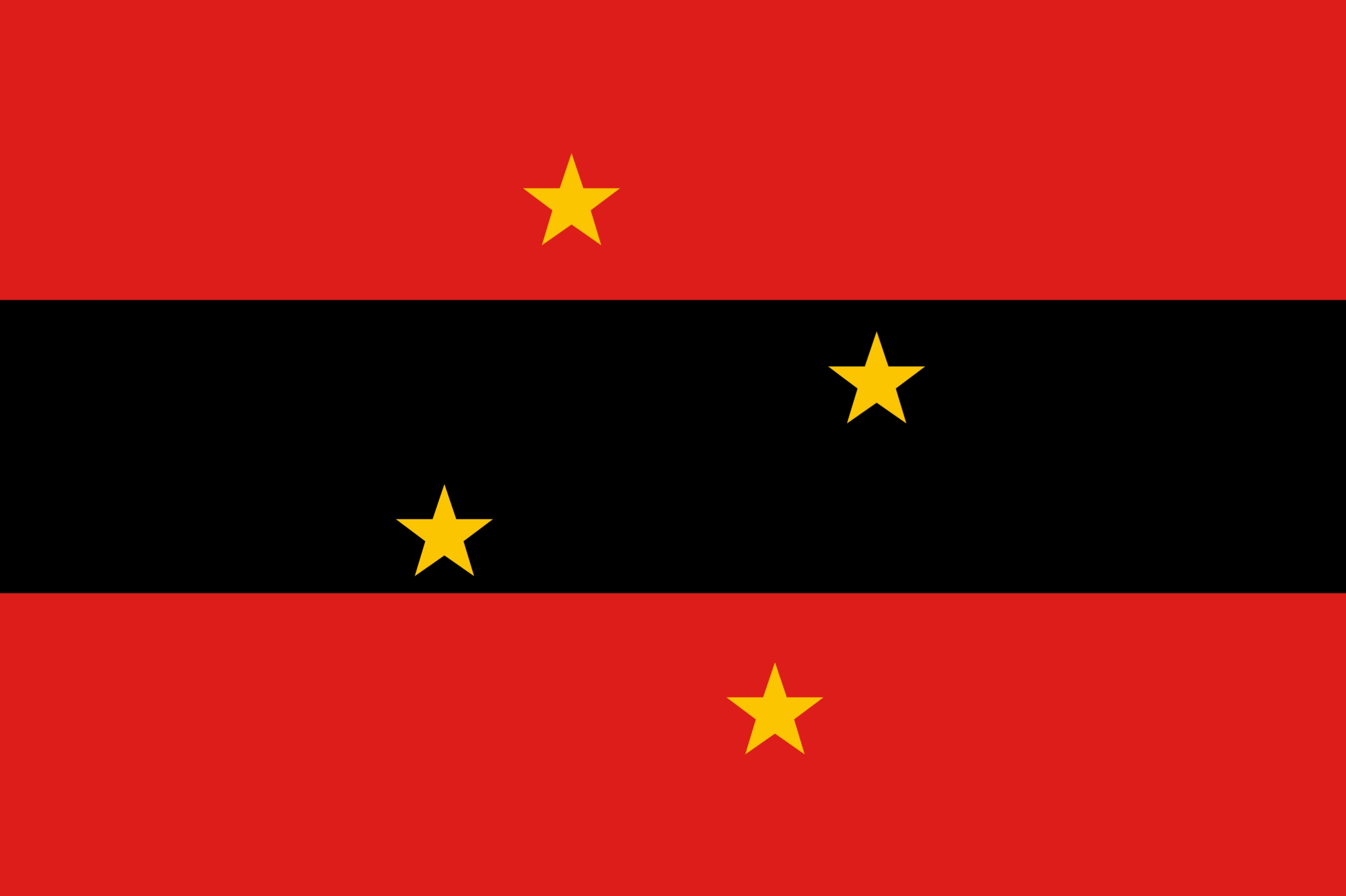
- Flag

Southern Command is a formation of the Indian Army, active since 1895. It has seen action during the integration of several Princely States into modern India, during the 1961 Indian Annexation of Goa, and during the 1965 and 1971 Indo-Pakistani Wars.

Lieutenant General Rajesh Pushkar is the present Southern Army Commander.

== History ==
=== Early history ===
The Presidency armies were abolished with effect from 1 April 1895 when the three Presidency armies became the Indian Army. The Indian Army was divided into four Commands (Bengal Command, Bombay Command, Madras Command and Punjab Command) each under a lieutenant general.

In 1908, the four commands were merged into two Armies (Northern Army and Southern Army): this system persisted until 1920 when the arrangement reverted to four commands again (Eastern Command, Northern Command, Southern Command and Western Command). In 1914, the Southern Army consisted of the 4th (Quetta) Division, the 5th (Mhow) Division, the 6th (Poona) Division, the 9th (Secunderabad) Division, and the Aden Brigade.

=== Second World War ===
During the Second World War, Southern Command was reformed as Southern Army (equivalent to a corps) in April 1942. The formation reverted to the title Southern Command in November 1945.

Component divisions included:

- 19th Indian Infantry Division, April 1942 to July 1944
- 2nd British Infantry Division, June 1942 to April 1943, and then June 1945 to August 1945
- 70th British Infantry Division, July 1943 to October 1943
- 81st (West Africa) Division, March 1945 to August 1945
- 36th Infantry Division (British Army), June 1945 to August 1945

Component brigades included:

- 7th Armoured Brigade, June 1942 to September 1942
- British 6th Infantry Brigade, November 1942 to December 1942
- 150th Indian Infantry Brigade March 1944 to August 1945
- 26th Indian Infantry Brigade July 1944 to December 1944

=== Post war ===
In August 1947, Southern Command had the Deccan, Madras and Bombay Areas (with HQs at Kamptee, Madras and Bombay). In 1947–48, Southern Command was largely responsible in getting Junagadh and Hyderabad to sign the instrument of accession to India. 1st Armoured Division did the actual incursion into Hyderabad. In 1961, the Indian annexation of Goa was conducted by 17th Infantry Division and 50th Parachute Brigade, under the operational control of Southern Command.

In 1965–66, two further divisions were raised within the command. After fighting broke out in the Rann of Kutch in April 1965, a hastily constituted force, named Kilo Force under Maj. Gen P. O. Dunn was formed to contain this attack. Kilo Force was later re-designated as 11 Infantry Division. In September 1965, the operational responsibility for the Barmer sector was given to Southern Command and entrusted to 11 Infantry Division. Delhi and Rajasthan Area, with its Advance Headquarters at Jodhpur, fought in the Indo-Pakistani War of 1965 under Western Command. On 3 November 1966, this formation was re-designated 12th Infantry Division, under Major General J.F.R. Jacob, and also placed under Southern Command.

== Structure ==
The command headquarters is located in Pune, Maharashtra. It consists of two corps and two military areas. The two areas are the Maharashtra Goa and Gujarat Area (MG&G Area) and the Dakshin Bharat Area (renamed). In 2005, changes were made to its area of responsibility when a new South Western Command was established.

Dakshin Bharat Area is a static formation which now provides administrative, logistical, and infrastructural support to military units and establishments in Southern India. It was previously known as the Andhra, Tamil Nadu, Karnataka, and Kerala Area (ATNK&K Area). The current General Officer Commanding is Lieutenant General Karanbir Singh Brar. Its responsibilities include administrative; logistical; and infrastructure support. The area encompasses the states of Andhra Pradesh, Tamil Nadu, Karnataka, and Kerala, as well as the union territories of Puducherry and Lakshadwee.

Structure of Southern Command
Insignia	Corps/Area	Corps/Area HQ	General Officer Commanding	Assigned Units	Unit HQ
	XII Corps (Konark Corps)	Jodhpur, Rajasthan	Lt Gen Aditya Vikram Singh Rathee	11 Infantry Division	Ahmedabad, Gujarat
	XII Corps (Konark Corps)	Jodhpur, Rajasthan	Lt Gen Aditya Vikram Singh Rathee	12 RAPID Division	Jaisalmer, Rajasthan
	XII Corps (Konark Corps)	Jodhpur, Rajasthan	Lt Gen Aditya Vikram Singh Rathee	75 (Independent) Infantry Brigade	Bhuj, Gujarat
	XII Corps (Konark Corps)	Jodhpur, Rajasthan	Lt Gen Aditya Vikram Singh Rathee	4 (Independent) Armoured Brigade	Jaisalmer, Rajasthan
	XII Corps (Konark Corps)	Jodhpur, Rajasthan	Lt Gen Aditya Vikram Singh Rathee	340 (Independent) Mechanized Brigade	Ajmer, Rajasthan
	XXI Corps (Sudarshan Chakra Corps)	Bhopal, Madhya Pradesh	Lt Gen Arvind Chauhan	54 Infantry Division	Secunderabad, Telangana
	XXI Corps (Sudarshan Chakra Corps)	Bhopal, Madhya Pradesh	Lt Gen Arvind Chauhan	36 RAPID Division	Sagar, Madhya Pradesh
	XXI Corps (Sudarshan Chakra Corps)	Bhopal, Madhya Pradesh	Lt Gen Arvind Chauhan	31 Armoured Division	Jhansi, Uttar Pradesh
	XXI Corps (Sudarshan Chakra Corps)	Bhopal, Madhya Pradesh	Lt Gen Arvind Chauhan	41 Artillery Division	Pune, Maharashtra
	XXI Corps (Sudarshan Chakra Corps)	Bhopal, Madhya Pradesh	Lt Gen Arvind Chauhan	475 Engineering Brigade	Nasirabad, Rajasthan
	Maharashtra, Gujarat, and Goa Area	Mumbai, Maharashtra	Lt Gen Dheerendra Singh Kushwah		
	Dakshin Bharat Area	Chennai, Tamil Nadu	Lt Gen V Sreehari		

== Precursors (1907–1948) ==
Following is the List of precursors to the Southern Command and their commanders:

=== Southern Command (1907–1908) ===
General Officer Commanding-in-Chief Southern Command
S.No	Name	Assumed office	Left office	Unit of Commission	References
1	General Sir Archibald Hunter KCB, DSO	June 1907	October 1908	4th (King's Own Royal) Regiment of Foot	

=== Southern Army (1908–1920) ===
General Officer Commanding-in-Chief Southern Army
S.No	Name	Assumed office	Left office	Unit of Commission	References
1	General Sir Edmund G. Barrow KCB	October 1908	October 1912	102nd Regiment of Foot (Royal Madras Fusiliers)	
2	General Sir John E. Nixon KCB	October 1912	February 1915	75th (Stirlingshire) Regiment of Foot	
3	Lieutenant General Sir Robert I. Scallon KCB, KCIE, DSO	February 1915	1916	72nd (Duke of Albany's Own Highlanders) Regiment of Foot	
4	Lieutenant General Sir Charles A. Anderson KCB, KCIE, AM	April 1917	November 1919	Royal Horse Artillery	
5	Lieutenant General Sir William R. Marshall GCMG, KCB, KCSI	November 1919	1920	Sherwood Foresters	

=== Southern Command (1920–1942) ===
General Officer Commanding-in-Chief Southern Command
S.No	Name	Assumed office	Left office	Unit of Commission	References
1	Lieutenant General Sir William R. Marshall GCMG, KCB, KCSI	1920	December 1923	Sherwood Foresters	
2	Lieutenant General Sir Andrew Skeen KCIE, CB, CMG	December 1923	March 1924	King's Own Scottish Borderers	
3	Lieutenant General Sir Harold B. Walker KCB, KCMG, DSO	March 1924	March 1928	Duke of Cornwall's Light Infantry	
4	General Sir William C. G. Heneker KCB, KCMG, DSO	March 1928	March 1932	Connaught Rangers	
5	General Sir George D. Jeffreys KCB, KCVO, CMG	March 1932	March 1936	Grenadier Guards	
6	Lieutenant General Sir Ivo L. B. Vesey KCB, KBE, CMG, DSO	March 1936	October 1937	Queen's Royal Regiment	
7	General Sir John E. S. Brind KCB, KBE, CMG, DSO	October 1937	March 1941	Royal Artillery	
8	Lieutenant General Thomas S. Riddell-Webster CB, DSO	March 1941	October 1941	Cameronians (Scottish Rifles)	
9	General Sir Brodie Haig KCB, MC*	October 1941	June 1942	24th Punjabis	

=== Southern Army (1942–1945) ===
General Officer Commanding-in-Chief Southern Army
S.No	Name	Assumed office	Left office	Unit of Commission	References
1	Lieutenant General Sir Noel M. de la P. Beresford-Peirse KCB, CB, DSO	June 1942	March 1945	Royal Artillery	

== List of GOC-in-C of Southern Command (1945- present) ==
General Officer Commanding-in-Chief Southern Command
S.No	Name	Assumed office	Left office	Unit of Commission	References
1	Lieutenant General Rob Lockhart KCB, CIE, MC	April 1945	15 August 1947	51st Sikhs	
2	Lieutenant General Eric Goddard CB, CIE, CBE, MVO, MC	15 August 1947	1 May 1948	107th Pioneers	
3	Lieutenant General Rajendrasinhji Jadeja DSO	1 May 1948	14 January 1953	2nd Lancers (Gardner's Horse)	
4	Lieutenant General Satyawant M. Shrinagesh	17 January 1953	14 May 1955	19th Hyderabad Regiment	
5	Lieutenant General K. S. Thimayya DSO	15 May 1955	14 September 1956	19th Hyderabad Regiment	
6	Lieutenant General Pran Nath Thapar PVSM	21 January 1957	24 May 1959	1st Punjab Regiment	
7	Lieutenant General Jayanto Nath Chaudhuri OBE	25 May 1959	19 November 1962	7th Light Cavalry	
8	Lieutenant General Lionel Protip Sen DSO	10 May 1963	7 May 1965	10th Baluch Regiment	
9	Lieutenant General Moti Sagar PVSM	8 May 1965	3 July 1969	4th Gorkha Rifles	
10	Lieutenant General Gopal Gurunath Bewoor PVSM	4 July 1969	14 January 1973	Dogra Regiment	
11	Lieutenant General Sartaj Singh GM	27 January 1973	31 July 1974	Regiment of Artillery	
12	Lieutenant General Om Prakash Malhotra PVSM	1 August 1974	19 January 1977	Regiment of Artillery	
13	Lieutenant General A. M. Vohra PVSM	20 January 1977	30 May 1979	3rd Gorkha Rifles	
14	Lieutenant General A. N. Mathur PVSM	31 May 1979	29 June 1980	Corps of Signals	
15	Lieutenant General Ram Dharam Dass Hira PVSM, MVC	30 June 1980	31 August 1981	11th Gorkha Rifles	
16	Lieutenant General Tirath Singh Oberoi PVSM, VrC	1 September 1981	30 November 1984	Parachute Regiment	
17	Lieutenant General Ranjit Singh Dyal PVSM, MVC	14 February 1985	30 November 1986	Parachute Regiment	
18	Lieutenant General Depinder Singh PVSM, VSM	1 December 1986	29 November 1988	8th Gorkha Rifles	
19	Lieutenant General A. K. Chatterjee PVSM, VSM	1 March 1988	31 May 1990	Sikh Light Infantry	
20	Lieutenant General Bipin Chandra Joshi PVSM, AVSM	1 June 1990	14 August 1992	64 Cavalry	
21	Lieutenant General A. S. Kalkat SYSM, PVSM, AVSM, VSM	15 August 1992	31 December 1993	8th Gorkha Rifles	
22	Lieutenant General Moti Dar PVSM, AVSM	1 January 1994	16 July 1995	17th Horse (Poona Horse)	
23	Lieutenant General Ved Prakash Malik PVSM, AVSM	17 July 1995	31 August 1996	Sikh Light Infantry	
24	Lieutenant General H. M. Khanna PVSM, AVSM	1 September 1996	3 January 1999	4th Gorkha Rifles	
25	Lieutenant General Sundararajan Padmanabhan PVSM, AVSM, VSM	4 January 1999	30 September 2000	Regiment of Artillery	
26	Lieutenant General Nirmal Chander Vij PVSM, UYSM, AVSM	1 October 2000	31 September 2001	Dogra Regiment	
27	Lieutenant General Gurbaksh Singh Sihota PVSM, AVSM, VrC, VSM	9 October 2001	29 February 2004	7 Field Regiment	
28	Lieutenant General Balraj Singh Takhar PVSM, AVSM	1 March 2004	31 January 2006	17th Horse (Poona Horse)	
29	Lieutenant General Aditya Singh PVSM, AVSM*	1 March 2006	30 September 2007	9th Deccan Horse	
30	Lieutenant General Noble Thamburaj PVSM, SM	1 October 2007	31 December 2008	Bombay Sappers	
31	Lieutenant General Pradeep Khanna PVSM, AVSM	1 January 2009	28 February 2011	20 Lancers	
32	Lieutenant General Ajay Kumar Singh PVSM, AVSM, SM, VSM	1 March 2011	31 January 2013	7th Light Cavalry	
33	Lieutenant General Ashok Singh PVSM, AVSM, SM, VSM	1 February 2013	31 December 2015	Brigade of the Guards	
34	Lieutenant General Bipin Rawat UYSM, AVSM, YSM, SM, VSM	1 January 2016	31 July 2016	11th Gorkha Rifles	
35	Lieutenant General P. M. Hariz PVSM, AVSM, SM, VSM	1 September 2016	30 November 2017	Mechanised Infantry	
36	Lieutenant General Dewan Rabindranath Soni PVSM, VSM	1 December 2017	1 October 2018	Central India Horse	
37	Lieutenant General Satinder Kumar Saini PVSM, AVSM, YSM, VSM	1 October 2018	24 January 2020	Jat Regiment	
38	Lieutenant General Chandi Prasad Mohanty PVSM, AVSM, SM, VSM	30 January 2020	31 January 2021	Rajput Regiment	
39	Lieutenant General Jai Singh Nain PVSM, AVSM, SM	1 February 2021	31 October 2022	Dogra Regiment	
40	Lieutenant General Ajai Kumar Singh PVSM, AVSM, YSM, SM, VSM	1 November 2022	30 June 2024	11th Gorkha Rifles	
41	Lieutenant General Dhiraj Seth PVSM, UYSM, AVSM	1 July 2024	31 March 2026	2nd Lancers (Gardner's Horse)	
42	Lieutenant General Sandeep Jain AVSM, SM	1 April 2026	30 June 2026	Mahar Regiment	
43	Lieutenant General Rajesh Pushkar AVSM, VSM	1 July 2026	Incumbent	74 Armoured Regiment	

== Sources ==
- Rinaldi, Richard; Rikhye, Ravi (2011). Indian Army Order of Battle. General Data. ISBN 978-0982054178.
