= 27th Infantry Division (India) =

27th Indian Infantry Division
- Active: 1963–present
- Country: India
- Allegiance: India
- Branch: Indian Army
- Type: Infantry
- Size: Division
- Part of: XXXIII Corps
- Garrison/HQ: Kalimpong
- Nickname: "The Striking Lion Division"

Commanders
- Current commander: Major General Rajesh Mishra,SM

The 27th Infantry Division is a formation of the Indian Army headquartered in Kalimpong. It is a part of the Trishakti Corps. The division was converted to a mountain division in 1963 following the war with China in 1962.

== Formation Sign ==
The Formation Sign of the division includes a black background, as other infantry divisions of the Indian Army, with a golden lion, representing the vahana of the Hindu goddess Durga, a symbol of power and valour.
