= Satinder Kumar Saini =

Indian Army general

Lieutenant General Satinder Kumar Saini PVSM, AVSM, YSM, VSM, ADC
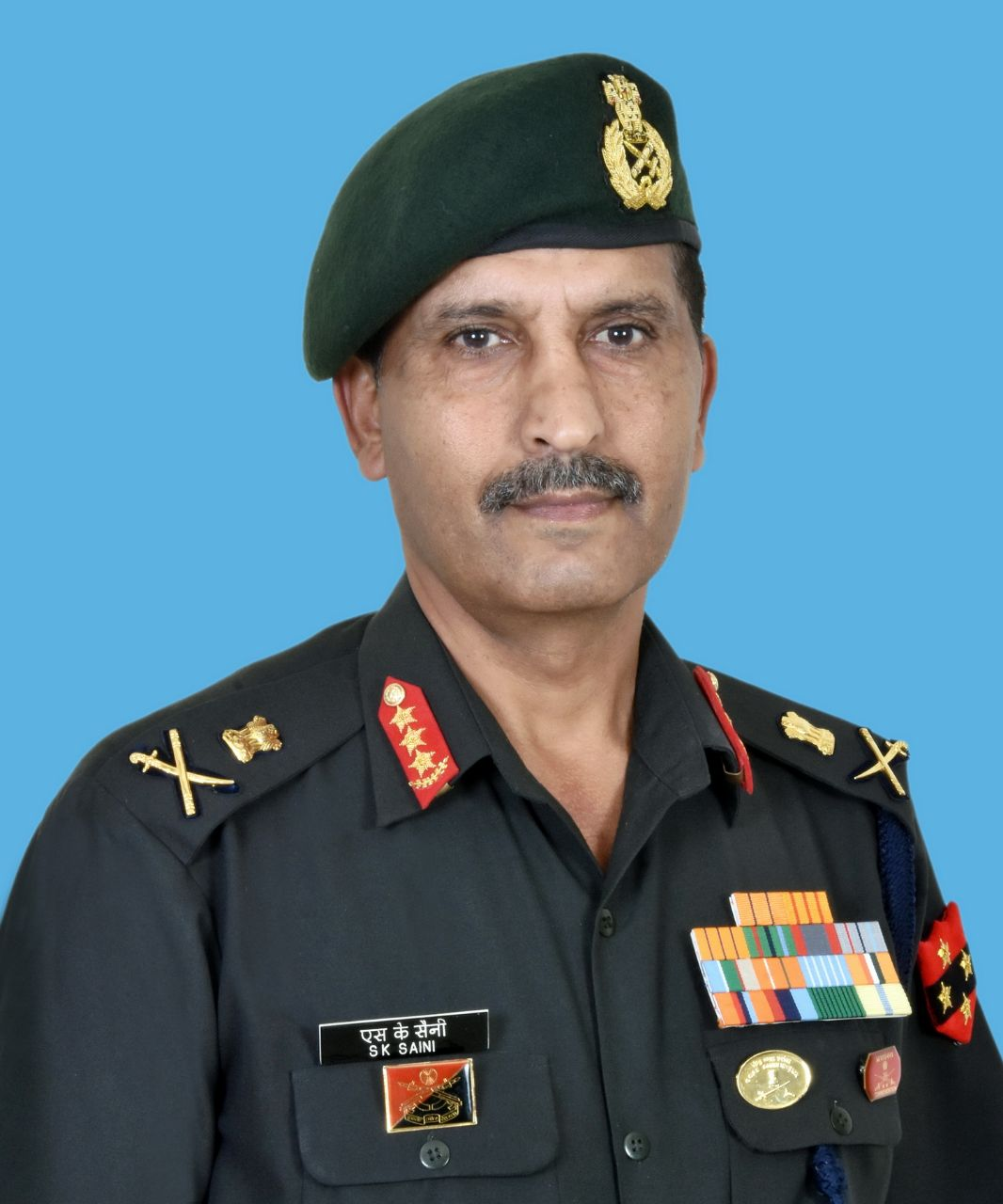

41st Vice Chief of the Army Staff
- In office 25 January 2020 – 31 January 2021
- Chief of Army Staff: Manoj Mukund Naravane
- Preceded by: Manoj Mukund Naravane
- Succeeded by: Chandi Prasad Mohanty

General Officer Commanding-in-Chief Southern Command
- In office 1 October 2018 – 24 January 2020
- Preceded by: Dewan Rabindranath Soni
- Succeeded by: Chandi Prasad Mohanty

Personal details
- Awards: Param Vishisht Seva Medal; Ati Vishisht Seva Medal; Yudh Seva Medal; Vishisht Seva Medal

Military service
- Allegiance: India
- Branch/service: Indian Army
- Years of service: June 1981 – January 2021
- Rank: Lieutenant General
- Unit: 7 Jat
- Commands: Southern Command; IX Corps; Kilo Force; 79(I) Mountain Brigade; 7 Jat
- Service number: IC-39436F

Lieutenant General Satinder Kumar Saini, PVSM, AVSM, YSM, VSM, ADC was the 41st Vice Chief of the Army Staff of the Indian Army and assumed the office on 25 January 2020. He previously served as General Officer Commanding in Chief (GOC-in-C) Southern Command.

== Early life and education ==
Saini is from District Hoshiarpur in Punjab, an alumnus of Sainik School, Kapurthala, National Defence Academy, Pune; and Indian Military Academy, Dehradun. He has also attended the Army Command and Staff Course at Staff College, Camberley; Royal Military College of Science, Shrivenham; and National Defence College, Dhaka. He has a total of three degrees in defence and strategic studies.

== Career ==
Saini was commissioned into the 7th battalion, Jat Regiment in June 1981. His commands include 7 Jat, a Mountain Brigade in the Kashmir Valley, Counter Insurgency Force (Kilo) (part of the Rashtriya Rifles) and IX Corps. The general officer has also held numerous staff appointments including Brigade Major of an infantry brigade, General Staff Officer (Operations) of an infantry division, BGS of a Corps, Director of Military Operations at Army HQ; Director General, Manpower Planning and Personnel Services (MP&PS). He has held different instructor appointments including Senior Directing Staff at National Defence College, Weapons Instructor at National Security Guards Training Center and the Commandant of the Indian Military Academy, Dehradun. He was also The Colonel of the Jat Regiment.

Saini has served on international deputations as well including Deputy Chief Military Personnel Officer in the Iraq- Kuwait UN Mission; Global Peace Operations Initiative's peacekeeping exercise in Mongolia; a counter-terrorism exercise in Australia.

During the 38 years of his service, he has been awarded the Param Vishisht Seva Medal (2020), the Ati Vishisht Seva Medal (2018), the Yudh Seva Medal, the Vishisht Seva Medal, the Chief of Army Staff Commendation and the Army Commander Commendation for his service.

== Honors and decorations ==

Param Vishisht Seva Medal	Ati Vishisht Seva Medal		Yudh Seva Medal
Vishisht Seva Medal	Samanya Seva Medal	Special Service Medal	Operation Vijay Medal
Operation Parakram Medal	Sainya Seva Medal	Videsh Seva Medal	50th Anniversary of Independence Medal
30 Years Long Service Medal	20 Years Long Service Medal	9 Years Long Service Medal	UNIKOM

== Dates of rank ==
Insignia	Rank	Component	Date of rank
	Second Lieutenant	Indian Army	13 June 1981
	Lieutenant	Indian Army	13 June 1983
	Captain	Indian Army	13 June 1986
	Major	Indian Army	13 June 1992
	Lieutenant-Colonel	Indian Army	16 December 2004
	Colonel	Indian Army	1 October 2005
	Brigadier	Indian Army	13 March 2009 (seniority from 4 June 2008)
	Major General	Indian Army	25 October 2013 (seniority from 4 October 2011)
	Lieutenant-General	Indian Army	21 May 2016

Military offices
Preceded by Manoj Mukund Naravane	Vice Chief of the Army Staff; 25 January 2020 – 31 January 2021	Succeeded by Chandi Prasad Mohanty
Preceded by Dewan Rabindranath Soni	General Officer-Commanding-in-Chief Southern Command; 1 October 2018 – 25 January 2020	Succeeded by Chandi Prasad Mohanty
Preceded by Ashok Ambre	General Officer Commanding IX Corps; 4 January 2017 – 9 January 2018	Succeeded by Y V K Mohan
