= Regiment of Artillery of the Nation =

Argentine regiment

The Regiment of Artillery of the Nation (Spanish: Regimiento de Artillería de la Patria) was an Argentine regiment established in 1812 and disbanded in 1820. It fought in the Argentine War of Independence.

== History ==
During the times of the Viceroyalty of the Río de la Plata, the artillery was managed by the "Royal Body of Artillery". The Primera Junta, the government since the May Revolution, disbanded it and created instead the "Regiment of Flying Artillery" on May 29, 1810, relocating some members of the former one.

The "Regiment of Flying Artillery" was disbanded in 1812, and replaced by the "Regiment of Artillery of the Nation", which also reincorporated former members of the "Royal Body of Artillery". It had a total of 12 units, scattered in the territory of Argentina. They also established fixed units at the coast of the Paraná River, to prevent royalist raids from Montevideo.

The Regiment was reorganized in 1814, creating a second battalion, and then a third one that joined the Army of the Andes. This one took part in the Crossing of the Andes that joined the Chilean War of Independence, and saw the establishment of the Chilean artillery. Some of them joined the campaign of José de San Martín in Peru.

The Regiment was disestablished in 1820, and some units were reallocated into the "Artillery of Buenos Aires".
