= 74th Armoured Regiment (India) =

Indian Army regiment

74 Armoured Regiment
- Insignia of 74th Armoured Regiment
- Active: 1972 – present
- Country: India
- Allegiance: India
- Branch: Indian Army
- Type: Armoured Corps
- Size: Regiment
- Nickname: Desert Hawks
- Mottos: 'विजय या वीरगति' 'Vijay Ya Veergati' (Victory or Martyrdom)
- Colors: Steel Grey and Blood Red
- Equipment: T-90
- Decorations: Shaurya Chakra 1 Sena Medal 4

Commanders
- Colonel of the Regiment: Lieutenant General Rajesh Pushkar

Insignia
- Abbreviation: 74 Armd Regt

74 Armoured Regiment is an armoured regiment of the Indian Army.

== Formation ==
The 74 Armoured Regiment was raised on 1 June 1972 at Ahmednagar by Lieutenant Colonel KS Khajuria. The class composition of the regiment is Sikhs, Ahirs and Dogras.

== History ==
The Regiment was presented the President's Standard on 27 November 2011 by the then President of India Mrs Prathiba Patil. 74 Armoured Regiment along with four other Armoured Regiments of the 1 Armoured Division were presented with the colours in Patiala.

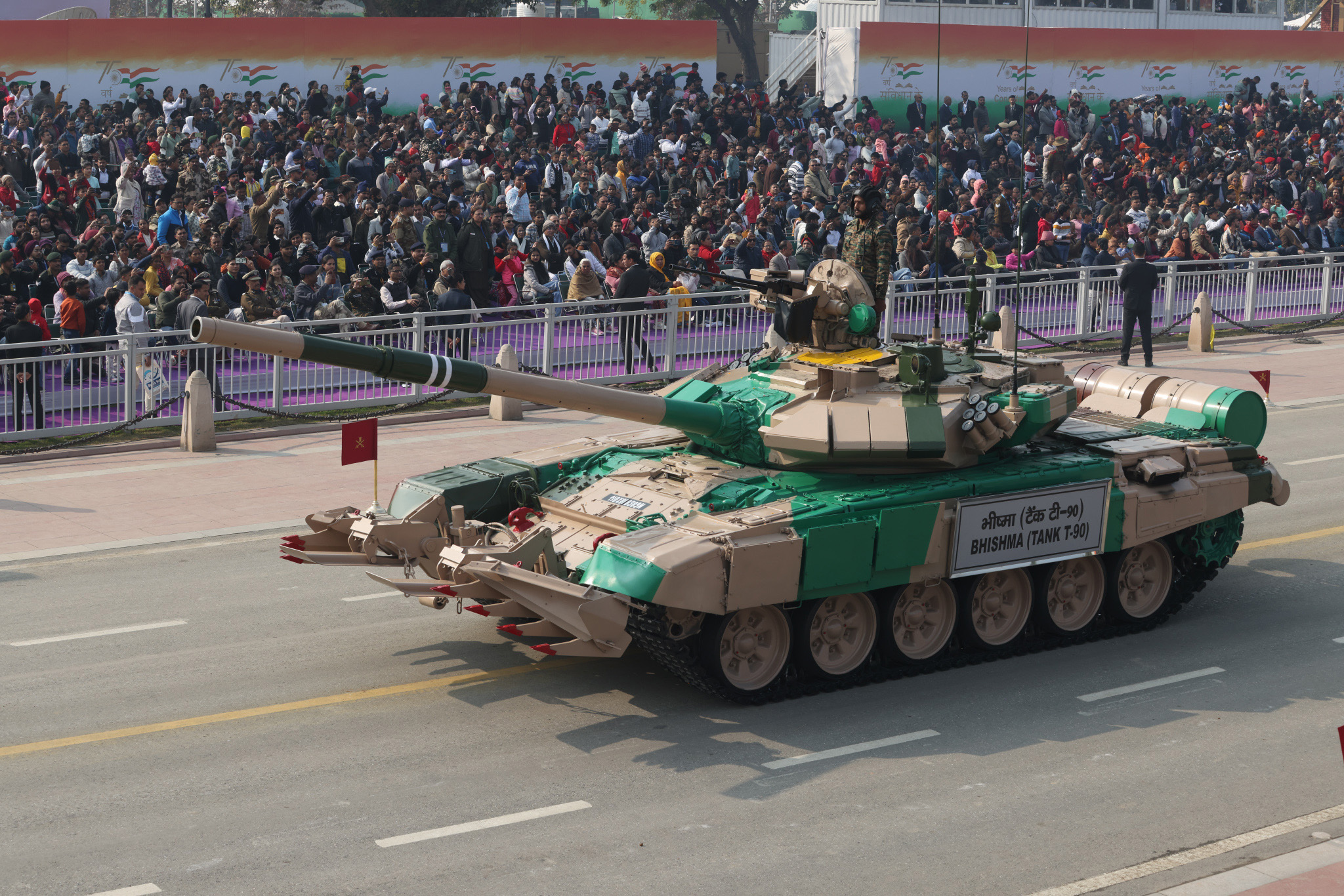
T-90 tank of the regiment during the dress rehearsal of the Republic Day Parade, 2025

The regiment had the honour to participate in the Republic Day Parade in 2025 with its T-90 tanks.

== Equipment ==
The Regiment is presently equipped with the T-90 tanks.

== Operations and awards ==
It has participated in all major operations since it formation. Personnel from the unit have been awarded the following awards-

- Param Vishisht Seva Medal - 1
- Shaurya Chakra - 1
- Sena Medal - 4
- Vishisht Seva Medal - 1
- Chief of Army Staff Commendation Cards - 8
- Vice Chief of Army Staff Commendation Cards - 2
- GOC-in-C Commendation Cards - 75
- Director General (National Security Guard) Commendation Certificate and Disc - 1
- Chief of Integrated Defence Staff Commendation Card - 1
- United Nations Force Commander Commendation Card - 2

== Regimental Insignia ==
The Regimental badge comprises a tank hull with a mailed fist on it representing the 'weapon' and the 'punch of armour'. The numeral "74" is inscribed on the hull. The hull with track rests on a wave with the Regimental motto 'विजय या वीरगति' ('Vijay Ya Veergati', which means Victory or Martyrdom) engraved on it. The colours of the Regiment are Steel Grey and Blood Red.

== Notable servicemen ==
- The author Lieutenant Colonel Rohit Agarwal was commissioned into 74 Armoured Regiment in 1989.
- Lieutenant General Rajesh Pushkar - General Officer Commanding 2 Corps
