= Nav Kumar Khanduri =

Lieutenant General in the Indian Army

Lieutenant General Nav Kumar Khanduri PVSM, AVSM, VSM
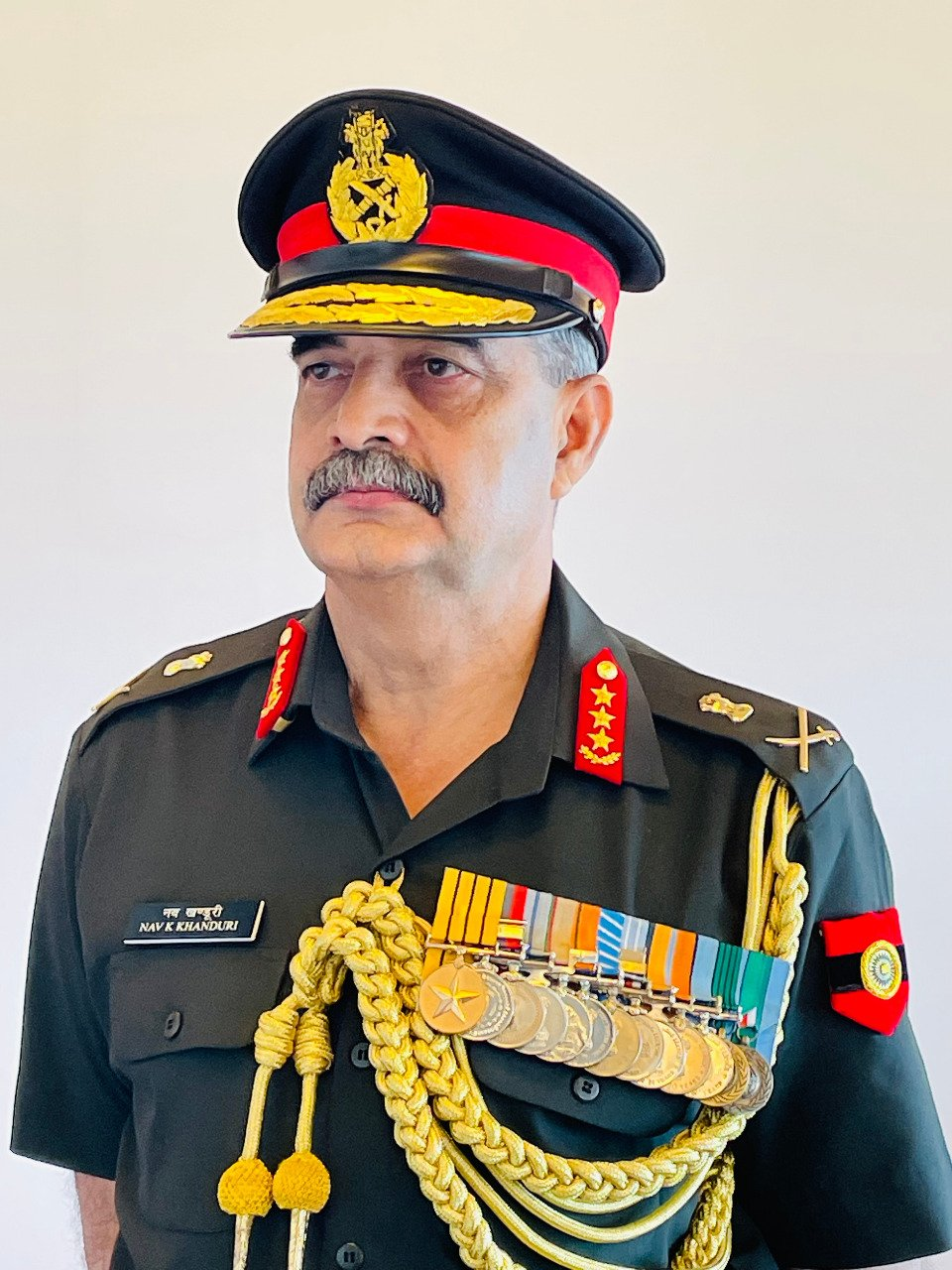
- Alma mater: National Defence Academy; Indian Military Academy; Defence Services Staff College
- Military career
- Allegiance: India
- Branch: Indian Army
- Service years: December 1983 – June 2023
- Rank: Lieutenant-General
- Service number: IC-41495M
- Units: 27 Air Defence Regiment (Corps of Army Air Defence)
- Commands: Western Command; XXIII Corps; 15 Infantry Division
- Awards: Ati Vishisht Seva Medal; Vishisht Seva Medal

Lieutenant General Nav Kumar Khanduri PVSM, AVSM, VSM is a retired general officer in the Indian Army, and the former General Officer Commanding-in-Chief of the Western Command since November 2021. He is the first officer from the Corps of Army Air Defence to become an army commander.

== Biography ==
An alumnus of Rashtriya Indian Military College, Dehradun and the National Defence Academy, Khadakwasla, Khanduri passed out with the 73rd Regular Course from the Indian Military Academy, Dehradun and was commissioned into 27 AD Missile Regiment (Amritsar Airfield) on 17 December 1983. He commanded an air defence brigade in Operation Rakshak and a mountain brigade in Operation Falcon. He served as an instructor at the College of Defence Management, Secunderabad and has held various staff appointments in field, high altitude and Integrated Headquarters postings.

Khanduri has also served with the Indian Military Training Team in Bhutan, as a United Nations Military Observer with the United Nations Transitional Authority in Cambodia and as Deputy Chief Integrated Service Support with the United Nations Mission in Ivory Coast. He commanded 15 Infantry Division, and was subsequently appointed Director General Operational Logistics and Strategic Movement before assuming command of XXXIII Corps in September 2019. On 30 June 2023, he formally retired from the Army.

== Awards and decorations ==
He was awarded the Vishisht Seva Medal in the 2016 Republic Day decorations list, the Ati Vishisht Seva Medal in the 2021 Republic Day decorations list and the Param Vishisht Seva Medal in 2023.

Param Vishisht Seva Medal	Ati Vishisht Seva Medal	Vishisht Seva Medal	Special Service Medal
Operation Vijay Medal	Operation Parakram Medal	Sainya Seva Medal	High Altitude Service Medal
Videsh Seva Medal	75th Anniversary of Independence Medal	50th Anniversary of Independence Medal	30 Years Long Service Medal
20 Years Long Service Medal	9 Years Long Service Medal	United Nations Operation in Côte d'Ivoire	UN Transitional Authority, Cambodia

== Dates of rank ==
Insignia	Rank	Component	Date of rank
	Second Lieutenant	Indian Army	17 December 1983
	Lieutenant	Indian Army	17 December 1985
	Captain	Indian Army	17 December 1988
	Major	Indian Army	17 December 1994
	Lieutenant-Colonel	Indian Army	16 December 2004
	Colonel	Indian Army	15 March 2006
	Brigadier	Indian Army	18 March 2011 (with seniority from 1 September 2009)
	Major General	Indian Army	3 April 2016 (with seniority from 23 August 2014)
	Lieutenant-General	Indian Army	1 September 2018

Military offices
Preceded by Ravendra Pal Singh	General Officer Commanding-in-Chief Western Command; 1 November 2021–30 June 2023	Succeeded by Manoj Kumar Katiyar
Preceded by Chandi Prasad Mohanty	General Officer Commanding XXXIII Corps; 13 September 2019–13 September 2020	Succeeded by Ajai Kumar Singh
