= 1st Horse (Skinner's Horse) =

Indian Army regiment

- Post-1950 Cap Badge
- Active: 1803–present
- Country: India
- Allegiance: British India (1803-1947); Dominion of India (1947–1950); India (1950–present)
- Branch: British Indian Army (1803–1947); Indian Army (1947–present)
- Type: Cavalry
- Size: Regiment
- Nickname: Yellow Boys
- Motto: Himmat e Mardaan Madad e Khuda (The bravery of man is by the help of God)
- Equipment: T-72 tanks
- Engagements: First Afghan War; Battle of Ghazni; Battle of Jellalabad; Battle of Kabul; Bhurtpore 1842; First Sikh War; Battle of Moodkee; Battle of Ferozeshah; Battle of Aliwal; Battle of Sobraon; Second Sikh War; Battle of Ramnagar; Battle of Chillianwala; Battle of Gujrat; Second Afghan War; Kandahar 1878–80; Afghanistan1878; Boxer Rebellion; Battle of Peking; World War I France and Flanders; Defence of Gumbaz; World War II; East African Campaign; Battle of Keren; Amba Alagi; Western Desert Campaign; Agordat; Abyssinia; Senio Flood Bank; Italian Campaign; Post Independence; Operation Polo; Indo-Pakistani War of 1965; Indo-Pakistani War of 1971

Commanders
- Colonel of the Regiment: Gen Dhiraj Seth
- Notable commanders: Colonel James Skinner; Lt Gen Praveen Bakshi; Gen Dhiraj Seth

Insignia
- Identification symbol: 1 Horse

The 1st Horse (Skinner's Horse) is a regiment of the Armoured Corps of the Indian Army. It traces its origins as a cavalry regiment from the times of the East India Company, followed by its service in the British Indian Army and finally, after independence as the fourth oldest and one of the senior cavalry regiments of the Armoured Corps of the Indian Army.

== Formation ==
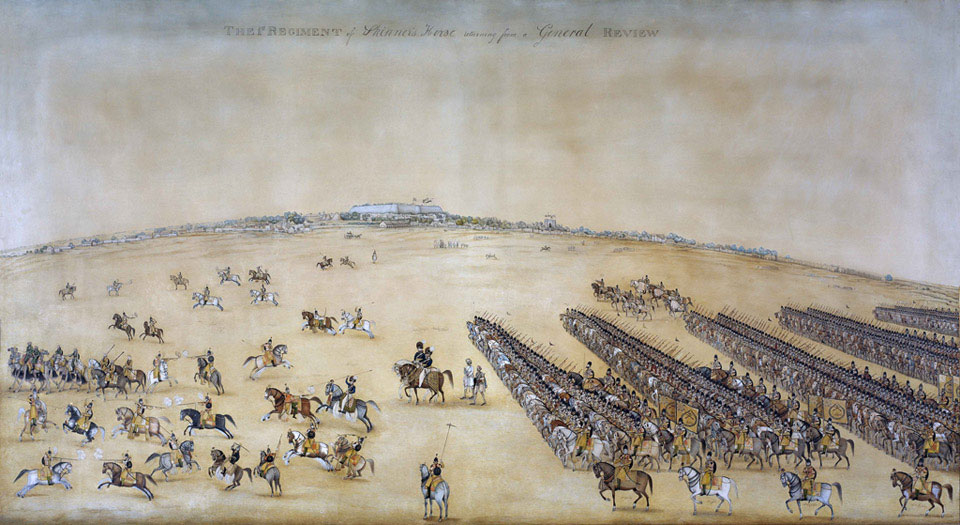
1st Regiment of Skinner's Horse returning from a General Review

After the Anglo-Maratha War of 1803, James Skinner ("Sikander Sahib") was dismissed from service by Daulat Rao Sindhia and was recruited by Lord Lake, who asked him to raise a regiment of 'Irregular Cavalry'. On February 23, 1803, the regiment was raised at Hansi, Haryana in the service of the East India Company. The initial contingent consisted of 800 men of Perron's Horse, who were under service of the Scindia, all of whom were old Muslims comrades of James Skinner. Skinner was one of a certain group of officers, such as Gardner and Hearsay, who had become British leaders of irregular cavalry that preserved the traditions of cavalry of the Mughal empire, which had a political purpose because it absorbed pockets of cavalrymen who might otherwise have become disaffected plunderers. Herber writes: "Altogether the dress, arms and appearance would lead any one versed in Indian history to believe Skinner's Horse to be the descendants of the conquering Moguls of Timour."

A second regiment of Indian Cavalry was raised by Colonel James Skinner in 1814, which became the 3rd Skinner's Horse. On the reduction of the Indian Army in 1922, 1st and 3rd Regiments were amalgamated and became Skinner's Horse (1st Duke of York's Own Cavalry) and later the 1st Duke of York's Own Lancers (Skinner's Horse). The regiment took its present designation in 1950.

== Class composition ==
=== Early 1800s ===
During its early years, the 1st regiment of Skinner's Horse recruited men from Haryana and Doaba areas. The recruits was mainly composed of Ranghars (Muslim Rajputs), Syeds, Moghuls, and localized Pathans from Delhi, Haryana and Western U.P. with a few Rajputs and Brahmins. Thus the regiment was a predominantly Indian Muslim unit.

=== After the Indian Rebellion of 1857 ===
In 1864, it had three squadrons (six troops) and the composition was changed, so that there was one troop each of Muslim, Dogras, Sikhs, Jats, Rajputs and Brahmins. In 1885, a squadron (consisting of 2 troops) of Sikhs were added. In 1887, the regiment had one squadron each of Sikhs, Jats, Ranghars and half a squadron each of Rajputs and Hindustani Muslims. Later the composition was changed to one squadron each of Sikhs, Jats, Rajputs (from Eastern Punjab and Jodhpur) and Muslim Rajputs. By the end of the Great War, the regiment had four squadrons of Hindustani Muslims, one each of Moghuls, Ranghars (Muslim Rajputs), Syeds and localized Pathans recruited from Delhi, Haryana and Western United Provinces. The 3rd regiment had a similar composition. In 1927, following the amalgamation of the regiment, the troops were Jats, Rajputs and Ranghars mainly from Gurgaon, Rohtak and Hissar. Post partition, Hindustani Muslim and Ranghar squadrons of the Skinner's Horse were given to the Pakistan Armoured Corps in exchange of a Sikh Squadron from 19th King George V's own Lancers. The regiment presently recruits Jats, Sikhs and Rajputs.

== Lineage ==
=== 1st Lancers ===
- 1803 Captain Skinner's Corps of Irregular Horse
- 1823 1st Regiment of Local Horse
- 1840 1st Bengal Irregular Cavalry
- 1861 1st Regiment of Bengal Cavalry
- 1896 1st Regiment of Bengal Lancers
- 1899 1st (The Duke of York's Own) Regiment of Bengal Lancers
- 1901 1st (Duke of York's Own) Bengal Lancers (Skinner's Horse)
- 1903 1st Duke of York's Own Lancers (Skinner's Horse)

=== 3rd Skinner's Horse ===
- 1814 Second Corps of Lieutenant-Colonel Skinner's Irregular Horse
- 1821 Baddeley's Frontier Horse
- 1823 4th Regiment of Local Horse
- 1840 4st Bengal Irregular Cavalry
- 1861 3rd Regiment of Bengal Cavalry
- 1901 3rd Bengal Cavalry (Skinner's Horse)
- 1903 3rd Skinner's Horse

=== Post amalgamation ===
- 1921 1st-3rd Cavalry

== Early history ==
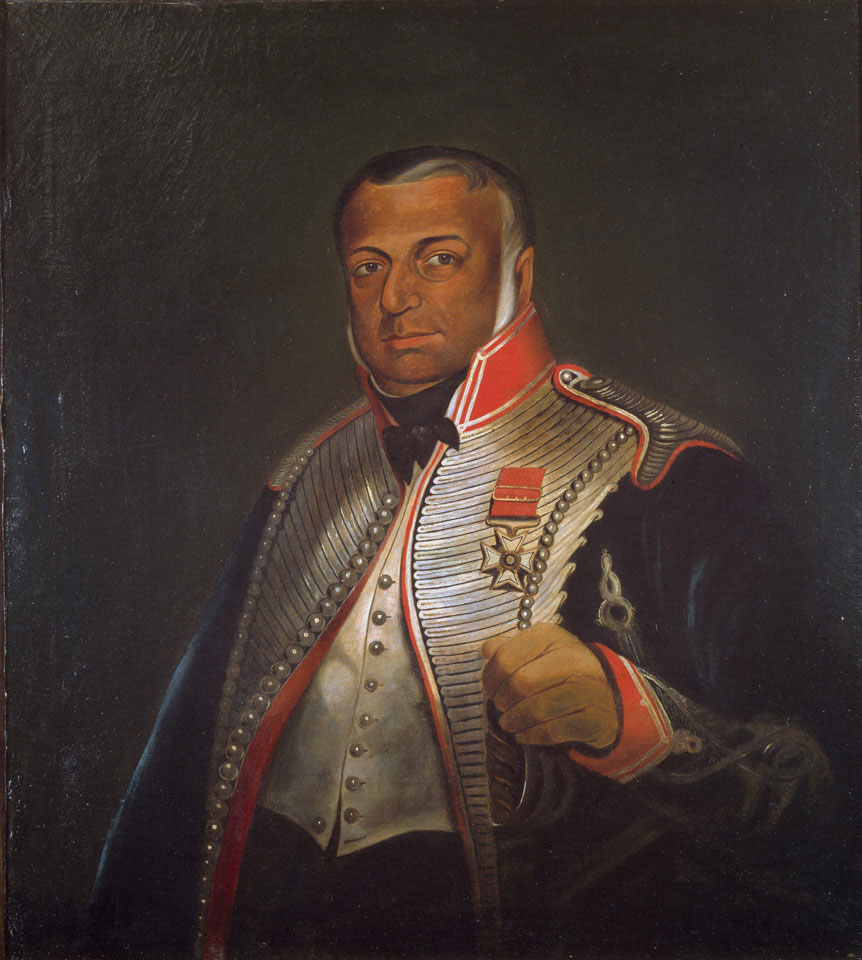
Colonel James Skinner

After its formation in 1803, the regiment was involved in a number of the campaigns on the Indian subcontinent, notably the Siege of Bharatpur, the First Afghan War, the Second Afghan War, the First Anglo-Sikh War and the Second Sikh War. In 1842, a detachment of the regiment lost 108 men out of 180 engaged in a clash at Kandahar. The 1st Skinner's Horse remained loyal during the Indian Mutiny of 1857, seeing service in the Ravi River district and distinguishing itself at Chichawatni.

It was the first Indian Army regiment sent overseas during the Boxer Rebellion and participated in the Battle of Peking. During this campaign the regiment clashed with Tartar cavalry and served alongside United States units – the first occasion where British Indian and US troops served together.

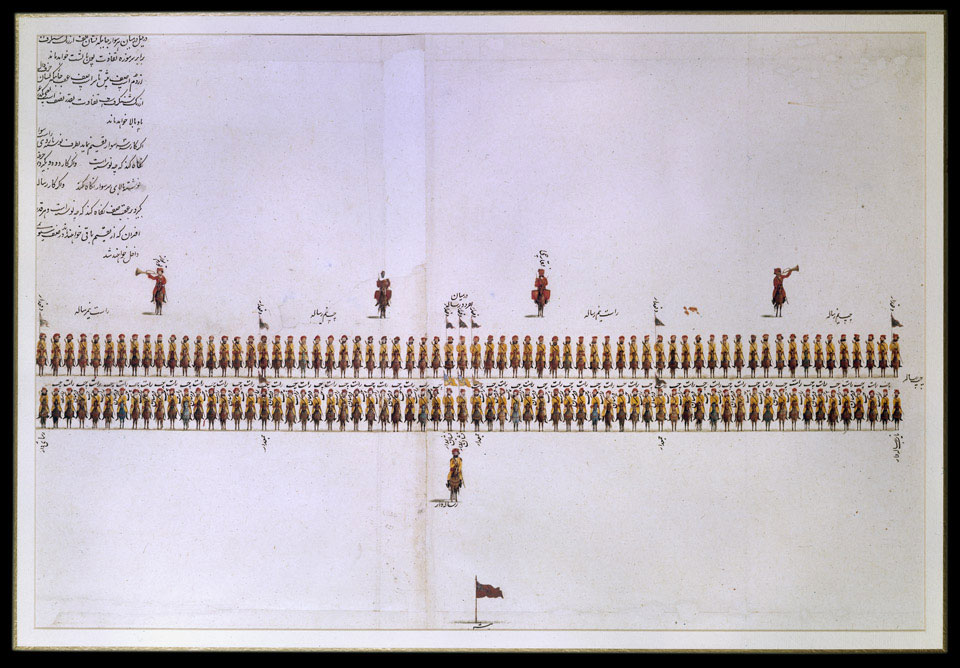
Regiment formed in line, from the Book of Rules for the Manoeuvres of the Hindustani Musket Cavalry formed by Colonel James Skinner

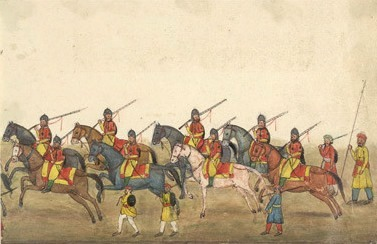
Skinner's Horse party, in a folio from the Delhi Book, or 'Reminiscences of Imperial Delhi', an album by Sir Thomas Metcalfe, 1843

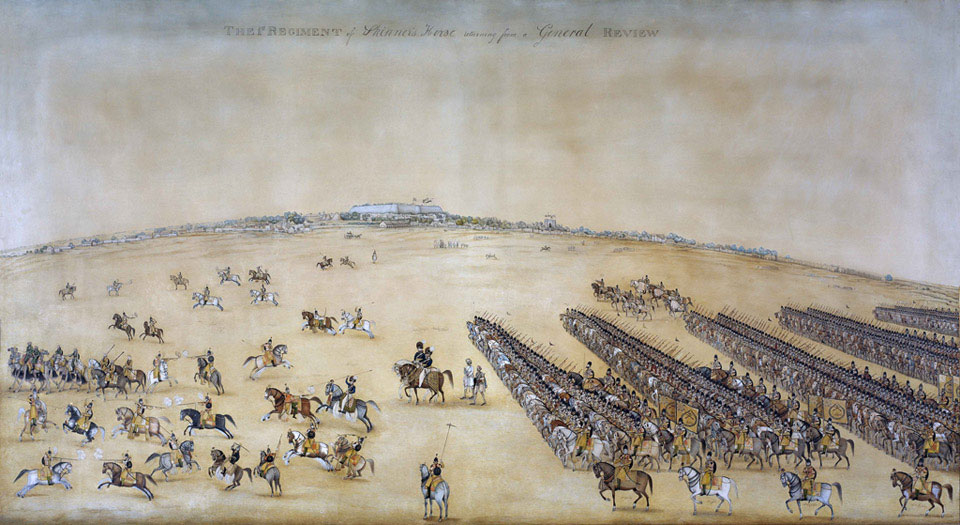
1st Regiment of Skinner's Horse returning from a General Review, 1828

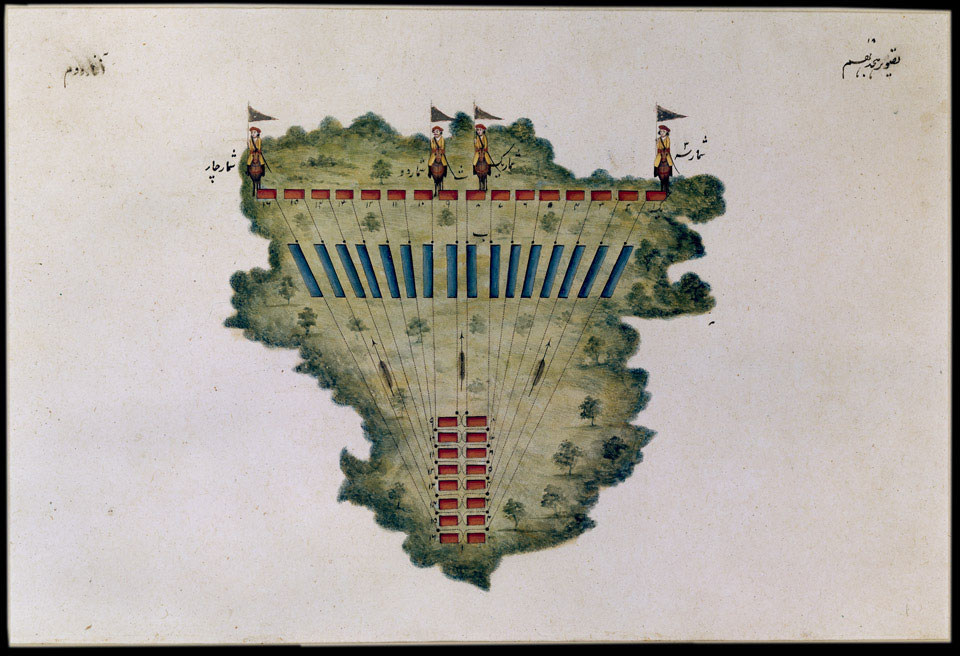
Positions for the manoeuvre of the regiment from a column to a line, 1824

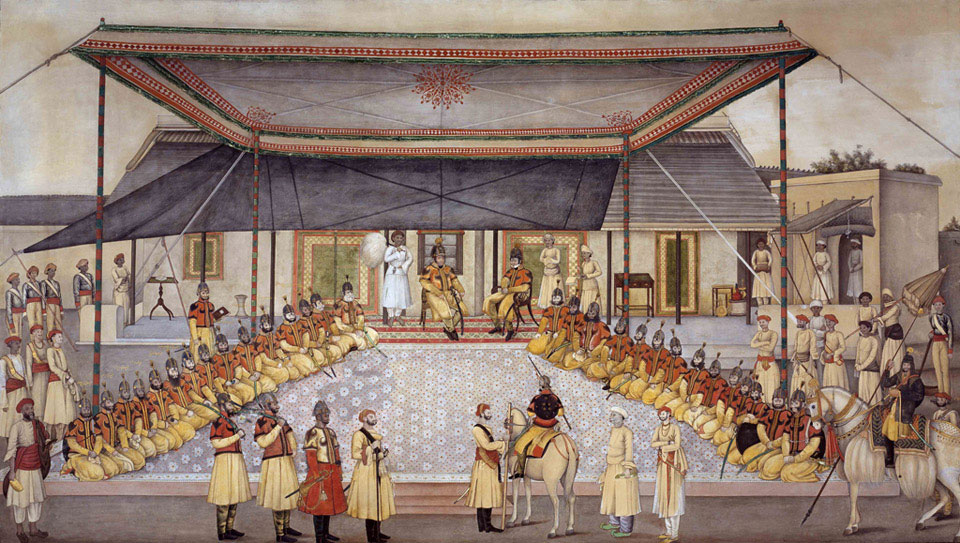
Colonel James Skinner holding a Regimental Durbar, 1827

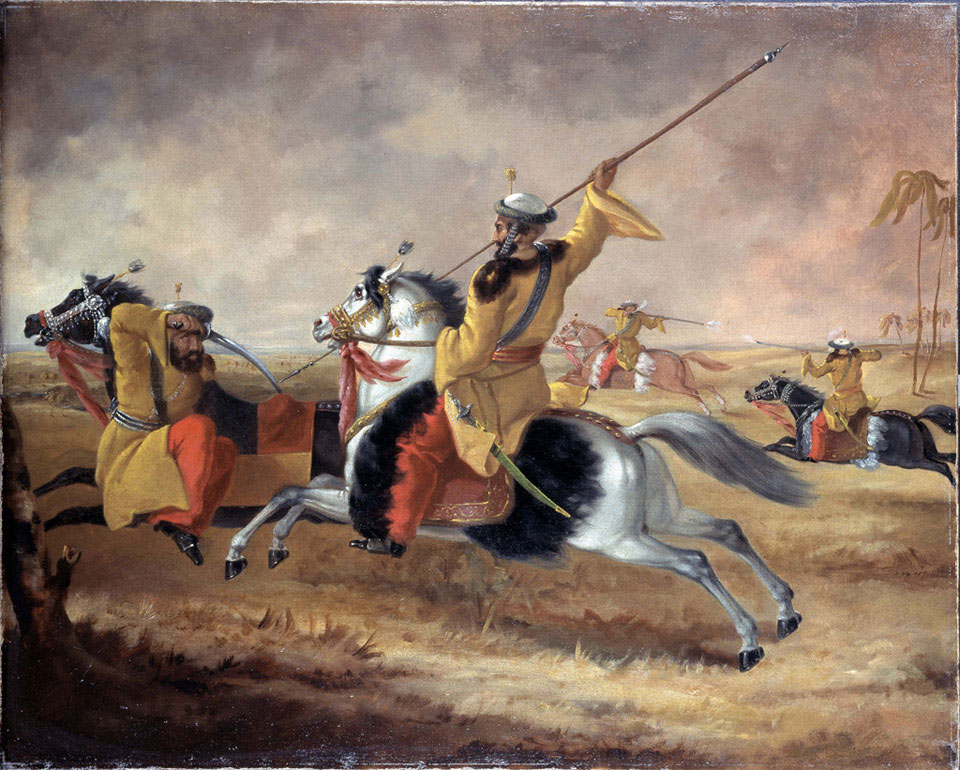
Skinner's Horse at Exercise, 1840 (c)

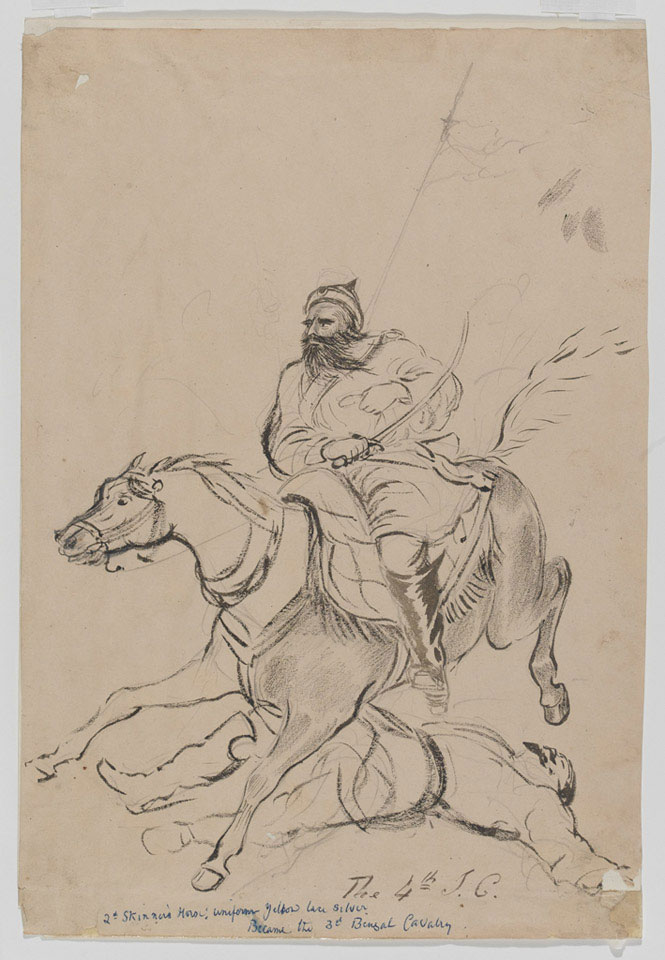
Skinner's Horse, by Ensign Bethune Donald Grant

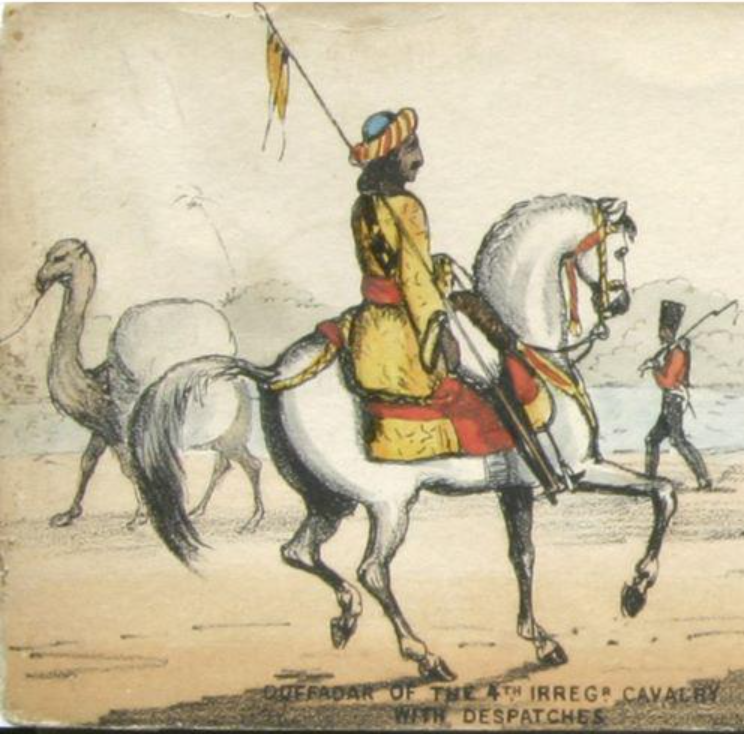
Officer in the 4th Irregular Cavalry

== World War I ==
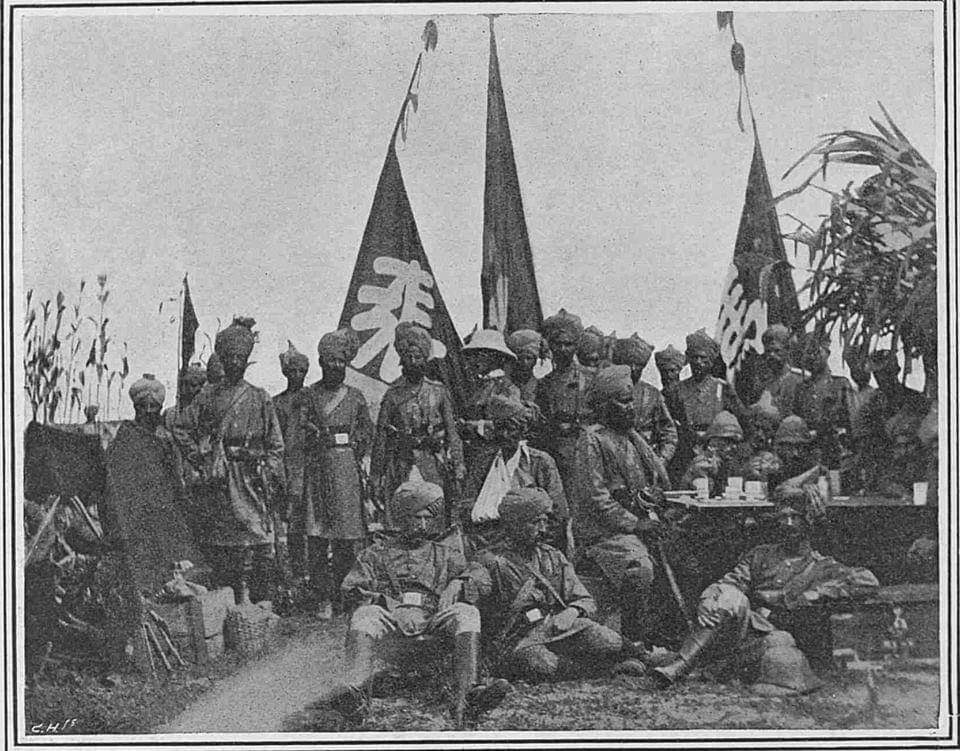
1st Bengal Lancers, Boxer's Rebellion, 1900

The 1st regiment remained at the North-West Frontier of British India throughout the war. The 3rd regiment had been stationed in Meerut when the war broke out. The regiment was a part of the 7th (Meerut) Cavalry Brigade, 2nd Indian Cavalry Division. The brigade received orders to mobilise on 24 October 1914. It sailed from Bombay and reached Marseilles port in France by 15 December 1914.

The regiment was in France till August 1916. It saw extensive action in many parts of France. It was awarded the battle honours France and Flanders for its fine performance. It was sent to Mesopotamia as a part of the 7th Meerut Cavalry Brigade Headquarters. The regiment was then ordered back to India where it concentrated in Rawalpindi in August 1916 for operations in Afghanistan. A detachment of the regiment was tasked to guard the post at Gumboz and held against the attack by the Marris on 17 February 1918.

The regiment won the following gallantry awards –

- Companion of the Indian Empire : Risaldar Habibur Rahman Khan (1st regiment).
- Military Cross : Jemadar Ami Lal (3rd regiment).
- Order of British India : Risaldar Mardan Khan, Risaldar Nathe Khan, Risaldar Major Muhammad Akham Khan (1st regiment); Risaldar Major Balwant Singh (3rd regiment).
- Indian Order of Merit : Risaldar Faiz Muhammad Khan, Jemadar Muhammad Umar Faruk Khan (1st regiment); Dafadar Lal Singh, Lance Dafadar Khem Singh, Jemadar Indar Singh, Dafadar Jawahir Singh (3rd regiment).
- Indian Distinguished Service Medal : Sowar Nishan Ali, Jemadar Raknuddin, Trumpeter Abdul Majid Khan, Sowar Ghulam Muhammad Khan, Lance Dafadar Ali Hussain, Jemadar Muhammad Tagi Khan (1st regiment); Dafadar Gurdiyall Singh, Acting Lance Dafadar Pritam Singh, Sowar Chhaja Singh (3rd regiment).
- Indian Meritorious Service Medal : Sowar Sabr Ali Khan, Sowar Abdul Shakoor Khan, Dafadar Hadiyar Khan, Dafadar Ashrafulla Khan (1st regiment); Dafadar Chhaja Singh, Sowar Pakbar Singh, Dafadar Nand Singh, Lance Dafadar Nahar Singh (3rd regiment).
- Croix de Guerre (French) : Dafadar Zahur Ali (3rd regiment).
- Bronze Medal of Military Valor (Italian) : Dafadar Kutab Khan (3rd regiment).
- Crucea Servicul Credincois (Romanian) : Sowar Pretam Singh (3rd regiment).

== Interwar period ==
After World War I, the cavalry of the British Indian Army was reduced from thirty-nine regiments to twenty-one. On 18 May 1921, the two regiments of Skinner's Horse were amalgamated at Sialkot with the new title of the 1st Duke of York's Own Skinner's Horse. Each of the squadrons was equipped with one Hotchkiss gun and with .303 Short Magazine Lee–Enfield rifles. The machine gun troops of the Headquarters Squadron were equipped with the .303 Vickers machine gun. The traditional sillidar-system of most of the cavalry was abolished shortly after World War I and Indian troopers were now provided with government horses rather than having to provide the animals themselves in return for a higher rate of pay. The Skinner's Horse accordingly acquired the status of a fully regular regiment of the British Indian Army and received standard government-issue equipment for all purposes.

== World War II ==
At the beginning of World War II the regiment was still mounted, but was quickly converted to act as a mechanised reconnaissance regiment and was attached to the 5th Indian Division and when the division was sent to the Sudan, formed part of Gazelle Force.

During the rest of the war the regiment was attached variously to the 4th Indian Infantry Division; the British 10th Armoured Division, the 3rd Indian Motor Brigade and the 10th Indian Infantry Division. The regiment fought in East Africa, North Africa and Italy and was awarded battle honours for Agordat, Keren, Amba-Alagi, Abyssinia, Senio Flood Bank and Italy. The senior Pakistani politician Sardar Shaukat Hayat Khan (1915–1998), who served with Skinner's Horse in Sudan/Africa during the Second World War, has written a brief but memorable account of the regiment's service there, in his memoirs, "The Nation that Lost its Soul" (Lahore: Jang Pubs, 1995).

The regiment won the following gallantry awards –

- Distinguished Service Order (DSO) : Lieutenant Colonel IF Hossack.
- Military Cross : Captain RP Prentice, Lieutenant RE Coaker.
- Indian Order of Merit : Risaldar Mohd Yunus Khan.
- Indian Distinguished Service Medal : Risaldar Amar Singh, Lance Dafadar Dip Chand, Lance Dafadar Mohd Sharif Khan, Lance Dafadar Bhure Khan, Sowar Munshi Singh, Sowar Raj Singh, Sowar Sardar Singh.
- Mentioned in dispatches : Lieutenant Colonel IF Hossack, Lieutenant Colonel T Scott, Captain HT Addams Williams, Lieutenant RE Coaker, Risaldar Major Bhanu Singh, Risaldar Mohammed Yunus Khan, Lance Dafadar Bhure Khan, Lance Dafadar Abdul Hakim, Lance Dafadar Munshi Khan, Lance Dafadar Feroze Khan, Lance Dafadar Ikram-ud-din, Sowar Raj Singh.

== Post War ==
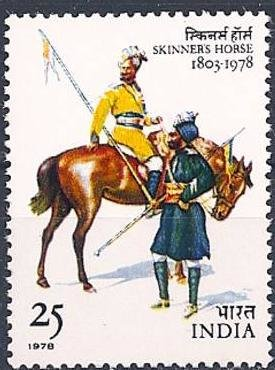
1978 postage stamp on the 175th anniversary

The regiment was switched to tanks in 1946, receiving the Stuart tank, and a year later Churchills. In 1947 with the Indian independence, the regiment became part of the Indian Army Armoured Corps. The first Indian commander was Lieutenant Colonel RM Bilimoria, and the regiment was stationed at Ahmednagar.

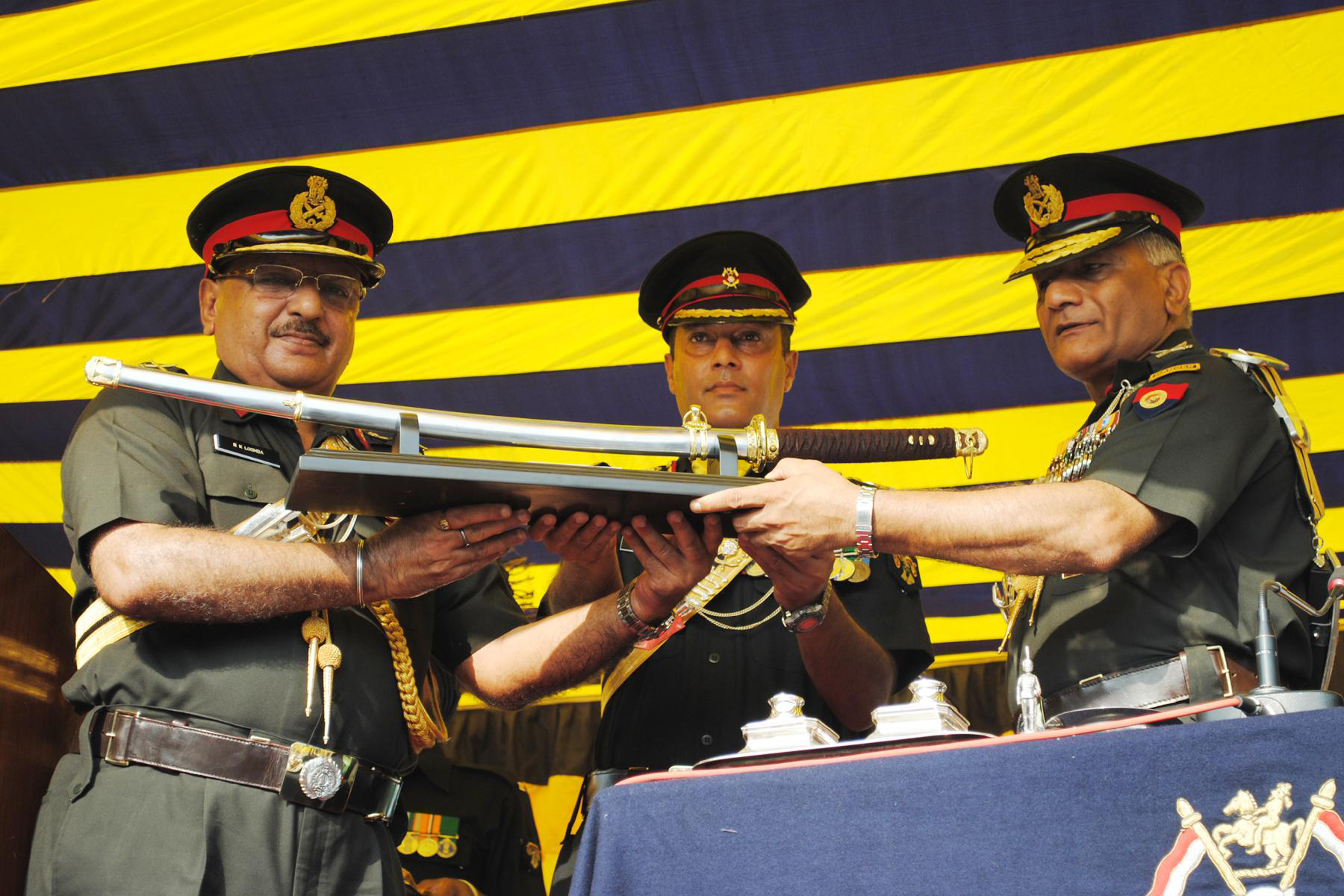
The COAS General VK Singh, being presented a sword on being appointed Honorary Colonel of the Regiment of the Skinner's Horse, in Meerut on 1 October 2010

Hyderabad Police Action

The regiment took part in the annexation of Hyderabad in 1948, following which it stopped the use of Stuart tanks. The Churchill tank remained in use until 1957, after which the regiment was equipped with Sherman Mk IV's.

Indo-Pakistani War of 1965

In 1965, equipped with Sherman tanks, the unit's B Squadron supported 50th Parachute Brigade near Dograi and 2 troops helped 3 Jat in the epic battle of Dograi. Eight years later, in 1965 the regiment converted to the T-54 and then to the T-55.

Indo-Pakistani War of 1971

The regiment with its T-55 tanks was part of the 2 Independent Armoured Brigade under 39 Infantry Division. It took part in operations initially in Samba and then in Shakargarh sector and was awarded the battle honour Harar Kalan.

The regiment won the following gallantry awards-

- Vir Chakra : Captain Vikram Deuskar.
- Sena Medal : Dafadar Rup Singh, Lance Dafadar Gurdial Singh, Sowar Nathu Lal
- Mentioned in dispatches : 2nd Lieutenant Virender Kumar Jetley, 2nd Lieutenant A Khullar, 2nd Lieutenant Bhupinder Singh Mandare, Risaldar Bhan Singh

In 1979, the regiment converted to the T-72 tanks. In 2003, a special service was held at the St. James' Church, Delhi, which was built by James Skinner, to commemorate the bicentenary of the regiment.

== Uniforms ==
The old 1st Lancers wore yellow uniforms (uniquely in the British Empire) and the old 3rd wore dark blue. The "yellow" was actually close to mustard in shade and led to the regiment being nicknamed "Canaries" or "Yellow Boys" from its formation. Each regiment had the full-dress (mounted) long 'Kurta' worn with a turban and cummerbund for all ranks, also a full-dress (dismounted) or levee, dress for British officers only. These were not in general use after 1914 but could still be worn by officers on special assignments (e.g. as an aide-de-camp) or while attending court functions. The merged Skinner's Horse was assigned a dark blue full dress with yellow facings in 1922 but by 1931 the historic yellow and black had been restored. The yellow mess jacket and black waistcoat of the old 1st Bengal Lancers was adopted by the 1922 regiment of Skinner's Horse and was the cold weather mess dress until 1939. All six of these various uniforms are in the collection of the National Army Museum.

The cap badge of the regiment prior to independence consisted of a central rose over crossed lances, with a crown between the lance-heads. A scroll below bears the inscription, 'Himmat-I-Mardan Madad-I-Khuda'. The present cap badge replaced the crown by a horse mounted by a cavalryman.

== Battle and Theatre Honours ==
Bhurtpore, Ghuznee 1839, Khelat, Afghanistan 1839, Candhahar 1842, Maharajpore, Moodkee, Ferozeshah, Aliwal, Kandahar 1880, Afghanistan 1879–1880, Punjab Frontier, Pekin 1900, France and Flanders 1914–16, North West Frontier India 1915, Baluchistan 1918, Afghanistan 1919, Agordat, Keren, Amba Alagai, Abyssinia 1940–41, Senio Floodbank, Italy 1943–46, Harar Kalan, Punjab 1971.

The regiment was awarded with the 'Guidon' on 31 March 1971 at Babina by the then President V. V. Giri.

== Notable personnel ==
- General Sir Crawford Trotter Chamberlain GCIE, CSI
- General Sir William Orfeur Cavenagh KCSI
- Lieutenant General GS Grewal PVSM : General Officer Commanding-in-Chief, Western Command
- Lieutenant General Rakesh Kumar Loomba PVSM, AVSM : General Officer-Commanding III Corps, Director General of Military Intelligence
- Lieutenant General Praveen Bakshi PVSM, AVSM, VSM, ADC : 25th General Officer-Commanding-in-Chief Eastern Command
- Lieutenant General Rajni Kant Jagga PVSM, AVSM, VSM, ADC : General Officer-Commanding XII Corps, Director General of Mechanised Forces
- Lieutenant General PS Mehta AVSM, VSM : General Officer-Commanding XXI Corps

== Affiliate regiments ==
- United Kingdom – Light Dragoons The affiliation of the regiment with Light Dragoons dates back to 1842, when the two regiments fought in the Afghan war together.

== Deployments ==
=== 1st Lancers ===
- Peshawar (?? - 9 March 1889)
- Sagar (9 March 1889 - 17 December 1894)
- Meerut (17 December 1894 - 5 March 1898)
- Lucknow (5 March 1898 - ??)
- China (?? - June 1901)
- Lucknow (June 1901 - 19 March 1903)
- Jhansi (19 March 1903 - 11 February 1908)
- Lucknow (11 February 1908 - 4 January 1909)
- Dera Ismail Khan (4 January 1909 - 28 March 1912)
- Peshawar (28 March 1912 - ??)
- Delhi (31 October 1919 - 5 February 1920)
- Lucknow (5 February 1920 - ??)
- Sialkot

=== 3rd Skinner's Horse ===
- Loralai (?? - 28 April 1888)
- Kanpur (28 April 1888 - 5 February 1892)
- Faizabad (5 February 1892 - ??)
- Kohat (?? - 26 February 1899)
- Meerut (26 February 1899 - 26 December 1904)
- Neemuch (25 December 1904 - 23 November 1910)
- Meerut (23 November 1910 - ??)
- Quetta
- Sibi
- Sialkot (until amalgamation)

=== Post Amalgamation ===
- Sialkot (amalgamation - ??)
- Ferozepur

== Commandant ==
=== 1st Lancers ===
- Colonel R. Morris (10 September 1887 - 10 September 1894)
- Major R. F. Gartside-Tipping (10 September 1894 - 10 September 1901)
- Lieutenant-Colonel C. H. Hayes (10 September 1901 - 1 April 1907)
- Lieutenant-Colonel C. Davis (1 April 1907 - 1 April 1912)
- Lieutenant-Colonel C. Bailey (1 April 1912 - 5 December 1914)
- Lieutenant-Colonel P. Holland-Pryor (5 December 1914 - 7 July 1916)
- Lieutenant-Colonel F. D. Russell (7 July 1916 - ??)
- Lieutenant-Colonel L. E. Dening (1 December 1920 - ??)

=== 3rd Skinner's Horse ===
- Colonel G. W. Willock (17 January 1887 - 24 March 1892)
- Colonel E. A. Money (24 March 1892 - 16 August 1895)
- Lieutenant-Colonel G. H. Elliott (16 August 1895 - 30 September 1899)
- Major H. J. J. Middleton (30 September 1899 - 1 May 1905)
- Lieutenant-Colonel A. N. Carr (1 May 1905 - 1 October 1908)
- Lieutenant-Colonel W. E. A. Blakeney (1 October 1908 - 1 October 1913)
- Lieutenant-Colonel E. W. Wall (1 October 1913 - 1 October 1918)
- Lieutenant-Colonel J. R. Gaussen (1 October 1918 - 29 May 1920)
- Lieutenant-Colonel E. C. W. Conway-Gordon (29 May 1920 - amalgamation)

=== Post Amalgamation ===
- Lieutenant-Colonel E. C. W. Conway-Gordon (amalgamation - ??)

== Honorary Colonel ==
=== 1st Skinner's Horse ===
- George V (4 October 1899 - ??)
