= Regiment of Artillery =

Regiment of Artillery may refer to:

- Regiment of Artillery (Bangladesh)
- Regiment of Artillery (Pakistan)
- Regiment of Artillery (India)
- Regiment of Artillery of the Nation former regiment in Argentina
