= Deputy Chief of the Army Staff (India) =

Senior role in the Indian Army

- Flag of a Principal Staff Officer
- Indian Army
- Type: Principal Staff Officer
- Abbreviation: DCOAS
- Reports to: Vice Chief of the Army Staff
- Seat: Army Headquarters, New Delhi
- Formation: 27 January 1959
- First holder: Mohinder Singh Wadalia

The Deputy Chiefs of the Army Staff (DCOAS) are Principal Staff Officers (PSOs) of the Indian Army, and are three-star rank appointments held by Lieutenant Generals. Currently the rank of DCOAS has three divisions:- Capability Development and Sustenance, Information Systems & Training and Strategy.

== History ==
The position of Deputy Chief of Army Staff (DCOAS) was first established on 27 January 1959 as the second-in-command of the Indian Army after the Chief of Army Staff. It was equivalent to an Army Commander (GOC-in-C). Lieutenant General Mohinder Singh Wadalia became the first DCOAS.

In January 1965, the position of Vice Chief of the Army Staff replaced the DCOAS in the role of second-in-command, with the DCOAS becoming a Principal Staff Officer (PSO) position, replacing the former position of Chief of the General Staff.

The office of DCOAS was eventually bifurcated into :- Planning and Systems and Training and Coordination. The division of Training and Coordination was later renamed to Information Systems and Training.

In April 2021, the appointment of Deputy Chief (Planning and Systems) was amended to Deputy Chief (Capability Development and Sustenance) and Deputy Chief (Information Systems and Training) to Deputy Chief (Information Systems and Coordination). A third post and new post of DCOAS Strategy was created.

In 2025, the appointment of Deputy Chief (Information Systems and Coordination) was amended to Deputy Chief (Information Systems and Training)

== Order of Precedence ==
The DCOAS rank at No. 24 on the Indian order of precedence, along with Vice-Admirals of the Indian Navy and Air Marshals of the Indian Air Force. Since they should not draw equivalent or more salary than the next higher level, the remuneration is capped at ₹2,24,000.

== Current organisation ==
Currently, there are three DCOAS at Army HQ:

- Deputy Chief of Army Staff (Capability Development and Sustenance)
- Deputy Chief of the Army Staff (Information Systems and Training)
- Deputy Chief of Army Staff (Strategy)

== Appointees ==
=== Deputy Chief of the Army Staff (1959-65) ===
No.	Rank	Name	Decorations	Appointment date	Left office	Regiment of Commission	References
1	Lieutenant General	Mohinder Singh Wadalia		27 January 1959	15 November 1964	Kumaon Regiment	
2	Lieutenant General	Paramasiva Prabhakar Kumaramangalam	DSO, MBE	16 November 1964	15 January 1965	Regiment of Artillery	

=== Deputy Chief of the Army Staff (1965-1993) ===
No.	Rank	Name	Decorations	Appointment date	Left office	Regiment of Commission	References
3	Lieutenant General	Moti Sagar	PVSM	15 January 1965	8 May 1965	4th Gorkha Rifles	
4	Lieutenant General	Kunhiraman Palat Candeth	PVSM	1 October 1965	6 June 1966	Regiment of Artillery	
5	Lieutenant General	Jagjit Singh Aurora	PVSM	6 June 1966	27 April 1967	2nd Punjab Regiment	
6	Lieutenant General	Gopal Gurunath Bewoor	PVSM, PB	27 April 1967	4 July 1969	10th Baluch Regiment	
7	Lieutenant General	Reginald Stephen Noronha	PVSM, MC	4 July 1969	5 September 1973	Madras Regiment	
8	Lieutenant General	S. L. Menezes	PVSM, SC	5 September 1973	20 March 1978	The Grenadiers	
9	Lieutenant General	K. V. Krishna Rao	PVSM	20 March 1978	25 May 1979	Mahar Regiment	
10	Lieutenant General	H. C. Dutta	PVSM	25 May 1979	23 August 1981	8th Gorkha Rifles	
11	Lieutenant General	Krishnaswamy Sundarji	PVSM	23 August 1981	1 January 1983	Mahar Regiment	
12	Lieutenant General	Hriday Kaul	PVSM, AVSM	16 January 1983	February 1985	2nd Lancers (Gardner's Horse)	
13	Lieutenant General	C.N. Somanna	PVSM	February 1985	1 September 1986	Brigade of the Guards	
14	Lieutenant General	Anand Sarup	PVSM, MVC	8 September 1986	31 March 1987	8th Gorkha Rifles	
15	Lieutenant General	Kunwar Mahendra Singh	PVSM	5 April 1987	30 November 1987	Garhwal Rifles	
16	Lieutenant General	Lakshman Singh Rawat	AVSM	30 November 1987	30 November 1988	11th Gorkha Rifles	
17	Lieutenant General	R.N. Mahajan	PVSM, VSM	December 1988	1 August 1991	Kumaon Regiment	
18	Lieutenant General	R. Sharma	AVSM	22 August 1991	September 1993	2nd Lancers (Gardner's Horse)	

== Deputy Chief of Army Staff (Capability Development and Sustenance) ==
This officer takes care of all capital procurement. DG Infantry, DG Armoured, ADG Mechanised Infantry, DG Artillery, DG Air Defence and DG Capability Development report come under this office.

=== Deputy Chief of the Army Staff (Planning and Systems) ===
Rank	Name	Decorations	Appointment date	Left office	Regiment of Commission	References
Lieutenant General	Sushil Kumar Pillai	PVSM	May 1988		Assam Regiment	
Lieutenant General	Prakash Mani Tripathi	PVSM, AVSM	1992	September 1993	63rd Cavalry	
Lieutenant General	D.K. Khanna		September 1993	31 August 1994	Kumaon Regiment	
Lieutenant General	S.S. Sethi	AVSM	1 September 1994	September 1996	Regiment of Artillery	
Lieutenant General	N.S. Malik	PVSM	September 1996	28 February 1998	4th Horse (Hodson's Horse)	
Lieutenant General	Shamsher Singh Mehta	PVSM, AVSM**, VSM	March 1998	31 March 2001	63rd Cavalry	
Lieutenant General	Arjun Singh Khanna	PVSM, AVSM, VrC	1 April 2001	31 August 2002	Regiment of Artillery	
Lieutenant General	Ashok Chaki	PVSM, AVSM, SM, VSM	1 September 2002	1 January 2004	4th Gorkha Rifles	
Lieutenant General	P.P.S. Bhandari	PVSM, AVSM	1 January 2004	31 January 2006	4th Horse (Hodson's Horse)	
Lieutenant General	Gurditar Singh	PVSM, AVSM	1 February 2006		Armoured Corps	
Lieutenant General	Zameer Uddin Shah	PVSM, SM, VSM	1 October 2006	31 August 2008	Regiment of Artillery	
Lieutenant General	Manbir Singh Dadwal	PVSM, AVSM**, VSM	August 2008		Dogra Regiment	
Lieutenant General	J.P. Singh	PVSM, AVSM	March 2010	September 2011	Armoured Corps	
Lieutenant General	Narendra Singh	PVSM, AVSM	September 2011	2013	Maratha Light Infantry	
Lieutenant General	C.A. Krishnan	PVSM, UYSM, AVSM	2014	2015	4th Gorkha Rifles	
Lieutenant General	Subrata Saha	PVSM, UYSM, YSM, VSM*		31 March 2017	Assam Regiment	
Lieutenant General	Shravan Kumar Patyal	PVSM, UYSM, SM	31 March 2017	May 2018	4th Gorkha Rifles	
Lieutenant General	Sudarshan Srikant Hasabnis	PVSM, VSM	June 2018	December 2020	Corps of Engineers	

=== Deputy Chief of Army Staff (Capability Development and Sustenance) ===
Rank	Name	Photo	Decorations	Appointment date	Left office	Regiment of Commission	References
Lieutenant General	Shantanu Dayal		UYSM, AVSM, SM, VSM	1 January 2021	31 October 2022	Garhwal Rifles	
Lieutenant General	JB Chaudhari		PVSM, SM, VSM	1 November 2022	31 October 2024	Brigade of the Guards	
Lieutenant General	Rahul R Singh		AVSM, VSM	1 November 2024	30 September 2026	Regiment of Artillery	
Lieutenant General	Shamsher Singh Virk		AVSM, SM	1 October 2026	Incumbent	Garhwal Rifles	

== Deputy Chief of Army Staff (Information Systems and Training) ==
The DG Signals, DG Information Systems, DG Integrated Training and DG Staff Duty report to this office.

=== Deputy Chief of the Army Staff (Training and Coordination) ===
Rank	Name	Decorations	Appointment date	Left office	Regiment of Commission	References
Lieutenant General	Satish Nambiar	PVSM, AVSM, VrC	1993	31 August 1994	Maratha Light Infantry	
Lieutenant General	K.L. D'Souza	PVSM, AVSM	1 September 1994		Regiment of Artillery	
Lieutenant General	M.R. Sharma	PVSM, VSM	1998	1999	Dogra Regiment	
Lieutenant General	Surinder Kumar Jetley	PVSM, AVSM, SM	February 1999	May 2000	Central India Horse	
Lieutenant General	R.K. Sawhney	PVSM, AVSM	June 2000		Jammu and Kashmir Rifles	
Lieutenant General	R.S. Kadyan	PVSM, AVSM, VSM	2002		Rajputana Rifles	
Lieutenant General	J.B.S. Yadava	PVSM, AVSM, VrC, VSM	1 September 2002	28 February 2005	11th Gorkha Rifles	

=== Deputy Chief of the Army Staff (Information Systems and Training) ===
Rank	Name	Decorations	Appointment date	Left office	Regiment of Commission	References
Lieutenant General	Mohinder Puri	PVSM, UYSM	28 February 2005	30 April 2006	3rd Gorkha Rifles	
Lieutenant General	Susheel Gupta	AVSM, YSM	1 May 2006		Jammu and Kashmir Rifles	
Lieutenant General	Samer Pal Singh Dhillon	PVSM, AVSM, VSM	2008	2009	Regiment of Artillery	
Lieutenant General	Virender Singh Tonk	PVSM, AVSM	2010		Rajput Regiment	
Lieutenant General	Ramesh Halagali	PVSM, AVSM, SM	February 2012	January 2013	Sikh Light Infantry	
Lieutenant General	DS Thakur		January 2013		Maratha Light Infantry	
Lieutenant General	Jai Prakash Nehra	PVSM, AVSM**		October 2014	Madras Regiment	
Lieutenant General	Gurmit Singh	PVSM, UYSM, AVSM, VSM	October 2014	January 2016	Assam Regiment	
Lieutenant General	Jagbir Singh Cheema	PVSM, AVSM, VSM	1 February 2017	November 2017	Sikh Regiment	
Lieutenant General	N.P.S. Hira	PVSM, AVSM, SM	14 March 2016	Jan 2017	Sikh Light Infantry	
Lieutenant General	Ranbir Singh	PVSM, AVSM**, YSM, SM	Dec 2017	June 2018	Dogra Regiment	
Lieutenant General	Iqroop Singh Ghuman	PVSM, AVSM	July 2018	30 September 2019	Brigade of the Guards	
Lieutenant General	Saranjit Singh	PVSM, UYSM, YSM	1 October 2019	31 August 2020	Sikh Light Infantry	

=== Deputy Chief of the Army Staff (Information Systems and Coordination) ===
Rank	Name	Decorations	Appointment date	Left office	Regiment of Commission	References
Lieutenant General	Amardeep Singh Bhinder	AVSM, VSM	1 September 2020	31 March 2021	9th Deccan Horse	
Lieutenant General	Upendra Dwivedi	AVSM	10 April 2021	31 January 2022	Jammu and Kashmir Rifles	
Lieutenant General	C.B. Ponnappa	AVSM, VSM	16 February 2022	31 March 2022	Mahar Regiment	
Lieutenant General	Ravin Khosla	UYSM, AVSM, SM, VSM	5 April 2022	31 March 2023	5th Gorkha Rifles (Frontier Force)	
Lieutenant General	Rakesh Kapoor	AVSM, VSM	9 June 2023	30 November 2025	63rd Cavalry	

=== Deputy Chief of the Army Staff (Information Systems and Training) ===
Rank	Name	Photo	Decorations	Appointment date	Left office	Regiment of Commission	References
Lieutenant General	Rakesh Kapoor		AVSM, VSM	9 June 2023	30 November 2025	63rd Cavalry	
Lieutenant General	Vipul Shinghal		AVSM, SM	1 December 2025	Incumbent	51 Armoured Regiment	

== Deputy Chief of Army Staff (Strategy) ==
The Director General of Military Operations (DGMO), Director General Military Intelligence (DGMI), DG Operation Logistics and DG Information Warfare report to this office.

Rank	Name	Photo	Decorations	Appointment date	Left office	Regiment of Commission	References
Lieutenant General	Paramjit Singh Sangha (Note: Lt. Gen. Sangha was commissioned into the Indian Army on 12 June 1982 in Madras Regiment. He later on shifted to the Parachute Regiment (Special Forces) in January 1984.)		UYSM, AVSM, SM	February 2021	30 June 2021	Parachute Regiment	
Lieutenant General	Sanjeev Kumar Sharma	Lieutenant General Sanjeev Kumar Sharma	AVSM, YSM	1 July 2021	30 June 2022	Rajputana Rifles	
Lieutenant General	M. V. Suchindra Kumar	Lieutenant General M. V. Suchindra Kumar, PVSM, AVSM, YSM & bar, VSM	AVSM, YSM**, VSM	1 July 2022	28 February 2023	Assam Regiment	
Lieutenant General	Tarun Kumar Aich	Deputy Chief of Army Staff (Strategy) Lt Gen Tarun Kumar Aich PVSM, AVSM	PVSM, AVSM	15 March 2023	31 October 2024	Madras Regiment	
Lieutenant General	Pratik Sharma		PVSM, AVSM, SM	1 November 2024	30 April 2025	Madras Regiment	
Lieutenant General	Rajiv Ghai		SYSM, UYSM, AVSM, SM***	9 June 2025	Incumbent	Kumaon Regiment	

== See also ==
- Chief of the Army Staff
- Vice Chief of the Army Staff
- Deputy Chief of the Naval Staff
- Deputy Chief of the Air Staff
