= Kamal Jit Singh =

Retired Lieutenant General, Indian Army

Lieutenant General Kamal Jit Singh PVSM, AVSM & Bar
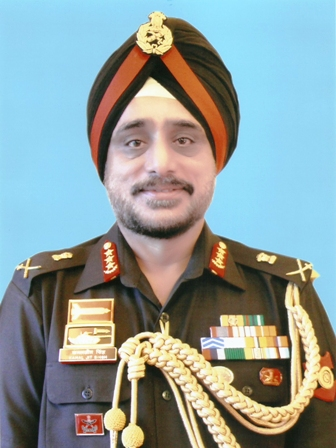
- Spouse: Anita Singh
- Military career
- Allegiance: India
- Branch: Indian Army
- Service years: 1977 – 31 July 2016
- Rank: Lieutenant General
- Service number: IC-34350Y
- Unit: 63 Cavalry
- Commands: Western Command; XXXIII Corps; 63 Cavalry; 83 Armoured Regiment
- Awards: Param Vishisht Seva Medal; Ati Vishisht Seva Medal & Bar

Lieutenant General Kamal Jit Singh, PVSM, AVSM & Bar is a retired Indian Army officer and former general officer commanding-in-chief of Western Command. After retirement, he was conferred with Maharaja Ranjit Singh Chair of Excellence in Punjab University. and was appointed as Advisor to CM Haryana in November 2018.

He graduated from the National Defence Academy, and attended various staff courses in training academies of the Indian Army throughout the country. Singh worked closely with UN Peacekeeping forces stationed in Angola and was commended by the chief and UN Force Commander during his tenure. He held several appointments as commanding officer and also staff appointments at the headquarters of the Indian Army. He has been twice awarded the Ati Vishisht Seva Medal. (Note: Bar to Ati Vishisht Seva Medal.)

In 2019, Singh was appointed as State Information Commissioner and was inducted into Chandigarh Advisory Council. He was nominated as Chairman of Education Standing Committee of UT Advisory Council in 2022. He was awarded Ph D in Defence Studies in October 2023. He was conferred with designation of Honorary Professor in PU in September 2023 and as Prof of Practice in Chandigarh University in October 2023. His first book, General's Jottings was released in Kasauli LitFest- ISBN 978-93-92210-91-4. UEM Jaipur conferred Ph D (Honoris Causa) on him on 22 February 2025. He was inducted in State Higher Education Council Chandigarh in March 2026.

== Personal life and education ==
Singh graduated from the National Defence Academy, Khadakwasla, and was awarded the bronze medal (for academics). He attended various command courses, including the National Defence Course and Higher Command Course, and was awarded the Col. Pyare Lal Medal and Commandant's Medal for his performance. He also attended the Defence Services Staff Course. (Note: Naval Staff Course-on Competitive Vacancy)

Singh completed his Master of Science and Master of Philosophy (M.Phil.) in defence studies and his Master of Philosophy in strategic studies. He also qualified for a Master of Business Administration. He was awarded Ph D in Defence Studies in Oct 2023.

Singh's wife, Anita, coordinated the winning team (Note: Budha Dal Public School team) of the Global Space Settlement Design Competition held by NASA and was awarded the Government of Punjab's Samman Patra. The couple have two sons, Sahil and Samrat, who both work in the private sector.

== Military career ==
Singh was commissioned through the Indian Military Academy into the 63 Cavalry, an armoured regiment of the Indian Army, on 11 June 1977. During his three-decade long career, he has served in several counter-insurgency areas such as Nagaland, Manipur, and Punjab and was twice commended by the Eastern army commander during his service in Nagaland and Manipur. Additionally, he worked with the paramilitary force, the Assam Rifles, and the United Nations Peacekeeping Forces stationed in Angola. He has commanded 2 armoured regiments, 63 Cavalry; 83 Armoured Regiment; an armoured brigade of T-90s; an armoured division, and a corps in the north-eastern region.

During his time with the United Nations Peacekeeping Forces (UNPKF), Singh served as chief operations officer and team commander. He was commended by the Chief of the Indian Army Staff and also received the UN Force Commander's citation for his contributions to UNPKF.

His staff appointments include brigade major of an armoured brigade, assistant military secretary (Policy), military assistant to deputy chief of army staff (COAS), colonel general staff of division involved in counter-insurgency operations, brigadier general staff of a Strike Corps, and additional director general (Perspective Planning) at the headquarters of the Indian Army. (Note: Integrated headquarters of Ministry of Defence (Army)) He served as an instructor at the School of Armoured Warfare and also on the Directing Staff at the Higher Command Wing of the Army War College, Mhow. (Note: Military headquarters of War, generally referred as Mhow.) He was succeeded by Lieutenant General Surinder Singh as the GOC-in-C Western Command.

He was awarded the Param Vishisht Seva Medal (January 2016) and the Ati Vishisht Seva Medal and Bar by the President of India.

== Honours and decorations ==

Param Vishisht Seva Medal		Ati Vishisht Seva Medal (Bar)	
Samanya Seva Medal	Special Service Medal	Operation Vijay Medal	Operation Parakram Medal
High Altitude Service Medal	Videsh Seva Medal	50th Anniversary of Independence Medal	30 Years Long Service Medal
20 Years Long Service Medal	9 Years Long Service Medal	UN Mission in Angola Medal	UN Mission in Namibia Medal

Singh was honoured by the Punjab Government on the 550th Prakash Utsav of Guru Nanak.

== Controversy ==
In May 2016, Singh was allegedly involved in a verbal spat with Lieutenant General R. Ravindran, then General Officer Commanding (GoC) Delhi Area regarding the functioning of the GoC. Subsequently, Ravindran was transferred to Lucknow. The Army HQ called it a routine transfer.

== Notes ==
Footnotes

Citations

Military offices
Preceded by Philip Campose	General Officer Commanding-in-Chief Western Command; 1 Aug 2014 – 31 Jul 2016	Succeeded by Surinder Singh
