= Vipul Shinghal =

Senior Indian Army general

Lieutenant General Vipul Shinghal AVSM SM
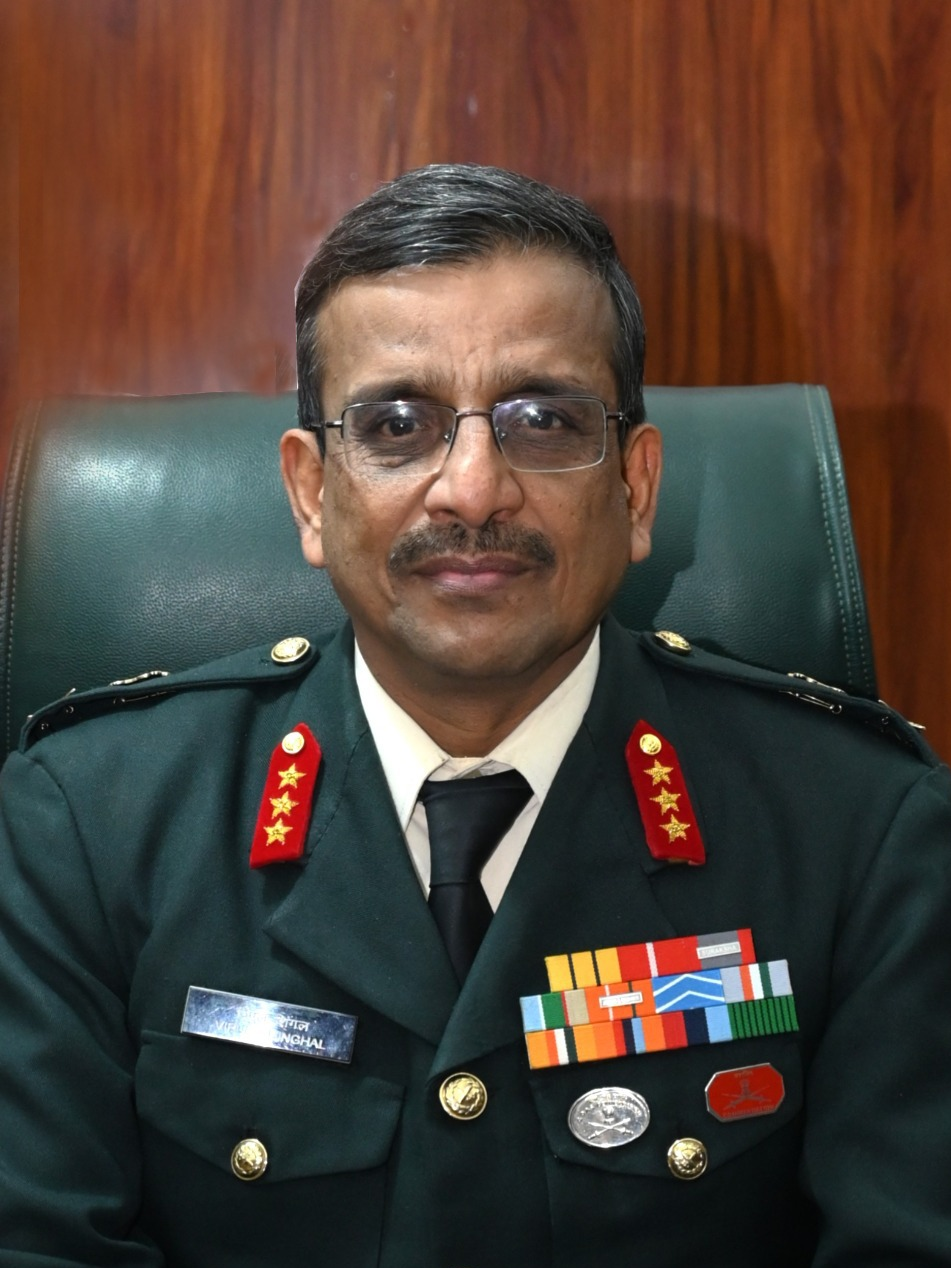
- Shinghal in 2025
- Military career
- Allegiance: India
- Branch: Indian Army
- Service years: December 1988–present
- Rank: Lieutenant General
- Service number: IC-48050H
- Unit: 51 Armoured Regiment
- Commands: XXI Corps
- Awards: Ati Vishisht Seva Medal; Sena Medal

Vipul Shinghal AVSM, SM is a Lieutenant General of the Indian Army who currently serves as the Deputy Chief of Integrated Defence Staff (Doctrine, Organisation and Training) at the HQ IDS. He earlier commanded the Sudarshan Chakra Corps, a premier Strike Corps of the Indian Army, headquartered in Bhopal.

== Early life and education ==
Shinghal is a second-generation Army officer. He studied at The Doon School, Dehradun, and later joined the National Defence Academy in Khadakwasla before being commissioned into the Armoured Corps in December 1988.

== Military career ==
Shinghal was commissioned into the 51 Armoured Regiment in December 1988 and has held a wide range of operational, instructional and staff appointments throughout his career.

He commanded an Armoured Regiment deployed on the Western Front, an Independent Armoured Brigade in the desert sector, an Armoured Division. He has held key staff appointments including Brigadier General Staff (Operations) of a Strike Corps, Major General General Staff (Operations) at a Command Headquarters, and Director in the Strategic Planning Directorate at Army Headquarters. Later he served as the General Officer Commanding of the Sudarshan Chakra Corps. He assumed command of the Corps on 3 August 2022, succeeding Lieutenant General Dhiraj Seth

During his service, he also served in the United Nations as part of peacekeeping missions in Ethiopia and Eritrea, and later at the UN Headquarters in New York. In January 2024, he was appointed as the Deputy Chief of Integrated Defence Staff (Doctrine, Organisation and Training) at HQ IDS.

== Awards and decorations ==
Over his career, Shinghal has been awarded the Ati Vishisht Seva Medal and the Sena Medal for distinguished service of an exceptional order.

Ati Vishisht Seva Medal	Sena Medal		Samanya Seva Medal
Operation Parakram Medal	Sainya Seva Medal	High Altitude Medal	75th Independence Anniversary Medal
50th Independence Anniversary Medal	30 Years Long Service Medal	20 Years Long Service Medal	9 Years Long Service Medal

Military offices
Preceded by Dhiraj Seth	General Officer Commanding XXI Corps; 2022 - 2023	Succeeded by Prit Pal Singh
Preceded by Jeetendra Mishra	Deputy Chief of Integrated Defence Staff (Doctrine, Organisation & Training); 2024 - 2025	Succeeded by Zubin A. Minwalla
Preceded by Rakesh Kapoor	Deputy Chief of the Army Staff (Information Systems and Training); 2025 - 2025	Incumbent
