= 16th Light Cavalry =

Indian Army unit

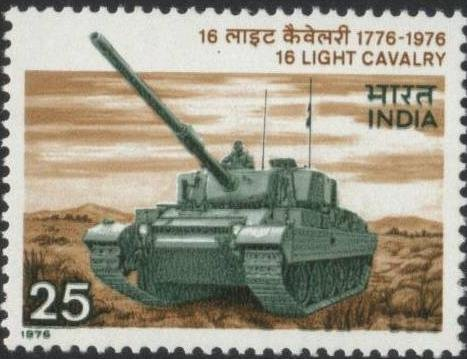
- Active: 1776 – present
- Country: India
- Allegiance: British India; India
- Branch: British Indian Army; Indian Army
- Type: Armoured
- Size: Regiment
- Equipment: T-72
- Engagements: Second Anglo-Mysore War; Third Anglo-Mysore War; Fourth Anglo-Mysore War; Third Anglo-Burmese War; Third Afghan War; World War I World War II; Indo-Pakistani War of 1965; Indo-Pakistani War of 1971
- Battle honours: Sholinghur-1781; Carnatic-1784; Mysore-1792; Seringapatam-1799; Burma-1885-1887; Afghanistan-1919; Meiktila-1945; Capture of Meiktila-1945; Defence of Meiktila-1945; Pegu-1945; Sittang-1945; Rangoon Road-1945; Burma-1945; Punjab-1965

Commanders
- Colonel of the Regiment: General Dhiraj Seth

The 16th Light Cavalry is a regiment of the Armoured Corps, a primary combat arm of the Indian Army. Prior to India gaining independence from the British in 1947, it was a regular cavalry regiment of the British Indian Army. It was formed in 1776 and is the oldest armoured regiment raised in India. The 16th Light Cavalry saw service in a number of conflicts ranging from the Second Anglo-Mysore War in 1781 to World War II. It has a number of battle honours including "Punjab 1965" earned during the Indo-Pakistani War of 1965.

== History ==
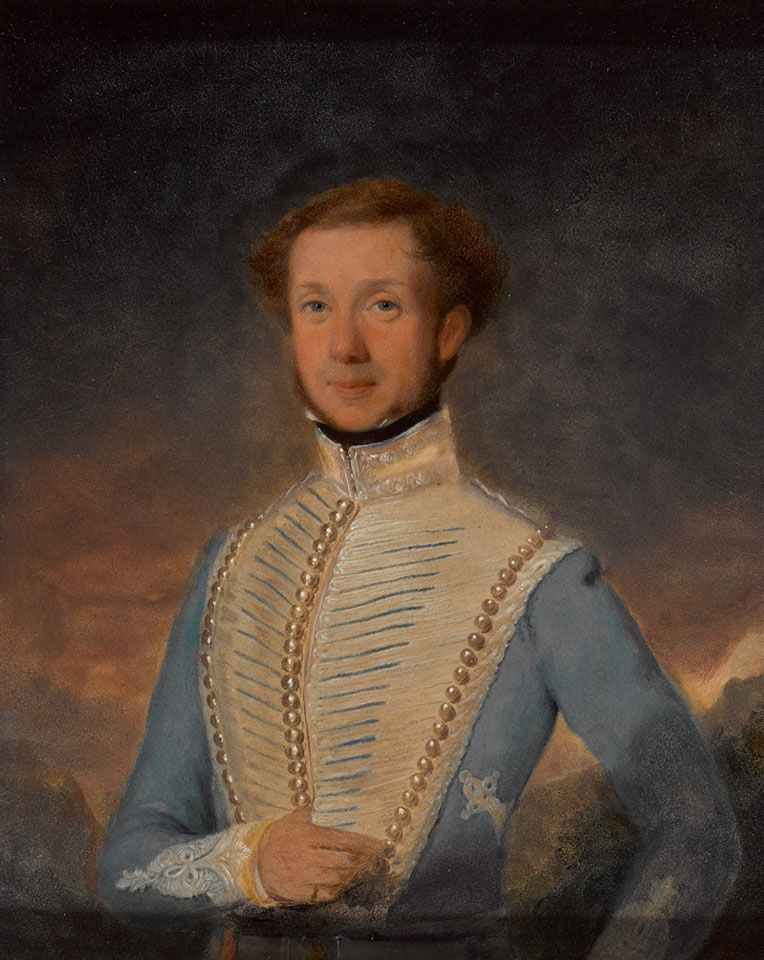
c. 1832 portrait of a 2nd Madras Light Cavalry lieutenant

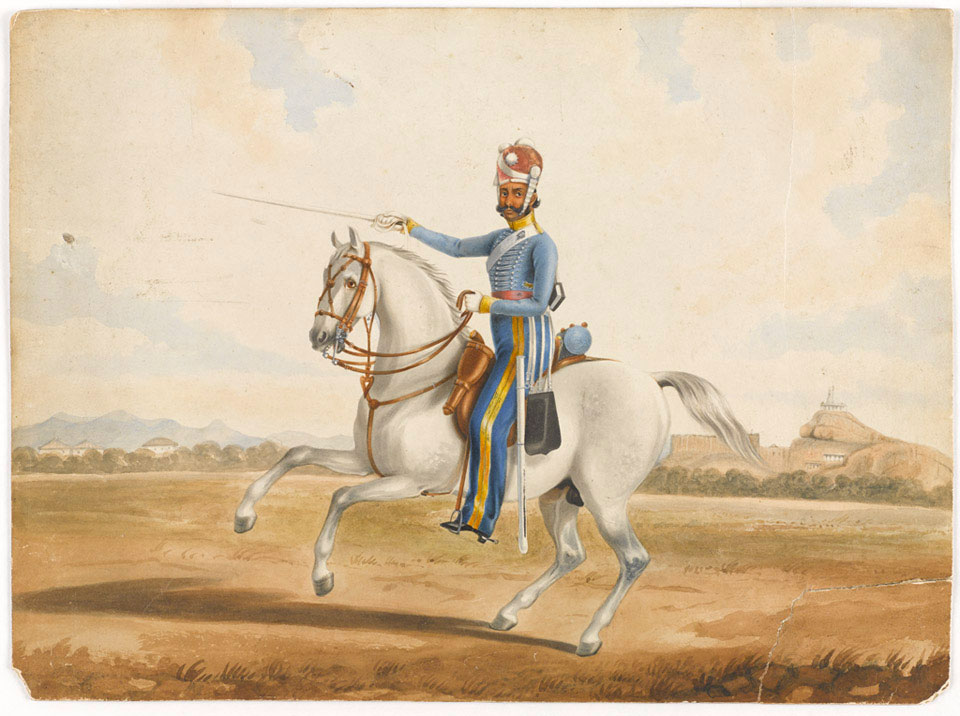
c. 1847 painting of a Madras Light Cavalry sowar

=== Formation ===
The regiment was raised prior to 1776 as the 3rd Regiment of Native Cavalry in the service of the Nawab of Arcot, Muhammad Ali Khan Wallajah. In 1780, while under service with the British East India Company, it formed part of the force that defeated Hyder Ali during the Second Anglo-Mysore War and was awarded battle honours for the Battle of Sholinghur, Battle of Mysore, Battle of Carnatic and the Battle of Seringapatam for service during the Anglo-Mysore Wars. After the Anglo-Mysore Wars the regiment was next in action during the Third Anglo-Burmese War and were awarded the Battle Honour of Burma 1885-87.

=== Early 20th Century ===
During World War I (1914–1918) the regiment remained in India for the defence of the North West Frontier but they did send drafts to other Indian cavalry regiments serving in France and the Middle East. In 1919 the regiment was involved in the brief Third Afghan War, for which they were awarded the battle honour of Afghanistan 1919. In 1923, the regiment was selected for ‘Indianisation’, wherein British officers were finally replaced by Indian officers and this became one of the first Indian cavalry regiment to be officered by Indians.

=== World War II ===
In September 1939, when World War II broke out, the regiment was still mounted on horses. The process of mechanisation (converting from horses to armoured vehicles) began in Peshawar in October 1940 when the last mounted parade was held and the process completed in Quetta in 1941. From 1941 to 1945 the regiment was retained in India.

In 1945, they were selected to undertake operations in Burma. Within three weeks, the regiment covered a distance of 3,500 miles from Quetta to the banks of Irrawaddy River and was personally complimented by General Slim, the Fourteenth Army commander.

In Burma the regiment were controlled directly by the 14th Army and were also attached to the 255th Indian Tank Brigade, the brigade formation was;

- 116 Royal Armoured Corps (formed from the Gordon Highlanders) - Sherman tanks.
- 7th Light Cavalry - Stuart
- 16th Light Cavalry - Humber and Daimler armoured cars (B squadron).

In 1947, it was one of the regiments retained by India upon partition.

== Post Independence ==
During the Indo-Pakistani War of 1965, the regiment was part of the 1 Armoured Brigade and took part in the Battle of Phillora and Battle of Gadgor. In a major tank battle fought at Gadgor on 8 September, and a subsequent engagement at Alhar Railway Station, they destroyed 16 Patton Tanks of the enemy, against a loss of 6 tanks of their own. 2 officers, 1 JCO and 14 other ranks of the unit were killed in these actions and many wounded. The regiment won the Theatre Honour 'PUNJAB 1965'. The gallantry awards won by its officers and men comprised 1 Vir Chakra, 1 Sena Medal, 8 Mention-in-Dispatches and 3 Commendation Cards from the Chief of Army Staff.

In the Indo-Pakistani War of 1971, the regiment with its Centurion tanks fought the war under the 16th Independent Armoured Brigade in Shakargarh Sector.

Seven Vijayanta tanks from 16 Cavalry fought in Amritsar during Operation Blue Star. At least three entered the Golden Temple compound to provide illumination and machine gun fire, but eventually deployed their main guns against the fortified Akal Takht building.

During a terrorist attack in Samba on 26 September 2013, three terrorist attacked the officers' mess of the regiment. The three terrorists were killed, but the unit lost one officer and three men. Lt Col Bikramjeet Singh was conferred with Shaurya Chakra posthumously.

== Affiliations ==
The regiment was affiliated with the Madras Regiment in 2003 and with INS Talwar, the lead ship of the modern Talwar (modified Krivak) class frigates in 2005.

== Composition ==
During its more than 200 years of existence, the regiment has seen many changes of organisations and designations. Manned originally by men from the Madras Presidency, its composition was changed in 1903 to Rajputs, Jats and Deccani Muslims. Since Independence, the regiment has retained its original South Indian composition.

== Lineage ==
- 1776 – Regiment of Cavalry (Stevenson's), Nawab of Arcot's Army
- 1784 – 3rd Madras Native Cavalry
- 1784 – 1st Madras Native Cavalry
- 1786 – 4th Madras Native Cavalry
- 1788 – 2nd Madras Native Cavalry
- 1819 – 2nd Madras Light Cavalry
- 1886 – 2nd Regiment of Madras Lancers
- 1901 – 2nd Madras Lancers
- 1903 – 27th Light Cavalry
- 1922 – 16th Light Cavalry
- 1947 – Allocated to India at independence and partition, continues in service as 16th Light Cavalry

== Battle honours ==
The battle and theatre honours of the 16th Light Cavalry are:

Pre-World War I

- Sholinghur
- Carnatic
- Mysore
- Seringapatam
- Burma 1885-87

World War I and later

- Afghanistan 1919

The Second World War

- Meiktila
- Capture of Meiktila
- Defence of Meiktila
- Rangoon Road
- Pegu 1945
- Sittang 1945
- Burma 1942-45.

Indo Pak Conflict 1965

- Punjab 1965

== Notable Officers ==
- Major General Thakur Sheodatt Singh
- Major General Hira Lal Atal - became the first Adjutant-General of independent India
- Major General Enaith Habibullah - First Commandant of the National Defence Academy, Khadakwasla
- Major General Ghanshyam Singh
- Lieutenant General Shiv Dev Verma - First Commandant of Defence Services Staff College, GOC 15 Corps
- Lieutenant General Mohinder Singh Wadalia - the first Deputy Chief of the Army Staff
- Lieutenant General Har Prasad PVSM - Commissioned into the 3rd Cavalry Regiment, commanded the regiment between 1949 and 1952, went on to become Adjutant-General and subsequently Vice Chief of the Army Staff
- General Jayanto Nath Chaudhuri OBE - 5th Chief of the Army Staff, commanded the unit from September 1944
- Lieutenant General Khem Karan Singh MVC - General Officer Commanding-in-Chief Central Command
- General Vishwa Nath Sharma PVSM, AVSM, ADC - 14th Chief of the army Staff
- Lieutenant General Arun Kumar Gautama PVSM, ADC - Commissioned into the regiment in June 1958, briefly commanded the regiment from May 1974 to October 1974. Later took over command of 81 Armoured Regiment. Commanded 34 Armoured Brigade, 29 Infantry Division and 33 Corps. GOC-in-C Central Command from April 1994 to April 1995 and GOC-in-C Western Command from April 1995 till October 1996.
