= Munindra Nath Rai =

Indian Army Officer, recipient of Yudh Seva Medal and Shaurya Chakra

Colonel Munindra Nath Rai YSM SC
- Born: 26 November 1965; Kalimpong, Westbengal
- Died: 27 January 2015 (aged 49); Jammu Kashmir
- Military career
- Allegiance: India
- Branch: Indian Army
- Service years: 1997-2015
- Rank: Colonel
- Service number: IC55822X
- Unit: 9 Gorkha Regiment
- Commands: 42 Rashtriya Rifles; 9 Gorkha Regiment
- Conflicts: Insurgency in Jammu and Kashmir †
- Awards: Shaurya Chakra(Posthumus); Yudh Seva Medal

Colonel Munindra Nath Rai YSM, SC was an officer of the Indian Army who was a recipient of the Yudh Seva Medal. Rai died in a counterintelligence operation in Jammu and Kashmir on 27 January 2015. He was posthumously awarded the Shaurya Chakra.

== Military career ==
Rai joined the Indian Army in 1997 and was commissioned in 9 Gorkha Rifles. Rai was awarded with Yudh Seva Medal on 26 January 2015, a day before his death for his actions in South Kashmir in 2014. He used to lead the operations from the front.

On 27 January 2015, his unit had received information about presence of terrorists in their operational area in Kashmir. Upon receiving the information, an immediate operation was launched by the Indian Army, Central Reserve Police Force and the Indian Police.

Reaching at the terrorist hideout, the security forces surrounded them from all sides and gave them an opportunity to surrender. However, the terrorists started firing at the security forces. During the exchange of fire, Rai was shot and was taken for medical treatment. He died later that day.

Along with Rai, head constable Sanjeev Singh also died.

== Funeral ==
Rai was cremated with full military honours. The then Army Chief, Dalbir Singh Suhag paid tribute to Rai.

Rai's daughter, Alka, shouted the war cry of the Gorkha regiments "Ayo Gorkhali" (The Gorkhas are here) at his funeral. This incident went viral on the Internet. Later this incident was depicted in the 2019 film Uri: The Surgical Strike.
