= Rakesh Kapoor (general) =

Indian Army officer

Lieutenant General Rakesh Kapoor AVSM, VSM
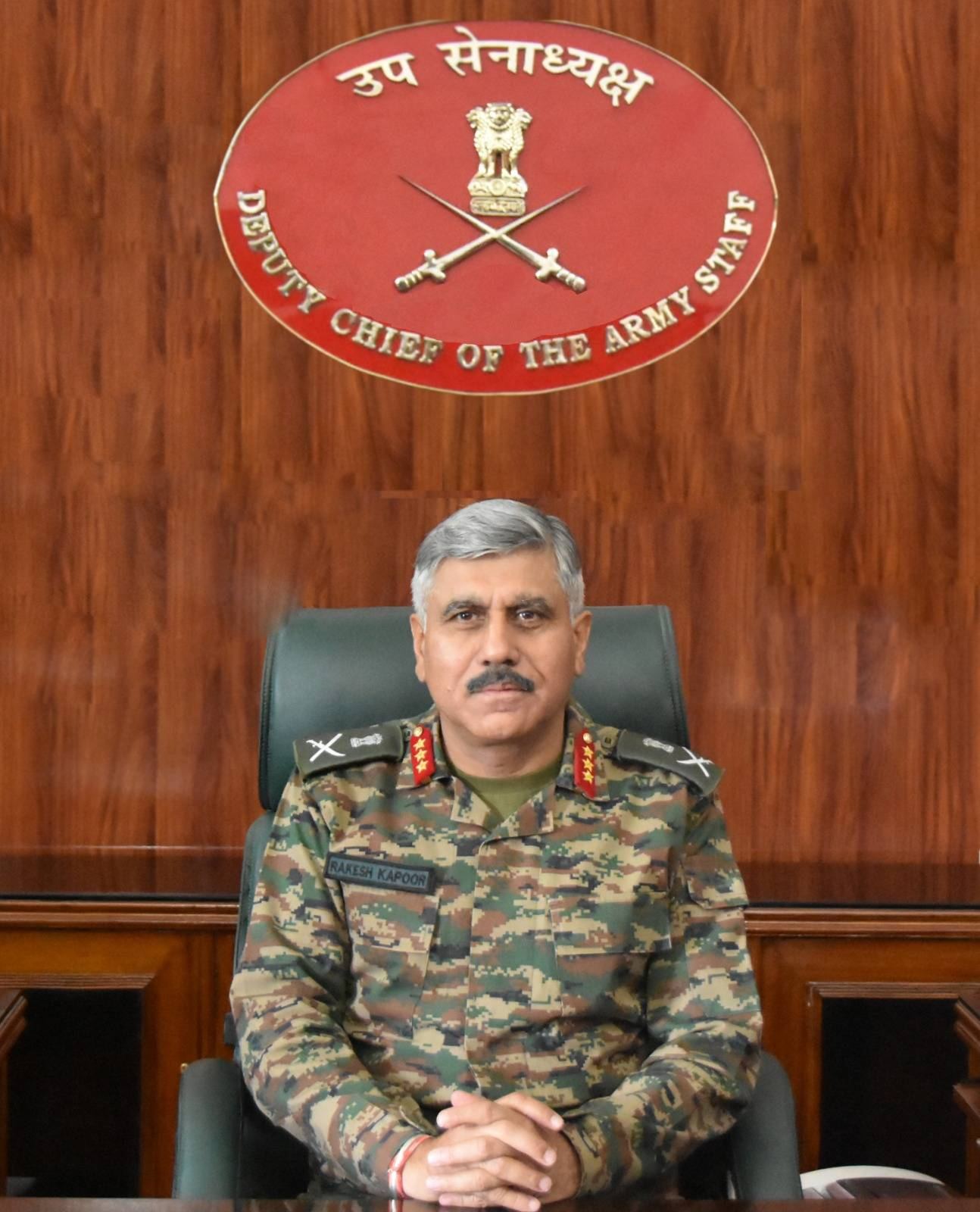
- Lt. Gen. Rakesh Kapoor as DCOAS
- Military career
- Allegiance: India
- Branch: Indian Army
- Service years: 19 December 1987 – 30 November 2025
- Rank: Lieutenant General
- Service number: IC-47076L
- Unit: 63rd Cavalry
- Commands: XII Corps
- Awards: Ati Vishisht Seva Medal; Vishisht Seva Medal

Lieutenant General Rakesh Kapoor, AVSM, VSM is a retired officer in the Indian Army. He last served as the Deputy Chief of the Army Staff (Information Systems & Training) and Colonel Commandant of the Defence Security Corps.

== Biography and early life ==
Kapoor is a distinguished graduate of St. Stephen's College, Delhi University. He is an alumnus of the Defence Services Staff College, Wellington; Higher Defence Management College, Secunderabad; and the U.S. Army War College, Pennsylvania. He holds advanced degrees including an M.Phil. in Strategy and Security Studies from the University of Madras, a Master's in Strategic Studies from the University of Pennsylvania, and a Master's in Management Studies from Osmania University.

== Military career ==
Kapoor was commissioned into the elite 63 Cavalry, an armoured regiment of the Indian Army, in December 1987. He has over 37 years of service, with experience in diverse terrains including the Rann of Kutch and super high-altitude regions of the Eastern Sector.

During his career, he has held various key command and staff appointments. He served as Advisor to the Botswana Defence Force, where he was instrumental in raising an Armoured Brigade and formulating doctrines for mechanized operations. He also represented India as part of the Shanghai Cooperation Organisation’s Military Experts Working Group.

He was promoted to Lieutenant General and took over as the General Officer Commanding of the prestigious Desert Corps on 7 March 2022, succeeding Lt Gen P S Minhas.,. He oversaw the "Suraksha Manthan 2022" on border and coastal security on 1 July 2022.

On 9 June 2023, he assumed the appointment of Deputy Chief of the Army Staff (Information Systems & Coordination), succeeding Lt Gen M V Suchindra Kumar. The position was later redesignated as Deputy Chief of the Army Staff (Information Systems & Training). He is also the Colonel Commandant of the Defence Security Corps.

== Awards and decorations ==
Kapoor's awards and decorations include:

- Ati Vishisht Seva Medal (2024)
- Vishisht Seva Medal
- Chief of Army Staff Commendation Card
- Strategic Forces Command Commendation Card
