= Zubin A. Minwalla =

Indian Army General

Lieutenant General Zubin A. Minwalla UYSM AVSM YSM
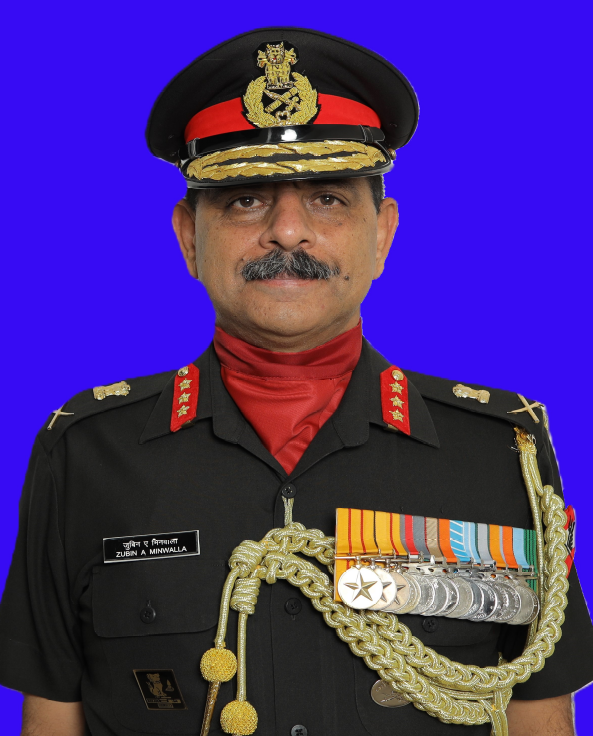

Personal details
- Spouse: Lyla Minwalla

Military service
- Allegiance: India
- Branch/service: Indian Army
- Years of service: 16 December 1989 – Present
- Rank: Lieutenant General
- Unit: 9 Gorkha Rifles
- Commands: XXXIII Corps; Uttar Bharat Area; IMTRAT; 5th Mountain Division; 268th Infantry Brigade; 4/9 Gorkha Rifles
- Service number: IC-49024N
- Awards: Uttam Yudh Seva Medal; Ati Vishisht Seva Medal; Yudh Seva Medal

Lieutenant General Zubin A. Minwalla UYSM, AVSM, YSM is a serving general officer of the Indian Army. He currently serves as the Deputy Chief of the Integrated Defence Staff (Operations). He was previously serving as the Deputy Chief of the Integrated Defence Staff (Doctrine, Organisation and Training), prior to that he served as the General Officer Commanding XXXIII Corps. He earlier served as the General Officer Commanding Uttar Bharat Area. He is also the Colonel of the Regiment of 9th Gorkha Rifles.

== Early life and education ==
He attended the Rashtriya Indian Military College, Dehradun. He is alumnus of the National Defence Academy, Khadakwasla and the Indian Military Academy, Dehradun.

== Military career ==
The general officer was commissioned into the 4th battalion of the 9th Gorkha Rifles 'CHINDITS' on 16 December 1989. Early in his career, he served as a Divisional officer at his alma-mater - the National Defence Academy. He also served as the Tactical Training Officer at NDA. He attended the Defence Services Staff College, Wellington. He served as the GSO-1 (Ops) at XI Corps headquarters.

Minwalla commanded his battalion, the 4/9 Gorkha Rifles (CHINDITS). The battalion was under the 190th Mountain Brigade and deployed on the Line of Actual Control (LAC) in Arunachal Pradesh. In the rank of Colonel, he attended the Higher Command Course (HCC)) at the Army War College, Mhow, and served as the Colonel General Staff (Planning) at Headquarters Eastern Command and Colonel General Staff (Infantry) at the Army War College, Mhow.

Promoted to the rank of Brigadier, Minwalla commanded the 268th Infantry Brigade in Pharkian, on the Line of Control. On 26 January 2017, he was awarded the Yudh Seva Medal. He was then selected to attend the National Defence College in New Delhi, as part of the 58th course. He subsequently served as the Brigadier (Administration) at NDA, as the Brigadier General Staff at HQ XII Corps and as the Brigadier (IC) at Army Headquarters.

=== General officer ===
Minwalla was promoted to the rank of Major General and appointed General officer commanding 5th Mountain Division in Sikkim. He subsequently moved to Bhutan in command of the Indian Military Training Team (IMTRAT). On 26 January 2023, he was awarded the Ati Vishisht Seva Medal.

Promoted to the rank of Lieutenant General, Minwalla moved to Army Headquarters as the Director General (Information Warfare). On 2 December 2023, he took over as the Colonel of the 9th Gorkha Rifles. Later that month, he was appointed General officer commanding Uttar Bharat Area. The UB Area is a static formation, consisting of multiple sub-areas, covering the states of Uttarakhand, Bihar, Jharkhand and parts of Uttar Pradesh. He took over from Lieutenant General Ram Chander Tiwari on 28 December 2023.

On 10 June 2024, Minwalla took command of XXXIII Corps. Christened Trishakti Corps, the corps is headquartered in Siliguri and its area of responsibility includes North Bengal, Sikkim, and if needed, Bhutan. For his command of XXXIII Corps, he was awarded the Uttam Yudh Seva Medal on 26 January 2025. After a year-long tenure, he moved to the Integrated Defence Staff headquarters as the Deputy Chief of Integrated Defence Staff (Doctrine, Organisation and Training), taking over from Lieutenant General Vipul Shinghal. After a short stint, he handed over to Vice Admiral Vineet McCarty and took over as DCIDS (Ops) in March 2026.

== Awards and decorations ==
Minwalla was awarded the Yudh Seva Medal in 2017, the Ati Vishisht Seva Medal in 2023 and the Uttam Yudh Seva Medal in 2025. He has also been awarded the COAS Commendation and the GOC-in-C Eastern Command Commendation.

| | Uttam Yudh Seva Medal | Ati Vishisht Seva Medal | |
| Yudh Seva Medal | Special Service Medal | Siachen Glacier Medal | Operation Parakram Medal |
| Sainya Seva Medal | High Altitude Medal | Videsh Seva Medal | 75th Independence Anniversary Medal |
| 50th Independence Anniversary Medal | 30 Years Long Service Medal | 20 Years Long Service Medal | 9 Years Long Service Medal |

Military offices
| Preceded by Ram Chander Tiwari | General Officer Commanding Uttar Bharat Area; 2023 - 2024 | Succeeded by D. G. Misra |
| Preceded by VPS Kaushik | General Officer Commanding XXXIII Corps; 2024 - 2025 | Succeeded by Man Raj Singh Mann |
| Preceded by Vipul Shinghal | Deputy Chief of Integrated Defence Staff (Doctrine, Organisation & Training); 2025 - 2026 | Succeeded by Vineet McCarty |
| Preceded by Rakesh Sinha | Deputy Chief of Integrated Defence Staff (Operations); 2026 - present | Incumbent |
