= Mohinder Singh Wadalia =

Indian military personnel

Lieutenant-General Mohinder Singh Wadalia
- Born: 30 November 1908
- Died: 20 May 2001 (aged 92); New Delhi, India
- Military career
- Allegiance: British India (1929–1947); India (1947–1965)
- Branch: British Indian Army; Indian Army
- Service years: 1929–1965
- Rank: Lieutenant-General
- Service number: AI-947
- Units: Hyderabad Regiment; 16th Light Cavalry
- Commands: Commandant of the Indian Military Academy
- Conflicts: World War II; Mediterranean and Middle East Theatre; Indo-Pakistan War of 1947
- Awards: Mentioned in dispatches

Lieutenant-General Mohinder Singh Wadalia (30 November 1908 – 20 May 2001) was an Indian Army general.

== Career ==
A King's Commissioned Indian Officer (KCIO), Wadalia was educated at Aitchison College and the Prince of Wales Royal Indian Military College, Dehra Dun. He subsequently attended the Royal Military Academy Sandhurst and was commissioned a second lieutenant in the British Indian Army on 31 January 1929, passing out fifth in the order of merit from 37 successful cadets. He was formally appointed to the Indian Army as an officer with the 4/19 Hyderabad Regiment (now 4 Kumaon Regiment) on 13 April 1930. On 1 March 1934, he transferred to the 16th Light Cavalry and was appointed a squadron officer. He was appointed the adjutant on 1 January 1937.

During the Second World War, Wadalia was appointed a GSO 3 in the Directorate of Military Training on 27 June 1941, under Brigadier Francis Tuker. Advanced to a GSO 2 on 26 September and promoted temporary major in December, Wadalia was transferred to the Directorate of Armoured Fighting Vehicles on 26 May 1943. He served on the headquarters staff in the Persia-Iraq theatre and was mentioned in dispatches. On 13 August 1944, he was appointed a GSO 1 on the staff, with the acting rank of lieutenant-colonel. He was promoted substantive major (temporary lieutenant-colonel) on 31 January 1946. On 23 December 1949, he was promoted temporary brigadier and given command of a brigade.

On 21 June 1951, Wadalia was appointed an area commander with the local rank of major general. On 1 September, he was appointed Commandant of the National Defence Academy with the acting rank of major-general. He was the Deputy Chief of the Army Staff between 27 January 1959 and 15 November 1964.

== Dates of rank ==
| Insignia | Rank | Component | Date of rank |
|---|---|---|---|
| | Second Lieutenant | British Indian Army | 31 January 1929 |
| | Lieutenant | British Indian Army | 30 April 1931 |
| | Captain | British Indian Army | 31 January 1938 |
| | Major | British Indian Army | 26 September 1941 (acting); 26 December 1941 (temporary); 31 January 1946 (substantive) |
| | Lieutenant-Colonel | British Indian Army | 13 August 1944 (acting); 31 January 1946 (temporary) |
| | Major | Indian Army | 15 August 1947 (Note: Upon independence in 1947, India became a Dominion within the British Commonwealth of Nations. As a result, the rank insignia of the British Army, incorporating the Tudor Crown and four-pointed Bath Star ("pip"), was retained, as George VI remained Commander-in-Chief of the Indian Armed Forces. After 26 January 1950, when India became a republic, the President of India became Commander-in-Chief, and the Ashoka Lion replaced the crown, with a five-pointed star being substituted for the "pip.") |
| | Colonel | Indian Army | |
| | Brigadier | Indian Army | 1948 (acting); 23 December 1949 (temporary) |
| | Lieutenant-Colonel | Indian Army | 26 January 1950 (recommissioning and change in insignia) |
| | Brigadier | Indian Army | 31 January 1950 (substantive) |
| | Major General | Indian Army | 21 June 1951 (local); 1 September 1951 (acting) |
| | Lieutenant-General | Indian Army | |

== Notes ==
Military offices
| Preceded by Kodandera Subayya Thimayya | Commandant of the National Defence Academy; September 1951 - January 1953 | Succeeded by Enaith Habibullah |
| Preceded by Jayanto Nath Chaudhuri | Chief of the General Staff; December 1955 - May 1957 | Succeeded by S. D. Verma |
| New title Office created | Deputy Chief of the Army Staff; January 1959 - November 1964 | Succeeded by Paramasiva Prabhakar Kumaramangalam |
