= 9th Gorkha Rifles =

Regiment of the Indian Army

- Active: 1817 – Present
- Country: British Raj (1817–1947); India (1947–present)
- Branch: British Indian Army (formerly); Indian Army
- Type: Rifles
- Role: Infantry
- Size: 5 Battalions
- Regimental Centre: 39 Gorkha Training Centre (39 GTC), Varanasi, Uttar Pradesh, India
- Nickname: The Ninth
- Mottos: Kayar Hunu Bhanda Marnu Ramro (Better to die than live like a coward)
- Colors: Red, faced yellow (until 1894); Dark Green, faced black (from 1894)
- March: War Cry: Jaya Maha Kali, Ayo Gorkhali (Hail Goddess Kali, The Gorkhas are here)
- Anniversaries: 9 November
- Decorations: 17 Vir Chakras; 13 Sena Medals; 7 Shaurya Chakras; 5 Maha Vir Chakras; 3 Victoria Crosses; 1 Ashoka Chakra
- Battle honours: Post Independence Phillora, Kumarkhali, and Dera Baba Nanak

Commanders
- Colonel of the Regiment: Lt Gen Zubin A. Minwalla

Insignia
- Regimental Insignia: A pair of crossed khukuris with the numeral 9 below
- Identification symbol
- Abbreviation: 9 GR

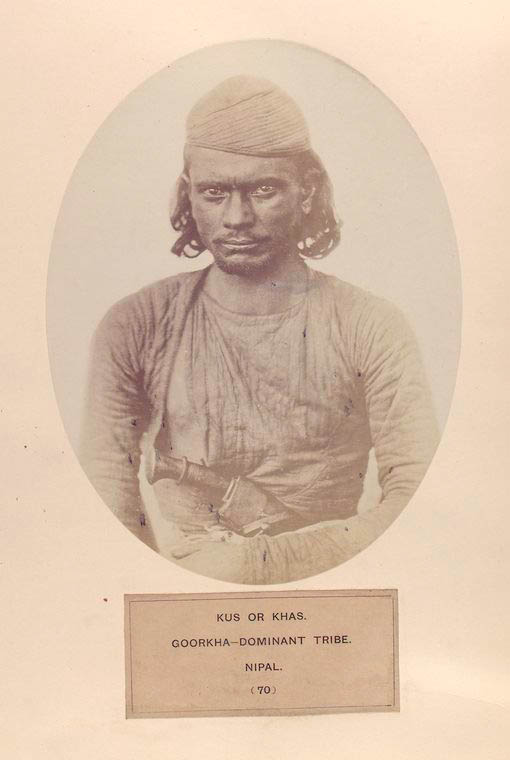
Khas man with a tucked-in khukuri, c. 1868

The 9th Gorkha Rifles is a Gorkha infantry regiment of the Indian Army, formerly part of the British Indian Army. Initially raised by the EIC in 1817, it was one of the six Gorkha regiments transferred to the Indian Army after independence under the Tripartite Agreement of 1947. The regiment primarily recruits soldiers from Nepal's dominant Khas community—Chhetri—and was originally established exclusively for Khas Arya groups. Domiciled Nepali-speaking Indians are also recruited, making up approximately 20 percent of the regiment's total strength.

== History ==
=== Pre-independence ===
The history of the 9th Gorkha Rifles dates back to 1817, when it was raised as the "Fatehgarh Levy"; this designation was changed the following year to the "Mynpoory Levy". In 1823, the unit became the 1st Battalion, 32nd Regiment of Bengal Native Infantry, although this only lasted until 1824, when it was renamed the "63rd Regiment" and was formed as a regular unit as part of the Bengal Native Infantry. After the reorganisations that took place in the aftermath of the Indian Rebellion of 1857, the regiment's designation was changed to the "9th Bengal Native Infantry" in 1861; at this time one of its companies was formed by Gorkhas and the others by hillmen. By then the regiment had fought at Bhartpur and in the difficult Battle of Sobraon in the First Anglo-Sikh War, where it had captured a Sikh standard.

By 1893, the regiment had become an entirely Gorkha unit of Khas origin, accepting only higher-caste Hindus—such as Chhetri and Thakuri (Hill kshatriya)—who were more closely aligned with Hindu traditions rather than Buddhist practice. In 1903, the regiment was officially designated as the 9th Gurkha Rifles.

9 GR fought in World War I in Europe, and in the inter war years took part in the operations on the North-West Frontier. Soldiers of the 9 GR formed part of the command of Brigadier General Reginald Dyer which fired into the crowd at the Jallianwala Bagh massacre.

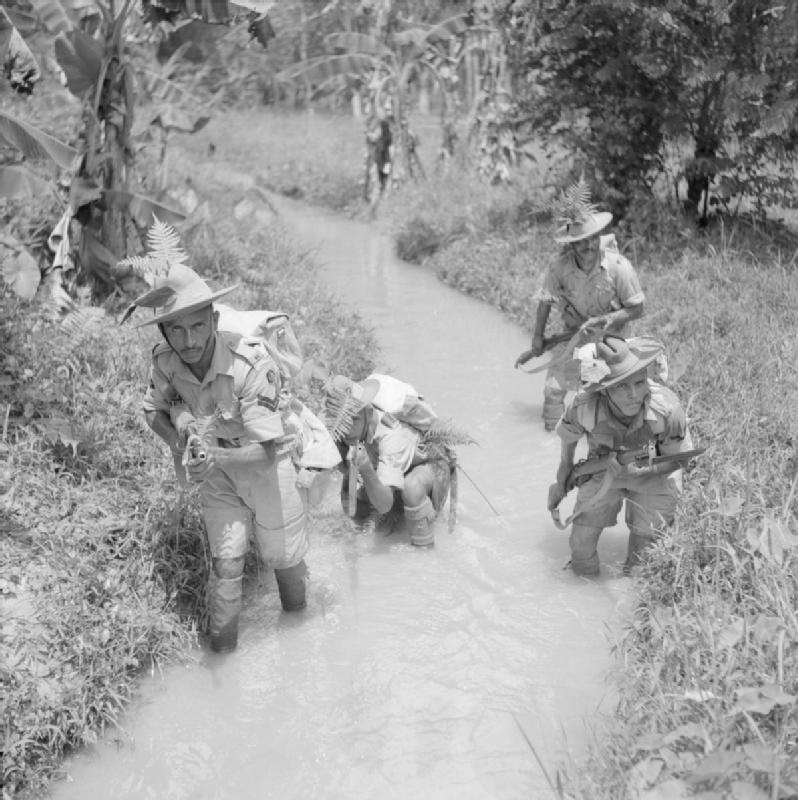
Soldiers from 2/9 GR in Malaya, October 1941

In World War II, the regiment's battalions fought in Malaya, Italy, and North Africa. The 3/9 GR and 4/9 GR formed part of the Chindit operations in Burma, and earned a reputation in the long range penetration operations.

=== Post-independence ===
India gained its independence in 1947 and 9th Gorkha Rifles was one of six Gurkha regiments (out of 10) allocated to the Indian Army as part of the Tripartite Agreement between Britain, India and Nepal. Since 1947 the regiment has fought in the 1962 Sino-Indian War, the 1/9 GR fought under the most demanding conditions on the Namka Chu in (Arunachal Pradesh).

The battalions of the regiment were involved in the 1965 and 1971 wars with Pakistan.

== Designations ==
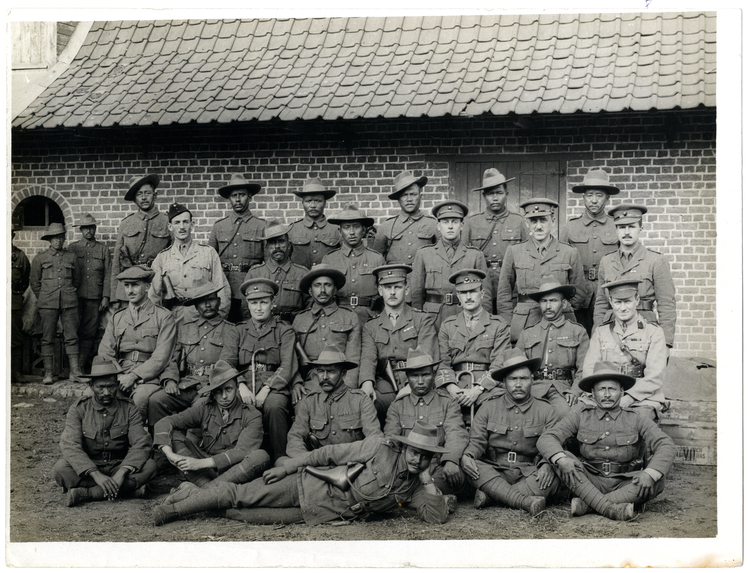
British and Indian officers 9th Gurkhas at their headquarters (Photo 24–59) in France. July 1915

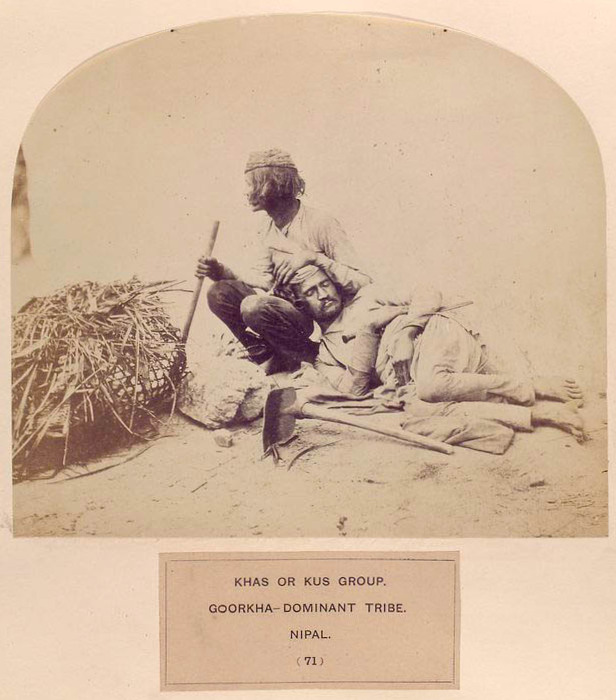
Khas men from Nepal, c. 1868

The regiment has existed since 1817 under the following designations:

- 1817–1819: Fatehgarh Levy (named after Fatehgarh town)
- 1819–1824: Mainpuri Levy (relocated to Mainpuri in 1819 and renamed the Mainpuri Levy)
- 1824–1861: 63rd Regiment of Bengal Native Infantry
- 1861–1885: 9th Regiment of Bengal Native Infantry
- 1885–1894: 9th Regiment of Bengal Infantry
- 1894–1901: 9th (Gurkha Rifle) Bengal Infantry
- 1903–1947: 9th Gurkha Rifles
- 1950–present: 9th Gorkha Rifles

== Battle honours ==
The battle honours of the 9th Gorkha rifles are:

- Pre-Independence: Bharatpur, Sobraon, Afghanistan (1879–80), Punjab Frontier,
- World War I: La Bassee, Festubert, Armentieres, Givenchy, Neuve Chapelle, Aubers, Loos, France and Flanders, Tigris, Kut-al-Amara, Mesopotamia,
- World War II: Malaya (1941–42), Djebel El Meida, Djebel Garci, Ragoubet Souissi, North Africa (1940–43), Cassino I, Hangman's Hill, Tavoleto, San Marino, Italy (1943–45), Chindits 1944, Burma (1942–45).
- Indo-Pak Conflict 1965: Phillora, Punjab 1965
- Indo-Pak Conflict 1971: Kumarkhali, East Pakistan 1971, Jammu and Kashmir 1971, Dera Baba Nanak, Punjab 1971

== Uniforms ==
As the 9th Regiment of Bengal Infantry red coats with yellow facings were worn. In 1894 the newly renamed 9th (Gurkha Rifles) Bengal Infantry were issued with what was to become the standard Gurkha parade and cold weather uniform of rifle green, with puttees, silver insignia, black metal buttons and black facings. The headdress was a round black Kilmarnock cap with a badge of crossed khukuris over the numeral 9. Pipers for the 1st Battalion wore a green plaid while the 2nd Battalion were granted the Duff clan tartan by a colonel of that name. The broad brimmed "Kashmir" slouch hat was adopted by the 9th Gurkha Rifles in July 1902. It continued in use with khaki drill service dress as general wear by all ranks in winter and summer, between the two world wars.

== Gallantry awards ==
- Victoria Cross — 3
  - Major (later Lieutenant Colonel) George Campbell Wheeler (February 23, 1917) – 2nd Battalion, 9th Gorkha Rifles.
  - Temporary [Brevet] Major Frank Blaker (July 9, 1944) – Highland Light Infantry attached to 3rd Battalion, 9th Gorkha Rifles.
  - Rifleman Sher Bahadur Thapa (September 18, 1944) – 1st Battalion, 9th Gorkha Rifles.

== Notable members ==
- John Bradburne, (1921–1979), afterwards the "Vagabond of God".
- Stafford Beer, operation research theorist who served as an officer with the regiment from 1945 to 1947.
- Colonel MN Rai, a colonel who received the Yudh Seva Medal for bravery and Shaurya Chakra posthumously.
- Bernard Dineen, (1923–2013), afterwards an award-winning journalist for The Yorkshire Post.
- Lieutenant General B. K. N. Chhibber, later governor of Punjab and administrator of Chandigarh.
- Lieutenant General Anil Kumar Bhatt, PVSM, UYSM, AVSM, SM, VSM was Director General Military Operations (DGMO) at Army Headquarters, Commander of Chinar Corps at Srinagar (J&K) and Military Secretary at Army Headquarters.
- Lt. Colonel Nasib Singh. The raising officer for 4th Battalion, 9 Gorkha Regiment.

== See also ==
=== Indian Army (Gorkha Regiments) ===
- 1st Gorkha Rifles
- 3rd Gorkha Rifles
- 4th Gorkha Rifles
- 5th Gorkha Rifles
- 8th Gorkha Rifles
- 11th Gorkha Rifles
