= Paramasiva Prabhakar Kumaramangalam =

Indian Army general (1913–2000)

General P P Kumaramangalam DSO, MBE, FRHS
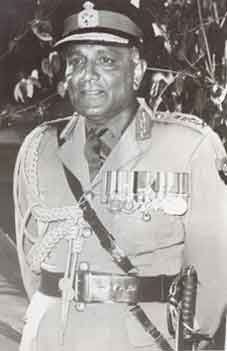

6th Chief of the Army Staff
- In office 8 June 1966 – 7 June 1969
- President: Zakir Husain; V. V. Giri
- Prime Minister: Indira Gandhi
- Preceded by: General Jayanto Nath Chaudhuri
- Succeeded by: Field Marshal S.H.F.J. Manekshaw

Personal details
- Born: Paramasiva Prabhakar Kumaramangalam; 1 July 1913 Kumaramangalam, Salem District, Madras Presidency, British India (now Namakkal district, Tamil Nadu, India)
- Died: 13 March 2000 (aged 86) Chennai, Tamil Nadu, India
- Resting place: Chennai, Tamil Nadu, India
- Military career
- Relatives: P. Subbarayan (Father); Mohan Kumaramangalam (Brother); Rangarajan Mohan Kumaramangalam (Brother's Grandson)
- Allegiance: British India (1933–1947); India (after 1947)
- Branch: British Indian Army; Indian Army
- Service years: 1933–1969
- Rank: General
- Service number: IA-1282
- Unit: Regiment of Artillery
- Commands: Eastern Army
- Conflicts: World War II; Indo-Pakistani War of 1947; Sino-Indian War; Indo-Pakistani War of 1965; Second Sino-Indian War
- Awards: Padma Vibhushan; Distinguished Service Order; Member of the Order of the British Empire

General Paramasiva Prabhakar Kumaramangalam DSO MBE FRHS (1 July 1913 – 13 March 2000) was a senior Indian Army officer, serving as Chief of the Army Staff between 1966 and 1969. He was the last King's Commissioned Indian Officer (KCIO) to lead the Indian Army.

== Early life and education ==
Kumaramangalam was born to P. Subbarayan, who served as Chief Minister of the Madras Presidency between 1926 and 1930, and was a member of the zamindari family of Kumaramangalam from Thiruchengode Taluk, Namakkal District, Tamil Nadu.

He was educated at the preparatory St Hugh's School (then in Kent), and at Eton College. He then studied at the Royal Military Academy, Woolwich, and was commissioned into the British Indian Army as an unattached second lieutenant in 1933. He was appointed to the British Indian Army on 12 November 1934.

== Military life ==
=== World War II ===
During World War II, he was awarded the Distinguished Service Order (DSO) as a temporary major for action in Libya on 27 May 1942 at Point 171, south of Bir Hakiem commanding the 7th Field Battery, 2nd Field Regiment, Indian Artillery.

The citation recommending Kumaramangalam for a Distinguished Service Order runs as follows:

4 June 1942

Captain (Ty. Major) PARAMASIVA PRABHAKAR KUMARAMANGALAM (IA 1282), 2nd Indian Field Regiment, 3rd Indian Motor Brigade

For great courage and devotion to duty.

On 27 May 1942 during the action which took place 3 miles S.E. of BIR HACHEIM, Major Kumaramangalam showed great bravery in controlling the fire of his battery under heavy enemy fire. He continually encouraged the gun detachments, and by his cool demeanour in the face of machine gun and anti-tank fire from enemy tanks undoubtedly inspired his men with the confidence with which they withstood the final tank attack. When one of his troops was over run and captured, he acquired an armoured car left at the position and tried to drive the Italian tanks away which were encircling it. Subsequently he led a patrol back to the position and recovered three guns.

He was taken Prisoner of War (PoW) by the Italians later in 1942 and held in a PoW camp in Italy. With the Italian Armistice in September 1943 he escaped on 19 November; however, he was captured again in January 1944 and imprisoned, this time in Germany, where he was transferred to Stalag Luft III, a high security camp for PoWs. At the end of the war in 1945, he returned to India.

=== Postwar ===
On 18 April 1946, Kumaramangalam was appointed a Member of the Order of the British Empire (MBE). He became an acting Brigadier in 1948, with the substantive rank of lieutenant-colonel, and was promoted to the substantive rank of colonel on 2 February 1951. As a brigadier, he was appointed to command a paratroop brigade on 14 February 1955, and was given command of an infantry division on 9 September 1956, with the acting rank of major-general.

Kumaramangalam was promoted to substantive major-general on 1 August 1958, and appointed the Commandant of the Defence Services Staff College on 25 February 1959. He was appointed Adjutant-General on 5 October 1959, with the acting rank of lieutenant-general. Promoted to lieutenant-general on 8 May 1961, he took over as General Officer Commanding, Eastern Command on 1 May 1963, with appointment as GOC-in-C, Eastern Command on 4 April 1964. On 16 November 1964 he was appointed Deputy Chief of the Army Staff followed by appointment as Vice Chief of the Army Staff on 15 January 1965. General Kumaramangalam took over as the Chief of the Army Staff on 8 June 1966, the first Indian gunner officer and paratrooper to reach this coveted appointment. The tenure of General Kumaramangalam as Chief of the Army Staff was marked by an unpublicised but exhaustive re-organisation of the service, up-gradation of weapons, training and tactics based on the lessons learned from the 1965 War. He served in the Indian Army with distinction for 36 years until his retirement on 7 June 1969. He received the Padma Vibushan in 1970.

=== Views on America ===
General Kumaramangalam trained at the artillery school in Fort Sill, Oklahoma. From his letters it is evident he was not very impressed with the Americans. He saw them as suffering from an "aggressive inferiority complex" and cautioned a newly independent India against coming under American influence. The following is an excerpt from a letter written by him to C. Rajagopalachari in 1947:

"This country is not one that I will ever get fond of. I have not got a very high opinion of them. The people that I have to deal with are very kind, hospitable and have been very good to the two of us. But somehow I feel there is a trace of artificiality in that and also it is the result of trying to impress one. They I think are very jealous of the old world and its background and culture and this results in an aggressive inferiority complex. As for their state of morality, there is none. People seem to delight in trying to outwit each other by any means, mainly crooked. The politicians are racketeers and big business has a tight grip on everything in the country. The small country trader and the farmer I think have their hands securely tied by the big men. I do hope that our country proceeds with caution and doesn't get entirely under the influence of the States."

== Other interests ==
He was also a polo player, horseman, show jumper, and cricketer. He was a member of the Marylebone Cricket Club, a fellow of the Royal Horticultural Society, and president of Indian Polo Association and Equestrian Federation of India. On retirement as army chief, he was elected President of the World Wildlife Fund - India (WWF-India) during its formative stages.

== Death ==
He died following a heart attack on 13 March 2000.

== Awards and decorations ==

Padma Vibhushan	Sena Medal	Sainya Seva Medal	General Service Medal 1947	Indian Independence Medal
Distinguished Service Order	Member of the Order of the British Empire	1939–1945 Star	Africa Star	War Medal 1939–1945

== Dates of rank ==
Insignia	Rank	Component	Date of rank
	Second Lieutenant	British Indian Army	31 August 1933
	Lieutenant	British Indian Army	2 May 1935.
	Captain	British Indian Army	1940 (acting); 3 February 1940 (temporary); 2 February 1941 (substantive)
	Major	British Indian Army	1942 (temporary); 1 July 1946 (substantive)
	Major	Indian Army	15 August 1947 (Note: Upon independence in 1947, India became a Dominion within the British Commonwealth of Nations. As a result, the rank insignia of the British Army, incorporating the Tudor Crown and four-pointed Bath Star ("pip"), was retained, as George VI remained Commander-in-Chief of the Indian Armed Forces. After 26 January 1950, when India became a republic, the President of India became Commander-in-Chief, and the Ashoka Lion replaced the crown, with a five-pointed star being substituted for the "pip.")
	Brigadier	Indian Army	1948 (acting)
	Lieutenant-Colonel	Indian Army	1948
	Lieutenant-Colonel	Indian Army	26 January 1950 (substantive; recommissioning)
	Colonel	Indian Army	2 February 1951
	Brigadier	Indian Army	1955
	Major General	Indian Army	9 September 1956 (acting); 1 August 1958 (substantive)
	Lieutenant-General	Indian Army	5 October 1959 (acting); 8 May 1961 (substantive)
	General (COAS)	Indian Army	8 June 1966

== See also ==
- Chief of Army Staff of the Indian Army

== Notes ==
Military offices
Preceded by P. S. Gyani	Commandant of the Defence Services Staff College; 1963–1964	Succeeded by Sam Manekshaw
Preceded by T. B. Henderson Brooks	General Officer Commanding-in-Chief Eastern Command; 1964–1964	Succeeded by Sam Manekshaw
Preceded by Mohinder Singh Wadalia	Deputy Chief of the Army Staff; 1964–1965	Succeeded by Moti Sagar
New title New office	Vice Chief of the Army Staff; 1965–1966	Succeeded by Kashmir Singh Katoch
Preceded by Joyanto Nath Chaudhuri	Chief of the Army Staff; 1966–1969	Succeeded by Sam Manekshaw
