= Rahul R Singh =

Indian army officer

Lieutenant General Rahul R. Singh AVSM VSM
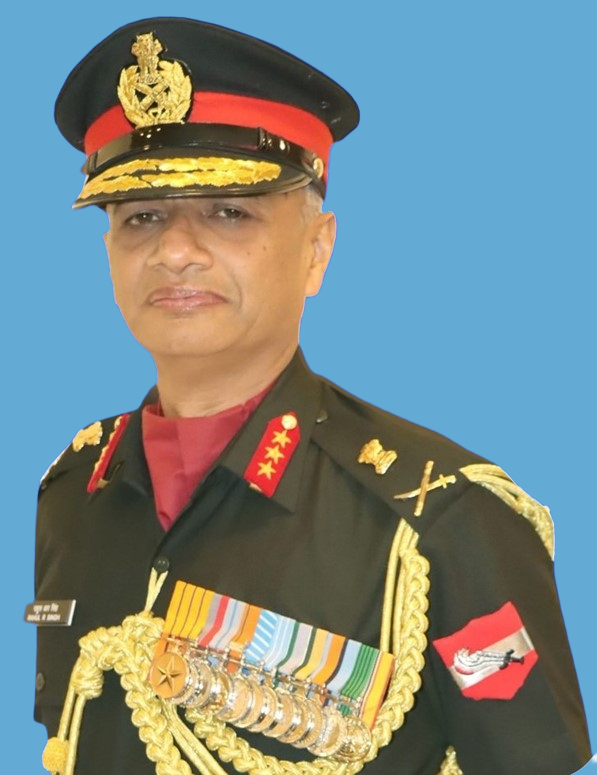
- Military career
- Allegiance: India
- Branch: Indian Army
- Rank: Lieutenant General
- Unit: Regiment of Artillery
- Commands: DG OLSM; II Corps; DCOAS CD&S
- Awards: Ati Vishisht Seva Medal; Vishisht Seva Medal

Rahul R. Singh is a senior officer of the Indian Army who currently serves as the Deputy Chief of the Army Staff (Capability Development & Sustenance).

== Early life and education ==
Rahul R. Singh is an alumnus of the National Defence Academy , Khadakwasla, and the Indian Military Academy, Dehradun. He attended the Defence Services Staff College, Wellington; the College of Defence Management, Secunderabad; and the National Defence College, New Delhi.

== Military career ==
Rahul R. Singh is an officer of the Regiment of Artillery. During his career, he has held a number of command, staff, and instructional appointments.

He has served as an instructor at the National Defence Academy, Khadakwasla, and as the Team Leader of the Indian Army Training Team in Ethiopia. He has also been a staff officer with the United Nations Mission in Angola.

At Army Headquarters, he held the appointment of Director General, Operational Logistics and Strategic Movement (DG OLSM), overseeing strategic mobility and logistic planning for the Indian Army. In May 2023, he took over as the General Officer Commanding (GOC) of the II Corps, also known as Kharga Corps, one of the Indian Army's strike formations based at Ambala.

On 1 November 2024, he was appointed as the Deputy Chief of the Army Staff (Capability Development & Sustenance) at Army Headquarters, responsible for modernization, equipment sustainment, and defence capability planning.

=== Public statements and recent role ===
As Deputy Chief (Capability Development & Sustenance), Lt Gen Singh has publicly emphasized lessons from recent operational experiences and the need to strengthen indigenous production of advanced systems such as drones and EW equipment.

His remarks on 2025 India–Pakistan conflict and related security issues have been widely cited in national media. Subsequently, multiple agencies including PTI and PIB issued fact-checks debunking false or manipulated social media clips misattributing statements to him.

== Honours and decorations ==
The general officer has been awarded the Ati Vishist Seva Medal and the Vishisht Seva Medal for his service towards the army.

Ati Vishisht Seva Medal		Vishisht Seva Medal	
Special Service Medal	Operation Vijay Medal		Sainya Seva Medal
High Altitude Medal	Videsh Seva Medal	75th Independence Anniversary Medal	50th Independence Anniversary Medal
30 Years Long Service Medal	20 Years Long Service Medal	9 Years Long Service Medal	UNAVEM
