= Sushil Kumar Pillai =

Indian Army general (1934–2015)

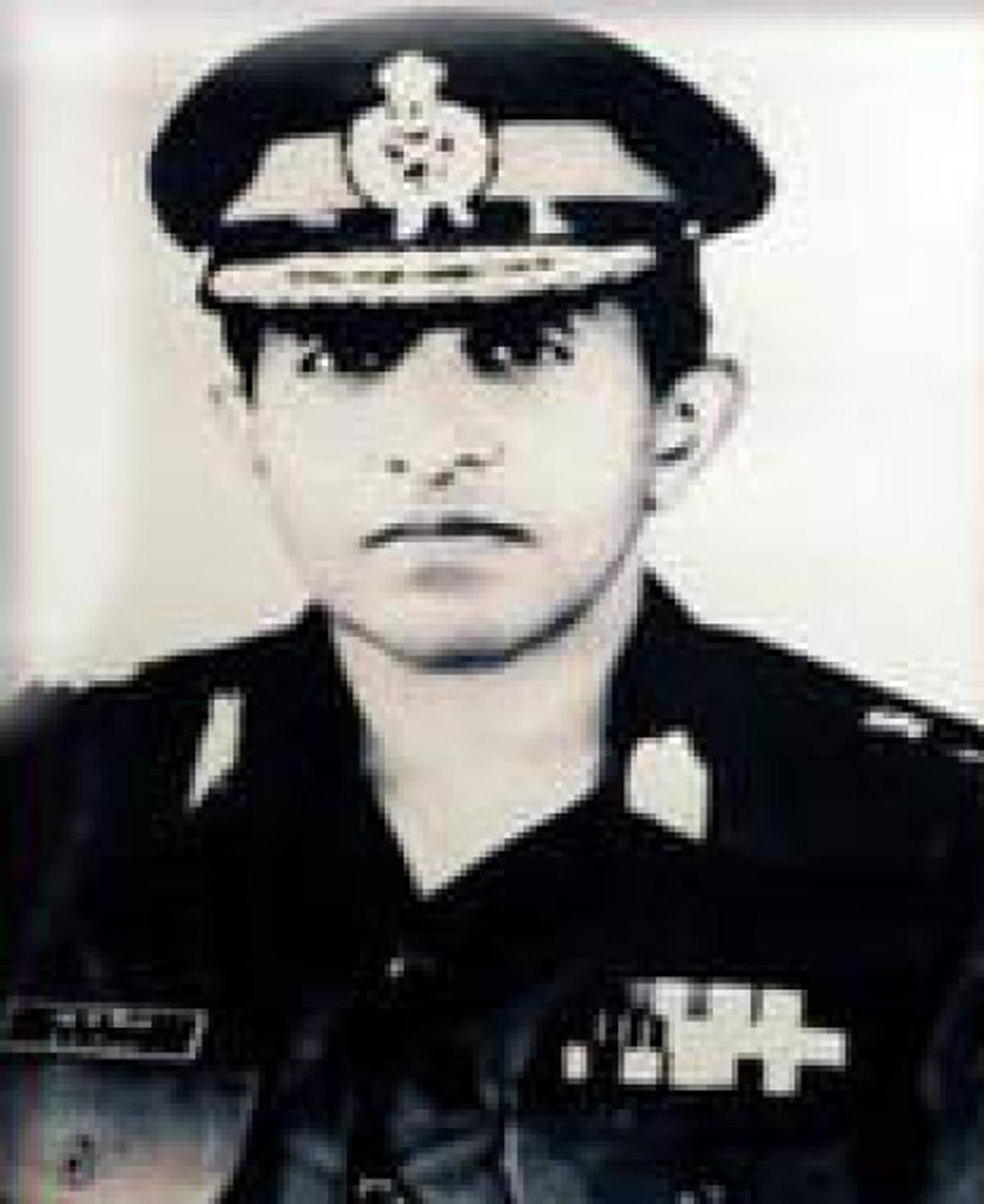
- Born: 14 January 1934; Nagpur, British India
- Died: 8 April 2015
- Relatives: Sir N. R. Pillai, K. R. Elenkath, Kesava Pillai of Kandamath, Dewan Nanoo Pillai
- Military career
- Allegiance: India
- Branch: Indian Army
- Service years: 1955–2015
- Rank: Lieutenant General
- Nickname: S. K.
- Unit: Assam Regiment
- Awards: Param Vishisht Seva Medal
- Other work: Assam Vikram, Regimental History of the Assam Regiment

Lieutenant General Sushil Kumar "S. K." Pillai, PVSM (14 January 1934 – 8 April 2015) was an Indian Army General. He was best known for the role he played in quelling the troubles in India's north-east region. He was Colonel of the Assam Regiment from 1987 to 1991 and was awarded the Param Vishisht Seva Medal in 1989. He continued to remain active after his retirement in 1991.

== Early life ==
Born on 14 January 1934, at Nagpur, in the aristocratic Elenkath family of Travancore, a nephew of Sir Narayana Raghavan Pillai of Elenkath he was commissioned into the 3rd Battalion of the Assam Regiment in 1955. He married an English lady named Mary Jane in New Delhi

== Military career ==
During his Army career spanning over 36 years, he has held staff and instructional appointments including those of Military Attache in the erstwhile USSR and Mongolia during the Brezhnew Era, Deputy Chief of Staff, and Director General of Infantry. He commanded the 1st Battalion of the Assam Regiment from April 1970 to June 1972. He led the 14 Infantry Division and the 10 Corps.

== Writings ==
As an expert on the North East, he wrote two monographs on the Nagas and the Mizos. He was an Associate Editor of Faultlines along with Kanwar Pal Singh Gill and V. S. Jafa, a journal on conflict resolution. He dissected some important issues concerning India's internal security.

He analysed the causes of insurgency in Nagaland and linked it to the issues of Naga identity and ethnicity. Tracing the growth of Naga insurgency, its leaders and the present situation, he has questioned a number of measures adopted by the Government of India. He has stated that the foisting of a typical democratic state apparatus based on adult franchise is alien to the Naga culture which is based on village leadership grown out of tribal customs.

He has also authored Assam Vikram, the regimental history of the Assam Regiment.

== Death ==
On 8 April 2015, following a failed battle with cancer, he died at his residence in Kowdiar, Trivandrum and his funeral was conducted before sunset as per Nair customs with full honours. In a tribute issued shortly afterwards, Lt Gen Subrata Saha, Colonel Commandant of the Assam Regiment said, "He will be remembered for his outstanding contribution to the Assam Regiment, the Indian Army and the nation".
