= Ramesh Halagali =

Lieutenant General Ramesh Halgali
- Born: Halagali, Mudhol, Bagalkot, Karnataka, India
- Military career
- Allegiance: India
- Branch: Indian Army
- Service years: December 1972–2012
- Rank: Lieutenant General
- Unit: Sikh Light Infantry
- Commands: Director General of Military Training; Deputy Chief of Army Staff
- Awards: Param Vishisht Seva Medal; Ati Vishisht Seva Medal; Sena Medal

Lieutenant General Ramesh Halgali PVSM, AVSM, SM is a retired General Officer of the Indian Army who served as the Deputy Chief of Army Staff.

== Early life and education ==
Halgali was born in Bagalkot district, Karnataka. He studied at Sainik School Bijapur and later graduated from the Indian Military Academy. He was commissioned into the 1st Battalion of the Sikh Light Infantry in December 1972.

He attended the Defence Services Staff College, the Higher Command Course at the Army War College, and the National Defence College, India.

== Military career ==
Halgali commanded the 1st Battalion of the Sikh Light Infantry, 12 Infantry Brigade and 19 Infantry Division on the Line of Control in Kashmir. He later served as GOC 11 Corps in Punjab. During his tenure of over 20 years in Kashmir, several terrorists were eliminated and more than 500 voluntarily surrendered with weapons, many of whom had crossed the border from Pakistan. Additionally, the important international bridge over the River Kalyane da Khas was constructed during his tenure, enabling Indian and Pakistan citizens to build on civilizational values and execute peaceful trade between the two countries. His contribution in Sadhbhavana projects like schools, hospitals, adventure activities, vocational skills and computer training were instituted in his sector, and these were recorded as Praiseworthy actions towards winning the Hearts and Minds of the people of Kashmir.

His important Instructional and Staff assignments include, Instructor at Indian Military Academy, Instructor at Infantry School, Brigade Major 190 Mountain Brigade Pemgarh, Colonel MS-1 Army Headquarters, Colonel Strategy PP Directorate, BGS 15 Corps Srinagar, BGS Northern CommandUdhampur, Chief of Staff 33 Corps Siliguri, Chief of Staff HQ Southern Command Pune, Director General Military Training, Deputy Chief of Army Staff.

He was appointed Director General of Military Training before becoming Deputy Chief of Army Staff on 11 February 2012.

At the age of 59, he performed a solo skydive from over 12000 feet with less than two hours of training. This record breaking jump is featured in the Limca Book of World Records 2013 edition.

== Awards and decorations ==
Halgali has been awarded the Sena Medal (Gallantry), the Ati Vishisht Seva Medal, and the Param Vishisht Seva Medal for distinguished service in the Indian Army. On 18 April 2018, he was the first Indian to receive the International Leadership Award for Fight against Global Terrorism in New York from USA and Great Britain. He has worked tirelessly towards the Strategic Development of Karnataka. The Karnataka Government has awarded him with the Sangoli Rayanna Award, Shivappa Keladi Nayaka Award, Rajyotsava and Karnataka Ratna Award.

== Other activities ==
Post retirement, he has participated in public discussions and defence events, including engagements hosted by the Bangalore International Centre. He is a Public Speaker at the Corporate, Industrial, Universities, and Research centres.
