= 63rd Cavalry (India) =

Indian Army regiment

- Active: 1957–present
- Country: India
- Allegiance: India
- Branch: Indian Army
- Type: Cavalry
- Size: Regiment
- Nickname: Tresath
- Mottos: पराक्रम ही धर्म है Parakram Hi Dharam Hai (Valour is but Duty)
- Battle honours: Battle Honour Bogra; Theatre Honour East Pakistan

Commanders
- Colonel of the Regiment: Lieutenant General Devendra Sharma
- Notable commanders: Lt Gen SPM Tripathi PVSM, AVSM; Lt Gen Shamsher Singh Mehta, PVSM, AVSM & Bar, VSM; Lt Gen JS Varma, PVSM, AVSM, ADC; Lt Gen Kamal Jit Singh, PVSM, AVSM & Bar

Insignia
- Abbreviation: 63 Cav

63rd Cavalry is an armoured regiment of the Indian Army.

== Raising ==
It was raised on 2 January 1957 at Alwar, Rajasthan. Lieutenant Colonel Harmandar Singh (later Brigadier) was the first commanding officer. The third armoured regiment to be raised under the government sanctions of 1956, the regiment was initially equipped with two squadrons of Stuart Mk VI tanks and a squadron of Humber Mk 4 armoured cars. The ranks were raised from various armoured regiments and consists of Rajputs, Jats, Sikhs.

== Independent squadron ==
In April 1958, the Humber squadron proceeded to Khanabal in Kashmir for a tour of duty till July 1959. The Humber squadron was later hived off as an independent reconnaissance squadron. This ‘5 Independent Squadron’ of 63rd Cavalry served in 1960-61 in the Congo Crisis as part of 99th Indian Infantry Brigade under the ONUC peacekeeping mission of the United Nations. An integral squadron was re-raised with Daimler Armoured Cars in August 1961

== Operations ==
United Nations Operation in the Congo

In 1961, one squadron under Major MS Padda, AVSM was sent to Congo as part of the United Nation forces. In 1962, the squadron was replaced by another under Major Moti Singh. Both squadrons won a total of 13 gallantry awards.

Sino-Indian War

The regiment operated under IV Corps in October 1962 during the war and remained in the sector till October 1963. One troop with Humber Armoured Cars was inducted in Chushul sector in Ladakh.

Indo-Pakistani War of 1971

In 1971, the regiment was re-equipped with T-55 tanks and PT-76 amphibious tanks, participating in combat operations in the Bangladesh front of the Indo-Pakistani War of 1971, entering Dacca in the final stages of the campaign. The tendency of 63rd Cavalry's tanks to appear from any of the four cardinal directions led to the enemy giving it the epithet of the "ghost" regiment.

Bogra was an important road and rail hub in the northwest of erstwhile East Pakistan defended by troops of Pakistani 16 Infantry Division. Bogra was assaulted by formations of 20 Infantry Division of the Indian Army. A squadron of 63rd Cavalry supported the successful assault of the 2nd battalion, 5th Gorkha Rifles in the cantonment area on 14 and 15 December 1971, for which the regiment was awarded the battle honour "Bogra" and the theatre honour "East Pakistan 1971". It won 8 gallantry awards for the 1971 operations. To date, troops of 63rd Cavalry have earned more than 50 awards including the Vir Chakra and Sena medal for gallantry under fire and the Param Vishisht Seva Medal for distinguished service.

Counter insurgency operations

5 Independent Squadron, equipped with Ferret scout cars was deployed in a counter insurgency role between 1963 and 1971 in Mizo Hills, Naga Hills, Manipur and Tripura.

The regiment took part in anti-terrorist operations in Punjab between January 1993 and April 1996. It took part in Operation Rakshak between May 2002 and December 2005.

Other operations

It took part in Operation Trident as part of 1 Armoured Division in the Western sector. It took part in Operation Parakram in Jammu and Kashmir.

== Presentation of Guidon ==
The regiment celebrated its Silver Jubilee on 2 January 1982 on which occasion it was presented with a guidon by the then President of India, Neelam Sanjiva Reddy. A first day cover was released during the Golden Jubilee celebrations in Roorkee.

== Regimental insignia ==
The Regimental cap badge consists of a tank with a scroll below with the words '63 Cavalry'.

The motto of the regiment is पराक्रम ही धर्म है (Parakram Hi Dharam Hai), which translates to Valour is but Duty.
