= 51st Armoured Regiment (India) =

Indian Army regiment

- Active: 1987 – present
- Country: India
- Allegiance: India
- Branch: Indian Army
- Type: Armour
- Size: Regiment
- Nickname: The Unicorn
- Mottos: हर मैदान फतेह; Har Maidan Fateh (Victory in every field)
- Colors: Scarlet, Silver Grey and Oxford Blue
- Equipment: T-72

Commanders
- Colonel of the Regiment: Lieutenant General Vipul Singhal

Insignia
- Abbreviation: 51 Armd Regt

51st Armoured Regiment is an armoured regiment which is part of the Armoured Corps of the Indian Army.

== Formation ==
The regiment was raised on 31 May 1987 by Lt Col R.S. Gill at Ahmednagar with the designation of 'B' Tank Regiment. This was subsequently changed on 15 July 1989 to 51 Armoured Regiment. The first Colonel of the Regiment was Lt Gen S.S. Mehta, AVSM and Bar, VSM. The regiment has an all India, all class composition.

== History ==
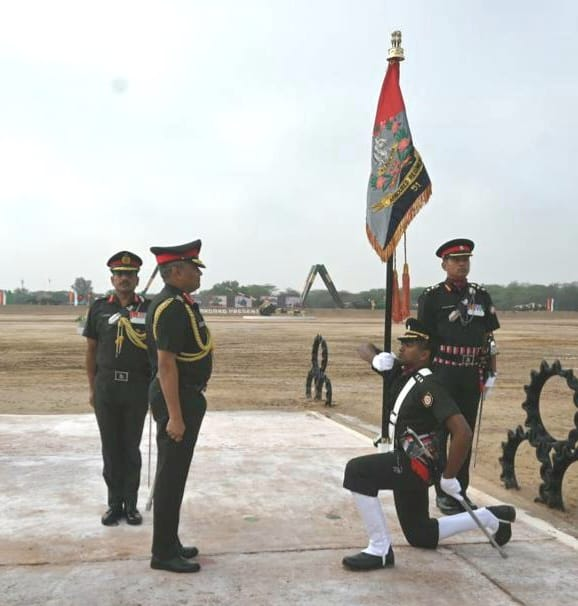
General Manoj Pande presenting the prestigious ‘President’s Standards’ to 51 Armoured Regiment, March 2023

Soon after raising, on the assassination of Rajiv Gandhi, the regiment was involved in aid to civil authorities when it was deployed in Karnal District. It was also involved in internal security duties during Operation Rakshak II.

The Regiment had the honour of participating in the Republic Day parade in 1999 with their T-72 tanks.

The Regiment foiled an attack on the Ratnuchak camp in Jammu in the wee hours of 30 December 2018, when the sentry fired at two Jaish-e-Mohammad (JeM) terrorists.

The Chief of Army Staff, General Manoj Pande presented the President's Standards to the regiment at Suratgarh military station on 25 March 2023.

== Regimental Insignia ==
The cap badge of the regiment is a unicorn head which was suggested by Lt Col NJS Pannu. The mythical beast finds mention in Indian historical texts, and represents ‘purity’ and ‘closeness to God’. The initial badge showed a unicorn head facing to the right but the design was considered unsatisfactory and it was replaced with a unicorn head facing the left in silhouette. The head rests on a scroll inscribed with the words "51 KAVACHIT REGIMENT" (meaning 51st Armoured Regiment) in Devanagari script. The regiment has a nickname "the Unicorn" on account of its cap badge.

The shoulder title consists of the numeral "51" in brass.

The motto of the regiment is हर मैदान फतेह (Har Maidan Fateh), which translates to ‘Victory in every field’. The colours of the regiment are Scarlet, Silver Grey and Oxford Blue depicting sacrifice, heroism and determined resistance.
