= Chief of the Army Staff (India) =

Professional head of the Army

- Flag of the Chief of the Army Staff

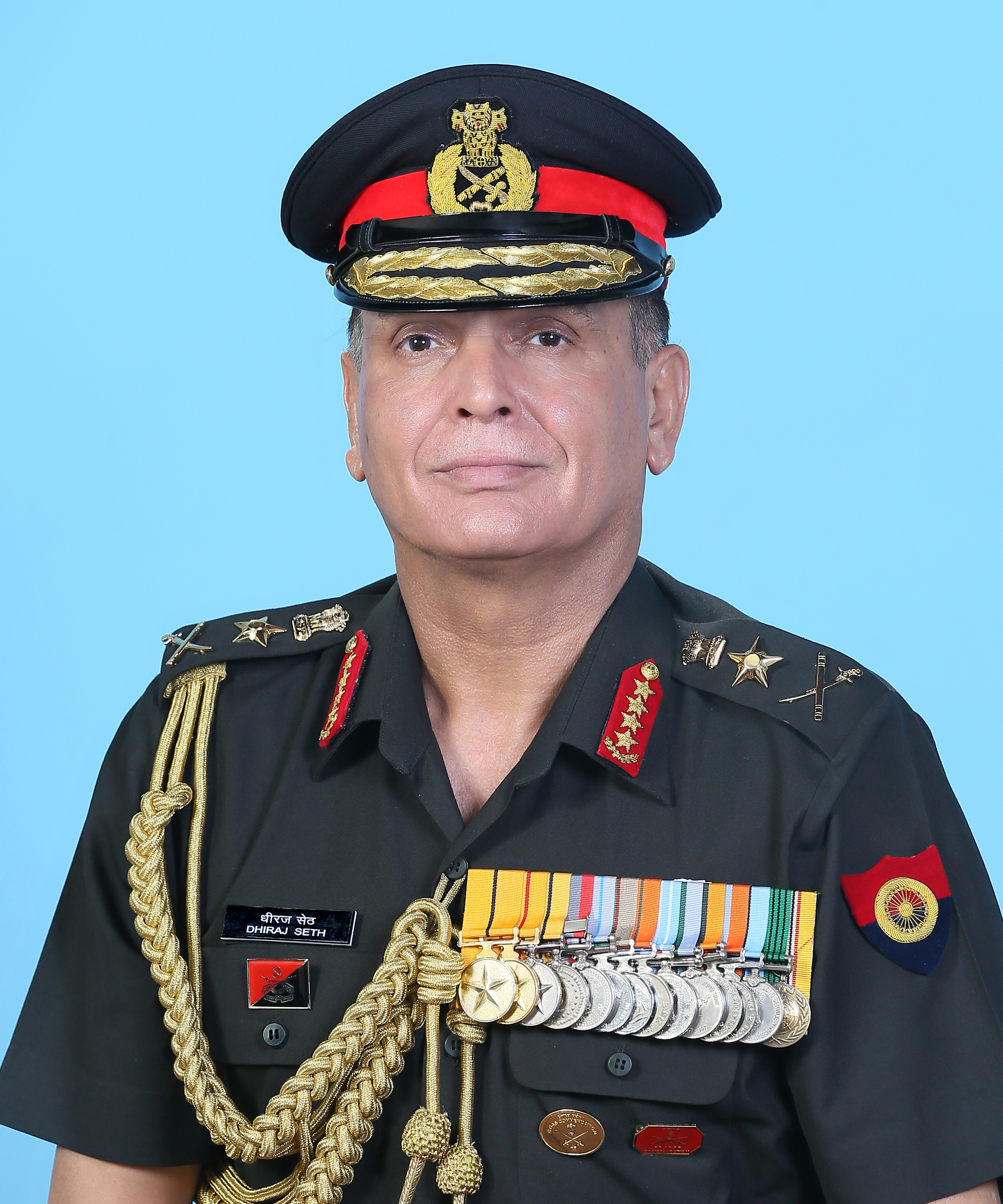
- Incumbent; General Dhiraj Seth; PVSM UYSM AVSM since 30 June 2026
- Indian Army
- Status: Professional head of land forces branch of the Indian Armed Forces.
- Abbreviation: COAS
- Member of: Defence Acquisition Council; Defence Planning Committee; National Security Council
- Reports to: President of India; Prime Minister of India; Minister of Defence; Chief of Defence Staff
- Residence: Army House, Residence 4, Rajaji Marg, New Delhi
- Seat: Integrated HQ of MoD (Army), South Block, Central Secretariat, New Delhi
- Appointer: Appointments Committee of the Cabinet (ACC)
- Term length: 3 years or at the age of 62, whichever is earlier.; (no renewal)
- Constituting instrument: Army Act, 1950 (Act No. 46 of 1950)
- Precursor: Chief of the Army Staff and Commander-in-Chief, Indian Army
- Formation: 21 June 1948; 78 years ago
- First holder: General Rob Lockhart
- Deputy: Vice Chief of the Army Staff (VCOAS)
- Salary: Pay level 18 ₹250,000 (US$2,600) monthly

The Chief of the Army Staff (COAS) has been the title of the professional head of the Indian Army (IA) since 1956 India. The COAS is a permanent member of the Chiefs of Staff Committee, National Security Council and Defence Planning Committee and serves as a senior advisor to the Minister of Defence, Prime Minister and the President, who is the supreme commander of the Defence Forces. The position is customarily held by a four-star general and is usually the highest ranking army officer on active duty unless the Chief of Defence Staff is an army officer. Prior to 1955, the position was known as the Commander in Chief, Indian Army.

Statutorily, the COAS ranks 12th-overall in the Indian order of precedence, and is the IA's status-equivalent of the Chief of Defence Staff, the Chief of the Naval Staff and the Chief of the Air Staff - all three positions of which are also occupied by four-star officers from the armed forces.

== Description ==
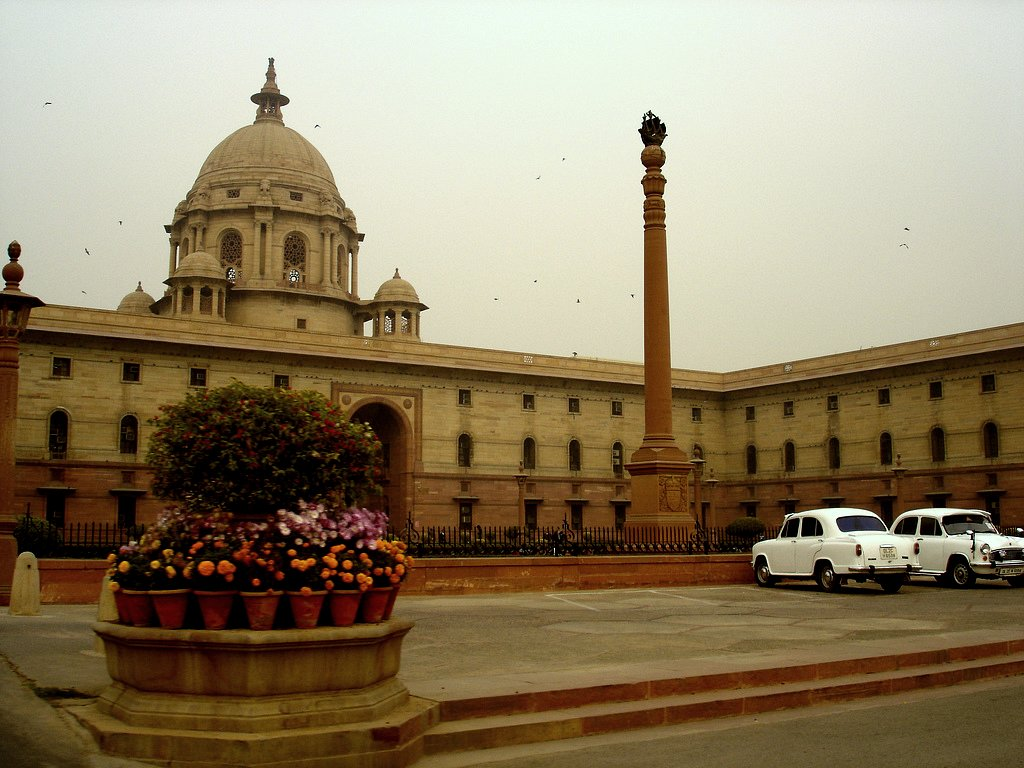
The South Block, Central Secretariat, New Delhi - the station of the IHQ of MoD (Army), where the COAS is seated.

=== Roles and responsibilities ===
Seated at the Integrated Headquarters of Ministry of Defence, stationed in New Delhi, the COAS is the senior-most operational officer of the IA, and is tasked with the following:

- Advising the Central Government on all matters privy to the IA.
- Commitment to enhancing the force's capabilities towards sustaining combat readiness and operational effectiveness during periods of peace and conflict.
- Coordinating various components of the IA towards ensuring the protection-cum-realization of the nation's territorial integrity-cum-sovereignty during states of armed conflict or war.
- Providing direction towards the overall functioning of the organisation's facets, such as command, control, administration and strategy.
- Convening courts-martial at the behest of the Central Government to review cases of misconduct during peace and wartime.
- Reviewing the judicial sentencing and pleas of officers convicted of professional misconduct whilst in service.

In addition to these responsibilities, the COAS is also a permanent member of:

- Chiefs of Staff Committee (COSC)
- National Security Council (NSC)
- Defence Planning Committee (DPC)
- Defence Acquisition Council (DAC)

The office's eminence in the aforementioned groups thus grants the appointee with the role to advise the minister of defence (Raksha Mantri or RM) on the affairs related to the IA's functioning and the promotion of an comprehensive integrated planning policy with respect to the affairs of tri-service integration, doctrinal strategy, capability development, defence acquisition and infrastructure.

=== Structure ===
As the professional head of the force, the COAS is assisted by one subordinate officer and three principal staff officers, namely:

- Subordinate:
  - Vice Chief of Army Staff (VCOAS)
- Principal staff officers:
  - Deputy Chief of the Army Staff (Capability Development and Sustenance) (DCOAS - CD&S)
  - Deputy Chief of the Army Staff (Information Systems and Training) (DCOAS - IS&T)
  - Deputy Chief of the Army Staff (Strategy) (DCOAS - Strategy)

=== Promotion ===
Beginning in the pre-independence era, the office of COAS has customarily been held by a four-star general. The move to appoint a new designate to the position usually begins three months before the change-of-command, wherein the Ministry of Defence (MoD) reviews the résumés of the IA's sole vice chief of Army Staff (VCOAS) and five general officer commanding-in-chiefs (of the force's five combatant commands) - all of whom are lieutenant generals, before making a decision. Appointments to the position are made by the Appointments Committee of the Cabinet (ACC) - comprising the prime minister and the minister of defence, upon recommendation from the IHQ of MoD (Army); appointees to the office are automatically deemed promoted to the rank of general.

Notably, for the first two decades following India's independence, the C-in-C and the successor COAS were the only four-star officers in the Indian Armed Forces, while the chiefs of the Indian Navy (IN) and Indian Air Force (IAF) were headed by three-star vice admirals and air marshals, respectively; the first chiefs to be promoted to four-star ranks of admiral and air chief marshal occurred in 1968 and 1966, respectively.

Since 1950, the senior-most lieutenant generals in the IA's command cadre have customarily been appointed COAS, nevertheless, this tradition has been broken twice, first in 1983 - when then-prime minister Indira Gandhi chose to appoint then-Lieutenant General A. K. Vaidya to supersede one senior officer, and in 2016 - when prime minister Narendra Modi chose to appoint then-Lieutenant General Bipin Rawat to supersede two senior officers.

=== Tenure ===
According to the IA's Army Rules, 1954 - a COAS-appointee reaches superannuation upon the completion of three years in the position or at the age of 62, whichever is earlier. However, an appointee may also be dismissed from office by the president of India before the conclusion of the tenure under Section 18-19 of the Army Act, 1950 and Article 310 of the Constitution.

Additionally, the appointee is eligible for an extension in tenure beyond the age of superannuation, as defined by Rule 16 A (4) Army Rules, 1954. However, extensions to serving appointees have been rare, and have only been granted twice since 1947; first in June 1972 to General S. H. F. J. Manekshaw, who received a six-month extension which allowed him to serve until January 1973; and in May 2024 to General Manoj Pande, who received a one-month extension which allowed to serve until June 2024.

Previously, in the event of an abrupt stoppage during the incumbent's tenure - by termination, resignation or sudden demise, the senior-most lieutenant-general in IA's command cadre has customarily been appointed the successor; this situation has occurred twice in the past: first in 1962 - when then-Lieutenant General J. N. Chaudhuri was appointed after the resignation of then-incumbent General Pran Nath Thapar, and again in 1993 - when then-Lieutenant General Shankar Roychowdhury was appointed after the sudden demise of then-incumbent General B. C. Joshi.

Additionally, a COAS-appointee is also eligible to be selected for the position of Chief of Defence Staff (CDS), in accordance with the Army (Amendment) Regulations, 2022 - which prescribes that the designated nominee, in this case the COAS, must be under the age of 62 at the time of appointment as CDS. The first COAS to be appointed CDS was General Bipin Rawat.

== History ==
=== Pre-independence era (1748–1947) ===
The position's initial roots finds its origins in the 18th century, when the East India Company (EIC) - a British-origin trade establishment and the then-de facto administrative organisation of the Indian subcontinent, established the position of Commander-in-Chief, India (C-in-C) in 1748 to head its three Presidency Armies, namely the Bengal Army, the Bombay Army and the Madras Army. Following the 1857-58 Indian rebellion against EIC rule, the control of the Presidency Armies was transferred directly to the British Crown, which succeeded the EIC as the official ruling-cum-governing entity of India. In 1895, the three armies were merged to form a unified British Indian Army (BIA), under the direct control of the C-in-C. Following the Kitchener Reforms in 1903, up until the establishment of India's independence in 1947, the C-in-C functioned as the supreme commander of the armed forces in the subcontinent, liaising directly with the Governor-General of India over the administrative affairs of the stationed military.

=== Dominion-era (1947–1950) ===
Following independence and the subsequent partition of the subcontinent, the BIA was bifurcated into two new entities: the modern-day Indian Army (IA) - responsible for the Dominion of India, and the newly-formed Pakistan Army (PA) - responsible for the Dominion of Pakistan. However, the post of C-in-C was trifurcated into three positions: the C-in-C Indian Army, the C-in-C Pakistan Army and the Supreme Commander India and Pakistan.

Following independence, the IA retained GHQ India, New Delhi - headed by General Sir Rob Lockhart as the first post-independence C-in-C, while the PA established its headquarters at GHQ Pakistan, Rawalpindi - headed by General Frank Messervy (later succeeded by General Sir Douglas Gracey) as its inaugural C-in-C. Nevertheless, the two forces were directed under the auspices of the Supreme Commander's Headquarters (Supreme HQ), headed by Field Marshal Sir Claude Auchinleck, the Supreme Commander. In January 1948, the position of Supreme Commander was abolished and bifurcated into the positions of Commander British Forces in India and the Commander British Forces in Pakistan, located at Bombay and Karachi, respectively, and with the responsibility of overseeing the repatriation of British military units to the United Kingdom. In June 1948, the title of C-in-C was modified with the prefix Chief of the Army Staff, and re-designated as Chief of the Army Staff and Commander-in-Chief, Indian Army (COAS & C-in-C).

In January 1949, upon the impending retirement of General Sir Roy Bucher - the IA's second C-in-C, the Government of India considered the decision to appoint a native Indian general officer to the position; up until then, Indian officers had only achieved the positions associated with the three-star rank of lieutenant general. Three lieutenant-generals were shortlisted as candidates for the position, namely:

- Lieutenant General K. M. Cariappa - General Officer Commanding-in-Chief, Western Command.
- Lieutenant General Nathu Singh Rathore - General Officer Commanding-in-Chief, Eastern Command.
- Lieutenant General S. M. Shrinagesh - General Officer Commanding, XV Corps; also overall commander of Indian troops during the 1947-48 Indo-Pakistani War.

Ultimately, Cariappa was chosen to succeed Bucher, which he did on 15 January 1949, with the substantive rank of a four-star general - which thus made him the first Indian-origin general and first native chief of the Indian Army; the day of his appointment has been commemorated annually ever since as Army Day. Shrinagesh, nevertheless, later served as COAS from 1955 to 1957.

=== Republic-era (1950–present) ===
In 1955, the designation of the position was shortened to simply Chief of the Army Staff (COAS) through the Commanders-In-Chief (Change in Designation) Act, 1955; as a result of the Act, the tenure of the then-serving C-in-C - General Rajendrasinhji Jadeja, continued under the new designation.

In January 1973, General S. H. F. J. Manekshaw, the Indian Army's seventh COAS, was promoted to the five-star rank of field marshal, in recognition of his leadership during the 1971 Indo-Pakistani War - which made him the only-serving COAS to have ever been promoted to the rank. K. M. Cariappa, the second C-in-C of the Indian Army too was promoted to field marshal thirteen years later, in January 1986; however, unlike Manekshaw, he had superannuated at the rank of general in 1953 and had been in retirement for thirty-three years before his elevation. To note, although a field marshal is nominally the highest-ranking officer in the IA, the rank is titular with no operational duties attached, which leaves the COAS as the highest operationally-active officer in the IA.

== Appointees ==
The undermentioned table chronicles the appointees to the office of Commander-in-Chief, Indian Army (C-in-C) and the successor office of Chief of Army Staff (COAS), beginning from August 1947 to the present-day. Ranks and honours are as at the completion of their tenure.

=== List of chiefs of the Army Staff ===
Commanders-in-chief have been:

† denotes people who died in office.

Commanders-in-Chief, Indian Army (1947–1948)

No.	Portrait	Name	Took office	Left office	Time in office	Unit of Commission
1	Sir Robert McGregor Macdonald Lockhart, KCB, CIE, MC	General; Sir Robert McGregor Macdonald Lockhart, KCB, CIE, MC (1893–1981) (Note: Formerly British Indian Army. Seconded from the British Army.)	15 August 1947	31 December 1947	108 days	51st Sikhs
2	Sir Francis Robert Roy Bucher, KBE, CB, MC	General; Sir Francis Robert Roy Bucher, KBE, CB, MC (1895–1980)	1 January 1948	20 June 1948	171 days	4th Cameronians

Chiefs of the Army Staff and Commanders-in-Chief, Indian Army (1948–1955)

No.	Portrait	Name	Took office	Left office	Time in office	Unit of Commission
1	Sir Francis Robert Roy Bucher, KBE, CB, MC	General; Sir Francis Robert Roy Bucher, KBE, CB, MC (1895–1980)	21 June 1948	14 January 1949	208 days	4th Cameronians
2	Kodandera Madappa Cariappa OBE	General (Note: Later promoted to Field marshal); Kodandera Madappa Cariappa OBE (1899–1993)	15 January 1949	14 January 1953	3 years, 365 days	88th Carnatic Infantry
3	Maharaj Shri Rajendrasinhji Jadeja, DSO	General; Maharaj Shri Rajendrasinhji Jadeja, DSO (1899–1964)	14 January 1953	1 April 1955	2 years, 77 days	2nd Lancers (Gardner's Horse)

Chiefs of the Army Staff (1955–present)

No.	Portrait	Name	Took office	Left office	Time in office	Unit of Commission
1	Maharaj Shri Rajendrasinhji Jadeja, DSO	General; Maharaj Shri Rajendrasinhji Jadeja, DSO (1899–1964)	1 April 1955	14 May 1955	43 days	2nd Lancers (Gardner's Horse)
2	Satyawant Mallana Srinagesh	General; Satyawant Mallana Srinagesh (1903–1977)	15 May 1955	7 May 1957	1 year, 357 days	19th Hyderabad Regiment
3	Kodandera Subayya Thimayya, DSO	General; Kodandera Subayya Thimayya, DSO (1906–1965)	8 May 1957	7 May 1961	4 years, 0 days	19th Hyderabad Regiment
4	Pran Nath Thapar	General; Pran Nath Thapar (1906–1975)	8 May 1961	19 November 1962	1 year, 195 days	1st Punjab Regiment
5	Jayanto Nath Chaudhuri, OBE	General; Jayanto Nath Chaudhuri, OBE (1908–1983)	20 November 1962	7 June 1966	3 years, 199 days	16th Light Cavalry
6	Paramasiva Prabhakar Kumaramangalam, DSO, MBE	General; Paramasiva Prabhakar Kumaramangalam, DSO, MBE (1913–2000)	8 June 1966	7 June 1969	2 years, 364 days	Regiment of Artillery
7	Sam Hormusji Framji Jamshedji Manekshaw, MC	Field Marshal; Sam Hormusji Framji Jamshedji Manekshaw, MC (1914–2008)	8 June 1969	15 January 1973	3 years, 221 days	8th Gorkha Rifles
8	Gopal Gurunath Bewoor, PVSM	General; Gopal Gurunath Bewoor, PVSM (1916–1989)	16 January 1973	31 May 1975	2 years, 135 days	Dogra Regiment
9	Tapishwar Narain Raina, MVC, SM	General; Tapishwar Narain Raina, MVC, SM (1921–1980)	1 June 1975	31 May 1978	2 years, 364 days	Kumaon Regiment
10	Om Prakash Malhotra, PVSM	General; Om Prakash Malhotra, PVSM (1922–2015)	1 June 1978	31 May 1981	2 years, 364 days	Regiment of Artillery
11	Kotikalapudi Venkata Krishna Rao, PVSM	General; Kotikalapudi Venkata Krishna Rao, PVSM (1923–2016)	1 June 1981	31 July 1983	1 year, 364 days	Mahar Regiment
12	Arunkumar Shridhar Vaidya, PVSM, MVC**, AVSM	General; Arunkumar Shridhar Vaidya, PVSM, MVC**, AVSM (1926–1986)	1 August 1983	31 January 1986	2 years, 244 days	The Deccan Horse (9 Horse)
13	Krishnaswamy Sundarji, PVSM	General; Krishnaswamy Sundarji, PVSM (1928–1999)	1 February 1986	31 May 1988	2 years, 120 days	Mahar Regiment
14	Vishwa Nath Sharma, PVSM, AVSM, ADC	General; Vishwa Nath Sharma, PVSM, AVSM, ADC (1930–2026)	1 June 1988	30 June 1990	2 years, 29 days	16th Light Cavalry
15	Sunith Francis Rodrigues, PVSM, VSM	General; Sunith Francis Rodrigues, PVSM, VSM (1933–2022)	1 July 1990	30 June 1993	2 years, 364 days	Regiment of Artillery
16	Bipin Chandra Joshi, PVSM, AVSM, ADC†	General; Bipin Chandra Joshi, PVSM, AVSM, ADC† (1935–1994)	1 July 1993	19 November 1994	1 year, 141 days	64th Cavalry
17	Shankar Roy Chowdhary, PVSM, ADC	General; Shankar Roy Chowdhary, PVSM, ADC (born 1937)	20 November 1994	30 September 1997	2 years, 314 days	20th Lancers
18	Ved Prakash Malik, PVSM, AVSM	General; Ved Prakash Malik, PVSM, AVSM (born 1939)	1 October 1997	30 September 2000	2 years, 365 days	Sikh Light Infantry
19	Sundararajan Padmanabhan, PVSM, AVSM, VSM	General; Sundararajan Padmanabhan, PVSM, AVSM, VSM (1940–2024)	1 October 2000	31 December 2002	2 years, 91 days	Regiment of Artillery
20	Nirmal Chander Vij PVSM, UYSM, AVSM	General; Nirmal Chander Vij PVSM, UYSM, AVSM (born 1943)	1 January 2003	31 January 2005	2 years, 30 days	Dogra Regiment
21	Joginder Jaswant Singh, PVSM, AVSM, VSM, ADC	General; Joginder Jaswant Singh, PVSM, AVSM, VSM, ADC (born 1945)	1 February 2005	30 September 2007	2 years, 241 days	Maratha Light Infantry
22	Deepak Kapoor, PVSM, AVSM, SM, VSM, ADC	General; Deepak Kapoor, PVSM, AVSM, SM, VSM, ADC (born 1948)	1 October 2007	31 March 2010	2 years, 181 days	Regiment of Artillery
23	Vijay Kumar Singh, PVSM, AVSM, YSM, ADC	General; Vijay Kumar Singh, PVSM, AVSM, YSM, ADC (born 1950)	1 April 2010	31 May 2012	2 years, 60 days	Rajput Regiment
24	Bikram Singh PVSM, UYSM, AVSM, SM, VSM, ADC	General; Bikram Singh PVSM, UYSM, AVSM, SM, VSM, ADC (born 1952)	1 June 2012	31 July 2014	2 years, 60 days	Sikh Light Infantry
25	Dalbir Singh Suhag, PVSM, UYSM, AVSM, VSM, ADC	General; Dalbir Singh Suhag, PVSM, UYSM, AVSM, VSM, ADC (born 1954)	1 August 2014	31 December 2016	2 years, 152 days	5th Gorkha Rifles
26	Bipin Rawat, PVSM, UYSM, AVSM, YSM, SM, VSM, ADC	General; Bipin Rawat, PVSM, UYSM, AVSM, YSM, SM, VSM, ADC (1958–2021)	31 December 2016	31 December 2019	3 years	11th Gorkha Rifles
27	Manoj Mukund Naravane, PVSM, AVSM, SM, VSM, ADC	General; Manoj Mukund Naravane, PVSM, AVSM, SM, VSM, ADC (born 1960)	31 December 2019	30 April 2022	2 years, 120 days	Sikh Light Infantry
28	Manoj Pande, PVSM, AVSM, VSM, ADC	General; Manoj Pande, PVSM, AVSM, VSM, ADC (born 1962)	30 April 2022	30 June 2024	2 years, 61 days	Bombay Sappers
29	Upendra Dwivedi, PVSM, AVSM	General; Upendra Dwivedi, PVSM, AVSM (born 1964)	30 June 2024	30 June 2026	2 years, 0 days	Jammu and Kashmir Rifles
30	Dhiraj Seth, PVSM, UYSM, AVSM	General; Dhiraj Seth, PVSM, UYSM, AVSM (born 1966)	30 June 2026	Incumbent	124 days	2nd Lancers (Gardner's Horse)

== See also ==
=== Former command offices ===
- Commander-in-Chief, India
- Chief of the General Staff

=== Other offices of the Indian Armed Forces ===
- Chief of Defence Staff
- Chairman of the Chiefs of Staff Committee
- Chief of Integrated Defence Staff
- Chief of the Naval Staff
- Chief of the Air Staff

=== History ===
- Field Marshal of the Indian Army
- List of Indian Army Chiefs Since 1947: A Historical Overview

== Sources ==
- Khanduri, Chandra B. (2006). Thimayya: an amazing life. New Delhi: Knowledge World. p. 394. ISBN 978-81-87966-36-4.
- Singh, V. K. (2005). Leadership in the Indian army: biographies of twelve soldiers. SAGE Publications. ISBN 978-0761933229.
