= Fali Homi Major =

21st Chief of the Air Staff of the Indian Air Force

Air Chief Marshal F H Major PVSM, AVSM, SC, VM, ADC
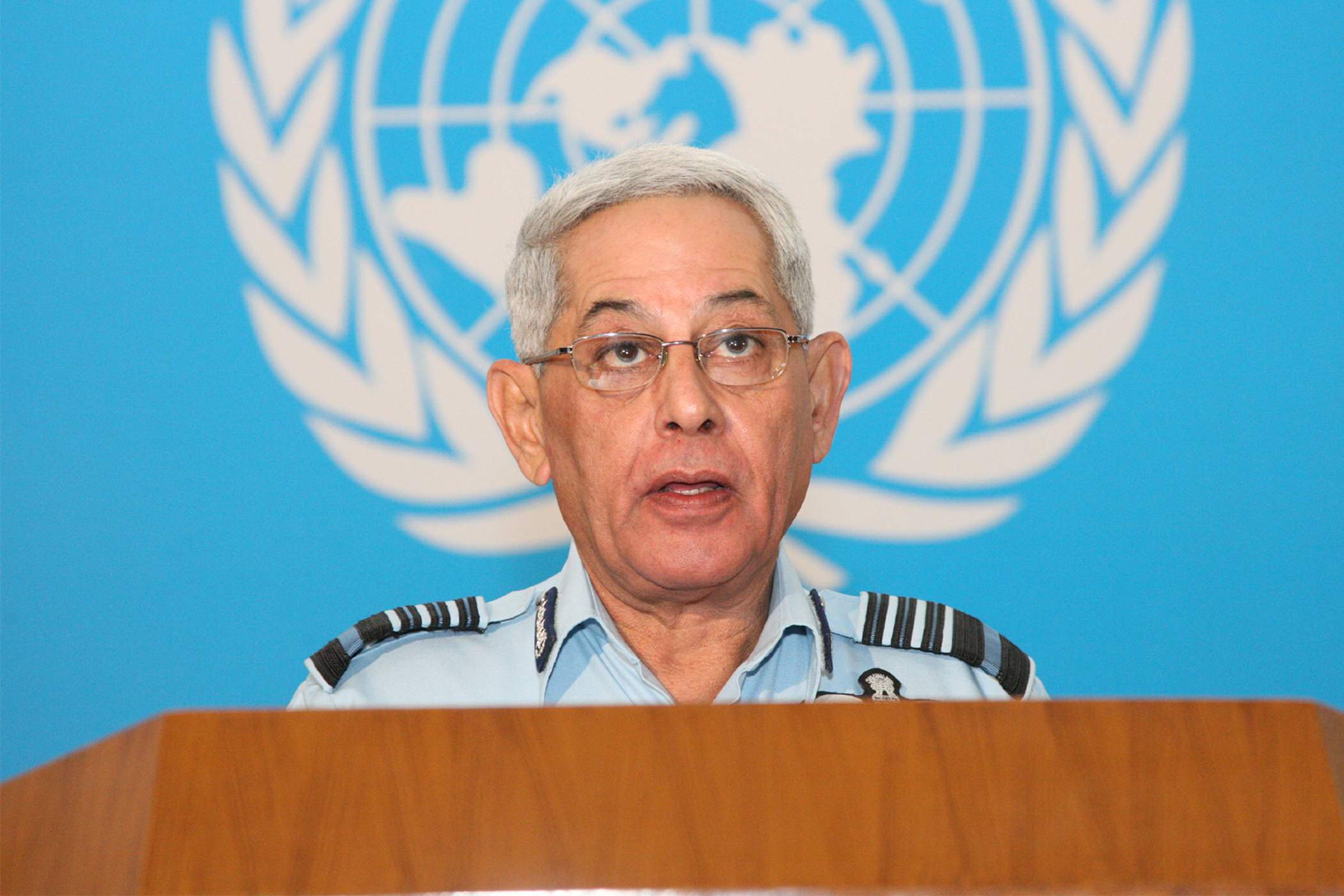

21st Chief of the Air Staff
- In office 31 March 2007 – 31 May 2009
- President: A. P. J. Abdul Kalam; Pratibha Patil
- Preceded by: Shashindra Pal Tyagi
- Succeeded by: Pradeep Vasant Naik

26th Air Officer Commanding-in-Chief, Eastern Air Command
- In office 5 September 2005 – 31 March 2007
- President: A. P. J. Abdul Kalam
- Preceded by: Avinash Deodata Joshi
- Succeeded by: Pranab Kumar Barbora

Personal details
- Born: 29 May 1947 (age 79) Secunderabad, Hyderabad State, British Raj
- Spouse: Mrs. Zareen Major
- Children: 2

Military service
- Allegiance: India
- Branch/service: Indian Air Force
- Years of service: 31 December 1967 – 31 May 2009
- Rank: Air Chief Marshal
- Commands: Eastern Air Command; AFS Sarsawa; 129 HU; 127 HU; 12 TAC; 30 WG; 4 AFSB; 21 WG
- Battles/wars: Siachen conflict Operation Pawan; Kargil War
- Awards: Param Vishisht Seva Medal; Ati Vishist Seva Medal; Shaurya Chakra; Vayu Sena Medal
- Later work(s): Member, National Security Advisory Board; Independent Director, Air India; Independent Director, Reliance Defence & Engineering Limited

Air Chief Marshal Fali Homi Major, PVSM, AVSM, SC, VM, ADC served as the 21st Chief of the Air Staff of the Indian Air Force, taking office on 1 April 2007, and becoming the first helicopter pilot in the service to be promoted to the office of Chief. He retired on 31 May 2009, and was succeeded in office by Air Chief Marshal P V Naik.

== Air Force Career ==
Major was commissioned into the Indian Air Force on 31 December 1967 as a helicopter pilot. During his long and distinguished service spanning little over 39 years, he worked in a variety of Command, Staff and Instructional appointments. Besides being a Fellow of the National Defence College, New Delhi, and the Army War College, Mhow, he attended a variety of courses like Junior Commanders' Course, Jungle and Snow Survival Course and Higher Command Courses. He was appointed Joint Director (Helicopter Operations) and Director Operations (Transport & Helicopter). In 1999, Major took over as the Air Officer Commanding Leh (Ladakh), in the aftermath of the Kargil conflict.

== Credits and awards ==
Major has the distinction of having 7,765 hours flying experience and is the most decorated Indian Air Force officer. For his leadership, successful accomplishment of tasks and distinguished service of a very high order, he was awarded the ‘Ati Vishist Seva Medal’ in Jan 2002. Major was promoted to the rank of Air Vice Marshal in Feb 2002 and appointed as Assistant Chief of the Air Staff (Personnel Airmen & Civilians) at Air Headquarters. On promotion to the rank of Air Marshal in Jan 2004 Major moved to HQ Integrated Defence Staff as the Deputy Chief of Integrated Defence Staff (Operations) and directed the relief, rescue and rehabilitation operations of the Indian Armed Forces, in India and abroad, in the aftermath of the Tsunami. On 5 September 2005, he was appointed as the Air Officer Commanding-in-Chief, Eastern Air Command. That tenure saw the successful conduct of three major international air exercises with the United States Air Force, Republic of Singapore Air Force and the French Air Force. Major was awarded the ‘Param Vishisht Seva Medal’ by the President of India on 26 Jan 2006.

Major commanded a helicopter unit, which took part in operations in Siachen, the world's highest battlefield and commanded a Mi-17 squadron during the IPKF operations in Sri Lanka, for which he was decorated with the Vayu Sena Medal (Gallantry).

While serving as a Group Captain, Major was awarded Shaurya Chakra for undertaking a very dangerous and exacting rescue mission on 14 October 1992 at Timber Trail in Parwanoo, Himachal Pradesh, where he along with his crew, winched eleven stranded tourists out from a cable car, by hovering precariously close to the set of cables that ran above it.

	Param Vishisht Seva Medal	Ati Vishisht Seva Medal	
Shaurya Chakra	Vayu Sena Medal	General Service Medal	Samanya Seva Medal
Poorvi Star	Paschimi Star	Siachen Glacier Medal	Operation Vijay Star
Special Service Medal	Sangram Medal	Operation Vijay Medal	Operation Parakram Medal
Sainya Seva Medal	High Altitude Medal	Videsh Seva Medal	50th Anniversary Independence Medal
25th Anniversary Independence Medal	30 Years Long Service Medal	20 Years Long Service Medal	9 Years Long Service Medal

== Career after the Air Force ==
Major served as an Independent Director of Air India. He was also a member of the National Security Advisory Board to the Government of India. Major has served as an Independent Director at Reliance Defence and Engineering Limited since 2016.

Following his retirement from active service, Major has remained an influential voice on defense matters. On the induction of the Rafale fighter jets into the Indian Air Force, he highlighted their superiority over China’s J-20 aircraft, stating that “there is no comparison between Rafale and the J-20s.” He noted that the Rafales would provide India with enhanced air dominance capability, citing their versatility, agility, and advanced weapons systems as key factors that would strengthen India’s strategic air power in the region.

== Personal life ==
Major was born on 29 May 1947 in Secunderabad, Nizam's Dominion. He is an alumnus of Wesley High School, Secunderabad. Air Chief Marshal F H Major is married to Mrs Zareen Major and has one son (Zubin Major) and one daughter (Tooshna Major). Major belongs to Parsi community and is an avid golfer and a cricket fan.

Military offices
Preceded by SP Tyagi	Chief of the Air Staff (India); 31 March 2007 – 31 May 2009	Succeeded by P V Naik
