= Padamjit Singh Ahluwalia =

Retired officer of the Indian Air Force

Air Marshal Padamjit Singh Ahluwalia PVSM, AVSM*, VM, VSM
- Military career
- Allegiance: India
- Branch: Indian Air Force
- Service years: 1968 – 2007
- Rank: Air Marshal
- Nickname: Pudding
- Service number: 11631
- Commands: Western Air Command; Southern Air Command; No. 45 Squadron; No. 1 Squadron
- Awards: Param Vishisht Seva Medal; Ati Vishisht Seva Medal (Bar); Vayu Sena Medal; Vishisht Seva Medal

Air Marshal Padamjit Singh Ahluwalia (born 1947 or 1948) also known as P. S. Ahluwalia, PVSM, AVSM*, VM, VSM, is a retired Indian Air Force officer. He served as the Commander-in-Chief of both Southern and Western Air Commands of India. He retired on 31 December 2007.

== Career ==
Ahluwalia has held numerous staff and command appointments in his nearly 4 decade-long military career. Previously, he was the commanding officer of a frontline Mirage-2000 Squadron. Later, he served as the Air Officer Commanding of two fighter bases. He has completed diplomatic and foreign assignments in other countries along with the Inter-Service assignment. Ahluwalia was also appointed as the Director General (Inspection & Safety) at Air Headquarters.

== Other posts ==
After retirement, he stood for the presidency of Delhi Gymkhana Club. The presidency turned into a big fight between different military forces of Indian Armed Forces with Ahluwalia representing the Indian Air Force. He also got the backing of senior most officer of the IAF, Marshal Arjan Singh.

Ahluwalia emerged as the winner by a margin of 213 votes through an election, and this was also termed as an Indian Air Force win.

== Awards and Decorations ==

| | Param Vishisht Seva Medal | Ati Vishisht Seva Medal | |
| Vayu Sena Medal | Vishisht Seva Medal | General Service Medal | Samanya Seva Medal |
| Special Service Medal | Poorvi Star | Paschimi Star | Operation Vijay Star |
| Siachen Glacier Medal | Sangram Medal | Operation Vijay Medal | Operation Parakram Medal |
| Sainya Seva Medal | High Altitude Medal | Videsh Seva Medal | 50th Independence Anniversary Medal |
| 25th Independence Anniversary Medal | 30 Years Long Service Medal | 20 Years Long Service Medal | 9 Years Long Service Medal |
