= Sunith Francis Rodrigues =

Indian army officer (1933–2022)

General Sunith Francis Rodrigues PVSM, VSM
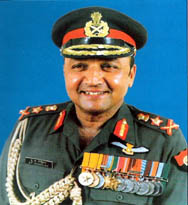

26th Governor of Punjab and 13th Administrator of Chandigarh
- In office 16 November 2004 – 22 January 2010
- Appointed by: President of India (then, A. P. J. Abdul Kalam)
- Chief Minister: Parkash Singh Badal
- Preceded by: Akhlaqur Rahman Kidwai (additional charge); Om Prakash Verma
- Succeeded by: Shivraj Patil

32nd Chairman of the Chiefs of Staff Committee
- In office 1 August 1991 – 30 June 1993
- President: R. Venkataraman; Shankar Dayal Sharma
- Prime Minister: P. V. Narasimha Rao
- Preceded by: Surinder Mehra
- Succeeded by: Laxminarayan Ramdas

15th Chief of the Army Staff
- In office 1 July 1990 – 30 June 1993
- President: R. Venkataraman; Shankar Dayal Sharma
- Prime Minister: V. P. Singh; Chandra Shekhar; P. V. Narasimha Rao
- Preceded by: Vishwa Nath Sharma
- Succeeded by: Bipin Chandra Joshi

Personal details
- Born: 19 September 1933 Bombay, British India
- Died: 4 March 2022 (aged 88) Panaji, Goa, India
- Military career
- Allegiance: India
- Branch: Indian Army
- Service years: 1952–1993
- Rank: General
- Service number: IC-6119
- Unit: Regiment of Artillery
- Commands: Western Army; Central Army
- Conflicts: Sino-Indian War of 1962; Indo-Pakistani war of 1965; Indo-Pakistani war of 1971
- Awards: Param Vishisht Seva Medal; Vishisht Seva Medal
- Other work: NSAB; Director of International Centre, Goa

General Sunith Francis Rodrigues, PVSM, VSM (19 September 1933 – 4 March 2022) was an Indian army officer who was Chief of the Army Staff of the Indian Army from 1990 to 1993 and Governor of Punjab from 2004 to 2010.

== Early life and education ==
Rodrigues was born in Bombay on 19 September 1933 to Francisco and Aida. He was educated at St. Xavier's High School, Fort in Bombay.

== Military service ==
Rodrigues joined the Joint Services Wing of the Indian Military Academy in 1949 and was commissioned on 28 December 1952 into the Regiment of Artillery. After serving in several field and self-propelled artillery units he applied for pilot training in the air observation post of the Artillery in 1964 and qualified as an artillery aviation pilot. Between 1964 and 1969, he logged more than 158 flying hours on observation aircraft and helicopters, including 65 hours of combat flying during the 1965 war in which his unit logged on more than 56 precision artillery fire to effect on enemy formations.

He attended the Defence Services Staff College and took over as GSO II operations in XXXIII Corps HQ in 1971. In 1972, after the war with Pakistan, he was awarded the VSM for distinguished service. He later served as a GSO I operations of a division from 1973 to 1975.

As a Brigadier, he commanded a mountain infantry brigade in a high altitude sector from 1975 to 1977. Post this, Rodrigues attended the 1978 course at Royal College of Defence Studies in the United Kingdom. He was Chief Instructor at Defence Services Staff College from 1979 to November 1981.

=== General officer ===
Rodrigues was then promoted to the rank of Major General and then took over the command of a division in a high altitude area. In 1982, he was awarded the master's degree in Defence Studies. He then served as the Chief of Staff of a Corps from 1983 to September 1985 after which he took over as Director General Military Training (DGMT).

After promotion to the rank of Lieutenant General, Rodrigues took command of a corps in the Northern Sector in 1986.

He was Vice Chief of Army Staff from November 1987 to April 1989 and then General Officer Commanding-in-Chief of Central Command from April 1989 to October 1989. He then took over Western Command from 1 November 1989 to 30 June 1990 and was the Chief of Army Staff from 1990 to 1993. He retired on 30 June 1993 after nearly 41 years of service.

== Public service ==
After his retirement Rodrigues was Director of the International Centre, Goa for nearly six years. He served two terms on the National Security Advisory Board. Since his retirement, he has been engaged in social and literary pursuits and has also delivered talks on strategic issues. He takes a keen interest in education and empowering children to achieve their potential. He was on the Executive Council of Goa University for seven years and on the Managing Committee of the Goa Chamber of Commerce. He is also a long-standing Member of the Goa Planning Board and on the Board of Governors of the Goa Institute of Management.

=== Governor of Punjab ===
Rodrigues was appointed Governor of Punjab and Administrator of the Union Territory of Chandigarh on 8 November 2004, and he was sworn into office on 16 November 2004.

He was succeeded by Shivraj Patil on 22 January 2010.

== Death ==
Rodrigues died at the Manipal Hospital in Dona Paula on 4 March 2022, at the age of 88.

== Military awards and decorations ==

Param Vishisht Seva Medal		Vishisht Seva Medal	
General Service Medal 1947	Samar Seva Star	Poorvi Star	Paschimi Star
Raksha Medal	Sangram Medal	Sainya Seva Medal	High Altitude Service Medal
25th Anniversary of Independence Medal	30 Years Long Service Medal	20 Years Long Service Medal	9 Years Long Service Medal

== Dates of rank ==
Insignia	Rank	Component	Date of rank
	Second Lieutenant	Indian Army	28 December 1952
	Lieutenant	Indian Army	28 December 1954
	Captain	Indian Army	28 December 1958
	Major	Indian Army	28 December 1965
	Lieutenant-Colonel	Indian Army	17 June 1973
	Colonel	Indian Army	1975
	Brigadier	Indian Army	2 September 1976
	Major General	Indian Army	8 April 1983
	Lieutenant-General	Indian Army	20 September 1985
	General (COAS)	Indian Army	30 June 1990

Military offices
Preceded by Surinder Mehra	Chairman of the Chiefs of Staff Committee; 1 August 1991 – 30 June 1993	Succeeded by Laxminarayan Ramdas
Preceded by Vishwa Nath Sharma	Chief of Army Staff; 1990–1993	Succeeded by Bipin Chandra Joshi
Preceded by J K Puri	Vice Chief of Army Staff; 1 November 1987 – 20 April 1989	Succeeded by V K Sood
Preceded by V K Nayak	General Officer Commanding-in-Chief Western Command; 1 November 1989 – 30 June 1990	Succeeded by G S Grewal
Preceded by Sami Khan	General Officer Commanding-in-Chief Central Command; 1 April 1989 – 30 October 1989	Succeeded by F. N. Billimoria
Government offices
Preceded by Akhlaqur Rahman Kidwai	Governor of Punjab; 2004–2010	Succeeded by Shivraj Patil
