= Sam Manekshaw =

Indian military officer (1914–2009)

Field Marshal Sam Manekshaw MC
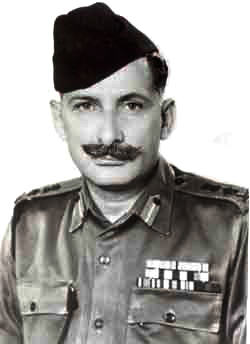
- Manekshaw, as army chief pictured in General's insignia

7th Chief of the Army Staff, India
- In office 8 June 1969 – 15 January 1973
- President: V. V. Giri; Mohammad Hidayatullah
- Prime Minister: Indira Gandhi
- Preceded by: P. P. Kumaramangalam
- Succeeded by: Gopal Gurunath Bewoor

9th General Officer Commanding-in-Chief, Eastern Command
- In office 16 November 1964 – 8 June 1969
- Preceded by: P. P. Kumaramangalam
- Succeeded by: Jagjit Singh Aurora

9th General Officer Commanding-in-Chief, Western Command
- In office 4 December 1963 – 15 November 1964
- Preceded by: Daulet Singh
- Succeeded by: Harbaksh Singh

2nd General Officer Commanding, IV Corps
- In office 2 December 1962 – 4 December 1963
- Preceded by: Brij Mohan Kaul
- Succeeded by: Manmohan Khanna

Personal details
- Born: Sam Homusji Framji Jamshedji Manekshaw; 3 April 1914 Amritsar, Punjab Province, British India (present day Punjab, India)
- Died: 27 June 2008 (aged 94) Wellington, Tamil Nadu, India
- Resting place: Parsi Zoroastrian Cemetery, Ooty, Tamil Nadu, India
- Spouse: Silloo Bode
- Education: Indian Military Academy
- Awards: Padma Vibhushan; Padma Bhushan; Military Cross; Order of Tri Shakti Patta First Class
- Nickname: "Sam Bahadur"

Military service
- Allegiance: British India; India
- Branch/service: British Indian Army; Indian Army
- Years of service: 1934 – 2008 (Note: Manekshaw retired from active service in 1973, however, like U.S. officers, Indian military five-star rank officers hold their rank for life, and are considered to be serving officers until their deaths.)
- Rank: Field Marshal
- Unit: 12th Frontier Force Regiment; 8th Gorkha Rifles
- Commands: Eastern Army; Western Army; IV Corps; 26th Infantry Division; Defence Services Staff College, Wellington; The Infantry School; 167 Infantry Brigade
- Battles/wars: World War II; Burma campaign; Indo-Pakistan War of 1947; Indo-Pakistan War of 1965; Second Sino-Indian War; Indo-Pakistani war of 1971; Bangladesh Liberation War; Rebellion and insurgency in Mizoram
- Service number: IC-14

Field Marshal Sam Hormusji Framji Jamshedji Manekshaw, MC (3 April 1914 – 27 June 2008), nicknamed as Sam Bahadur ("the Brave"), was an Indian Army general officer who was the Chief of the army staff during the India–Pakistan war of 1971, and the first Indian army officer to be promoted to the rank of field marshal. His active military career spanned four decades, beginning with service in World War II.

Manekshaw joined the first intake of the Indian Military Academy at Dehradun in 1932. He was commissioned into the 4th Battalion, 12th Frontier Force Regiment. In World War II, he was awarded the Military Cross for gallantry. Following the Partition of India in 1947, he was reassigned to the 8th Gorkha Rifles. Manekshaw was seconded to a planning role during the 1947 Indo-Pakistani War and the Hyderabad crisis, and as a result, he never commanded an infantry battalion. He was promoted to the rank of brigadier while serving at the Military Operations Directorate. He became the commander of 167 Infantry Brigade in 1952 and served in this position until 1954 when he took over as the director of military training at the Army Headquarters.

After completing the higher command course at the Imperial Defence College, he was appointed the general officer commanding of the 26th Infantry Division. He also served as the commandant of the Defence Services Staff College. In 1962, he was accused in a politically motivated treason trial, and therefore could not serve in the 1962 war; he was eventually found innocent. In 1963, Manekshaw was promoted to the rank of army commander and took over Western Command, then was transferred in 1964 to Eastern Command. In 1967 in this role, he was involved in the first Indian victory against a Chinese offensive during the Nathu La and Cho La clashes.

Manekshaw was awarded the Padma Bhushan, the third highest Indian civilian award, in 1968 for responding to the insurgencies in Nagaland and Mizoram. Manekshaw became the seventh chief of army staff in 1969. Under his command, Indian forces were provided arms and ammunitions to fight against the strong regular army of Pakistan in the India-Pakistan War of 1971, which led to the separation of Bangladesh in December 1971. He was awarded the Padma Vibhushan, the second highest civilian award of India, in 1972 for his services to the nation. Manekshaw was promoted to the rank of field marshal in January 1973, the first of the only two Indian officers to be ever promoted to the post (the second being K.M. Cariappa in 1986). He retired on 15 January 1973 (Army Day) at the age of 58.

== Early life and family ==
Sam Manekshaw was born on 3 April 1914 in Amritsar to Hormizd (Note: Hormizd was his Iranian name; for communicating with Indians and Britishers he used the name Hormusji.) (1871–1964), a doctor, and Hilla, née Mehta (1885–1970). Both of his parents were Parsis who had moved to Amritsar from the city of Valsad in coastal Gujarat. Manekshaw's parents had left Mumbai in 1903 for Lahore, where his father was going to start practising medicine. However, when their train halted at Amritsar station, Hilla found it impossible to travel any further due to her advanced pregnancy. After Hilla had recovered from child birth, the couple decided to stay in Amritsar, where Hormizd soon set up a clinic and pharmacy. The couple had four sons (Fali, Jan, Sam and Jami) and two daughters (Cilla and Sheru). Manekshaw was their fifth child and third son.

During World War I, Hormizd had served in the British Indian Army as a captain in the Indian Medical Service (now the Army Medical Corps).

== Education ==
Manekshaw completed his primary schooling in Punjab, and then joined Sherwood College, Nainital for 8 years. In 1931, he passed his senior high school examinations with distinction. He then asked his father to send him to London to study medicine, but his father refused as he was not old enough. His father was already supporting Sam's elder brothers who were studying engineering in London. Manekshaw instead enrolled at the Hindu Sabha College (now the Hindu College, Amritsar) and graduated in April 1932.

A formal notification for the entrance examination to enrol in the newly established Indian Military Academy (IMA) was issued in the early months of 1932. Examinations were scheduled for June or July. In an act of rebellion against his father's refusal to send him to London, Manekshaw applied for a place and sat for the entrance exams in Delhi. On 1 October 1932, he was one of the fifteen cadets to be selected through an open competition, (Note: There were 40 vacancies, of which 15 were filled through an open competition, 15 from the ranks of the army and the remaining 10 from the princely state forces.) and placed sixth in the order of merit.

=== Indian Military Academy ===
Manekshaw was part of the first batch of cadets at the IMA. Called "The Pioneers", this batch also included Smith Dun and Muhammad Musa Khan, the future commanders-in-chief of Burma and Pakistan, respectively. Although the academy was inaugurated on 10 December 1932, the cadets' military training commenced on 1 October 1932. As an IMA cadet, Manekshaw went on to achieve a number of distinctions: the only one to attain the rank of field marshal. The commandant of the Academy during this period was Brigadier Lionel Peter Collins. Manekshaw was almost suspended from the Academy when he went to Mussoorie for a holiday with Kumar Jit Singh (the Maharaja of Kapurthala) and Haji Iftikhar Ahmed, and did not return in time for the morning drills.

Of the 40 cadets inducted into the IMA, only 22 completed the course; they were commissioned as second lieutenants on 1 February 1935. Some of his batchmates were Dewan Ranjit Rai; Mohan Singh, the founder of the Indian National Army; Melville de Mellow, a famous radio presenter; and two generals of the Pakistani Army, Mirza Hamid Hussain and Habibullah Khan Khattak. Many of Manekshaw's batchmates were captured by Japan during World War II and would fight in the Indian National Army, which mostly drew its troops from Indian prisoners of war in Axis camps. Tikka Khan, who would later join the Pakistani Army during the Partition, was Manekshaw's junior at the IMA by five years and also his boxing partner.

== Military career ==
When Manekshaw was commissioned, it was standard practice for newly commissioned Indian officers to be initially assigned to a British regiment before being sent to an Indian unit. Manekshaw thus joined the 2nd Battalion, Royal Scots, stationed at Lahore. He was later posted to the 4th Battalion, 6th Frontier Force Regiment (4/6 FF), stationed in Burma. On 1 May 1938, he was appointed quartermaster of his company. Already fluent in Punjabi, Hindi, Urdu, English and his native language Gujarati, in October 1938 Manekshaw qualified as a Higher Standard army interpreter in Pashto.

=== World War II ===
There was a shortage of qualified officers at the outbreak of the war, officers were thus promoted without having served for the minimum period required for a promotion. Therefore, for the first two years of the conflict, Manekshaw was temporarily appointed to the ranks of captain and major before being promoted to the substantive rank of captain on 4 February 1942.

==== Battle of Pagoda Hill ====
Manekshaw saw action in Burma during the 1942 campaign at the Sittang River with 4/12 FF, and was recognised for his bravery in the battle. During the fighting around Pagoda Hill, a key position on the left of the Sittang bridgehead, he led his company in a counter-attack against the invading Imperial Japanese Army. Despite suffering 30% casualties, the company managed to achieve its objective, partly because of the aid received from Captain John Niel Randle's company. After capturing the hill, Manekshaw was hit by a burst of light machine gun fire, and was severely wounded in the stomach. While observing the battle, Major General David Tennant Cowan, General Officer Commanding of the 17th Infantry Division, spotted the wounded Manekshaw and awarded him the Military Cross. This award was made official with the publication of the notification in a supplement to the London Gazette. The citation reads:

This officer was in command of the 'A' Company of his battalion when ordered to counter-attack the Pagoda Hill position, the key hill on the left of the Sittang Bridgehead, which had been captured by the enemy. The counterattack was successful despite 30% casualties, and this was largely due to the excellent leadership and bearing of Captain Manekshaw. This officer was wounded after the position had been captured.

Manekshaw was evacuated from the battlefield by Sher Singh, his orderly, who took him to an Australian surgeon. The surgeon initially declined to treat Manekshaw, saying that he had been too badly wounded. Manekshaw's chances of survival were low, but Sher Singh persuaded the doctor to treat him. Manekshaw regained consciousness, and when the surgeon asked what had happened to him, he replied that he had been "kicked by a mule". Impressed by Manekshaw's sense of humour, the surgeon treated him, removing the bullets from his lungs, liver, and kidneys. Most of his intestines were also removed, Manekshaw survived and recovered from his wounds.

Manekshaw attended the eighth staff course at the Command and Staff College in Quetta between 23 August and 22 December 1943. On completion, he was posted as the brigade major of the Razmak Brigade. He served in that post until 22 October 1944, after which he joined the 9th Battalion, 12th Frontier Force Regiment, part of the 14th Army commanded by General William Slim. On 30 October 1944, he received the temporary rank of lieutenant colonel. By the end of the war, he was appointed as a staff officer to the general officer commanding of the 20th Indian Infantry Division, Major General Douglas Gracey. During the Japanese surrender, Manekshaw was appointed to supervise the disarmament of over 10,000 Japanese prisoners of war (POWs). No cases of indiscipline or escape attempts were reported from the camp Manekshaw was in charge of. He was promoted to the acting rank of lieutenant colonel on 5 May 1946, and completed a six-month lecture tour of Australia. From 1945 to 1946, Manekshaw and Yahya Khan were two of the staff officers of Field Marshal Sir Claude Auchinleck. Manekshaw was promoted to the substantive rank of major on 4 February 1947, and on his return from Australia was appointed a Grade 1 General Staff Officer (GSO1) in the Military Operations (MO) Directorate.

=== Post-independence ===
Due to the Partition of India in 1947, Manekshaw's unit, the 4th Battalion, 12th Frontier Force Regiment, became part of the Pakistan army. Manekshaw was therefore reassigned to the 8th Gorkha Rifles. Muhammad Ali Jinnah, Pakistan's first Governor General, also considered the founder of that nation, had reportedly asked Manekshaw to join the Pakistani Army, but Manekshaw had refused.

In October 1947, Manekshaw was posted as the commanding officer of the 3rd Battalion, 5 Gorkha Rifles (Frontier Force) (3/5 GR (FF)). Before he had moved on to his new appointment, on 22 October, Pakistani forces infiltrated the Kashmir region, capturing Domel and Muzaffarabad. The following day, the ruler of the princely state of Jammu and Kashmir, Maharaja Hari Singh, appealed to India for help. On 25 October, Manekshaw accompanied V. P. Menon to Srinagar, where he carried out an aerial survey of the situation in Kashmir. On the same day, they flew back to Delhi, where Lord Mountbatten and Prime Minister Jawaharlal Nehru were briefed. On the morning of 27 October, Indian troops were sent to Kashmir to defend Srinagar from the Pakistani forces, who had reached the city's outskirts. Manekshaw's assignment as the commander of 3/5 GR (FF) was cancelled, and he was posted to the MO Directorate. As a consequence of the Kashmir dispute and the annexation of Hyderabad (whose events he briefed Sardar Patel on), Manekshaw never commanded a battalion. During his term at the MO Directorate, he was promoted to colonel, then brigadier. He was then appointed the Director of Military Operations (DMO).

Manekshaw was one of the three army officers who represented India at the 1949 Karachi Conference. The Conference resulted in the Karachi Agreement and the Ceasefire Line (which evolved into the Line of Control). The other two army officers at the conference were Lt. Gen. S. M. Shrinagesh and Maj. Gen. KS Thimayya, while the two civilian officers were Vishnu Sahay and HM Patel.

Manekshaw was promoted to the substantive rank of colonel on 4 February 1952, (Note: In the decade after Independence, due to shortages of qualified officers in the senior ranks, it was common for officers to be promoted before they had completed the usual requisite years of service to advance in rank. Manekshaw received a further 4 year extension in his substantive rank of colonel in 1956 as a result.) and in April was appointed the commander of 167 Infantry Brigade, headquartered at Firozpur. On 9 April 1954, he was appointed the director of military training at Army Headquarters. He was appointed the commandant of the Infantry School at Mhow on 14 January 1955, and also became the colonel of both the 8th Gorkha Rifles and the 61st Cavalry. During his tenure as the commandant of the Infantry School, he discovered that the training manuals were outdated, and was instrumental in revamping them to be consistent with the tactics employed by the Indian Army. He was promoted to the substantive rank of brigadier on 4 February 1957.

=== General officer ===
In 1957, he went to the Imperial Defence College, London, to attend a year long higher command course. On his return, he was appointed the general officer commanding (GOC) 26th Infantry Division on 20 December 1957, with the acting rank of major general. When he commanded the division, Gen. K. S. Thimayya was the chief of the army staff (COAS), and Krishna Menon the defence minister. During a visit to Manekshaw's division, Menon asked him what he thought of Thimayya. Manekshaw replied that it was improper to evaluate his superior, and told Menon not to ask anybody again. This annoyed Menon, and he told Manekshaw that if he wanted to, he could sack Thimayya, to which Manekshaw replied, "You can get rid of him. But then I will get another."

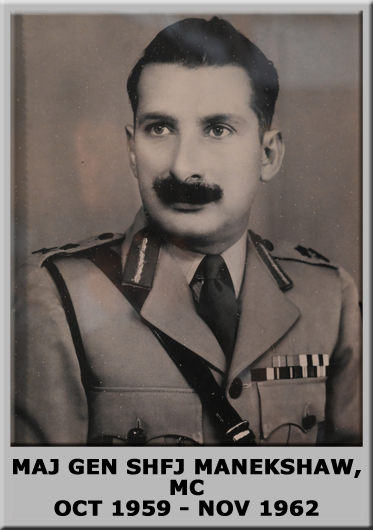
Manekshaw as the Commandant of the Defence Services Staff College

Manekshaw was promoted to substantive major general on 1 March 1959. On 1 October, he was appointed the Commandant of the Defence Services Staff College, Wellington, where he was caught up in a controversy that almost ended his career. In May 1961, Thimayya resigned as the COAS, and was succeeded by General Pran Nath Thapar. Earlier in the year, Major General Brij Mohan Kaul had been promoted to lieutenant general and appointed the Quarter Master General by Menon. The appointment was made against the recommendation of Thimayya, who resigned as a result. Kaul was made the chief of general staff (CGS), the second highest appointment at Army Headquarters after the COAS. Kaul cultivated a close relationship with Nehru and Menon and became even more powerful than the COAS. This was met with disapproval by senior army officials, including Manekshaw, who argued against the interference of the political leadership in the administration of the army. This led him to be marked as an anti-national.

Kaul sent informers to spy on Manekshaw who, as a result of the information gathered, was charged with sedition, and subjected to a court of inquiry. The charges against him were that he was more loyal to the Queen and the Crown than to India, because he had not removed portraits of the Queen and British military and civilian officers from the College and his office. The court, presided over by the general officer commanding-in-chief (GOC-in-C) of Western Command, Lt. Gen. Daulet Singh, exonerated Manekshaw as no evidence against him was found. Before a formal 'no case to answer' could be announced, the Sino-Indian War broke out; Manekshaw was not able to participate because of the court proceedings. The Indian Army was defeated in the war, for which Kaul and Menon were held primarily responsible, both were sacked. In November 1962, Nehru asked Manekshaw to take over the command of IV Corps. Manekshaw told Nehru that the court action against him was a conspiracy, and that his promotion had been due for almost eighteen months; Nehru apologised. Shortly after, on 2 December 1962, Manekshaw was promoted to acting lieutenant general and appointed the GOC of IV Corps at Tezpur.

Soon after taking charge, Manekshaw reached the conclusion that poor leadership had been a significant factor in IV Corps' failure in the war with China. He felt the first course of action was to improve the morale of his soldiers. Manekshaw identified the root cause of the low morale to be panicked withdrawals, ordered without allowing the soldiers to fight back. He ordered there to be no more retreats without his written permission. The next task Manekshaw took up was to reorganise the troops in the North-East Frontier Agency (NEFA), where he alleviated the shortages of equipment, accommodation and clothing. Analyst Srinath Raghavan noted that Corps Commander Manekshaw and COAS Jayanto Nath Chaudhuri had delayed moving into the NEFA region until the end of 1963, in order to avoid provoking a new Chinese offensive.

Promoted to substantive lieutenant general on 20 July 1963, Manekshaw was appointed an army commander on 5 December, taking command of Western Command as the GOC-in-C. Defence analyst Ajai Shukla, citing Anit Mukherjee, states that Western Command troops were reported to be moving from Punjab to Delhi after Nehru's death. This movement was seen as the precursor to a coup by the civilian establishment, while the army said it was moving in troops to manage the large crowds expected at Nehru's funeral. As a result, on 16 November 1964, Manekshaw was transferred from Shimla to Calcutta as the GOC-in-C Eastern Command. There he responded to the insurgencies in Nagaland and Mizoram, for which he was awarded the Padma Bhushan in 1968.

=== Nathu La and Cho La clashes ===
In 1967, five years after the War of 1962, China decided to capture four critical posts in Sikkim: Nathu La, Jelep La, Sebu La and Cho La. These posts were strategically valuable, as they oversaw the Chicken's Neck, the small strip of land which provides access to Northeast India. Major General Sagat Singh decided not to retreat following the Chinese attack. Manekshaw endorsed this initiative by Singh and remarked: "I am afraid they are enacting Hamlet without the Prince. I will now tell you how I intend to deal with this." The conflict ended in Indian victory following the Chinese withdrawal from the area.

=== Chief of army staff ===
Gen. P. P. Kumaramangalam retired as the chief of army staff (COAS) in June 1969. Manekshaw was appointed as the eighth chief of the army staff on 8 June 1969. During his tenure, he was instrumental in stopping a plan to reserve quotas in the army for Scheduled Castes and Scheduled Tribes. Though he was a Parsi, a minority in India, Manekshaw felt reservation would compromise the ethos of the army and believed all must be given an equal chance.

In his capacity as the COAS, Manekshaw once visited a battalion of the 8 Gorkha Rifles in July 1969. He asked an orderly if he knew the name of his chief. The orderly replied that he did, and on being asked to name the chief, he said "Sam Bahadur" (lit. 'Sam the Brave'). (Note: Bahadur was an honorific title bestowed upon princes and victorious military commanders by Mughal emperors, and later by their British successors.) This eventually became Manekshaw's nickname. During this period, there were suspicions that Manekshaw would lead a coup and impose martial law. Indira Gandhi had asked him if he intended to coup, Manekshaw had denied. Once, an American diplomat, in the presence of Kenneth Keating, the US ambassador to India, had asked Manekshaw when he was going to stage a coup. Manekshaw reportedly said, "As soon as General Westmoreland takes over your country".

==== Bangladesh Liberation War 1971 ====
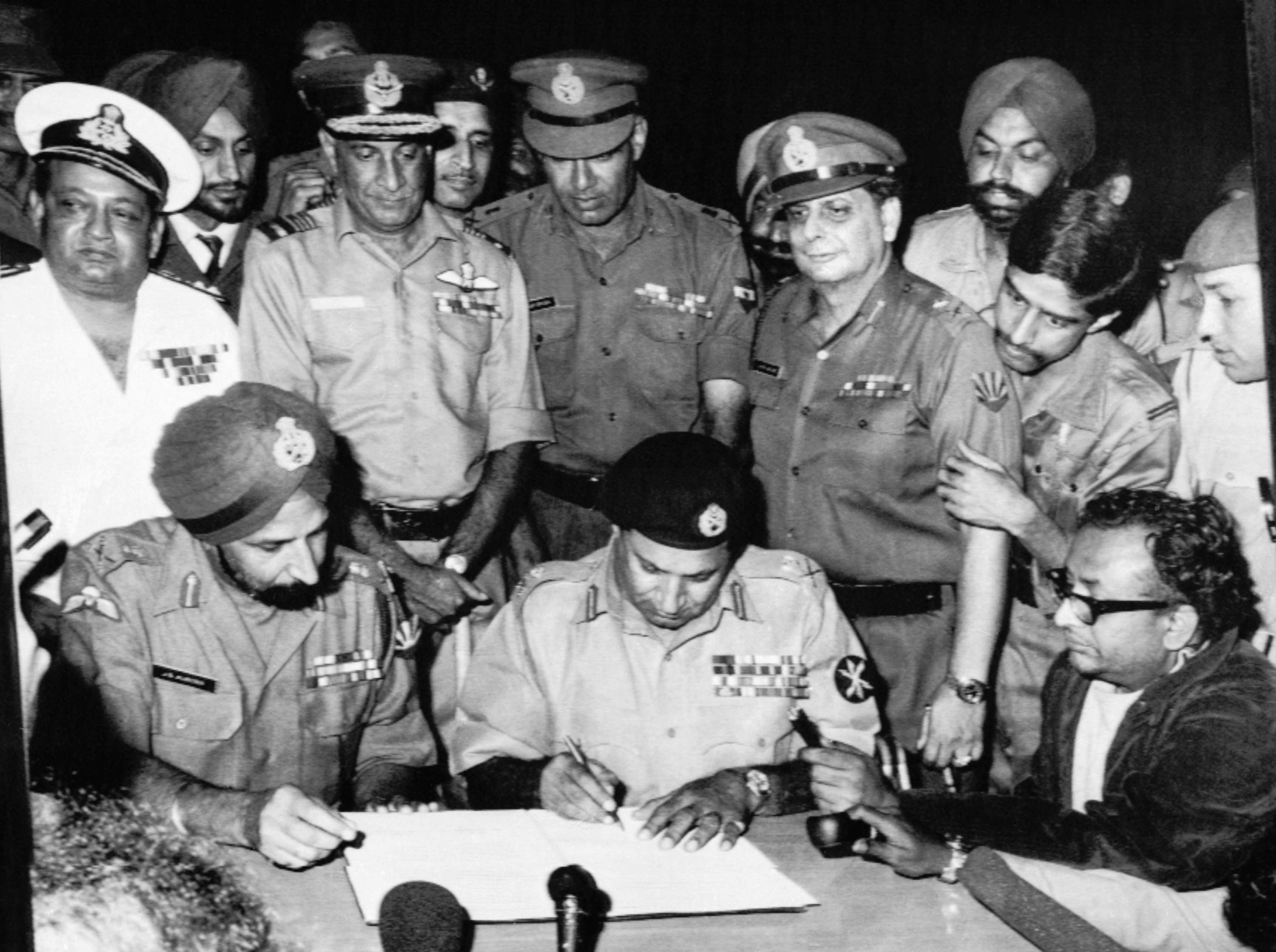
The instrument of surrender being signed on 16 December 1971 (the signatory generals were Jagjit Singh Aurora and Amir Abdullah Khan Niazi from the Indian and Pakistani sides respectively)

The Indo-Pakistani War of 1971 was sparked by the Bangladesh Liberation war, a conflict between the traditionally dominant West Pakistanis and the East Pakistanis who were a majority of the population but lacked representation. In 1970, East Pakistanis called for Bengali autonomy, but the Pakistani government failed to meet these demands. In early 1971, opinion shifted towards secession in East Pakistan. In March, the Pakistan Armed Forces launched a fierce campaign to curb the secessionists, whose members included soldiers and police from East Pakistan. Thousands of East Pakistanis died, and nearly ten million refugees fled to West Bengal, an adjacent Indian state. In April, India decided to intervene militarily to create Bangladesh.

During a cabinet meeting towards the end of April, Prime Minister Indira Gandhi asked Manekshaw if he was prepared to go to war with Pakistan. He replied that most of his armoured and infantry divisions were deployed elsewhere, only twelve of his tanks were combat-ready, and they would be competing for rail carriages with the grain harvest. He also pointed out that the Himalayan passes would soon open up with the forthcoming monsoon, which would result in heavy flooding. After the cabinet had left the room, Manekshaw offered to resign; Gandhi declined and instead sought his advice. He said he could guarantee victory if she would allow him to handle the conflict on his own terms, and set a date for its initiation; Gandhi agreed.

Following the strategy planned by Manekshaw, the army launched several preparatory operations in East Pakistan, including training and equipping the Mukti Bahini, a local militia group of Bengali nationalists. About three brigades of regular Bangladeshi troops were trained, and 75,000 guerrillas were trained and equipped with arms and ammunition. These forces were used to harass the Pakistani Army forces stationed in East Pakistan in the lead-up to the war.

The war started officially on 3 December 1971, when Pakistani aircraft bombed Indian Air Force bases in western India. The Army Headquarters under Manekshaw's leadership formulated the following strategy: II Corps commanded by Lt. Gen. Tapishwar Narain Raina would enter from the west; IV Corps commanded by Lt. Gen. Sagat Singh would enter from the east; XXXIII Corps commanded by Lt. Gen. Mohan L. Thapan would enter from the north; and the 101 Communication Zone Area commanded by Maj. Gen. Gurbax Singh would provide support from the northeast. This strategy was to be executed by Eastern Command under Lt. Gen. Jagjit Singh Aurora. Manekshaw instructed Lt. Gen. J.F.R. Jacob, chief of staff, Eastern Command, to inform the Indian prime minister that orders were being issued for the movement of troops from Eastern Command. The following day, the Indian Navy and Air Force also initiated full-scale operations on both the eastern and western fronts.

As the war progressed, India captured most of the strategic positions and isolated the Pakistani forces, who started to surrender or withdraw. The UN Security Council assembled on 4 December 1971 to discuss the situation. After lengthy discussions on 7 December, the United States put forward a resolution for an "immediate cease-fire and withdrawal of troops". While supported by the majority, the USSR vetoed it twice, and because of Pakistani atrocities in Bengal, the United Kingdom and France abstained. On 8 December, a C141 American cargo plane was seen unloading arms and other equipment at Karachi. Manekshaw prevented any further supplies by summoning the military attache at the US embassy in India and asking him to stop the drops which were in contravention of US public policy.

Indian forces have surrounded you. Your Air Force is destroyed. You have no hope of any help from them. Chittagong, Chalna and Mangla ports are blocked. Nobody can reach you from the sea. Your fate is sealed. The Mukti Bahini and the people are all prepared to take revenge for the atrocities and cruelties you have committed...Why waste lives? Don't you want to go home and be with your children? Do not lose time; there is no disgrace in laying down your arms to a soldier. We will give you the treatment befitting a soldier[.]

— Manekshaw's first radio message to the Pakistani troops on 9 December 1971

Manekshaw addressed the Pakistani troops by radio broadcast on 9, 11 and 15 December, assuring them that they would receive honourable treatment from the Indian troops if they surrendered. The last two broadcasts were delivered as replies to messages from the Pakistani commanders Maj. Gen. Rao Farman Ali and Lt. Gen. Amir Abdullah Khan Niazi to their troops. These broadcasts had a demoralising effect; they convinced the Pakistani troops of the futility of further resistance and led to their decision to surrender.

On 11 December, Ali messaged the United Nations requesting a ceasefire, but it was not authorised by President Yahya Khan, and the fighting continued. Following several discussions and consultations, and subsequent attacks by the Indian forces, Khan decided to stop the war in order to avoid any additional Pakistani casualties. The actual decision to surrender was taken by Niazi on 15 December and was conveyed to Manekshaw through the United States Consul General in Dhaka via Washington. Manekshaw replied that he would stop the war only if the Pakistani troops surrendered to their Indian counterparts by 9 AM on 16 December. The deadline was extended to 3 PM on the same day at Niazi's request, and the instrument of surrender was formally signed on 16 December 1971 by Lt. Gen. Amir Abdullah Khan Niazi.

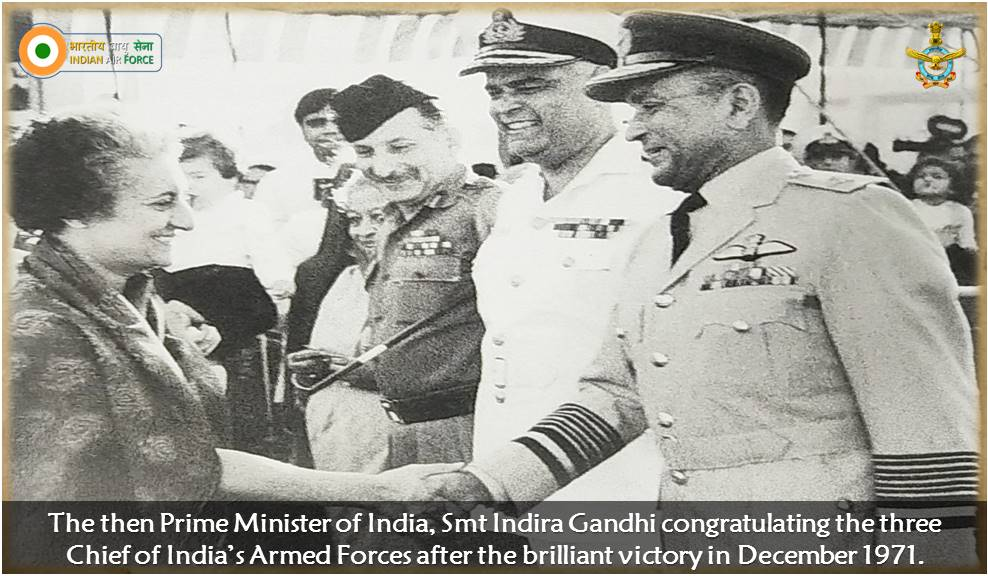
The Prime Minister of India, Indira Gandhi, congratulating the Chiefs of the three services, General Sam Manekshaw, Admiral SM Nanda and Air Chief Marshal PC Lal.

When the prime minister asked Manekshaw to go to Dhaka and accept the surrender of Pakistani forces, he declined, saying that the honour should go to the GOC-in-C Eastern Command, Lt. Gen. Jagjit Singh Aurora. Concerned about maintaining discipline in the aftermath of the conflict, Manekshaw issued strict instructions forbidding looting and rape and stressed the need to respect and stay away from women. As a result, according to Singh, cases of looting and rape were negligible. While addressing his troops on the matter, Manekshaw was quoted as saying: "When you see a Begum (Muslim woman), keep your hands in your pockets, and think of Sam."

The war lasted 12 days and saw 93,000 Pakistani soldiers taken prisoner. It ended with the unconditional surrender of East Pakistan and resulted in the creation of Bangladesh. In addition to the prisoners of war (POWs), Pakistan suffered 6,000 casualties against India's 2,000. After the war, Manekshaw ensured good conditions for the POWs, but was criticised for treating them like "sons in law" by the cabinet. Singh recounts that in some cases he addressed them personally and talked to them privately, with just his aide-de-camp for company, while they shared a cup of tea. He made provisions for the prisoners to be supplied with the copies of the Quran, and allowed them to celebrate festivals and receive letters and parcels from their loved ones. However, he did not want them to be returned to Pakistan until a peace agreement was concluded, as the POWs numbered about four divisions of soldiers and could be deployed for another war. The Pakistani POWs remained in captivity for several years, used as leverage for Pakistan officially recognizing Bangladesh.

Manekshaw was India's official representative for the negotiations held on 28 November 1972 to demarcate the Line of Control in Kashmir after the war. Pakistan's representative was General Tikka Khan. The talks broke down due to disagreements on control over parts of Thako Chak and Kaiyan (located in Pakistan's Chicken's Neck), Chhamb and Tortuk. The second round of talks held from 5 to 7 December managed to resolve these issues.

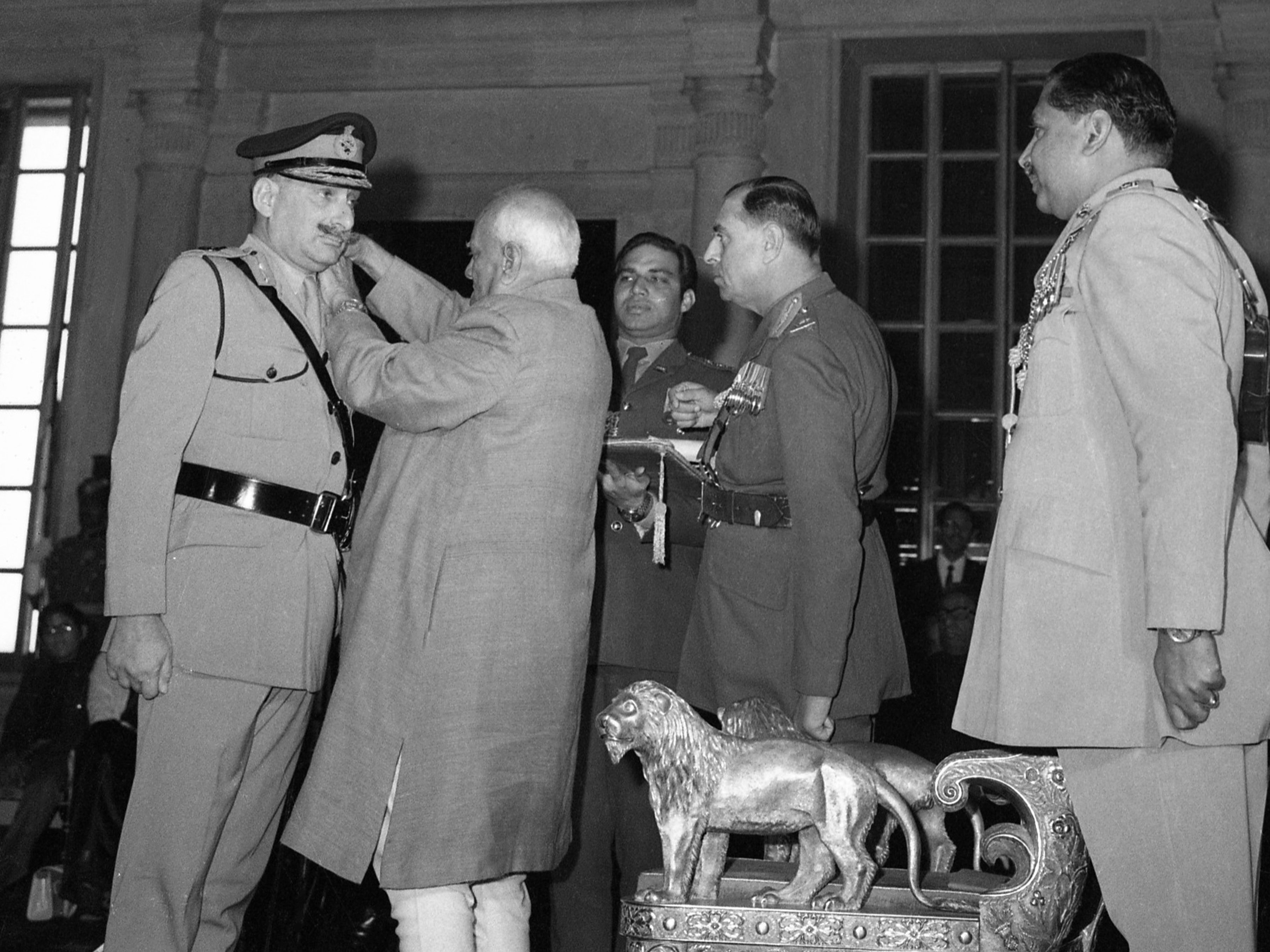
The President of India, V. V. Giri, conferring the rank of Field Marshal on COAS Sam Manekshaw at Rashtrapathi Bhavan in January 1973.

=== Promotion to field marshal ===
After the war, Indira Gandhi decided to promote Manekshaw to the rank of field marshal and appoint him as the chief of defence staff (CDS). However, after several objections from the commanders of the navy and the air force, the appointment was dropped. Because Manekshaw was from the army, there were concerns that the comparatively smaller forces of the navy and air force would be neglected. Moreover, the bureaucrats felt that the appointment might reduce their influence over defence issues. Though Manekshaw was to retire in June 1972, his term was extended by a period of six months, and "in recognition of outstanding services to the Armed Forces and the nation," he was promoted to the rank of field marshal on 1 January 1973. The first Indian Army officer to be so promoted, he was formally conferred with the rank in a ceremony held at the Rashtrapati Bhavan (President's Residence) on 3 January.

== Honours and post-retirement ==
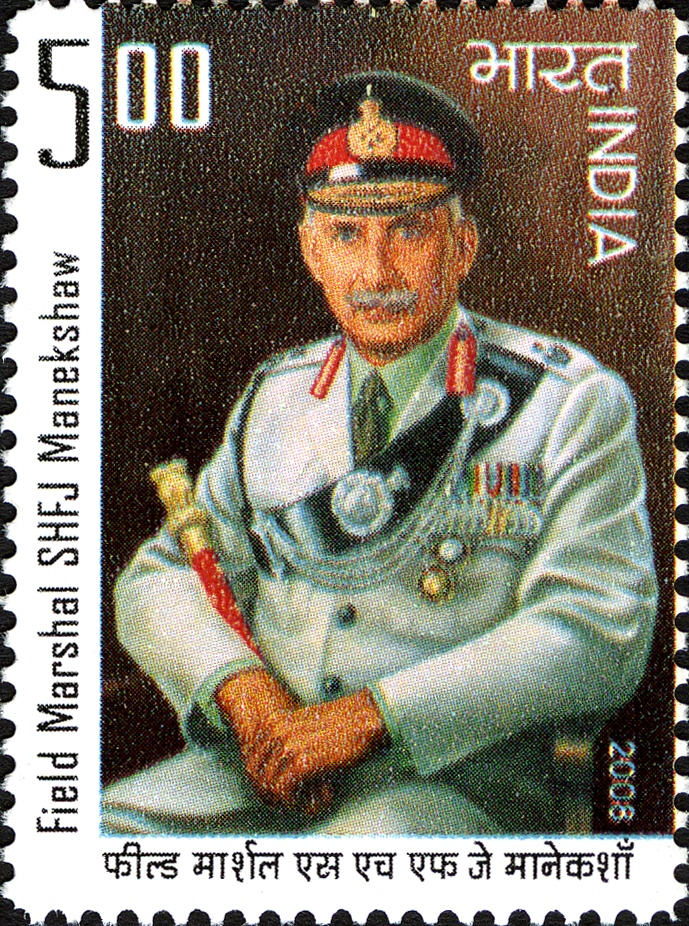
Manekshaw on a 2008 stamp of India

For his service to India, the President of India, VV Giri, awarded Manekshaw the Padma Vibhushan in 1972. Manekshaw retired from active service on 15 January 1973 (celebrated as Army Day in India) after a career of nearly four decades. He moved with his family to Coonoor, the civilian town next to Wellington Cantonment, where he had served as commandant of the Defence Services Staff College early on in his career. Popular with Gorkha soldiers, Nepal fêted Manekshaw as an honorary general of the Nepalese Army in 1972. In 1977, he was awarded the Order of Tri Shakti Patta First Class, an order of knighthood of the Kingdom of Nepal by King Birendra. Following his service in the Indian Army, Manekshaw served as an independent director on the board and, in a few cases, as the chairman of several companies, like Bombay Burmah Trading Corporation, Britannia Industries and Escorts Limited.

In May 2007, Gohar Ayub, the son of the Pakistani Field Marshal Ayub Khan, claimed that Manekshaw had sold Indian Army secrets to Pakistan during the Indo-Pakistani War of 1965 for 20,000 rupees, but his accusations were dismissed by the Indian defence establishment.

Although Manekshaw was conferred the rank of field marshal in 1973, it was reported that he was not given the complete allowances he was entitled to. He did not receive these until 2007, when President A. P. J. Abdul Kalam met him in Wellington, and presented him with a cheque for ₹1.3 crore (equivalent to ₹4.3 crore or US$460,000 in 2026)—his arrears of pay for over 30 years. Manekshaw was critical of politicians and civilian bureaucrats, and frequently mocked them, asking for example, "whether those of our political masters who have been put in charge of the defence of the country can distinguish a mortar from a motor; a gun from a howitzer; a guerrilla from a gorilla – although a great many in the past have resembled the latter.”

Manekshaw visited hospitalised soldiers during the Kargil War and was cited by COAS Ved Prakash Malik, the commander during the war, as his icon.

== Personal life and death ==
Manekshaw married Silloo Bode on 22 April 1939 in Bombay. The couple had two daughters.

Manekshaw died of complications from pneumonia at the Military Hospital in Wellington, Tamil Nadu, at 12:30 a.m. on 27 June 2008 at the age of 94. Reportedly, his last words were "I'm okay!" He was buried at the Parsi cemetery in Udhagamandalam (Ooty), Tamil Nadu, with military honours, adjacent to his wife's grave. A state funeral was accorded to him. Bangladesh paid tribute to Manekshaw on his death. He was survived by two daughters and three grandchildren.

=== Character ===
Manekshaw was charismatic and could be charming. He was often described as a gentleman. Like others of his generation, his background in the British army gave him a fondness for some English habits, such as drinking whisky and having a handlebar moustache. His background as a Parsi was sometimes considered a factor in his ambition and success. He commanded great loyalty from his troops, particularly the Gorkhas, due to his reputation for personal bravery, fairness and forgiveness.

Manekshaw came into conflict with politicians, because he stood up to their often unreasonable or unethical demands. They also disliked his popularity as they feared the possibility of a military coup. He dealt with politicians' demands through sarcasm, which was recognised by figures such as Indira Gandhi. He did not hesitate advocating for better strategies than those developed by the civilian establishment, a trait rarely found in the military leadership today, according to Admiral Arun Prakash.

== Honours and decorations ==
Manekshaw was awarded the Military Cross in 1942 for his display of gallantry in Burma during World War II against the Japanese at the battle of Pagoda Hill. He was awarded the civilian honours Padma Bhushan in 1968, and the Padma Vibhushan in 1972 for services rendered to the Indian Army as GOC-in-C Eastern Command and Chief of the Army Staff respectively.

	Padma Vibhushan	Padma Bhushan	
General Service Medal	Poorvi Star	Paschimi Star	Raksha Medal
Sangram Medal	Sainya Seva Medal	Indian Independence Medal	25th Anniversary Independence Medal
20 Years Long Service Medal	9 Years Long Service Medal	Military Cross	1939–45 Star
Burma Star	War Medal 1939–1945	India Service Medal	General Service Medal (1918)

== Legacy and assessment ==
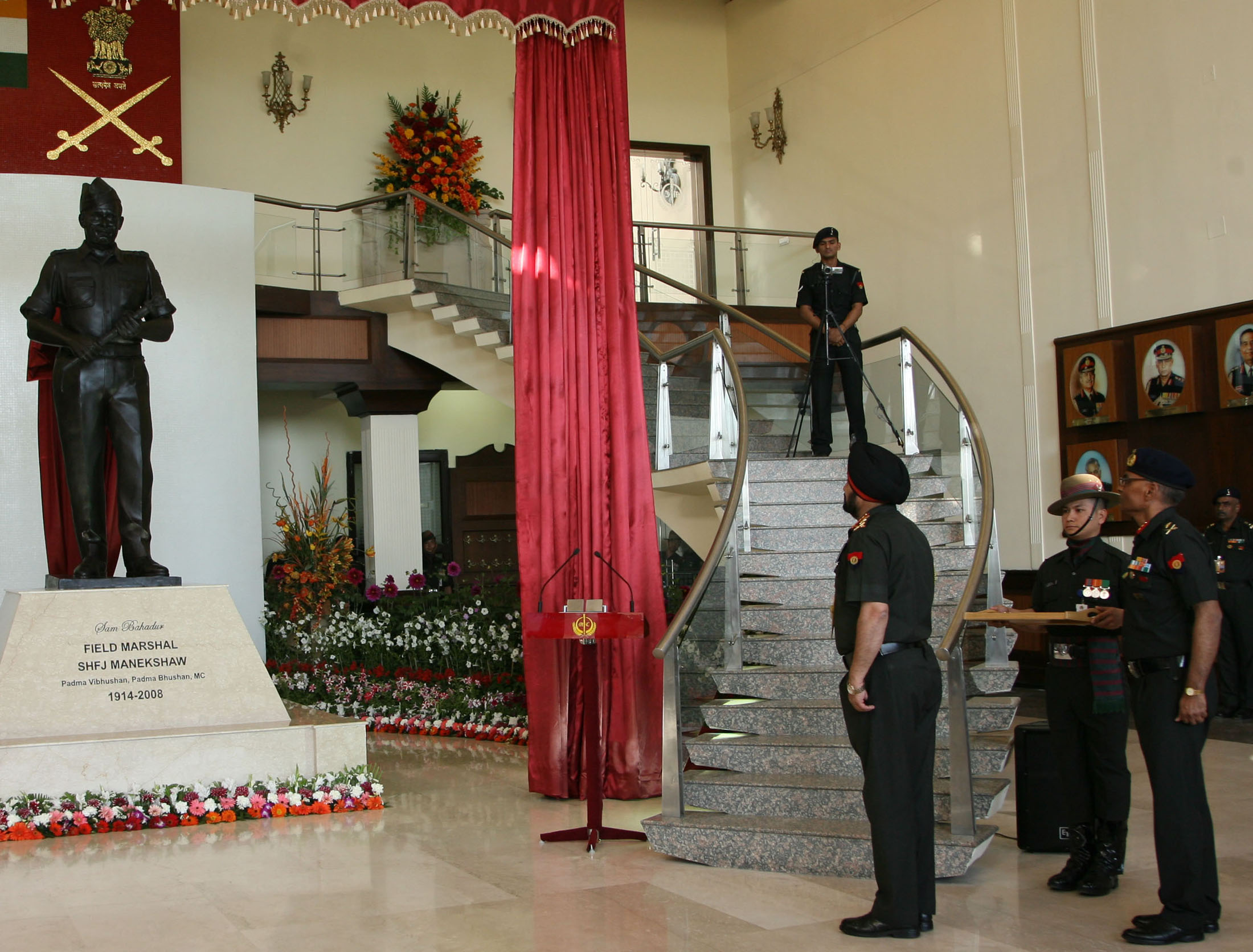
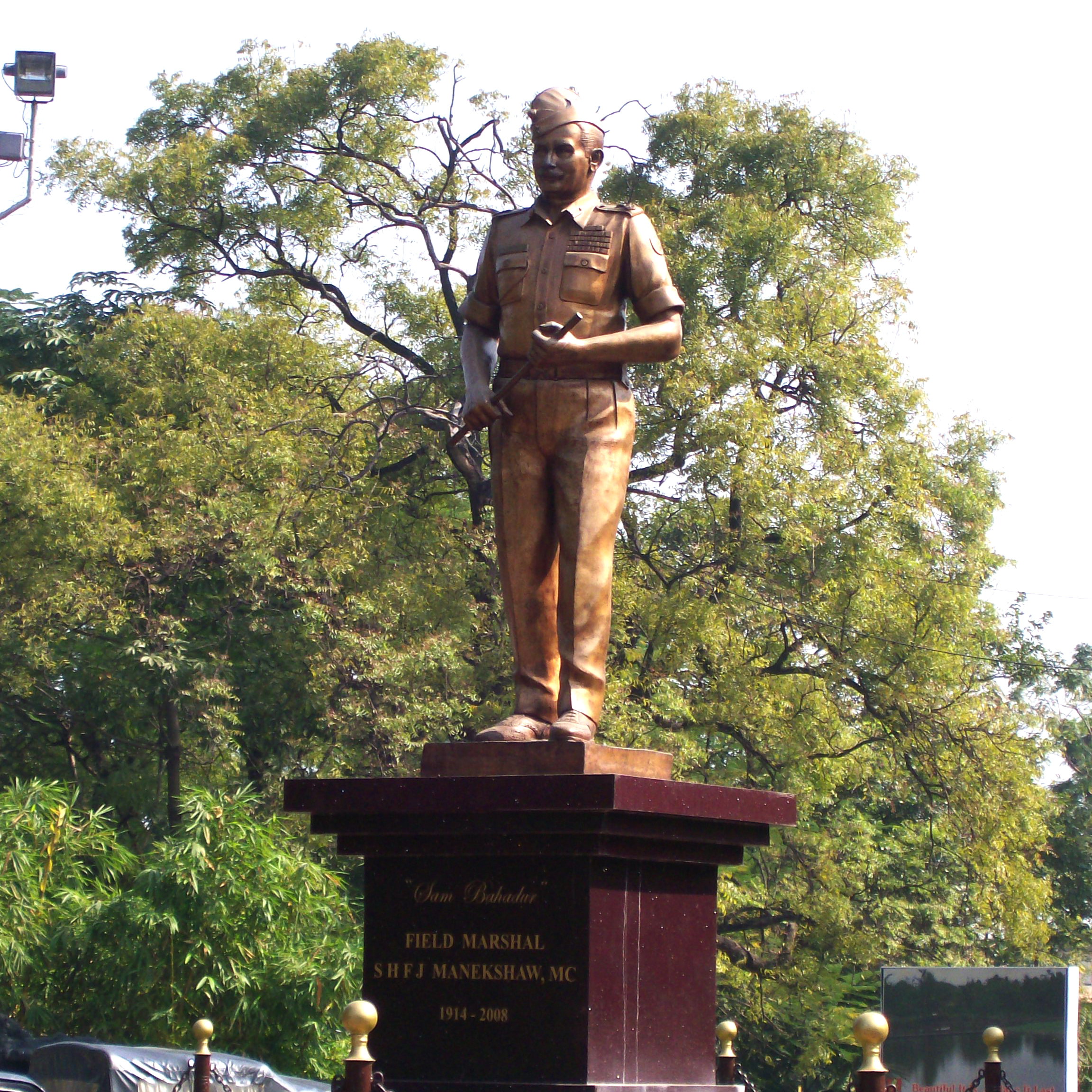
(left) COAS Gen. Bikram Singh unveiling the Field Marshal's statue at the Manekshaw Centre in Delhi Cantonment. (right) Manekshaw's statue at the Pune Cantonment.

Vijay Diwas (lit. Victory Day) is celebrated on 16 December every year in honor of the victory achieved under Manekshaw's leadership in 1971. On 16 December 2008, a postage stamp depicting Manekshaw in his field marshal's uniform was released by then President Pratibha Patil.

The Manekshaw Centre in the Delhi Cantonment is named for the field marshal. The centre was inaugurated by the President of India on 21 October 2010. The biannual Army Commanders' conference takes place at the centre. The Manekshaw parade ground in Bengaluru is also named after him. The Republic Day celebrations in Karnataka are held at this ground every year. A flyover bridge in Ahmedabad's Shivranjeeni area was named after him in 2008 by the then Chief Minister of Gujarat, Narendra Modi. In 2014, a granite statue was erected in his honour at Wellington, in the Nilgiris district, close to the Manekshaw Bridge on the Ooty–Coonoor road, which had been named after him in 2009. His statue is also on the Maneckji Mehta Road in Pune Cantonment. The Centre for Land Warfare Studies, an Indian military think tank, publishes its research papers in a collection called the Manekshaw Papers as a tribute to the field marshal.

Manekshaw has been portrayed in film and fiction. Vicky Kaushal played the role of Manekshaw in the 2023 biopic Sam Bahadur. He is also featured conversing with his Pakistani adversary and former Burma war colleague Tiger Niazi in Salman Rushdie's novel Midnight's Children, in the chapter entitled "Sam and the Tiger".

=== Soldiers' pay ===
In 1970, the Armed Forces and the Army in particular had the opportunity for the first time to get their pay determined by the Pay Commission, which set the pay levels for all other government employees. Armed Forces personnel had not been considered for the 1st and 2nd Pay Commissions but were to be considered for the 3rd Pay Commission. Manekshaw convinced the government to apply the 3rd Pay Commission's recommendations for military personnel and set pay scales for them proportionate to their service conditions (termed hazard pay), a practice which continues to this day.

=== Strategy and doctrine ===
Manekshaw's strategies during the 1971 war have been considered by analysts to be the precursor to the Indian Cold Start military doctrine, which calls for integrated offensive attacks. Formulated along with his deputies Aurora and Singh, Manekshaw's shock and awe tactic of deploying IV Corps, which was geographically disadvantaged, contributed significantly to the military victory. Analysts consider Manekshaw and Aurora to have created a Blitzkrieg style of warfare which was even more rapid. Manekshaw said the following about the campaign: "To say that it was something like what Rommel did would be ridiculous".

Defence analyst Robert M. Citino noted that the speed of the 1971 campaign had been impressive, but it had taken too much time to mobilise the units involved; its logistics had been rather crude; and it could have run into problems if there had been an air force in East Pakistan.

General André Beaufre, a French military theorist, had been invited by Manekshaw to analyse the 1971 war. Beaufre had previously observed the Battles of Chumb and Basantar from the Pakistani side. Beaufre concluded that the Indian operations on the Eastern Front were maneuver warfare but the operations in and around the Shakargarh bulge had been too slow.

On 12 October 1966, while on a flight from Delhi to Kolkata, Manekshaw was a co-passenger with William K. Hitchcock, the Consul General of the USA in Kolkata. On the flight, Manekshaw talked to Hitchcock about the need for more military involvement in Kashmir and criticized COAS Chaudhuri's decision to not deploy the 300,000 Indian soldiers of Eastern Command in the 1965 War due to fear of a Chinese offensive. Manekshaw also expressed his worries over India's dependence on Soviet defence equipment, and said he would have advocated for India taking a more American friendly stance on the Vietnam War if he had had more power.

=== Procurement ===
Manekshaw was an advocate for a strong domestic defence industrial base and procurement reforms, which he believed could shorten the long order and delivery cycles of the Indian Armed Forces. He was also a critic of defence equipment imports and over reliance on the Soviet Union and its successor state, Russia. During the 1971 War, Manekshaw managed to urgently procure equipment to achieve numerical superiority and raise new divisions. However, he could not make any lasting reforms to the procurement process.

=== Special operations ===
After being convinced by Brigadier Bhawani Singh on the need for special operations, Manekshaw approved the plans for the Chachro Raid, which the brigadier had drawn up himself. The raid resulted in the capture of 13,000 square kilometres (5,000 sq mi) of Pakistani territory up to Umerkot in Sindh province, and is considered by analysts to be the most successful operation by an Indian special operations unit.

=== Counter insurgency ===
While responding to the insurgency in Mizoram in 1966, Manekshaw implemented the policy of merging small villages (termed spatialisation) as a counter insurgency tool. The intended effect was to prevent insurgents from hiding in sparsely populated villages, and to enable safer civilian and military operations. By forcing insurgents to operate out of uninhabited areas, they were denied access to food and supplies; the army also had to patrol a smaller area and did not have to engage in high casualty urban warfare as a result of the policy.

== See also ==
- Field Marshal K.M. Cariappa
- Marshal of the Indian Air Force Arjan Singh

== Bibliography ==
=== Books ===
- Indian Army (1945). List for October 1945 (Part I). Indian Army, Government of India.
- Indian Army (1947). List Special Edition for August 1947. Indian Army, Government of India.
- Sharma, Satinder (2007). Services Chiefs of India. Northern Book Centre. ISBN 978-8-1721-1162-5.
- Singh, Vijay Kumar (2005). Leadership in the Indian Army: Biographies of Twelve Soldiers. SAGE Publications. ISBN 978-0-7619-3322-9.
- Sinha, Srinivas Kumar (1992). A Soldier Recalls. Lancer Publishers. ISBN 978-8-1706-2161-4.

=== News articles ===
- "Obituary: Sam Manekshaw". The Economist. No. 5 (July 2008). 3 July 2008. p. 107. Archived from the original on 6 July 2008.
- Mehta, Ashok K. (27 January 2003). "Play It Again, Sam: A Tribute to the Man Whose Wit Was as Astounding as His Military Skill". Outlook. Archived from the original on 19 August 2012.
- Pandya, Haresh (30 June 2008). "Sam H.F.J. Manekshaw Dies at 94; Key to India's Victory in 1971 War". The New York Times. ISSN 0362-4331. Archived from the original on 12 December 2023.
- Saighal, Vinod (30 June 2008). "Field Marshal Sam Manekshaw". [The Guardian]]. Archived from the original on 23 September 2016.

Military offices
Preceded by P. P. Kumaramangalam	General Officer Commanding 26th Infantry Division; 1957–1959	Succeeded by Kashmir Singh Katoch
Preceded by P. P. Kumaramangalam	Commandant of the Defence Services Staff College; 1959–1962	Succeeded by D. Som Dutt
Preceded by Brij Mohan Kaul	General Officer Commanding IV Corps; 1962–1963	Succeeded by Manmohan Khanna
Preceded by Daulet Singh	General Officer Commanding-in-Chief Western Command; 1963–1964	Succeeded by Harbaksh Singh
Preceded by P. P. Kumaramangalam	General Officer Commanding-in-Chief Eastern Command; 1964–1969	Succeeded by Jagjit Singh Aurora
Preceded by P. P. Kumaramangalam	Chief of the Army Staff; 1964–1969	Succeeded by Gopal Gurunath Bewoor
Preceded by Adhar Kumar Chatterji	Chairman of the Chiefs of Staff Committee; 1970–1973	Succeeded by Gopal Gurunath Bewoor
