= Chhering Mutup =

Indian military officer (1945–2025)

Naib Subedar Chhering Mutup AC
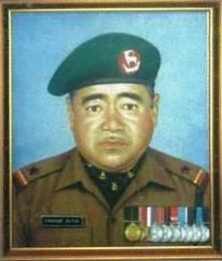
- Portrait of Naib Subedar Chhering Mutup
- Born: c.1945 Likar Village, Leh District, Ladakh, Jammu and Kashmir, British Raj
- Died: 3 August 2025 (age 80); Leh District, Ladakh, India
- Children: Subedar Major Sewang Mutup, VrC
- Military career
- Allegiance: India
- Branch: Indian Army
- Service years: 23 June 1965 – 1 July 1989
- Rank: Naib Subedar
- Service number: 9920311
- Unit: Ladakh Scouts
- Awards: Ashoka Chakra

Naib Subedar Chhering Mutup AC (c. 1945–3 August 2025) was a highly decorated Junior Commissioned Officer (JCO) with the Ladakh Scouts. He was awarded the Ashoka Chakra, India's highest peacetime military decoration.

On 21 February 1985, Lance Havildar Chhering Mutup headed a team of soldiers that attacked and captured a crest in the Siachen glacier. In spite of bad weather and poor visibility, Chhering and his team accomplished the difficult task.

== Early life ==
Chhering Mutup was born in Likir, Leh, Ladakh and joined the Ladakh Scouts in 1965.

== Military career ==
Chhering volunteered to lead a patrol to capture the crest line overlooking an Indian post on the Saltoro ridge. He accomplished the task in extremely hostile weather in high altitude. For the gallantry he displayed, he was awarded the Ashok Chakra in 1985. He retired as an Honorary Naib Subedar on 1 July 1989.

== Ashoka Chakra Citation & Other Medals... ==
The Ashoka Chakra citation on the Official Indian Army Website reads as follows:

CITATION

L/HAV CHHERING MUTUP
LADAKH SCOUTS (9920311)
(Effective date of the award: 21st February, 1985)

Lance Havildar Chhering Mutup was required to accomplish an extremely difficult assignment in one of the forward locations of Jammu and Kashmir. Undeterred by extremely hostile conditions of altitude, high velocity winds, heavy snow and blizzards, Lance Havildar Chhering Mutup led his patrol gallantly from fold to fold and accomplish the assignment. In the process, he exhibited the most conspicuous courage, bold initiative and presence of mind.

Lance Havildar Chhering Mutup thus displayed the most conspicuous gallantry, cool courage and devotion to duty of an exceptionally high order.

Military Decorations -

	Ashoka Chakra	Paschimi Star	
Siachen Glacier Medal	Raksha Medal	Sangram Medal	Sainya Seva Medal
High Altitude Medal	25th Independence Anniversary Medal	20 Years Long Service Medal	9 Years Long Service Medal

== Family ==
Mutup's son Tsewang Morup also joined the Indian Army, serving with 2 Ladakh Scouts, and was awarded the Vir Chakra for outstanding gallantry in the 1999 Kargil War. He achieved the rank of subedar-major in 2023, and was killed in an accident on 1 April 2023, when his car skidded off a road near Leh.
