= Gopal Gurunath Bewoor =

Indian Army general

General Gopal Gurunath Bewoor PVSM
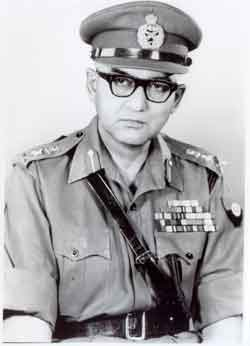

8th Chief of Army Staff (India)
- In office 16 Jan 1973 – 31 May 1975
- President: V. V. Giri; Fakhruddin Ali Ahmed
- Prime Minister: Indira Gandhi
- Preceded by: Field Marshal Sam Manekshaw
- Succeeded by: General Tapishwar Narain Raina

Ambassador of India to Denmark
- In office Feb 1976 – Feb 1978

Personal details
- Born: 11 August 1916 Seoni, Central Provinces and Berar, British India
- Died: 24 October 1989 (aged 73)
- Spouse: Radhika Gokhale
- Military career
- Allegiance: British India; India
- Branch: British Indian Army; Indian Army
- Service years: 15 July 1937 – 31 May 1975
- Rank: General
- Service number: IC-129
- Unit: Dogra Regiment 10th Baluch Regiment Green Howards
- Commands: Southern Army; XXXIII Corps; 27 Infantry Division; 80 Infantry Brigade; Director General, NCC
- Awards: Param Vishisht Seva Medal; Padma Bhushan (1972)

General Gopal Gurunath Bewoor PVSM (11 August 1916 – 24 October 1989) was a senior officer of the Indian Army who served as the 8th Chief of Army Staff, and later an Indian diplomat to Denmark.

In a long service spanning four decades, Gen. Bewoor saw action during World War II. He was also involved in Indian Army operations in Pakistan, including during the second war in 1965 as well as effectively commanding the southern command during the third war in 1971. He succeeded Field Marshal Sam Manekshaw as the army chief in January 1973 and following his retirement from the army, served as the Indian Ambassador to Denmark till 1979.

In 1972, he was honoured with Padma Bhushan the third highest Indian civilian award.

== Family and education ==
Born at Seoni on 11 August 1916 into Kannada Deshastha Brahmin family. Gopal Gurunath Bewoor was the son of Sir Gurunath Venkatesh Bewoor ICS and Rukmini Bewoor. He was educated at Colonel Brown Cambridge School, Dehradun, Prince of Wales Royal Indian Military College (RIMC), Dehradun in 1928 and later the Indian Military Academy. A part of the Kitchener section, Gopal was appointed Cadet Captain in 1934. He also won Lord Rawlinson's trophy during this time.

== Commissioned into the Indian Army ==
Bewoor was commissioned a second lieutenant on the Special List, Indian Land Forces on 15 July 1937. On 10 August 1937 he was attached to the 2nd Battalion, Green Howards, and saw action during operations in Waziristan. On 10 August 1938 he was admitted to the Indian Army and posted to 5th Battalion 10th Baluch Regiment (now 12 Baloch), with which he saw action in Burma. His seniority as a second lieutenant was antedated to 30 August 1936 and he was promoted to lieutenant 30 November 1938. In July 1945, he was transferred from the 5th Baluch and went on to attend the Staff College course at Quetta, and then he was appointed the Under Secretary (Military) to the Viceroy's Coordination Council. He was the only Indian officer to have achieved this feat.

At Independence in 1947, Bewoor was the Secretary of the Army Partition Committee in 1947, which determined the allotment of weapons, equipment and regiments that were to remain in India or to be allotted to Pakistan. Since his parent regiment - the Baluch - went to Pakistan, he was transferred to the Dogra Regiment and promoted to acting lieutenant colonel in December 1947. With a view to imparting basic military training to school and college students, he was appointed the Director of the NCC (National Cadet Corps) in April 1948 with the acting rank of full colonel, and was promoted to substantive major on 30 August 1949.

== Promoted to general rank ==
He was promoted to the acting rank of Brigadier in 1951, later assuming command of the 80th Infantry Brigade in Jammu & Kashmir. He was appointed the Director, Personnel Services at Army HQ in August 1953, and was promoted to substantive colonel on 30 August 1956. The following year, on 4 June 1957, he was again promoted to acting brigadier and given command of an infantry brigade.

On 27 February 1959 at the age of 42 years and 6 months he was promoted to acting Major General as the first Chief of Staff at the Western Command HQ in Shimla. He is believed to be the second youngest ever Major General in the Indian Army, (Gen JN Chaudhury being the youngest, when he was promoted to acting Major General at the age of 39 years and 8 months.) Promoted to substantive brigadier on 30 August 1959, he assumed the appointment of Colonel of the 11 Gorkha Rifles on 25 May 1960. He was then appointed the GOC of the 27th Infantry Division on 17 February 1961 at Jalandhar. Later he moved this division to Kalimpong (West Bengal) in the wake of the 1962 Sino-Indian War.

In June 1963, he was appointed the Director of Military Training at Army HQ and remained there till November 1964. He was promoted as General Officer Commanding 33 Corps at Siliguri in November 1964 with the rank of lieutenant general. He moved to Army HQ in May 1967 as Deputy Chief of the Army Staff (DCOAS), to which he had been appointed on 27 April, and held that appointment till June 1969. As DCOAS, he was awarded Param Vishist Seva Medal (PVSM) for his meritorious services. However, he has been later criticized for his role in changing the General Staff Qualitative Requirement (GSQR) for evaluation of anti-tank missiles which resulted in the purchase of the SS11B1 from France's Aerospatiale and the death of a competing indigenous DRDO Anti Tank Missile project.

In July 1969, he assumed the appointment of General Officer Commanding–in–Chief, Southern Command. During the Indo-Pakistani War of 1971, the Indian military strategy was mainly defensive on the Western Front, while attacking in the Eastern Sector, culminating in the surrender of Dacca and the secession of East Pakistan into the newly formed Bangladesh. Bewoor's Southern Command was tasked with maintaining a front from Bikaner southwestwards to the Arabian Sea. This command was divided into four sectors: Bikaner, Jaisalmer, Barmer and Kutch. The first two sectors were manned by 12 Division with 11 Division holding Barmer and Kutch. In addition it was supported by an armoured regiment, two independent armoured squadrons, and one missile squadron. For his command of operations in the Rajasthan Sector, Bewoor was awarded the Padma Bhushan, India's third highest civilian honour.

== As Chief of Army Staff ==
He succeeded the popular Field Marshal Sam Manekshaw, the liberator of Bangladesh, as Army Chief on 15 January 1973 and held that appointment for two years and four months till his retirement on 31 May 1975.

Soon after taking office Bewoor was told of one of the most significant developments in the history of Indian defence policy, of which the Indian Army and the Defence Ministry were previously in the dark, namely the Department of Atomic Energy's plans to detonate a nuclear device. The project codenamed Smiling Buddha had been underway from 1967 under the leadership of Raja Ramanna. The task of sinking the shaft for the test was assigned to the 61 Engineering Regiment stationed in Jodhpur. Ramanna first contacted the regiment commander, Lt. Col. Subherwal, in May 1973 to dig the shaft. In June 1973 Prime Minister Indira Gandhi took General Bewoor into confidence and ordered him to support the project. After an initial setback - the finding of water at the first drill site - the location of the test was shifted to the village of Malki near Pokhran, Rajasthan. Bewoor was personally present at the test site and witnessed the actual nuclear explosion of 18 May 1974. He was the first to inform the Prime Minister's Office via a telephone call to D.P. Dhar. A. Parthasarthi however claims in 1974 he found a note written from the PM (without her characteristic green-ink initials) to Bewoor dated as early as 15 November 1972 asking for the Army's co-operation. This must be viewed with some skepticism, since Bewoor was not the COAS on the purported date of this note.

== After retirement ==
He served as the Honorary Colonel of the Dogra Regiment up to 11 August 1979. After retirement, he served as the Indian Ambassador to Denmark, from February 1976 to March 1978. He served as a member of the Senate of the University of Pune, for two years from August 1979 onwards. He was also on the Board of Directors of Kirloskar Oil Engines & Vickers Sperry of Pune. Besides, he was often invited to give talks on leadership and military matters by various educational societies. He died on 24 October 1989.

The street in Koregaon Park, Pune where the general lived after retirement is named General Bewoor Path after him.

== Family ==
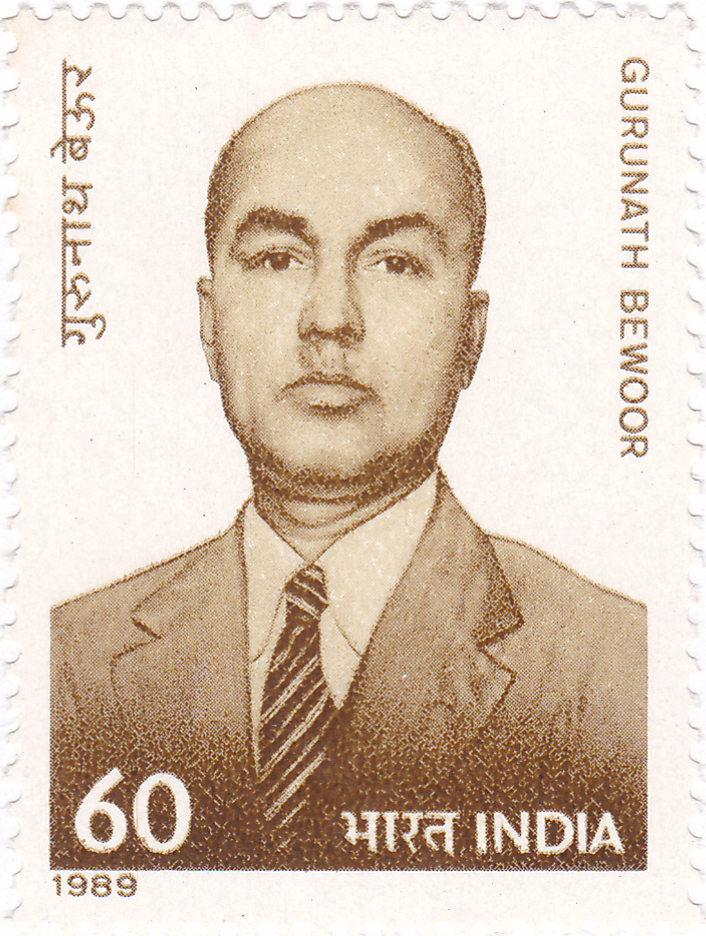
Gurunath Venkatesh Bewoor 1989 stamp of India

General Bewoor was married to Radhika Gokhale on 12 March 1943. They had two sons and a daughter.

His son Group Captain Anant Bewoor (Retd), served in the Indian Air Force and saw action with the IPKF in Sri Lanka and during the Siachen operations, and was the Commanding Officer (CO) of the 44th Squadron, which flies the IL-76 heavy-lift military transport aircraft. His younger son, Keshav Bewoor, is also an Air Force officer, and retired from service in the rank of Air Vice Marshal.

Arun Bewoor, former managing director, International Flavors and Fragrances is the son of his late brother Madhav Gurunath Bewoor.

Meenakshi Bakhle (wife of D.S. Bakhle, ICS) was General Bewoor's sister. She was a president of the Maharashtra State Women's Council. For her (minor) role in the Samyukta Maharashtra controversy in 1956 she was famously referred to as कोमडी चोमडी मिनाक्षी ("Komdi Chomdi Meenakshi") by "Acharya" Prahlad Keshav Atre and satirized as a अति विशाल महिला ("Ati Vishaal Mahilaa") in the famous P.L. Deshpande 1957 play तुझे आहे तुजपाशी ("Tujhe Ahe Tujapashi").

== Awards and decorations ==

Padma Bhushan	Param Vishisht Seva Medal	Samar Seva Star	Paschimi Star
Raksha Medal	Special Service Medal	Sangram Medal	Sainya Seva Medal
Indian Independence Medal	25th Anniversary of Independence Medal	20 Years Long Service Medal	9 Years Long Service Medal
1939–1945 Star	Burma Star	War Medal 1939–1945	India Service Medal

== Dates of rank ==
Insignia	Rank	Component	Date of rank
	Second Lieutenant	British Indian Army	15 July 1937
	Lieutenant	British Indian Army	30 November 1938
	Captain	British Indian Army	15 August 1940 (acting); 15 November 1940 (temporary); 16 August 1942 (war-substantive); 30 August 1944 (substantive)
	Major	British Indian Army	15 November 1940 (acting); 16 August 1942 (temporary)
	Captain	Indian Army	15 August 1947 (Note: Upon independence in 1947, India became a Dominion within the British Commonwealth of Nations. As a result, the rank insignia of the British Army, incorporating the Tudor Crown and four-pointed Bath Star ("pip"), was retained, as George VI remained Commander-in-Chief of the Indian Armed Forces. After 26 January 1950, when India became a republic, the President of India became Commander-in-Chief, and the Ashoka Lion replaced the crown, with a five-pointed star being substituted for the "pip.")
	Lieutenant-Colonel	Indian Army	December 1947 (acting)
	Colonel	Indian Army	April 1948 (acting)
	Major	Indian Army	30 August 1949
	Major	Indian Army	26 January 1950 (recommissioning and change in insignia)
	Lieutenant-Colonel	Indian Army	August 1953
	Colonel	Indian Army	30 August 1956
	Brigadier	Indian Army	1951 (acting); 4 June 1957 (acting); 30 August 1959 (substantive)
	Major General	Indian Army	27 February 1959 (acting); 1962 (substantive)
	Lieutenant-General	Indian Army	7 November 1964 (acting); 1965 (substantive)
	General (COAS)	Indian Army	15 January 1973

== Bibliography ==
- Wilkinson, Steven I. (2015), Army and Nation, Harvard University Press, ISBN 9780674967007

Military offices
Preceded by Sam Manekshaw	Chief of Army Staff; 1973–1975	Succeeded by Tapishwar Narain Raina
Preceded by Moti Sagar	General Officer Commanding-in-Chief Southern Command; 1969–1973	Succeeded by Sartaj Singh
Diplomatic posts
Preceded by Not sure	Ambassador of India to the Denmark; Feb 1976–Feb 1978	Succeeded by Not sure
