= Surendra Singh Panwar =

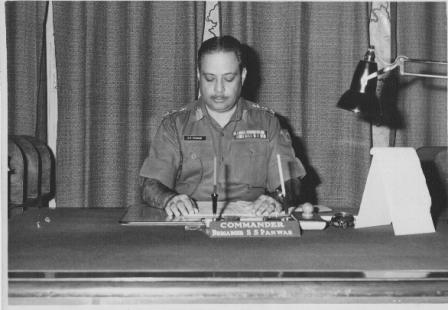
- Serving at Ambala
- Born: 19 October 1919; Dehradun, India
- Died: 29 April 2002 (aged 82); Dehradun, India
- Military career
- Allegiance: India
- Branch: Indian Army
- Service years: 1942–1973
- Rank: Brigadier
- Unit: Regiment of Artillery
- Conflicts: World War II; Indo-Pakistani War of 1947; Sino-Indian War; Indo-Pakistan War of 1965

Brigadier Surendra Singh Panwar (19 October 1919 – 29 April 2002) served as an artillery officer in the Indian Army.

== Early life and education ==
Surendra Panwar was born in Dehradun, and attended Colonel Brown Cambridge School as a child. He pursued post-secondary studies at Allahabad University.

== Military career ==
Surendra Panwar entered the Indian Military Academy and was commissioned as a second lieutenant in the Royal Regiment of Indian Artillery on 3 May 1942. He went on to serve with the Dagger Division (19th Infantry Division) in Burma during World War II and in the Indo-Pakistani War of 1947. In 1949 he entered the British Long Gunnery Staff Course at the School of Anti-aircraft Artillery in Manorbier, Pembrokeshire, Wales. A graduate of the Defence Services Staff College in Wellington, his service continued in the Sino-Indian War of 1962 and the Indo-Pakistan War of 1965. In between the wars, Brigadier Panwar created the Air Defence Brigade for New Delhi in 1964. In 1968-1969 he represented India, serving as chairman on the International Control Commission in Vietnam. At the end of his tenure he served as Sub-Area commander for Lucknow from 1969 to 1971, and Ambala from 1971 to 1972. Among his many appointments, he was Chief Instructor at the School of Artillery in Deolali and the Deputy Director of Artillery at Army Headquarters. He retired as a Brigadier in 1973.

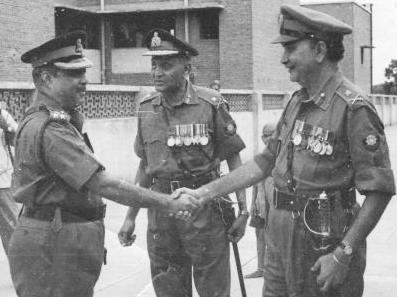
Brig. S. S. Panwar (far left) with Lt. Gen. Premindra Singh Bhagat VC (far right)

== Later life ==
He would later serve as President of the All India Gurkha Ex-Servicemen Welfare Association from 1983 to 2002, providing guidance and looking after the welfare of ex-Gurkha soldiers and their families. Surendra Panwar would also serve on the board of trustees for Cambrian Hall and the Gurkha Military College.

== Campaign Medals ==
- War Medal 1939–1945
- Burma Star
- 1939–1945 Star
- Sainya Seva Medal
- Sangram Medal
- Raksha Medal
- Paschimi Star
- Samar Seva Star
- International Commission for Supervision and Control

== Service Medals ==
- Indian Independence Medal
- 25th Independence Anniversary Medal
- 20 Years Long Service Medal
- 9 Years Long Service Medal
- Videsh Seva Medal

== See also ==
- Indian Army
