= Abhey Singh =

- Abhey Singh as a Second Lieutenant, Age 18
- Born: 14 August 1922; Kota, India
- Died: June 1981 (aged 58); Kota, India
- Military career
- Allegiance: India
- Branch: Indian Army
- Rank: Major
- Units: Indian Armoured Corps; 18th King Edward's Own Cavalry; The Poona Horse
- Conflicts: World War II; Indo-Pakistani War of 1947; Operation Polo; Indo-Pakistani War of 1965; Indo-Pakistani War of 1971

Major Abhey Singh (14 August 1922 – June 1981) was a cavalry officer in the Indian Army.

== Early life ==
Abhey Singh was born in the Thikana of Palaitha in the Princely state of Kotah on 14 August 1922, the youngest son of Major-General Sir Onkar Singh, KCIE, a minister for the state of Kotah. He attended the Prince of Wales Royal Indian Military College (RIMC) from 20 January 1934 to October 1940. Afterwards he entered the Indian Military Academy.

== Military career ==
Upon graduation he was commissioned as a Second Lieutenant with the 18th King Edward's Own Cavalry on 1 December 1941. His regiment was part of the 3rd Indian Motor Brigade, which was fighting in the North African Campaign under General Ritchie's British 8th Army. During the Battle of Gazala, his brigade formed the southernmost point of the Gazala Line near Bir Hacheim. On 27 May 1942, Italy's Ariete Armoured Division overran the 3rd Indian Motor Brigade. Following this defeat, Abhey Singh was taken prisoner and sent to P. G. 71 in Aversa near Naples for internment. In May 1943, he was sent to P. G. 91 in Avezzano. In the confusion that followed the Italian surrender in September 1943, he would escape from Avezzano with Maj. P. P. Kumaramangalam and Lt. Sahabzada Yaqub Khan. Lt. Yaqub Khan spoke Italian which enabled them to solicit assistance from rural Italians who were sympathetic to the Allies. They spent four to five months attempting to move south to Allied lines, but were subsequently re-captured by German forces. Following his re-capture, he spent the remainder of the war in Oflag 79 near Braunschweig. His camp was eventually liberated by the US Ninth Army on 12 April 1945.

After the Second World War ended, Abhey Singh was transferred to the 17th Queen Victoria's Own Cavalry (The Poona Horse). In 1948, Major Abhey Singh participated in Operation Polo. On 6 September 1948, Abhey Singh led a tank squadron against the Nizam of Hyderabad's troops who had been harassing the citizens of Mangala Enclave in south-western Hyderabad State. The engagement resulted in the capture of two officers, four JCOs, and 90 other ranks.of the Hyderabad Army. To show their gratitude, the citizens of Mangala Enclave presented a silver replica of the Ashoka Pillar to Major Abhey Singh.

== Campaign Medals ==
- War Medal 1939–1945
- Defence Medal
- France and Germany Star
- Italy Star
- Africa Star
- 1939–1945 Star
- Sainya Seva Medal
- Sangram Medal
- Raksha Medal
- Paschimi Star
- Samar Seva Star

== Indian Army Decorations ==
- Wound Medal

== Service Decorations ==
- Indian Independence Medal
- 25th Independence Anniversary Medal
- 20 Years Long Service Medal
- 9 Years Long Service Medal

== See also ==
- Indian Army
