= Denzil Keelor =

Indian Air Force Vir Chakra recipient (1933–2024)

Air Marshal Denzil Joseph Keelor PVSM, KC, AVSM, VrC
- Born: 7 December 1933; Lucknow, United Provinces of Agra and Oudh, British India
- Died: 28 August 2024 (aged 90)
- Relatives: Wing Commander Trevor Keelor (brother)
- Military career
- Allegiance: India
- Branch: India Air Force
- Service years: 1954–1991
- Rank: Air Marshal
- Service number: 4805
- Commands: Maharajpur Air Force Station; Tactics and Air Combat Development Establishment; 4 Squadron
- Conflicts: Indo-Pakistani War of 1965
- Awards: Param Vishisht Seva Medal; Kirti Chakra; Ati Vishisht Seva Medal; Vir Chakra

Air Marshal Denzil Keelor PVSM, KC, AVSM, VrC (7 December 1933 – 28 August 2024) was an air officer of the Indian Air Force and a hero of the Indo-Pakistani War of 1965. He had a younger brother Trevor, who was also honoured for his service in the Indian Air Force. The brothers were both awarded the Vir Chakra for shooting down Pakistan Air Force Sabres.

== Background ==
Keelor was born in Lucknow on 7 December 1933, to Charles and Isabel Grace Keelor and was a sibling of Gordon, Trevor, Cynthia, and Marie Viegas Jones. He attended St. Francis' College in Lucknow, before studying at St George's College in Mussoorie. He also attended La Martinière College, Lucknow. His younger brother, Trevor, also attended La Martinière; both enlisted in the Indian Air Force and both won Gallantry Awards.

Keelor died on 28 August 2024, at the age of 90.

== Military career ==
Keelor was commissioned into the Indian Air Force on 6 November 1954. He scored a kill during the Indo-Pakistani War of 1965.

=== Vir Chakra ===
Denzil Keelor's first award was the Vir Chakra in 1965. The citation for the Vir Chakra reads as follows:

Gazette Notification: 133 Pres/65, 22-9-65

Operation: 1965 Riddle Date of Award: 19 Sep 1965

CITATION

SQUADRON LEADER DENZIL KEELOR

(4805) GD (P)

On the 19th September 1965, Squadron Leader Denzil Keelor was providing fighter escort to Mystere aircraft during a strike mission in the operations against Pakistan. His section of four Gnat aircraft was engaged by four enemy Sabre jet aircraft and the battle was fought at a height of less than 2000 feet from the ground where enemy anti-aircraft guns were also active. Under his guidance, his sub-section leader shot down a Sabre jet aircraft. Thereafter Squadron Leader Keelor himself engaged another Sabre Jet and crippled it.

Throughout the operations Squadron Leader Denzil Keelor was a source of inspiration to his pilots and ground personnel. His courage and devotion to duty were in the best traditions of the Indian Air Force.

Keelor took command of the 4 Squadron in early January 1973. The squadron was based out of Tezpur Air Force Station. In 1977, he took over as the Commandant of the Tactics and Air Combat Development Establishment (TACDE), the premier training establishment of the Indian Air Force which trains the best fighter pilots in aerial combat.

=== Kirti Chakra ===
The citation for the Kirti Chakra reads as follows:

Date of Award: 27 Mar 1978

CITATION

GROUP CAPTAIN DENZIL KEELOR, VrC

(4805) FLYING (PILOT)

On the 27th March, 1978, while Group Captain Denzil Keelor was flying a combat aircraft at high altitude, its canopy flew off and this exposed him to explosive decompression ad severe wind blast. His eyes, ear-drum and left arm were injured and he experienced great difficulty in controlling the aircraft. Although abandoning the aircraft in the circumstances would have been justified, he decided to recover the aircraft. Under these adverse conditions, wherein he was not able to have a proper view due to wind blast, and that too only with one eye, he brought the aircraft back to base and executed a safe emergency landing.

Again, on 17th May 1978, during a live airto-air sortie, a 23 mm High Explosive shell burst as it left the gun muzzle. Shrapnel damaged the aircraft and caused total failure and a serious throttle restriction. The cone extended fully and the associated engine rumbling and surge gave every indication of engine bearing failure. Without electric instruments and Radio Telephony, Group Captain Keelor had no way of either knowing what had happened or of asking for assistance. Assuming that the engine bearing had failed, he decided to attempt am emergency recovery. With his flying skill and experience, he returned to the airfield, set up a flame out pattern and executed a safe landing. The throttle was stuck at 60% revolutions per minute, and in spite of this he was able to stop the aircraft without damage.

Group Captain Denzil Keelor thus displayed conspicuous courage, exemplary professional skill and devotion to duty of an exceptional order.

Gp. Capt. Keelor who had rich and wide combat experience and the destruction of a Sabre aircraft to his credit, was flying a MiG-21 FL on 27 Mar 78, when due to structural failure the canopy of the aircraft detached and flew off. Gp Capt Keelor felt sudden decompression and loss of control, but managed to fly back to base and execute a safe emergency landing without the canopy. Later on 17 May 78, during firing trials one of the 23 mm Cannon Shells exploded causing extensive damage and total electrical failure to his aircraft. He successfully executed another safe landing back at his airbase.

From 1980 to 1982, Keelor served as the air attaché at the Embassy of India in Paris, France, in the rank of air commodore. He later took over command of the Maharajpur Air Force Station as air officer commanding. Keelor was awarded the Ati Vishist Seva Medal on 26 January 1986 and the Param Vishist Seva Medal on 26 January 1989.

He retired in 1991. Following his retirement he worked as the president of the YMCA for ten years. He was the chairman of Special Olympics Bharat.

== Awards and decorations ==

Param Vishisht Seva Medal		Kirti Chakra	
Ati Vishisht Seva Medal	Vir Chakra		Wound Medal
General Service Medal	Samar Seva Star	Poorvi Star	Paschimi Star
Raksha Medal	Sangram Medal	Sainya Seva Medal	Videsh Seva Medal
25th Anniversary of Independence Medal	30 Years Long Service Medal	20 Years Long Service Medal	9 Years Long Service Medal
