= Kanwar Jaideep Singh Salaria =

Colonel Kanwar Jaideep Singh Salaria SC & BAR SM
- कंवर जयदीप सिंह सलारिया
- Born: 18 July 1961; Pathankot , Punjab
- Died: 18 August 2002 (aged 41); Nowshera, Rajouri, Jammu and Kashmir
- Alma mater: Officers Training Academy
- Military career
- Allegiance: India
- Branch: Indian Army
- Service years: 1983 — 2002
- Rank: Colonel
- Service number: IC-45120L
- Unit: 5 Dogra Regiment
- Commands: 5 Dogra Regiment; 6 Dogra Regiment
- Conflicts: Operation Parakram †
- Awards: Shaurya Chakra & BAR; Sena Medal

Kanwar Jaideep Singh Salaria was a colonel in the Indian Army who was twice awarded Shaurya Chakra, India's second highest peacetime gallantry award. He was killed in action during the 2001–2002 India–Pakistan standoff, also known as Operation Parakham.

== Early life ==
Salaria was born on July 18, 1961 in Pathankot, Punjab. He belonged to a military family, as his father was an army officer. After completing graduation, he joined the Officers Training Academy.

== Military career ==
Being a second generation army officer, Salaria was commissioned in the 5 Dogra Regiment in 1983. As a Major, he received the Shaurya Chakra for his gallantry actions in 1997. He is also a recipient of the Sena Medal.

In the early hours of 2002, Salaria had been appointed as the commanding officer of the 6 Dogra, situated at Jammu and Kashmir near LOC. On 18 August 2002, Salaria led his troops for a regular patrol. During the patrol, his team was ambushed by some terrorists at Rajouri. During heavy exchange of fire between his troops and the terrorists, Salaria was shot in the neck after he reportedly killed two terrorists. He couldn't sustain the injuries and died there. For his actions, the Government of India posthumously awarded him Shaurya Chakra for the second time.

== Awards and decorations ==
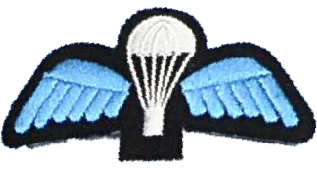

Parachutist Badge
Shaurya Chakra & BAR (1997 & 2002); Posthumously		Sena Medal	
Special Service Medal	Sainya Seva Medal	50th Independence Anniversary Medal	9 Years Long Service Medal
