= Awards and decorations of the Indian Armed Forces =

Military awards and decorations of India

The Armed Forces of India are eligible for many military decorations awarded for extraordinary bravery and distinguished service during times of war and peace. Service and campaign medals have been awarded throughout India's history as an independent state.

Post-nominal letters for wartime gallantry decorations were approved when those decorations were created in 1950. Until 27 January 1967, when they received their present names, the two lower peacetime gallantry decorations and the two higher peacetime distinguished service medals were respectively distinct classes of the Ashoka Chakra and the Vishisht Seva Medal. Post-nominals for peacetime gallantry, peacetime distinguished service and branch distinguished service awards were approved in August 1967.

== Gallantry medals ==
Wartime gallantry awards

Ribbon	Name
	Param Vir Chakra (PVC)
	Maha Vir Chakra (MVC)
	Vir Chakra (VrC)

Peacetime gallantry awards

Ribbon	Name
	Ashok Chakra (AC)
	Kirti Chakra (KC)
	Shaurya Chakra (SC)

== Distinguished service medals ==
Wartime distinguished service medals

Ribbon	Name
	Sarvottam Yudh Seva Medal (SYSM)
	Uttam Yudh Seva Medal (UYSM)
	Yudh Seva Medal (YSM)

Peacetime distinguished service medals

Ribbon	Name
	Param Vishisht Seva Medal (PVSM)
	Ati Vishisht Seva Medal (AVSM)
	Vishisht Seva Medal (VSM)

Branch distinguished service medals

Ribbon	Name
	Sena Medal (Army) (SM)
	Nau Sena Medal (Navy) (NM)
	Vayu Sena Medal (Air Force) (VM)

== Service and campaign medals ==
Ribbon	Name
	Wound Medal
	General Service Medal
	Samanya Seva Medal
	Special Service Medal
	Samar Seva Star
	Poorvi Star
	Paschimi Star
	Operation Vijay Star
	Siachen Glacier Medal
	Raksha Medal
	Sangram Medal
	Operation Vijay Medal
	Operation Parakram Medal
	Sainya Seva Medal
	High Altitude Medal
	Videsh Seva Medal

== Long service awards ==
Ribbon	Name
	30 Years Long Service Medal
	20 Years Long Service Medal
	9 Years Long Service Medal
	Territorial Army Decoration
	Territorial Army Medal
	Meritorious Service Medal
	Long Service and Good Conduct Medal

== Independence medals ==
Ribbon	Name
	Indian Independence Medal
	25th Independence Anniversary Medal
	50th Independence Anniversary Medal
	75th Independence Anniversary Medal

== Mention in Dispatches ==
Mention in Dispatches has been used since 1947, in order to recognize distinguished and meritorious service in operational areas and acts of gallantry which are not of a sufficiently high order to warrant the grant of gallantry awards.

Eligible personnel include all Army, Navy and Air Force personnel including personnel of the Reserve Forces, Territorial Army, Militia and other lawfully constituted Armed Forces, members of the Nursing Service and Civilians working under or with the Armed Forces.

Personnel can be mentioned in dispatches posthumously and multiple awards are also possible. A recipient of a Mention in a Despatch is entitled to wear an emblem, in the form of a lotus leaf on the ribbon of the relevant Campaign Medal. They are also issued with an official certificate from the Ministry of Defence.

== Commendation Card ==
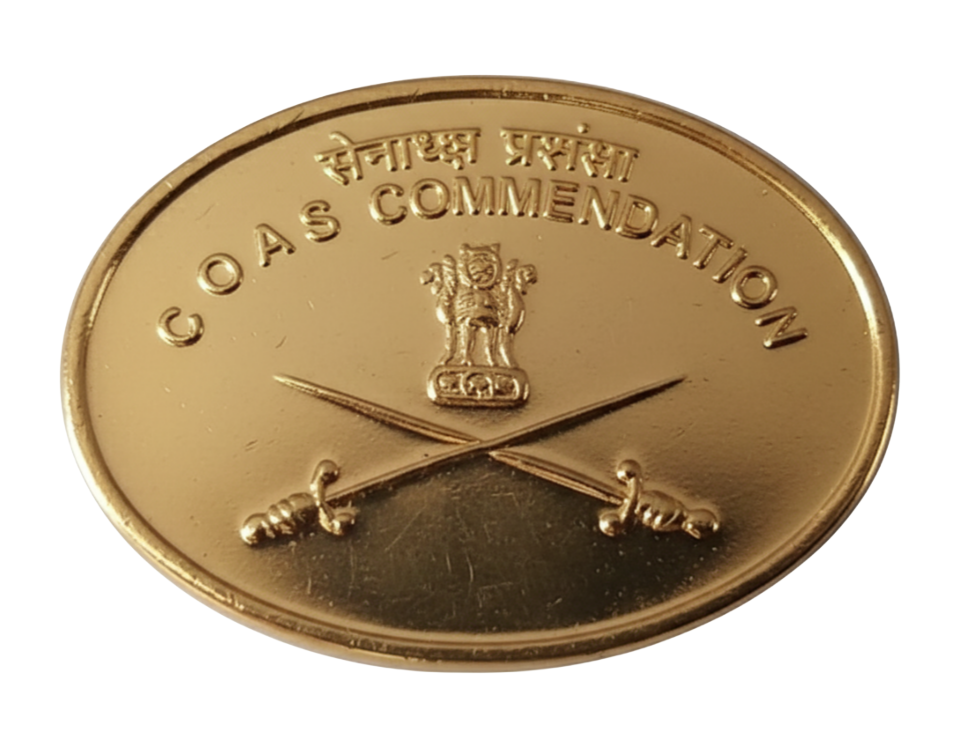
Chief of the Army Staff Commendation Card

All three branches of the military issue Commendation Cards, which are badges awarded for "individual acts of gallantry or distinguished service or devotion to duty performed either in operation or non-operational areas. It is a type of gallantry award. The award will be for a specific act of bravery or distinguished service or special service. The award will not be made posthumously."

All three branches issue Commendations Cards at the level of the highest officer (Chief of the Army Staff, Chief of the Naval Staff and Chief of the Air Staff). Additionally, Chief of Defence Staff also issues the Commendation Cards. The awards at lower levels seem to vary between services.

== Honorary Ranks ==
In the Indian Army, honorary ranks and commissions are conferred as a form of formal recognition, granted in exceptional cases, to eminent civilians through honorary commissions in the Territorial Army, the volunteer reserve component of the Indian Army.In the Territorial Army, honorary commissions have also been used to associate nationally prominent figures with the force and to strengthen public identification with military service.

Notable Territorial Army honorary rank holders

- Kapil Dev – Commissioned as an honorary lieutenant colonel in 2008. His induction was part of the Territorial Army's effort to associate itself with a nationally prominent sporting figure; later official releases also listed him among the honorary officers of the Territorial Army.
- Mohanlal – Inducted as an honorary lieutenant colonel in 2009. His commissioning reflected his stature as a major public figure and he was subsequently identified in official Territorial Army material as one of its eminent honorary officers.
- M. S. Dhoni – Commissioned as an honorary lieutenant colonel in 2011. The official announcement presented the honour as recognition of his stature and stated that such honorary officers would help strengthen citizen-soldier bonds. The recognition was for his outstanding contribution to sport and his commitment to the Army on various occasions, and his discipline, leadership under adversity, and physical standards that reflected qualities valued by the Army
- Abhinav Bindra – Commissioned as an honorary lieutenant colonel in 2011. His appointment followed his prominence as an Olympic gold medallist and formed part of the same round of honorary Territorial Army recognitions announced by the Ministry of Defence.
- Deepak Rao – Commissioned as an honorary major in 2011. The honour was conferred upon him for being the first Indian to specialize in modern Close Quarter Battle Training (CQB), and for dedicating his life to the Army as an organisation, specifically by providing selfless service in training the armed forces in close quarter battle, Advanced Commando Combat System, and combating terrorism. Deepak Rao was recognized for what has been described as his "yeomen service to the nation" and his long-standing training contribution to the armed forces. Unlike better-known sportspersons such as M. S. Dhoni and Abhinav Bindra, who were nationally prominent figures, he was recognised in official and press accounts for his professional contributions to the modernisation of close-quarters battle training and for providing operational instruction to Indian armed forces personnel
- Neeraj Chopra – Formally conferred the honorary rank of lieutenant colonel in 2025. The Ministry of Defence stated that the honour recognised the pride he had brought to the nation and the armed forces through his achievements in international athletics.

== Order of wearing ==
The various decorations and medals are worn in the following order:

Precedence	Award name	Ribbon
1	Bharat Ratna (Note: These are civilian awards that can be awarded to military personnel.)	
2	Param Vir Chakra	
3	Ashoka Chakra	
4	Padma Vibhushan	
5	Padma Bhushan	
6	Sarvottam Yudh Seva Medal	
7	Param Vishisht Seva Medal	
8	Maha Vir Chakra	
9	Kirti Chakra	
10	Padma Shri	
11	Sarvottam Jeevan Raksha Padak (Note: These are civilian bravery awards that can be awarded to military personnel.)	
12	Uttam Yudh Seva Medal	
13	Ati Vishisht Seva Medal	
14	Vir Chakra	
15	Shaurya Chakra	
16	Yudh Seva Medal	
17	Sena Medal (for army personnel)	
17	Nau Sena Medal (for navy personnel)	
17	Vayu Sena Medal (for air force personnel)	
18	Vishisht Seva Medal	
19	Uttam Jeevan Raksha Padak	
20	Wound Medal	
21	General Service Medal	
22	Samanya Seva Medal	
23	Special Service Medal	
24	Samar Seva Star	
25	Poorvi Star	
26	Paschimi Star	
27	Operation Vijay Star	
28	Siachen Glacier Medal	
29	Raksha Medal	
30	Sangram Medal	
31	Operation Vijay Medal	
32	Operation Parakram Medal	
33	Sainya Seva Medal	
34	High Altitude Medal	
35	Videsh Seva Medal	
36	Meritorious Service Medal	
37	Long Service and Good Conduct Medal	
38	Jeevan Raksha Padak	
39	Territorial Army Decoration	
40	Territorial Army Medal	
41	Indian Independence Medal	
42	75th Independence Anniversary Medal	
43	50th Independence Anniversary Medal	
44	25th Independence Anniversary Medal	
45	30 Years Long Service Medal	
46	20 Years Long Service Medal	
47	9 Years Long Service Medal	
48	Commonwealth awards	
49	United Nations Medal	
50	Other awards	

Note that the Police Medals, Fire Services Medals, Correctional Services Medals, Home Guard and Civil Defence Medals, and Tatrakshak Medals are excluded from the above list. The above order of precedence of awards is as per the Indian Army. There are slight variations, especially in the campaign medals, in the order followed by the Indian Navy and the Indian Air Force.

== Wearing medals by the next of kins ==
An order issued on 11 July 2019 by the Indian Army's "Ceremonial and Welfare Adjutant General's Branch" made it permissible for the close relatives of the deceased military personnel to wear their medals on the right side of chest while attending homage ceremonies at war memorials, cemeteries and funerals. These gallantry or service awards of deceased can be worn by their family members, such as spouses, children, parents, forefathers while wearing civil clothes.

== See also ==
- President's Colour Award
- MacGregor Medal
- Orders, decorations, and medals of India
- Repugnant battle honours of the Indian Army
