= DRDO Anti Tank Missile =

First generation wire-guided missile

The DRDO Anti-Tank Missile is a first generation wire-guided anti-tank guided missile (ATGM) developed in India by Defence Research and Development Laboratory (DRDL), a part of the Defence Research and Development Organisation (DRDO). It has a subsonic speed up to 300 ft/s (91 m/s) with a range of 1.6 km (0.99 mi) and carries a 106 mm high-explosive anti-tank (HEAT) warhead.

== Introduction ==
In 1959, India began a feasibility study on a first generation ATGM. New General Staff Qualitative Requirements (GSQR) were issued and the task of preliminary study and wind testing was assigned to Department of Aeronautics and Institute of Science, Bangalore.

== Development ==
In 1962, DRDO was granted ₹6 lakh (equivalent to ₹5.1 crore or US$530,000 in 2023) to begin work on developing an anti-tank missile due to a conflict with China in Ladakh. It has a range of 500 meters to about 2 km.

After the first aerodynamic design was completed, a full-scale model of the complete configuration was tested in a wind tunnel at Indian Institute of Science (IISc), Bangalore. There, the model was given force and momentum tests which were completed in 1961. Vibrating spoilers were used during these tests to determine control effectiveness. The ATM was designed to have a subsonic flight speed of about 90 m/s (300 ft/s). In 1963, the entire design was reworked to hold a 106 mm HEAT warhead in the nose.

== Propulsion ==
DRDL determined the propulsion motor requirement and designed the propulsion system. The motor was made of aluminium alloy. It had two compartments, one for the sustainer and one for the booster.

Another part of DRDO, the Explosives Research & Development Laboratory (ERDL), made the propellant compositions and also developed the SUK black propulsion grains. Molybdenum inserts were used as sustainer. The booster grain had star type hole for very fast burn and the sustainer was cigarette burning type for constant thrust.

== Control and guidance ==
The actuator and gyroscope were the main components of the control and guidance system of the missile. The actuators were spoiler type, (similar to Mosquito (missile)), which gave a response time of 10 milliseconds with a stay time varying from 80–20 and 20–80 milliseconds. The gyroscope developed for the missile had three degrees freedom.

== Testing ==
The missile was test-fired near Imarat, a village on the outskirts of Hyderabad, India, which held the reliability order of 65%. The test trials were attended by Gen Bewoor, then Deputy Chief of Army Staff of the Indian Army. The missile was tested 16 times and hit its target 14 times. Two Indian army teams which were trained on European ATMs, Cobra and ENTAC, carried out the tests. These test revealed no significant difference between firing the European and indigenous ATMs. Work was still to be done on inhibition of the sustainer motor.

== Termination ==
After waiting for more than 10 years with no results, in 1969 ATM project was terminated as the Indian Army revised its General Staff Qualitative Requirements (GSQR). The new GSQR extended the range of the missile from 1.6 km to 3 km. They also required the formerly man-portable missile to be able to mount and fire from a mobile launcher. This led to production of Nord SS.11B1 at Bharat Dynamics Limited (BDL), Hyderabad under license from France.

== Similar projects ==
- Nag – (India)
- SAMHO – (India)
- MPATGM – (India)
