= Samanya Seva Medal =

Military Award

Samanya Seva Medal 1965
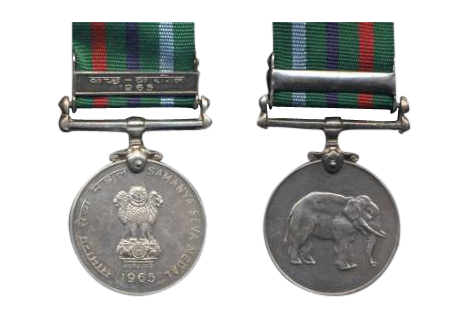
- Type: Military medal Service medal
- Awarded for: Active service in designated operations
- Presented by: India
- Clasps: KUTCH KARGIL 1965; NAGALAND; NATHULA CHOLA; MIZORAM; TIRAP; MANIPUR; DEERGH SAMUDRI SEVA (9 YEARS SAILING)
- Established: 8 May 1975 (retroactive to 26 January 1965)
- Ribbon bar of the medal

Precedence
- Next (higher): General Service Medal
- Next (lower): Special Service Medal

The Samanya Seva Medal 1965 (General Service Medal 1965) is a military service medal of the Indian Armed Forces. Established 8 May 1975, with retroactive effect to 26 January 1965, the Samanya Seva Medal is awarded for active service where no other campaign medal is awarded. Clasps are awarded with the medal designating recognized operations.

== Eligibility ==
The medal is awarded for services rendered with the Armed Forces under active service conditions or conditions akin thereto. Where appropriate, a clasp for each operation shall be instituted by the President of India.

An individual qualifying for the medal for the first time shall be awarded the medal together with a clasp indicating the particular operation for which it is awarded. For all subsequent operations for which the issue of a clasp is approved, only the clasp indicating the particular operation shall be awarded. The bar of the clasp shall have the name or the place of operation engraved on it.

The following categories of personnel serving in an operation or concessional area within the territorial or time limits to be specified separately for each operation will be eligible for the award

- All ranks of the Army, Navy and Air Force, and of the Reserve, Territorial and Militia Forces, and civilians of either sex in all walks of life.
- All other lawfully constituted forces and security forces operating under the operational control of the Regular Armed Forces.

== Design ==
The medal is circular in shape, made of cupro-nickel, 35mm in diameter with the fitting of standard pattern and has embossed on the obverse the State Emblem with its motto and the inscription SAMANYA SEVA MEDAL, 1965, on either side of the State Emblem along the rim. On its reverse it has the representation of the Indian elephant. The riband is in India dark green colour divided into four equal parts in three vertical stripes each three millimetres in width, of red, dark blue and light blue.

== See also ==
- Indian military decorations
