= Siachen Glacier Medal =

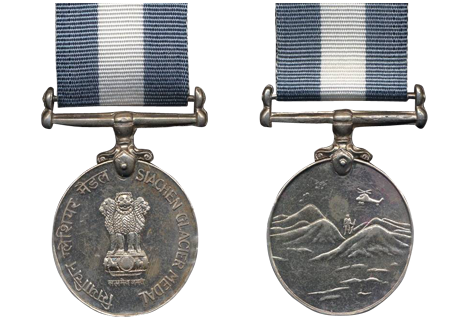
- Medal
- Type: Military medal Service medal
- Awarded for: Active service in designated operations
- Presented by: India
- Clasps: KUTCH KARGIL 1965; NAGALAND; NATHULA CHOLA; MIZORAM; TIRAP; MANIPUR
- Established: 8 May 1975 (retroactive to 26 January 1965)
- Ribbon bar

Precedence
- Next (higher): Operation Vijay Star
- Next (lower): Raksha Medal

The Siachen Glacier Medal is awarded for service in the Siachen conflict along India's northern border with Pakistan. Awarded to the Indian Air Force for Operation Meghdoot, in support of activities in support of troops serving in the Siachen Glacier area since April 1984.

== Appearance ==
The medal is a circular 36-mm cupro-nickel medal. In the center of the obverse is the Emblem of India, surrounded by the legend Siachen Glacier Medal in both Hindi and English. The reverse bears a stylized scene of mountains with a soldier and a helicopter. It is suspended by a non-swiveling straight bar and name of the recipient is impressed on the edge. The ribbon is medium blue, 31 mm (1.2 in) wide, with a white centre stripe 11 mm (0.43 in) in width.

== Eligibility ==
The following personnel are eligible for the medal:

- All ranks of the Army, Navy, Air Force, Territorial Army, and of any other Armed Forces of the Union.
- All ranks of the Railway Protection Forces, Police Forces, Home Guards, Civil Defence Organisations, and civilians under the orders, direction, or supervision of one of the previously mentioned forces.
- All ranks of the Army, and IAF who took part in the initial action to secure Bila Fondla NJ 8888 Siala ND 7011 Indira Col and area North of Base Camp, through vertical envelopment.
- Personnel physically present in the area for a day or night in area North of Base Camp NK 1963 during the period 12–18 April 1984.
- Personnel with a minimum stay of 30 days in the qualifying area. The time spent in captivity, through capture during operations in the area, will count towards the qualifying period.
- All IAF and personnel of AOP and Air maintenance Battalions who have flown at least three operational or maintenance sorties in support of the operation during the period 12–18 April 1984 and then operational or maintenance sorties after 18 April 1984.
- All commanders and staff officers directly responsible for the operation who have done ten visits to the qualifying area.
- All personnel who have earned a gallantry award, were Mentioned in Despatches, died, sustained wounds, or were disabled may be awarded the medal without completing the required time of service.
- All civilian porters who spent a minimum of 30 days in the qualifying area.
