= Operation Vijay Star =

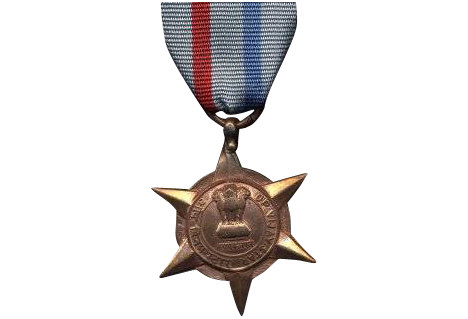
- Medal
- Type: Military medal Service medal
- Awarded for: Active service in designated operations within the battle zone
- Presented by: India
- Eligibility: Members of the Indian Armed Forces, Territorial Army, Para Military Force, Central Police Organisations, and Police Forces
- Campaign: Kargil War
- Established: 2001
- Ribbon Bar

Precedence
- Next (higher): Paschimi Star
- Next (lower): Siachen Glacier Medal
- Related: Operation Vijay Medal

The Operation Vijay Star is a service medal for recognition of Armed Forces personnel and civilians who participated in combat operations during Operation Vijay in 1999. Those personnel who were mobilised but did not serve in the conflict zone were eligible for the Operation Vijay Medal.

== Criteria ==
The medal is awarded to all personnel of the following forces who participated in ‘OP VIJAY’ against the enemy in the area of conflict/operations on the ground, on the sea or in the air as specified. The eligible period of service was from 1 May 1999 to 31 October 1999.

It is awarded in all ranks including ground operations, naval operations and air operations.

== Design ==
The medal is styled and designated the "OP VIJAY STAR" (hereafter referred to as the medal). The medal is in the form of a six-pointed star with beveled rays, made of Tombac bronze, 40 mm across with one point uppermost to which is fitted a ring for the riband. On the obverse in the centre, it has the state emblem with the national motto superimposed and a circular band (2 mm in width and 20 mm in diameter at its outer edges) surrounding the state emblem and broken at the heads of the lions. On this band is inscription OP VIJAY STAR on either side of the State Emblem in raised letters. The reverse of the medal is plain. A sealed pattern of the medal is deposited and kept. The medal is worn suspended from the left breast by a silk riband which is 32 mm in width. The riband is divided into three equal parts of steel grey, with red and light blue stripes of 4 mm each. The ribbon for the Operation Vijay Star was originally established by the Act of the President of India No.116/Pres/01 dated 08/20/2001 as gray (steel–colored), 32 mm wide with two stripes of 4 mm each - red (symbolizes the army) and blue (Indian Air Force). The result of the claims of the Indian Navy command regarding the colors of the Operation Vijay Star combat ribbon was the Act of the President of India No. 98/Pres/03 dated 06/18/2003, which added a four-millimeter dark blue stripe to the Operation Vijay Star ribbon, which made it identical in color (except for twice the width of the stripes) to the ribbon of the Operation Vijay medal.
