= Special Service Medal (India) =

Military Award

- Type: Military medal Service medal
- Awarded for: Minor, short-duration operations
- Presented by: India
- Ribbon bar of the medal

Precedence
- Next (higher): Samanya Seva Medal
- Next (lower): Samar Seva Star

The Special Service Medal is a military service medal of the Indian Armed Forces. The Special Service Medal is awarded under active service conditions for minor operations or operations of short duration. Clasps are awarded with the medal indicating the particular operation for which it is awarded. For subsequent operations where the clasp is approved, only the Clasp denoting the particular operation is awarded. The name of the operation's location is inscribed on the clasp's bar.

It is an octagonal medal, made of copper-nickel alloy. It has a falcon inscribed on the front and the state emblem with the name of the medal inscribed on the back.

== See also ==
- Indian military decorations
