= Samar Seva Star =

Indian medal in recognition of service during the Indo-Pakistani War of 1965

- Type: Military medal Service medal
- Awarded for: For Valour and Courage in Indo-Pak War of 1965
- Country: India
- Presented by: Government of India
- Ribbon
- Obverse: Written in Hindi Samar Seva Star
- Reverse: Awarded to whom (The person's name)
- Established: 11 February 1967

Precedence
- Next (higher): Special Service Medal
- Next (lower): Poorvi Star
- Related: Raksha Medal

The Samar Seva Star is an Indian medal awarded to both Armed Forces personnel and civilians in recognition of service during the Indo-Pakistani War of 1965. The award was established on 11 February 1967.

The “Samar Seva” Star was a collective commemorative award for participation in the 1965 campaign. Military personnel of the Indian Armed Forces (Army, Air Force, Navy), as well as fighters of auxiliary units (Territorial Army, railway guards, and police), were eligible to receive it, provided they met one of the following conditions: — at least 1 day of service directly in the zone of active combat operations on the Indo‑Pakistani border or in Kashmir between 5 August and 22 September 1965 (the period of official escalation from Operation Gibraltar to the ceasefire). — at least 1 day of service in Kutch Rannee on the southern front during the period of escalation from 9 April to 1 July 1965. The star was awarded automatically (without taking into account the accumulated days) to all military personnel who were wounded, concussed, or killed while carrying out combat missions during the specified periods.

== Design ==
=== Medal ===
The Medal is in the form of a five pointed star with bevelled rays, made of tombac bronze, 40 mm across with one point uppermost to which is fitted a ring for the ribbon. On the obverse, in the centre it has the State Emblem superimposed a circular band (2mm in width and 20 mm in diameter at its outer edges) surrounding the State Emblem and boken at the top by the heads of the lions. On this band has the inscription” 1965” in raised letters. The reverse of the medal is plain.

=== Ribbon ===
The ribbon is red, dark blue and light blue in colour, the width of the colour being 12 mm, 8 mm and 12 mm respectively sub-divided into equal parts by 2, 1 and 2 narrow vertical stripes.

== See also ==
- Awards and decorations of the Indian Armed Forces
