= 50th Independence Anniversary Medal =

- Type: Service medal
- Awarded for: All Armed Forces personnel borne on strength on 15 August 1997.
- Presented by: India
- Eligibility: Members of the Indian Armed Forces, Territorial Army, Para Military Forces, Central Police Organisations and other Police Forces
- Established: 1997
- Ribbon bar

Precedence
- Next (higher): 75th Independence Anniversary Medal
- Next (lower): 25th Independence Anniversary Medal

The 50th Independence Anniversary Medal was issued to commemorate the historic occasion of 50 years of the independence of India. and is authorised for all Armed Forces personnel borne on strength as on 15 August 1997.

== Criteria ==
The medal was issued by the Government of India through a Presidential Notification for all personnel of –

a) Armed Forces (the Army, the Navy, the Air Force and other Reserve Forces, Territorial Army and any other armed forces of the Union), and

b) All ranks of the Railway Protection Force, Police Forces, personnel of Central Police Organisations including Para-military Forces, Home Guards, Civil Defence Organisation, Fire Services and any other organisation specified by the Government.

== Design ==
Medal

The medal is circular in shape and made of cupro-nickel. It is 35 mm in diameter and will be fitted to a plain horizontal bar with standard fittings. It shall have embossed on its obverse the Red Fort and the inscriptions 50th Anniversary of Independence and 1947—1997 in English along the rim. On its reverse, it shall have the map of the Union of India in a circle with inscriptions स्वतंत्रता की स्वर्ण जयंती पदक (Golden Jubilee of Independence Medal) and 1947-1997 in Hindi along the rim.

Ribbon

The ribbon will be of silk and of a golden colour background of 10 mm each on either side, with stripes of the National Flag i.e. Saffron, White and Green stripes of 3 mm width in the centre.
