= General Service Medal (India) =

Military Award

General Service Medal 1947
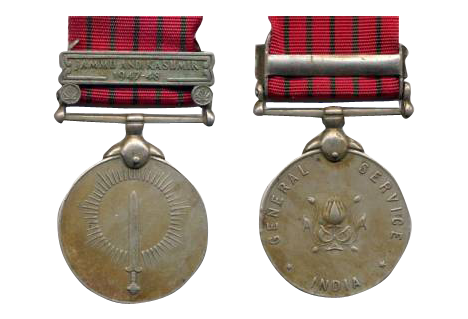
- Type: Military medal Service medal
- Awarded for: Active service in designated operations
- Presented by: India
- Clasps: Jammu and Kashmir 1947-48; Overseas Korea 1950–53; Nagaland; Goa 1961; Ladakh 1962; NEFA 1962; Mizo Hills
- Established: 5 June 1950
- Ribbon bar of the medal

Precedence
- Next (higher): Wound Medal
- Next (lower): Samanya Seva Medal

The General Service Medal 1947 is a military service medal of India, established by the President of India on 5 June 1950. It was awarded for service in Kashmir during the Indo-Pakistani War of 1947, up through service in the Mizo Hills. Eligible operations are denoted by a clasp for each operation.

== Clasps ==
The General Service Medal is awarded with a clasp designating the qualifying service of the recipient. There are seven total clasps for the medal.

Jammu and Kashmir 1947-48
For service in Jammu and Kashmir between 27 October 1947 and 1 January 1949 for those who took part in combat or served an aggregate of 180 days with units or formations operating in or located in specific operational or concessional areas.
Overseas Korea 1950–53
For operational service rendered by personnel who served as part of the 60th (Parachute) Field Ambulance unit in Korea between 22 November 1950 and 8 July 1953.
Nagaland
For 180 days service as part of a detachment, unit, or formation in one of the following operations or areas of operation from 27 April 1955:

- OPG OLI from 27 April 1955 to 1 April 1956.
- Operating during or located under operational command of GOC Assam, 23rd Infantry Division, Operation ORCHID, GOC Nagaland, 8th Mountain Division, or GOC 101 Communication Zone Area.
- For an aggregate of 90 days of service on the active strength of a detachment, unit, or formation operating in the Naga hills and Tuensang area on temporary duty from 27 April 1955 or thereafter.

Goa 1961
For personnel who were part of or attached to formations or units within the geographical limits of the territories of Goa, Daman, and Diu and were involved in the operations, for no less than 48 hours between 18–22 December 1961.
Ladakh 1962
For personnel who rendered 15 days service with units or formations within the geographical limits of Ladakh between 20 October 1962 and 21 November 1962.
NEFA 1962
For service in certain specified areas of North-East Frontier Agency and Assam between 21 September 1962 and 21 November 1962.
Mizo Hills
For personnel who served an aggregate of 180 days as part of a detachment, unit, or formation located within or operated in the Mizo Hills district from 28 February 1966. Those who were temporarily inducted for specific operations need only have served 90 days.

Awards of the Nagaland and Mizo Hills clasps were officially discontinued on 8 May 1975. Recipients of either clasp from 1 January 1968 onwards were to wear them with the ribbon of the Samanya Seva Medal instead of the ribbon of the General Service Medal.

== Appearance ==
The medal is circular, made of cupro-nickel. It hangs from a claw and bar suspension and with clasps attached above the bar. The obverse of the medal depicts the Bhavani Talwar, the sword of Shivaji I, surrounded by a halo. The reverse bears a lotus flower bud in the center with the inscription GENERAL SERVICE INDIA around the edge.

The ribbon of the medal in 31 mm wide, is red with five equidistant 1 mm dark green stripes.

== See also ==
- Indian military decorations
