= Poorvi Star =

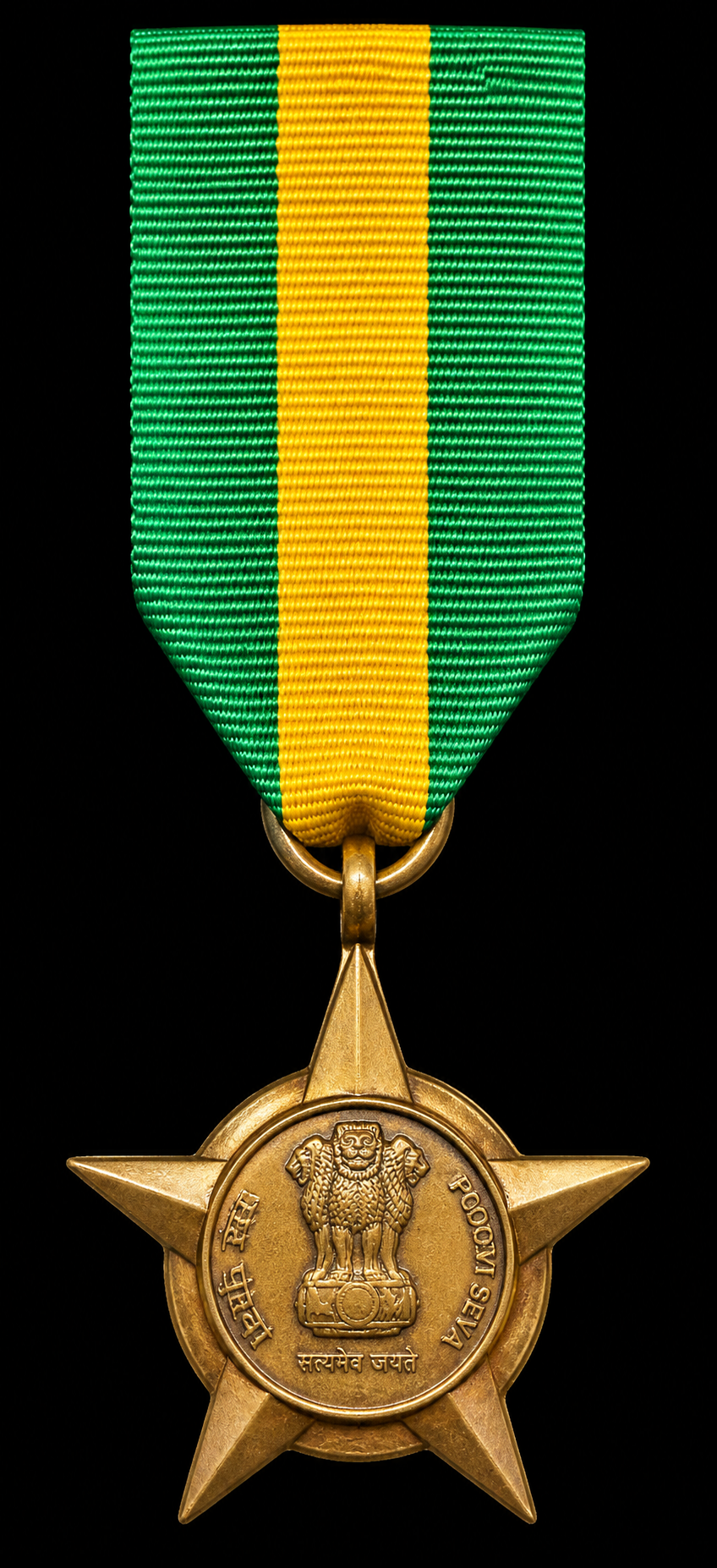
- Poorvi Star Medal
- Type: Military medal Service medal
- Awarded for: Service in operations in and around Bangladesh in 1971
- Presented by: India
- Established: 1973
- Campaign Ribbon

Precedence
- Next (higher): Samar Seva Star
- Next (lower): Paschimi Star
- Related: Sangram Medal

The Poorvi Star is a service medal given to Indian military personnel who served in the eastern border of India in East Pakistan (now Bangladesh) during the Indo-Pakistani War of 1971.

== Criteria ==
This medals was awarded to all Indian Armed Forces personnel who participated in operations against Pakistani forces in and around the erstwhile area East Pakistan.

All ranks of the following organisations were eligible for this award: -

- All ranks of the Indian Armed Forces
- Territorial Army
- J&K Militia
- Railway Protection Force
- Police Force
- Home Guards
- Civil Defence Organisations
- Civilians of either sex serving regularly or temporarily under the orders/directions or supervision of the above-mention Forces.

The medal was not awarded posthumously.

== Appearance ==
Obverse: A six-pointed star-shaped medal in gilt metal, with a circular central medallion bearing the State Emblem of India (Lion Capital of Ashoka) above the inscription “Satyameva Jayate.” Along the circumference of the central disc, the Hindi legend appears on the left and the English inscription “POORVI STAR” on the right, following the curvature. The star’s arms are smooth and tapering, radiating symmetrically behind the central disc. The medal is suspended from a straight bar by a ring and a short triangular suspender.

Reverse: Plain, with a smooth finish (typically without additional design or inscription, except for possible naming on the rim).

Ribbon: 32 mm, dark green, with a broad 16 mm golden-yellow central stripe. Green 8 mm, yellow 16 mm, green 8 mm.
