= 25th Independence Anniversary Medal =

- Type: Service medal
- Awarded for: All Armed Forces personnel borne on strength on 15 August 1972.
- Presented by: India
- Eligibility: Members of the Indian Armed Forces, Territorial Army, Para Military Force, Central Police Organisations and other Police Forces
- Established: 1972
- Ribbon bar

Precedence
- Next (higher): 50th Independence Anniversary Medal
- Next (lower): 30 Years Long Service Medal

The 25th Independence Anniversary Medal was issued to commemorate the historic occasion of 25 years of the independence of India.

== Criteria ==
The medal was issued by the Government of India through a Presidential Notification for all personnel of -

a) Armed Forces (the Army, the Navy, the Air Force, of any other Reserve Forces, Territorial Army, J & K Militia and any other armed forces of the Union), and

b) All ranks of the Railway Protection Force, Police Forces, Home Guards, Civil Defence Organisation and any other organisation specified bv the Government.

== Design ==
Medal

The medal is circular in shape and made of cupro-nickel. It is 35 mm in diameter and will be fitted to a ring. It will have the Lion Capital of Ashoka and the motto on the front. It will have the inscriptions पच्चीसवीं स्वतंत्रता जयंती मेडल (Pachisvi swatantrata jayanti medal) and 25th Independence Anniversary Medal on either side of the State Emblem along the rim.

The reverse of the medal shall be embossed a replica of Ashoka's Chakra in the centre with inscription 1947 above and 1972 below it.

Ribbon

The ribbon will be 32 mm in width and have the colours of national flag i.e. saffron, white and green in equal parts in the centre and of maroon colour of 10 mm each on either side.
