= Raksha Medal =

- Type: Military medal Service medal
- Awarded for: "Conferred upon Military Personnel and Members of the Police and Paramilitary Forces in recognition of service in the Indo-Pakistani War of 1965"
- Country: India
- Presented by: Government of India
- Ribbon
- Obverse: Written in Hindi "Satyamev Jayte"
- Reverse: Rising Sun with written in Hindi "Raksha Medal"
- Established: 26 January 1967

Precedence
- Next (higher): Siachen Glacier Medal
- Next (lower): Sangram Medal
- Related: Samar Seva Star

Raksha Medal was conferred upon Military Personnel and Members of the Police and Paramilitary Forces in recognition of service in the Indo-Pakistani War of 1965.

The Raksha Medal 1965 was awarded to military personnel, police officers, and paramilitary forces in recognition of their services during the Indo‑Pakistani War of 1965.

The Raksha Medal 1965 was established pursuant to Presidential Secretariat Notification No. 14‑Pres / 65 dated 26 January 1967, with amendments made pursuant to Notification No. 73‑Pres / 71 dated 14 December 1971.

The individuals eligible to receive the 1965 Defence Medal of India (Raksha Medal 1965) included all military personnel who had been enlisted in the Indian Armed Forces before 5 August 1965 and had served for 180 days or more, as well as personnel of paramilitary units that were under the operational control of the army and had served for at least 180 days as of 5 August 1965.

The personnel of the paramilitary units that participated in combat operations and were located in areas that qualified for the Samar Seva Star of 1965.

Provided that the 180‑day service requirement was met, the Raksha Medal 1965 was also awarded posthumously.

== Design ==
=== Medal ===
The Medal is circular in shape, made of cupro-nickel, 35mm in diameter. It has embossed on its obverse the State Emblem 22 mm in height. On its reverse it has embossed in the centre the Rising Sun with sprays of laurel below on either side and the inscription embossed above it.

=== Ribbon ===
The Ribbon is orange in colour, divided into four equal parts by three vertical stripes, each 3 mm in width of red, dark blue and light blue. The award may be made posthumously.
