= Sangram Medal =

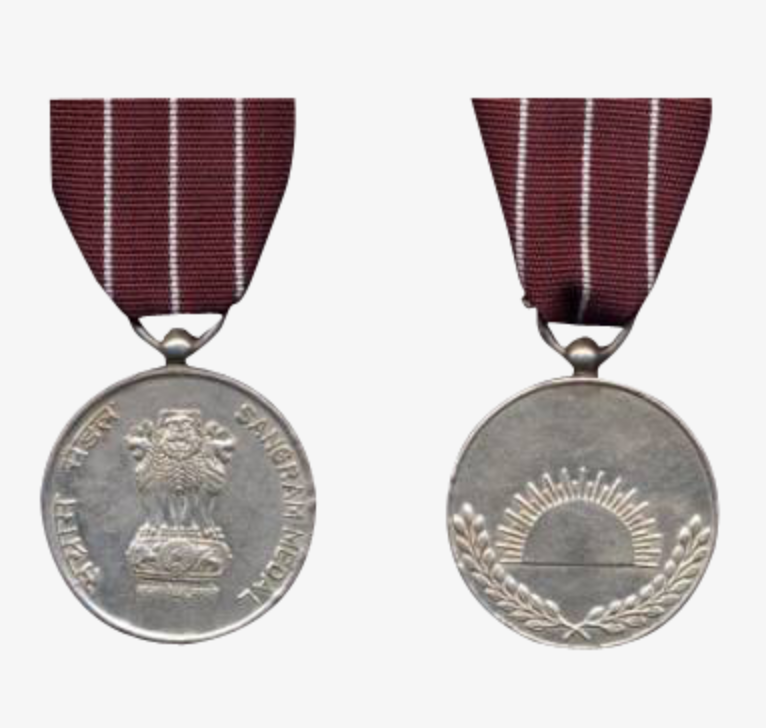
- Awarded to all military, police and civilian personnel who served in the Indo-Pakistani War of 1971
- Type: Military medal Service medal
- Awarded for: Service during 1971 conflict with Pakistan
- Description: 'Sangram Medal'
- Presented by: India
- Campaigns: 1971 War; Bangladesh Liberation War
- Status: No Longer Awarded
- Established: 1973

Precedence
- Next (higher): Raksha Medal
- Next (lower): Operation Vijay Medal
- Related: Poorvi Star; Paschimi Star

The Sangram Medal was awarded for service during the 1971/72 war with Pakistan. Eligibility for being awarded the medal was extended to all categories of personnel who served in the military, paramilitary forces, police, and civilians in service in the operational areas of Jammu and Kashmir, Punjab, Gujarat, Rajasthan, West Bengal, Assam, Meghalaya, Mizoram, or Tripura between 3 December 1971 and 20 December 1972 (both dates inclusive).

Medals awarded to police and paramilitary forces were, in most cases, not officially manufactured and issued, but were, instead, made locally by independent manufacturers. Policemen could either buy them from these shops or the battalions could buy them and give them to the qualifying constables. This gave rise to great variability in manufacture and even in design details. These issues are often observed unnamed, although the official version was normally named on the edge.

== Overview ==
Established: 17 January 1973, by the President of India.

Obverse: Circular 35-mm copper-nickel, the national emblem in the center with the surrounding legend "Sangram Medal [Hindi] / SANGRAM MEDAL". Suspended from a ring suspender. The medal is normally named on the edge.

Reverse: The depiction of a rising sun, with a half-wreath below.

Ribbon: 32 mm, maroon-brown with three 1 mm white stripes. Maroon 7 mm, white 1 mm, maroon 7 mm, white 1 mm, maroon 7 mm, white 1 mm, maroon 7 mm.
