= Paschimi Star =

Pashchimi Star Medal

Pashchimi Star
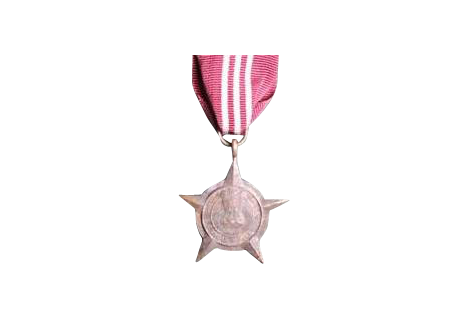
- Pashchimi Star
- Type: Military medal Service medal
- Awarded for: Recognition of the services of Armed Forces personnel and civilians in Indo-Pakistani War of 1971
- Country: India
- Presented by: Republic of India
- Eligibility: All Ranks
- Ribbon
- Established: 17 January 1973

Precedence
- Next (higher): Poorvi Star
- Next (lower): Operation Vijay Star
- Related: Sangram Medal

Pashchimi Star (lit. 'Western Star') was a medal awarded to personnel of the Indian armed forces for participation on the western borders of India (on the ground, on the sea or in the air) during the Indo-Pakistani War of 1971.

The personnel included;
(a) All ranks of the Army, the Navy and the Air Force, of any of the Reserve Forces of the Territorial Army, J&K Militia and of any other armed forces of the Union of India;
(b) All ranks of the Railway Protection Force, Police Force, Home Guards, Civil Defence Organisation, and any other organisation specified by Government;
(c) Civilians of either sex serving regularly or temporarily under the orders/directions or supervision of the above-mentioned Forces.
