= Service medal =

Medal awarded for meritorious service in the military

A service medal is an award to individuals who participated in designated wars, campaigns, or expeditions, or who have fulfilled specific service requirements in a creditable manner. Service medals are sometimes also campaign medals.

== Examples of service medals ==
=== United States ===
Two of the service medals issued by the United States Armed Forces are the National Defense Service Medal (further granting suspended at the end of 2022) and the Global War on Terrorism Service Medal. The National Defense Service Medal is normally issued to anyone who was called to active service during specific time periods. The Global War on Terrorism Service Medal is awarded to any active duty member of the United States military providing support for anti-terrorism operations for 30 consecutive or 60 non-consecutive days unless killed or wounded in the line of duty. The term "support" is interpreted very broadly.

=== India ===
The Special Service Medal is a military service medal of the Indian Armed Forces. The Special Service Medal is awarded under active service conditions for minor operations or operations of short duration. Clasps are awarded with the medal indicating the particular operation for which it is awarded. For subsequent operations where the clasp is approved, only the Clasp denoting the particular operation is awarded. The name of the operation's location is inscribed on the clasp's bar.

== See also ==
- Service Medal of the Order of St John
- Military awards and decorations
