= List of Param Vishisht Seva Medal recipients (2010–2019) =

The Param Vishisht Seva Medal (PVSM) (IAST: Parama Viśiṣṭa Sēvā, lit. 'supreme distinguished service medal') is the highest peacetime medal of the Indian Armed Forces, and is awarded for "distinguished service of the most exceptional order." The medal was instituted on Republic Day 1960 as the highest class of the Vishisht Seva Medal ("Distinguished Service Medal") intended to recognise "distinguished service rendered by personnel of the Armed Forces." All ranks of the Armed Forces are eligible for the medal, which may be awarded multiple times as well as posthumously.

At its creation, it was designated the Vishisht Seva Medal (Class I). On 27 January 1967, it received its present name. Post-nominals for recipients were approved on 19 August 1967.

== Recipients ==
No.	Rank	Name	Branch	Service Number (Unit)	Date of Award
939	Lieutenant General	Narinder Singh Brar AVSM VSM (Ret'd)	Indian Army	IC-23689 (Artillery)	26 January 2010
940	Lieutenant General	Samer Pal Singh Dhillon AVSM VSM (Ret'd)	Indian Army	IC-23791 (Artillery)	26 January 2010
941	Lieutenant General	Prakash Chand Katoch UYSM AVSM SC (Ret'd)	Indian Army	IC-24006 (Infantry)	26 January 2010
942	Lieutenant General	Manbir Singh Dadwal AVSM & bar VSM	Indian Army	IC-24194 (Infantry)	26 January 2010
943	Lieutenant General	Chandroth Kunnumal Suchindra Sabu AVSM VSM	Indian Army	IC-24198 (Artillery)	26 January 2010
944	Lieutenant General	Ajay Kumar Singh Chandele AVSM	Indian Army	IC-24219 (EME)	26 January 2010
945	Lieutenant General	Balraj Singh Nagal AVSM SM	Indian Army	IC-24260 (Infantry)	26 January 2010
946	Lieutenant General	Rakesh Kumar Loomba AVSM	Indian Army	IC-24283 (Armoured Corps)	26 January 2010
947	Lieutenant General	Baljit Singh Jaswal AVSM & bar VSM	Indian Army	IC-24584 (Infantry)	26 January 2010
948	Lieutenant General	Kammula Ramachandra Rao AVSM VSM	Indian Army	IC-24706 (Artillery)	26 January 2010
949	Lieutenant General	Dalip Bhardwaj VSM	Indian Army	IC-25053 (Armoured Corps)	26 January 2010
950	Lieutenant General	Shreedharan Shyam Kumar AVSM SM VSM	Indian Army	IC-25064 (Infantry)	26 January 2010
951	Lieutenant General	Rajinder Singh Sujlana AVSM VSM	Indian Army	IC-25126 (Infantry)	26 January 2010
952	Lieutenant General	Mukesh Sabharwal AVSM & bar VSM	Indian Army	IC-25213 (Infantry)	26 January 2010
953	Lieutenant General	Vinay Sharma SM VSM	Indian Army	IC-25439 (Infantry)	26 January 2010
954	Lieutenant General	Karan Singh Yadava AVSM SM VSM	Indian Army	IC-25469 (Infantry)	26 January 2010
955	Lieutenant General	Vinod Chopra AVSM & bar	Indian Army	IC-29915 (Infantry)	26 January 2010
956	Lieutenant General	Ooman Paul Mathew AVSM SM (Ret'd)	Indian Army	MR-02838 (AMC)	26 January 2010
957	Lieutenant General	Naresh Kumar Parmar AVSM VrC VSM	Indian Army	MR-03364 (AMC)	26 January 2010
958	Vice Admiral	Sanjeev Bhasin AVSM VSM	Indian Navy	01248-K	26 January 2010
959	Vice Admiral	Krishan Nair Sushil AVSM NM	Indian Navy	01369-K	26 January 2010
960	Vice Admiral	Dilip Deshpande AVSM VSM (Ret'd)	Indian Navy	40385-H	26 January 2010
961	Air Marshal	Jyoti Narayan Burma AVSM VSM	Indian Air Force	13219 (ADM)	26 January 2010
962	Air Marshal	Venkataraman Ramamurthy Iyer AVSM	Indian Air Force	12939 F(P)	26 January 2010
963	Air Marshal	Tejbir Singh Randhawa VM	Indian Air Force	12947 F(P)	26 January 2010
964	Air Marshal	Norman Anil Kumar Browne AVSM VM	Indian Air Force	13129 F(P)	26 January 2010
965	Air Marshal	Keshava Murthy Rama Sundara AVSM VSM	Indian Air Force	12833 AE(E)	26 January 2010
966	Air Marshal	Pramod Vasant Athawale AVSM VSM	Indian Air Force	13472 AE(E)	26 January 2010
967	Lieutenant General	Kapileswar Prasad Dhal Samanta AVSM VSM (Ret'd)	Indian Army	IC-23375 (Artillery)	26 January 2011
968	Lieutenant General	Raj Kumar Karwal AVSM SM & bar VSM	Indian Army	IC-24652 (Infantry)	26 January 2011
969	Lieutenant General	Pradeep Khanna AVSM VSM	Indian Army	IC-24656 (Armoured Corps)	26 January 2011
970	Lieutenant General	Prem Krishan Goel AVSM VSM (Ret'd)	Indian Army	IC-24718 (Artillery)	26 January 2011
971	Lieutenant General	Arvinder Singh Lamba AVSM	Indian Army	IC-25066 (Artillery)	26 January 2011
972	Lieutenant General	Vishnu Kant Chaturvedi AVSM SM	Indian Army	IC-25135 (Artillery)	26 January 2011
973	Lieutenant General	Jaswinder Pal Singh AVSM	Indian Army	IC-25156 (Armoured Corps)	26 January 2011
974	Lieutenant General	Gautam Banerjee AVSM YSM	Indian Army	IC-25189 (Engineers)	26 January 2011
975	Lieutenant General	Mahesh Chander Bhadani VSM	Indian Army	IC-25408 (Engineers)	26 January 2011
976	Lieutenant General	Swatantarta Nand Handa AVSM VSM	Indian Army	IC-25442 (Infantry)	26 January 2011
977	Lieutenant General	Partha Mohapatra AVSM	Indian Army	IC-25562 (Signals)	26 January 2011
978	Lieutenant General	Virender Singh Tonk AVSM	Indian Army	IC-25646 (Infantry)	26 January 2011
979	Lieutenant General	Prakash Menon AVSM VSM	Indian Army	IC-27026 (Infantry)	26 January 2011
980	Lieutenant General	Jasbir Singh AVSM VSM	Indian Army	IC-27034 (Infantry)	26 January 2011
981	Lieutenant General	Ballachanda Kuttappa Chengapa AVSM (Ret'd)	Indian Army	IC-32782 (Infantry)	26 January 2011
982	Lieutenant General	Ram Pratap AVSM VSM	Indian Army	IC-32844 (Army Air Defence)	26 January 2011
983	Lieutenant General	Hira Lal Kakria AVSM VSM & bar	Indian Army	MR-03434 (AMC)	26 January 2011
984	Lieutenant General	Devender Paul Vats SM VSM	Indian Army	MR-03831 (AMC)	26 January 2011
985	Lieutenant General	Surrinder Bhushan Sehajpal AVSM VSM	Indian Army	DR-10270 (ADC)	26 January 2011
986	Vice Admiral	Anup Singh AVSM NM	Indian Navy	01424-K	26 January 2011
987	Vice Admiral	Dalip Kumar Dewan AVSM	Indian Navy	01396-Y	26 January 2011
988	Vice Admiral	Devendra Kumar Joshi AVSM YSM NM VSM	Indian Navy	01507-Z	26 January 2011
989	Air Marshal	Nirdosh Vatsyayan Tyagi AVSM VM VSM	Indian Air Force	12765 F(P)	26 January 2011
990	Air Marshal	Sumit Mukerji SC VSM	Indian Air Force	12925 F(P)	26 January 2011
991	Air Marshal	Paramjit Singh Bhangu AVSM VM (Ret'd)	Indian Air Force	12932 F(P)	26 January 2011
992	Air Marshal	Kishan Kumar Nohwar VM	Indian Air Force	13132 F(P)	26 January 2011
993	Air Marshal	Gurdip Singh Kochar AVSM VM	Indian Air Force	13149 F(P)	26 January 2011
994	Air Marshal	Puthiyaveettil Madhusoodanan AVSM VSM (Ret'd)	Indian Air Force	29428 (Medical)	26 January 2011
995	Lieutenant General	Shankar Ranjan Ghosh AVSM SM	Indian Army	IC-25434L (Mechanised Infantry)	26 January 2012
996	Lieutenant General	Vijay Kumar Ahluwalia AVSM & bar YSM VSM	Indian Army	IC-25457M (Artillery)	26 January 2012
997	Lieutenant General	Rabindran Krishna Swamy UYSM AVSM VSM (Ret'd)	Indian Army	IC-25538M (Infantry)	26 January 2012
998	Lieutenant General	Vinod Nayanar AVSM	Indian Army	IC-25544A (Artillery)	26 January 2012
999	Lieutenant General	Dushyant Singh Chauhan AVSM (Ret'd)	Indian Army	IC-25808W (Armoured Corps)	26 January 2012
1000	Lieutenant General	Subramanian Ravi Shankar VSM	Indian Army	IC-25812Y (Engineers)	26 January 2012
1001	Lieutenant General	Gurdeep Singh AVSM VSM	Indian Army	IC-25815M (Artillery)	26 January 2012
1002	Lieutenant General	Bikram Singh UYSM AVSM SM VSM	Indian Army	IC-25816P (Infantry)	26 January 2012
1003	Lieutenant General	Govinda Mohan Nair AVSM SM VSM	Indian Army	IC-25833P (Infantry)	26 January 2012
1004	Lieutenant General	Kaiwalya Trivikram Parnaik UYSM YSM	Indian Army	IC-25901X (Infantry)	26 January 2012
1005	Lieutenant General	Anand Mohan Verma AVSM SM VSM (Ret'd)	Indian Army	IC-27038N (Infantry)	26 January 2012
1006	Lieutenant General	Shri Krishna Singh UYSM AVSM	Indian Army	IC-27203N (Infantry)	26 January 2012
1007	Lieutenant General	Nand Kishore Singh UYSM AVSM VSM	Indian Army	IC-27215H (Infantry)	26 January 2012
1008	Lieutenant General	Rajinder Singh UYSM SM	Indian Army	IC-27258X (Mechanised Infantry)	26 January 2012
1009	Lieutenant General	Ajay Kumar Singh AVSM SM VSM	Indian Army	IC-27606N (Armoured Corps)	26 January 2012
1010	Lieutenant General	Kongara Surendra Nath AVSM VSM	Indian Army	IC-27616X (Mechanised Infantry)	26 January 2012
1011	Lieutenant General	Naresh Chandra Marwah AVSM	Indian Army	IC-27679A (Infantry)	26 January 2012
1012	Lieutenant General	Gopala Krishnan Ramdas SM VSM	Indian Army	MR-03301P (AMC)	26 January 2012
1013	Lieutenant General	Kunwar Karni Singh SM VSM	Indian Army	MR-03449N (AMC)	26 January 2012
1014	Vice Admiral	Shekhar Sinha AVSM NM & bar	Indian Navy	01480-N	26 January 2012
1015	Vice Admiral	Rabinder Kumar Dhowan AVSM YSM	Indian Navy	01563-A	26 January 2012
1016	Vice Admiral	Ganesh Mahadevan AVSM VSM	Indian Navy	50344-T	26 January 2012
1017	Air Marshal	Dhiraj Kukreja AVSM VSM	Indian Air Force	13130 F(P)	26 January 2012
1018	Air Marshal	Ajay Shriniwas Karnik AVSM VM (Ret'd)	Indian Air Force	13140 F(P)	26 January 2012
1019	Air Marshal	Dinesh Chandra Kumaria AVSM VM VSM	Indian Air Force	13366 F(P)	26 January 2012
1020	Air Marshal	Anjan Kumar Gogoi AVSM VSM	Indian Air Force	13382 F(P)	26 January 2012
1021	Air Marshal	Kuzhikombil Joseph Mathews AVSM YSM	Indian Air Force	13393 F(P)	26 January 2012
1022	Air Marshal	Joseph Neri AVSM VSM (Ret'd)	Indian Air Force	13711 AE(E)	26 January 2012
1023	Lieutenant General	Baljeet Singh VSM (Ret'd)	Indian Army	IC-25839W (Artillery)	26 January 2013
1024	Lieutenant General	Balakrishnan Venugopal Nair AVSM	Indian Army	IC-27265N (Artillery)	26 January 2013
1025	Lieutenant General	Ramesh Halagali AVSM SM	Indian Army	IC-27290M (Infantry)	26 January 2013
1026	Lieutenant General	Dalbir Singh Sidhu AVSM VSM (Ret'd)	Indian Army	IC-27701A (Armoured Corps)	26 January 2013
1027	Lieutenant General	Pradeep Bhalla AVSM VSM (Ret'd)	Indian Army	IC-27767W (AOC)	26 January 2013
1028	Lieutenant General	Panemangalore Gopalakrishna Kamath AVSM YSM SM	Indian Army	IC-27782L (Infantry)	26 January 2013
1029	Lieutenant General	Gyan Bhushan UYSM AVSM VSM	Indian Army	IC-27972X (Infantry)	26 January 2013
1030	Lieutenant General	Jatinder Singh Bajwa UYSM SM	Indian Army	IC-27979F (Infantry)	26 January 2013
1031	Lieutenant General	Munish Sibal AVSM & bar	Indian Army	IC-27990A (Infantry)	26 January 2013
1032	Lieutenant General	Palvinder Singh Bhalla AVSM	Indian Army	IC-27994W (Armoured Corps)	26 January 2013
1033	Lieutenant General	Anil Chandra Chait AVSM VSM	Indian Army	IC-30016A (Armoured Corps)	26 January 2013
1034	Lieutenant General	Surendra Pratap Tanwar AVSM (Ret'd)	Indian Army	IC-30068W (Artillery)	26 January 2013
1035	Lieutenant General	Jag Darshan Singh Rawat SM	Indian Army	IC-30085W (Intelligence Corps)	26 January 2012
1036	Lieutenant General	Anjan Mukherjee AVSM	Indian Army	IC-30118W (Artillery)	26 January 2013
1037	Lieutenant General	Syed Ata Hasnain UYSM, AVSM, SM, VSM & bar	Indian Army	IC-30353P (Infantry)	26 January 2013
1038	Lieutenant General	Kuldip Singh AVSM	Indian Army	IC-30516X (Army Air Defence)	26 January 2013
1039	Lieutenant General	Sanjiv Langer AVSM	Indian Army	IC-30687K (Armoured Corps)	26 January 2013
1040	Lieutenant General	Vijai Sharma AVSM	Indian Army	IC-30722F (Engineers)	26 January 2013
1041	Lieutenant General	Gautam Ravindranath SM VSM	Indian Army	MR-03471Y (AMC)	26 January 2013
1042	Vice Admiral	Kannan Bhagavatheswaran AVSM VSM (Ret'd)	Indian Navy	50431-R	26 January 2013
1043	Vice Admiral	Anil Kumar Chopra AVSM	Indian Navy	01627-Y	26 January 2013
1044	Vice Admiral	Satish Soni AVSM NM	Indian Navy	01683-Z	26 January 2013
1045	Air Marshal	Anil Chopra AVSM VM VSM (Ret'd)	Indian Air Force	13368 F(P)	26 January 2013
1046	Air Marshal	Simhakutty Varthaman AVSM VM VSM (Ret'd)	Indian Air Force	13606 F(P)	26 January 2013
1047	Air Marshal	Satish Pal Singh AVSM VM (Ret'd)	Indian Air Force	13770 F(P)	26 January 2013
1048	Air Marshal	Arup Raha AVSM VM	Indian Air Force	13910 F(P)	26 January 2013
1049	Air Marshal	Rajinder Singh AVSM VM	Indian Air Force	13980 F(P)	26 January 2013
1050	Air Marshal	Jagdish Chandra AVSM VSM	Indian Air Force	14613 AE(E)	26 January 2013
1051	Lieutenant General	Narendra Bahadur Singh AVSM VSM	Indian Army	IC-27942A (EME)	26 January 2014
1052	Lieutenant General	Narendra Singh AVSM SM VSM	Indian Army	IC-30089M (Infantry)	26 January 2014
1053	Lieutenant General	Dalbir Singh UYSM AVSM VSM	Indian Army	IC-30351K (Infantry)	26 January 2014
1054	Lieutenant General	Sanjiv Chachra AVSM VSM	Indian Army	IC-30389N (Infantry)	26 January 2014
1055	Lieutenant General	Amarjeet Singh Chhabbewal AVSM YSM	Indian Army	IC-30462F (Armoured Corps)	26 January 2014
1056	Lieutenant General	Vinod Bhatia AVSM SM	Indian Army	IC-30482P (Infantry)	26 January 2014
1057	Lieutenant General	Jai Prakash Nehra AVSM & bar	Indian Army	IC-30503A (Infantry)	26 January 2014
1058	Lieutenant General	Rameshwar Yadav AVSM VSM	Indian Army	IC-30683N (Infantry)	26 January 2014
1059	Lieutenant General	Ashok Kumar Choudhary AVSM & bar, SM, VSM	Indian Army	IC-30708P (Infantry)	26 January 2014
1060	Lieutenant General	Ashok Singh AVSM SM VSM	Indian Army	IC-30723 (Infantry)	26 January 2014
1061	Lieutenant General	Shakti Gurung UYSM AVSM VSM	Indian Army	IC-31052X (Infantry)	26 January 2014
1062	Lieutenant General	Ranbir Singh AVSM SM	Indian Army	IC-31327A (Infantry)	26 January 2014
1063	Lieutenant General	Sanjeev Anand AVSM VSM	Indian Army	IC-31341M (Mechanised Infantry)	26 January 2014
1064	Lieutenant General	Raj Nandan Singh AVSM SM VSM	Indian Army	IC-31351W (Infantry)	26 January 2014
1065	Lieutenant General	Subroto Mitra AVSM SM VSM	Indian Army	IC-31505X (Infantry)	26 January 2014
1066	Lieutenant General	Surendra Hari Kulkarni AVSM, VSM & bar	Indian Army	IC-31521P (Armoured Corps)	26 January 2014
1067	Lieutenant General	Anil Singh Nandal UYSM AVSM SM	Indian Army	IC-36269L (Infantry)	26 January 2014
1068	Lieutenant General	Ajit Singh Narula VSM	Indian Army	MR-03738H (AMC)	26 January 2014
1069	Lieutenant General	Surendra Singh Panwar AVSM SM	Indian Army	MR-04125P (AMC)	26 January 2014
1070	Vice Admiral	Surinder Pal Singh Cheema AVSM NM	Indian Navy	01704-Y	26 January 2014
1071	Vice Admiral	Niranjan Kumar Nadella AVSM VSM	Indian Navy	50445-Y	26 January 2014
1072	Vice Admiral	Pradip Kumar Chatterjee AVSM NM	Indian Navy	01701-R	26 January 2014
1073	Air Marshal	Dhananjay Parashuram Joshi AVSM	Indian Air Force	13905 (Medical)	26 January 2014
1074	Air Marshal	Priya Ranjan Sharma AVSM	Indian Air Force	13927 F(P)	26 January 2014
1075	Air Marshal	Jasvinder Chauhan AVSM VSM	Indian Air Force	14079 F(P)	26 January 2014
1076	Air Marshal	Ravi Kant Sharma AVSM VSM	Indian Air Force	14088 F(P)	26 January 2014
1077	Air Marshal	Pramod Kumar Roy AVSM VM VSM	Indian Air Force	14100 F(P)	26 January 2014
1078	Air Marshal	Daljit Singh AVSM VM	Indian Air Force	14553 F(P)	26 January 2014
1079	Lieutenant General	Rajesh Pant AVSM VSM (Ret'd)	Indian Army	IC-27969X (Signals)	26 January 2015
1080	Lieutenant General	Manvender Singh AVSM VSM	Indian Army	IC-30682L (Infantry)	26 January 2015
1081	Lieutenant General	Philip Campose AVSM & bar, VSM	Indian Army	IC-30702N (Mechanised Infantry)	26 January 2015
1082	Lieutenant General	Vijay Kumar Saxena AVSM VSM	Indian Army	IC-31014F (Army Air Defence)	26 January 2015
1083	Lieutenant General	Gautam Moorthy AVSM VSM (Ret'd)	Indian Army	IC-31134A (AOC)	26 January 2015
1084	Lieutenant General	Sanjeev Madhok AVSM VSM	Indian Army	IC-31323K (Mechanised Infantry)	26 January 2015
1085	Lieutenant General	Kotheneth Surendranath AVSM & bar, SM, VSM	Indian Army	IC-31324M (Armoured Corps)	26 January 2015
1086	Lieutenant General	Sunil Sadanand Jog AVSM SM VSM (Ret'd)	Indian Army	IC-31336F (Infantry)	26 January 2015
1087	Lieutenant General	Rajan Bakshi UYSM	Indian Army	IC-31348W (Armoured Corps)	26 January 2015
1088	Lieutenant General	Om Prakash UYSM AVSM SM	Indian Army	IC-31638N (Infantry)	26 January 2015
1089	Lieutenant General	Nrusingha Prasad Padhi VSM	Indian Army	IC-31642W (Engineers)	26 January 2015
1090	Lieutenant General	Anil Kumar Bhalla AVSM VSM	Indian Army	IC-31653H (Armoured Corps)	26 January 2015
1091	Lieutenant General	Rajiv Bhalla AVSM SM VSM	Indian Army	IC-31736N (Infantry)	26 January 2015
1092	Lieutenant General	Chengali Ananda Krishnan UYSM AVSM	Indian Army	IC-31739F (Infantry)	26 January 2015
1093	Lieutenant General	Peruvemba Ramachandran Kumar AVSM VSM	Indian Army	IC-34036L (Artillery)	26 January 2015
1094	Lieutenant General	Balbir Singh Pama SM VSM (Ret'd)	Indian Army	IC-36200F (Infantry)	26 January 2015
1095	Lieutenant General	Rakesh Chandra Chadha AVSM VSM	Indian Army	IC-36527A (Armoured Corps)	26 January 2015
1096	Lieutenant General	Ved Prakash Chaturvedi VSM	Indian Army	MR-04006Y (AMC)	26 January 2015
1097	Lieutenant General	Vimal Arora AVSM, VSM & bar	Indian Army	DR-10298H (ADC)	26 January 2015
1098	Vice Admiral	Sunil Lanba AVSM	Indian Navy	01823-T	26 January 2015
1099	Vice Admiral	Rama Kant Pattanaik AVSM YSM	Indian Navy	01860-A	26 January 2015
1100	Vice Admiral	Kurumanghat Ramachandran Nair AVSM VSM	Indian Navy	50575-T	26 January 2015
1101	Air Marshal	Rakesh Kumar Jolly VM VSM (Ret'd)	Indian Air Force	14083 F(P)	26 January 2015
1102	Air Marshal	Paramjit Singh Gill AVSM VM (Ret'd)	Indian Air Force	14097 F(P)	26 January 2015
1103	Air Marshal	Subramanya Sukumar AVSM VM	Indian Air Force	14672 F(P)	26 January 2015
1104	Air Marshal	Suneel Shripad Soman AVSM VSM	Indian Air Force	14681 F(P)	26 January 2015
1105	Air Marshal	Arun Purushottam Garud VM	Indian Air Force	14692 F(P)	26 January 2015
1106	Air Marshal	Packiriswamy Kanakaraj AVSM VSM (Ret'd)	Indian Air Force	15066 AE(M)	26 January 2015
1107	Lieutenant General	Arun Kumar Sahni UYSM SM VSM	Indian Army	IC-31633P (Artillery)	26 January 2016
1108	Lieutenant General	Rakesh Nandan AVSM SM	Indian Army	IC-31663M (Army Air Defence)	26 January 2016
1109	Lieutenant General	Man Mohan Singh Rai AVSM VSM	Indian Army	IC-34003A (Engineers)	26 January 2016
1110	Lieutenant General	Amit Sharma AVSM VSM	Indian Army	IC-34014M (Armoured Corps)	26 January 2016
1111	Lieutenant General	Deependra Singh Hooda UYSM , AVSM, VSM & bar	Indian Army	IC-34019L (Infantry)	26 January 2016
1112	Lieutenant General	Harminderjit Singh Sachdev AVSM SM	Indian Army	IC-34098L (Infantry)	26 January 2016
1113	Lieutenant General	Kamaljit Singh AVSM & bar	Indian Army	IC-34350Y (Armoured Corps)	26 January 2016
1114	Lieutenant General	Navkiran Singh Ghei AVSM & bar	Indian Army	IC-34356A (Infantry)	26 January 2016
1115	Lieutenant General	Anil Kumar Ahuja UYSM , AVSM, SM, VSM & bar	Indian Army	IC-34385P (Artillery)	26 January 2016
1116	Lieutenant General	Gurmit Singh UYSM AVSM VSM	Indian Army	IC-34392L (Infantry)	26 January 2016
1117	Lieutenant General	Ravindran Narayan Nair AVSM SM	Indian Army	IC-34396F (Infantry)	26 January 2016
1118	Lieutenant General	Ghanshyam Singh Katoch AVSM VSM	Indian Army	IC-34402K (Infantry)	26 January 2016
1119	Lieutenant General	Gurdeep Singh AVSM	Indian Army	IC-34454A (Infantry)	26 January 2016
1120	Lieutenant General	Ravindra Vasantrao Thodge AVSM SM VSM	Indian Army	IC-34775X (Infantry)	26 January 2016
1121	Lieutenant General	Srinivasan Lakshmi Narsimhan AVSM & bar, VSM	Indian Army	IC-34890X (Infantry)	26 January 2016
1122	Lieutenant General	Nitin Kumar Kohli AVSM VSM	Indian Army	IC-35036X (Signals)	26 January 2016
1123	Lieutenant General	Rakesh Mohan Mittal AVSM SM VSM (Ret'd)	Indian Army	IC-35040A	26 January 2016
1124	Lieutenant General	Kocherlakota Gopala Krishna AVSM SM VSM	Indian Army	IC-35226K (Infantry)	26 January 2016
1125	Lieutenant General	Sanjay Kulkarni AVSM SC SM VSM	Indian Army	IC-37022W (Infantry)	26 January 2016
1126	Lieutenant General	Bhushan Kumar Chopra AVSM	Indian Army	MR-04133N (AMC)	26 January 2016
1127	Vice Admiral	Parasurama Naidu Murugesan AVSM VSM	Indian Navy	01958-Z	26 January 2016
1128	Vice Admiral	Saroj Kumar Jha AVSM NM (Ret'd)	Indian Navy	01866-R	26 January 2016
1129	Vice Admiral	Ashok Vishwanath Subhedar AVSM VSM	Indian Navy	40735-B	26 January 2016
1130	Air Marshal	Jagjeet Singh VSM (Ret'd)	Indian Air Force	14814 AE(E)	26 January 2016
1131	Air Marshal	Herikudru Babu Rajaram AVSM VSM (Ret'd)	Indian Air Force	14939 (ADM)	26 January 2016
1132	Air Marshal	Pochana Prasad Reddy VM (Ret'd)	Indian Air Force	15008 F(P)	26 January 2016
1133	Air Marshal	Kulwant Singh Gill AVSM YSM VM (Ret'd)	Indian Air Force	15220 F(P)	26 January 2016
1134	Air Marshal	Birender Singh Dhanoa AVSM YSM VM	Indian Air Force	15405 F(P)	26 January 2016
1135	Air Marshal	Shirish Baban Deo AVSM VM VSM	Indian Air Force	15681 F(P)	26 January 2016
1136	Lieutenant General	Satya Pal Singh Katewa AVSM	Indian Army	IC-34410H (ASC)	26 January 2017
1137	Lieutenant General	Rakesh Sharma UYSM AVSM VSM	Indian Army	IC-34605N (Infantry)	26 January 2017
1138	Lieutenant General	Praveen Bakshi AVSM VSM	Indian Army	IC-34760P (Armoured Corps)	26 January 2017
1139	Lieutenant General	Sanjiv Talwar AVSM	Indian Army	IC-34829N (Engineers)	26 January 2017
1140	Lieutenant General	Palepu Ravi Shankar AVSM VSM (Ret'd)	Indian Army	IC-34901Y (Artillery)	26 January 2017
1141	Lieutenant General	Amit Sarin AVSM SM VSM	Indian Army	IC-34954X (Army Ordnance Corps)	26 January 2017
1142	Lieutenant General	Rajeev Vasant Kanitkar AVSM SM VSM	Indian Army	IC-35109Y (Armoured Corps)	26 January 2017
1143	Lieutenant General	Jagbir Singh AVSM SM VSM (Ret'd)	Indian Army	IC-35115M (Mechanised Infantry)	26 January 2017
1144	Lieutenant General	Pattiarimal Mohamedali Hariz AVSM SM VSM	Indian Army	IC-35137L (Mechanised Infantry)	26 January 2017
1145	Lieutenant General	Raymond Joseph Noronha AVSM & bar, SM	Indian Army	IC-35173W (Infantry)	26 January 2017
1146	Lieutenant General	Konsam Himalay Singh UYSM AVSM YSM	Indian Army	IC-35206W (Infantry)	26 January 2017
1147	Lieutenant General	Narinder Pal Singh Hira AVSM SM (Ret'd)	Indian Army	IC-35487X (Infantry)	26 January 2017
1148	Lieutenant General	Subrata Saha UYSM, YSM, VSM & bar	Indian Army	IC-35494N (Infantry)	26 January 2017
1149	Lieutenant General	Ashok Bhim Shivane AVSM VSM	Indian Army	IC-35602M (Armoured Corps)	26 January 2017
1150	Lieutenant General	Bobby Cherian Mathews AVSM & bar, VSM	Indian Army	IC-35650M (Infantry)	26 January 2017
1151	Lieutenant General	Rajeev Tewari AVSM	Indian Army	IC-35915L (Armoured Corps)	26 January 2017
1152	Lieutenant General	Avinash Laxman Chavan AVSM SM VSM	Indian Army	IC-35953F (Infantry)	26 January 2017
1153	Lieutenant General	Vinod Gulabrao Khandare AVSM SM	Indian Army	IC-37555Y (Infantry)	26 January 2017
1154	Lieutenant General	Velu Nair AVSM, VSM & bar	Indian Army	MR-03856W (AMC)	26 January 2017
1155	Lieutenant General	Manoj Kumar Unni AVSM VSM	Indian Army	MR-03911F (AMC)	26 January 2017
1156	Vice Admiral	Girish Luthra AVSM VSM	Indian Navy	02011-W	26 January 2017
1157	Vice Admiral	Harish Chandra Singh Bisht AVSM	Indian Navy	02035-Z	26 January 2017
1158	Vice Admiral	Jaywant Kumar Korde AVSM VSM	Indian Navy	01912-W	26 January 2017
1159	Air Marshal	Virender Mohan Khanna AVSM VSM (Ret'd)	Indian Air Force	15071 AE(M)	26 January 2017
1160	Air Marshal	Sunderraman Neelakantan YSM VM	Indian Air Force	15184 F(P)	26 January 2017
1161	Air Marshal	Ravinder Kumar Dhir AVSM VM	Indian Air Force	150678 F(P)	26 January 2017
1162	Air Marshal	Jasbir Walia VM VSM	Indian Air Force	15684 F(P)	26 January 2017
1163	Air Marshal	Bipin Bihari Prasad Sinha AVSM (Ret'd)	Indian Air Force	15748 (ADM)	26 January 2017
1164	Air Marshal	Sreedhara Panicker Radha Krishnan Nair AVSM VM	Indian Air Force	16040 F(P)	26 January 2017
1165	Lieutenant General	Balwant Singh Negi UYSM, YSM, SM, VSM & bar	Indian Army	IC-35479Y (Infantry)	26 January 2018
1166	Lieutenant General	Kanwal Jeet Singh Gill AVSM VSM (Ret'd)	Indian Army	IC-35796A (EME)	26 January 2018
1167	Lieutenant General	Sarath Chand UYSM AVSM VSM	Indian Army	IC-35904Y (Infantry)	26 January 2018
1168	Lieutenant General	Amarjeet Singh AVSM & bar, SM	Indian Army	IC-35919F (Infantry)	26 January 2018
1169	Lieutenant General	Jagbir Singh Cheema AVSM SM (Ret'd)	Indian Army	IC-35923K (Infantry)	26 January 2018
1170	Lieutenant General	Shravan Kumar Patyal UYSM SM	Indian Army	IC-35960X (Infantry)	26 January 2018
1171	Lieutenant General	Rajendra Ramrao Nimbhorkar UYSM, AVSM, SM & bar, VSM	Indian Army	IC-35965W (Infantry)	26 January 2018
1172	Lieutenant General	Dewan Rabindranath Soni VSM	Indian Army	IC-35987P (Armoured Corps)	26 January 2018
1173	Lieutenant General	Satish Kumar Dua UYSM SM VSM	Indian Army	IC-38311X (Infantry)	26 January 2018
1174	Lieutenant General	Devraj Anbu UYSM AVSM YSM SM	Indian Army	IC-38654N (Infantry)	26 January 2018
1175	Lieutenant General	Abhay Krishna UYSM AVSM SM VSM	Indian Army	IC-38679A (Infantry)	26 January 2018
1176	Lieutenant General	Cherish Mathson SM VSM	Indian Army	IC-38722W (Infantry)	26 January 2018
1177	Lieutenant General	Sanjay Kumar Jha AVSM YSM SM	Indian Army	IC-39083M (Infantry)	26 January 2018
1178	Lieutenant General	Gurpratap Singh Dhillon AVSM YSM SM	Indian Army	IC-39098P (Infantry)	26 January 2018
1179	Lieutenant General	Parminder Jit Singh Pannu AVSM VSM	Indian Army	IC-39295X (Infantry)	26 January 2018
1180	Lieutenant General	Suresh Sharma AVSM	Indian Army	IC-39818L (Engineers)	26 January 2018
1181	Lieutenant General	Arup Kumar Das	Indian Army	MR-03992M (AMC)	26 January 2018
1182	Major General	Jatinder Singh Bedi (Ret'd)	Indian Army	IC-38691F (Artillery)	26 January 2018
1183	Major General	Sanjay Thapa	Indian Army	IC-40700W (Artillery)	26 January 2018
1184	Vice Admiral	Abhay Raghunath Karve AVSM	Indian Navy	02118-N	26 January 2018
1185	Vice Admiral	Karambir Singh AVSM	Indian Navy	02151-N	26 January 2018
1186	Vice Admiral	Arun Kumar Bahl AVSM VSM	Indian Navy	50693-K	26 January 2018
1187	Air Marshal	Anil Khosla AVSM VM	Indian Air Force	15871 F(P)	26 January 2018
1188	Air Marshal	Chandrashekharan Hari Kumar AVSM VM VSM	Indian Air Force	15881 F(P)	26 January 2018
1189	Air Marshal	Rakesh Kumar Singh Bhadauria AVSM VM	Indian Air Force	16026 F(P)	26 January 2018
1190	Air Marshal	Shyam Bihari Prasad Sinha AVSM VM	Indian Air Force	16053 F(P)	26 January 2018
1191	Air Marshal	Mahesh Kumar Malik AVSM VSM (Ret'd)	Indian Air Force	15743 (ADM)	26 January 2018
1192	Air Marshal	Pankaj Aneja VSM	Indian Air Force	15975 AE(M)	26 January 2018
1193	General	Bipin Rawat UYSM AVSM YSM SM VSM	Indian Army	IC-35471M (Infantry)	26 January 2019
1194	Lieutenant General	Pankaj Kumar Srivastava AVSM VSM	Indian Army	IC-38011W (Artillery)	26 January 2019
1195	Lieutenant General	Surinder Singh AVSM & bar, VSM	Indian Army	IC-38266W (Mechanised Infantry)	26 January 2019
1196	Lieutenant General	Shokin Chauhan AVSM YSM SM VSM (Ret'd)	Indian Army	IC-38403K (Infantry)	26 January 2019
1197	Lieutenant General	Ranbir Singh Salaria VSM	Indian Army	IC-38643F (Artillery)	26 January 2019
1198	Lieutenant General	Ashok Ambre AVSM & bar, SM	Indian Army	IC-38708K (Infantry)	26 January 2019
1199	Lieutenant General	Manoj Mukund Naravane AVSM SM VSM	Indian Army	IC-38750H (Infantry)	26 January 2019
1200	Lieutenant General	Jaswinder Singh Sandhu UYSM AVSM VSM	Indian Army	IC-38753W (Infantry)	26 January 2019
1201	Lieutenant General	Ashwani Kumar AVSM VSM	Indian Army	IC-38879W (Army Air Defence)	26 January 2019
1202	Lieutenant General	Pattacheravanda Chengappa Thimmaya VSM	Indian Army	IC-39438M (Mechanised Infantry)	26 January 2019
1203	Lieutenant General	Sudarshan Shrikant Hasabnis VSM	Indian Army	IC-39445H (Engineers)	26 January 2019
1204	Lieutenant General	Harish Thukral SM	Indian Army	IC-39590A (Infantry)	26 January 2019
1205	Lieutenant General	Iqroop Singh Ghuman AVSM	Indian Army	IC-39607A (Mechanised Infantry)	26 January 2019
1206	Lieutenant General	Michael Mathews VSM & bar	Indian Army	IC-39865H (Engineers)	26 January 2019
1207	Lieutenant General	Dushyant Singh AVSM	Indian Army	IC-40098F (Infantry)	26 January 2019
1208	Lieutenant General	Bipin Puri VSM	Indian Army	MR-03993P (AMC)	26 January 2019
1209	Major General	Vijay Dnayandev Chowgule VSM	Indian Army	IC-37934P (Infantry)	26 January 2019
1210	Major General	Bollina Venkata Rao VSM	Indian Army	IC-40378P (Engineers)	26 January 2019
1211	Major General	Dev Arvind Chaturvedi AVSM SM	Indian Army	IC-40792N (Infantry)	26 January 2019
1212	Vice Admiral	Ajit Kumar Payyapillil AVSM VSM	Indian Navy	02275-W	26 January 2019
1213	Vice Admiral	Gurtej Singh Pabby AVSM VSM	Indian Navy	40869-H	26 January 2019
1214	Vice Admiral	Ajay Kumar Saxena AVSM VSM	Indian Navy	50763-W	26 January 2019
1215	Air Marshal	Hemant Sharma AVSM VSM	Indian Air Force	15941 AE(E)	26 January 2019
1216	Air Marshal	Sardar Harpal Singh AVSM VM	Indian Air Force	16071 F(P)	26 January 2019
1217	Air Marshal	Balakrishnan Suresh AVSM VM	Indian Air Force	16206 F(P)	26 January 2019
1218	Air Marshal	Raghunath Nambiar AVSM, VM & bar	Indian Air Force	16378 F(P)	26 January 2019
1219	Air Marshal	Pandurang Narayan Pradhan AVSM (Ret'd)	Indian Air Force	16403 F(P)	26 January 2019
1220	Air Marshal	Hemant Narayan Bhagwat AVSM VM (Ret'd)	Indian Air Force	16423 (ADM)	26 January 2019

== See also ==
- List of Param Vishisht Seva Medal recipients (1960–1969)
- List of Param Vishisht Seva Medal recipients (1970–1979)
- List of Param Vishisht Seva Medal recipients (1980–1989)
- List of Param Vishisht Seva Medal recipients (1990–1999)
- List of Param Vishisht Seva Medal recipients (2000–2009)
- List of Param Vishisht Seva Medal recipients (2020–2029)
