= Ajae Kumar Sharma =

Indian Army officer

Lieutenant General Ajae Kumar Sharma UYSM, YSM, SM
- Military career
- Allegiance: India
- Branch: Indian Army
- Service years: 1980–present
- Rank: Lieutenant General
- Service number: IC-39185H
- Unit: 2 Sikh Regiment
- Commands: XVI Corps
- Conflicts: Operation Parakram
- Awards: Uttam Yudh Seva Medal; Yudh Seva Medal; Sena Medal

Lieutenant General Ajae Kumar Sharma, UYSM, YSM, SM was the former Commander, XVI Corps of the Indian Army and served from 9 October 2016 till 10 October 2017. He assumed the post from Lt General Rajendra Ramrao Nimbhorkar and succeeded was Lt General succeeded by Saranjeet Singh.

== Early life and education ==
Sharma is an alumnus of Defence Services Staff College, Wellington; Army War College, Mhow; National Defence College, New Delhi. He has also attended a terrorism and security studies course in Germany.

== Career ==
Sharma was commissioned into 2 Sikh Regiment in 1980. He has commanded 2 Sikh battalion during Operation Parakram; a mountain brigade in Northeast India; an infantry brigade group during UN Mission in Congo and a counter Iinsurgency force in Jammu and Kashmir.

During his career, he has been awarded the Uttam Yudh Seva Medal (2018), Yudh Seva Medal and Sena Medal for his service.

== Honours and decorations ==

Uttam Yudh Seva Medal		Yudh Seva Medal	
Sena Medal	Special Service Medal		Operation Vijay Medal
Operation Parakram Medal	Sainya Seva Medal	Videsh Seva Medal	50th Anniversary of Independence Medal
30 Years Long Service Medal	20 Years Long Service Medal	9 Years Long Service Medal	MONUSCO

Military offices
Preceded by Rajendra Ramrao Nimbhorkar	General Officer Commanding XVI Corps; 9 October 2016 – 10 October 2017	Succeeded by Saranjeet Singh
