= Alok Singh Kler =

Indian general

Lieutenant General Alok Kler PVSM, VSM, ADC
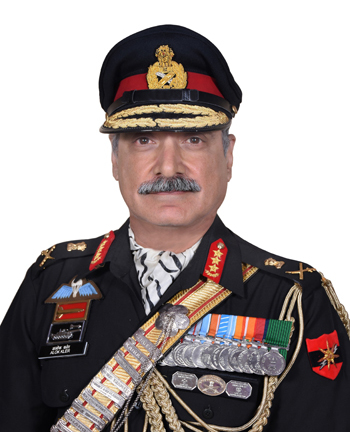
- Military career
- Allegiance: India
- Branch: Indian Army
- Service years: June 1982 – 2021
- Rank: Lieutenant General
- Service number: IC-40293Y
- Unit: 68th Armoured Regiment
- Commands: South Western Army; II Corps
- Awards: Param Vishisht Seva Medal; Vishisht Seva Medal

Lieutenant General Alok Singh Kler, PVSM, VSM, ADC is a retired General Officer in the Indian Army who last served as General Officer-Commanding-in-Chief of the South Western Command. He assumed office on 1 September 2019, taking over from Lt Gen Cherish Mathson.

== Early life and education ==
Alok was born into the Kler military family which originated from Sarhal Qazian nawashar then moved to Kakrala Kalan near Ludhiana, Punjab, India. The family has over 300 years of service in the Indian Armed Forces. His father, Lt Gen Gurdev Singh Kler was Mentioned in dispatches (MiD) in Sialkot in Indo-Pakistani War of 1965 fighting with 18th Cavalry. Commanding 56 Brigade, he was awarded the Ati Vishisht Seva Medal (AVSM) for capturing the largest group of armed insurgents in Nagaland in the 1970s. Commanding an armoured brigade and division, he was Director General of Military Training (DGMT) and commanded the Armoured Corps Centre and School in Ahmednagar, Maharashtra before retiring as a Lieutenant General.

His elder brother, Jasjit Singh Kler was in the Indian Air Force. He served as the Commandant of the National Defence Academy before retiring as an Air Marshal. His Uncle, Gen Hardev Singh Kler was awarded the Mahavir Chakra in the Indo-Pakistani War of 1971 for commanding 95 Brigade. His formation was among the first to enter Dhaka. Alok's father-in-law, Brigadier Narinder Singh Sandhu saw action in both the wars of 1965 and 1971 and was awarded the Mahavir Chakra. Alok attended Mayo College, Ajmer before graduating from the National Defence Academy and the Indian Military Academy.

== Career ==
Kler was commissioned into 68 Armoured Regiment in June 1982. He has attended Defence Services Staff College at Wellington, the Battalion Commander Combat Course at Germany, the Higher Command Course at Army War College, Mhow, and the National Defence College at Bangladesh.

Kler commanded an Armoured regiment, an Armoured Brigade in the western sector and the same Armoured Division which was commanded by his father. He later commanded the Strike Corps (II Corps) in the Western theatre. He has also held important staff positions like the Chief of Staff of Army Training Command (ARTRAC). He later served as the Director General Military Training (DGMT). He has been awarded the Vishisht Seva Medal in 2015 and a COAS Commendation card in 2009.

Kler has a keen interest in cycling, fitness and sports. He made news when he cycled 270 km from Delhi to Jaipur to take command of the South Western Command. As an Army Commander, he was entitled to fly down to his headquarters or drive down in a cavalcade of military vehicles.

“Cycling is a terrific workout and I am passionate about it. I believe fitness should be a personal mission and not imposed by the organisation. It sends a message of fitness to the men under my command and others too,” said Gen Kler.

He also carried out a para jump, after taking over the South Western Command. He jumped out an ALH Dhruv helicopter on 25 October. He had earlier, as the DGMT, carried out a para jump Nasik by service aircraft from 10,000-12,000 feet.

Kler retired from the Army on 31 March 2021.

== Awards and decorations ==

Param Vishisht Seva Medal		Vishisht Seva Medal	
Samanya Seva Medal	Special Service Medal		Operation Vijay Medal
Operation Parakram Medal	Sainya Seva Medal	High Altitude Service Medal	Videsh Seva Medal
50th Anniversary of Independence Medal	30 Years Long Service Medal	20 Years Long Service Medal	9 Years Long Service Medal

== Dates of rank ==
Insignia	Rank	Component	Date of rank
	Second Lieutenant	Indian Army	12 June 1982
	Lieutenant	Indian Army	12 June 1984
	Captain	Indian Army	12 June 1987
	Major	Indian Army	12 June 1993
	Lieutenant-Colonel	Indian Army	16 December 2004
	Colonel	Indian Army	1 March 2006
	Brigadier	Indian Army	1 January 2010 (substantive, with seniority from 7 January 2009)
	Major General	Indian Army	12 December 2014 (substantive, with seniority from 3 June 2012)
	Lieutenant-General	Indian Army	20 May 2017 (with seniority from 1 May 2017)

Military offices
Preceded by Cherish Mathson	General Officer-Commanding-in-Chief South Western Command; 1 September 2019 – 31 March 2021	Succeeded by Amardeep Singh Bhinder
Preceded by Jaiveer Singh Negi	General Officer Commanding II Corps; 2018 - 2019	Succeeded by Manmohan Jeet Singh Kahlon
