= Narinder Singh Sandhu =

Indian Army officer (1932–2018)

Brigadier Narinder Singh Sandhu MVC
- Narinder Singh Sandhu MVC
- Born: 1 September 1932; Narli, Amritsar, Punjab, British India
- Died: 30 March 2018 (aged 85); Chandigarh, India
- Military career
- Allegiance: Republic of India
- Branch: Indian Army
- Service years: 1953–
- Rank: Brigadier
- Units: 3rd Cavalry Regiment; 65th Armoured Regiment; Dogra Regiment
- Commands: 10th Battalion, Dogra Regiment
- Conflicts: Indo-Pakistani War of 1965; Indo-Pakistan War of 1971
- Awards: Maha Vir Chakra; Mention in dispatches

Brigadier Narinder Singh Sandhu MVC (1 September 1932 – 30 March 2018) was an Indian Army officer who was awarded the Maha Vir Chakra (MVC), the second-highest Indian military decoration, for gallantry, leadership and devotion to duty during the Indo-Pakistan War of 1971. Sandhu was commissioned into the Indian Army Armoured Corps in 1953, and participated in the Battle of Asal Uttar during the Indo-Pakistani War of 1965, and was mentioned in dispatches. He transferred to the Dogra Regiment in 1970, and it was for his performance as commanding officer of the 10th Battalion, Dogra Regiment during an assault on a fortified Pakistan Army position that he was awarded the MVC. He retired as a brigadier and was active in veterans' and gallantry award recipients' matters until his death of colorectal cancer in 2018.

== Early life and family ==
Narinder Singh Sandhu was born on 1 September 1932 at Narli, Amritsar, in the British province of Punjab, the son of Shri Hari Singh. His grandfather, Thakur Singh, was a major in the British Indian Army in World War I during which he was awarded the Military Cross for gallantry; he was subsequently made an Officer of the Most Excellent Order of the British Empire. He attended Khalsa College, Amritsar. His wife's name was Harinder, and they had two children: a son, Sandeep; and a daughter, Mandeep; both were born in 1965. Mandeep married Lieutenant General Alok Singh Kler. Sandhu's uncle and younger brother also served with distinction in the Indian Army.

== Career ==
Sandhu was commissioned into the Indian Army Armoured Corps on 13 December 1953. He served with the 3rd Cavalry Regiment and the 65th Armoured Regiment. He served in the Khemkaran sector during the Indo-Pakistani War of 1965, during which he participated in the Battle of Asal Uttar on 8–10 September 1965, and his unit was responsible for destroying several Pakistani M47 Patton tanks for which he was mentioned in dispatches. He transferred to the Dogra Regiment in 1970.

At the time of the Indo-Pakistan War of 1971, he held the rank of lieutenant colonel, commanding the 10th Battalion, Dogra Regiment. As part of Operation Cactus-Lilly, his battalion was tasked to capture an enemy position in the Western Sector, which was located at the eastern end of a bridge over the Ravi River at Dera Baba Nanak. Control of the bridge was considered strategically important because it enabled the Pakistan Army to launch an offensive into India, potentially threatening Pathankot, Beas City and Amritsar.

The Pakistan Army had extensively fortified the position with a network of bunkers that were connected by tunnels, and contained machine guns and anti-tank weapons, and it was strongly held. At 17:30 on 5 December 1971, Sandhu led about 420 men of his battalion in the assault, initially mounted on 21 tanks. The tanks became bogged in the marshes along the Ravi River, so they dismounted and made the remaining 5 km (3.1 mi) to the bridge on foot. Surprising the defenders with a charge from 15 m (49 ft), the Indian troops shouted the battle cry "Durga Mata Ki Jai", invoking the Hindu goddess of war, Durga. Sandhu led the assault with "grim determination", and without regard for his own safety, and the assault resulted in fierce fighting during which Sandhu fought from bunker to bunker, and was wounded in the leg. Once the position was captured, he then reorganised his troops despite his wound. During the assault the 10th Battalion suffered five killed and ten wounded; 22 Pakistani defenders were killed and 14 were captured. A large quantity of weapons and ammunition was also captured by the Indians.

For his actions during this operation, Sandhu was commended by the Indian government for his gallantry, leadership and devotion to duty. He was awarded the Maha Vir Chakra, the second-highest award for gallantry available to members of the Indian Armed Forces. The award was promulgated on Independence Day in 1972.

Sandhu later served as the Deputy Director General of the Punjab, Haryana, Himachal Pradesh and Chandigarh National Cadet Corps Directorate. He retired from the army as a brigadier, and after retirement was active in veterans' and gallantry award recipients' matters. He died of colon cancer on 30 March 2018, aged 85 in Chandigarh. A contingent from the 3rd Cavalry and Dogra Regiments formed a ceremonial guard at his funeral, which was also attended by several senior military officers.
