= XVI Corps (India) =

Military field formation of the Indian Army

- Indian Army XVI Corps Formation Sign
- Active: 1972 – present
- Country: India
- Branch: Indian Army
- Size: Corps
- Part of: Northern Command
- Garrison/HQ: Nagrota
- Nickname: White Knight Corps

Commanders
- Current commander: Lt Gen Mohit Seth, SM VSM**

The XVI Corps, or the White Knight Corps, is an army corps of the Indian Army raised on 1 June 1972 with Lieutenant General J F R Jacob as its first General Officer Commanding (GOC). It has its headquarters at Nagrota Cantonment, (Jammu district), Jammu and Kashmir in the disputed Kashmir region. In 2005, IX Corps was raised in southern part of the XVI Corps' area, taking over two of its divisions.

== Order of battle ==
The corps is reported to include

- 10th Infantry Division (RAPID) (Crossed Swords Division), headquartered at Akhnoor
- 25 Infantry Division (Ace of Spades Division), headquartered at Rajouri
- 39 Infantry Division (Dah Division), headquartered at Palampur, Himachal Pradesh
- One Bhairav Battalion
- Delta Force and Romeo Force of the Rashtriya Rifles come under the operational control of the corps.

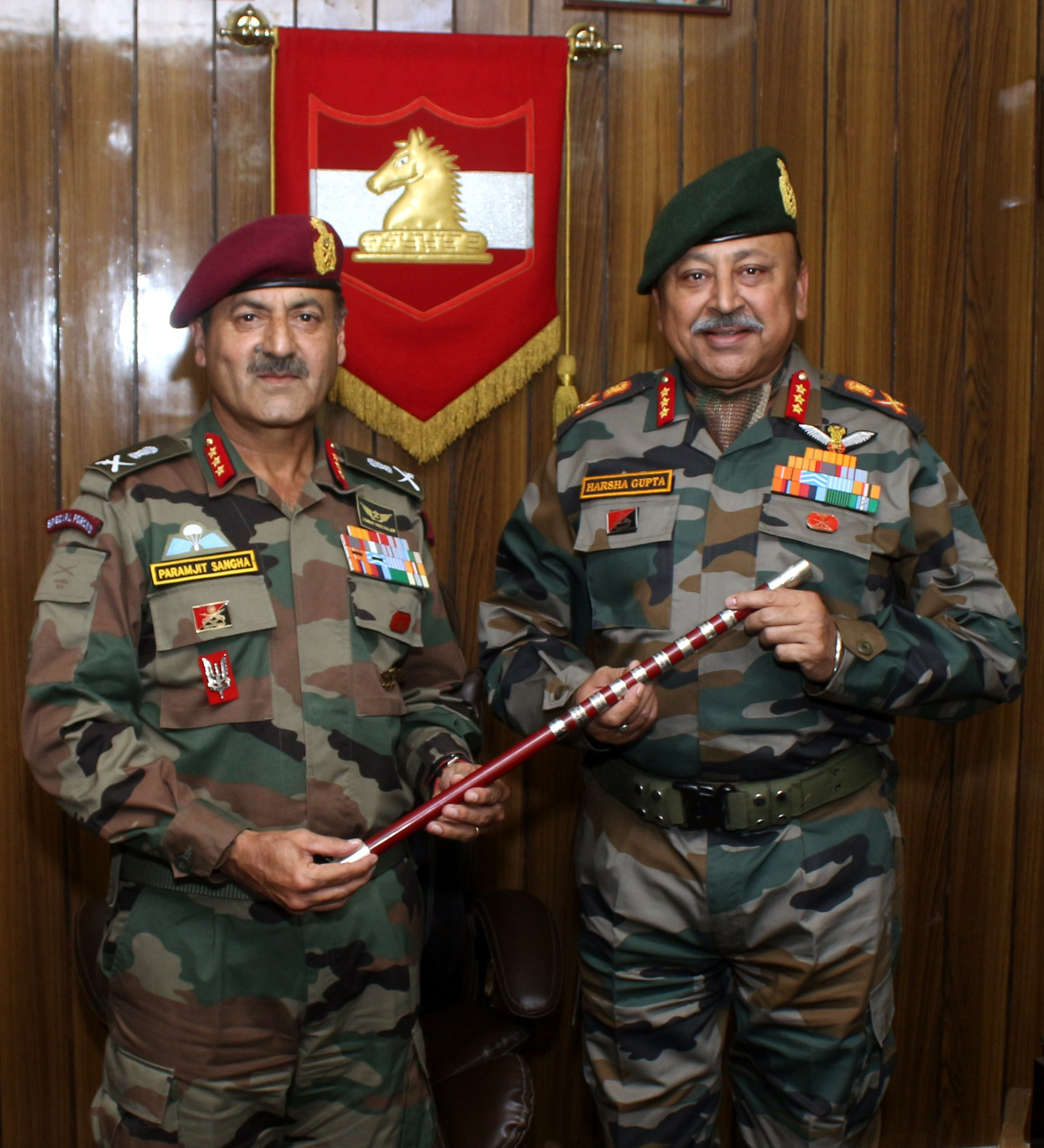
Lt Gen Harsha Gupta assuming command of White Knight Corps (16 Corps) from Lt Gen Paramjit Singh Sangha, on 12 Oct 2019.

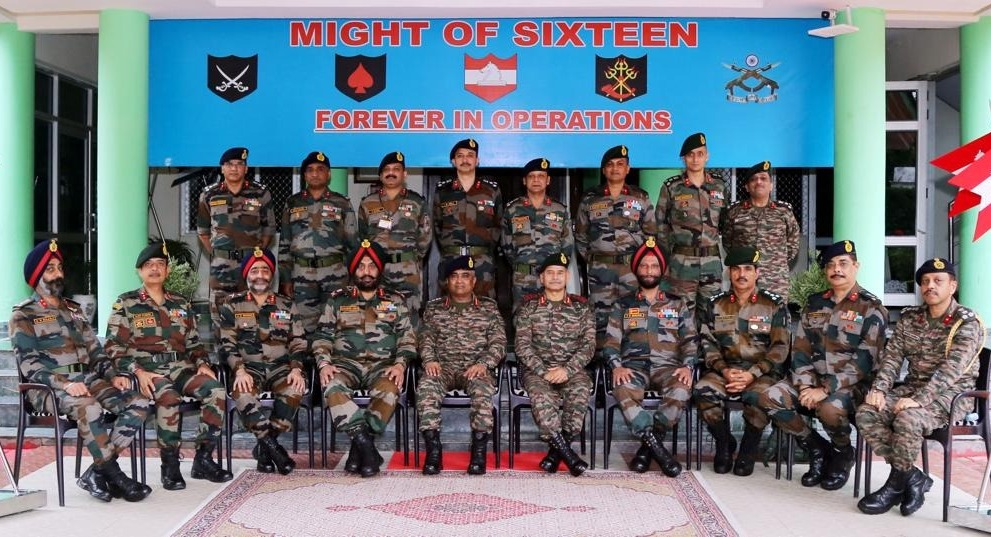
General Manoj Pande, COAS, visiting 16 Corps, August 2022.

== List of commanders ==
Rank	Name	Appointment date	Left office	Unit of commission	References
Lieutenant General	J F R Jacob	17 June 1972	23 July 1974	Regiment of Artillery	
Lieutenant General	K V Krishna Rao	24 July 1974	15 March 1978	Mahar Regiment	
Lieutenant General	D K Chandorkar	20 March 1978	30 June 1979	Rajputana Rifles	
Lieutenant General	K Chiman Singh	01 July 1979	29 July 1981	Rajputana Rifles	
Lieutenant General	A K Handoo	30 July 1981	09 March 1983	Brigade of Guards	
Lieutenant General	K K Hazari	10 May 1983	25 September 1985	Regiment of Artillery	
Lieutenant General	M Mayadas	26 September 1985	27 October 1986	5th Armoured Regiment	
Lieutenant General	Sunith Francis Rodrigues	28 October 1986	31 October 1987	Regiment of Artillery	
Lieutenant General	Vijay Singh	01 November 1987	14 October 1989		
Lieutenant General	Harwant Singh	15 October 1989	25 September 1991	62 Cavalry	
Lieutenant General	Shankar Roychowdhury	26 September 1991	15 August 1992	20 Lancers	
Lieutenant General	H S Bedi	31 August 1992	08 May 1994	Dogra Regiment	
Lieutenant General	Manjit Singh Bhullar	09 May 1994	23 January 1997	Sikh Regiment	
Lieutenant General	D S Chauhan	24 January 1997	30 January 1999	Madras Regiment	
Lieutenant General	Arjun Singh Khanna	31 January 1999	31 March 2001	Regiment of Artillery	
Lieutenant General	J.B.S. Yadava	01 April 2001	19 August 2002	11th Gorkha Rifles	
Lieutenant General	T P S Brar	20 August 2002	17 November 2003	Maratha Light Infantry	
Lieutenant General	Ashok Kapur	18 November 2003	04 December 2004	Sikh Light Infantry	
Lieutenant General	Sudhir Sharma	05 December 2004	20 April 2006	Brigade of Guards	
Lieutenant General	T K Sapru	02 May 2006	31 October 2007	4th Gorkha Rifles	
Lieutenant General	R K Karwal	01 November 2007	17 October 2008	Rajput Regiment	
Lieutenant General	R K Swamy	18 October 2008	16 October 2009	Mahar Regiment	
Lieutenant General	Romeshwar Roy	17 October 2009	04 December 2010	Jammu and Kashmir Rifles	
Lieutenant General	Jai Prakash Nehra	10 December 2010	01 November 2011	Madras Regiment	
Lieutenant General	A S Nandal	02 November 2011	04 October 2012	5th Gorkha Rifles	
Lieutenant General	Deependra Singh Hooda	05 October 2012	16 April 2014	4th Gorkha Rifles	
Lieutenant General	Konsam Himalay Singh	17 April 2014	23 July 2015	Rajput Regiment	
Lieutenant General	Rajendra Ramrao Nimbhorkar	24 July 2015	08 October 2016	Punjab Regiment	
Lieutenant General	Ajae Kumar Sharma	09 October 2016	10 October 2017	Sikh Regiment	
Lieutenant General	Saranjeet Singh	11 October 2017	11 October 2018	Sikh Light Infantry	
Lieutenant General	Paramjit Singh Sangha	12 October 2018	12 October 2019	Parachute Regiment	
Lieutenant General	Harsha Gupta	13 October 2019	13 October 2020	Sikh Light Infantry	
Lieutenant General	M. V. Suchindra Kumar	14 October 2020	28 October 2021	Assam Regiment	
Lieutenant General	Manjinder Singh	29 October 2021	23 December 2022	Madras Regiment	
Lieutenant General	Sandeep Jain	24 December 2022	31 December 2023	Mahar Regiment	
Lieutenant General	Navin Sachdeva	01 January 2024	31 March 2025	Garhwal Rifles	
Lieutenant General	Prasanna Kishore Mishra	01 April 2025	30 September 2026	Jammu and Kashmir Light Infantry	
Lieutenant General	Mohit Seth	01 October 2026	Incumbent	Madras Regiment	
