= XIV Corps (India) =

- Indian Army XIV Corps Formation Sign
- Active: 1999 – present
- Country: India
- Branch: Indian Army
- Role: Holding Corps
- Part of: Northern Command
- Garrison/HQ: Leh
- Nicknames: Fire and Fury Corps
- Anniversaries: 1 September

Commanders
- Current commander: Lt Gen Madanraj Pande
- Notable commanders: Lt Gen Anindya Sengupta; Lt Gen Yogesh Kumar Joshi; Lt Gen Balwant Singh Negi; Lt Gen Shri Krishna Singh; Lt Gen Prabodh Chandra Bhardwaj

The XIV Corps or The Fire and Fury Corps is a corps of the Indian Army in the disputed Kashmir region. It is the Army's Udhampur-based part of the Northern Command. The 14th Corps forms a military deployment in the Kargil-Leh area guarding the frontiers with China and Pakistan. It also guards the Siachen Glacier.

== History ==
The 3rd Division was established in 1962 during the Sino-Indian War, from elements of HQ Nagaland and remained as an Eastern Command reserve, even though it almost always remained on CI duty. After nearly 30 years existence in the East, the division left the area about two decades ago for Ladakh and never returned. While on CI duty, the division was pulled out and sent to fight suspected Pakistani infiltrators in the Matayan-Dras sectors. Afterwards, when HQ XIV Corps was raised, it took over the 3rd and 8th Division.

During the Kargil War it consisted of 56th Mountain Brigade, usually stationed at Matayan, 79th Mountain Brigade, usually stationed at Dras, and 192nd Mountain Brigade.

The Changthang Prahar Exercise, an Integrated Exercise of all Arms in Super High Altitude Area, was conducted in September 2019.

During the Sino-Indian Border Dispute, the XIV Corps engaged in discussions with Chinese division commanders regarding the Depsang bulge standoff in eastern Ladakh. Despite multiple diplomatic talks and Corps Commander-level negotiations, Chinese troops obstructed access to critical patrolling points, prompting the Indian Army to prepare for a prolonged presence, including winter stocking of troops along the Line of Actual Control (LAC).

== Order of battle ==
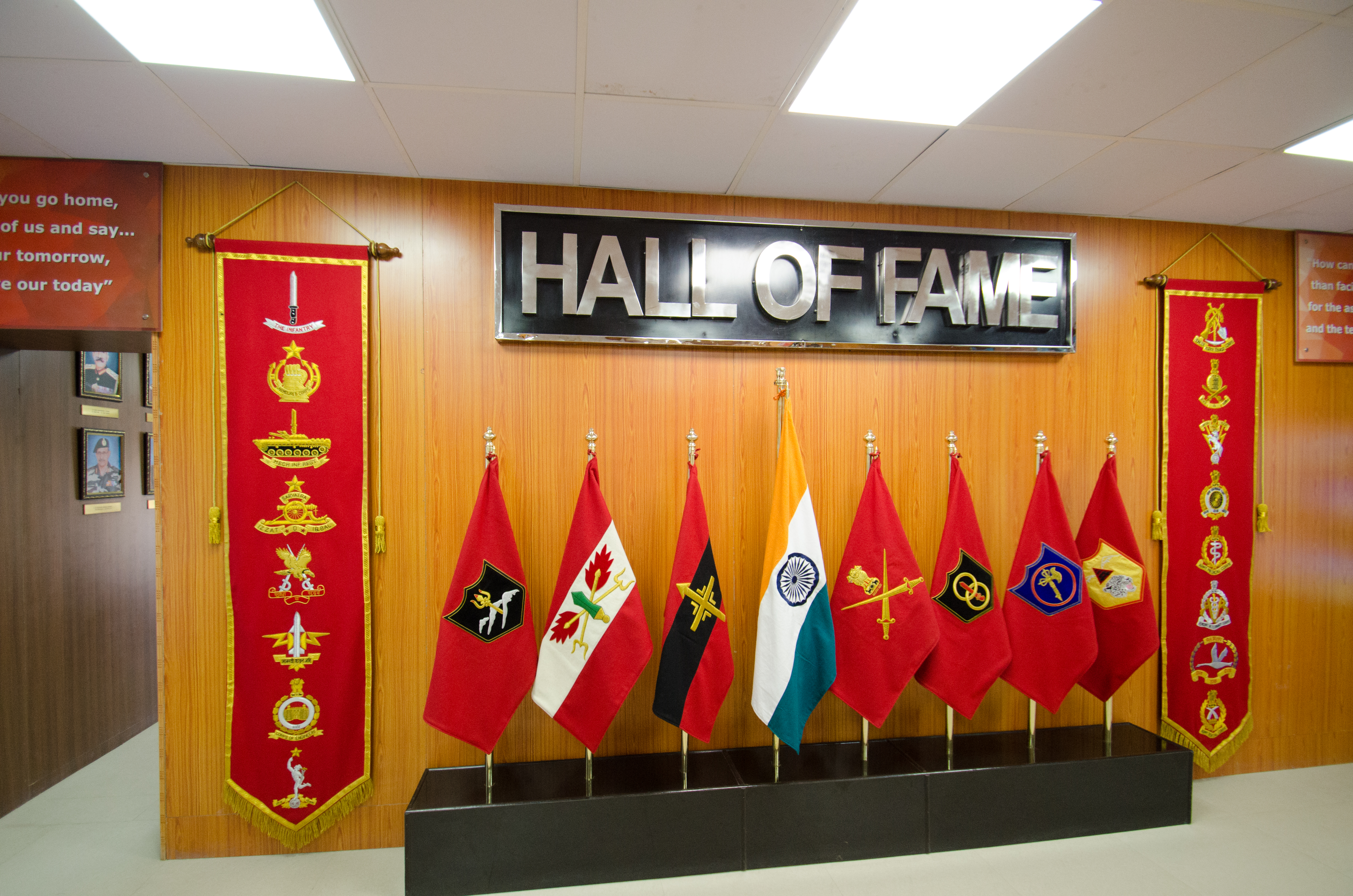
Flags of XIV Corps and its constituent divisions and brigades

- The 3rd Infantry Division (Trishul Division) - It is also currently responsible for security of the entire eastern Ladakh LAC border with China. The division has three infantry brigades stationed at Tangste, Kairi and Daulat Beg Oldie (DBO); under it, along with an artillery brigade.
  - The division was created in October 1962 in Ladakh. It fought in the Indo-Pakistani War of 1965. In 1991, it was part of the XV Corps. Its headquarters was at Karu, 40 km from Leh. During the Kargil War, the division consisted of the 3rd Artillery Brigade (the special division for artillery missions), 70th Infantry Brigade (reassigned from Demchok, Ladakh) on the Chinese border, and the 102nd Infantry Brigade. Both were normally assigned to the division.
- The 8th Mountain Division - (Forever in Operations Division) - It is presently tasked to look after the LoC. It also includes a Division Artillery Brigade. Headquartered at Khumbathang, Ladakh.
  - It was established in 1963 to carry out counter insurgency operations in Nagaland. Until 1990, it was headquartered at Kohima under III Corps. As trouble erupted in Kashmir in the late 1980s, the division was moved to the Kashmir Valley, making it the spearhead of the counter-insurgency operations. During the Kargil War, it was rushed into the Kargil-Drass and Batalik sectors from Kashmir Valley, where it proved its mettle.
- The 72nd Infantry Division - Being raised and includes HQ supported by a Brigade as of March 2025. To support the 3rd Division and replace Uniform Force of Rashtriya Rifles in Ladakh. The Division will have a total of 10,000-15,000 combat troops with additional 8,000 support personnel. The Division HQ includes 25 officers, 30 JCOs and 112 soldiers.
  - The formation was cleared to be raised under XVII Corps with its base in Pathankot in 2017 but the raising was halted midway in 2017-18 due to "paucity of funds". As of May 2025, the Division is being re-raised under XIV Corps with its warfighting elements finalised though it will not include any additional manpower but only restructuring of previously moved elements during 2020–2021 China–India skirmishes.
- 102 (Independent) Infantry Brigade (Siachen Brigade)
- 118 (Independent) Infantry Brigade (Parashu Brigade)
- 254 (Independent) Armoured Brigade (Snow Leopard Brigade)
- One Bhairav Battalion
- The High Altitude Medical Research Centre (HAMRC), 153 General Hospital of the 14 Corps, is the highest multi-specialty hospital in the world along with 14 Corps Dental Unit being the highest multi-speciality dental unit in the world providing treatment in extreme climatic conditions.
- Uniform Force of Rashtriya Rifles from Poonch district in Jammu & Kashmir was moved to Ladakh sector on permanent basis in 2020 as part of the ORBAT reorganization.

== List of commanders ==
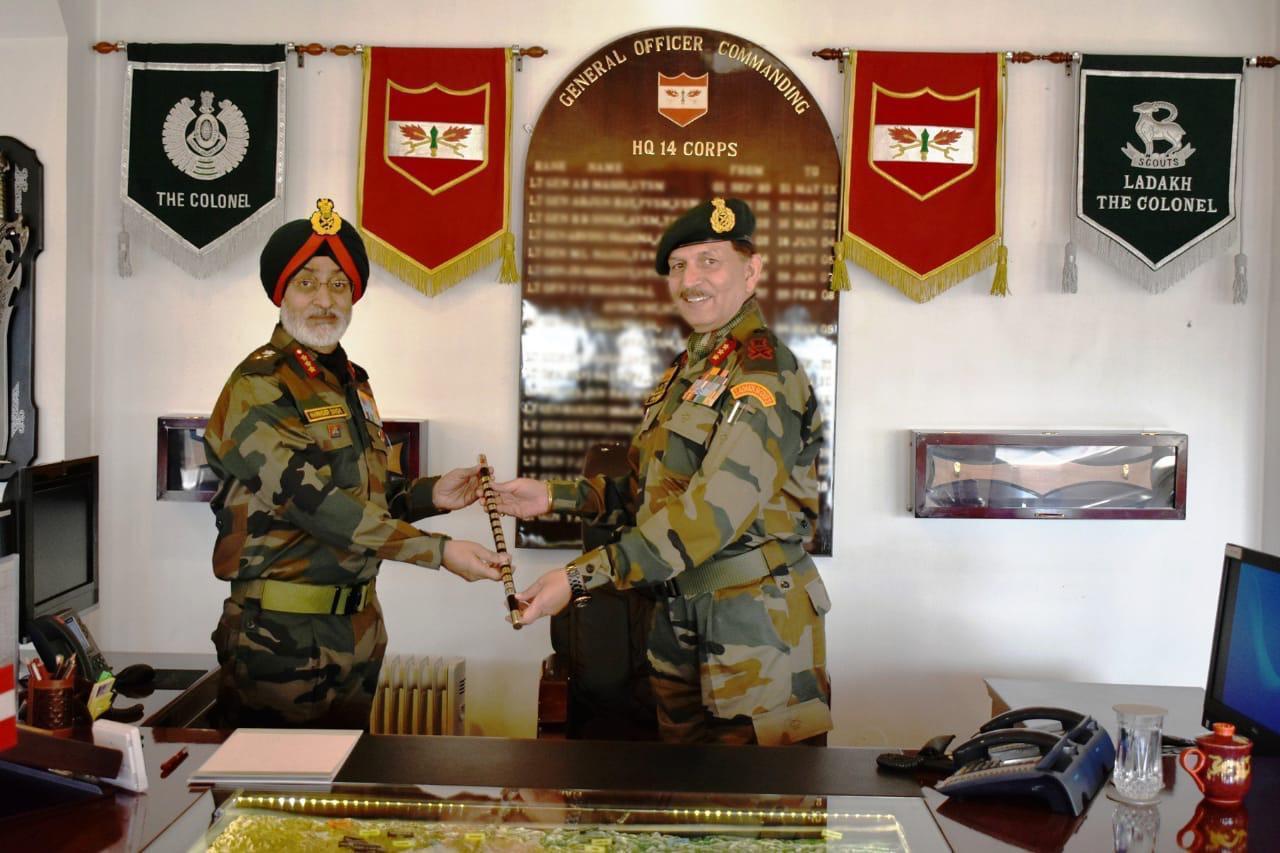
Lieutenant General Harinder Singh assuming command of ‘Fire & Fury Corps’ relieving Lieutenant General YK Joshi, October 2019

Rank	Name	Assumed Office	Left office	Unit of Commission	References
Lieutenant General	A B Masih	September 1999	May 2000	Kumaon Regiment	
Lieutenant General	Arjun Ray	June 2000	March 2002	Kumaon Regiment	
Lieutenant General	RB Singh	April 2002	December 2003	Brigade of the Guards	
Lieutenant General	Sudhir Kumar	December 2003	2004	4th Gorkha Rifles	
Lieutenant General	Milan Lalitkumar Naidu	2004	October 2005	Rajput Regiment	
Lieutenant General	JK Mohanty	October 2005	January 2007	Dogra Regiment	
Lieutenant General	Prabodh Chandra Bhardwaj	January 2007	28 February 2008	Parachute Regiment	
Lieutenant General	Vijay Kumar Ahluwalia	1 March 2008	1 March 2009	Regiment of Artillery	
Lieutenant General	Shri Krishna Singh	2009	30 November 2010	8th Gorkha Rifles	
Lieutenant General	Ravi Dastane	2011	2012	Regiment of Artillery	
Lieutenant General	Rajan Bakshi	2012	May 2013	17th Horse (Poona Horse)	
Lieutenant General	Rakesh Sharma	June 2013	2014	11th Gorkha Rifles	
Lieutenant General	Balwant Singh Negi	2014	2 July 2015	Assam Regiment	
Lieutenant General	Shravan Kumar Patyal	2 July 2015	24 August 2016	4th Gorkha Rifles	
Lieutenant General	Parminder Jit Singh Pannu	25 August 2016	2017	Maratha Light Infantry	
Lieutenant General	Santosh Kumar Upadhya	2017	30 August 2018	Garhwal Rifles	
Lieutenant General	Yogesh Kumar Joshi	31 August 2018	9 October 2019	Jammu and Kashmir Rifles	
Lieutenant General	Harinder Singh	10 October 2019	13 October 2020	Maratha Light Infantry	
Lieutenant General	PGK Menon	13 October 2020	4 January 2022	Sikh Regiment	
Lieutenant General	Anindya Sengupta	5 January 2022	12 March 2023	Punjab Regiment	
Lieutenant General	Rashim Bali	13 March 2023	30 June 2024	Sikh Light Infantry	
Lieutenant General	Hitesh Bhalla	1 July 2024	29 June 2026	Maratha Light Infantry	
Lieutenant General	Madanraj Pande	30 June 2026	Incumbent	Mahar Regiment	

Leh war memorial (XIV Corps)
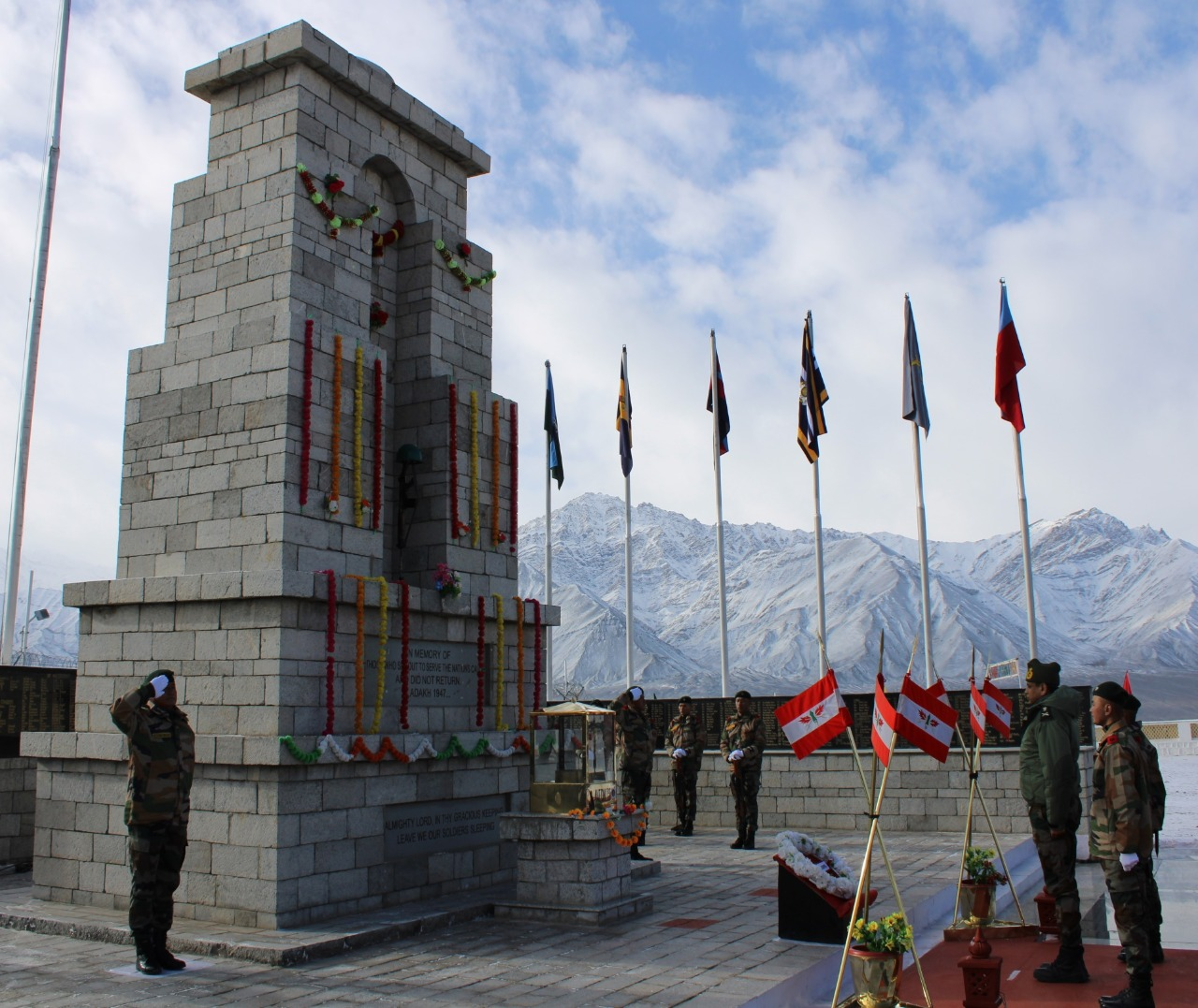
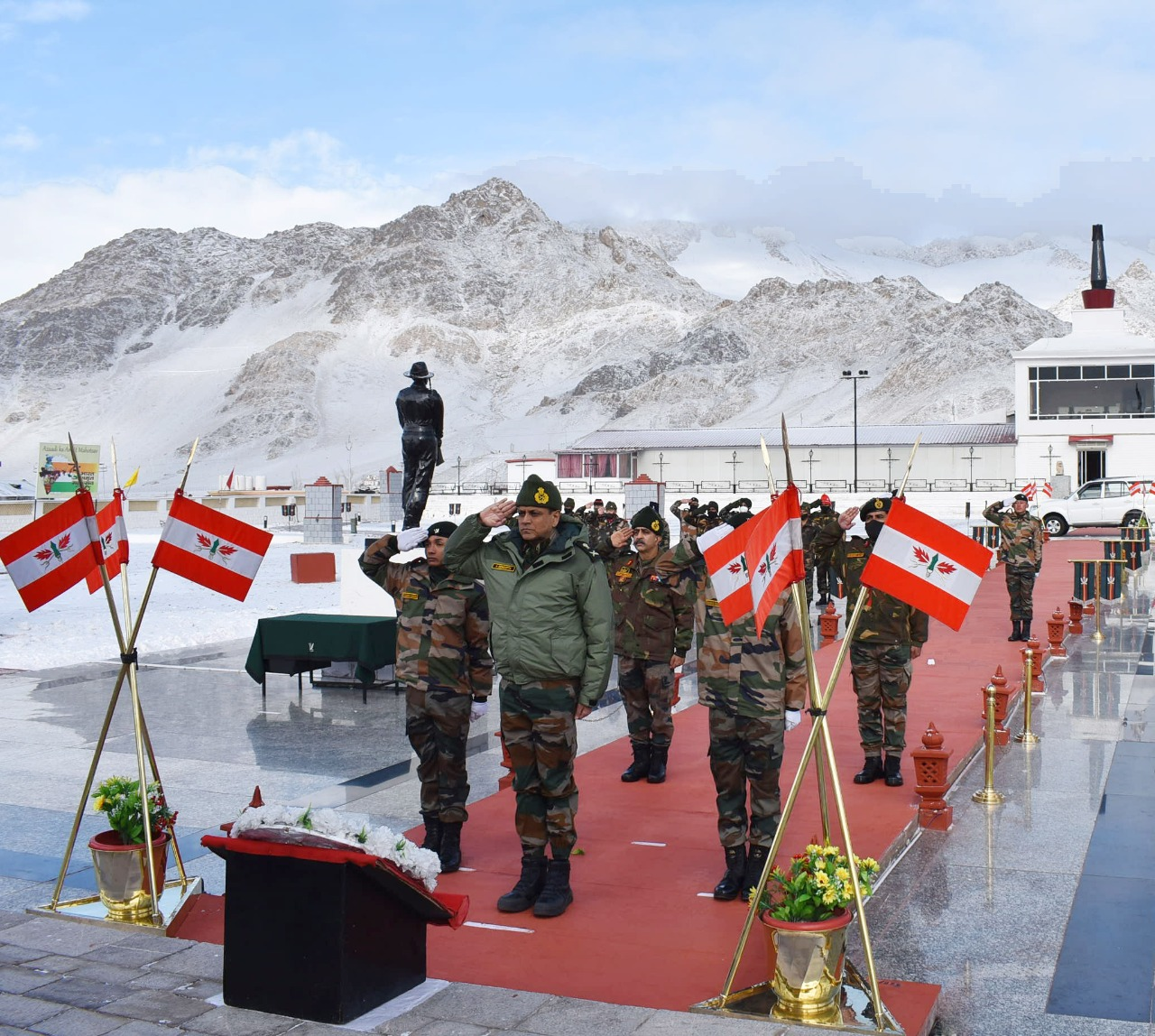
