= Prabodh Chandra Bhardwaj =

Recipient of Shaurya Chakra

Lieutenant General P. C. Bhardwaj PVSM, AVSM, VrC, SC, VSM
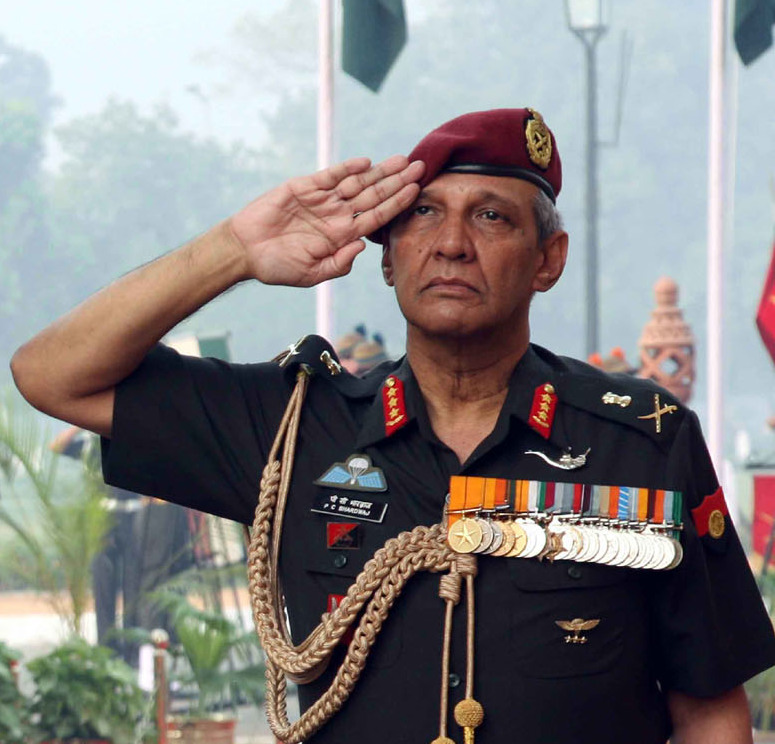
- Military career
- Allegiance: India
- Branch: Indian Army
- Service years: 1970 – 2010
- Rank: Lieutenant General
- Service number: IC-24178P
- Unit: 1 Para (SF)
- Commands: Northern Army; XIV Corps; 17 Mountain Division; 1 Para (SF)
- Conflicts: Indo-Pakistani War of 1971; Operation Pawan; Kargil War
- Awards: Param Vishisht Seva Medal; Ati Vishisht Seva Medal; Vir Chakra; Shaurya Chakra; Vishisht Seva Medal

Lieutenant General Prabodh Chandra Bhardwaj, PVSM, AVSM, VrC, SC, VSM is a former General Officer of the Indian Army. He last served as the Vice Chief of Army Staff, having assumed office on 1 October 2009 following the retirement of Lieutenant General Noble Thamburaj. He also served as the General Officer Commanding-in-Chief Northern Command. He is one of the most decorated officers of the Indian Army, with a war-time gallantry award and a peace-time gallantry award to his name.

== Career ==
Lieutenant General PC Bhardwaj was commissioned into 1st battalion, Parachute Regiment on 14 June 1970. He is an alumnus of National Defence Academy, Indian Military Academy, Defence Services Staff College, Wellington and National Defence College.

A specialist in Special Operations, he was the first person from the Indian Army to undergo the rigorous Commando Divers Course at Naval Diving School. He excelled on the course, qualifying as an instructor. He has also attended the Special Forces Officers Course at Fort Bragg in the US and earned an instructor rating.

He commanded his battalion, 1 Para (Commando), in counter-insurgency operations along India's eastern border with China and Myanmar, and later commanded counter-insurgency Force Delta in Doda/Kishtwar. He commanded a mountain brigade in Nagaland and also the elite 50th Parachute Brigade. As a brigadier, he commanded an infantry brigade and was the deputy director general at the Directorate General of Military Operations, Army Headquarters. He was appointed as the Defence Attache at Embassy of India at Yangon in Myanmar from 1994 to 1997. As a Major General, he was the General Officer Commanding Delhi Area where he was awarded the Ati Vishisht Seva Medal for distinguished service. Upon promotion to the rank of Lieutenant General, he commanded XIV Corps, responsible for the vast areas of Ladakh and the Siachen Glacier before assuming command of Northern Command on 1 March 2008. Upon being awarded the Param Vishisht Seva Medal on 26 January 2009, he became the most decorated soldier in the Indian Army.

== Post-military career ==
Lt. Gen Bhardwaj is a board member of the Welham Boys' School and also on the governing council of the Raphael Ryder Cheshire International Centre, both in Dehradun.

== Honours and decorations ==
=== Vir Chakra Citation ===
As a Second Lieutenant, Bhardwaj was awarded the Vir Chakra for operations during the Indo-Pakistani War of 1971. His Vir Chakra citation reads as follows.

CITATION
SECOND LIEUTENANT PRABODH CHANDRA BHARDWAJ

On the night of 16 December 1971, Second Lieutenant Prabodh Chandra Bhardwaj, a platoon commander in a battalion of the Parachute Regiment, formed part of the company which was assigned the task of capturing an enemy position in the Ferozepore Sector. This position was held in strength by the enemy and protected by mines and obstacles. During the assault, his platoon came under the effective fire of an enemy machine gun firing from a bunker. Second Lieutenant Bhardwaj, with utter disregard for his safety, charged the bunker, lobbed a grenade inside and immediately thereafter, rushing inside the bunker, he bayoneted the personnel and captured the medium machine gun. In this process he was injured by a bullet in the forehead. Undeterred by his injury, he pressed on with the assault and charged another machine gun bunker. Here again, he followed up his grenade attack with the bayonet and succeeded in capturing the second machine gun.

In this action, Second Lieutenant Prabodh Chandra Bhardwaj displayed gallantry, determination and leadership of a high order.

=== Shaurya Chakra Citation ===
As a Colonel, Bhardwaj was also awarded the Shaurya Chakra for a rescue operation where tourists who were stranded in a cable car were rescued in a joint operation conducted by 1 Para (Commando) and the Indian Air Force. His Shaurya Chakra citation reads as follows:

CITATION
COLONEL PRABODH CHANDRA BHARDWAJ

On 13th October 92 at 1930 hours, Commanding Officer 1 Para (Commando) was informed that 10 passengers were stranded in a cable car due to snapping of a haulage. The cable car was suspended in mid air at a height of 1300 feet, about 500 from the terminus at Timber Trail, Parwanoo in Himachal Pradesh. He was asked to move to the site and launch a special rescue mission. Within a short time, a team of five trained officers and personnel was selected for this purpose. Major Ivan Joseph Crasto was asked to lead the team. Over the next one hour, the Commanding Officer assembled the team, discussed the various options and collected the diverse equipment which could be utilised for heliborne as well as ground based rescue operations. At 0930 hours on 14 October 92 the Commanding Officer and Major Ivan Joseph Crasto carried out detailed aerial recce with the pilots. At 1630 hours, the Mi-17 mission was launched. The Commanding Officer personally accompanied Major Crasto to supervise the landing on the stranded cable car and to deal with emergencies. This attempt failed because of a number of problems. After several attempts Major Crasto could be lowered and he landed on the top of the cable car. Colonel Prabodh Chandra Bhardwaj accompanied each sortie to supervise the rescue operation, on the 14th and 15th October 92. In conducting the overall heli-rescue operation, Colonel Bhardwaj displayed high order of planning, organising and risk-taking capabilities. Even though he faced several odds and he knew that the operation was extremely hazardous, he did not give up and ensured that the operation was a success. In this operation, he displayed confidence, courage, resoluteness of purpose, determination and valour.

Colonel Prabodh Chandra Bhardwaj, VrC has thus displayed exemplary courage, bravery, determination, technical skill and professional competence in making a task, full of hazards, completely successful.

Param Vishisht Seva Medal		Ati Vishisht Seva Medal	
Vir Chakra	Shaurya Chakra	Vishisht Seva Medal	Wound Medal
Samanya Seva Medal	Special Service Medal	Paschimi Star	Operation Vijay Star
Siachen Glacier Medal	Sangram Medal	Operation Vijay Medal	Operation Parakram Medal
Sainya Seva Medal	High Altitude Service Medal	Videsh Seva Medal	50th Anniversary of Independence Medal
25th Anniversary of Independence Medal	30 Years Long Service Medal	20 Years Long Service Medal	9 Years Long Service Medal

== Dates of rank ==
Insignia	Rank	Component	Date of rank
	Second Lieutenant	Indian Army	14 June 1970
	Lieutenant	Indian Army	14 June 1972
	Captain	Indian Army	14 June 1976
	Major	Indian Army	14 June 1983
	Lieutenant-Colonel	Indian Army	1 November 1991
	Colonel	Indian Army	1 February 1993
	Brigadier	Indian Army	18 June 1999
	Major General	Indian Army	29 June 2004
	Lieutenant-General	Indian Army	30 January 2007 (seniority from 1 October 2006)

Military offices
Preceded by Noble Thamburaj	Vice Chief of Army Staff; 1 October 2009 – 30 November 2010	Succeeded by Avtar Singh Lamba
Preceded by Harcharanjit Singh Panag	General Officer Commanding-in-Chief Northern Command; 1 March 2008 – 30 September 2009	Succeeded by Baljit Singh Jaswal
