= Iqroop Singh Ghuman =

Lieutenant General I S Ghuman PVSM, AVSM, ADC
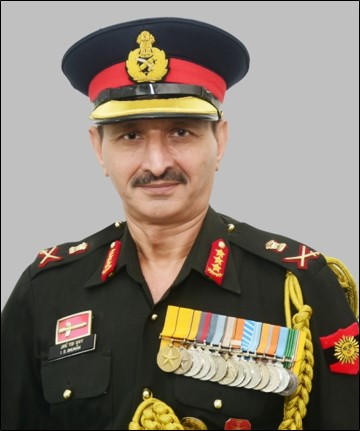
- Military career
- Allegiance: India
- Branch: Indian Army
- Service years: June 1981 – 31 March 2021
- Rank: Lieutenant General
- Service number: IC-39607H
- Unit: Brigade of the Guards
- Commands: Central Command; Deputy Chief of Army Staff(IS&T); XXI Corps
- Awards: Param Vishisht Seva Medal; Ati Vishisht Seva Medal

Lieutenant General Iqroop Singh Ghuman, PVSM, AVSM, ADC is a commissioned officer of the Indian Army. He was the General Officer-Commanding-in-Chief (GOC-in-C), Central Command of the Indian Army. He took office on 2 October when Lt Gen Abhay Krishna retired.

== Early life and education ==
Ghuman is an alumnus of National Defence Academy, Pune and Indian Military Academy, Dehradun. He has also attended the Junior and Senior Command Course at Army War College, Mhow; Defence Service Staff College course at Defence Services Staff College, Wellington; and National Defence Course Course at National Defence College, Delhi.

== Career ==
Ghuman was commissioned into Brigade of the Guards in June 1981. He has held various important Command, Staff and Instructor appointments during his career. He has commanded an anti-tank guided missile battalion during Operation Parakram, an infantry brigade and an Infantry Division. He has held various other appointments including an instructor at Army Infantry School, Mhow; Director Perspective Planning in Army Headquarters, Colonel General Staff of Army Training Command; Brigade Major of a mountain brigade; Brigadier General Staff of a Corps in Western India; Major General Operational Logistics at HQ Eastern Command and Chief of Staff of Western Command. He has also served as an observer in the United Nations Mission in Angola. In July 2019, he was appointed to succeed Abhay Krishna as GOC-in-C, Central Command, effective 1 October.

Ghuman served as Deputy Chief of Army Staff (Information Systems & Training) assuming office in 2018.

Prior to Deputy Chief of Army Staff, he was the Commander, XXI Corps of the Indian Army and assumed office, 1 July 2017 onwards. He assumed the post from Lt General Cherish Mathson.

== Honours and decorations ==
During his career, he has been awarded the Ati Vishisht Seva Medal in 2017 for his service as Chief of Staff of Western Command. and the Param Vishisht Seva Medal in January 2019.

Param Vishisht Seva Medal		Ati Vishisht Seva Medal	
Special Service Medal	Siachen Glacier Medal	Operation Vijay Medal	Operation Parakram Medal
Sainya Seva Medal	High Altitude Service Medal	Videsh Seva Medal	50th Anniversary of Independence Medal
30 Years Long Service Medal	20 Years Long Service Medal	9 Years Long Service Medal	MONUA

== Dates of rank ==
Insignia	Rank	Component	Date of rank
	Second Lieutenant	Indian Army	13 June 1981
	Lieutenant	Indian Army	13 June 1983
	Captain	Indian Army	13 June 1986
	Major	Indian Army	13 June 1992
	Lieutenant-Colonel	Indian Army	16 December 2004
	Colonel	Indian Army	1 October 2005
	Brigadier	Indian Army	21 March 2009 (seniority from 13 June 2008)
	Major General	Indian Army	1 March 2014 (seniority from 10 October 2011)
	Lieutenant-General	Indian Army	1 August 2016

Military offices
Preceded by Abhay Krishna	General Officer-Commanding-in-Chief Central Command; 2 October 2019 – 1 April 2021	Succeeded by Yogendra Dimri
Preceded by	Deputy Chief of Army Staff (Information Systems and Strategy); 2018 - 30 September 2019	Succeeded by
Preceded by Cherish Mathson	General Officer Commanding XXI Corps; 1 July 2017 - 2018	Succeeded by Ravendra Pal Singh
