= 68th Armoured Regiment (India) =

Indian Army regiment

68 Armoured Regiment
- Active: 1968 – present
- Country: India
- Allegiance: India
- Branch: Indian Army
- Type: Armour
- Size: Regiment
- Nickname: The Gladiators
- Mottos: विजय और सम्मान; Vijay aur Samman (Victory and Honour)
- Colors: Grey, Red and Blue
- March: Entry of the Gladiators
- Equipment: T-72 M1

Commanders
- Colonel of the Regiment: Lieutenant General Rajesh Pushkar
- Notable commanders: Lieutenant General Alok Singh Kler, PVSM, VSM

Insignia
- Abbreviation: 68 Armd Regt

68th Armoured Regiment is an armoured regiment which is part of the Armoured Corps of the Indian Army.

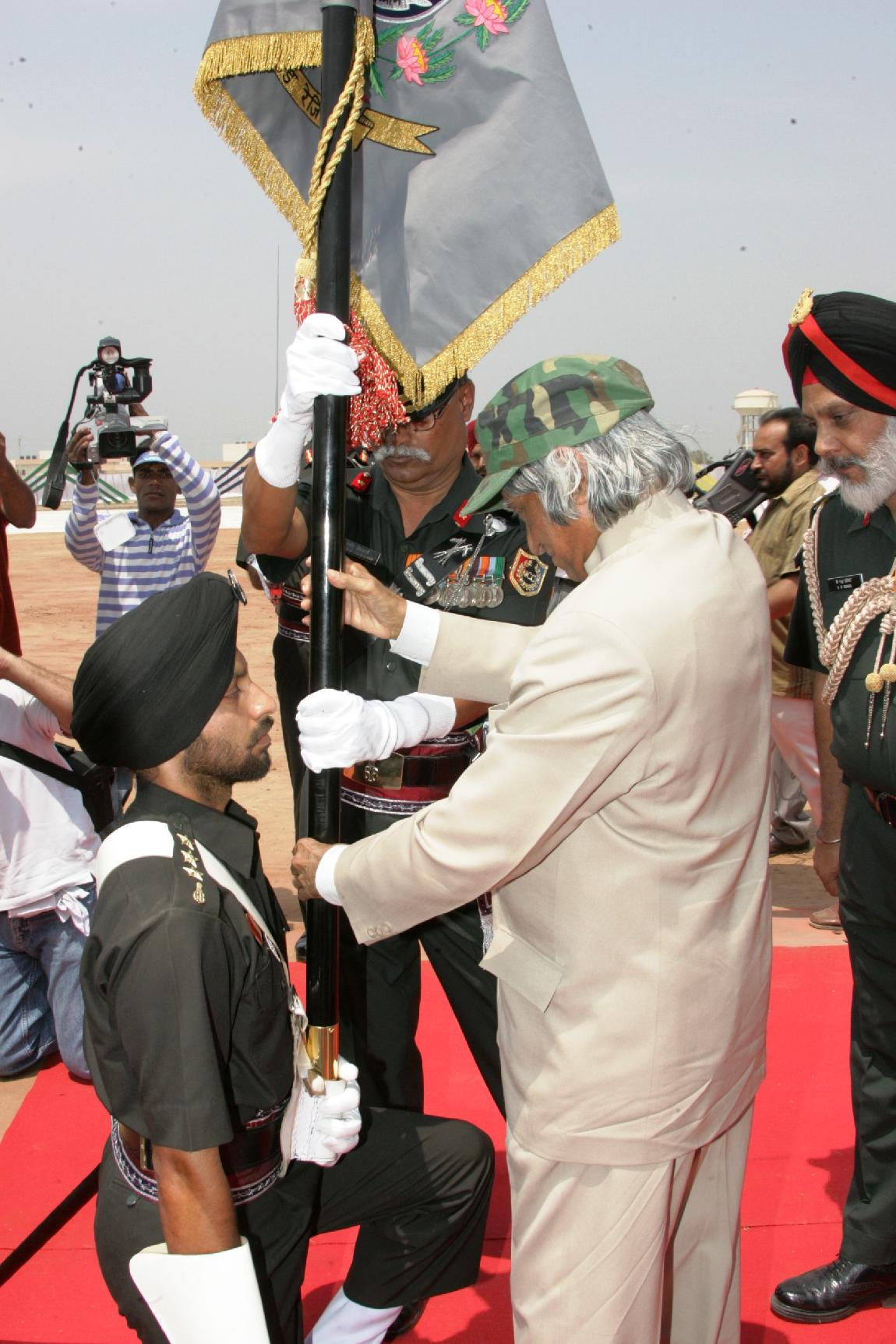
The President of India, Dr APJ Abdul Kalam presenting the Standard to 68 Armoured Regiment

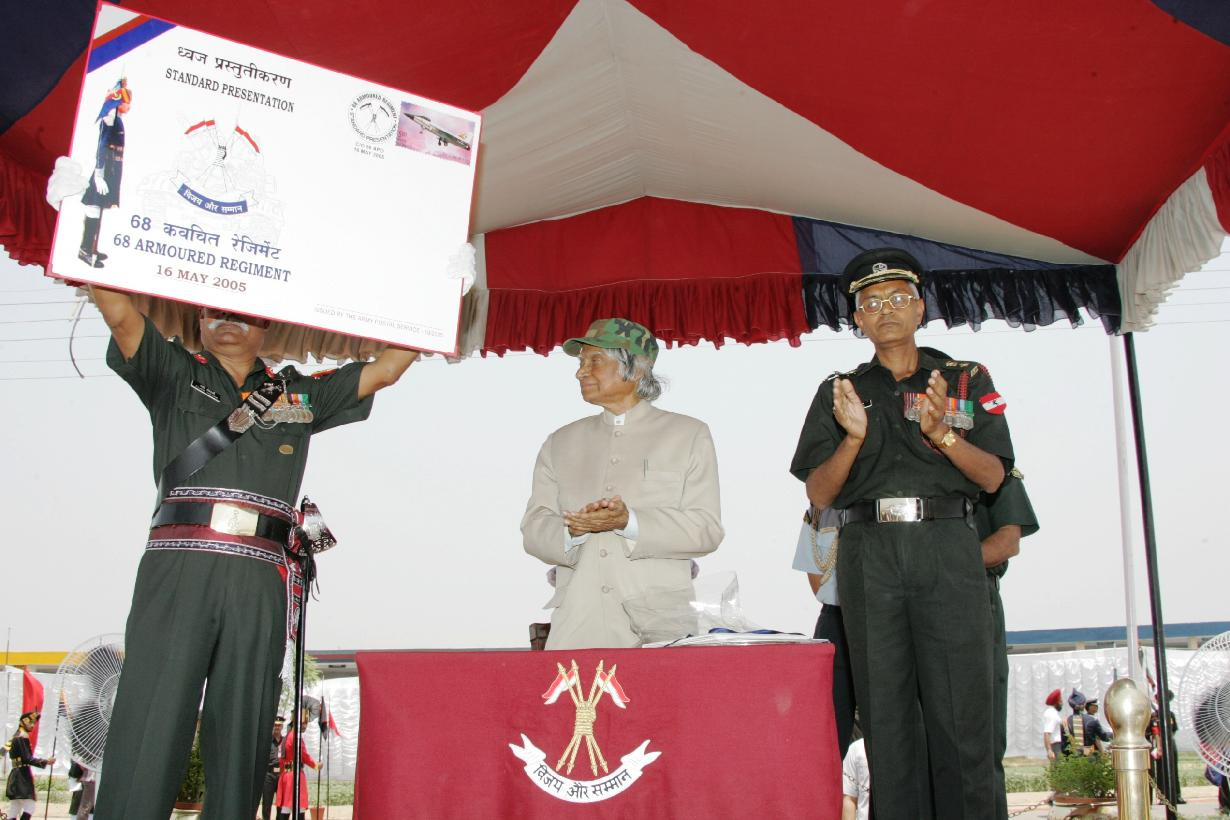
Release of the 'First day cover' on the occasion of Standard Presentation

== Formation ==
The regiment was raised on 1 March 1968 by Lieutenant Colonel (later Brigadier) R.N. Thumby at Ahmednagar. It was raised with Vijayanta tanks. Unlike most armoured regiments raised after Independence with a mixed class composition, 68 Armoured Regiment was raised from four different ethnic classes. It drew troops from Rajput troops from the Armoured Corps, Marathas from the Bombay Sappers and the Maratha Light Infantry, Ahirs from the Armoured Corps, Regiment of Artillery and the Kumaon Regiment and Gujjars from the Grenadier and Rajput Regiments. Most of the Armoured troops came from the 66th Armoured Regiment. Lieutenant Colonel (later Major General) Salim Caleb, MVC was appointed the first Colonel Commandant of the Regiment.

== History ==
The regiment was made part of the 1st Armoured Division on 30 March 1970. The regiment could not participate in the Indo-Pakistani War of 1971 as the armoured division was not committed to battle. In 1985, it was converted to T-72 tanks. The regiment took part in Operation Trident, Operation Rakshak and Operation Parakram.

The Regiment was presented the ‘President’s Standards’ at Bathinda on 16 May 2005 by the President of India, Dr A. P. J. Abdul Kalam.

The regiment made history crossing the 13,000 feet plus Zoji La pass and being the first armoured regiment to be based near Nyoma in Ladakh.

== Regimental Insignia ==
The regiment has the nickname "The Gladiators", because of its choice of the regimental march "Entry of the Gladiators".

The regiment cap badge of the officers is in silver and depicts four crossed lances with pennons with a gauntlet (mailed fist) at the crossing, each lance symbolising each ethnic class recruited to the regiment. The cap badge worn by the Junior Commissioned Officers and 'other ranks' is identical to that worn by officers, in white metal, and has an additional scroll (in brass plate) with the regimental motto "Vijay aur Samman" in Devanagari script. The shoulder title consists of the numeral "68" within a mailed fist above.

The motto of the regiment is 'विजय और सम्मान' (Vijay aur Samman) which translates to 'Victory and Honour'.
