= Deependra Singh Hooda =

Lieutenant General, Indian Army (born 1956)

Lieutenant General Deependra Singh Hooda PVSM, UYSM, AVSM, VSM**, ADC
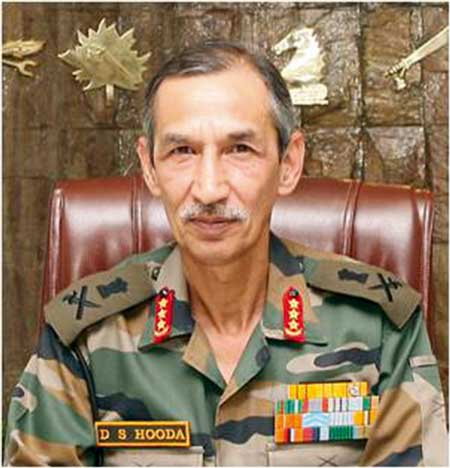
- Born: 12 November 1956 (age 69)
- Spouse: Rashmi Hooda
- Military career
- Allegiance: India
- Branch: Indian Army
- Service years: 15 December 1976 - 30 November 2016
- Rank: Lieutenant General
- Unit: 4/4 Gorkha Rifles
- Commands: Northern Army; 16 Corps
- Conflicts: Kargil War
- Awards: Param Vishisht Seva Medal; Uttam Yudh Seva Medal; Ati Vishisht Seva Medal; Vishisht Seva Medal (Bar)

Lieutenant General Deependra Singh Hooda, PVSM, UYSM, AVSM, VSM & Bar, ADC (born 12 November 1956) is the former General Officer Commanding-in-Chief of the Indian army's Northern Command. The General Officer was the Northern Army Commander during the 'surgical strike' in September 2016. He is most prominently known for his views on Kashmir with a strong emphasis on human rights. With a career spanning forty years, he has served on both the Northern and Eastern borders of India.

== Military career ==
He did his schooling from St. Columba's School, Delhi. He is an alumnus of National Defence Academy, Pune. He was commissioned into the Indian Army on 15 December 1976. He spent time in his early career in the 4th Battalion of the 4th Gorkha Rifles, which he later commanded.

His career spanned over four decades. He was awarded the Param Vishisht Seva Medal, Uttam Yudh Seva Medal, Ati Vishist Seva Medal and the Vishisht Seva Medal (Bar). He has been an instructor at the Military College of Telecommunication Engineering, Mhow and Col GS of a Strike Corps. He has also had tenures in the Military Operations Directorate and the Quarter Master General's Branch at the Army Headquarters. He has also served on the United Nations Mission in Ethiopia and Eritrea for which he was awarded the UNMEE Medal.

He retired on 30 November 2016 after nearly 40 years of service in the Indian Army.

=== Awards and decorations ===

Param Vishisht Seva Medal	Uttam Yudh Seva Medal	Ati Vishist Seva Medal	Vishisht Seva Medal
Samanya Seva Medal	Special Service Medal	Operation Vijay Medal	Operation Parakram Medal
Sainya Seva Medal	High Altitude Service Medal	Videsh Seva Medal	50th Independence Anniversary Medal
30 Years Long Service Medal	20 Years Long Service Medal	9 Years Long Service Medal	UNMEE Medal

=== Dates of rank ===
Insignia	Rank	Component	Date of rank
	Second Lieutenant	Indian Army	15 December 1976
	Lieutenant	Indian Army	15 December 1978
	Captain	Indian Army	15 December 1982
	Major	Indian Army	15 December 1987
	Lieutenant-Colonel	Indian Army	
	Colonel	Indian Army	
	Brigadier	Indian Army	4 July 2006
	Major General	Indian Army	1 April 2010 (seniority from 8 January 2008)
	Lieutenant-General	Indian Army	17 August 2012 (substantive)

== Personal life ==
He is married to Rashmi Hooda.

== In popular culture ==
The character of Lieutenant General Ajay Garewal in the 2019 movie Uri: The Surgical Strike played by Satyajit Sharma is based on Lieutenant General Deependra Singh Hooda.

Military offices
Preceded by Sanjiv Chachra	General Officer Commanding-in-Chief Northern Command; 1 June 2014 - 30 November 2016	Succeeded by Devraj Anbu
Preceded by A S Nandlal	General Officer Commanding XVI Corps; 1 September 2012 - 15 April 2014	Succeeded by Konsam Himalay Singh
