= Shirish Baban Deo =

Former Vice Chief the Indian Air Force

Air Marshal Shirish Baban Deo PVSM, AVSM, VM, VSM, ADC
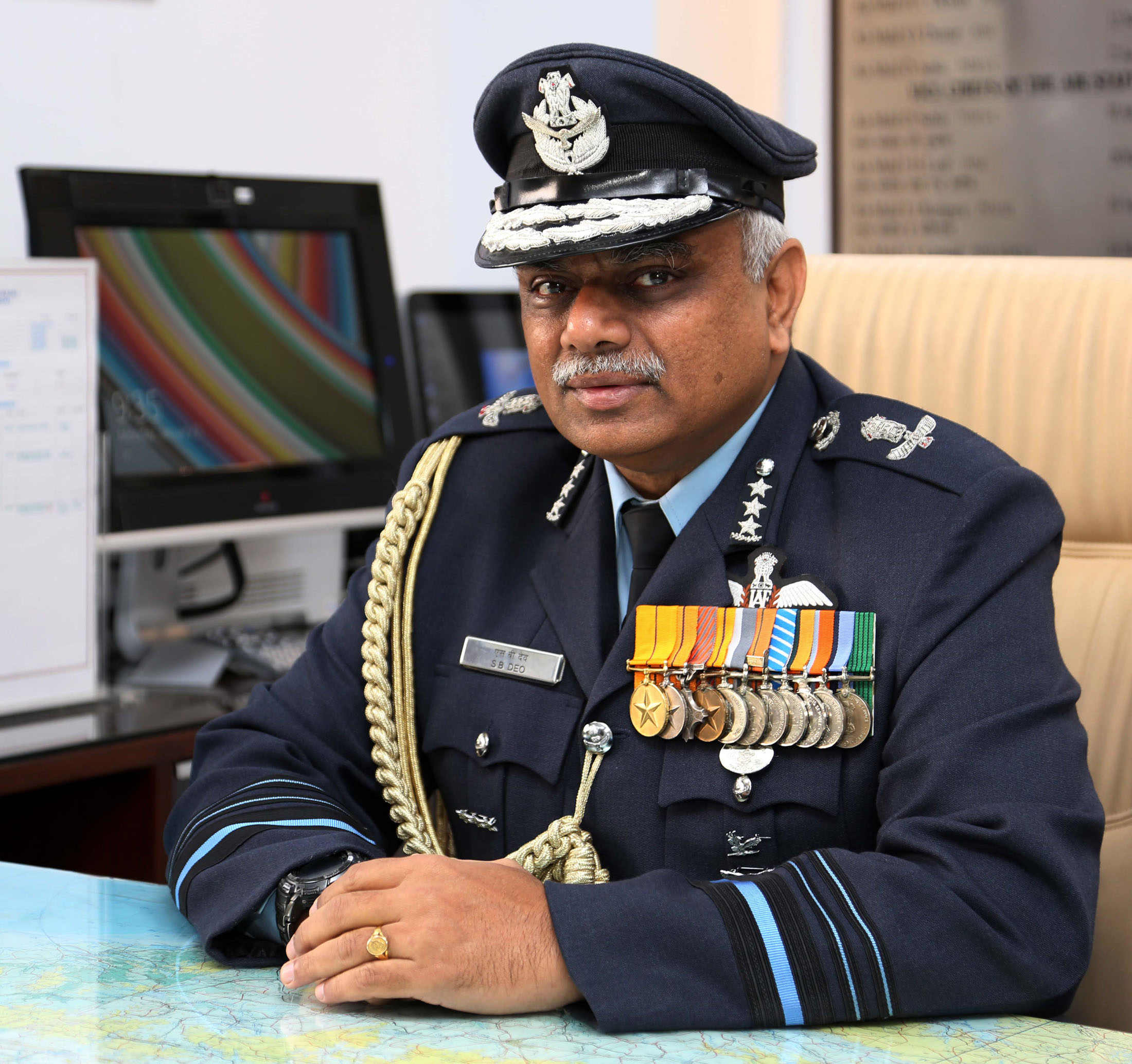
- Air Marshal SB Deo
- Born: Nagpur, Maharashtra, India
- Spouse: Anjna
- Military career
- Allegiance: India
- Branch: Indian Air Force
- Service years: 15 June 1979 – 30 September 2018
- Rank: Air Marshal
- Commands: Vice Chief of the Air Staff; Western Air Command; Eastern Air Command; Director General Air Operations
- Awards: Param Vishisht Seva Medal; Ati Vishisht Seva Medal; Vishisht Seva Medal; Vayu Sena Medal

Air Marshal Shirish Baban Deo, PVSM, AVSM, VM, VSM, ADC is a retired Indian Air Force officer who was the Vice Chief of the Air Staff (VCAS) of the Indian Air Force. He assumed the office of Vice Chief on 31 December 2016 from Air Chief Marshal Birender Singh Dhanoa and served in the same capacity till his retirement on 30 September 2018.

== Early life and education ==
Deo was born in Nagpur, Maharashtra. He attended Somalwar School and is an alumnus of Defence Services Staff College, Wellington.

== Career ==
Deo was commissioned into the fighter stream of the Indian Air Force on 15 June 1979. He has clocked more than 4000 hours of operational and training flying experience. He held several key operational and administrative appointments at various stages of his service including Fighter Combat Leader; A2 qualified instructor and Directing Staff at TACDE; Chief Operations Officer of a front-line forward base; Commanding Officer of Air Force Station Jodhpur; Director General Air Operations at Air Headquarters; Air Officer Commanding of COBRA Group; AD Commander; Air-I at Headquarters; Central Air Command; Air Officer Commanding in Chief of Eastern Air Command and Air Officer Commanding in Chief of Western Air Command.

== Awards and medals ==
Deo has been awarded several medals: the Param Vishisht Seva Medal, the Ati Vishisht Seva Medal, the Vishisht Seva Medal, and the Vayu Sena Medal. He was also appointed as Honorary ADC to the President of India on 1 January 2016.

Param Vishisht Seva Medal	Ati Vishisht Seva Medal	Vayu Sena Medal	Vishisht Seva Medal
Samanya Seva Medal	Siachen Glacier Medal	Sainya Seva Medal	High Altitude Service Medal
50th Anniversary of Independence Medal	30 Years Long Service Medal	20 Years Long Service Medal	9 Years Long Service Medal

== Personal life ==
Deo is married to Mrs. Anjna Deo and they have a son, Karan Deo, who is a group captain in the Indian Air Force. His younger brother, Justice Rohit Deo, is elevated as a Judge of the Bombay High Court on 5 June 2017.

Military offices
Preceded by Birender Singh Dhanoa	Vice Chief of Air Staff; 31 December 2016 – 30 September 2018	Succeeded by Anil Khosla
Preceded by S S Soman	Air Officer Commanding-in-Chief, Western Air Command; 1 September 2015 – 31 December 2016	Succeeded by Chandrashekharan Hari Kumar
Preceded by R K Jolly	Air Officer Commanding-in-Chief, Eastern Air Command; 1 January 2015 – 31 August 2015	Succeeded by Chandrashekharan Hari Kumar
Preceded by Daljit Singh	Director General Air Operations; 2013 - 2014	Succeeded by Anil Khosla
