= Balwant Singh Negi =

Indian Army general

Lieutenant General Balwant Singh Negi PVSM, UYSM, YSM, SM, VSM**
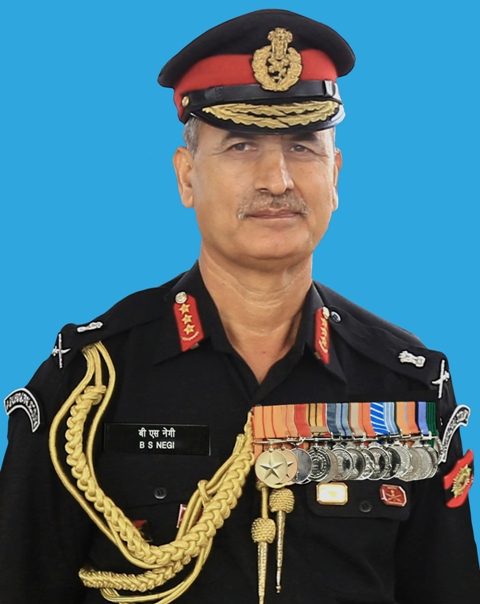
- Military career
- Allegiance: India
- Branch: Indian Army
- Service years: 16 December 1978 – 30 September 2018
- Rank: Lieutenant General
- Service number: IC-35479Y
- Unit: Assam Regiment
- Commands: Central Army; XIV Corps
- Conflicts: Operation Meghdoot; Operation Parakram; Operation Vijay; Operation Trident; Operation Falcon
- Awards: Param Vishisht Seva Medal; Uttam Yudh Seva Medal; Yudh Seva Medal; Sena Medal; Vishisht Seva Medal & Bar

Lieutenant General Balwant Singh Negi, PVSM, UYSM, YSM, SM, VSM & Bar is a former General Officer-Commanding-in-Chief (GOC-in-C), Central Command of the Indian Army who served in office from 1 December 2015 till 30 September 2018. He assumed the post after Lt General Rajan Bakshi retired and was succeeded by Lt General Abhay Krishna.

== Early life and education ==
Negi is an alumnus of Rashtriya Indian Military College, National Defence Academy and Indian Military Academy. He has completed the senior command course at Defence Service Staff College, Wellington; command & staff course in Bangladesh; higher command course at Army War College, Mhow and command course at National Defence College, New Delhi. He also holds a double MPhil in Strategic Studies and Defence Studies); a double master's degree in Defence Studies and a PhD in Strategic Studies from Madras University where his research topic was "China’s Modernisation and its implications".

== Career ==
Negi was commissioned into Assam Regiment on 16 December 1978. He has vast experience in North East India and Jammu & Kashmir. He has commanded a battalion on the Siachen Glacier, a brigade in Western Command, a Counter Insurgency Force in Jammu & Kashmir and Jharkhand & Bihar, XIV Corps (Leh). He has held command of many operations including Operation Meghdoot, Operation Vijay, Operation Rakshak, Operation Parakram, Operation Falcon, Operation Trident, Operations Sahayata I and II. He has also held staff appointments including: Colonel General Staff of an Infantry Division in Jammu & Kashmir during Operation Parakram; Commandant of the Indian Military Academy.

During 40 years of his career he has been awarded Yudh Seva Medal for Siachen in 1998; Sena Medal for Jammu & Kashmir in 2002; Vishisht Seva Medal twice for Jammu & Kashmir in 2009 and 2013; Uttam Yudh Seva Medal in 2016 and the Param Vishisht Seva Medal in January 2018. He has also been awarded with General Officer Commanding-in-Chief Commendation Card (twice) and Chief of Integrated Defence Staff Commendation Card.

== Honours and decorations ==

Param Vishisht Seva Medal	Uttam Yudh Seva Medal	Yudh Seva Medal	Sena Medal
Vishisht Seva Medal (Bar)	Special Service Medal	Siachen Glacier Medal	Operation Vijay Medal
Operation Parakram Medal	Sainya Seva Medal	High Altitude Service Medal	Videsh Seva Medal
50th Anniversary of Independence Medal	30 Years Long Service Medal	20 Years Long Service Medal	9 Years Long Service Medal

== Personal life ==
Most of his hobbies center around sports; he has trekking and motor biking experience in the Himalayas on a 350cc Royal Enfield Motorcycle, and has won a few awards for his participation in said sports.

Military offices
Preceded by Lt Gen Rajan Bakshi	General Officer-Commanding-in-Chief Central Command; 1 December 2015 – 30 September 2018	Succeeded by Abhay Krishna
Preceded by Lt Gen Manvender Singh	Commandant of Indian Military Academy; 3 August 2015 – 1 December 2015	Succeeded by
Preceded by	General Officer Commanding XIV Corps; 2014 - 2 July 2015	Succeeded by Shravan Kumar Patyal
