= Cherish Mathson =

Indian Army officer

Lieutenant General Cherish Mathson PVSM, SM, VSM
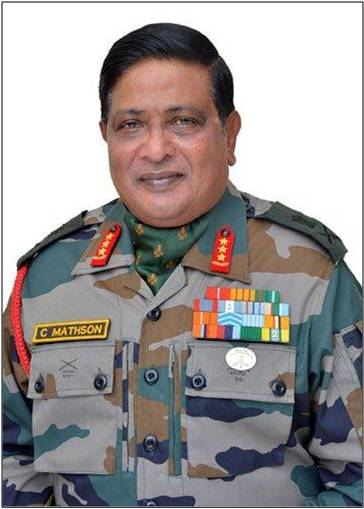
- Military career
- Allegiance: India
- Branch: Indian Army
- Service years: June 1980 – 31 August 2019
- Rank: Lieutenant General
- Service number: IC-38722
- Unit: 12 Garhwal rifles
- Commands: South Western Army; XXI Corps; Special Frontier Force; 54th Infantry Division
- Awards: Param Vishisht Seva Medal; Sena Medal; Vishisht Seva Medal

Lieutenant General Cherish Mathson, PVSM, SM, VSM is a retired officer of the Indian Army who served as General Officer-Commanding-in-Chief (GOC-in-C), South Western Command. He assumed office on 1 August 2017 taking over from Lt General Abhay Krishna, and was succeeded by Lt General Alok Singh Kler on 1 September 2019.

== Early life and education ==
Mathson is an alumnus of Sainik School, Kazhakootam and the Defence Services Staff College in Wellington. He has also attended Senior Command Course at Army War College, Mhow, the Long Defence Management Course at the College of Defence Management, Secunderabad and the National Defence College, New Delhi.

== Career ==
Mathson was commissioned into Garhwal Rifles in June 1980. He has vast experience in rural and urban insurgencies and has served two tenures in Siachen Glacier, in Operation Blue Star, in Mizoram against the Mizo National Front (MNF) and as a UN observer in Somalia.

He has commanded a battalion on the Line of Control in Jammu and Kashmir during Operation Parakram, the Trivandrum Brigade in an amphibious Role, the 54th Infantry Division in the Southern Command, Inspector General of the Special Frontier Force and the XXI Corps in Bhopal.

He has also held staff positions including Deputy Assistant Quarter Master General Operations (DAQMG) of an Independent Infantry Brigade, Colonel Administration (Col Adm) of a Mountain Division, Brigadier Administration (Brig Adm) of the XII Corps, Deputy Technical Manager (Land Systems) in Army HQ, Senior Defence Specialist (Military) in the National Security Council Secretariat and in the Defence Acquisition Wing (Ministry of Defence). He was also the Colonel of the Regiment of Garhwal Rifles.

During his career, he has been awarded the Sena Medal, the Vishist Seva Medal in 2010 and the Param Vishisht Seva Medal in 2018.

== Honours and decorations ==

Param Vishisht Seva Medal	Sena Medal	Vishisht Seva Medal	Samanya Seva Medal
Special Service Medal	Siachen Glacier Medal	Operation Vijay Medal	Operation Parakram Medal
Sainya Seva Medal	High Altitude Service Medal	Videsh Seva Medal	50th Anniversary of Independence Medal
30 Years Long Service Medal	20 Years Long Service Medal	9 Years Long Service Medal	UN Mission in Angola Medal

== Dates of rank ==
Insignia	Rank	Component	Date of rank
	Second Lieutenant	Indian Army	7 June 1980
	Lieutenant	Indian Army	7 June 1982
	Captain	Indian Army	7 June 1985
	Major	Indian Army	7 June 1991
	Lieutenant-Colonel	Indian Army	31 December 2002
	Colonel	Indian Army	1 February 2005
	Brigadier	Indian Army	2 May 2008 (seniority from 12 January 2008)
	Major General	Indian Army	1 January 2013 (seniority from 6 April 2011)
	Lieutenant-General	Indian Army	10 November 2015 (substantive)

Military offices
Preceded by Abhay Krishna	General Officer-Commanding-in-Chief South Western Command; 1 August 2017 – 31 August 2019	Succeeded by Alok Singh Kler
Preceded by Pradeep Singh Mehta	General Officer Commanding XXI Corps; 1 July 2016 – 30 June 2017	Succeeded by Iqroop Singh Ghuman
Preceded by Amit Sharma	General Officer Commanding 54th Infantry Division; 2012 - 2013	Succeeded by R K Jagga
