= Ravendra Pal Singh =

Ravendra Pal Singh may refer to:

- Ravendra Pal Singh (general)
- Ravendra Pal Singh (politician)
