= Abhay Krishna =

Former Lieutenant General of the Indian army

Lieutenant General Abhay Krishna PVSM UYSM AVSM SM VSM
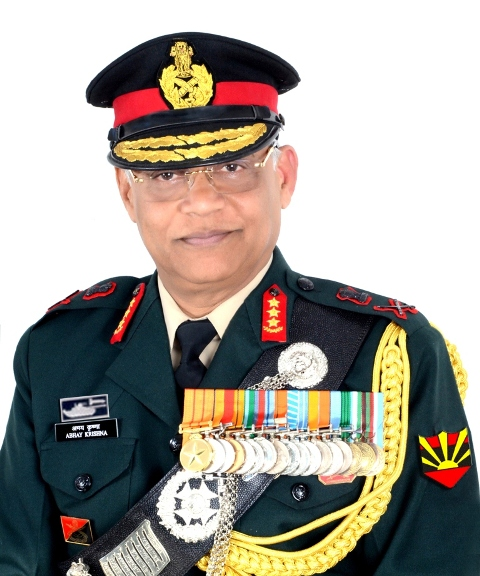
- Military career
- Allegiance: India
- Branch: Indian Army
- Service years: 7 June 1980 – 30 September 2019
- Rank: Lieutenant General
- Service number: IC-38679A
- Unit: 2 Rajputana Rifles
- Commands: Central Command; Eastern Command; South Western Command; III Corps; 27 Mountain Division
- Awards: Param Vishisht Seva Medal; Uttam Yudh Seva Medal; Ati Vishisht Seva Medal; Sena Medal; Vishisht Seva Medal

Lieutenant General Abhay Krishna, PVSM, UYSM, AVSM, SM, VSM, ADC is a retired officer of Indian Army. He served as General Officer-Commanding-in-Chief (GOC-in-C), Central Command from 1 October 2018 following the retirement of Lieutenant General Balwant Singh Negi, to 30 September 2019. He was succeeded by Lieutenant General Iqroop Singh Ghuman. Prior to that, he commanded the Eastern Command and South Western Command of the Indian Army

== Early life and education ==
Krishna is an alumnus of St Xavier's High School, Patna; National Defence Academy, Khadakwasla and Indian Military Academy, Dehradun.

== Career ==
Krishna was commissioned into Rajputana Rifles on 7 June 1980. He has vast experience and has served four tenures along Line of Actual Control, two tenures as UN observer, in Mozambique & Rwanda and as Chief of Staff (UN forces) in Burundi. He has commanded a Rashtriya Rifles Battalion in the Kashmir valley, an infantry battalion in Sikkim, Brigadier General Staff 3 Corps, 27 Mountain division (Kalimpong), Chief of Staff (Delhi area) and GOC III Corps (Dimapur). He has served as GOC-in-C of the South Western Command (25 January 2017 – 30 July 2017) and GOC-in-C of Eastern Command (1 August 2017 – 30 September 2018). He commanded the RR during Operation Hifazat (Manipur) and Operation Rakshak (Kupwara).

== Honours and decorations ==
During 39 years of his career, he has won a gallantry award in 1994 for being taken hostage, negotiating for release of other hostages and demobilisation of rebel forces during UN Peace Keeping Mission in Mozambique. He has also been awarded a Vishisht Sena Medal, Sena Medal, Ati Vishisht Seva Medal in 2014, Uttam Yudh Seva Medal in 2017 and Param Vishisht Seva Medal in 2018. He was also the Colonel of the Regiment Rajputana Rifles and was Second-in-Command for the Republic Day parade in 2015.

	Param Vishisht Seva Medal	Uttam Yudh Seva Medal	
Ati Vishisht Seva Medal	Sena Medal	Vishisht Seva Medal	Samanya Seva Medal
Special Service Medal	Operation Vijay Medal	Sainya Seva Medal	High Altitude Service Medal
Videsh Seva Medal	50th Anniversary of Independence Medal	30 Years Long Service Medal	20 Years Long Service Medal
9 Years Long Service Medal	ONUMOZ	UNAMIR	ONUB

== Dates of rank ==
Insignia	Rank	Component	Date of rank
	Second Lieutenant	Indian Army	7 June 1980
	Lieutenant	Indian Army	7 June 1982
	Captain	Indian Army	7 June 1985
	Major	Indian Army	7 June 1991
	Lieutenant-Colonel	Indian Army	31 December 2002
	Colonel	Indian Army	1 February 2005
	Brigadier	Indian Army	1 September 2008 (seniority from 8 January 2008)
	Major General	Indian Army	1 January 2013 (seniority from 4 April 2011)
	Lieutenant-General	Indian Army	12 October 2015 (substantive)

Military offices
Preceded by Balwant Singh Negi	General Officer-Commanding-in-Chief Central Command; 1 October 2018 – 30 September 2019	Succeeded by Iqroop Singh Ghuman
Preceded by Praveen Bakshi	General Officer-Commanding-in-Chief Eastern Command; 1 August 2017 - September 30, 2018	Succeeded by Manoj Mukund Naravane
Preceded by Sarath Chand	General Officer-Commanding-in-Chief South Western Command; 25 January 2017 – 31 July 2017	Succeeded by Cherish Mathson
Preceded by Bipin Rawat	General Officer Commanding III Corps; 23 Nov 2015 – 31 December 2016	Succeeded by Anil Chauhan
