= Shravan Kumar Patyal =

Indian lieutenant

Lieutenant General Shravan Kumar Patyal PVSM, UYSM, SM
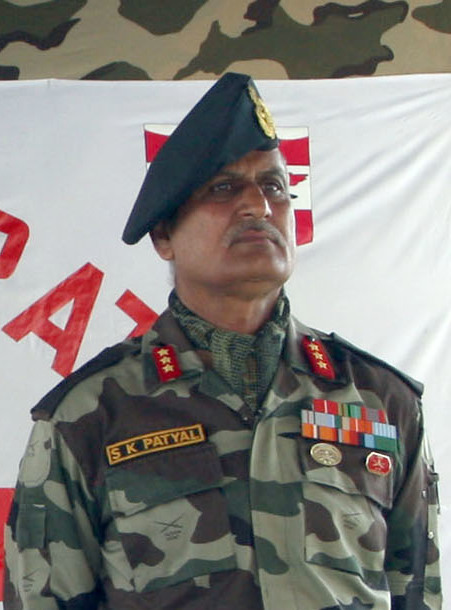
- Military career
- Allegiance: India
- Branch: Indian Army
- Service years: 1979 – 2018
- Rank: Lieutenant General
- Service number: IC-35960X
- Unit: 4th Gorkha Rifles
- Commands: XIV Corps
- Awards: Param Vishisht Seva Medal; Uttam Yudh Seva Medal; Sena Medal

Lieutenant General Shravan Kumar Patyal, PVSM, UYSM, SM was the Deputy Chief of Army Staff (DCOAS) of the Indian Army and assumed office on 31 March 2017. He assumed the post after Lt General Subrata Saha retired from office.

== Career ==
Patyal was commissioned into the Gorkha Rifles in 1979. He has held many positions including Commander of XIV Corps (Leh), Director General Military Intelligence (DGMI) and Border Roads Organization.

During his career, he has been awarded the Sena Medal, the Uttam Yudh Seva Medal in 2017 and the Param Vishisht Seva Medal in 2018 for his service.

== Honours and decorations ==

Param Vishisht Seva Medal		Uttam Yudh Seva Medal	
Sena Medal	Samanya Seva Medal		Special Service Medal
Operation Vijay Medal	Operation Parakram Medal	Sainya Seva Medal	Videsh Seva Medal
50th Anniversary of Independence Medal	30 Years Long Service Medal	20 Years Long Service Medal	9 Years Long Service Medal

Military offices
Preceded by Subrata Saha	Deputy Chief of Army Staff; 31 March 2017 - Present	Succeeded by Incumbent
Preceded by Balwant Singh Negi	General Officer Commanding XIV Corps; 2 July 2015 - 2016	Succeeded by
