= Kakrala Kalan =

- village
- Location in Punjab, India Kakrala Kalan (India)
- Coordinates: 30°53′57″N 76°18′18″E
- Country: India
- State: Punjab
- District: Ludhiana

Population (2011)
  - Total: 4,165

Languages
  - Official: Punjabi
  - Regional: Punjabi
- Time zone: UTC+5:30 (IST)
- PIN: 141125

Kakrala Kalan is a village in the Ludhiana district in Punjab, India. The total population of the village is about 4,165.
