= Chandrashekharan Hari Kumar =

Retired Indian Air Force officer

Air Marshal Chandrashekharan Hari Kumar PVSM, AVSM, VM, VSM, ADC
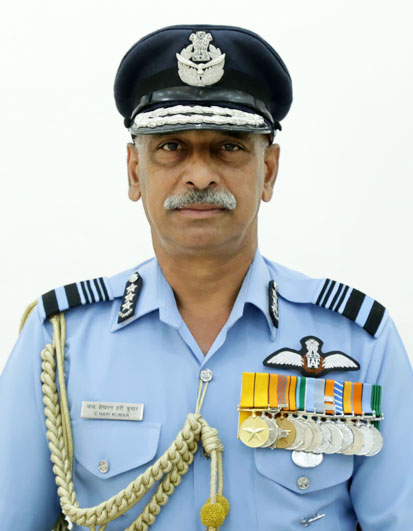
- Spouse: Devika
- Military career
- Allegiance: India
- Branch: Indian Air Force
- Service years: 14 December 1979 – 28 February 2019
- Rank: Air Marshal
- Commands: Western Air Command; Eastern Air Command
- Awards: Param Vishisht Seva Medal; Ati Vishisht Seva Medal; Vishisht Seva Medal; Vayu Sena Medal

Air Marshal Chandrashekharan Hari Kumar, PVSM, AVSM, VM, VSM, ADC is a retired officer of the Indian Air Force. He served as Air Officer Commanding-in-Chief (AOC-in-C), Western Air Command from 1 January 2017 to 28 February 2019. He assumed the office from Air Marshal Shirish Baban Deo and was succeeded by Air Marshal Raghunath Nambiar.

== Early life and education ==
Kumar is an alumnus of Rashtriya Indian Military College Dehradun, National Defence Academy, Defence Service Staff College, Wellington and National Defence College, New Delhi.

== Career ==
Kumar was commissioned into the fighter stream of the Indian Air Force on 14 December 1979. He has clocked over 3300 hours of flying and is a qualified flying instructor. He held several key operational and administrative appointments at various stages of his service including Fighter Combat Leader of a MiG-21 squadron; Commander of a front line fighter base; Ops-1A; Air-I at HQ WAC; Deputy Director Air Staff Inspection; Director Operations (Joint Planning); Assistant Chief of the Air Staff Operations (Offensive) at Air HQ; Senior Air Staff Officer (SASO) at HQ South Western Air Command; instructor at Fighter Training Wing (FTW), Tactics and Air Combat Development Establishment (TACDE) and College of Air Warfare (CAW). He was the AOC-in-C Eastern Air Command prior to his appointment as AOC-in-C Western Air Command.

Kumar has been awarded several medals: the Param Vishisht Seva Medal (January 2018), the Ati Vishisht Seva Medal (January 2016), the Vishisht Seva Medal (January 2015), the Vayu Sena Medal (January 2011) and the CAS commendation (October 1997).

== Personal life ==
Kumar is married to Mrs. Devika and they have two sons. He enjoys travelling and reading.

Military offices
Preceded by Shirish Baban Deo	Air Officer Commanding-in-Chief, Western Air Command; 1 January 2017 – 28 February 2019	Succeeded by Raghunath Nambiar
Preceded by Shirish Baban Deo	Air Officer Commanding-in-Chief, Eastern Air Command; 1 September 2015 – 31 December 2016	Succeeded by Anil Khosla
