= Konsam Himalay Singh =

Lieutenant General, Indian Army

Lieutenant General Konsam Himalay Singh PVSM, UYSM, AVSM, YSM
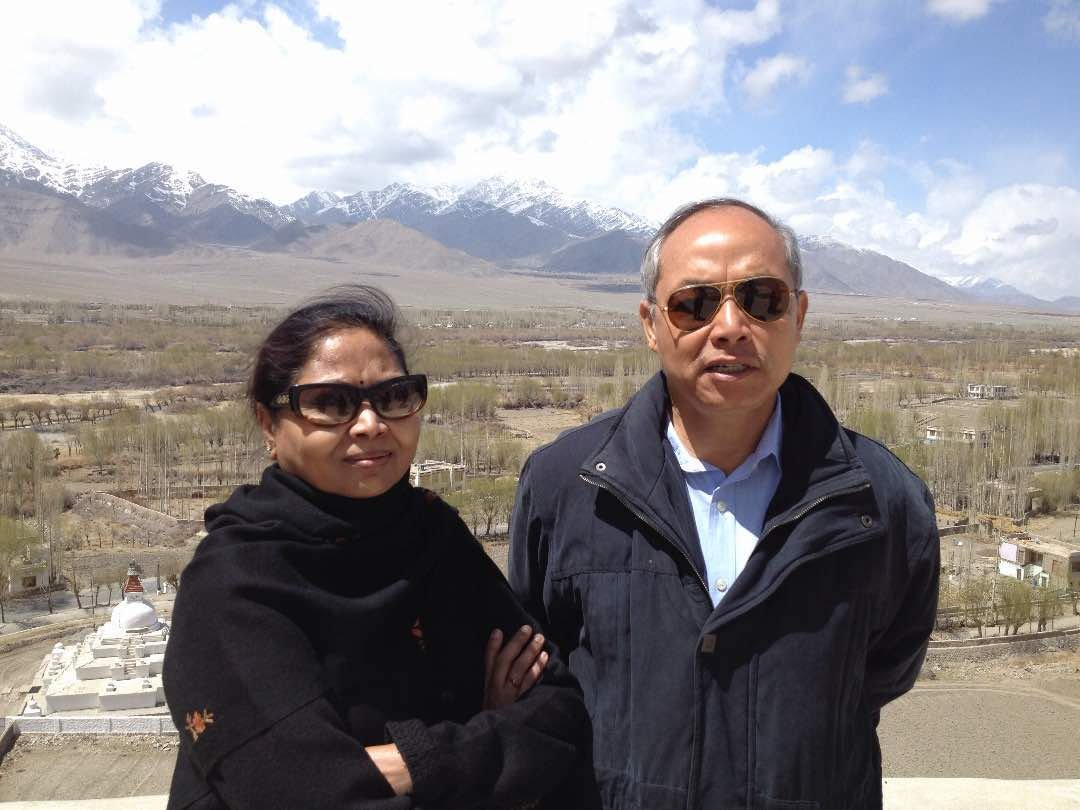
- Lt. Gen. K.H. Singh and his wife, Dr. Mangala
- Born: Charangpat, Thoubal district, Manipur, India
- Spouse: Dr. Mangala Devi
- Military career
- Allegiance: India
- Branch: Indian Army
- Service years: June 1978 – 2016
- Rank: Lieutenant General
- Service number: IC-35206W
- Unit: 27 Rajput
- Commands: XVI Corps
- Conflicts: Point 5770
- Awards: Param Vishisht Seva Medal; Uttam Yudh Seva Medal; Ati Vishisht Seva Medal; Yudh Seva Medal
- Other work: Chairman, Manipur Public Service Commission

Lieutenant General Dr. Konsam Himalay Singh PVSM, UYSM, AVSM, YSM is a retired Lieutenant General of the Indian Army. He is the first officer from northeast India to reach the rank of lieutenant general in the Indian Army and the first military officer from Manipur to reach the ranks of brigadier and major general. He was the Chairman of Manipur Public Service Commission and is currently a member of the Consultative Committee of Manipur Government on Naga Peace Talks as well as a visiting faculty member of Manipur University.

Appointed Chairman, Board of Governors, Indian Institute of Information Technology, Agartala. Source: ministry of Education, Govt of India letter no: FNo 54-9/2021-TS1 dated 26 August 2023

== Early life and education ==
Singh was born in Charangpat village in Thoubal district, Manipur, India, and had his early education in schools there. In 1968, he enrolled at the Sainik School Goalpara in Assam. Singh enrolled at the National Defence Academy in 1974 and received his bachelor's degree from that institution. He holds a master's degree in Defence Studies, and an MPhil in Strategic Studies from Madras University. Additionally, he has completed a postgraduate degree in management studies from Osmania University, Hyderabad, with distinction and earned his PhD from the Central University of Jammu in March 2018.

== Military career ==
Singh was commissioned into the 2nd Battalion, Rajput Regiment, in 1978. He commanded the 27th Battalion, Rajput Regiment, between 1998 and 2000 on the Siachen Glacier and commanded his battalion during the Battle of Point 5770 in the Kargil War in 1999, for which he was awarded the Yudh Seva Medal. He later served as a battalion commander at his alma mater, the National Defence Academy. Singh is a keen mountaineer and took part in the 1987 Kanchenjunga expedition. He has been awarded the Chief of Army Staff's commendation card three times during his career. Singh is also a graduate of the Defence Services Staff College, Wellington, and the National Defence College, New Delhi. He is also a recipient of the Param Vishisht Seva Medal, Uttam Yudh Seva Medal and Ati Vishisht Seva Medal.

He has vast operational experience in counter-insurgency operations in Jammu and Kashmir, where he served five tenures within 35 years, and four tenures in northeast India. His experience included counter-insurgency operations along the Line of Control, Line of Actual Control and HAA (High Altitude Area) environments. He was the commandant of the Infantry School, Mhow after becoming the General Officer Commanding (GOC) of XVI Corps (Nagrota). Before that, he was posted with the Military Secretary's branch at Army Headquarters, New Delhi.

== Personal life ==
Singh is the son of K. Ibopishak Singh and is married to a physician working with the Central Government Health Service, Delhi, as a chief medical officer. The couple has two daughters.

== Military awards and decorations ==

Param Vishisht Seva Medal	Uttam Yudh Seva Medal		Ati Vishisht Seva Medal
Yudh Seva Medal	Samanya Seva Medal	Special Service Medal	Operation Vijay Star
Siachen Glacier Medal	Operation Vijay Medal	Sainya Seva Medal	High Altitude Service Medal
50th Anniversary of Independence Medal	30 Years Long Service Medal	20 Years Long Service Medal	9 Years Long Service Medal

Military offices
Preceded by D S Hooda	General Officer Commanding XVI Corps; 16 April 2014 - 22 July 2015	Succeeded by Rajendra Ramrao Nimbhorkar
