= Rajendra Ramrao Nimbhorkar =

Indian general

Lieutenant General Rajendra Ramrao Nimbhorkar PVSM, UYSM, AVSM, SM**, VSM
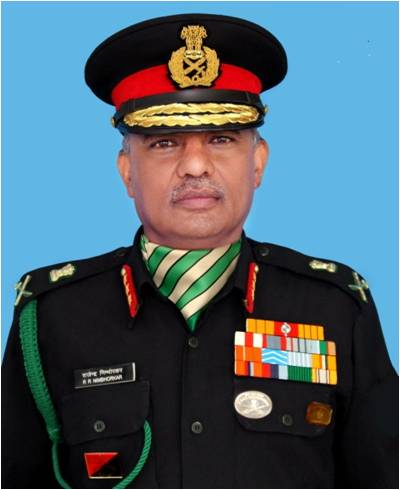
- Military career
- Allegiance: India
- Branch: Indian Army
- Service years: 1979 – 2019
- Rank: Lieutenant General
- Service number: IC-35965W
- Unit: 15 Punjab Regiment
- Commands: XVI Corps
- Conflicts: Operation Vijay
- Awards: Param Vishisht Seva Medal; Uttam Yudh Seva Medal; Ati Vishisht Seva Medal; Sena Medal; Vishisht Seva Medal

Lieutenant General Rajendra Ramrao Nimbhorkar, PVSM, UYSM, AVSM, SM**, VSM is a former officer of the Indian Army who served as the Master General Ordnance (MGO). He assumed office on 9 August 2017 after Lieutenant General Ravi Thodge retired. He was part of one of the strike corp which was responsible for carrying out three strikes inside POK in Surgical Strikes held in 2016 by the Indian Army to clean out all the Pakistani Terrorists Camps. As surgical strikes were carried out very secretly to maintain surprise, so very few people knew of them, one of those involved was Lt. Gen. Nimbhorkar.

== Early life and education ==
Nimbhorkar hails from a farming family in Vidarbha, Maharashtra. He is an alumnus of Sainik School, Satara; National Defence Academy, Pune and Indian Military Academy, Dehradun.He has also attended the military course at National Defence University, Washington DC and the National Defence College, Dhaka.

== Career ==
Nimbhorkar was commissioned into 15 Punjab Regiment in 1979.He has served in an operational role in several regions including Leh, Kargil, Kashmir Valley, Poonch, Rajauri, Rajasthan and Northeast India. He has held various command positions including 15 Punjab in Jammu and Kashmir; an infantry brigade Naoshera; Rashtriya Rifles; General Officer Commanding (GOC), Maharashtra, Gujarat and Goa; GOC of XVI Corps (Nagrota) in 2015 before taking over as MGO at Army HQ. He has served as a UN military observer in Angola. He was also appointed the Colonel of the Punjab Regiment on 1 March 2015.

Nimbhorkar was critically injured during Operation Vijay on Line of Control in Rajouri sector, commanding 15 Punjab. He also captured an enemy post in Dras sector as a captain and he killed 22 terrorists in Baramulla district of Kashmir as a Major.

During his career, he has been awarded COAS Commendation Card; C-in-C SFC Commendation Card; Sena Medal (gallantry) commanding a company in Dras sector; Sena Medal (distinguished service) commanding a brigade in Naoshera; Vishisht Seva Medal in Akhnoor sector; Uttam Yudh Sewa Medal in Nagrota; Ati Vishisht Seva Medal in south Kashmir and Param Vishisht Seva Medal as Master General of the Ordnance.

Lt. Gen. R.R. Nimbhorkar (Retd.) has been awarded Ph D. from Chaudhary Charan Singh University Meerut in July 2022.

== Honours and decorations ==

Param Vishisht Seva Medal		Uttam Yudh Seva Medal	
Ati Vishisht Seva Medal	Sena Medal	Vishisht Seva Medal	Wound Medal
Special Service Medal	Operation Vijay Star Medal	Operation Vijay Medal	Operation Parakram Medal
Sainya Seva Medal	High Altitude Service Medal	Videsh Seva Medal	50th Anniversary of Independence Medal
30 Years Long Service Medal	20 Years Long Service Medal	9 Years Long Service Medal	UNAVEM

Military offices
Preceded by Ravi Thodge	Master General of Ordnance; 9 August 2017 – 31 May 2018	Succeeded by S K Upadhya
Preceded by Konsam Himalay Singh	General Officer Commanding XVI Corps; 23 July 2015 – 8 October 2016	Succeeded by A K Sharma
