= Shalini =

Shalini is a feminine name used in India. Notable people with the name include:

- Shalini (actress) (born 1979), former Indian actress
- Shalini Divya, Indian chemist and entrepreneur in New Zealand
- Shalini Pandey (born 1993), Indian actress
- Shalini Kapoor Sagar, Indian actress
- Shalini Moghe (1914–2011), Indian educationist and social worker
- Shalini Vadnikatti, Indian actress
- Shalini Bharat, Professor and ex director of [TISS-TATA Institute of Social Science]
