= Jaiveer Singh Negi =

49th Commandant of the Indian Military Academy

Lieutenant General (Dr) Jaiveer Singh Negi PVSM, AVSM, YSM, VSM**
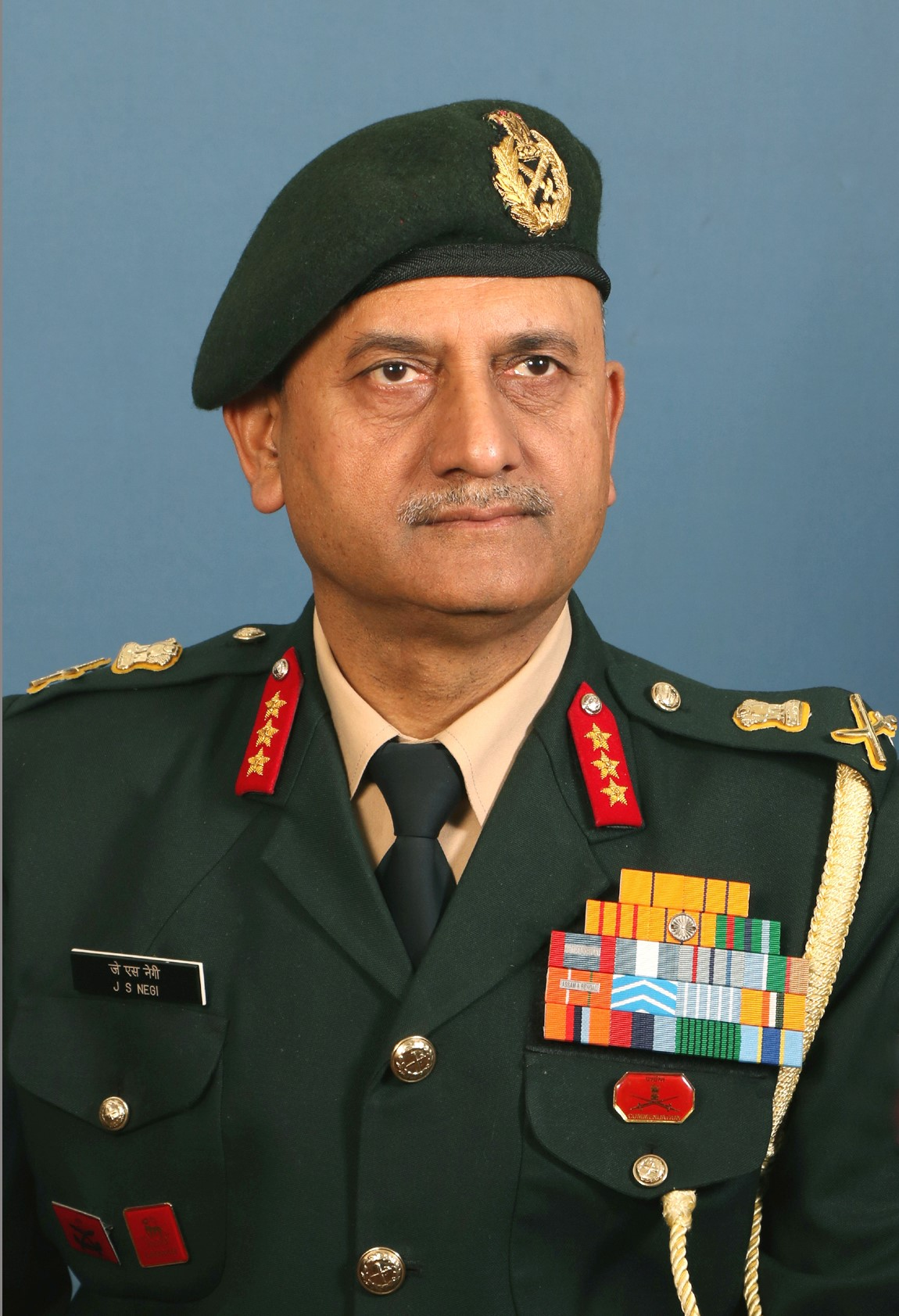

49th Commandant Indian Military Academy
- Preceded by: Lieutenant General Sanjay Kumar Jha
- Succeeded by: Lieutenant General Harinder Singh

Personal details
- Born: September 20, 1960 (age 65) Kamad Village, Chamoli, Garhwal, Uttarakhand

Military service
- Allegiance: India
- Branch/service: Indian Army
- Years of service: 13 June 1981 – 30 September 2020
- Rank: Lieutenant General
- Unit: 16 Dogra Regiment
- Commands: Indian Military Academy; Kharga Corps; 8 Mountain Division; 25 Sect Assam Rifles; 16 Dogra Regiment
- Awards: Param Vishisht Seva Medal; Ati Vishisht Seva Medal; Yudh Seva Medal; Vishisht Seva Medal**

Lieutenant General (Dr) Jaiveer Singh Negi (born 20 September 1960) PVSM, AVSM, YSM, VSM** is a retired General Officer who has served as the 49th Commandant of the Indian Military Academy. He took over from Lieutenant General Sanjay Kumar Jha, PVSM, AVSM, YSM, SM, on 1 February 2020. Prior to his appointment as Commandant of the Indian Military Academy, he was the Deputy Commander-in-Chief of Strategic Forces Command.

== Early life and education ==
Lt. General Negi was born in Kamad Village, Chamoli, Garhwal. He started his schooling in the village and later completed his schooling from St. John's H.S. School in Meerut. He is an alumnus of National Defence Academy (Pune) (58th course), Indian Military Academy (Dehradun) (68th course). He holds B.Sc from Jawaharlal Nehru University, M.Sc in Defence Studies from Defence Services Staff College (Wellington) (1994), M.Phil. in Defence and Strategic Studies from Devi Ahilya University (Indore), M.Phil. in Defence and Strategic Studies from University of Madras (Chennai), and PhD in Defence and Strategic Studies from Chaudhary Charan Singh University, Meerut. He has attended training at Junior Leaders Wing (Belgaum), Infantry School (Mhow), Defence Services Staff College, Army War College, Mhow, Centre for UN Peacekeeping (CUNPK), New Delhi, and National Defence College, New Delhi.

== Career ==
Lt. General Negi joined the National Defence Academy (India) in 1977, and Indian Military Academy in 1980. He was commissioned into an Infantry Battalion (16 Dogra Regiment) in June 1981. In more than 39 years of military career, he has tenanted important command and staff appointments. He has commanded his Battalion in Western Sector during Op Parakram, Assam Rifles Sector in Assam/ Arunachal Pradesh under 'Operation Rhino/ Operation Orchid' under Counter Insurgency operations as a brigadier, a Division as a major general in High Altitude areas of Jammu and Kashmir, and Strike Corps at, Ambala. He then took over as Deputy Commander-in-Chief, Strategic Forces Command as lieutenant general before assuming the appointment of Commandant of the Indian Military Academy on 1 February 2020.

Lt. General Negi has been an instructor in Infantry School, Mhow, and has also been a part of Indian Military Training Team at Bhutan. He has served with United Nations as Deputy Commander and Chief of Staff of a Multi-National Indian Brigade in Congo (MONUC) where he was awarded United Nations Force Commander's commendation.

As a major to lieutenant colonel, Negi has served in various operational areas along the line of control, high altitude areas, counter insurgency operations and with Ladakh Scouts. He has served extensively in Jammu and Kashmir and in Ladakh. He has been Colonel GS of Division and has served as colonel, as a brigadier and as a major general in Military Secretary's Branch, Perspective Planning and Military Operations Directorates at the Integrated Headquarters of Ministry of Defence (Army), New Delhi. He was the delegation leader of the first Tri-Services Observer Delegation (INDRA-2017) with the Russian Defence Forces at Vladivostok, Russia.

As the Commandant of the Indian Military Academy, he had presided over the Spring Term-20 Award ceremony on 10 June 2020 and conducted the 146th Passing out Parade on 13 July 2020 while following all the COVID-19 safety and social distancing protocols. The Chief of the Army Staff General Manoj Mukund Naravane, PVSM, AVSM, SM, VSM, ADC was the reviewing officer for the Passing out Parade.

During his career he has been awarded the Vishisht Seva Medal in 2007 and 2012, the Yudh Seva Medal as the General Officer Commanding of 8 Mountain Division in 2015, the Ati Vishisht Seva Medal in 2016 and the Param Vishisht Seva Medal as Deputy Commander-in-Chief at Strategic Forces Command in 2020.

== Personal life ==
Lt. General Negi hails from Chamoli, Garhwal, Uttarakhand. He enjoys golf, travelling, yoga and photography. He is married to Mrs. Kusum Negi and has two sons.

== Honours and decorations ==

Param Vishisht Seva Medal		Ati Vishisht Seva Medal	
Yudh Seva Medal	Vishisht Seva Medal (Bar)		Samanya Seva Medal
Special Service Medal	Siachen Glacier Medal	Operation Vijay Medal	Operation Parakram Medal
Sainya Seva Medal	High Altitude Service Medal	Videsh Seva Medal	50th Anniversary of Independence Medal
30 Years Long Service Medal	20 Years Long Service Medal	9 Years Long Service Medal	United Nations Medal

== Dates of rank ==
Insignia	Rank	Component	Date of rank
	Second Lieutenant	Indian Army	13 June 1981
	Captain	Indian Army	1 June 1984
	Major	Indian Army	5 June 1992
	Lieutenant-Colonel	Indian Army	24 November 1997
	Colonel	Indian Army	1 November 2001
	Brigadier	Indian Army	21 August 2009
	Major General	Indian Army	1 February 2014
	Lieutenant-General	Indian Army	1 July 2016

Military offices
Preceded by Sanjay Kumar Jha	Commandant, Indian Military Academy; 1 February – 30 September 2020	Succeeded by Harinder Singh
Preceded by Manoj Mukund Naravane	General Officer Commanding Kharga Corps; January 2017 – January 2018	Succeeded by Alok Singh Kler
Preceded by Shaukin Chauhan	General Officer Commanding, 8 Mountain Div; November 2013 – January 2015	Succeeded by Manoj Pandey
