= Divya (name) =

Divya is an Indian name derived from the Sanskrit word दिव्य (divyá) / दिव्या (dhivyā́)

== Persons with the first name Divya ==
- Divya Bharti (1974–1993), Bollywood film actress
- Divya Bhatnagar (1986–2020), Indian television actress
- Divya Chouksey (1990–2020), Indian actress
- Divya Desai (born 1986), Indian actress
- Divya Deshmukh (born 2005), Indian chess grandmaster
- Divya Dutta (born 1977), Indian actress
- Divya Dwivedi (active from 2006), Indian philosopher
- Divya Gautam (born 1991), Indian academic and politician
- Divya Ganesh (born 1994), Indian actress
- Divya Gopikumar (born 1983), South Indian actress known as Abhirami
- Divya Kumar, several people
- Divya Maderna (born 1984), Indian politician from Rajasthan
- Divya Narendra (born 1982), US-American businessman, CEO of Subzero
- Divya Palat, Hindi actress and theatre producer and director
- Divya Singh (born 1982), basketball player for the Indian national team
- Divya Tewar (born 1984), Indian judoka
- Divya Venkatasubramaniam Iyer, Indian actress known as Kaniha
- Divya Victor, Tamil American poet (fl.2009 -)
- Divyaa Unni, Malayalam film actress

== Persons with the surname Divya ==
- Anny Divya, Indian pilot
- Shalini Divya, Indian chemist and entrepreneur in New Zealand

== Fictional characters named Divya ==
- Divya (Sonia Agarwal), the female lead from the movie Kaadhal Kondein (2003).
- Divya Katdare (Reshma Shetty), a supporting character in the TV series Royal Pains.
- Divya Rathore (Simran Jehani), sister of the male lead from the movie Khoobsurat (2014).

== Others ==
- Divyabharathi, an Indian actress

== See also ==
- Divya (disambiguation)
