= Divya =

Divya may refer to:

- Divya (name), a Hindu first name meaning "divine"
- Athulya Ravi, born Divya, Indian actress
- Divya Bhaskar, a Gujarati newspaper
- Divya Desams, the Sri Vaishnava shrines glorified by the Alvars
- Divya Prabha Eye Hospital, eye care hospital in Kerala
- Divya Shakti, 1993 Bollywood film
- Divya Prabandham, a collection of 4,000 Tamil Hindu verses
- Divya (rural locality), a rural locality (a settlement) in Perm Krai, Russia

== See also ==
- Deyyam (disambiguation)
