= Sami Khan (general) =

Indian army lieutenant general

Lieutenant General Sami Khan PVSM, SM
- Military career
- Allegiance: India
- Branch: Indian Army
- Rank: Lieutenant General
- Unit: 4 Madras
- Commands: Central Army; XV Corps; 4 Madras
- Awards: Param Vishisht Seva Medal; Sena Medal

Lieutenant General Sami Khan, PVSM, SM was a General in the Indian Army who served as the 13th General officer Commanding-in-Chief of the Central Command, Lucknow. Gen Khan had earlier served as the Commandant of the National Defence Academy, Khadakwasla.

== Early life ==
Lt. Gen Sami Khan was born in Hyderabad, India, and was commissioned in the 4th Battalion, The Madras Regiment, Indian Army. He was a member of the royal family of Rampur, and attended Sherwood College, Nainital, and The Scindia School, Gwalior before attending the National Defence Academy.

== Military career ==
2 Lt Sami Khan joined the Indian Army on 10 January 1951 and was commissioned into the 4th Battalion the Madras Regiment. In a career spanning 38 years, Lt Gen Khan served with the United Nations in Congo, and was awarded the Sena Medal. He then attended the Defence Services Staff College, Wellington, and later became the Deputy Assistant Quarter Master General of the 69 Brigade in Chaubatiya (now in Uttaranchal). In 1965, Gen Khan joined the 4th Madras Regiment in the Operational Theatre – Maharajke (near Sialkot). After this, Gen Sami Khan joined the battalion as a second in command to Dharchula, and took over the battalion in 1967. Thereafter, the General took the battalion to Trivandrum and left for an instructor's job at the Central Command, Lucknow as the GSO 1 (Ops) Air. After spending two-and-a-half to three years as such, he was posted as a full colonel and instructor to the Infantry School Mhow (near Indore in Madhya Pradesh). Having been elevated to Brigadier, he was given the task of an instructor at the Higher Command Wing at the Army War College, Mhow from where he picked up his rank as a Major General and commanded a division in Arunachal Pradesh. Prior to taking over as the 13th Army Commander of the Central Command in 1987, Gen Khan had a stint in the NDA as Commandant, and also commanded a corps in Jammu and Kashmir. He was awarded with a Param Vishisht Seva Medal (PVSM) by the Indian government for his services to the nation. He was also recently posthumously awarded the Madhav Award 2016 by his alma mater, The Scindia School, Gwalior where he had spent 4 formative years from 1944 to 1948.
