= Vipin Indira Panabhan Nayar =

Air Marshal, India

Air Marshal Vipin Indira Panabhan Nayar AVSM VM
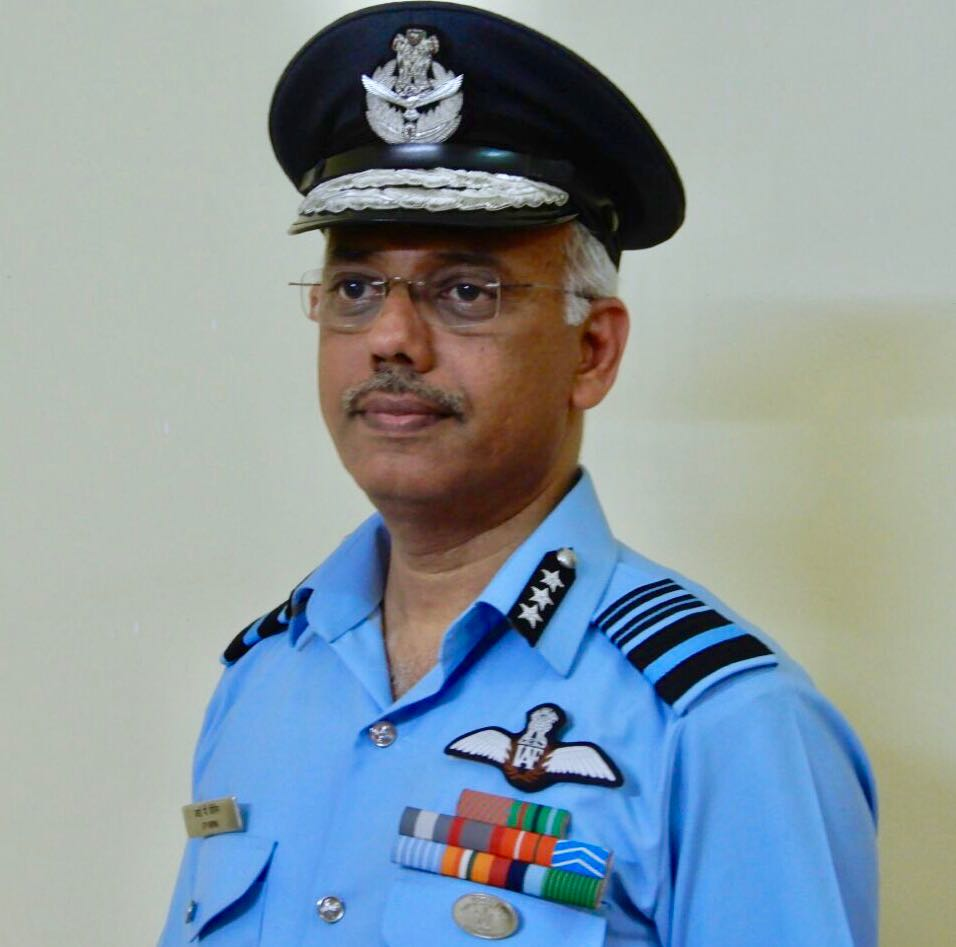

Commandant, Air Force Academy
- In office 1 August 2020 – 31 July 2021
- Preceded by: Jonnalagedda Chalapati
- Succeeded by: Sanjeev Kapoor

Personal details
- Awards: Ati Vishisht Seva Medal; Vayu Sena Medal

Military service
- Allegiance: India
- Branch/service: Indian Air Force
- Years of service: 4 June 1982 – 31 July 2021
- Rank: Air Marshal
- Unit: No. 41 Squadron
- Commands: Air Force Academy; National Defence Academy; No. 41 Squadron; No. 33 Squadron
- Service number: 16829

Air Marshal Vipin Indira Panabhan Nayar, AVSM, VM is a retired officer of the Indian Air Force. He served as the 28th Commandant of the Air Force Academy. He assumed the office on 1 August 2020 succeeding Air Marshal Jonnalagedda Chalapati. He served till his superannuation on 31 July 2021

== Early life and education ==
Vipin Indira Panabhan Nayar is an alumnus of Sanik School, Kazhakootam from 1978 batch. He is a graduate of the National Defence Academy, Pune, Defence Services Staff College, Wellington and National Defence College, New Delhi.

== Career ==
Vipin Indira Panabhan Nayar was commissioned in the flying branch of the Indian Air Force. In a career spanning over 39 years, he has as more than 6,000 hours of flying experience across various types of transport aircraft, trainer aircraft and gliders.

He has held various instructional tenures include stints at National Defence Academy, Pune, Basic Flying Training School, Prayagraj and Fixed Wing Training Faculty at Air Force Station Yelahanka, Bengaluru.

As Wing Commander, he served as the Commanding Officer of the No. 41 Squadron at Jodhpur.

As Group Captain, he served as the Commanding Officer of the No. 33 Squadron at Sulur.

As Air Commodore, he served as the Principal Director for Operations, Transport and Helicopters. Later, he served as the Air Officer Commanding of 3 Wing in New Delhi. Afterwards, he served as the Principal Director for Space operations.

As Air Vice Marshal, he served as the Senior Directing Staff (Air) at the National Defence College, New Delhi.

After his promotion to Air Marshal, he served as the Commandant of the National Defence Academy till 15 December 2019.

Later, he took over as the Senior Air Staff Officer of the Central Air Command on 16 December 2019 from Air Marshal Richard John Duckworth and served till 31 July 2020.

He was appointed as the Commandant of the Air Force Academy, where he served till his superannuation on 31 July 2021 and was succeeded by Air Marshal Sanjeev Kapoor.

== Honours and decorations ==
During his career, Vipin Indira Panabhan Nayar has been awarded the Ati Vishisht Seva Medal in 2021 and Vayu Sena Medal in 2003 for his service.

Ati Vishisht Seva Medal	Vayu Sena Medal

Military offices
Preceded by Jonnalagedda Chalapati	Commandant, Air Force Academy; 1 August 2020 – 31 July 2021	Succeeded by Sanjeev Kapoor
Preceded by Richard John Duckworth	Senior Air Staff Officer - Central Air Command; 16 December 2019 - 31 July 2020	Succeeded by Dilip Kumar Patnaik
Preceded by Jasjit Singh Kler	Commandant, National Defence Academy; 9 April 2018 – 15 December 2019	Succeeded by Asit Mistry
