= Divya Kumar =

Divya Kumar may refer to:

- Divya Khosla Kumar (born 1987), Indian actress, producer and director
- Divya Kumar (singer), Indian Bollywood playback singer
- Divya Ajith Kumar, officer of the Indian Army
