= Deyyam =

Deyyam (lit. 'ghost') may refer to:

- Deyyam (1996 film), an Indian Telugu-language horror film
- Deyyam (2021 film), an Indian Telugu-language horror film

== See also ==
- Divya (disambiguation)
