= Stella Maris College, Chennai =

Women's college in Chennai, India

Stella Maris College
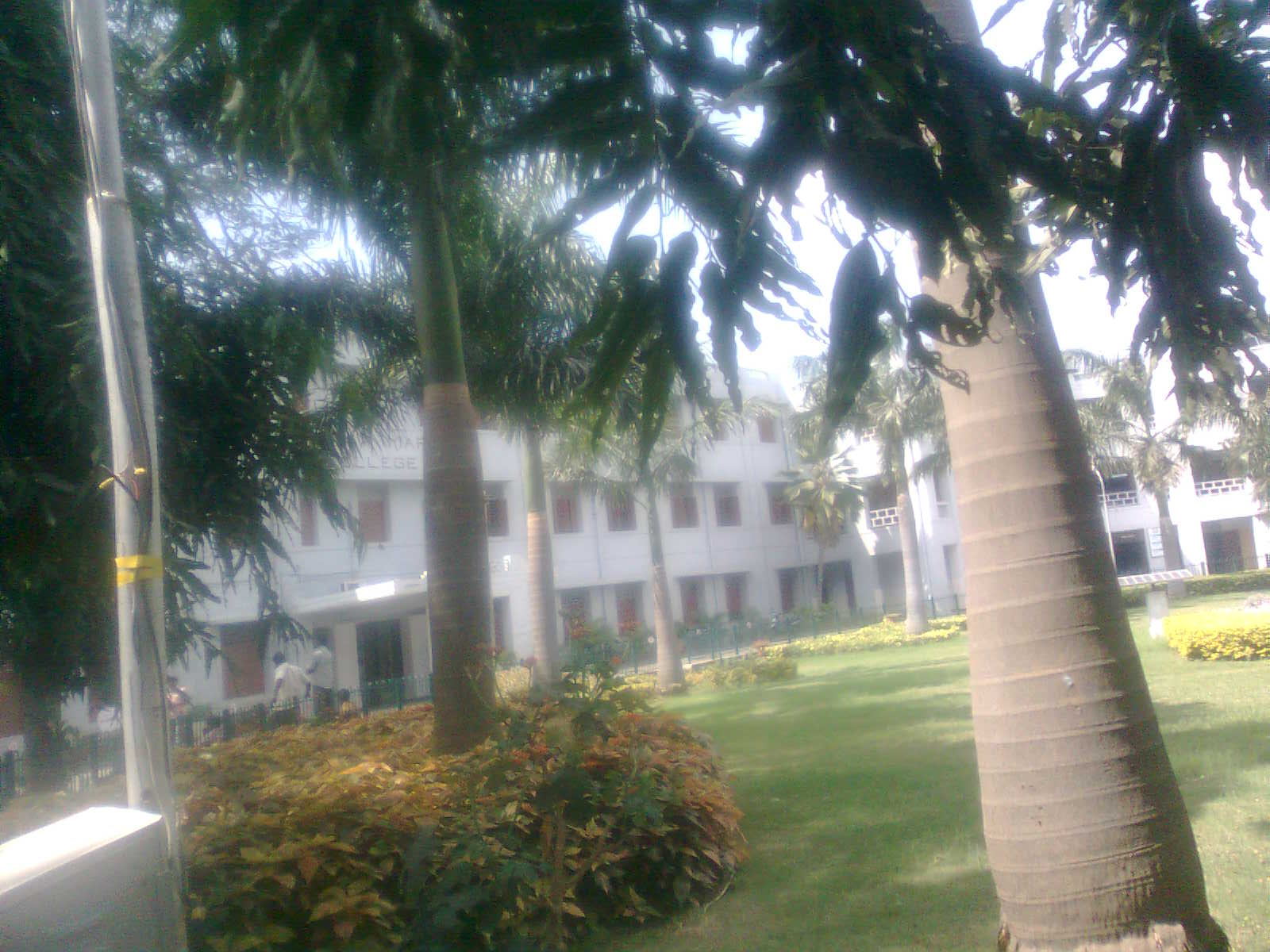
- Motto: Truth Charity
- Type: Autonomous
- Established: 15 August 1947; 79 years ago
- Affiliations: University of Madras
- Principal: Dr. Sr. Stella Mary fmm
- Students: 5800
- Location: Chennai, Tamil Nadu, India; 13°2′49″N 80°15′13″E
- Campus: Urban
- Colours: Blue and Gold
- Website: https://stellamariscollege.edu.in

Stella Maris College is an institution of higher education for women in Chennai, India. It is an autonomous college affiliated to the University of Madras and is partly residential. The college, which is under the direction of the Society of the Franciscan Missionaries of Mary, is a minority institution.

It has five hostels – Snehalaya, Our Lady's, Klemens, St. Josephs and Nava Nirmana.

It is ranked 30th among colleges in India by the National Institutional Ranking Framework (NIRF) in 2024.

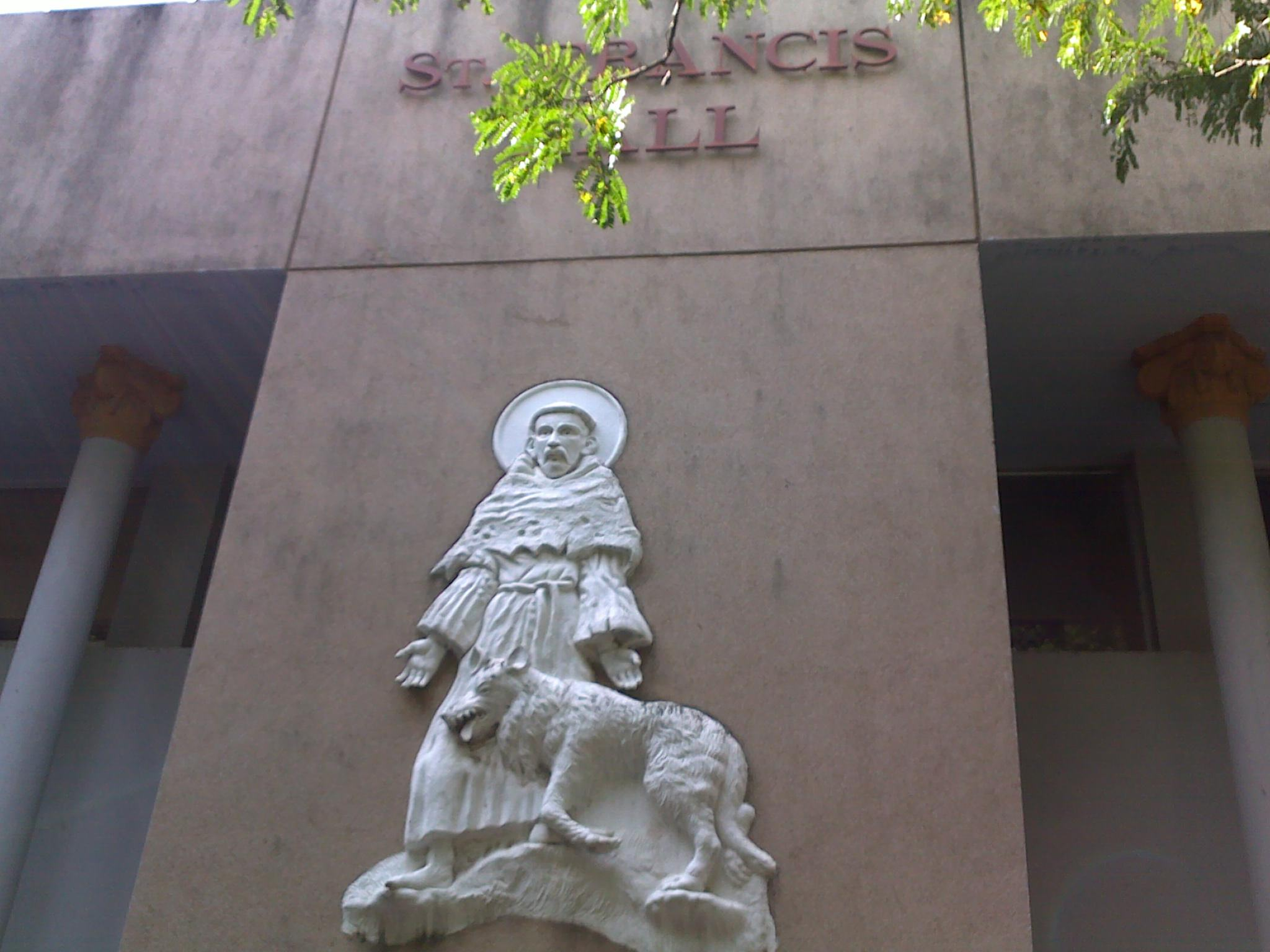
Exterior of St Francis Hall, Stella Maris

== Departments ==
- Advanced Zoology and Biotechnology
- Bioinformatics
- Biotechnology
- Business Administration
- Chemistry
- Commerce
- Computer Applications
- Economics
- English
- History & Tourism
- Information Technology
- International Studies
- Languages
- Mathematics
- Physics
- Plant Biology and Plant Biotechnology
- Psychology
- Public Relations
- Religion and Value Education
- Social Work
- Sociology
- Visual Arts
- Vocational Programmes:
  - Sustainable Energy Management
  - Food Processing and Quality Control
- Diploma Courses:

Computer Science
Medical Laboratory Technology

== Conservation ==
As of 2014, the college has undertaken around twelve environmental initiatives including light-emitting diode cluster lights, solar-powered streetlights, source segregation, vermi-composting, and waste water recycling plant. In January 2014, the college opted for green energy with the installation of a 50-kilo watt roof-top solar power plant on its campus. The plant, installed by Omega Natural Polarity Private Limited at a cost of ₹ 5 million, has 200 solar panels and caters to six percent of the total power requirement on the campus, powering lights and fans in the college.

== Notable alumni ==
- Alarmel Valli, classical dancer
- Anita Coleman, researcher
- Anju Bhargava, political operative
- Anuradha Menon, Comedian
- Bala Devi Chandrashekar, Bharatanatyam dancer
- Brindha Sivakumar, Singer
- Divya Ajith Kumar, army officer
- G. Thilakavathi IPS, police officer and Tamil writer
- Geeta Menon, academic, educator; Dean of New York University
- Jayalalithaa, actress-turned-politician, former Chief Minister of Tamil Nadu
- Malini Parthasarathy, editor, The Hindu
- Lekha Washington, actress
- Manjima Mohan, Actress, Award winner.
- Samantha Ruth Prabhu, actress
- Savitha Sastry, dancer
- Shweta Mohan, singer
- Christabelle Howie, Miss India 1991
- Sheela Murthy, U.S. immigration attorney
