= Nagendra Singh (general) =

Lieutenant General Nagendra Singh AVSM YSM SM
- Military career
- Allegiance: India
- Branch: Indian Army
- Service years: 1989 — present
- Rank: Lieutenant General
- Unit: Punjab Regiment
- Commands: X Corps; Indian Military Academy

Nagendra Singh is a three-star general of the Indian Army, who is the Commandant of the Indian Military Academy. An officer of the Punjab Regiment, he had previously served as the General Officer Commanding the X Corps, often known as Chetak Corps. He is a decorated officer of the army, being awarded Ati Vishist Seva Medal, Yudh Seva Medal and the Sena Medal.
