= Sanjeev Kapoor (air marshal) =

Air Marshal, Indian Air Force

Air Marshal Sanjeev Kapoor AVSM, VM
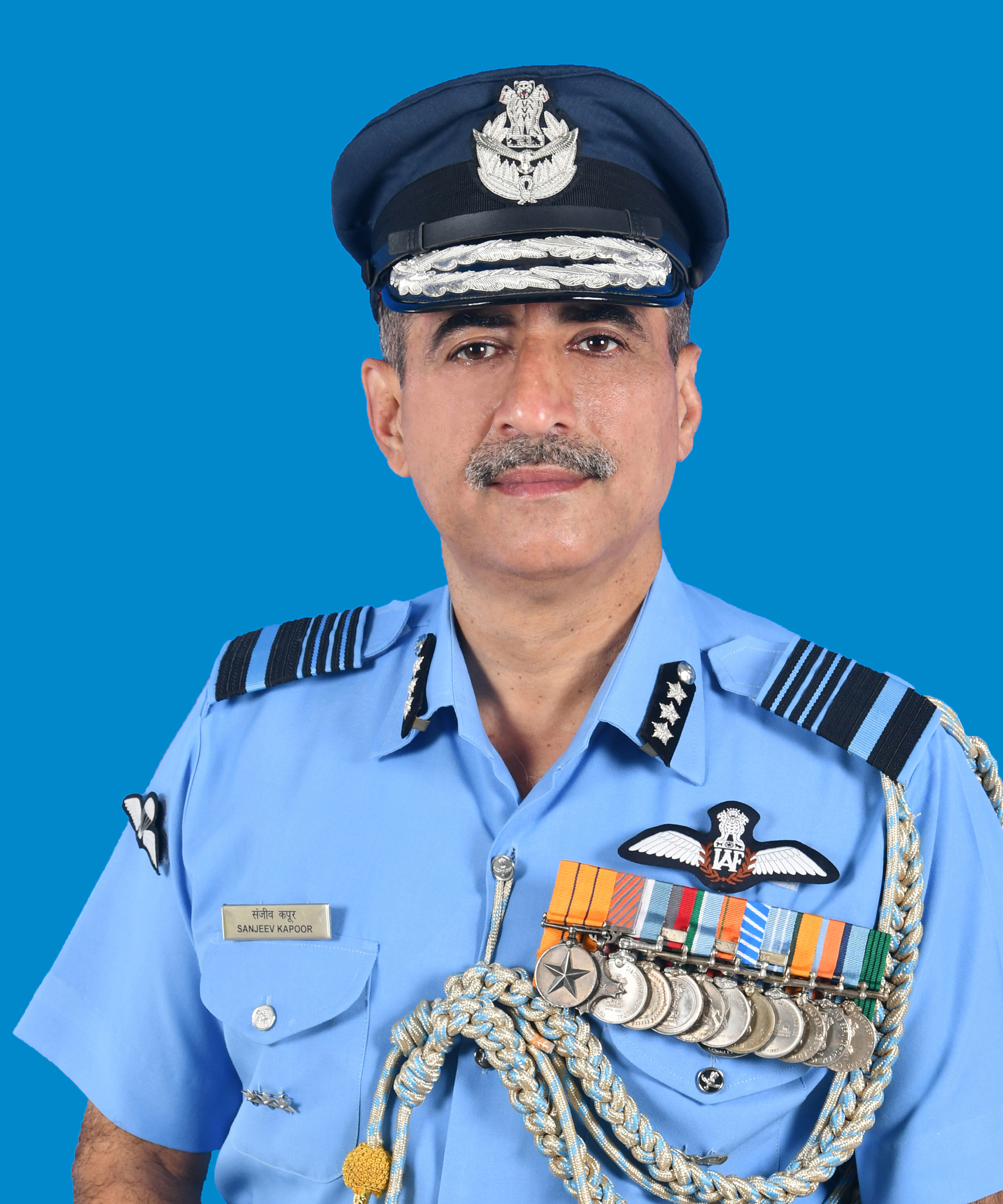

Personal details
- Awards: Ati Vishisht Seva Medal; Vayu Sena Medal

Military service
- Allegiance: India
- Branch/service: Indian Air Force
- Years of service: 6 December 1985 - 30 November 2023
- Rank: Air Marshal
- Unit: No.78 Squadron
- Commands: National Defence Academy; Air Force Academy
- Service number: 18089

Air Marshal Sanjeev Kapoor, AVSM, VM is a retired officer of the Indian Air Force. He served as the Director General – Inspection and Flight Safety. He took over the office on 1 May 2022, succeeding Air Marshal Gurcharan Singh Bedi.

== Early life and education ==
Sanjeev Kapoor is an alumnus of Rashtriya Military School Chail, National Defence Academy, Defence Services Staff College, Flying Instructor School and College of Defence Management. He has an elder daughter who is serving in the air force and a younger son who is a submariner in the Indian navy.

== Career ==
Sanjeev Kapoor was commissioned in the flying branch of the Indian Air Force in December 1985. He has over 7800 hours of incident free flying on various trainer, transport and strategic aircraft.

He is one of the stalwarts in Aerial Refueling Operations of the Indian Air Force and has flown the Airborne Warning and Control System (AWACS) aircraft. He had commanded the only Air to Air Refueling squadron No.78 Squadron of the Indian Air Force and has commanded a large operational base with strategic assets.

In his career spanning over three decades, he has held important staff appointments such as director (air-to-air refueling) and principal director (operations) at Air Headquarters. He has vast experience in high-altitude and VVIP flying, air-to-air refuelling and combat operations.

He served as the commandant – Air Force Academy from 1 August 2021 to 31 October 2021.

Before taking the charge as Director General – Inspection and Flight Safety, he served as the Commandant – National Defence Academy till 31 March 2022.

He superannuated on 30 November 2023 and was succeeded by Air Marshal Markand Ranade.

== Honours and decorations ==
During his career, Sanjeev Kapoor has been awarded the Vayu Sena Medal (VM) and the Ati Vishisht Seva Medal.

Ati Vishisht Seva Medal	Vayusena Medal

Military offices
Preceded by Gurcharan Singh Bedi	Director General - Inspection and Flight Safety; 1 May 2022 – Present	Succeeded by Markand Ranade
Preceded by Vipin Indira Panabhan Nayar	Commandant - National Defence Academy; 1 November 2021 — 31 March 2022	Succeeded by Ajay Kochhar
Preceded by Vipin Indira Panabhan Nayar	Commandant – Air Force Academy; 1 August 2021 – 31 October 2021	Succeeded by Sreekumar Prabhakaran
