= Sheela Murthy =

American lawyer (born 1961)

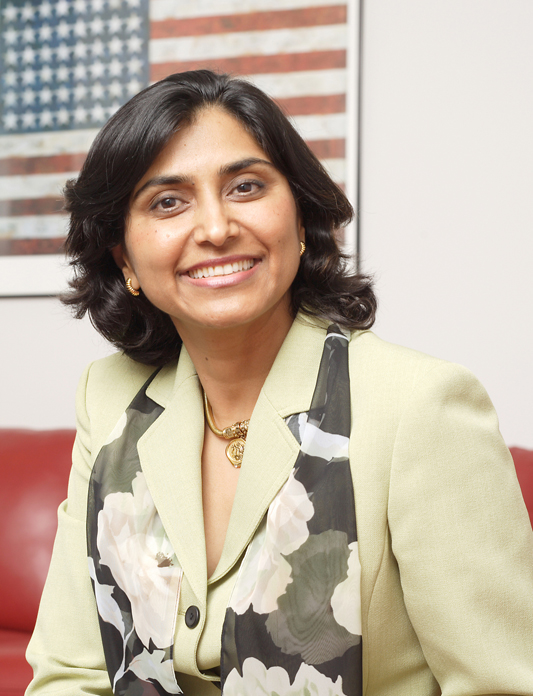
- Born: 12 October 1961 (age 64); Baroda, Gujarat, India
- Citizenship: United States
- Education: Harvard Law School
- Occupation: Attorney
- Spouse: Vasant Nayak

Sheela Murthy (born 12 October 1961) is an Indian-American lawyer, entrepreneur, and philanthropist, perhaps best known as founder and president of Murthy Law Firm, based in Owings Mills, Maryland.

A native of India, Murthy and her husband, photographer and media specialist Vasant Nayak, established the MurthyNayak Foundation to channel their philanthropic contributions to nonprofits that serve the needs of women, children, and immigrants, particularly in education and healthcare. Murthy has been recognized for her philanthropic work. She serves on the boards of several nonprofits in the Baltimore–Washington area and elsewhere in the northeastern United States. She is a frequent speaker on immigration law, and on entrepreneurship and motivation, leadership, and women's issues.

== Early life ==
Murthy was born in Baroda (now known as Vadodara), India, in 1961, the second of three daughters. Her father, HMS (Srinivas) Murthy, was an officer in the Indian Defense Forces. The family lived in modest circumstances, especially in her early years, and moved often as her father was transferred throughout India.

Although Sheela's father was adamantly against the idea of her pursuing a career in law, she now credits her father's constant reminders about her responsibility to help the less fortunate for sparking her interest in law, social justice, and philanthropy.

== Education ==
Murthy was admitted to Stella Maris College in Chennai, where she majored in history and minored in political science. She graduated in 1982.

During college at Stella Maris, Murthy says her interest in social justice led to her involvement in anti-dowry marches and other work to secure the rights of women and girls. It also strongly influenced her academic and career choices. Against her parents' wishes, Murthy enrolled in the Bachelor of Laws program at the University Law College at Bangalore University.

As a law student, she competed in the Jessup International Moot Court competition and was all-India champion, and her team subsequently placed second in the world at the Jessup Moot Court competition in New York. Murthy graduated from law school in 1985 at the top of her class of 1,500 students.

While in New York for the moot court competition, Murthy decided to apply for the Master of Laws (LLM) program at Harvard Law School. She spent the next year teaching French at the Alliance Française and the Institute of Hotel Management in Bangalore, while she awaited the results of her Harvard application. Around the same time, she met her future husband, Vasant Nayak, when she attended his photo exhibition at the Alliance Française.

Murthy was admitted to Harvard, where she worked nights as a security guard to help cover her living expenses. She went on to graduate from Harvard's LLM program in 1987.

== Early career ==
After Harvard, Murthy practiced real estate and corporate law at White & Case, a major law firm in New York City. There she lived the life of a young associate attorney, working "12 to 14 hours a day, often seven days a week." As Murthy explained, she found working in Manhattan to be "emotionally draining," and disliked working at a big law firm because "you're nothing but a billable-hour machine."

In 1989, Murthy and her husband Vasant moved to Baltimore, where she continued to practice real estate and business law at a medium-sized law firm. At the same time, Murthy was developing expertise in immigration law, forced to learn it as she went through the protracted bureaucratic process—four years, in her case—to secure green cards for herself and her husband. Murthy helped her employer to set up an immigration law practice, and did the same when she moved to another firm in 1992, where she began in earnest to build up an immigration law practice of her own.

Murthy attributes her interest in immigration law, in part, to the difficulties she faced during her own immigration process. Murthy found the process time-consuming, expensive, and discouraging. As she explained in a 2009 interview, "my [immigration] lawyer never really communicated with me…except the one instance when he had to tell me he was hiking his fee! I thought that if a lawyer treats a fellow-lawyer like this, I dread to think how he'll treat others. I said I bet I can make an impact if I get in."

== Murthy Law Firm ==
In May 1994, Murthy left her employer to start her own, solo practice immigration law firm: The Law Office of Sheela Murthy. For the first several months, she worked from the dining room table of her home. Eventually she moved to a tiny office in Owings Mills, Maryland that included a photocopier and receptionist that she shared with several other businesses.

The Murthy.com website was launched by Murthy's husband, Vasant Nayak, who, at the time, ran the new graduate program in digital arts at the Maryland Institute College of Art in Baltimore. Murthy was initially skeptical about the value of online communication, but she credits her husband for convincing her to grow her business via the Internet. As Murthy explained, "He kept following me around, saying, 'It's the wave of the future! I'll do the work!' And finally I thought, fine, if it's free, I guess I can live with it. I've got nothing to lose." The website went online in the fall of 1994. The firm's website is now the most viewed legal website not just in the United States but in the world.

Murthy's firm grew quickly, in part because of her early adoption of using the Internet for educational and outreach efforts. Murthy established a significant presence on the web, sharing news and information about the immigration process, and building her name and reputation in the process.

Beyond her online presence, Murthy further raised her stature by writing about immigration law and serving frequently as a commentator for professional publications and seminars. In 1999, Murthy became actively involved with the American Immigration Lawyers Association (AILA), and has taken several leadership roles in that organization over the years.

She admits that, when she first launched her firm, she struggled with employee retention because she was too demanding, expecting her employees to work fourteen-to-fifteen hour days every day of the week. But, as time went on, she recognized that this was unreasonable, and that her employees "...needed to have a healthy work life balance and had all the right to go back to their kids and families."

By 2005, The Law Office of Sheela Murthy had expanded to the point that the firm changed its doing business as name to the Murthy Law Firm. As of 2023, the firm has about 100 employees at its headquarters office in Owings Mills, Maryland, and another 30 at its affiliate, Murthy Immigration Services Private Limited (MISPL), headquartered in Chennai and with satellite offices in Hyderabad and Mumbai, India. According to Chambers Global, an international law-firm rating agency, the firm is now one of the world's leading U.S. immigration law firms. The Firm has been recognized as an AV rated law firm, which is the highest possible rating for lawyers and law firms, for its legal acumen and ethical standards, by Martindale Hubbell based on peer reviews.

== Philanthropy ==
In 2001, Murthy and her husband established the MurthyNayak Foundation to channel their financial resources into socially transformative projects designed to improve the lives of women, children, and immigrants in their native India and in their adopted homeland, the United States. Education, health care, nutrition, and the rights of women and children are among the main focal points of these efforts. The MurthyNayak Foundation previously provided free media for nonprofits through its production company, Site2Sight, producing websites, documentary films, and other promotional materials for free to the nonprofits it serves. Its current focus is to support education and immigrants and support and mentor photographers and photo education in South Asia through Photo South Asia to help photo students and photographers in south Asia, including in Bhutan, Bangladesh, India, Nepal, Myanmar, Pakistan, and Sri Lanka.

Murthy serves on various non-profit boards like JHPIEGO, the Baltimore Museum of Art, the Maryland Institute College of Art, and the MurthyNAYAK Foundation. Previously, Murthy had served on boards for a number of organizations, including Cancer Treatment Centers of America, Girl Scouts of Central Maryland, Maryland Chamber of Commerce, Stevenson University, and the Harvard Law School Alumni Board of Visitors, among others. She also served on the boards of United Way International and the United Way of Central Maryland, which named her the 2009 Philanthropist of the Year. In December 2017, Murthy was named the president of the Washington, D.C. chapter (representing the District of Columbia, Maryland and Virginia) of The Indus Entrepreneurs (TiE).

== Awards and honors ==
The 2013 edition of Corporate Immigration recognized Murthy as one of the world's top corporate immigration attorneys. Among her other honors, she was named to the 2011 Top 50 Most Influential Marylanders and the Maryland Top 100 Women's Circle of Excellence by The Daily Record, a Maryland Business publication. Murthy's firm was among the 2012 Top 100 Minority Business Enterprises, and Murthy received the 2010 Business Philanthropy Award from the Baltimore Business Journal. She also received the 2010 Small Business of the Year Award from the Maryland Chamber of Commerce. In 2008, Sheela Murthy was the first woman to become a member of the United Way of Central Maryland's Million Dollar Roundtable. In 2012, The Daily Record recognized Murthy as one of "Maryland's Most Admired CEOs," and the Maryland Entrepreneur Quarterly named her Business Entrepreneur of the Year.

In 2012, The Children's Guild, a nonprofit school for children with special needs, presented Murthy with the Sadie Award for her philanthropy and humanitarianism. During the awards ceremony, the children and staff of the school performed an original musical production showcasing Murthy's life. In 2009, Murthy was named Entrepreneur of the Year by Ernst & Young. She has been recognized as among the Best Lawyers in America (c) as voted by her peers over the years. In 2023, Murthy was inducted into the MD Business and Civic Hall of Fame by the Baltimore Sun for her lifetime contributions to the law, business, philanthropy and the community. In the same year, 2023, the MD Chamber of Commerce inducted Murthy into its Hall of Fame.
