= Anju Bhargava =

American federal executive, banker, and civic leader

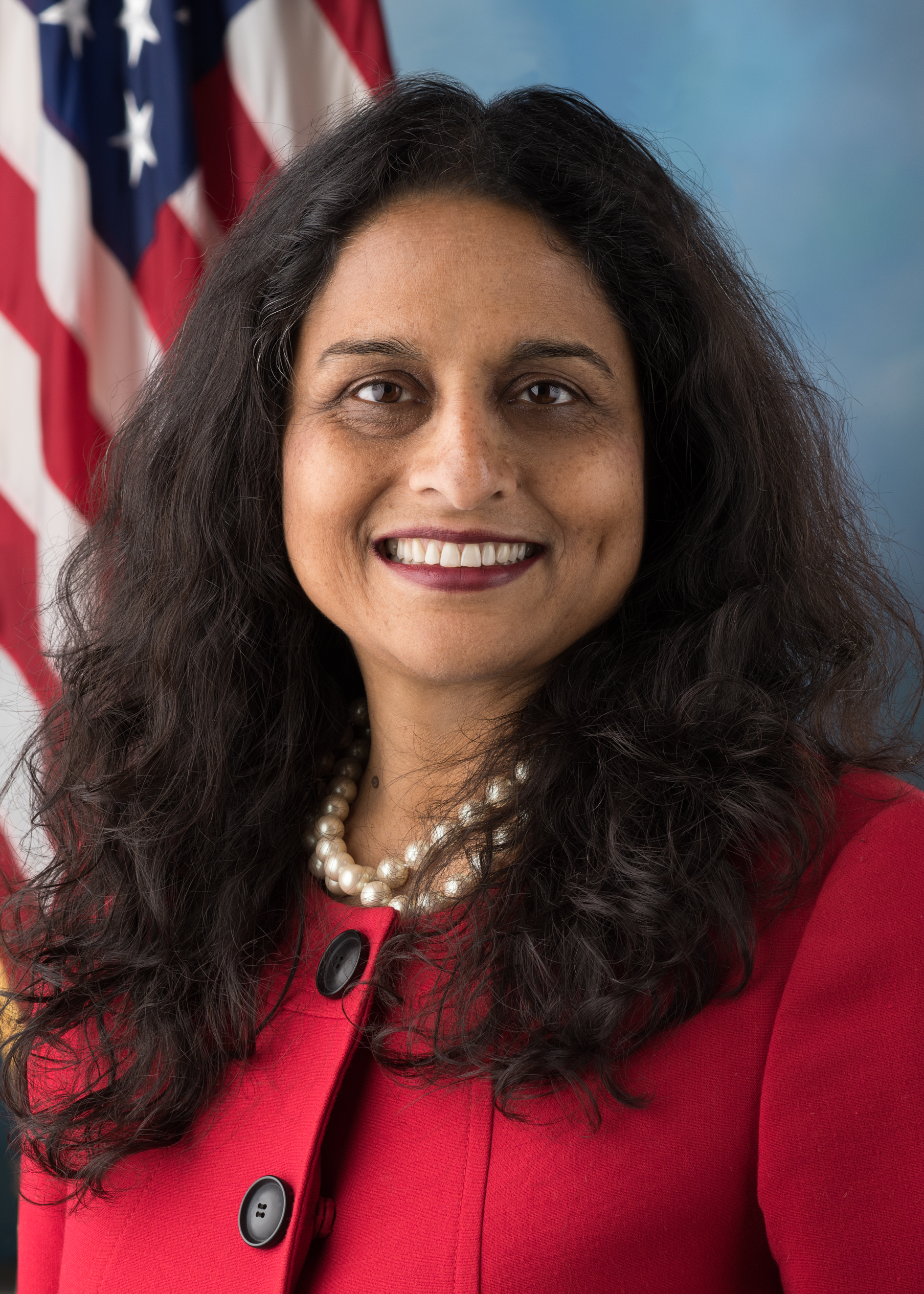
- Bhargava in 2023
- Born: India
- Occupations: Federal executive, banker, ordained Hindu minister, civic leader
- Years active: 1980s–present
- Employers: Centers for Medicare & Medicaid Services (former Chief Risk Officer); Social Security Administration (former Deputy Chief Strategy Officer); Office of the Comptroller of the Currency (former Senior Operational Risk Expert); Bank of America, Bear Stearns, BB&T, IBM Global Services, Chase Manhattan Bank
- Known for: Member of President Barack Obama's Advisory Council on Faith-Based and Neighborhood Partnerships; Founder of Hindu American Seva Communities; Community Builder Fellow, Clinton Administration; First Chief Risk Officer, Centers for Medicare & Medicaid Services
- Title: Founder, Hindu American Seva Communities
- Awards: Named one of "10 Inspiring Women Religious Leaders" by HuffPost (2011); Distinguished service recognitions from U.S. federal agencies and civic organizations
- Website: hinduamericanseva.org

Anju Bhargava is a retired American federal executive, former senior banker, ordained Hindu minister, and civic leader. She is the founder of Hindu American Seva Communities (HASC), a national nonprofit advancing Hindu and Dharmic faith-based community service and social justice. She was the only Hindu American appointed to President Barack Obama's inaugural Advisory Council on Faith-Based and Neighborhood Partnerships (2009), and subsequently to the Department of Homeland Security's Faith-Based Security and Communications Advisory Committee. In federal service she was the first Chief Risk Officer of the Centers for Medicare & Medicaid Services (2014) and Deputy Chief Strategy Officer of the Social Security Administration (2015).

== Education ==
Bhargava attended Stella Maris College at the University of Madras. After immigrating to the United States, she earned an MBA from Rutgers University and received further training at Harvard University's Kennedy School of Government and American University.

== Banking career ==
Bhargava began her professional career in banking, holding senior positions at Bank of America, Bear Stearns, BB&T Bank, IBM Global Services, Fleet/NatWest Bank, and Chase Manhattan Bank, with a focus on global business transformation, organizational development, and risk management.

Her research on NatWest USA's loan-loss experience was published as "Knowledge: The Most Valuable Intangible" in The RMA Journal (June 2001), a publication of the Risk Management Association. The article documented a study of more than $1 billion in charge-offs and received recognition from the Office of the Comptroller of the Currency. She served as a Fellow in the Department of Accounting, Business Ethics and Information Systems at Rutgers Business School and taught organizational management and diversity at Rutgers Graduate School of Business. She published a second article, "Examining Best Practices in Operational Risk Management," in The RMA Journal (October 2014), written after her tenure as senior operational risk expert at the Office of the Comptroller of the Currency.

Bhargava developed an executive education program called Chakravyuhu (also known as the Labyrinth), designed to mentor women in India and the United States in advancing their corporate careers globally.

== Community organizing ==
Bhargava was among the founding members of Asian Indian Women of America (AIWA), established in 1981 as one of the earliest Indian women's organizations in North America. In 1983, AIWA members attended a White House briefing during the Reagan administration at which Asian American women were formally recognized as a constituency. In 1985, AIWA supported the establishment of Manavi, among the first shelters for South Asian domestic violence survivors in North America. In 1986, AIWA co-organized a job fair for underserved communities in New York City.

Also in 1981, Bhargava formed Asian Indians in Livingston, New Jersey, to help Indian Americans integrate into their broader community while celebrating their cultural identities. She was the first Indian American to participate in Livingston's political process, led the community's first Memorial Day Parade participation, and was the first Hindu to join the town's Interfaith Clergy Association.

In 2006, Bhargava organized the first Asian Indian festival in Winston-Salem, North Carolina — called Utsava (Sanskrit for "festival") — held during Asian Pacific American Heritage Month. The event received a proclamation from Mayor David Katz and drew approximately 5,000 people.

== Clinton administration — Community Builder Fellowship ==
Bhargava was the only Indian American selected for the Community Builder Fellowship, a U.S. Department of Housing and Urban Development (HUD) initiative under President Clinton (1998–2000). She was one of approximately 400 Community Builders selected from over 8,000 applicants nationwide, and one of just six in New Jersey. To take up the two-year fellowship, she left her position as vice president at Fleet Bank after eighteen years in banking.

Bhargava completed an Asian American Pacific Islander Outreach — Summary of Assessment for the Federal Inventory (for New Jersey), which informed subsequent government and community programs. She was recognized by Partnership for New Jersey and Governor Christine Todd Whitman for this work.

== Obama administration ==
=== Advisory Council on Faith-Based and Neighborhood Partnerships ===
On April 6, 2009, President Obama announced Bhargava as one of nine appointees completing the 25-member Advisory Council on Faith-Based and Neighborhood Partnerships. She was the only Hindu American and the only representative of an Eastern religious tradition on the council. The Pew Research Center confirmed she served on the council's interreligious dialogue and cooperation task force and advised the Obama administration on the President's June 2009 address in Cairo.

Bhargava brought greater awareness of issues facing Dharmic communities — Hindus, Buddhists, Sikhs, and Jains — to the White House and the country. In July 2009, Bhargava published "U.S. Community-Building in a Dharmic Environment" in The Wall Street Journal, articulating the need for Dharmic communities to "transform, mobilize talent and resources, and institutionalize the service, or seva, component" in American civic life. Following a year of deliberations, the council's full recommendations were published in A New Era of Partnerships: Report of Recommendations to the President (March 2010), submitted to the White House Office of Faith-Based and Neighborhood Partnerships. She co-authored a community assessment report titled Call to Serve: Hindu American Community Building Through Seva, presented to the President and senior administration officials.

=== Hindu American Seva Communities ===
In 2009, following her White House appointment and under the guidance of the White House Office of Faith-Based and Neighborhood Partnerships, Bhargava founded Hindu American Seva Charities (later renamed Hindu American Seva Communities) as a national movement for Hindu and Dharmic faith-based community service. HASC became a service partner with the Corporation for National and Community Service and collaborated with the Oxford Research Centre for Hindu Studies on the BhumiSeva initiative to encourage temples to adopt environmentally sustainable practices.

HASC developed community service tools including UtsavSeva, connecting Hindu festivals to social justice themes, and SevaVotes.org, a civic engagement initiative for Dharmic Americans. HASC's approach received support from major spiritual leaders including the Dalai Lama, Pujya Swami Dayananda Saraswati, Sri Sri Ravi Shankar, Mata Amritanandamayi, ISKCON, BAPS Swaminarayan, and Chinmaya Mission.

Bhargava co-hosted four conferences with the White House to advance Dharmic seva and social justice. The first, held July 29–31, 2011 at the Eisenhower Executive Office Building, was titled "Energizing Dharmic Seva: Impacting Change in America and Abroad." At that conference, the Bhagavad Gita was placed on the White House podium, described as a historic first. The second conference in April 2012 was described by Rabbi Joshua Stanton as "a sacred moment and one of conscious transition" for Dharmic religious communities in America.

Through its White House work, HASC advocated for re-authorization of the Violence Against Women Act (VAWA), addressed Bhutanese refugee issues, supported the appointment of the first Hindu American military chaplain, and partnered with the Department of Education on the President's Interfaith and Community Service Campus Challenge.

=== DHS Advisory Committee ===
Bhargava served on the Department of Homeland Security's Faith-Based Security and Communications Advisory Committee under Secretary Janet Napolitano. The committee published its findings as the Faith-Based Security and Communications Advisory Committee Final Report (May 2012), in which Bhargava is listed as a member. She also contributed to the FEMA publication Developing Emergency Operations Plans for Houses of Worship (2013), reflecting her expertise bridging federal emergency management and faith-based community leadership.

== Federal executive career ==
Prior to her appointments at CMS and SSA, Bhargava served as Senior Operational Risk Expert at the Office of the Comptroller of the Currency (OCC), U.S. Department of the Treasury. In 2014, Bhargava was appointed the first Chief Risk Officer of the Centers for Medicare & Medicaid Services (CMS). In 2015 she became Deputy Chief Strategy Officer of the Social Security Administration.

Bhargava contributed to the interagency Playbook: Enterprise Risk Management for the U.S. Federal Government (2016), jointly issued by the Chief Financial Officers Council (CFOC) and the Performance Improvement Council (PIC), developed through collaboration among risk practitioners from more than twenty federal agencies.

== Religious leadership and interfaith work ==
Bhargava, a Vipassana meditator, is an ordained Hindu minister and chaplain and a Vedantic teacher, and is among a small number of female Hindu clergy in the United States. She delivered what is believed to be the first invocation by a Hindu woman at the New Jersey State Assembly.

She contributed the essay "Sitayanam: A Woman's Journey of Strength" to a collection published by Georgetown University's Berkley Center for Religion, Peace, and World Affairs. She has served as a trustee of the Council for a Parliament of the World's Religions and on the board of the Odyssey Network.

In 2025, Bhargava participated in the Jewish Federations of North America's International Lions of Judah Conference and co-authored an essay on Hindu-Jewish solidarity with Rabbi Joshua Stanton.

== Recognition ==
In 2011, HuffPost named Bhargava one of its "10 Inspiring Women Religious Leaders." In 2012, she was invited to introduce Vice President Joe Biden at the White House Diwali celebration. In 2023, Religion News Service profiled her as part of a rising cohort of Hindu American leaders engaging publicly in civic and spiritual life.
