= Passing out (military) =

Completion of a course in military education

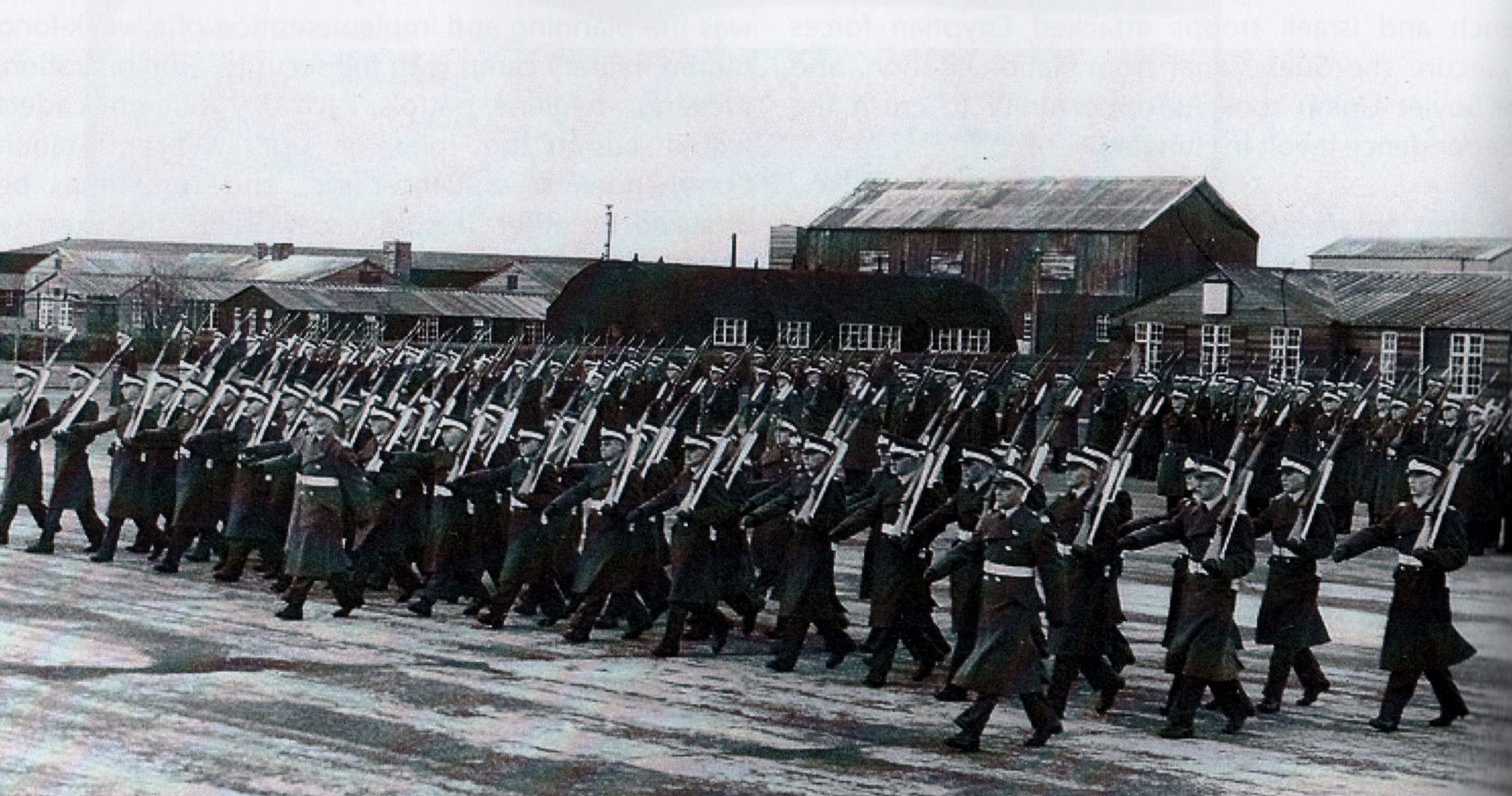
Passing Out Parade of members of No.1 Officer Cadet Training Unit, RAF Jurby, January 1957.

Passing out is the official graduation ceremony following the completion of a course by military or other uniformed service personnel at their respective training school, college, or military academy, largely in Commonwealth nations. Soldiers, sailors, or airmen take part in a passing out military parade upon completion of a basic training course. The military parade during the 'passing out' ceremony may also consist of military bands, and other displays of synchronisation discipline such as a flypast, which may also include aerobatics.

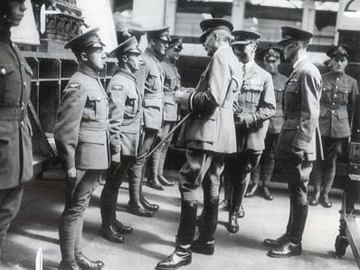
Marshal of the Royal Air Force Trenchard inspecting apprentices during a passing out parade at Groves and Henderson Barracks at RAF Halton.

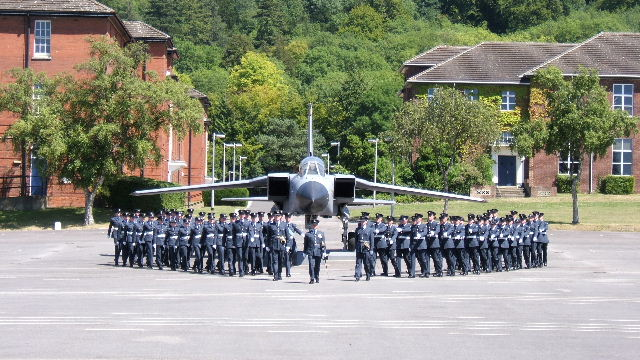
Passing Out Parade, RAF Halton, in July 2006.

== Name ==
The parade may also be referred to as a 'Marching out' parade, as it is at the Army Recruit Training Centre at Kapooka in Australia. It is also known as 'Pass off' parade, as in the case of the Royal Army Physical Training Corps and Passing out 'Ceremony' in the case of Warsash Maritime Academy of the British Merchant Navy. It is also known as 'Sovereign's Parade' at Royal Military Academy Sandhurst, when inspected by a member of the British royal family or another royal. Since 1964, the Fire and Rescue NSW conducts a passing out parade on course completion.

== Reviewing officer and guests ==
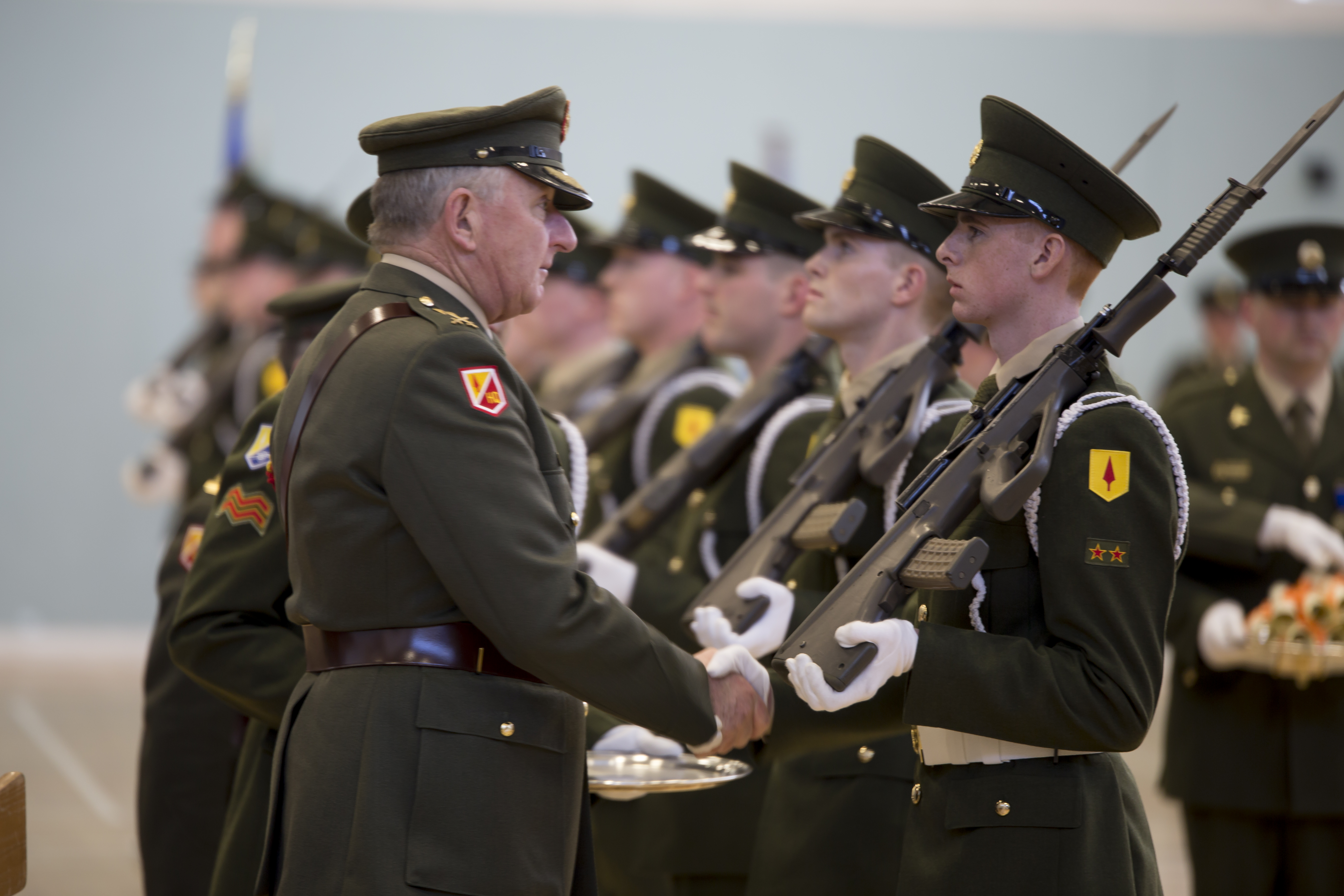
A reviewing officer during an Irish Defence Forces passing out in 2014.

A 'reviewing officer', usually a senior officer, reviews the parade and hands out any medals to cadets who have excelled. Militaries around the world usually allow civilian guests including parents and next of kin, to attend the passing out parade. Dignitaries may also be present, as was the case at Royal Military Academy Sandhurst in 2010, when the British Prime Minister David Cameron was present to witness the event. Other dignitaries at the event included relatives of graduating cadets such the President of Yemen and the Prime Minister of Bahrain.

The chief guest at the military passing out parade of Napuka Secondary School, Cakaudrove, in August 2019, was the senior most female officer of the military forces of the Republic of Fiji. In 2019, Vice President Mike Pence spoke at the graduation ceremony at the United States Military Academy, West Point.

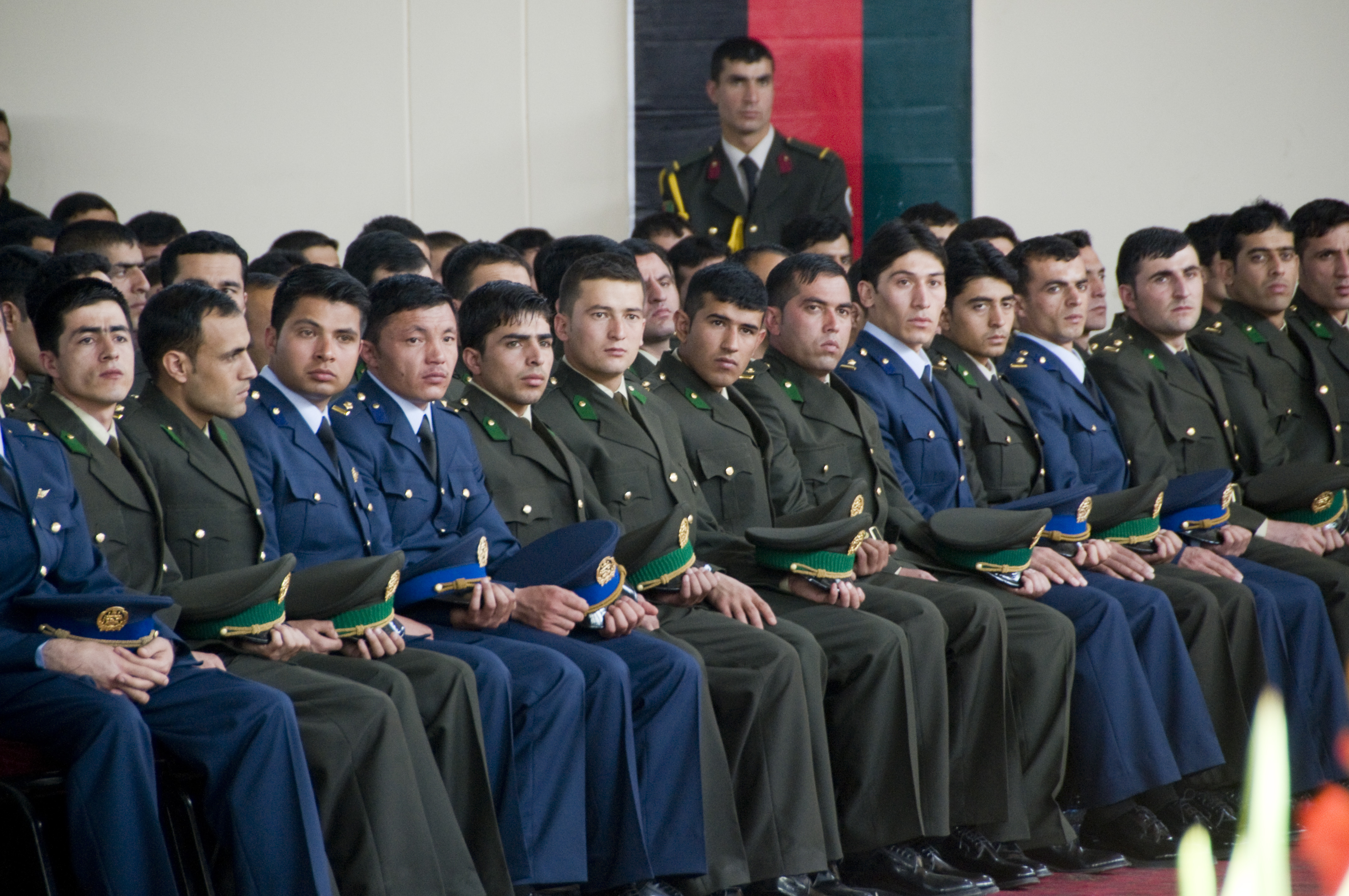
The National Military Academy of Afghanistan class of 2010 listens as Afghan President Hamid Karzai gives a speech during their graduation ceremony in 2010.

In 2019, the reviewing officer for the 136th Passing out Parade (POP) at the Indian Military Academy (IMA) was Lieutenant General Cherish Mathson. Having such senior officers present is a morale booster for the cadets. During the passing out parade, a dignitary may also make a speech, as was the case during the passing out parade in IMA in 2007, when Prime Minister Manmohan Singh addressed the cadets and guests.

== Traditions ==
=== Royal Military Academy Sandhurst ===
The passing out at Royal Military Academy Sandhurst, known as the Sovereign's Parade, is conducted three times a year. One of the main ceremonies during the parade is Trooping the Colour. Various awards and honours are presented to cadets who have excelled. This includes the Queen's Medal, the Overseas Sword, and the MacRobert Sword.

=== Sword of Honour ===
The passing out can also consist of traditions such as presentation of a 'Sword of Honour', as in the case of Sandhurst and Indian and Pakistan military academies. In 2010, for the first time in the history of the Officers Training Academy, India, a female cadet, Divya Ajith Kumar, was presented the sword of honour.

=== Shipping of stripes ===
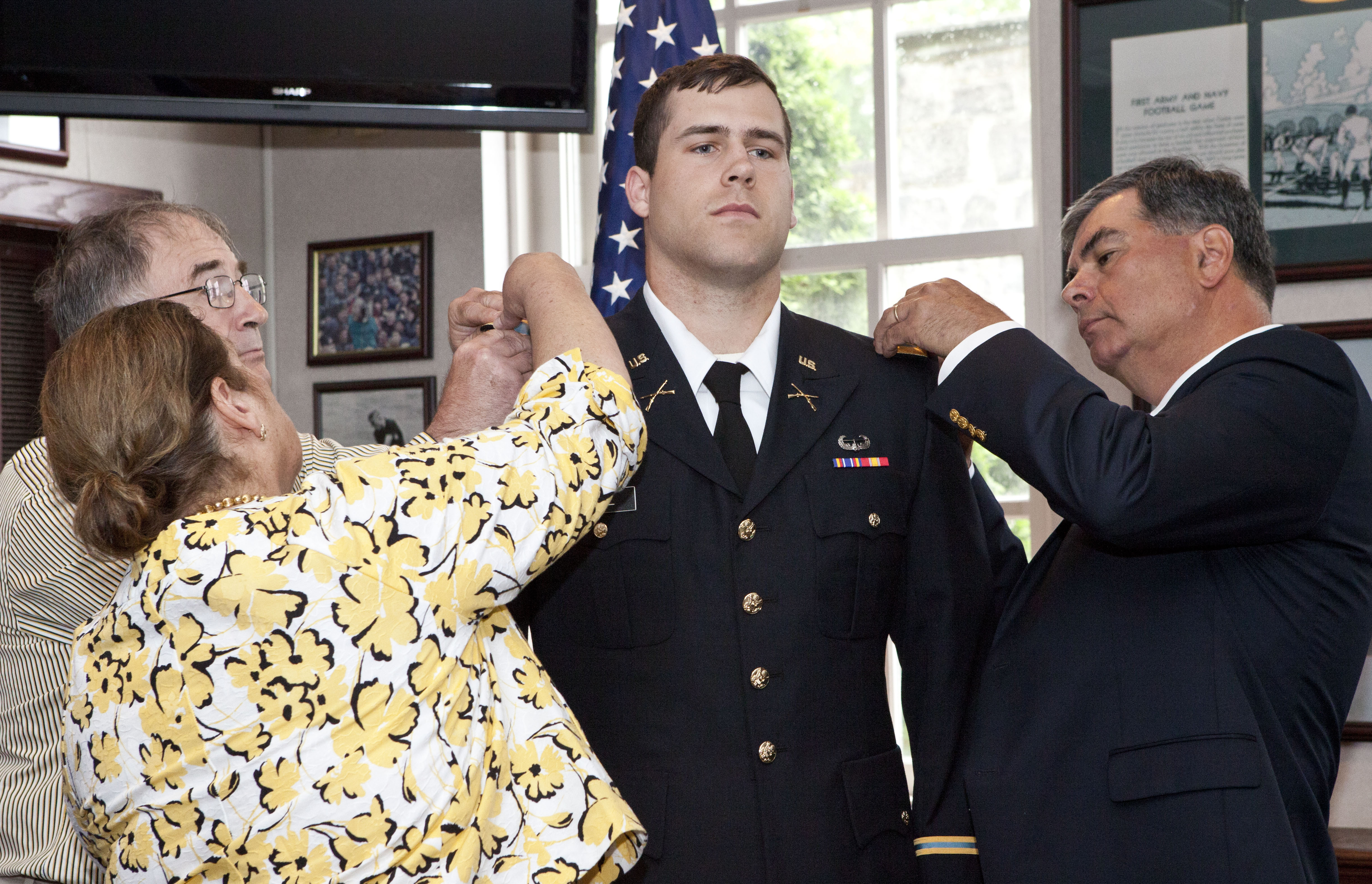
Friends and family pin rank during the commissioning ceremony after the United States Military Academy Graduation and Commissioning Ceremonies for the Class of 2013 at the Michie Stadium in West Point.

Another tradition that happens during the 'passing out' is the 'Shipping-of-Stripes', as in the case of the Indian Naval Academy. During this ceremony, senior officers and the relatives of the passing out cadets 'ship' the epaulettes (commonly known as 'Stripes') on the uniform. This represents the graduation of the cadets into officers.

=== Music ===
A common song that is played during the passing out, especially in Commonwealth countries, is Auld Lang Syne, a Robert Burns poem. The military parade during the 'passing out' may also consist of military bands. At the Indian Military Academy, before the cadets begin the passing out parade ceremony, the band plays a melody (aarti), allowing the cadets to pray to their respective god.

=== Hat toss ===
The first recorded hat toss in the United States of America was in 1946 at United States Military Academy, West Point. After the hat toss, children are allowed to take one hat each. Cadets fill the hats with notes, snapshots, and even money for the children.

At some places such as the Indian Military Academy, 'flinging-of-cap' has been stopped. The tradition of 'cap-flinging' during the passing out parade has a long past; the tradition starting well before India's Independence from British rule. It was stopped in India in 2010 as some people found it disrespectful for the caps to touch the ground.

=== Other ===
Other traditions include the adjutant leading the parade to crack a joke to lighten the atmosphere, as in the case of the Indian Military Academy passing out parade. At the Royal Military Academy Sandhurst, the parade finale includes the mounted adjutant riding up the steps of the Old College on his horse (the origin of this tradition is unknown). At the Indian Military Academy, the finale is the 'antim pag' (final step), where cadets take the last step into Chetwode Hall.

== Popular culture ==
The passing out parade is depicted in the 1980s book The Passing-out Parade: A Play by British writer Anne Valery. In the 2004 Bollywood movie Lakshya, Hritik Roshan, upon completing his course at the Indian Military Academy, takes part in a passing out parade.

== Passing out around the world ==
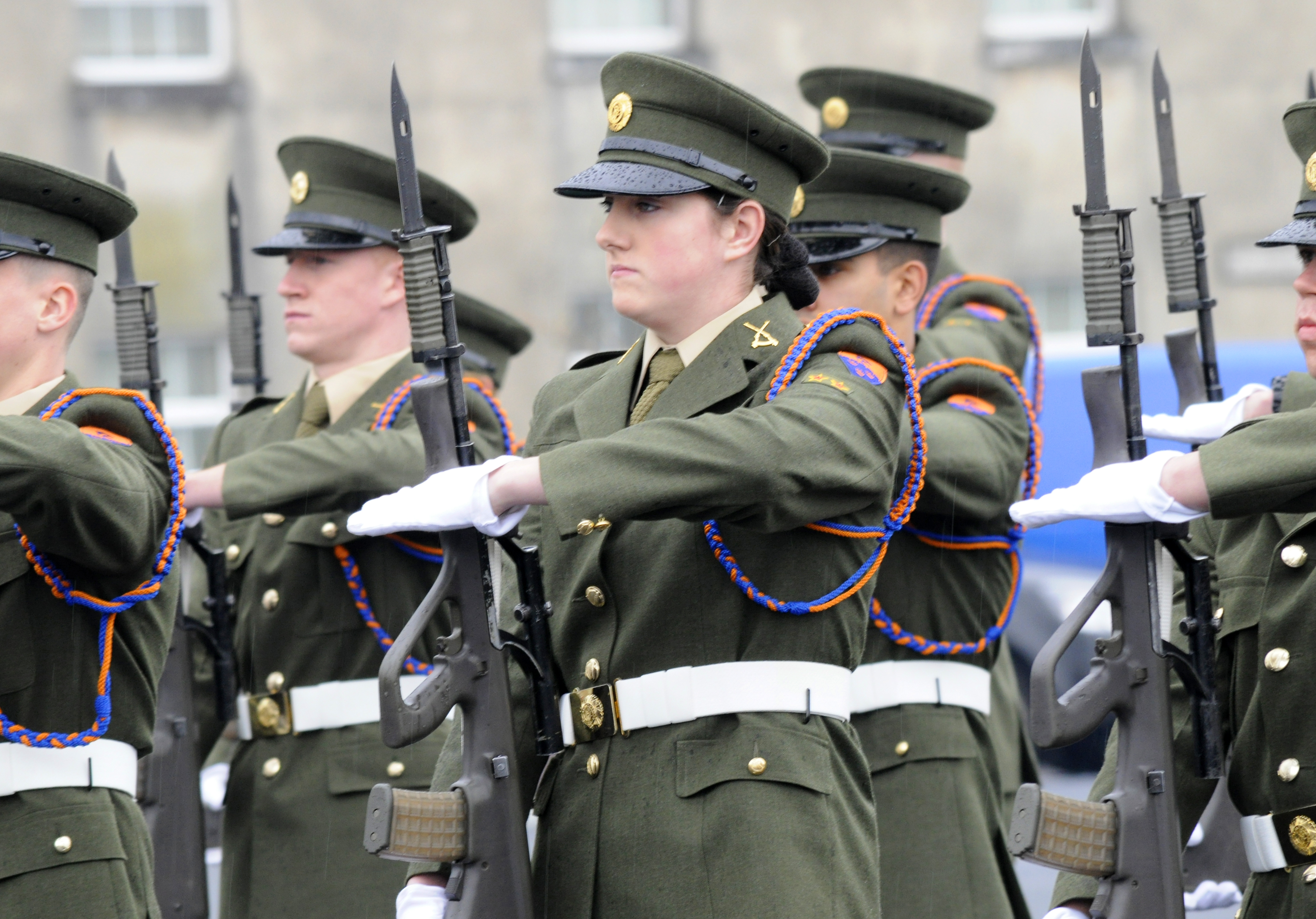
Passing out, Irish Defence Forces.

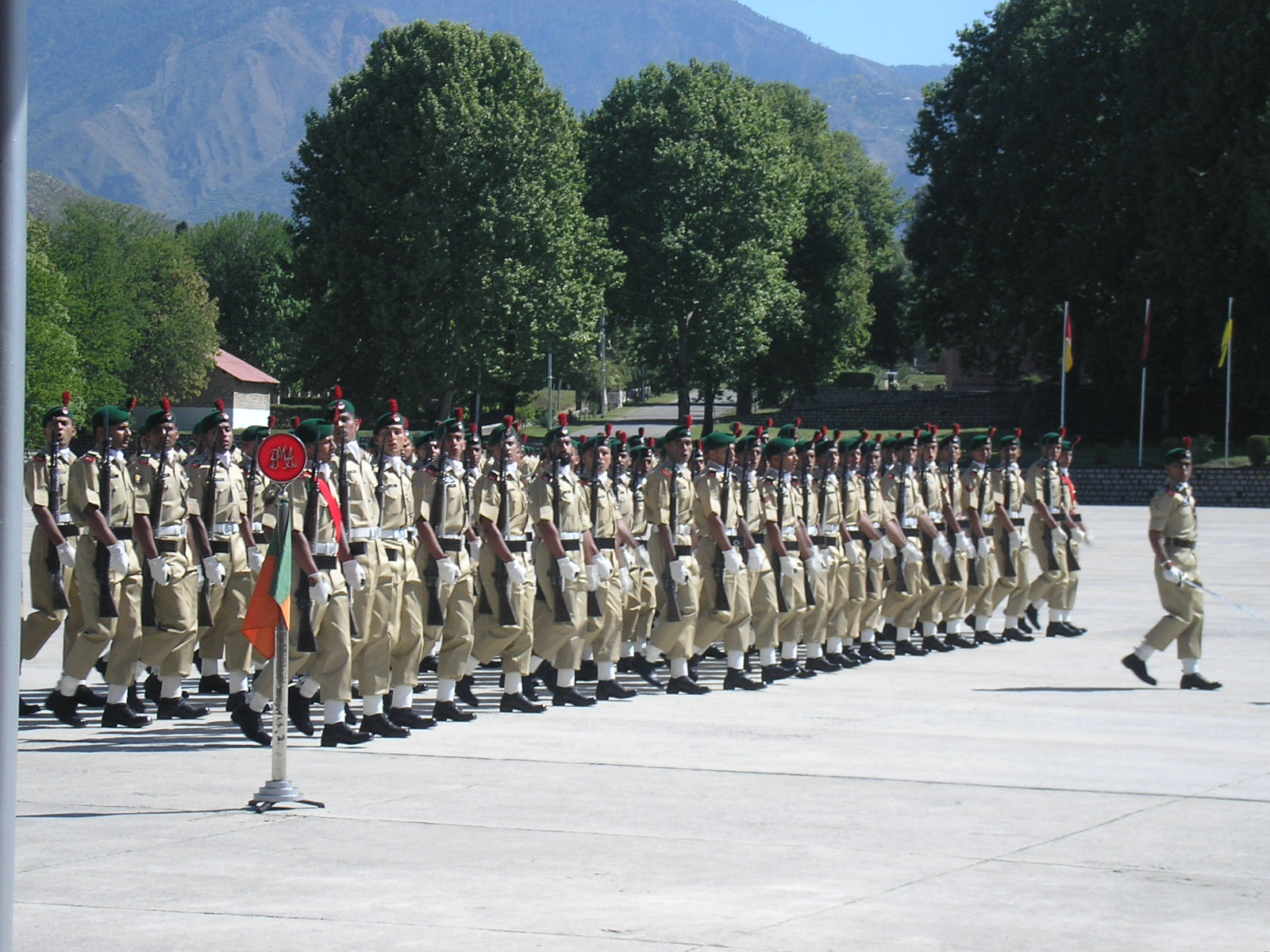
A passing out parade at Pakistan Military Academy, Kakul.

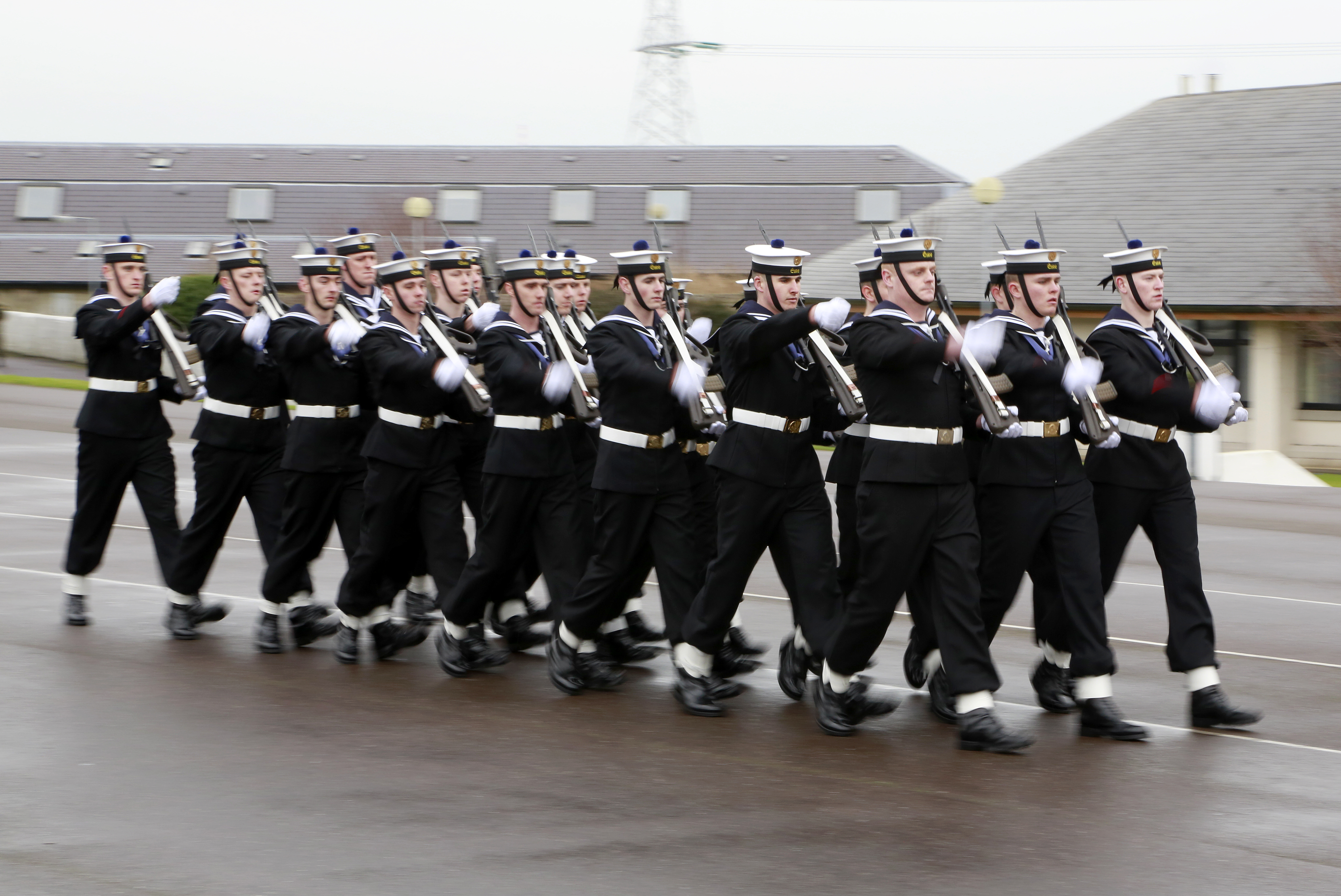
Naval service passing out, Ireland.

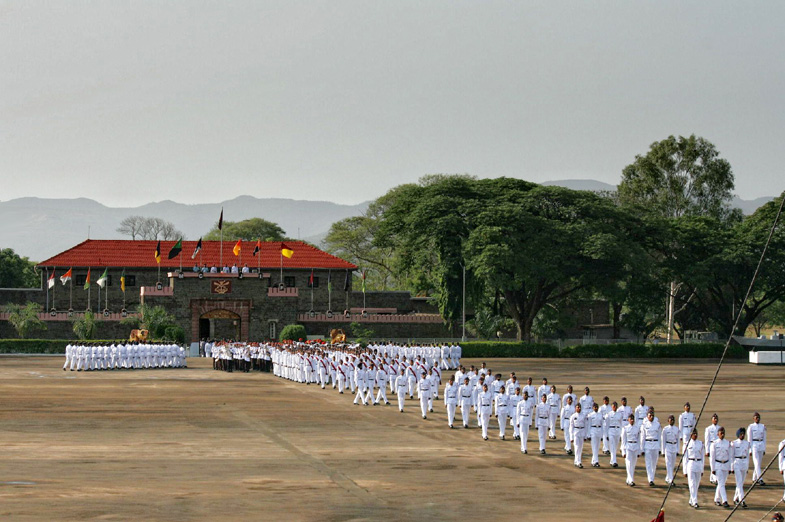
Passing out Parade, National Defence Academy, India.

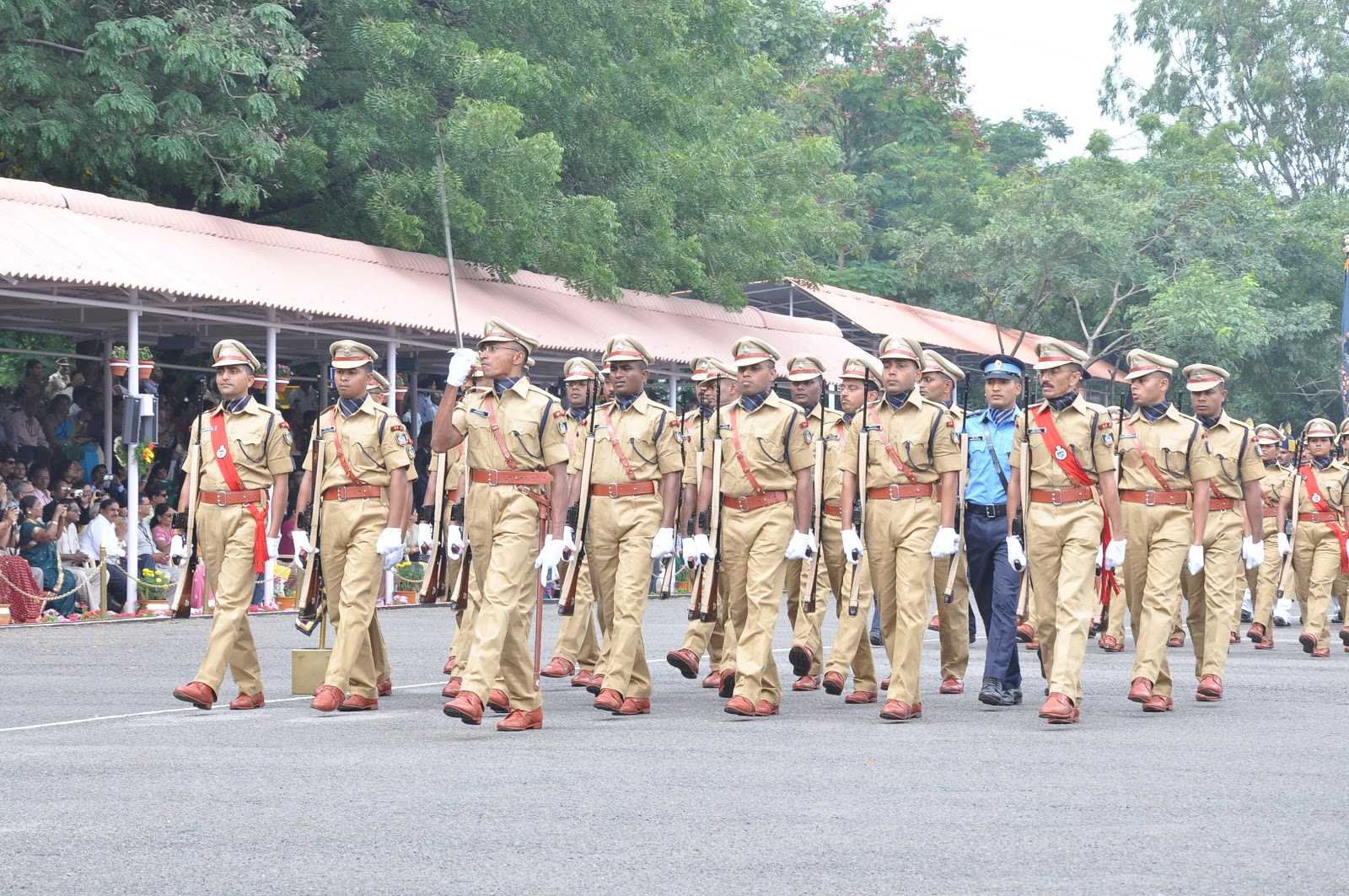
Passing out Parade at Sardar Vallabhbhai Patel National Police Academy, India.

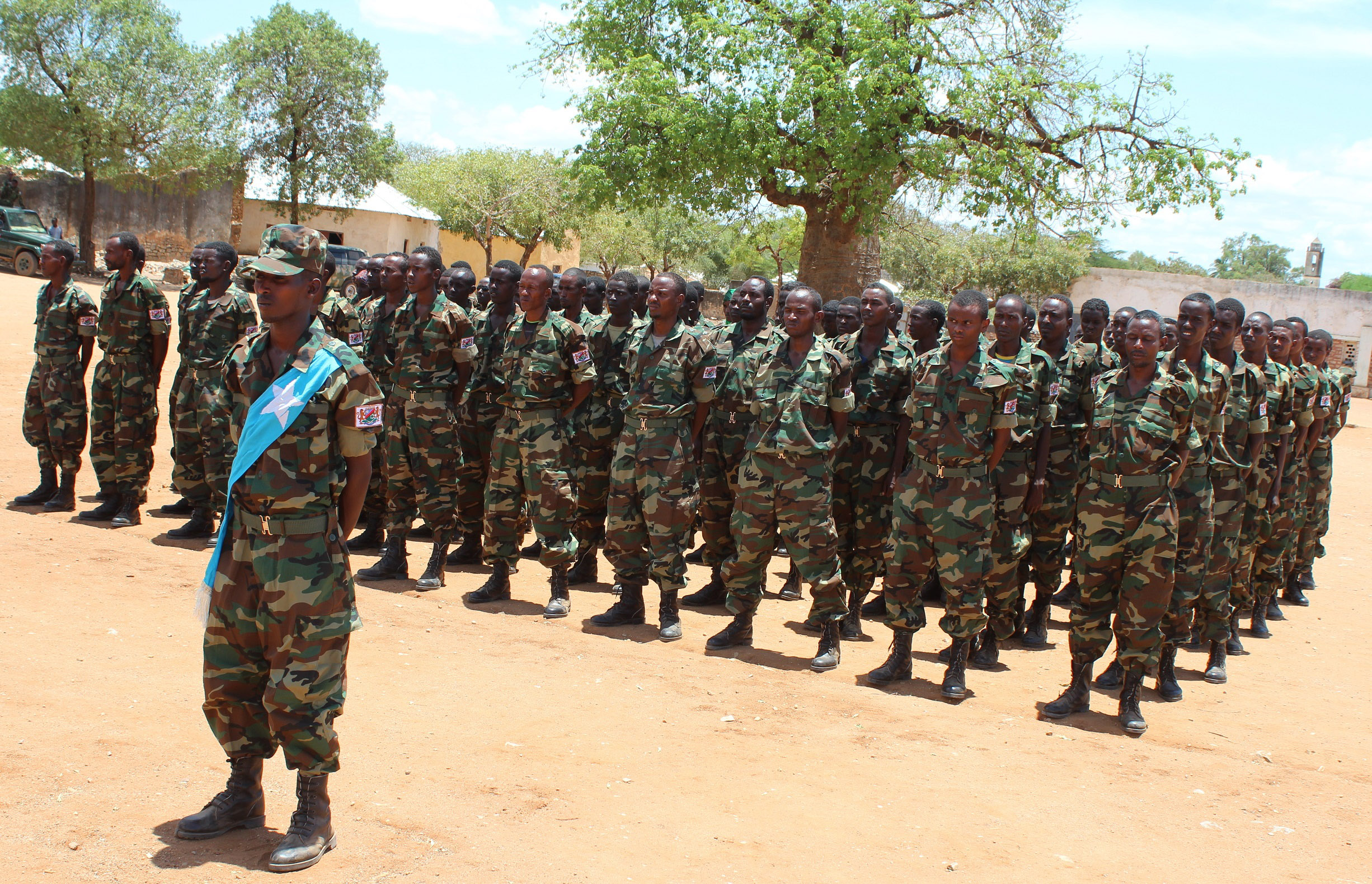
Soldiers of the Somali Armed Forces during their passing out.

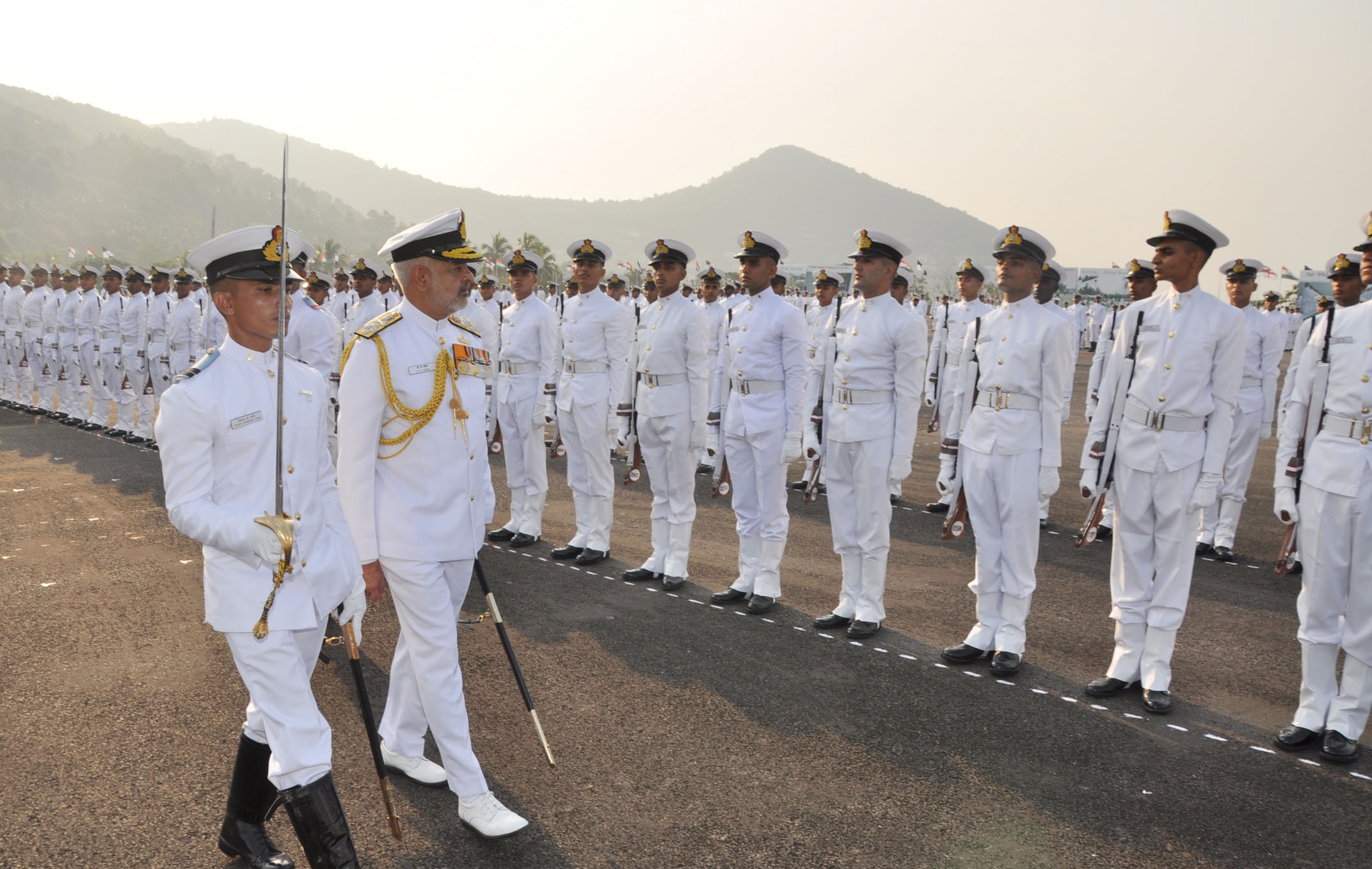
The Chief of Naval Staff reviewing the Guard of Honour during Passing-out parade at Indian Naval Academy.
