= Geeta Menon =

American university professor

- Former Dean of NYU Stern Undergraduate College

Academic background
- Education: University of Illinois (Ph.D. 1991); Madras Christian College (M.A. 1983); Stella Maris College (B.A. 1981)

Academic work
- Discipline: Marketing
- Institutions: NYU Stern School of Business

Geeta Menon is the Abraham Krasnoff Professor of Global Business at New York University Stern School of Business, and is the current chair of the Marketing Department. Most recently, she was the 11th Dean of the NYU Stern Undergraduate College (2011-2019). She has been a member of NYU Stern's Marketing Faculty since 1990, where she also previously served a term as department chair (2004-2008). In January 2015, The Economic Times, India's leading business publication, listed Menon as one of 20 "most influential" global Indian women.

== Education ==
Menon received a B.A. in Economics from Stella Maris College in 1981 and a M.A. in Economics from Madras Christian College (both affiliated with Madras University), and a Ph.D. in Business Administration from the University of Illinois at Urbana-Champaign in 1991.

== Academic career ==
Menon has held appointments at leading business institutions, including the Laura and John J. Pomerantz Professor of Marketing at the Wharton School (2008–2010), Visiting Professor at the Indian School of Business (2009, 2011), and Visiting Scholar at Stanford (Fall 2000) and the Indian Institute of Management Bangalore (Spring 2000).

She teaches marketing courses at the graduate and undergraduate levels and is the recipient of the Citibank Award for excellence in teaching at NYU Stern. Her research interests include consumer memory and information processing, emotions and their influence on consumer judgements, survey methodology and questionnaire design, advertising of health information, and perceptions of risk.

== Research and professional activity ==
Menon has held several professional leadership roles as an active member of the marketing research community. She was the President of the Association for Consumer Research (ACR) in 2010, served on the ACR Board of Directors as Treasurer in 2006, and was co-chair of the 2004 annual ACR conference. In addition, she served as the Associate Editor for two marketing journals, the Journal of Consumer Research (2007–11) and the Journal of Marketing Research (2009–11), besides serving on the editorial boards of journals such as the Journal of Consumer Psychology and the Journal of Public Policy and Marketing. Currently, she is serving her second term on the Journal of Consumer Research Policy Board. As a researcher, Menon is known for her study of consumer memory, information processing and emotions in the contexts of survey methodology, advertising of health information and risk perception. Her work has been funded by the National Institutes of Health and the American Diabetes Association.

During her eight-year tenure as dean of the NYU Stern Undergraduate college, applications went up by 80%, the admit rate went down to single digits for the first time, and yield increased to an all-time high. She founded the now popular Stern Program for Undergraduate Research (SPUR) that over 100 faculty members and 600 students have participated since its inception in 2012.

== See also ==
- Indians in the New York City metropolitan area
