= Commandant of the Indian Military Academy =

- Incumbent; Lieutenant General; Nagendra Singh; AVSM YSM SM since 01 June 2025
- Type: Military
- Status: Active
- Formation: 1932
- First holder: Brigadier Lionel Collins

The Commandant of the Indian Military Academy is a post created in 1932 for the purpose of leading the Indian Military Academy in its education of "gentleman cadets". The Commandant must hold a rank of lieutenant general (three star equivalent) or above. There is no minimum nor maximum term of service in this position though in practice commandants have served anywhere from a few months to 4 years in the position.

== History ==
General Philip Chetwode chose Brigadier L. P. Collins of the 4th Gurkhas as the first commandant. Collins had the task of first acquiring the campus from the railways in Dehradun, and then converting it into an army training institution, taking ten months to do so. On 1 October 1932, the raising day, Collins issued a Special Order of the Day "The Indian Military Academy opens with effect from today [...]."

There were a total of 5 British commandants including Collins, after which Brigadier Thakur Mahadeo Singh was appointed as the first Indian Commandant of IMA in 1947. Thakur Mahadeo Singh was followed by Major General K. S. Thimayya who became the first IMA Commandant to go on to become the Chief of Army Staff in India. Brigadier M. M. Khanna, who was appointed in 1956, was the first alumnus of IMA to be appointed Commandant.

Following a recommendation in 1983 by the Ministry of Defence, the need was felt that cadets needed to know about application of science in weaponry. Lieutenant General Mathew Thomas and all following commandants took note of these changes and implemented them. Thomas also suggested a change in syllabus, proposing new computer focused teaching methods as well as further emphasis on advanced training. This included sending cadets to the High Altitude Warfare School and the Counter Insurgency and Jungle Warfare School, among other things. Commandant Lieutenant General Himmeth Singh appreciated the difficulties of modern warfare, but emphasized the human factor. His outline of teaching is as follows:

"[...] the process of understanding the soldier must remain an on-going process and our skills in handling him suitably modified on requirement. It is by this process only that we shall get the best out of out men and above all not be found wanting by the men we command."

— Lt Gen Himmeth Singh

== Commandants ==
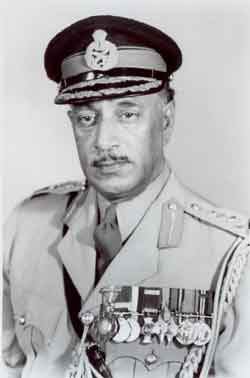
KS Thimayya, Commandant of IMA 1950–1951, went on to become the Chief of Army Staff in India.

Maj Gen K Zorawar Singh (1964 - 1966)

There have been a total of 49 Commandants so far:

#	Start	End	Rank/Name	References
1	1932	1936	Brig Lionel Peter Collins	
2	1936	1939	Brig Harold Kingsley	
3	1939	1942	Brig KD EL Young	
4	1942	1944	Brig JK Jones	
5	1944	1947	Brig Adrian B. Barltrop	
6	1947	1950	Maj Gen Thakur Mahadeo Singh	
7	1950	1951	Maj Gen KS Thimayya	
8	1951	1953	Maj Gen MS Wadalia	
9	1953	1954	Maj Gen Enaith Habibullah	
10	1954	1956	Brig Apji Randhir Singh	
11	1956	1958	Brig MM Khanna	
12	1958	1959	Brig Gobinder Singh	
13	1960	1962	Brig ND Nanavati	
14	1962	1963	Brig PS Bhagat	
15	1963	1964	Maj Gen SC Pandit	
16	1964	1966	Maj Gen K Zorawar Singh	
17	1966	1967	Maj Gen JT Sataravala	
18	1967	1969	Maj Gen D K Palit	
19	1969	1972	Maj Gen Rajindra Prasad	
20	1972	1974	Maj Gen IC Katoch	
21	1974	1975	Maj Gen BR Prabhu	
22	1975	1976	Maj Gen SC Sinha	
23	1976	1979	Maj Gen GS Rawat	
24	1979	1980	Maj Gen Rajendra Nath	
25	1980	1983	Lt Gen M Thomas	
26	1983	1984	Lt Gen Himmeth Singh	
27	1984	1986	Lt Gen BB Sehgal	
28	1986	1986	Lt Gen SS Brar	
29	1986	1988	Lt Gen VP Gupta	
30	1988	1990	Lt Gen NPS Bal	
31	1990	1991	Lt Gen YS Tomar	
32	1991	1991	Lt Gen MA Zaki	
33	1991	1994	Lt Gen JC Pant	
34	1994	1996	Lt Gen Inder Verma	
35	1996	1998	Lt Gen AS Sandhu	
36	1998	1999	Lt Gen MA Gurbaxani Sahi	
37	1999	2001	Lt Gen Yuvraj Mehta	
38	2001	2003	Lt Gen TS Shergill	
39	2003	2004	Lt Gen GS Negi	
40	2004	2006	Lt Gen KK Khanna	
41	2006	2008	Lt Gen PK Rampal	
42	2008	2011	Lt Gen R. Singh Sujlana	
43	2011	2015	Lt Gen Manvender Singh	
44	2015	2015	Lt Gen Balwant Singh Negi	
45	2016	2016	Lt Gen Satinder Kumar Saini	
46	2016	2017	Lt Gen Santosh Kumar Upadhya	
47	2018	2018	Lt Gen Satinder Kumar Saini	
48	2018	2020	Lt Gen Sanjay Kumar Jha	
49	August 2020	Sept 2020	Lt Gen Jaiveer Singh Negi	
50	October 2020	August 2022	Lt Gen Harinder Singh	
51	September 2022	January 2024	Lt Gen Vijay Kumar Mishra	
52	February 2024	May 2025	Lt Gen Sandeep Jain	
53	June 2025	Till date	Lt Gen Nagendra Singh	

== See also ==
- Commandant of the National Defence College
- Commandant of the National Defence Academy
- Commandant of Indian Naval Academy
- Commandant of the Air Force Academy

== Bibliography ==
- Singh, Brigadier M. P. (2007). History of the Indian Military Academy. Ludhiana: Unistar Books. ISBN 9788189899561.
