= Thakur Mahadeo Singh =

Indian Army general

Major General Thakur Mahadeo Singh DSO
- Born: 9 November 1907; Mainpuri district, United Provinces of Agra and Oudh, British India (now Uttar Pradesh, India)
- Died: 8 July 1963 (aged 55)
- Military career
- Allegiance: British India (1928–1947); India (1947–1960)
- Branch: British Indian Army; Indian Army
- Service years: 1928–1960
- Rank: Major General
- Service number: IA-561
- Units: 1st Punjab Regiment; 2nd Punjab Regiment; Punjab Regiment
- Commands: Joint Services Wing; Indian Military Academy
- Conflicts: Third Waziristan Campaign; World War II; North African campaign; Italian Campaign; Gothic Line; Operation Grapeshot
- Awards: Distinguished Service Order

Major General Thakur Mahadeo Singh, DSO (9 November 1907 – 8 July 1963) was an Indian military officer who was the first Indian commandant of the Indian Military Academy and the first commandant of the Joint Services Wing, the precursor to the National Defence Academy.

== Early life ==
Singh was born to a Chauhan Rajput family with a long tradition of military service. His grandfather Darshan Singh had joined the 70th Bengal Native Infantry (which later became the 11th Rajputs) in 1859, retiring in 1893 as an honorary captain. His father Jugraj Singh served as a subedar-major with the same regiment in France during World War I.

== Early career ==
Singh joined the Prince of Wales' Royal Indian Military College (today the Rashtriya Indian Military College) in February 1922 and passed out with its first batch of cadets and was selected to become a King's Commissioned Indian Officer (KCIO). He then attended the Royal Military Academy Sandhurst and was commissioned a second lieutenant in the British Indian Army on 30 August 1928. As was customary, he was attached to a battalion of a regular British Army regiment, the 2nd battalion of the Royal Scots Fusiliers, for a period of one year prior to his official appointment to the Indian Army. He was formally appointed to the Indian Army as an officer with the 1st Punjab Regiment on 17 October 1929. Initially, he was posted to the 2nd battalion of the 1st Punjab Regiment, stationed at Hangu, now in Pakistan and then in the North-West Frontier Province. Among the other junior officers in the same battalion were Lieutenants Kalwant Singh and Pran Nath Thapar, both of whom would also become generals in the Indian Army. The battalion was posted to Kamptee in December 1930, shortly after Singh's promotion to lieutenant.

On 1 October 1932, he transferred to 5/2 Punjab Regiment, stationed at Bannu. In October 1934, 5/2 Punjab was posted to Chittagong, and Singh was appointed a company quartermaster on 16 December. In November 1936, he was posted with his battalion to Secunderabad. On 27 October 1938, Singh transferred to 10/2 Punjab, and served in the Waziristan campaign.

== Second World War ==
Deployed in Iraq following the outbreak of war, Singh subsequently fought in the North African campaign and was then selected to attend the Army Staff College at Quetta, where he remained as an instructor after passing the course, with a promotion to local lieutenant-colonel on 14 December 1942. In August 1944, he rejoined 1/2 Punjab, by then in Italy as a unit of the 10th Indian Infantry Brigade, as its second-in-command. On 22 November 1944, he was appointed the battalion's first Indian commanding officer, becoming one of the first Indian COs in the European theatre. For his leadership during the subsequent Gothic Line and spring offensives, he was decorated with the Distinguished Service Order (DSO); the award was gazetted on 13 December 1945. The award citation (which was not published) reads as follows:

CITATION

LIEUTENANT COLONEL MAHADEO SINGH

1/2 PUNJAB

This officer has commanded his Battalion with skill and distinction during the campaign this year. At Albereto, and again at Pideura in December last he led his Battalion successfully in hard fought actions. This final battle was the attack by his Battalion on the strongly defended Idice river near Mezzolara. Here, following a fast pursuit, the enemy chose to stand. Fighting was hard and casualties heavy but the Battalion, ably directed and controlled by Lt Col Mahadeo Singh, was able to take and hold the river crossing.

Throughout this action Lt Col Mahadeo Singh displayed gallantry of a very high order.

== Post-war career ==
Singh took over as the Colonel of the Regiment of the Punjab Regiment on 21 March 1950. He served as the Colonel of the regiment for over 11 years, the longest tenure till date.

He first served as Deputy Commandant of the Indian Military Academy, and then in 1947, after Independence, took over as the first Indian commandant of the academy, taking over from Brig AB Baltrop, MC.

== Awards and decorations ==
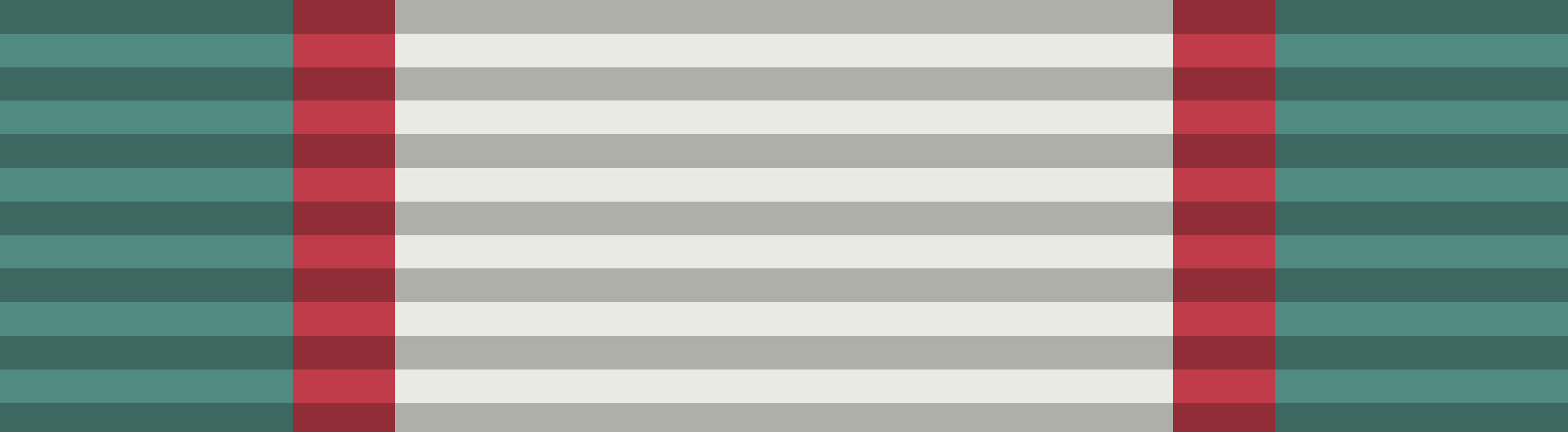

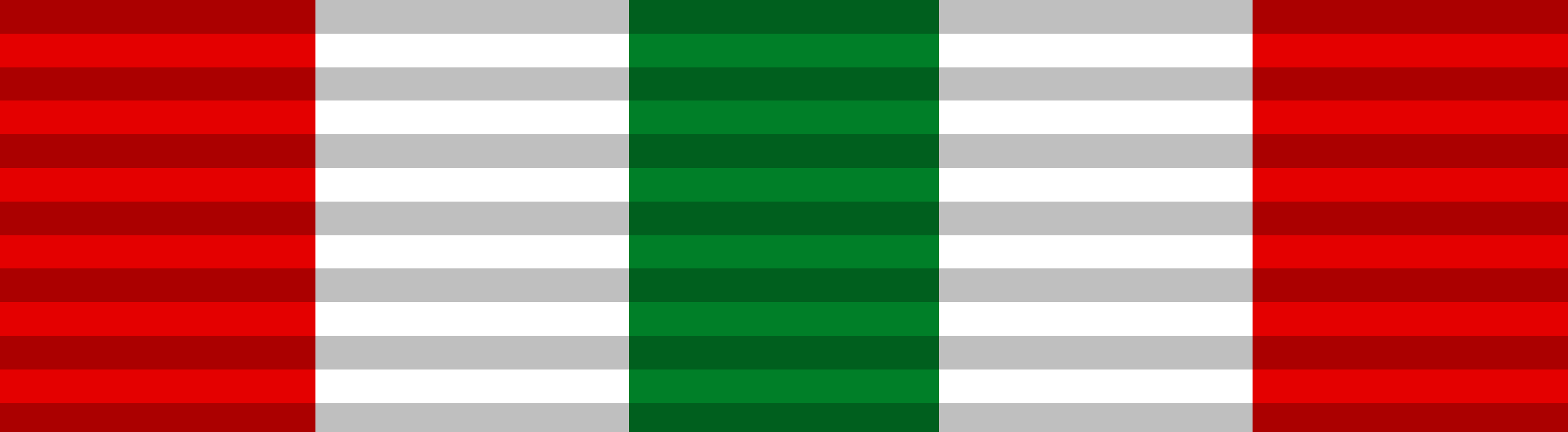

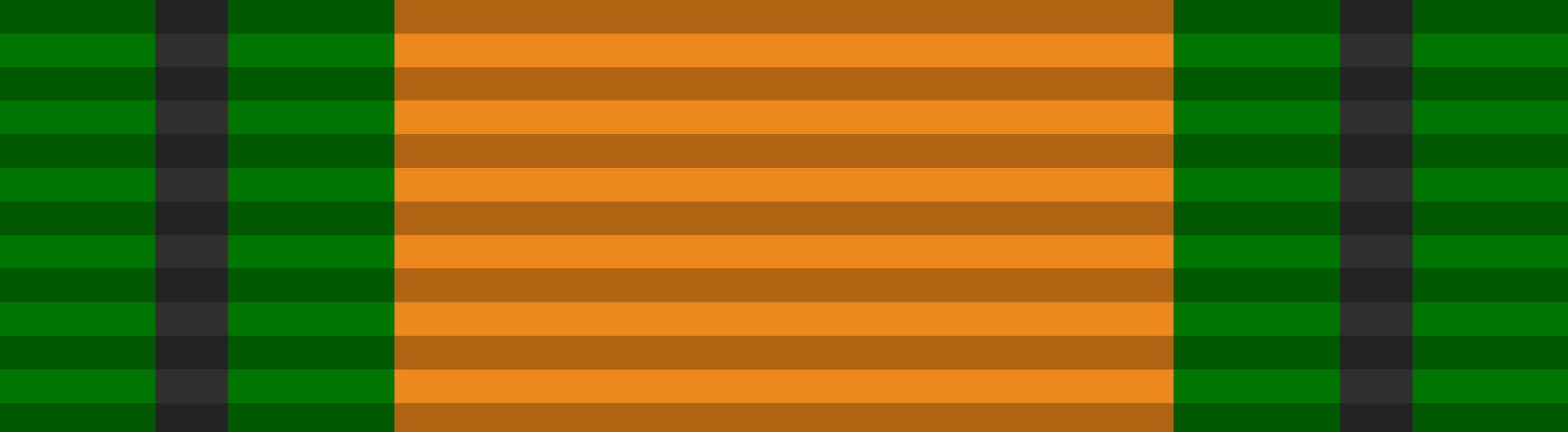

Indian Independence Medal		Distinguished Service Order	General Service Medal (1918)	India General Service Medal (1936)
1939–1945 Star	Africa Star	Italy Star	Defence Medal	War Medal 1939–1945

== Dates of rank ==
Insignia	Rank	Component	Date of rank
	Second Lieutenant	British Indian Army	30 August 1928
	Lieutenant	British Indian Army	30 November 1930
	Captain	British Indian Army	30 August 1937
	Major	British Indian Army	20 June 1941 (acting); 11 May 1942 (temporary); 22 November 1944 (war-substantive); 30 August 1945 (substantive)
	Lieutenant-Colonel	British Indian Army	14 December 1942 (local); 22 November 1944 (acting)
	Major	Indian Army	15 August 1947 (Note: Upon independence in 1947, India became a Dominion within the British Commonwealth of Nations. As a result, the rank insignia of the British Army, incorporating the Tudor Crown and four-pointed Bath Star ("pip"), was retained, as George VI remained Commander-in-Chief of the Indian Armed Forces. After 26 January 1950, when India became a republic, the President of India became Commander-in-Chief, and the Ashoka Lion replaced the crown, with a five-pointed star being substituted for the "pip.")
	Lieutenant-Colonel	Indian Army	
	Brigadier	Indian Army	
	Brigadier	Indian Army	26 January 1950 (recommissioning and change in insignia)
	Major General	Indian Army	

== Notes ==
Military offices
Preceded by Adrian Barltrop	Commandant of the Indian Military Academy; 1947-1950	Succeeded by Kodandera Subayya Thimayya
New title First holder	Commandant of the Joint Services Wing; 1949-1950	Succeeded by Kodandera Subayya Thimayya
