= Commandant of the National Defence Academy =

Head of the Indian National Defence Academy

- Incumbent; Vice Admiral Anil Jaggi since 5 November 2025
- Type: Military
- Status: Active
- Residence: Commandant's Residence, National Defence Academy
- Seat: National Defence Academy
- Formation: 1 January 1949
- First holder: Major General Thakur Mahadeo Singh, DSO
- Deputy: Air Vice Marshal S Bedi, VM, VSM
- Website: www.nda.nic.in

The Commandant of the National Defence Academy is the head and overall in-charge of the National Defence Academy. The Commandant of the Academy is a Three-star rank officer from the three Services in rotation. The current Commandant is Vice Admiral Anil Jaggi who took over from Vice Admiral Gurcharan Singh on 5 November 2025. He is supported by the Deputy Commandant (a Two-star rank appointment), Brigadier Administration (Brig Adm), Principal Director (Training) (both One-Star appointments), a Civilian Principal and the Adjutant (An Officer of the rank of Lieutenant Colonel).

Commissioned as Joint Services Wing (JSW), the interim training academy was set up at the Indian Military Academy (IMA). The first Commandant of JSW was Major General Thakur Mahadeo Singh, DSO. The present-day National Defence Academy was constructed in Pune and was formally commissioned on 7 December 1954 as the successor to JSW of IMA. The program of JSW was transferred from IMA to NDA. Major General Enaith Habibullah was the last head of the JSW and the First Commandant of NDA at Pune.

== Joint Services Wing at Indian Military Academy ==
S.No.	Name	Branch	Assumed office	Left office	Notes
1	Major General Thakur Mahadeo Singh DSO	Indian Army	1 January 1949	12 March 1950	First head of JSW at IMA.
2	Major General K. S. Thimayya DSO	Indian Army	13 March 1950	17 June 1951	Later served as the Chief of Army Staff of Indian Army.
3	Major General Mohinder Singh Wadalia	Indian Army	16 Jun 1951	6 January 1953	
4	Major General Enaith Habibullah	Indian Army	7 January 1953	6 December 1954	Last head of JSW at IMA

== National Defence Academy ==
S.No.	Name	Branch	Assumed office	Left office	Notes
1	Major General Enaith Habibullah	Indian Army	7 December 1954	26 December 1958	First Commandant at NDA, Khadakwasla.
2	Rear Admiral Benjamin Abraham Samson	Indian Navy	27 December 1958	1 January 1963	First non-army and also the first Naval Officer to be the Commandant. Later Flag Officer Commanding Indian Fleet (FOCIF).
3	Air Vice Marshal K. L. Sondhi	Indian Air Force	6 January 1963	25 September 1963	First Air Force Officer to be the Commandant.
4	Major General R. Bakhshi MC	Indian Army	26 September 1963	8 August 1966	
5	Air Vice Marshal S. N. Goyal	Indian Air Force	9 August 1966	18 June 1968	
6	Rear Admiral R. N. Batra	Indian Navy	19 June 1968	05 October 1970	
7	Major General S. D. Gupta	Indian Army	16 October 1970	1 January 1973	
8	Air Vice Marshal M. B. Naik	Indian Air Force	3 January 1973	7 March 1976	
9	Rear Admiral M P Awati VrC	Indian Navy	8 March 1976	22 July 1977	Later Flag Officer Commanding-in-Chief Western Naval Command.
10	Major General R. K. Jasbir Singh	Indian Army	22 July 1977	21 May 1979	
11	Air Marshal M. J. Dotiwalla	Indian Air Force	9 July 1979	30 June 1982	First three-star air force officer to be the commandant.
12	Rear Admiral R. P. Sawhney	Indian Navy	1 July 1982	15 August 1985	First Ex-NDA commandant. Alumnus of the first NDA (JSW) Course.
13	Lieutenant General Sami Khan PVSM SM	Indian Army	16 August 1985	2 November 1986	First three-star army officer (Lieutenant General) to be the commandant. Later General Officer Commanding-in-Chief Central Command.
14	Lieutenant General K. L. K. Singh	Indian Army	12 December 1986	28 June 1988	
15	Air Marshal D. S. Sabhikhi AVSM	Indian Air Force	29 June 1988	31 August 1991	
16	Vice Admiral Inderjit Bedi AVSM	Indian Navy	1 September 1991	11 October 1993	First three-star naval officer (Vice Admiral) to be the commandant. Later Flag Officer Commanding-in-Chief Southern Naval Command.
17	Lieutenant General S. K. Jetley AVSM SM	Indian Army	12 October 1993	24 March 1995	
18	Air Marshal A. S. Sethi	Indian Air Force	25 March 1995	31 January 1996	
19	Air Marshal J. S. Rai VM & bar	Indian Air Force	1 February 1996	9 June 1997	
20	Vice Admiral Arun Prakash AVSM VrC VSM	Indian Navy	19 March 1999	Later Chief of the Naval Staff.	
21	Lieutenant General S. B. S. Kochar PVSM AVSM	Indian Army	12 April 1999	31 March 2001	
22	Air Marshal A. K. Trikha AVSM VSM	Indian Air Force	1 April 2001	31 December 2002	
23	Vice Admiral S. C. S. Bangara PVSM AVSM	Indian Navy	01 January 2003	24 July 2004	
24	Lieutenant General A K Chopra PVSM AVSM	Indian Army	4 August 2004	30 November 2006	
25	Air Marshal T S Randhawa VM	Indian Air Force	1 December 2006	31 December 2008	
26	Vice Admiral R K Dhowan AVSM YSM	Indian Navy	1 January 2009	29 November 2009	Later served as the Chief of Naval Staff of the Indian Navy.
27	Vice Admiral Satish Soni AVSM NM	Indian Navy	29 November 2009	1 January 2011	Later FOC-in-C of Southern and Eastern Commands of Indian Navy.
28	Lieutenant General Jatinder Singh AVSM & bar SM	Indian Army	1 January 2011	5 July 2012	Removed from the position. Accused of being involved in recruitment scandal.
29	Lieutenant General Ashok Singh AVSM SM VSM	Indian Army	7 August 2012	31 December 2012	Later served as the General Officer Commanding-in-Chief Southern Command.
30	Air Marshal K S Gill AVSM YSM VM	Indian Air Force	1 January 2013	31 July 2014	Later served as the Air Officer Commanding-in-Chief Central Air Command.
31	Air Marshal R K S Bhadauria AVSM VM	Indian Air Force	1 August 2014	31 January 2015	Later served as Chief of the Air Staff
32	Vice Admiral G Ashok Kumar AVSM VSM	Indian Navy	1 April 2015	2 June 2016	Later served as the Vice Chief of the Naval Staff
33	Air Marshal Jasjit Singh Kler AVSM VM	Indian Air Force	20 June 2016	31 March 2018	
34	Air Marshal Vipin Indira Panabhan Nayar VM	Indian Air Force	7 April 2018	14 December 2019	Later Commandant of the Air Force Academy.
35	Lieutenant General Asit Mistry AVSM SM VSM	Indian Army	1 February 2020	31 October 2021	
36	Air Marshal Sanjeev Kapoor AVSM VSM	Indian Air Force	01 November 2021	31 March 2022	Later Commandant of the Air Force Academy.
37	Vice Admiral Ajay Kochhar AVSM NM	Indian Navy	1 April 2022	24 May 2024	Current Vice Chief of the Naval Staff.
38	Vice Admiral Gurcharan Singh AVSM NM	Indian Navy	25 May 2024	31 October 2025	Current Chief of Personnel.
39	Vice Admiral Anil Jaggi	Indian Navy	5 Nov 2025	Present	

== List of Commandants by branches of service ==
Branch	Count
Indian Army	15
Indian Navy	13
Indian Air Force	14

== See also ==
- Commandant of the Indian Military Academy
- Commandant of the National Defence College
- Commandant of Indian Naval Academy
