= Rajendra Nath (soldier) =

Retired Indian Army officer

Major General Rajendra Nath PVSM (born 1925) is a retired Indian Army officer.

== Military career ==
Nath graduated from the Indian Military Academy and was the commissioned into the 11th Gorkha Rifles in 1947. In 1952, he served in the Military Intelligence Directorate in New Delhi. He volunteered to lead a reconnaissance team into Aksai Chin. The team was selected by Nath and included a military engineer, doctor and fifteen men. Interpreters and linguists were attached. They also carried with them gifts for distribution such as sweets, kerosene oil, sugar and medicines. Animals such as ponies were taken to carry supplies. The reconnaissance team started on 5 October and according to media reports trekked across Chang La, Marsmik La, Chang Chenmo River valley ending the mission at Lanak La. They returned on 15 November. The findings of the reconnaissance remain a secret till date.

During the 1971 war, Nath was in charge of the 62 Mountain Brigade. Men under Major General Mohammad Hussain Ansari of 9 Pakistan Division surrendered to the Nath.

From 1959 to 1961 he got the opportunity to attend a course at the Canadian Army Staff College. He taught at Defence Services Staff College in Wellington Cantonment, from 1965 to 1968. He was also commander of an infantry division in Jammu and Kashmir. He later served as Commandant of the Indian Military Academy in 1979–80.

He retired in 1982.

== Later career ==
Nath has been associated with the Institute for the Blind in Chandigarh since 1982. He has been awarded for his social work, including a Haryana Ratan in 2005.

Since the days of Mahabharata, we've been fighting more among ourselves than against outsiders. That needs to change.

— Major General Rajendra Nath

== Publications ==
Books

- 1990: Military Leadership in India: Vedic Period to Indo-Pak Wars. Lancer Books. ISBN 9788170950189
- 2009: Flash Points in South Asia. (With Kuldip Ludra). ISBN 9788170951179
- 2016: Strategic Ladakh: A Historical Narrative 1951-53 and a Military Perspective. Vij Books. ISBN 9789385563492

Essays

- Gulf War and Security of South Asia (January - March 1989) USI Journal.
- Indian XI Corps and Battle of Asal Uttar 1965. Indian Military History.
