= Shalini Bharat =

Indian academic

Shalini Bharat is Director of Tata Institute of Social Sciences (TISS), Mumbai.

== Academic contribution ==
Bharat has worked extensively in the field of HIV/AIDS and wrote several articles in identifying stigmas, gaps and recommendation highlighting the current scenario of Health Systems in India.
