= Divya (rural locality) =

Rural locality in Dobryansky District, Perm Krai, Russia

Coordinates: 58°17′N 56°36′E

Divya (Russian: Дивья) is a settlement in administrative jurisdiction of the town of Dobryanka in Perm Krai, Russia, located 40 kilometers (25 mi) north-east of Perm. Population: 1,801 (1989 Soviet census); 3,600 (1962).

It was established in 1950 as a settlement serving the construction of a railway station. It was granted urban-type settlement status on September 8, 1961. In 1997, it was demoted in status back to that of a rural locality.
