= Harinder Singh (general) =

General Officer in the Indian Army

Lieutenant General Harinder Singh PVSM, AVSM, YSM, SM, VSM
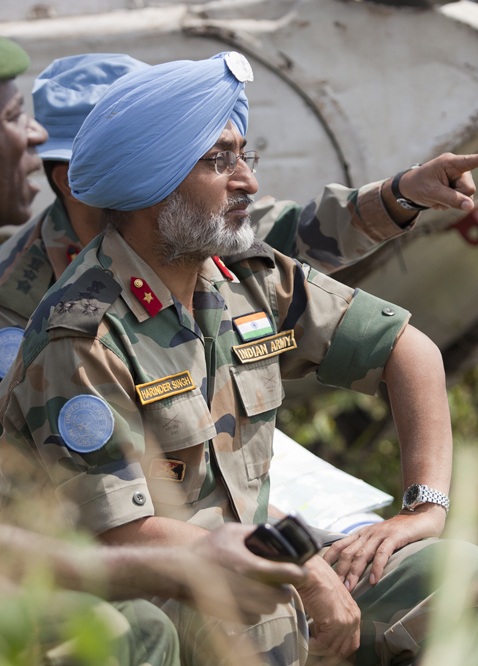
- Gen. Harinder Singh as North Kivu brigade commander in 2012
- Military career
- Allegiance: India
- Branch: Indian Army
- Service years: 17 December 1983 – 31 August 2022
- Rank: Lieutenant General
- Service number: IC-41528
- Unit: Maratha Light Infantry
- Commands: Commandant Indian Military Academy; XIV Corps; Rashtriya Rifles
- Awards: Param Vishisht Seva Medal; Ati Vishisht Seva Medal; Vishisht Seva Medal; Yudh Seva Medal; Sena Medal

Lieutenant General Harinder Singh PVSM, AVSM, YSM, SM, VSM, is a retired General Officer of the Indian Army. He retired from Indian Army after serving as commandant of Indian Military Academy in his last appointment. Previously, he was the Commander of XIV Corps (also known as Fire and Fury Corps) from October 2019 to October 2020, succeeding Lt Gen Yogesh Kumar Joshi, PVSM, UYSM, AVSM, VrC, SM, ADC.

== Early life and education ==
General Harinder Singh completed his schooling from Senior Secondary School Sector 10, Bhilai. An alumnus of NDA and IMA, the officer has been an academy blue in hockey and represented his school and services at the national level.

== Career ==
The officer was commissioned into the Maratha Light Infantry Regiment, in Dec 1983.

== Honours and decorations ==
, Ati Vishisht Seva Medal (AVSM) in 2017, Yudh Seva Medal (YSM) in 2005, Sena Medal (SM-G) for gallantry in 1984 and Vishist Seva Medal (VSM) in 2016.

Param Vishisht Seva Medal		Ati Vishisht Seva Medal	
Yudh Seva Medal	Sena Medal	Vishisht Seva Medal	Special Service Medal
Siachen Glacier Medal	Operation Vijay Medal	Operation Parakram Medal	Sainya Seva Medal
High Altitude Service Medal	Videsh Seva Medal	50th Anniversary of Independence Medal	30 Years Long Service Medal
20 Years Long Service Medal	9 Years Long Service Medal	UNAVEM III Medal	United Nations Medal

== Dates of rank ==
Insignia	Rank	Component	Date of rank
	Second Lieutenant	Indian Army	17 December 1983
	Lieutenant	Indian Army	17 December 1985
	Captain	Indian Army	17 December 1988
	Major	Indian Army	17 December 1994
	Lieutenant-Colonel	Indian Army	16 December 2004
	Colonel	Indian Army	15 March 2006
	Brigadier	Indian Army	1 April 2011 (substantive, with seniority from 5 September 2009)
	Major General	Indian Army	1 June 2016 (substantive, with seniority from 13 January 2013)
	Lieutenant-General	Indian Army	1 October 2018

== See also ==
- List of serving generals of the Indian Army

Military offices
Preceded by Yogesh Kumar Joshi	General Officer Commanding XIV Corps; October 2019 - Incumbent	Succeeded by PGK Menon
