= Divya Prabha Eye Hospital =

Eye care hospital in Kerala, India

- Company type: Partnership
- Industry: Health care
- Founded: Trivandrum, Kerala State, India (1998)
- Founder: Dr. Suseela Prabhakaran
- Headquarters: Thiruvananthapuram, Varkala, India
- Key people: Dr. Suseela Prabhakaran, Dr. Devin Prabhakar

Divya Prabha Eye Hospital (established in 1998) is in Trivandrum, capital of Kerala, India.

Dr. Suseela Prabhakaran, the founder Director of the Regional Institute of Ophthalmology, Thiruvananthapuram, Kerala State, India, founded the hospital. Initially started as a small eye clinic, Divya Prabha has now grown to a full-fledged eye hospital with a modern operation theatre complex and inpatient facility.

== Community program ==
The hospital is sponsoring cataract surgery at subsidised rates for people from low financial background. Under the Dr. N. Prabhakaran Memorial Eye Camp Scheme the hospital will be sponsoring two cataract surgeries per week at a subsidised rate. The hospital does not discriminate patients depending upon the financial status and aims at providing a single standard of eye care.

== Affiliations ==
The hospital is recognised by Ministry of Defence, Ministry of Space and Technology Government of India to provide cashless treatment for their employees.

The hospital is also in the panel of

- ECHS scheme of Ministry of Defence, Government of India
- CGHS for central government employees
- CHS for VSSC employees, Ministry of Space and Technology, Government of India
- RSBY scheme of Government of Kerala
- Ayushman Bharat scheme of Government of India
- TTK healthcare services
- Mediassist
- FHPL
- Star Health Insurance

== Certifications ==
The hospital is certified by:

- NABH entry level
- ISO 9001:2015
- Kayakalp

== Awards ==
The hospital has won the following awards:

- Best Doctor Award 2013 to Dr. Devin Prabhakar MS, FRCS by Government of Kerala
- IMA Lifetime achievement award to Dr. Suseela Prabhakaran.

== Management ==
- Dr. Suseela Prabhakaran, Managing Director
- Dr. Devin Prabhakar MS, FRCS Director
- Dr. Kavitha Anilkumar Resident Medical Officer

== Newspaper articles ==
- "Lending light... after death". The Hindu. 6 March 2006. Archived from the original on 9 March 2007.
- "Urbanisation and health". The Hindu. 7 April 2010. Archived from the original on 12 April 2010.
