= Shalini Divya =

Innovator and scientist in New Zealand

Academic background
- Education: Victoria University of Wellington, Birla Institute of Technology, Mesra
- Doctoral advisor: Thomas Nann, Jim Johnston

Shalini Divya is an Indian chemist and entrepreneur working in New Zealand, specialising in developing aluminium-ion battery technology as a commercial alternative to lithium-ion batteries. She is the co-founder of battery technology company TasmanIon. Divya was awarded a KiwiNet Breakthrough Innovator award in 2021.

== Career ==
Divya was born and raised in India, and gained a Bachelor of Science in chemistry from Delhi University and a master's degree in chemistry at the Birla Institute of Technology in Mesra, India. She moved to New Zealand to undertake doctoral research, completing a PhD at the MacDiarmid Institute for Advanced Materials and Nanotechnology at Victoria University of Wellington in 2021, under the supervision of Thomas Nann (University of Newcastle, Australia) and Jim Johnston. Divya worked on selecting a suitable cathode element for non-aqueous aluminium-ion batteries. Divya co-founded company TasmanIon, of which she is also chief executive, with Thomas Nann in 2022. The company aims to commercialise the aluminium-ion battery technology developed by Divya. The batteries are intended to be more sustainable than lithium batteries as the components are more abundant, and are also easier to recycle. Aluminium ion batteries also do not need cobalt, avoiding the ethical problems of cobalt mining, and are safer as there is no risk of explosion.

In 2021 Divya was awarded a KiwiNet Breakthrough Innovator award. TasmanIon was shortlisted for the inaugural Le Zero Innovation Award. TasmanIon was also selected as one of three participants in Wellington City Council-supported Creative HQ Climate Response Accelerator programme.

== Selected works ==
- Shalini Divya; Nann, Thomas (2020). "High Voltage Carbon‐Based Cathodes for Non‐Aqueous Aluminium‐Ion Batteries**". ChemElectroChem. 8 (3): 492–499. doi:10.1002/celc.202001490. Wikidata Q131552212.
- Shalini Divya; James H. Johnston; Nann, Thomas (2020). "Molybdenum Dichalcogenide Cathodes for Aluminum‐Ion Batteries". Energy Technology (journal). 8 (6). doi:10.1002/ente.202070061. Wikidata Q131552214.
