= Divya Ajith Kumar =

Army Air Defense officer in Indian Army

- Born: Chennai, India
- Education: Stella Maris College, Chennai (B.Com.)
- Military career
- Allegiance: India
- Branch: Corps of Army Air Defence
- Awards: Sword of Honour

Divya Ajith Kumar is an Army Air Defense (AAD) officer in the Indian Army. She graduated from the Officers Training Academy, Chennai. Kumar is the first woman to be conferred by the Army with the Sword of Honour, a prize given to the best cadet. She led an all-woman contingent of 154 female officers and cadets during the Republic Day Parade in 2015.

== Early life and education ==
Divya Ajith Kumar was born in Chennai to a Tamil family. She is a first-generation soldier. She attended Good Shepherd Matriculation Higher Secondary School, and Stella Maris College, Chennai, where she completed her B.Com. (Hons). She joined the National Cadet Corps (NCC) and participated in the NCC women contingent in Rajpath. Kumar later joined, and graduated from the Officers Training Academy (OTA). Kumar was awarded the Sword of Honour prize, given to the best cadet. She was the first woman to be awarded the prize.

== Military career ==
Kumar was commissioned into Corps of Army Air Defence in September 2010. She also jointly topped the Young Officers' course of the Army Air Defence College in 2011 and was awarded the Silver Gun Trophy. Kumar led the first all-women contingent of the Army on Republic Day in 2015. She led a contingent of 126 officers and 28 cadets during the parade, where US President Barack Obama was present as the chief guest. She currently teaches at the Officers Training Academy in Chennai.
