= Eastern Command (India) =

Indian army command

- Formation Sign of the Eastern Command
- Active: 1920–present
- Country: India
- Branch: Indian Army
- Type: Command
- Headquarters: Vijay Durg, Kolkata, West Bengal
- Engagements: World War II; Sino-Indian War; Indo-Pakistani War of 1971; 2020 China–India skirmishes

Commanders
- Current commander: Lt Gen V. M. Bhuvana Krishnan, PVSM AVSM YSM
- Notable commanders: Field Marshal Kodandera Madappa Cariappa; Gen Rajendrasinhji Jadeja; Gen K S Thimayya; Gen P. P. Kumaramangalan; Field Marshal Sam Manekshaw; Lt Gen S. P. P. Thorat; Gen A. S. Vaidya; Gen V. N. Sharma; Gen V. K. Singh; Gen Bikram Singh; Gen Dalbir Singh Suhag; Gen M. M. Naravane; Gen Anil Chauhan; Gen Manoj Pande

Insignia
- Flag

The Eastern Command is one of the six operational commands of the Indian Army. It is headquartered in Vijay Durg (formerly known as Fort William) in the city of Kolkata in the state of West Bengal. The Eastern Command was formed on 1 November 1920. The Command is commanded by a three-star rank officer with the title General Officer Commanding-in-Chief (GOC-in-C).

Lieutenant General V. M. Bhuvana Krishnan is the present Eastern Army Commander since 1 April 2026.

== History ==
=== Early history ===
The Presidency armies were abolished with effect from 1 April 1895 when the three Presidency armies of Bengal, Bombay, and Madras became the Indian Army. The Indian Army was divided into four Commands: Bengal Command, Bombay Command, Madras Command and Punjab Command, each under a lieutenant general.

Between 1904 and 1908, the Bengal Command became the Eastern Command. In 1908, the four commands were merged into two Armies – the Northern Army and Southern Army – as recommended by the then Commander-in-Chief, Indian Army, Lord Kitchener. This system persisted until 1920 when the arrangement reverted to four commands again: Eastern Command, Northern Command, Southern Command and Western Command.

On 1 November 1920, the Eastern Command was formed, with its summer headquarters in Nainital and winter headquarters in Lucknow. General Sir Havelock Hudson, became its first Commander.

=== Second World War ===
In 1942, the command had the following formations under it:

- IV Corps (Headquarters at Imphal)
  - 17th Indian Infantry Division and 23rd Indian Infantry Division
- XXXIII Corps (Headquarters at Arakan)
  - 14th Indian Infantry Division and 26th Indian Infantry Division
- 70th British Division and 50th Indian Tank Brigade in reserve.

On 21 April 1942, the command was re-designated as Eastern Army. Its headquarters moved to Barrackpore to fight the World War II. The Chindits were raised and launched into operations in 1943, by the 77th Indian Infantry Brigade, a unit of the Eastern Command.

In October 1943, the Fourteenth Army was formed and was given responsibility for the area east of the Meghna River. With this, the Eastern Army retained responsibility for the area west of the river.

After the war, on 23 March 1947, the Command HQ moved to Ranchi. The HQ was later moved to Lucknow in 1955. However, on 1 May 1963, post the Sino-Indian War; the Central Command was re-raised and Lucknow was made its HQ, while Kolkata was made HQ Eastern Command.

=== Indo-Pakistani War of 1971 ===
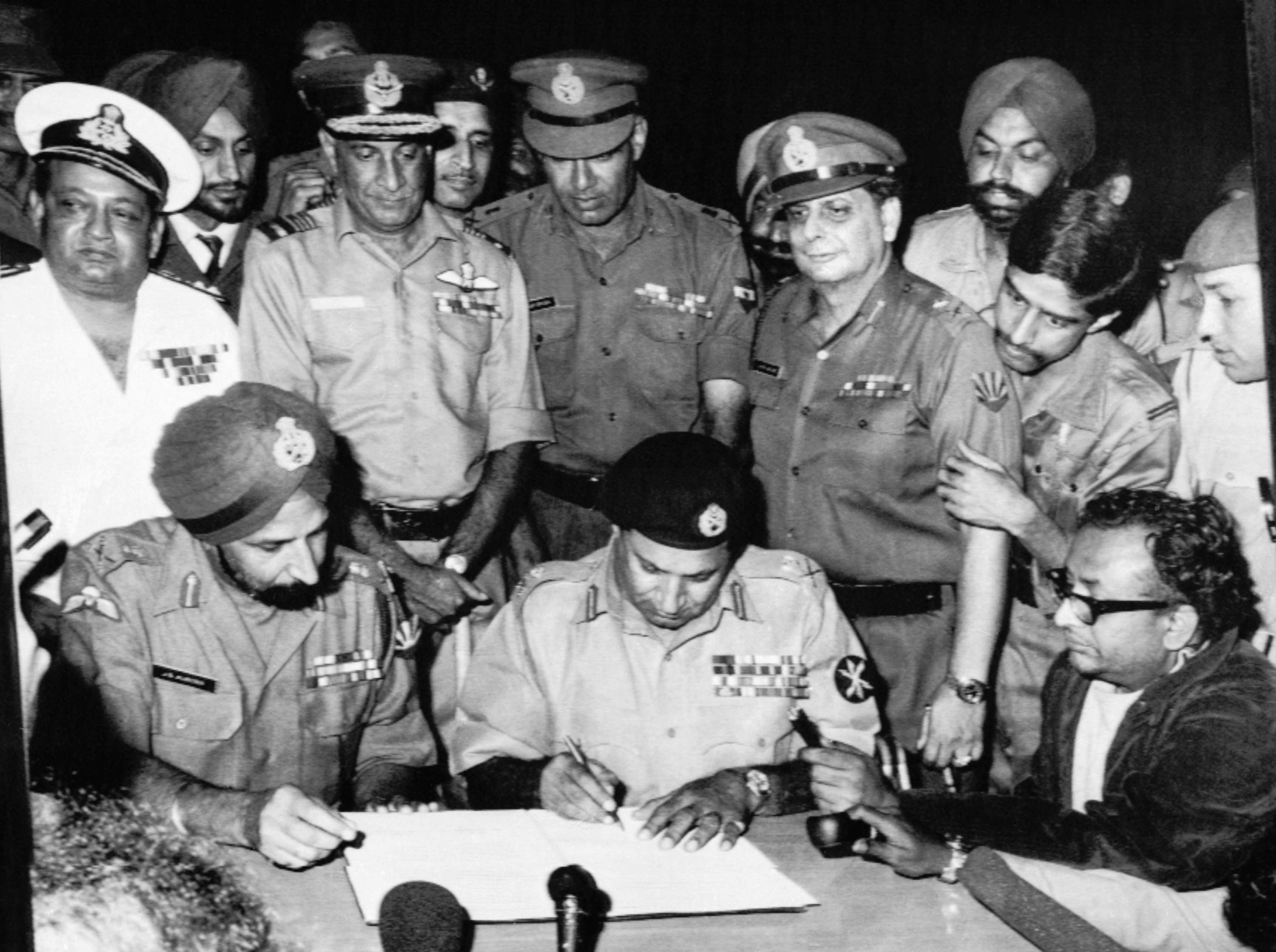
Pakistan's Lt. Gen. A. A. K. Niazi signing the Instrument of Surrender under the gaze of Lt. Gen. J. S. Aurora, the head of the Indian Army's Eastern Command, on 16 December 1971, in Dhaka.

The Command had the overall responsibility of the eastern theatre of the 13-day war. The command had the two existing infantry corps – IV Corps and XXXIII Corps, and raised another – II Corps. Apart from this, the 101 Communication Zone was reorganised as a Division-sized combat formation. Lieutenant General J S Arora, as the General Officer Commanding-in-Chief Eastern Command, commanded all Indian and Bangladesh Forces in the eastern theatre. The Order of Battle of the Eastern Command during the war was:

II Corps (HQ - Krishnanagar) (GOC - Lieutenant General T N Raina)

- 50th Independent Parachute Brigade (less 2 Para Bn Gp) – Brigadier M Thomas
- 8th Mountain Artillery Brigade
- 58th, 68th and 263rd Engineering Regiments
- 9th Infantry Division (GOC - Major General Dalbir Singh)
  - 32 Infantry Brigade – Brigadier M Tewari
  - 42 Infantry Brigade – Brigadier J. M. Jhoria
  - 350 Infantry Brigade – Brigadier H. S. Sandhu
  - 9th Artillery Brigade
- 4th Mountain Division (HQ - Krishnanagar) (GOC - Major General M S Barar)
  - 7th Mountain Brigade – Brigadier Zail Singh
  - 41st Mountain Brigade – Brigadier Tony Michigan
  - 62nd Mountain Brigade - Brigadier Rajinder Nath
  - 4th Mountain Artillery Brigade

IV Corps (HQ - Agartala) GOC - Lieutenant General Sagat Singh

- Corps Artillery Brigade
- Three Independent Tank Squadrons
- 8th Mountain Division (GOC - Major General K. V. Krishna Rao)
  - Echo Force Brigade – Brigadier Wadeker
  - 59th Mountain Brigade – Brigadier C. A. Quinn
  - 81st Mountain Brigade – Brigadier R. C. V. Apte
  - 2nd Mountain Artillery Brigade
- 57th Mountain Division (GOC - Major General B.F. Gonsalves)
  - 311th Mountain Brigade – Brigadier Mishra
  - 73rd Mountain Brigade – Brigadier Tuli
  - 61st Mountain Brigade – Brigadier Tom Pande
  - 57th Mountain Artillery Brigade
- 23rd Mountain Division (GOC - Major General R.D. Hira)
  - 301st Mountain Brigade – Brigadier H. S. Sodhi
  - 181st Mountain Brigade – Brigadier Y. C. Bakshi
  - 83rd Mountain Brigade – Brigadier B. S. Sandhu
  - 23rd Mountain Artillery Brigade
  - Kilo Force Brigade – Brigadier Ananda Swaroop containing:
  - Mizo Range Hills Brigade

XXXIII Corps (HQ - Siliguri) (GOC - Lieutenant General M L Thapan)

- Corps Artillery Brigade
- 471st Engineering Brigade – Colonel Suri
- 235th Army Engineering Regiment
- 2 Para Bn Gp
- MF Brigade – Brigadier Prem Singh
- 71st Mountain Brigade – Brigadier P. N. Kathpalia
- 20th Mountain Division (HQ - Balurghat) (GOC - Major General Lachhman Singh)
  - 66th Mountain Brigade – Brigadier G. S. Sharma
  - 165th Mountain Brigade – Brigadier R. S. Pannu
  - 202nd Mountain Brigade – Brigadier F. P. Bhatty
  - 3rd Armoured Brigade – Brigadier G. Singh Sidhu
  - 20th Mountain Artillery Brigade
  - 340th Mountain Brigade Group – Brigadier Joginder Singh
- 6th Mountain Division ( HQ - Cooch Behar) (Eastern Command HQ Reserve) (GOC - Major General P C Reddy)
  - 9th Mountain Brigade – Brigadier Tirit Varma
  - 99th Mountain Brigade
  - 6th Mountain Artillery Brigade

101st Communication Zone (HQ: Guwahati) (GOC - Major General Gurbax Singh Gill)

- 312 Air Defence Brigade
- 342 Ind. Air Defence Brigade
- 95th Mountain Brigade – Brigadier Hardev Singh Kler
- FJ Sector Brigade – Brigadier Sant Singh
- 167th Infantry Brigade – Brigadier Irani (allotted after 8 December 1971)
- 5th Mountain Brigade (allotted after 8 December 1971)

On 16 December 1971, the Eastern Command of the Pakistan Armed Forces surrendered at Dhaka. East Pakistan ceased to exist and Bangladesh was born. Lt Gen J S Arora accepted the Pakistani Instrument of Surrender, signed by Lt Gen A. A. K. Niazi at Dacca Racecourse. Approximately 93,000 Pakistani servicemen were taken prisoner by the Indian Army, which included 79,676 to 81,000 uniformed personnel of the Pakistan Armed Forces, including some Bengali soldiers who had remained loyal to Pakistan.

== Structure ==
The Command's Area of responsibility covers West Bengal; Sikkim; Assam; Arunachal Pradesh; Nagaland; Manipur; Mizoram; Tripura; Meghalaya, and Jharkhand.

The Eastern Command includes III Corps, IV Corps, XVII Corps, XXXIII Corps and the 23rd Infantry Division. It also supervises 101 Area, originally raised at Shillong in 1963 as 101 Communications Zone.

Structure of Eastern Command
| Insignia | Corps/Area | Corps/Area HQ | General Officer Commanding | Assigned Units | Unit HQ |
|---|---|---|---|---|---|
| | III Corps (Spear Corps) | Rangapahar, Nagaland | Lt Gen Abhijit S. Pendharkar | 2 Mountain Division | Dinjan, Assam |
| | III Corps (Spear Corps) | Rangapahar, Nagaland | Lt Gen Abhijit S. Pendharkar | 56 Mountain Division | Likabali, Arunachal Pradesh |
| | III Corps (Spear Corps) | Rangapahar, Nagaland | Lt Gen Abhijit S. Pendharkar | 57 Mountain Division | Leimakhong, Manipur |
| | IV Corps (Gajraj Corps) | Tezpur, Assam | Lt Gen Neeraj Shukla | 5 Mountain Division | Bomdila, Arunachal Pradesh |
| | IV Corps (Gajraj Corps) | Tezpur, Assam | Lt Gen Neeraj Shukla | 21 Mountain Division | Rangia, Assam |
| | IV Corps (Gajraj Corps) | Tezpur, Assam | Lt Gen Neeraj Shukla | 71 Mountain Division | Missa Mari, Assam |
| | XVII Corps (Brahmastra Corps) | Panagarh, West Bengal | Lt Gen Yash Singh Ahlawat | 59 Mountain Division | Panagarh, West Bengal |
| | XVII Corps (Brahmastra Corps) | Panagarh, West Bengal | Lt Gen Yash Singh Ahlawat | 23rd Infantry Division | Ranchi, Jharkhand |
| | XVII Corps (Brahmastra Corps) | Panagarh, West Bengal | Lt Gen Yash Singh Ahlawat | 17 (Independent) Artillery Brigade | Panagarh, West Bengal |
| | XXXIII Corps (Trishakti Corps) | Siliguri, West Bengal | Lt Gen Man Raj Singh Mann | 17 Mountain Division | Gangtok, Sikkim |
| | XXXIII Corps (Trishakti Corps) | Siliguri, West Bengal | Lt Gen Man Raj Singh Mann | 20 Mountain Division | Binnaguri, West Bengal |
| | XXXIII Corps (Trishakti Corps) | Siliguri, West Bengal | Lt Gen Man Raj Singh Mann | 27 Mountain Division | Kalimpong, West Bengal |
| | 101 Area | Shillong, Meghalaya | Lt Gen Mohit Wadhwa | | |
| | 111 Area | Bengdubi, West Bengal | Lt Gen Pawan Chadha | | |

== Precursors (1902–1947) ==
Following is the list of precursors to the Eastern Command and their commanders:

=== Eastern Command (1902–1907) ===
General Officer Commanding-in-Chief Eastern Command
| S.No | Name | Assumed office | Left office | Unit of Commission | References |
|---|---|---|---|---|---|
| 1 | General Sir Alfred Gaselee GCIE, KCB | October 1904 | June 1907 | 93rd (Sutherland Highlanders) Regiment of Foot | |

=== Eastern Command (1920–1940) ===
General Officer Commanding-in-Chief Eastern Command
| S.No | Name | Assumed office | Left office | Unit of Commission | References |
|---|---|---|---|---|---|
| 1 | General Sir Havelock Hudson KCB, KCIE | November 1920 | February 1924 | Northamptonshire Regiment | |
| 2 | General Sir George de S. Barrow KCB, KCMG | February 1924 | April 1928 | Connaught Rangers | |
| 3 | General Sir John S. M. Shea GCB, KCMG, DSO | April 1928 | April 1932 | Royal Irish Regiment | |
| 4 | General Sir C. Norman MacMullen KCB, CMG, CIE, DSO | April 1932 | April 1936 | Unattached | |
| 5 | General Sir H. B. Douglas Baird KCB, CMG, CIE, DSO | April 1936 | April 1940 | Unattached | |
| 6 | Lieutenant General Sir Charles N. F. Broad KCB, DSO | April 1940 | July 1942 | Royal Field Artillery | |

=== Eastern Army (1942–1943) ===
General Officer Commanding Eastern Army
| S.No | Name | Assumed office | Left office | Unit of Commission | References |
|---|---|---|---|---|---|
| 1 | Lieutenant General Noel M. S. Irwin CB, DSO**, MC | Jul 1942 | May 1943 | Essex Regiment | |
| 2 | General Sir George J. Giffard KCB, DSO | May 1943 | October 1943 | Queen's Royal West Surrey Regiment | |

=== Eastern Command (1943–1947) ===
General Officer Commanding-in-Chief Eastern Command
| S.No | Name | Assumed office | Left office | Unit of Commission | References |
|---|---|---|---|---|---|
| 1 | General Sir A. G. O. Mosley Mayne KCB, CBE, DSO | October 1943 | December 1944 | 13th Duke of Connaught's Own Lancers | |
| 2 | General Sir Richard N. O'Connor KCB, DSO*, MC | January 1945 | October 1945 | Cameronians (Scottish Rifles) | |
| 3 | Lieutenant General Sir Arthur F. Smith KBE, CB, DSO | October 1945 | January 1946 | Coldstream Guards | |
| 4 | Lieutenant General Sir Francis I. S. Tuker KCIE, CB, DSO, OBE | January 1946 | November 1947 | Royal Sussex Regiment | |
| Acting | Lieutenant General F. R. Roy Bucher CB, OBE, MC | August 1946 | August 1947 | Cameronians (Scottish Rifles) | |

== List of GOC-in-C of Eastern Command (1947–present) ==
General Officer Commanding-in-Chief Eastern Command
| S.No | Name | Assumed office | Left office | Unit of Commission | References |
|---|---|---|---|---|---|
| 1 | Lieutenant General Kodandera Madappa Cariappa OBE | November 1947 | January 1948 | 88th Carnatic Infantry | |
| 2 | Lieutenant General Maharaj Shri Rajendrasinhji Jadeja DSO | January 1948 | November 1948 | 2nd Lancers (Gardner's Horse) | |
| 3 | Lieutenant General Thakur Nathu Singh | November 1948 | January 1953 | Rajput Regiment | |
| 4 | Lieutenant General Sant Singh | January 1953 | 30 September 1956 | 1/14 Punjab | |
| 5 | Lieutenant General Kodandera Subayya Thimayya OBE | 1 October 1956 | March 1957 | 19th Hyderabad Regiment | |
| 6 | Lieutenant General Shankarrao Pandurang Patil Thorat KC, DSO | May 1957 | May 1961 | 1/14 Punjab | |
| 7 | Lieutenant General Lionel Protip Sen DSO | May 1961 | 30 April 1963 | 10th Baluch Regiment | |
| 8 | Lieutenant General Paramasiva Prabhakar Kumaramangalam DSO, MBE | 1 May 1963 | November 1963 | Regiment of Artillery | |
| 9 | Lieutenant General Thomas Bryan Henderson Brooks | November 1963 | 31 March 1964 | Maratha Light Infantry | |
| 10 | Lieutenant General Paramasiva Prabhakar Kumaramangalam DSO, MBE | 1 April 1964 | November 1964 | Regiment of Artillery | |
| 11 | Lieutenant General Sam Hormusji Framji Jamshedji Manekshaw MC | 16 November 1964 | 8 June 1969 | 12th Frontier Force Regiment | |
| 12 | Lieutenant General Jagjit Singh Arora PVSM | June 1969 | February 1973 | 2nd Punjab Regiment | |
| 13 | Lieutenant General Naveen Chand Rawlley PVSM, AVSM, MC | February 1973 | 31 July 1974 | Brigade of the Guards | |
| 14 | Lieutenant General Jack Farj Rafael Jacob PVSM | 1 August 1974 | 31 July 1978 | Regiment of Artillery | |
| 15 | Lieutenant General Eric Alexander Vas PVSM | 1 August 1978 | 31 May 1981 | 9th Gorkha Rifles | |
| 16 | Lieutenant General Arun Shridhar Vaidya PVSM, MVC, AVSM | 1 June 1981 | Aug 1983 | 9th Deccan Horse | |
| 17 | Lieutenant General K. Chiman Singh PVSM | August 1983 | 31 January 1986 | Rajputana Rifles | |
| 18 | Lieutenant General Jitendra Kumar Puri PVSM, AVSM | 1 February 1986 | 31 May 1987 | Regiment of Artillery | |
| 19 | Lieutenant General Vishwa Nath Sharma PVSM, AVSM | 1 June 1987 | 30 April 1988 | 16th Light Cavalry | |
| 20 | Lieutenant General Raj Mohan Vohra PVSM, MVC | 1 May 1988 | 31 May 1990 | 4th Horse (Hodson's Horse) | |
| 21 | Lieutenant General Kuldip Singh Brar PVSM, AVSM, VrC | 1 June 1990 | 30 September 1992 | Maratha Light Infantry | |
| 22 | Lieutenant General Jameel Mahmood UYSM | 1 October 1992 | 31 May 1993 | Regiment of Artillery | |
| 23 | Lieutenant General Rameshwar Nath Batra PVSM, VSM | 1 June 1993 | 29 February 1996 | Regiment of Artillery | |
| 24 | Lieutenant General Ravi Eipe PVSM, AVSM | 1 March 1996 | 28 February 1998 | Rajput Regiment | |
| 25 | Lieutenant General Har Ranjit Singh Kalkat PVSM, AVSM | 1 April 1998 | 31 July 2002 | Maratha Light Infantry | |
| 26 | Lieutenant General Jitendra Singh Varma PVSM, AVSM | 1 August 2002 | 31 December 2004 | 63rd Cavalry (India) | |
| 27 | Lieutenant General Arvind Sharma PVSM, AVSM, VSM | 1 January 2005 | 31 December 2006 | 4th Gorkha Rifles | |
| 28 | Lieutenant General Kuldip Singh Jamwal PVSM, AVSM, VSM | 1 January 2007 | 29 February 2008 | Regiment of Artillery | |
| 29 | Lieutenant General Vijay Kumar Singh PVSM, AVSM, YSM | 1 March 2008 | 31 March 2010 | Rajput Regiment | |
| 30 | Lieutenant General Bikram Singh PVSM, UYSM, AVSM, SM, VSM | 1 April 2010 | 30 April 2012 | Sikh Light Infantry | |
| 31 | Lieutenant General Dalbir Singh Suhag PVSM, UYSM, AVSM, VSM | 16 June 2012 | 31 December 2013 | 5th Gorkha Rifles | |
| 32 | Lieutenant General Man Mohan Singh Rai PVSM, AVSM, VSM | 1 January 2014 | 31 July 2015 | Bombay Sappers | |
| 33 | Lieutenant General Praveen Bakshi PVSM, AVSM, VSM | 1 August 2015 | 31 July 2017 | Skinner's Horse | |
| 34 | Lieutenant General Abhay Krishna PVSM, UYSM, AVSM, SM, VSM | 1 August 2017 | 30 September 2018 | Rajputana Rifles | |
| 35 | Lieutenant General Manoj Mukund Naravane PVSM, AVSM, SM, VSM | 1 October 2018 | 31 August 2019 | Sikh Light Infantry | |
| 36 | Lieutenant General Anil Chauhan PVSM, UYSM, AVSM, SM, VSM | 1 September 2019 | 31 May 2021 | 11th Gorkha Rifles | |
| 37 | Lieutenant General Manoj Pande PVSM, AVSM, VSM | 1 June 2021 | 31 January 2022 | Bombay Sappers | |
| 38 | Lieutenant General Rana Pratap Kalita PVSM, UYSM, AVSM, SM, VSM | 1 February 2022 | 31 December 2023 | Kumaon Regiment | |
| 39 | Lieutenant General Ram Chander Tiwari PVSM, UYSM, AVSM, SM | 1 January 2024 | 31 March 2026 | Kumaon Regiment | |
| 40 | Lieutenant General V. M. Bhuvana Krishnan PVSM, AVSM, YSM | 1 April 2026 | Incumbent | Dogra Regiment | |
