= Johnson P Mathew =

Indian Army

Lieutenant General Johnson P Mathew PVSM UYSM AVSM VSM
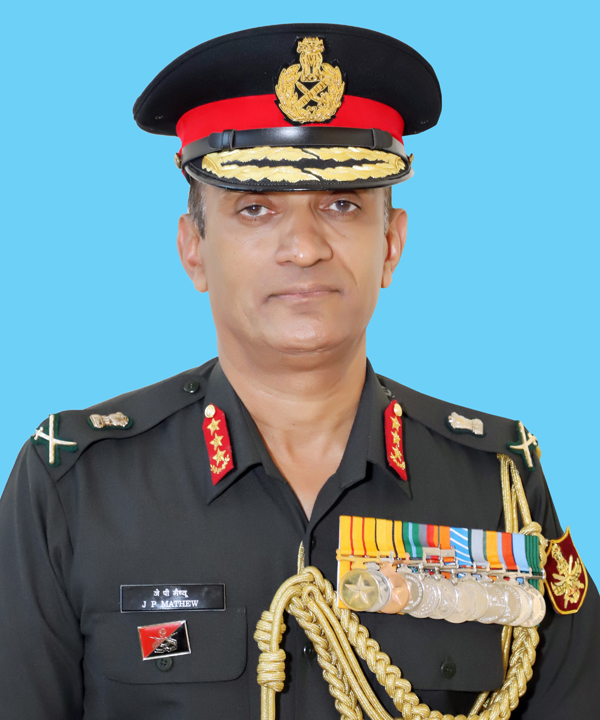

Chief Of Integrated Defence Staff
- In office 3 April 2023 – 30 April 2025
- Chief of Defence Staff: Anil Chauhan
- Preceded by: Balabhadra Radha Krishna
- Succeeded by: Ashutosh Dixit

Personal details
- Education: Indian Military Academy

Military service
- Allegiance: India
- Branch/service: Indian Army
- Years of service: 14 December 1985 - 30 April 2025
- Rank: Lieutenant General
- Unit: Punjab Regiment
- Commands: Chief of Integrated Defence Staff; Uttar Bharat Area; III Corps
- Service number: IC-43370N
- Awards: Param Vishisht Seva Medal; Uttam Yudh Seva Medal; Ati Vishisht Seva Medal; Vishisht Seva Medal

Lieutenant General Johnson P Mathew PVSM, UYSM, AVSM, VSM is a retired general officer of the Indian Army. He previously served as the Chief of Integrated Defence Staff (CISC). He previously served as General Officer Commanding Uttar Bharat Area, prior to that he was General Officer Commanding III Corps.

== Early life and education ==
The General Officer is an alumnus of Sainik School, Kazhakootam. He then attended the National Defence Academy and the Indian Military Academy. He is a graduate of Defence Services Staff College, Army War College and Advanced Professional Programme in Public Administration (APPPA) course at Indian Institute of Public Administration (IIPA), New Delhi.

== Military career ==
He was commissioned into the Punjab Regiment on 14 December 1985 from the Indian Military Academy. He has undertaken Instructional appointments at National Defence Academy, Khadakwasla and Officers Training Academy, Chennai, his staff appointments include service in Mtn Division, Counter Insurgency environment, Sub Area and key appointments at Integrated Headquarters of the Ministry of Defence (ARMY). He has command experience of conventional and counter insurgency operations in Northern/Eastern theatres and has commanded III Corps.

== Personal life ==
The general officer is married to Mrs Ambili Johnson and they have two sons, Ashwin and Aaron.

== Awards and decorations ==
He has been awarded Param Vishisht Seva Medal in 2024, Uttam Yudh Seva Medal in 2022, Ati Vishisht Seva Medal and Vishisht Seva Medal.

Param Vishisht Seva Medal		Uttam Yudh Seva Medal	
Ati Vishisht Seva Medal	Vishisht Seva Medal		Samanya Seva Medal
Special Service Medal	Sainya Seva Medal	High Altitude Service Medal	75th Independence Anniversary Medal
50th Independence Anniversary Medal	30 Years Long Service Medal	20 Years Long Service Medal	9 Years Long Service Medal

== Dates of rank ==
Insignia	Rank	Component	Date of rank
	Second Lieutenant	Indian Army	14 December 1985
	Lieutenant	Indian Army	14 December 1987
	Captain	Indian Army	14 December 1990
	Major	Indian Army	14 December 1996
	Lieutenant Colonel	Indian Army	16 December 2004
	Colonel	Indian Army	15 August 2006
	Brigadier	Indian Army	27 July 2012 (acting); 1 November 2012 (substantive, with seniority from 5 November 2010)
	Major General	Indian Army	2 April 2018 (seniority from 1 June 2015)
	Lieutenant General	Indian Army	1 May 2020

Military offices
Preceded by Rana Pratap Kalita	General Officer Commanding III Corps; 2021 - 2022	Succeeded by Ram Chander Tiwari
Preceded by Surinder Singh Mahal	General Officer Commanding Uttar Bharat Area; 2022 - 2023	Succeeded by Ram Chander Tiwari
Preceded by Balabhadra Radha Krishna	Chief of Integrated Defence Staff; 3 April 2023 - 30 April 2025	Succeeded by Air Marshal Ashutosh Dixit
