= Ram Chander Tiwari =

Former Lieutenant general of the Indian Army

Lieutenant General Ram Chander Tiwari PVSM UYSM AVSM SM
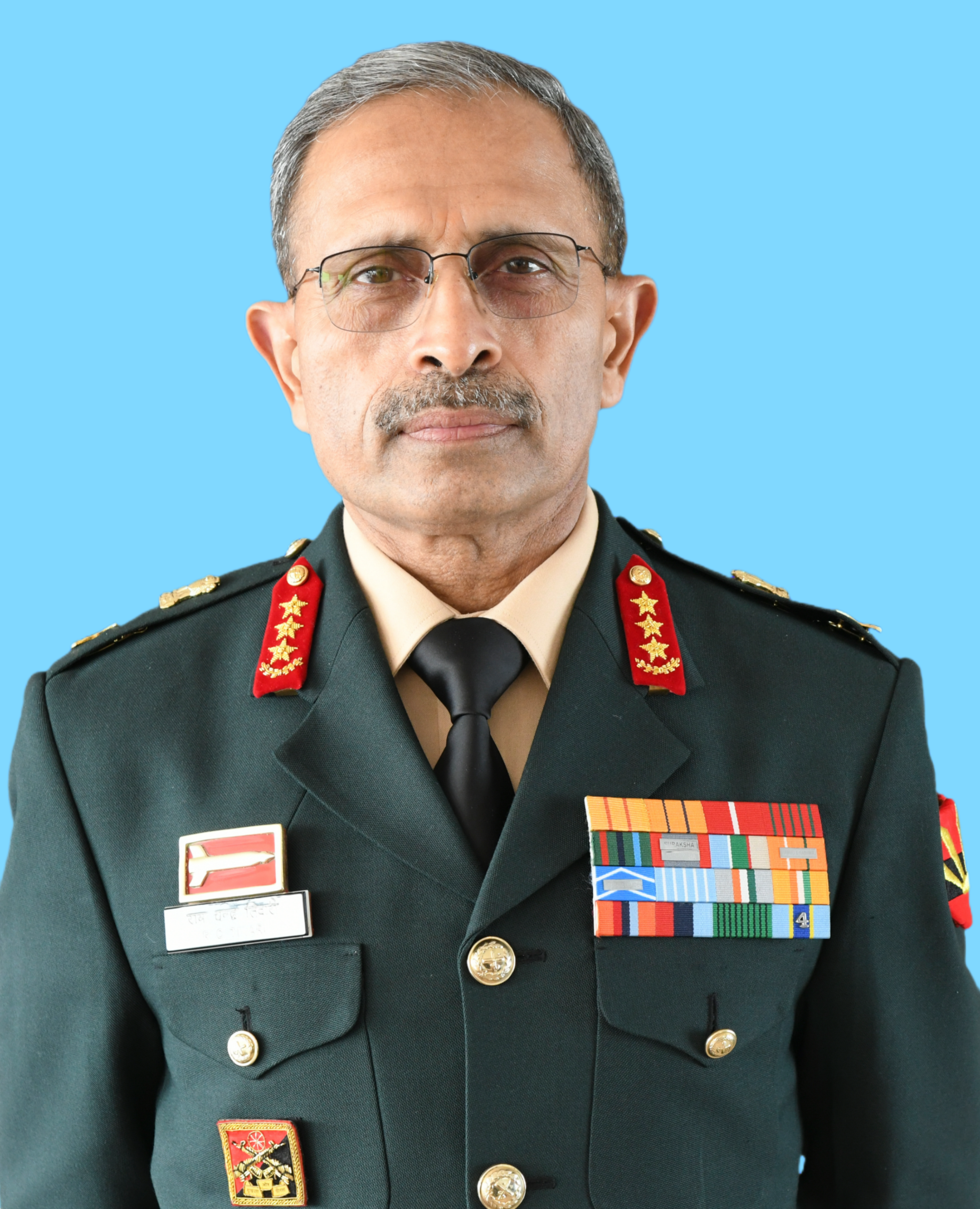

General Officer Commanding-in-Chief Eastern Command
- In office 1 January 2024 – 31 March 2026
- Chief of Army Staff: Manoj Pande; Upendra Dwivedi
- Preceded by: Rana Pratap Kalita
- Succeeded by: V. M. Bhuvana Krishnan

Military service
- Allegiance: India
- Branch/service: Indian Army
- Years of service: 13 June 1987 – 31 March 2026
- Rank: Lieutenant General
- Unit: 4 Kumaon Regiment
- Commands: Eastern Command; Uttar Bharat Area; III Corps; 17th Infantry Division; 4 Kumaon Regiment
- Service number: IC-44498L
- Awards: Param Vishisht Seva Medal; Uttam Yudh Seva Medal; Ati Vishisht Seva Medal; Sena Medal

Lieutenant General Ram Chander Tiwari, PVSM, UYSM, AVSM, SM is a retired general officer of the Indian Army. He last served as the General Officer Commanding (GOC)-in-Chief Eastern Command. He previously served as the GOC Uttar Bharat Area, and before that as GOC III Corps. He earlier held the appointment of Chief of Staff of the South Western Command.

== Early life and education ==
Tiwari is an alumnus of National Defence Academy, Khadakwasla and the Indian Military Academy, Dehradun. He has attended the Defence Services Staff College, Higher Defence Management Course and National Defence College, New Delhi. He is also a graduate of Swiss Army Chemical Warfare School and US Army Infantry School, Fort Benning, USA.

== Military career ==
He was commissioned into the 4th battalion of the Kumaon Regiment on 13 June 1987 from the Indian Military Academy. Tiwari served as a Brigade Major of a mountain brigade along Northern Borders. He also served a Rashtriya Rifles battalion as 2IC and commanded his battalion in active counter-insurgency area of Assam (OP RHINO).

He served three tenures in Military Operations Directorate, Col General Staff of a Mountain Division in High Altitude in J&K, DDG KRA Cell in COAS Sectt and Dy MS in Military Secretary's Branch. He then served twice with the United Nations, first as a Military Observer and later as Deputy Chief of Staff at Force HQ in Democratic Republic of the Congo.

He commanded a mountain brigade in North Sikkim, wherein he was rewarded with Sena Medal. He also commanded the 17th Infantry Division along the Line of Actual Control, wherein he was awarded Ati Vishisht Seva Medal.

After being promoted to the rank of Lieutenant General, he was appointed as the Chief of Staff of the South Western Command. In March 2022, he took over as the GOC of III Corps in the Eastern Theatre. Tiwari was awarded Uttam Yudh Seva Medal for his distinguished service while commanding III Corps in Eastern Theatre. A year later in April 2023, Tiwari took over the command of Uttar Bharat Area.

On 1 January 2024, he took over as the General Officer Commanding-in-Chief Eastern Command succeeding Lieutenant General Rana Pratap Kalita who superannuated on 31 December 2023.

== Awards and decorations ==
Tiwari has been awarded with the Param Vishisht Seva Medal in 2025, the Uttam Yudh Seva Medal in 2023, the Ati Vishisht Seva Medal and the Sena Medal.

Param Vishisht Seva Medal	Uttam Yudh Seva Medal	Ati Vishisht Seva Medal	Sena Medal
Samanya Seva Medal	Special Service Medal	Operation Parakram Medal	Sainya Seva Medal
High Altitude Medal	Videsh Seva Medal	75th Independence Anniversary Medal	50th Independence Anniversary Medal
30 Years Long Service Medal	20 Years Long Service Medal	9 Years Long Service Medal	MONUSCO

== Dates of rank ==
Insignia	Rank	Component	Date of rank
	Second Lieutenant	Indian Army	13 June 1987
	Lieutenant	Indian Army	13 June 1989
	Captain	Indian Army	13 June 1992
	Major	Indian Army	13 June 1998
	Lieutenant-Colonel	Indian Army	16 December 2004
	Colonel	Indian Army	1 January 2008
	Brigadier	Indian Army	7 June 2013 (acting); 1 April 2014 (substantive, with seniority from 8 January 2012)
	Major General	Indian Army	18 February 2019 (seniority from 1 January 2018)
	Lieutenant-General	Indian Army	27 September 2021

Military offices
Preceded by Rana Pratap Kalita	General Officer Commanding-in-Chief Eastern Command; 1 January 2024 – 31 March 2026	Succeeded by V. M. Bhuvana Krishnan
Preceded by Johnson P Mathew	General Officer Commanding Uttar Bharat Area; April 2023 - 31 December 2023	Succeeded by Zubin A. Minwalla
Preceded by Johnson P Mathew	General officer commanding III Corps; 2 March 2022 – 5 March 2023	Succeeded by Harjeet Singh Sahi
