= Rana Pratap Kalita =

Indian army general

Lieutenant General Rana Pratap Kalita PVSM UYSM AVSM SM VSM
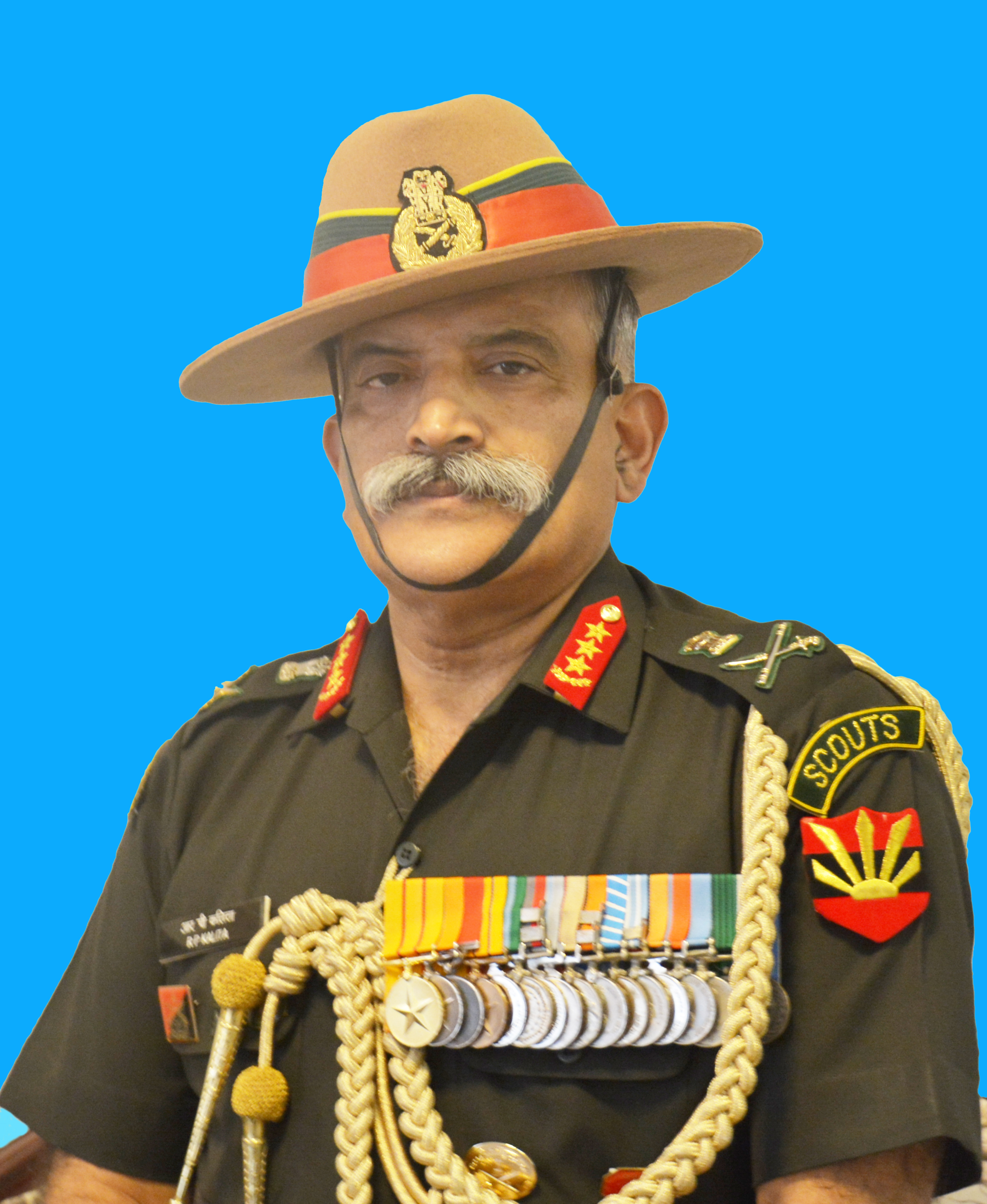

General Officer Commanding-in-Chief Eastern Command
- In office 1 February 2022 – 31 December 2023
- Chief of Army Staff: Manoj Mukund Naravane; Manoj Pande
- Preceded by: Manoj Pande
- Succeeded by: Ram Chander Tiwari

Personal details
- Born: Rangiya, Kamrup, Assam, India
- Spouse: Nisha Kalita
- Awards: Assam Baibhav (2024)

Military service
- Allegiance: India
- Branch/service: Indian Army
- Years of service: 9 June 1984 – 31 December 2023
- Rank: Lieutenant General
- Unit: Kumaon Regiment
- Commands: Eastern Command; III Corps; Officers Training Academy; 19th Infantry Division; 71 Infantry Brigade; 13 Rashtriya Rifles
- Service number: IC-42004X
- Awards: Param Vishisht Seva Medal; Uttam Yudh Seva Medal; Ati Vishisht Seva Medal; Sena Medal; Vishisht Seva Medal

Lieutenant General Rana Pratap Kalita, PVSM, UYSM, AVSM, SM, VSM is a former general officer in the Indian Army. He served as the General Officer Commanding-in-Chief (GOC-in-C) of the Indian Army's Eastern Command. He previously commanded the III Corps at Dimapur.

== Early life and education ==
He was born in Rangia of Kamrup District to Jogendra Kalita & Renu Kalita. He is an alumnus of Sainik School, Goalpara. He then attended the National Defence Academy, Khadakwasla and the Indian Military Academy.

== Military career ==
General Kalita was commissioned in 9 Kumaon Regiment on 9 June 1984 from Indian Military Academy Dehradun. The General Officer commanded a Rashtriya Rifles Battalion during a counter insurgency in Jammu & Kashmir, Mountain Brigade in peace, an Infantry Division in Jammu & Kashmir and Corps in North East. He served in various operations including operation PAWAN in Sri Lanka, operation PARAKRAM & Op RAKSHAK in J&K, operation BAJRANG & operation RHINO in Assam, operation ORCHID in Nagaland and operation HIFAZAT in Manipur. THe has held varied staff appointments including Col GS of a Division and BGS (Ops) of a Corps in highly active Counter Insurgency environment. In addition, he has held appointments in MS Branch, OL Dte, AG’s Branch in IHQ of MoD (Army) and Chief of the Staff, HQ Eastern Comd. He has also served as Instructor in OTA Chennai and Directing Staff in a wing of Army War College, Mhow. The General Officer had two tenures in United Nations, as a Military Observer in Sierra Leone and Chief Operations Officer in Sudan. He had commanded III Corps and was the Chief of Staff of Eastern Command. He also served as Director General - Manpower Planning and Personnel Services at Army Headquarters. General Kalita is a recipient of PVSM, UYSM, AVSM, SM and VSM.

He became the first person from Assam to hold the charge of General Officer-Commanding-in-Chief of the Eastern Command. He succeeded Lieutenant General Manoj Pande on his elevation to Vice Chief of the Army Staff. The General Officer was also the Colonel of the KUMAON & NAGA Regiment and KUMAON SCOUTS.

== Personal life ==
General Kalita is married to Mrs Nisha Kalita; the couple have two children. Their son is commissioned in the Army and is a serving officer in 9 KUMAON, and their daughter is a lecturer in Delhi University.

== Awards and decorations ==
Across his military career Gen Kalita received numerous military decorations. The general officer was awarded with the Param Vishisht Seva Medal in 2023, Uttam Yudh Seva Medal, Ati Vishisht Seva Medal, Sena Medal and Vishisht Seva Medal.

| Param Vishisht Seva Medal | Uttam Yudh Seva Medal | | Ati Vishisht Seva Medal |
| Sena Medal | Vishisht Seva Medal | Samanya Seva Medal | Special Service Medal |
| Siachen Glacier Medal | Operation Vijay Medal | Operation Parakram Medal | Sainya Seva Medal |
| High Altitude Service Medal | Videsh Seva Medal | 75th Anniversary of Independence Medal | 50th Anniversary of Independence Medal |
| 30 Years Long Service Medal | 20 Years Long Service Medal | 9 Years Long Service Medal | UNAVEM III Medal |

== Dates of rank ==
| Insignia | Rank | Component | Date of rank |
|---|---|---|---|
| | Second Lieutenant | Indian Army | 9 June 1984 |
| | Lieutenant | Indian Army | 9 June 1986 |
| | Captain | Indian Army | 9 June 1989 |
| | Major | Indian Army | 9 June 1995 |
| | Lieutenant-Colonel | Indian Army | 16 December 2004 |
| | Colonel | Indian Army | 1 April 2006 |
| | Brigadier | Indian Army | 13 June 2011 (acting); 8 August 2011 (substantive, with seniority from 19 March 2010) |
| | Major General | Indian Army | 19 October 2016 (seniority from 1 February 2015) |
| | Lieutenant-General | Indian Army | 10 May 2019 |

Military offices
| Preceded by Rajiv Sirohi | General Officer Commanding III Corps; 11 January 2020 – 10 February 2021 | Succeeded by Johnson P Mathew |
| Preceded by Manoj Pande | General Officer Commanding-in-Chief Eastern Command; 1 February 2022 - 31 December 2023 | Succeeded by Ram Chander Tiwari |
