= V. M. Bhuvana Krishnan =

Lieutenant General in the Indian Army

Lieutenant General V. M. Bhuvana Krishnan PVSM AVSM YSM
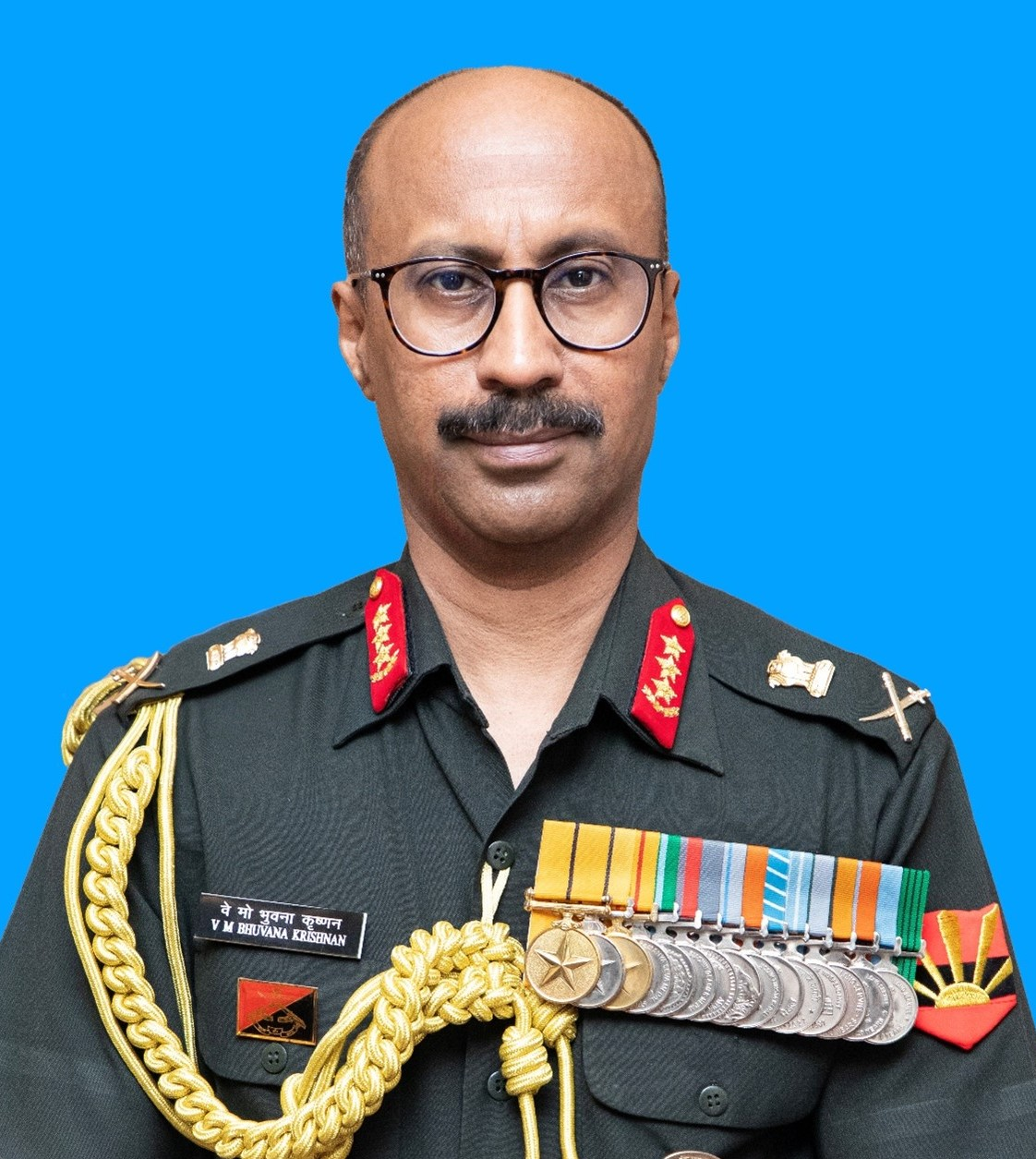
- Official Portrait, 2026

General Officer Commanding-in-Chief Eastern Command
- Incumbent
- Assumed office 1 April 2026
- Chief of Army Staff: Upendra Dwivedi
- Preceded by: Ram Chander Tiwari

Quartermaster General
- In office 1 December 2023 – 31 March 2026
- Chief of Army Staff: Manoj Pande; Upendra Dwivedi
- Preceded by: Rajinder Dewan
- Succeeded by: Prashant Srivastava

Military service
- Allegiance: India
- Branch/service: Indian Army
- Years of service: 11 June 1988 – Present
- Rank: Lieutenant General
- Unit: Dogra Regiment
- Commands: Eastern Command; XVII Corps; CIJWS; 28 Infantry Division
- Service number: IC-47566Y
- Awards: Param Vishisht Seva Medal; Ati Vishisht Seva Medal; Yudh Seva Medal

Lieutenant General V. M. Bhuvana Krishnan, PVSM, AVSM, YSM is a serving general officer of the Indian Army. He is presently serving as the General Officer Commanding-in-Chief, Eastern Command. He previously served as the Quartermaster General, prior to that he was General Officer Commanding, XVII Corps. He is also the Colonel of the Regiment of the Dogra Regiment & Dogra Scouts since 1 November 2022.

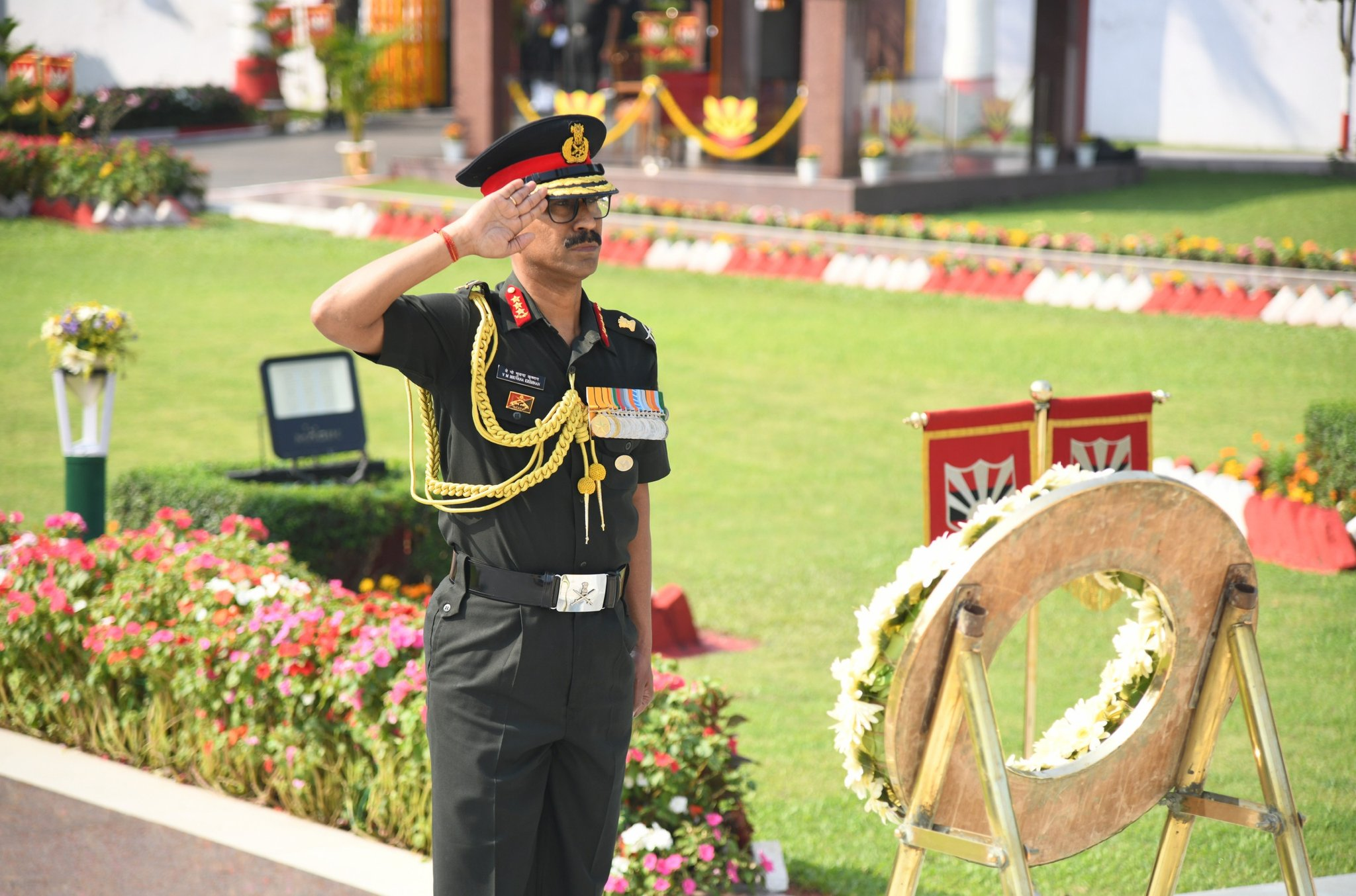
Lt Gen V. M. Bhuvana Krishnan taking over as Eastern Army Commander

== Early life and education ==
He is an alumnus of Sainik School, Amaravathinagar. He then attended the National Defence Academy, Khadakwasla and the Indian Military Academy, Dehradun. He is also an alumnus of the Defence Services Staff College, Wellington and the National Defence College, New Delhi. He is an M.Phil from Devi Ahilya Vishwavidyalaya University and Madras University in Defence & Management Studies and Defence & Strategic Studies.

== Military career ==
He was commissioned into the Dogra Regiment on 11 June 1988 from the Indian Military Academy, Dehradun. In a career spanning over three decades, he has undertaken numerous command, staff and instructional appointments. He has commanded an infantry battalion, a brigade in high-altitude areas along India's northern borders and was General Officer Commanding 28 Infantry Division (Vajr Division) in Jammu & Kashmir. His staff appointments include serving at Military Operation's Directorate, at Military Secretary’s Branch, Integrated Defence Staff and as Military Attaché at the High Commission of India in London. He also served as the Commandant of the Counter Insurgency and Jungle Warfare School.

After being promoted to the rank of Lieutenant General, he assumed the appointment of Director General Information Technology at the Army headquarters, New Delhi. On 25 June 2022, he took over as the General Officer Commanding, XVII Corps succeeding Lieutenant General Rajinder Dewan. A year and a half later, on 1 December 2023 he took over as the Quartermaster General (QMG) of the Indian Army. He relinquished the appointment of QMG on 31 March 2026.

On 1 April 2026, Lieutenant General V. M. Bhuvana Krishnan took over as the General Officer Commanding-in-Chief, Eastern Command succeeding Lieutenant General Ram Chander Tiwari when the latter superannuated on 31 March 2026.

== Awards and decorations ==
During his career, the general officer has been awarded with the Param Vishisht Seva Medal in 2025, the Ati Vishisht Seva Medal in 2022 and the Yudh Seva Medal in 2016. He has also received commendation from the Chief of Army Staff.

Param Vishisht Seva Medal	Ati Vishisht Seva Medal		Yudh Seva Medal
Samanya Seva Medal	Special Service Medal	Siachen Glacier Medal	Operation Vijay Medal
Sainya Seva Medal	High Altitude Medal	Videsh Seva Medal	75th Independence Anniversary Medal
50th Independence Anniversary Medal	30 Years Long Service Medal	20 Years Long Service Medal	9 Years Long Service Medal

== Dates of rank ==
Insignia	Rank	Component	Date of rank
	Second Lieutenant	Indian Army	11 June 1988
	Lieutenant	Indian Army	11 June 1990
	Captain	Indian Army	11 June 1993
	Major	Indian Army	11 June 1999
	Lieutenant Colonel	Indian Army	16 December 2004
	Colonel	Indian Army	11 June 2008
	Brigadier	Indian Army	23 May 2014 (acting) 14 August 2015 (substantive, with seniority from 6 September 2012)
	Major General	Indian Army	4 December 2020 (seniority from 20 November 2018)
	Lieutenant General	Indian Army	6 May 2022

Military offices
Preceded by Ram Chander Tiwari	General Officer Commanding-in-Chief; Eastern Command; 1 April 2026 - Present	Succeeded by Incumbent
Preceded by Rajinder Dewan	Quartermaster General; 1 December 2023 - 31 March 2026	Succeeded by Prashant Srivastava
Preceded by Rajinder Dewan	General officer commanding XVII Corps; 25 June 2022 – 30 November 2023	Succeeded by Rajeev Puri
