= Gopal R =

Lieutenant General R Gopal PVSM, UYSM, AVSM, SM
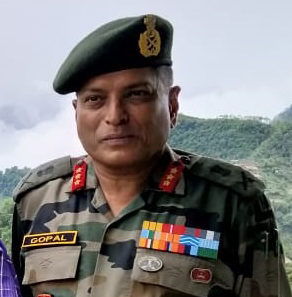
- Born: Trichur.
- Military career
- Allegiance: India
- Branch: Indian Army
- Rank: Lieutenant General
- Unit: 8 Gorkha Rifles
- Commands: III Corps
- Awards: Uttam Yudh Seva Medal; Ati Vishisht Seva Medal; Sena Medal

Lieutenant General R Gopal, PVSM, UYSM, AVSM, SM is a serving General Officer in the Indian Army. He retired as the Quarter Master General of the Indian Army. Previously, he commanded III Corps.

== Early life and education ==
He is an alumnus of Higher Command Course at Defence Services Staff College, Wellington; and National Defence Course Course at National Defence College, Delhi.

== Career ==
He was commissioned into 8 Gorkha Rifles. He has extensive experience in Northeast India. He has held numerous commands including an infantry battalion on the Siachen Glacier; a Mountain Brigade and an Assam Rifles range in South Assam. He was also one of the founding members of the Defence Command and Staff College at Botswana.

During his career, he has been awarded the Uttam Yudh Seva Medal, Ati Vishisht Seva Medal and the Sena Medal for his service.

== Honours and decorations ==

Uttam Yudh Seva Medal		Ati Vishisht Seva Medal	
Sena Medal	Samanya Seva Medal	Special Service Medal	Siachen Glacier Medal
Operation Parakram Medal	Sainya Seva Medal	High Altitude Service Medal	Videsh Seva Medal
50th Anniversary of Independence Medal	30 Years Long Service Medal	20 Years Long Service Medal	9 Years Long Service Medal

Military offices
Preceded by Anil Chauhan	General Officer Commanding III Corps; 9 January 2018 - Present	Succeeded by Incumbent
