= XVII Corps (India) =

Military field formation of the Indian Army

- Formation sign of Brahmastra Corps
- Active: 2013 – Present
- Country: India
- Branch: Indian Army
- Role: Mountain Strike Corps
- Size: Corps
- Part of: Eastern Command
- Garrison/HQ: Panagarh
- Nickname: Brahmastra Corps

Commanders
- Current commander: Lt Gen Sameer S Kartikeya; YSM SM

XVII Corps is the first mountain strike corps of India which has been built as a quick reaction force and as well as counter offensive force against China along LAC. Its headquarters are located at Panagarh in West Bengal under Eastern Command. It is also known as Brahmastra Corps.

== History ==
Republic of India shares a boundary (LAC) of length 4,057 km with Tibet autonomous region. The two countries still have not resolved their disagreement about where exactly the border lies; specially over two regions – Aksai Chin and Arunachal Pradesh. Intrusion of troops of PLA into Indian territory, construction of watch tower close to the mutually-accepted "border patrolling line" near Burtse, "standardization" of the names of six towns in Arunachal Pradesh (China claims that Arunachal Pradesh is integral part of China) enhanced the tension.

In addition, China has developed a rail network and five fully operational airbases in Tibet Autonomous Region. Key airfields include those at Hoping, Pangta and Kong Ka. In Tibet and Yunan, roads are extended over 58,000 km (in 2010) up to the border, at an approximate cost of about $325 billion. As a result of all these buildout of infrastructures, China can mobilize 30 divisions (over 15,000 soldiers each) aside heading to the LAC within 48 hours. Moreover, about 300,011 PLA troops and six Rapid Reaction Forces are placed at Chengdu.

To reinforce defensive power across the border in Arunachal Pradesh, the Indian Army raised two new infantry divisions (1,260 officers and 35,000 soldiers) at Likapani and Missamari (Assam) in 2009–2010. However PLA outnumbered Indian army near border by three to one.

The formation of a Mountain Strike Corps was first proposed in the year 2000.

On 13 January 2013, the Indian Army put forward a proposal to raise the Corps. The proposal also included raising two additional independent infantry divisions as well as two armoured division (including mechanised infantry units) which overall would cost around ₹81,000 crore (equivalent to ₹1.5 trillion or US$16 billion in 2026) to be spent within seven years (12th Plan period (2012–17), with a little spillover into the 13th plan if necessary). The 12th Plan had already been allocated ₹62,000 crore (equivalent to ₹1.1 trillion or US$12 billion in 2026) for the Corps and the Army had asked for additional ₹19,000 crore (equivalent to ₹350 billion or US$3.7 billion in 2026) in the proposal. The Corps would reportedly give the Army offensive capabilities across the Tibet Autonomous Region. The proposal had been approved by the Chiefs of Staff Committee (CoSC), a committee composed of the chiefs of the Army, Navy and Air Force. The proposal then headed for the Cabinet Committee on Security (CCS), headed by the Prime Minister and including the Defence Minister and the Finance Minister among others. The Corps was referred to the by the government earlier in 2012 for further thinking and refinement of the proposal. Two high-altitude divisions would be formed under the Corps.

On 13 July 2013, the Cabinet Committee on Security gave the in principle approval for raising of the Corps at the cost of ₹64,678 crore (equivalent to ₹1.2 trillion or US$12 billion in 2026) to be spent throughout the 12th Plan period. The overall budget included ₹39,209 crore (equivalent to ₹730 billion or US$7.6 billion in 2026) for capital expenditure. The Corps will have a strength of 90,274 soldiers and based at Panagarh (West Bengal).

From October 2013, the army started posting key officers in Ranchi, Jharkhand. On 1 January 2014, Lieutenant General Raymond Joseph Noronha, the first commander of 17 Corps, raised the flag of the XVII Corps for the first time in Ranchi, the temporary headquarters. The raising cost was ₹26,155 crore (equivalent to ₹460 billion or US$4.7 billion in 2026). The headquarters would be permanently shifted to Panagarh in around 2015.

In 2015, the raising of the Corps came to a halt due to financial constraints. As the government reportedly allocate the required funds for raising the Corps while the plans were approved in 2013. The final Corps size was planned to be "trimmed" as this was not a financially viable project. The Army had to utilise funds from its critical War Wastage Reserves (WWR) due to lack of funds.

As of May 2017, the Army had started raising of the second division (72 Division) under the XVII Corps after the formation of 59 Division was almost completed. The new Division, to be based at Pathankot, would initially consist of one Brigade with plans to increase the strength to three Brigades. Raising of the Division was o be completed in three years.

The corps was relocated from Ranchi to Panagarh in 2019.

As of 2021, only one Division was raised under 17 MSC with a strength of 16,000 personnel while the raising of another division at Pathankot was shelved. After 2020–2021 China–India skirmishes, 10,000 soldiers were reportedly added. The Corps Area of Responsibility was restricted to Sikkim and the Northeast India from the earlier responsibility if entire Northern borders. This was as part of Army's overall restructuring after the clashes.

As of April 2024, the raising of the 72 Division was stopped midway due to "paucity of funds". In March 2025, a report suggested that the 72 Division was now being raised under the aegis of XIV Corps and would support the existing 3 Division with the Area of Responsibility of Eastern Ladakh. The HQ along with one Brigade was already deployed while the larger elements were being trained in western parts of India.

== Order of Battle (ORBAT) ==
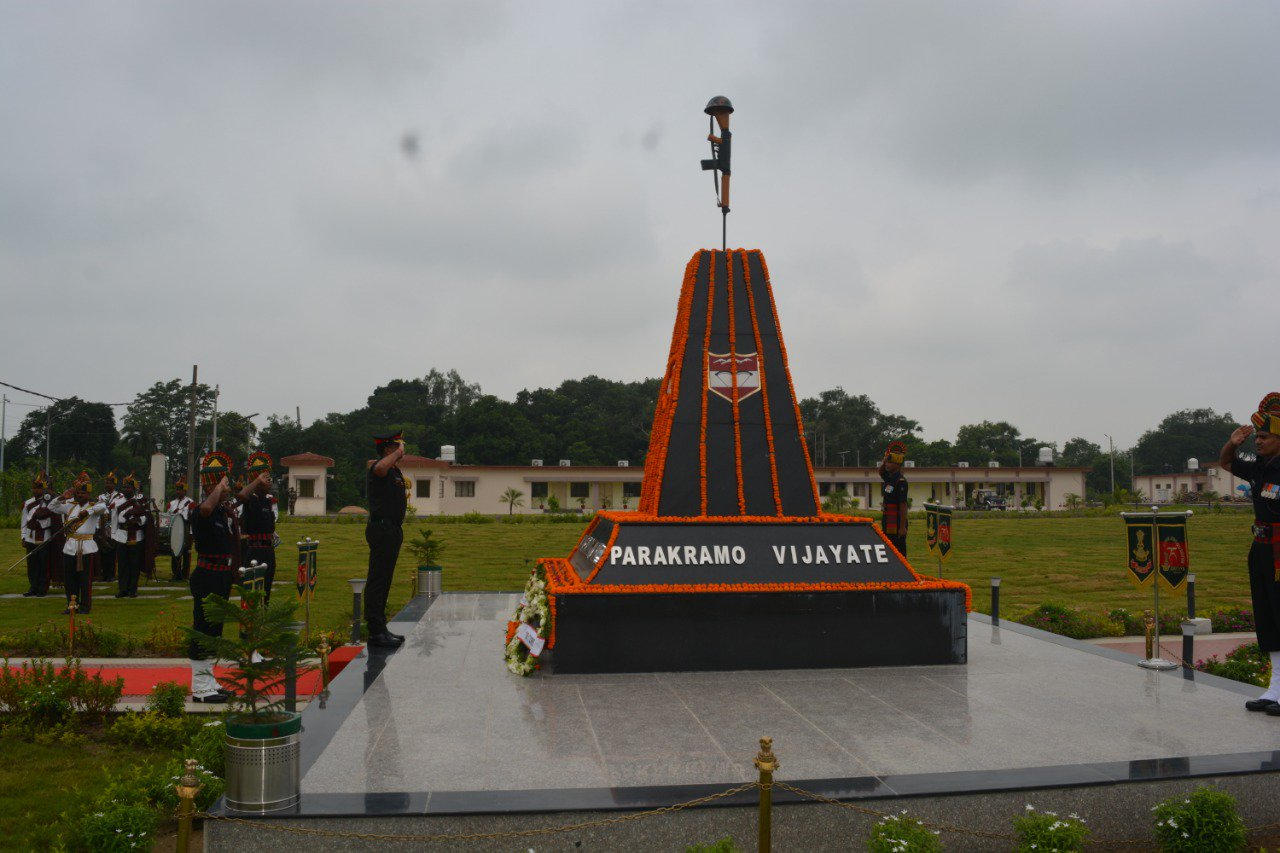
17 Corps War Memorial at Panagarh.

The initial plan at the time of raising was to have the corps with two infantry divisions, two independent armoured brigades and artillery, engineer, air defence and aviation brigades. Because of budgetary constraints, the raising was halted in 2018, leaving a truncated force comprising the Corps HQ, one infantry division and specific other combat and combat support elements. The 17 Corps was also expected to have 30 infantry brigades and 2 Para SF brigades.

The Corps has served as the testbed to validate the Integrated Battle Group concept and four such formations are expected to be operationalised from 1 July 2026 onwards. The formations will operate as subordinate units of the 23 and 59 Divisions. A fire support group (FSG) will also be formed under the Corps HQ to provide fire support to the IBGs. The FSG may incorporate the newly formed Divyastra batteries.

The Corps consists of -

- 23 Infantry Division - The division has been moved from I Corps to XVII Corps. As I Corps moved to South Western Command, the division is situated at Ranchi.
- 59 Infantry Division - Established at Panagarh. It consists of six Brigades, of which three are Infantry and one each of Engineers, Air Defence and Artillery.
  - Three Integrated Battle Groups
- 17 Artillery Brigade - Raised in 2020–21. Includes multiple guns like including M777 howitzer (Ultra Light Howitzers).
- One Rudra brigades

== Testbed for Integrated Battle Groups ==
The XVII Corps was one of the Corps, along with IX Corps, were used as the testbeds to explore the concept of Integrated Battle Group (IBG) combined arms formations. The concept was initially conceived in 2013 during a field exercise in Punjab and was later revived in 2018 by the then Chief of the Army Staff (CoAS) General Bipin Rawat.

The Integrated Battle Groups were Brigade-sized, self-sufficient combined arms units commanded by an officer of the rank Major General. They were meant to transform the overall field formation of the Indian Army. The concept was tested with the IX Corps by July 2019 and were undergoing certain reorganisation based on few feedbacks. The new restructuring will further reduce the 72-hours response time determined in the Cold Start Doctrine to under 24 hours. Their resources and structure would be decided based on the threat and terrain at the deployment location. An IBG would include 5,000 troops and sub units from multiple arms like infantry, armoured, artillery and air defence. In October 2019, the XVII Corps conducted Exercise Him Vijay, the first field implementation of such a formation, which included three IBGs from the 59 Infantry Division.

By May 2022, the IBGs were test-bedded by IX Corps and further validated by the XVII Corps. The Army identified these Corps for total 'IBG-isation', which would be done parallel to the formation of Integrated Theatre Commands to integrate the Armed Forces into larger theatres. The IBGs will replace the traditional Brigades (3,000-3,500 troops) and Divisions (10,000-12,000 troops) existing in the Army.

As of June 2024, 2 IBGs under 9 Corps and 5 IBGs under 17 Corps had been raised two phases, respectively. These formations were war-gamed and validated in multiple exercises. The Army HQ had earlier submitted the report on Phase-1 of 'IBG-isation' to the Defence Ministry while the same for Phase 2 was to be submitted before issuing the official Government Sanction Letter (GSL). The original plan was to first carve out 8-10 IBGs (5,000 to 6,000 troops each) initially and then create more over the years. As of now, the Army has 14 Corps (40,000 to 70,000 troops each), with four of them being strike formations. By November 2024, the Army submitted a draft Government Sanction Letter seeking official approval for the establishment of these IBGs. The issuing of the GSL will imply the approval for the implementation of IBGs. Post approval, the Army aims to have the IBGs operational by 2025.

On 26 July 2025, on the occasion of 26th Kargil Vijay Diwas, the CoAS General Upendra Dwivedi introduced the Rudra all-arms brigades in Drass War Memorial. The plan includes conversion of 250 single-arm brigades to all-arms ones with integration of fighting elements like infantry, mechanised infantry, armoured (tanks), Special Forces as well as support elements like artillery, engineers, air defence, electronic warfare and UAVs (unmanned aerial vehicles). The formations will receive specially prepared logistics for support and combat support. The design of the all-arms brigade itself evolved from the IBG concept with few but major modifications including these brigades being slightly larger than standard brigades against the IBG which were scaled-down Divisions. Also, the Rudra units will be commanded by a Brigadier-ranked officer, unlike a Major General-commanded IBG formation. While one brigade each, under the IX and XVII Corps, have already been converted to Rudra brigade, they are likely to be operationalised with few months.

In January 2026, a report revealed plans of the Indian Army to convert two Divisions under XVII Corps. The plans have been fast-tracked according to sources. The IBGs will comprise a Major General-ranked commanding officer with a size of over 5,000 troops but without any Brigade commander. The IBG will be able to draw logistics and other support elements from units placed under its respective Corps HQ, while a dedicated group can also be established to draw fire support. However, their implementation remains under discussion and could be further refined before deployment. The approach to capability development is based on capacity assessments, not on a threat-based model..

== Mascot ==
The corps mascot is the Snow leopard, signifying strength, resolve and bravery - traits associated with the predator, with which it shares its geographical habitat.

== Exercise ==
Name	Date	Location	Notes, References
HimVijay	October 2019	High Altitude Areas of Arunachal Pradesh along LAC	Debut Exercise of XVII Corps.; Debut IBG exercise in Eastern Command; IV Corps & IAF participated.
	October 2021	Arunachal Pradesh	

== List of General Officers Commanding ==
Rank	Name	Assumed Office	Left office	Unit of Commission	Reference
Lieutenant General	Raymond Joseph Noronha	1 January 2014	April 2015	Rajput Regiment	(Note: At the time of raising the corps, General Noronha had not yet picked up the rank of Lieutenant General, which he shortly did after assuming command.)
Lieutenant General	Lalit Kumar Pandey	April 2015	2016	The Grenadiers	
Lieutenant General	Rajeev Chopra	2016	2017	Madras Regiment	
Lieutenant General	Sudarshan Shrikant Hasabnis	2017	June 2018	Bombay Sappers	
Lieutenant General	Pandala Nagesh Rao	June 2018	15 June 2019	Parachute Regiment	
Lieutenant General	Shashank Shekhar Mishra	15 June 2019	June 2020	Kumaon Regiment	
Lieutenant General	Savneet Singh	June 2020	June 2021	Garhwal Rifles	
Lieutenant General	Rajinder Dewan	19 June 2021	24 June 2022	Sikh Regiment	
Lieutenant General	V. M. Bhuvana Krishnan	24 June 2022	30 September 2023	Dogra Regiment	
Lieutenant General	Rajeev Puri	1 October 2023	19 November 2024	Rajput Regiment	
Lieutenant General	Yash Ahlawat	20 November 2024	30 August 2026	Madras Regiment	
Lieutenant General	Sameer S. Kartikeya	31 August 2026	Incumbent	Jammu and Kashmir Rifles	
