= III Corps (India) =

Military field formation of the Indian Army

- Indian Army III Corps Formation Sign
- Active: 1915–1919; 1941–1942; 1985–present
- Country: India
- Branch: Indian Army
- Role: Mountain (Holding) Corps
- Size: Corps
- Part of: Eastern Command
- Garrison/HQ: Dimapur
- Nickname: Spear Corps

Commanders
- Current commander: Lt Gen Girish Kalia
- Notable commanders: Lt Gen Johnson P Mathew; Lt Gen Ram Chander Tiwari; Lt Gen Rana Pratap Kalita; General Anil Chauhan; Lt Gen Abhay Krishna; General Bipin Rawat; General Dalbir Singh Suhag; Lt Gen Zameer Uddin Shah; General Bipin Chandra Joshi; Lt Gen Raj Mohan Vohra; Lt Gen Joginder Singh Bakshi

The III Corps is a formation of the Indian Army that was formed during World War I in Mesopotamia during its respective campaign. Prior to the reorganization of the British and Indian forces in Mesopotamia, it was designated as the Tigris Corps.

A new III Corps was formed by the Indian Army during World War II for service in Southeast Asia. The corps fought in the Battle of Singapore where it surrendered in February 1942.

It is headquartered in the state of Nagaland of India in the city of Dimapur, at Rangapahar Military Station.

== History ==
3 Corps was raised during World War I by Lt Gen Ahlmer and soon thereafter, the command was changed to Lt Gen Frederick Stanley Maud, who was appointed as the Corps Commander on 09 Dec 1915. 3 Corps was allotted the 6th (Poona) Division and 12th Indian Division along with a Cavalry Brigade and tasked with the defence of the Tigris Line. The Corps thereby earned the sobriquet of "The Tigris Corps". 3 Corps played a major role in the Mesopotamian front, which was a campaign in the middle eastern theatre of World War I, fought between the Allies represented by the British Empire, troops from Britain, Australia and vast majority of British Raj, against the central powers, mostly the Ottoman Empire. The Theatre was vast and consisted of hot, inhospitable desert terrain. Tank warfare had still not achieved its primacy and deserts remained primarily a no man’s land. The fight was concentrated along the course of Tigris and the Euphrates rivers where Ottomans had a head start. The British had realised that they needed to secure and control the delta of Tigris at Shatt-El-Arab and Basra to deny the Ottomans access to Abadan Refinery and the oil rich delta. It also provided the British with a bridgehead for the induction of troops through the sea route and to maintain their forces logistically during future operations in the north. Keeping this as the broad objective, the British dispatched the 6th Indian Division as the Indian Expeditionary Force to Basra in 1915.

The Corps was later split into two separate formations, namely 1 and 3 Corps. I Corps moved northwards towards Mosul, while 3 Corps led a renewed offensive towards Baghdad, which finally fell to 3 Corps in 1916. The composition of 3 Corps was largely Indian troops and the credit for the swift capture of Baghdad was attributed to them. The Allied forces controlled a major part of Mesopotamia because of the fall of Baghdad, and most importantly, had direct access to the sea and the oldest refinery of Asia at Abadan. In view of the strategic objective of bringing Mesopotamia under British control and liberation of Kuwait from Ottoman control being achieved, an armistice was signed between the British and the Ottoman Empire.

The military phase of the operations in the Middle East was over, paving the way for political and diplomatic overtures. 3 Corps which had played a great role in achievement perhaps did not get its due compared to similar forces fighting in the European Theatre. The Corps was finally demobilized in 1919, only to be resurrected in 1941 during World War II.

=== World War II ===
HQ 3 Corps was raised on 27 Apr 1941 with headquarters at Kuala Lumpur. Lt Gen Percy Heath was placed in Command of the Corps. It had two Divisions, namely the 9th and 11th Indian Divisions under command.

11th Indian Division which was tasked to defend Kuala Lumpur and withdraw towards Thailand was outflanked by the Japanese. The Division fought major battles at Jitra from 08-12 Dec 1941, Kampar from 30 Dec 1941 to 02 Jan 1942, Slim River from 06 Jan to 08 Jan 1942, Gemas and Muar River from 14 Jan to 02 Jan 1942 and gave a good account of themselves, despite debilitating logistic shortcoming and virtually no air support. 9th and 11th Indian Division suffered significant casualties without any significant reinforcements.

During the Malayan campaign, 3 Corps had borne the brunt of War, and men suffered from inclement weather and tropical diseases apart from enemy action. Jungle terrain coupled with intolerable tropical weather and humidity made the conditions insuperable. Fighting here required the very best of human endurance, both mental and physical. 3 Corps had fought most of its battles in these virtually inhuman conditions, but there was little coverage of the same. While the trenches of Ypres, Somme, Alsace and Lorraine and those who fought in them were widely covered, the contributions of the anonymous Indians who died in Malaya remain un-recounted. 3 Corps virtually ceased to exist post Feb 1942.

=== III Corps: The Third Reincarnation ===
The Naga insurgency, over a period, gained inroads into the Hill districts of Manipur, Tirap and Changlang district of Arunachal Pradesh bordering Nagaland. 8 Mountain Division was re-raised in 1962 located at Zakhama.

Spear Corps participated in the 1962 Indo – China war. The famous Battle of Walong was in the then NEFA (Arunachal Pradesh). In autumn of 1962, during the Sino-Indian War, Walong was the scene of the Battle of Walong, where the Indian Army 11th Infantry Brigade battled the Chinese advances.[7] The killed and wounded numbered 642 Indians and 752 Chinese.[8] Indians were defeated at Walong, however the Chinese withdrawal allowed India to regain the territory.[6] A canopied memorial to the Indian war dead of 1962 was erected next to the airstrip with the following verses composed by a Walong veteran inscribed on it:[6]

The sentinel hills that round us stand

bear witness that we loved our land.

Amidst shattered rocks and flaming pine

we fought and died on Namti Plain

.

O Lohit gently by us glide

pale stars above us softly shine

as we sleep here in sun and rain.

Spear Corps was the formation directly under Headquarters Eastern Command to conduct operations against Naga insurgents. The spread of insurgency into new areas of Mizoram and Tripura necessitated the induction of additional troops. With the raising of 57 Mountain Division in 1969 at Masimpur, 8 Mountain Division was entrusted with Counter Insurgency Operations in Nagaland and Manipur, while 57 Mountain Division was responsible for conduct of operations in Mizoram and Tripura. Assam Rifles units were also involved in counter insurgency operations under respective brigade sized sector headquarters. There was a need to adopt a common cause and manifest a common effort. It was this requirement which precipitated the thought process for establishing a new headquarters as an umbrella organisation to counter the eco system of insurgency and eradicate it in a comprehensive manner. The seed for raising of a new Corps headquarter was sown in response and the idea of 3 Corps sprouted.

In 1984, Lt Gen Chiman Singh, the then General Officer Commanding-in Chief, Eastern Command deliberated upon the command, control and coordination of operations of the two Divisions fighting insurgency in the North East and decided to coordinate and streamline functioning of both these Formations under a Corps Headquarter. Headquarters 3 Corps was raised on 04 Feb 1985, by Lt Gen Joginder Singh Bakshi, MVC, at Rangapahar Military Station (RMS) in Dimapur (Nagaland) for coordination and conduct of Counter Insurgency Operations in Nagaland, Manipur, Mizoram, Tripura, Meghalaya, South Assam (including Dhubri Districts) and Arunachal Pradesh (Tirap and Changlang districts). 3 Corps replaced 8 Mountain Division as the highest Formation responsible for coordinating Counter Insurgency Operations in Nagaland and the adjoining Naga inhabited areas of other states.

=== Formation Sign : Spears Corps ===
The formation sign is inspired by the primary role of Infantry. Fittingly, the formation signs of the two formations under Head Quarters 3 Corps, the Bayonet of 8 Mountain Division and Crossed Spears of 57 Mountain Division, were superimposed to make the 3 Corps formation sign.

At the time of its formation, 3 Corps consisted of 8 Mountain Division and 57 Mountain Division, under its command. Additionally, Headquarters Inspector General Assam Rifles (North) (IGAR(N) was raised at Jorhat on 15 May 1985 and placed under operational control of 3 Corps. Post raising, the Headquarters IGAR(N) moved to Imphal and took over the operational responsibility of Manipur from 8 Mountain Division on 12 Nov 1986. 8 Mountain Division took over the responsibility of Tirap Sector.

3 Corps was actively involved in counter-insurgency operations in Manipur, Tripura and North Cachar Hills district of Assam. Besides, 3 Corps was also aiding the civil administration and paramilitary forces in maintaining peace in Nagaland and Mizoram. At the time, 3 Corps seemed likely to be replaced by the Directorate-General of Assam Rifles based in Shillong. The 57 Mountain Division based at Leimakhong in Manipur had already been shifted to Meerut in Uttar Pradesh.

Defending the LAC became an additional responsibility, apart from countering insurgency. With this additional responsibility to fulfil, two more Divisions were placed under command of HQ 3 Corps. With the raising of the Division Headquarters, its formations and units commenced its operations on 7 September 2009 under Major General Raj Nandan Singh. It took over the operations and entire responsibility of Western Arunachal Pradesh on 01 Jun 2010.

== Order of battle ==
Jane's estimates that it consists of:

- 2 Mountain Division (Dao Division) – The division joined III Corps in late 2000s and is headquartered at Dinjan, Dibrugarh district, Assam.
  - 5 Mountain Brigade at Aalo (Along) – the oldest infantry brigade in the Indian Army.
  - 82 Mountain Brigade at Tezu in Lohit district
  - 181 Mountain Brigade at Laipuli, Tinsukia
  - 2 Mountain Artillery Brigade at Dinjan
- 56 Infantry Division – was raised at Zakhama, Nagaland and presently located at Likabali, North of the Brahmaputra, Responsible for guarding of northern borders, internal security situation and disaster management in selected districts of Arunachal Pradesh and Assam.
- 57 Mountain Division (Red Shield Division) – headquartered at Leimakhong. Raised in 1966 for counterinsurgency operations in Mizoram. Until 1990, headquartered at Aizawl with III Corps. Globalsecurity.org reports the 57 Mountain Division headquarters are at Manipur near Silchar. The formation and units of 57 Mountain Division are deployed in some of the remotest corner of Manipur and Indo-Burmese border. 57th Mountain Division took part in the Indo-Pakistani War of 1971 as part of IV Corps. It also successfully conducted Operation Golden Bird in 1995 to eliminate rebels in Northeast India.
- 6 Bhairav Battalion

== Commanders ==
Rank	Name	Appointment Date	Left office	Unit of Commission	References
Lieutenant General	Joginder Singh Bakshi	5 March 1985	30 March 1986	Jat Regiment	
Lieutenant General	Raj Mohan Vohra	31 March 1986	20 September 1987	4th Horse (Hodson's Horse)	
Lieutenant General	Vijay Madan	21 September 1987	6 May 1989	4th Gorkha Rifles	
Lieutenant General	Bipin Chandra Joshi	7 May 1989	17 May 1990	2nd Lancers (Gardner's Horse)	
Lieutenant General	B S Nalwa	18 May 1990	13 May 1991	Regiment of Artillery	
Lieutenant General	H K Kapoor	14 May 1991	15 December 1992	Corps of Engineers	
Lieutenant General	N S Malik	16 December 1992	29 October 1994	4th Horse (Hodson's Horse)	
Lieutenant General	Krishna Mohan Seth	30 October 1994	22 October 1995	Regiment of Artillery	
Lieutenant General	S S Grewal	23 October 1995	9 September 1997	Jammu and Kashmir Rifles	
Lieutenant General	Rustom Kaikhusro Nanavatty	10 September 1997	19 June 2000	8th Gorkha Rifles	
Lieutenant General	T S Shergill	20 June 2000	4 October 2001	9th Deccan Horse	
Lieutenant General	V K Jetley	5 October 2001	2 January 2003	Dogra Regiment	
Lieutenant General	Rajinder Singh	3 January 2003	31 December 2003	Regiment of Artillery	
Lieutenant General	Daljeet Singh	1 January 2004	22 September 2005	8th Light Cavalry	
Lieutenant General	Zameer Uddin Shah	September 2005	September 2006	Regiment of Artillery	
Lieutenant General	Manbir Singh Dadwal	September 2006	30 July 2008	Dogra Regiment	
Lieutenant General	Rakesh Kumar Loomba	31 July 2008	August 2009	1st Horse (Skinner's Horse)	
Lieutenant General	Nand Kishore Singh	August 2009	March 2011	3rd Gorkha Rifles	
Lieutenant General	Dalbir Singh Suhag	March 2011	19 June 2012	5th Gorkha Rifles (Frontier Force)	
Lieutenant General	Arun Kumar Sahni	20 June 2012	August 2013	Regiment of Artillery	
Lieutenant General	Srinivasan Lakshmi Narasimhan	August 2013	31 August 2014	Madras Regiment	
Lieutenant General	Bipin Rawat	1 September 2014	22 November 2015	11th Gorkha Rifles	
Lieutenant General	Abhay Krishna	23 November 2015	31 December 2016	Rajputana Rifles	
Lieutenant General	Anil Chauhan	1 January 2017	8 January 2018	11th Gorkha Rifles	
Lieutenant General	Gopal R	9 January 2018	10 January 2019	8th Gorkha Rifles	
Lieutenant General	Rajeev Sirohi	10 January 2019	10 January 2020	The Grenadiers	
Lieutenant General	Rana Pratap Kalita	11 January 2020	10 February 2021	Kumaon Regiment	
Lieutenant General	Johnson P Mathew	10 February 2021	1 March 2022	Punjab Regiment	
Lieutenant General	Ram Chander Tewari	1 March 2022	6 March 2023	Kumaon Regiment	
Lieutenant General	Harjeet Singh Sahi	6 March 2023	10 Aug 2024	Rajput Regiment	
Lieutenant General	Abhijit S. Pendharkar	10 Aug 2024	30 April 2026	Assam Regiment	
Lieutenant General	Girish Kalia	1 May 2026	Incumbent	Madras Regiment	
