= Joginder Singh Bakshi =

Indian general

Lieutenant General Joginder Singh Bakshi MVC, VSM
- Born: 10 March 1928; Lahore, Undivided British India
- Died: 19 August 2014 (aged 86); New Delhi, India
- Military career
- Allegiance: India
- Branch: Indian Army
- Service years: 1950–1986
- Rank: Lieutenant General
- Unit: Jat Regiment
- Commands: III Corps; 25th Infantry Division; 340 (I) Infantry Brigade; Counter-Insurgency and Jungle Warfare School; 16 Jat Regiment
- Conflicts: Bangladesh Liberation War; Indo-Pakistani War of 1971
- Awards: Maha Vir Chakra; Vishisht Seva Medal

Lieutenant General Joginder Singh Bakshi MVC, VSM (10 March 1928 – 19 August 2014) was a General Officer in the Indian Army. He was decorated with the Maha Vir Chakra for his role in the Indo-Pakistani War of 1971.

== Early life ==
Lieutenant General Joginder Singh Bakshi was born in Lahore, Undivided British India, on 10 March 1928, in a military family. He was the fifth generation of his family to join the Army.

== Military career ==
Lieutenant General Joginder Singh Bakshi was commissioned into the Indian Army in the 5 JAT regiment, in June 1950.

His unit was deployed in Nagaland, Manipur and Mizoram from 1963 to 1971 in Counter-insurgency operations, during which time he developed expertise in counter-insurgency and Jungle warfare. For outstanding work in Mizoram in counter-insurgency he was awarded the Vishisht Seva Medal in January 1971.

While posted in the Eastern Command, he was also tasked to train the Mukti Bahini in overt and covert operations in East Pakistan (now Bangladesh).

Thereafter, he raised and commanded the Counter-Insurgency and Jungle Warfare School (CIJWS) at Vairingte, Mizoram. CIJWS is considered one of the premier counter-insurgency training institutions in the world and attracts trainees from friendly countries around the world.

When the Indo-Pakistani War of 1971 started, he held the rank of Brigadier and was commanding the 340 (I) Infantry Brigade in the Eastern sector. His brigade launched a number of attacks on well defended Pakistani positions, resulting in the capture of the city of Bogra. His offensive tactics enabled the capture of a large number of Pakistani troops, arms and equipment, including the commander of the 205 Brigade of the Pakistan Army. For his leadership and aggressive battle planning resulting in large military gains, he was awarded the Maha Vir Chakra.
After the war, he was deputed to Iraq, to help that country setup their War College.

He commanded the 25th Div as a Major General/

Upon his promotion to Lt. General he set up the 3rd Corp in the Eastern sector.

== Post-retirement ==
Upon retirement on 31 March 1986, he chose to live in New Delhi, dedicating his life to help aspiring officers for staff college examinations without charging any fees. He died on 19 July 2014.
