= Anil Chauhan =

Former Chief of Defence Staff of India (born 1961)

General Anil Chauhan PVSM UYSM AVSM SM VSM
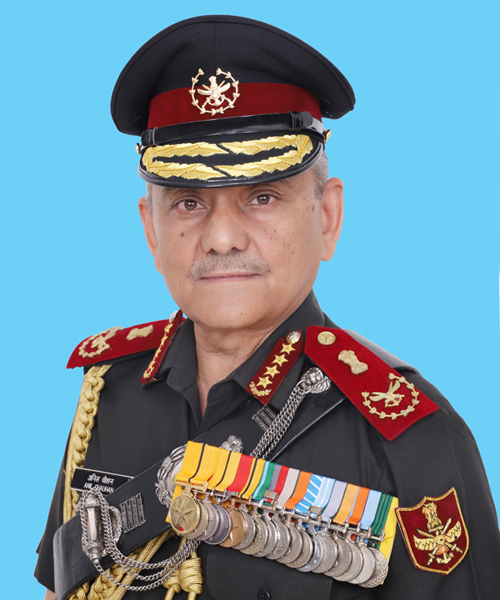
- Official portrait, 2022

2nd Chief of Defence Staff
- In office 30 September 2022 – 30 May 2026
- President: Droupadi Murmu
- Minister of Defence: Rajnath Singh
- Preceded by: Bipin Rawat (2021)
- Succeeded by: N. S. Raja Subramani

58th Chairman of the Chiefs of Staff Committee
- In office 30 September 2022 – 30 May 2026
- President: Droupadi Murmu
- Prime Minister: Narendra Modi
- Minister of Defence: Rajnath Singh
- Preceded by: Manoj Mukund Naravane (acting)
- Succeeded by: N. S. Raja Subramani

General Officer Commanding-in-Chief Eastern Command
- In office 1 September 2019 – 31 May 2021
- Chief of Army Staff: Bipin Rawat; Manoj Mukund Naravane
- Preceded by: Manoj Mukund Naravane
- Succeeded by: Manoj Pande

Personal details
- Born: 18 May 1961 (age 65) Gawana, Srinagar, Uttar Pradesh (present–day Pauri Garhwal, Uttarakhand), India
- Spouse: Anupama Chauhan
- Children: 1

Military service
- Allegiance: India
- Branch/service: Indian Army
- Years of service: 13 June 1981 – 31 May 2021; 30 September 2022 – 30 May 2026 (as CDS)
- Rank: General
- Unit: 11th Gorkha Rifles
- Commands: Eastern Command; III Corps; 19th Infantry Division
- Service number: IC-39492A
- Awards: Param Vishisht Seva Medal; Uttam Yudh Seva Medal; Ati Vishisht Seva Medal; Sena Medal; Vishisht Seva Medal

General Anil Chauhan PVSM UYSM AVSM SM VSM (born 18 May 1961) is a retired four-star general of the Indian Army who served as the 2nd Chief of Defence Staff (CDS) of the Indian Armed Forces.

On 28 September 2022, Gen Chauhan was recalled from retirement and was appointed as Chief of Defence Staff (CDS) by the Government of India, following a June 2022 notification which permitted military retirees under the age of 62 to be qualified for the post. Assuming charge two days later, he became the first three-star retiree to be appointed to the post, traditionally held by a four-star officer. He succeeded General Bipin Rawat, the inaugural holder of the post, who had died in a helicopter crash in December 2021.

== Early life ==
Anil Chauhan is born in a Hindu Rajput family of Chauhan clan on 18 May 1961, hailing from the Gawana village Srinagar Garhwal, Uttarakhand. After completing his schooling at Kendriya Vidyalaya at Fort William, Kolkata, he joined the National Defence Academy, Khadakwasla (NDA) as part of the 58 Course in year. He subsequently joined to the Indian Military Academy, Dehradun (IMA) as part of the 68 Course in 1980. He is also a graduate of the Defence Services Staff College, Wellington, the Higher Command and National Defence College courses.

== Military career ==
Gen Chauhan was commissioned as a second lieutenant into the 6th Battalion of the 11th Gorkha Rifles (6/11 GR) on 13 June 1981 from Indian Military Academy, Dehradun. Chauhans's staff and instructional assignments include Instructional tenure at HQ IMTRAT, Bhutan, Military Observer on a UN Mission to Angola, General Staff Officer 1 (Operations) of the Mountain Division, Director, Perspective & Planning (TAS) at Army HQ, Chief of Staff at HQ 15 Corps and Director General of Discipline Ceremonial & Welfare.

As a Major general, he commanded the Baramulla-based 19th Infantry Division of the Northern Command. In 2017, on promotion to the rank of Lieutenant general, he was appointed General officer commanding (GOC) of the Dimapur-based III Corps. In January 2018, he was appointed Director General Military Operations (DGMO), during the course of which he oversaw the execution of two key military operations: the 2019 Balakot airstrike against Pakistan and Operation Sunrise (2019) - a joint India-Myanmar counterinsurgency offensive.

On 1 September 2019, he took over as the GOC-in-Chief Eastern Command succeeding Lt Gen Manoj Mukund Naravane upon his elevation as the Vice Chief of Army Staff. He superannuated on 31 May 2021 and was succeeded by Lt Gen Manoj Pande. Following his retirement from active military service he served as a military advisor to the National Security Council Secretariat (NSCS), headed by Ajit Doval, India's fifth National Security Advisor.

== Return to military service ==
=== Chief of Defence Staff ===
On 8 December 2021, Gen. Bipin Rawat, the inaugural Chief of Defence Staff (CDS), died when his Mil Mi-17 helicopter carrying him and 13 others, crashed in Coonoor, Tamil Nadu. Gen Rawat, who had only been in the post for twenty-three months, had no immediate successor to him, as the position of CDS had no defined order of succession, which led to it becoming vacant. Amidst growing uncertainty over the impending choice of appointing a successor, the Union Government appointed Gen. Manoj Mukund Naravane, the then-Chief of the Army Staff (COAS), as an acting functionary to the position of Chairman Chiefs of Staff Committee (Chairman COSC), as an interim successor in an effort to temporarily oversee Gen Rawat's responsibilities, while simultaneously looking for a successor. Gen Naravane, then the senior most chief amongst the three branches of the armed forces, was himself reported to be a plausible successor; however, his retirement in April 2022 put an end to those speculations.

In June 2022, the Ministry of Defence (MoD) issued a gazette notification, which stated that any three-star officer under the age of 62 - lieutenant general, vice admiral or air marshal, whether serving or retired, would be considered qualified candidates eligible to appointed as CDS. The notification subsequently made Gen Chauhan, who had already retired as a lieutenant general at the age of 60, one of the key frontrunners in the pool of qualified candidates. Around the time of the notification's release, Gen Chauhan was one of 14 candidates from the army, comprising both serving and retired commanders, who were eligible for the position.

On 28 September 2022, the MoD released an official statement announcing that Gen Chauhan had been selected as the new CDS, which subsequently concluded the position's nine-month vacancy.

On 24 September 2025, Appointments Committee of the Cabinet extended his service tenure as the CDS and ex-officio Secretary, Department of Military Affairs up to 30 May 2026 or until further orders, whichever is earlier, from 30 September.

== Personal life ==
General Chauhan is married to Anupama, an artist. The couple have a daughter, Pragya. An art enthusiast, he is a keen admirer of Tibetan art, a fact which he attributed to his wife. As a general officer and later as CDS, Gen Chauhan's life bore several similarities to Gen Rawat's; both men were commissioned in the same regiment, the 11th Gorkha Rifles and also hailed from the same ancestral region, the Pauri Garhwal district. As fellow officers, Gen Rawat was said to have held Gen Chauhan with high esteem; in 2022, when a military garrison along the Line of Actual Control was renamed after him, Gen Chauhan was amongst the dignitaries present at the renaming ceremony. Chauhan is also said to be close with Ajit Doval, with whom he had closely worked with during his retirement.

Chauhan owns a home in the Vasant Vihar area of Dehradun, where his 94-year-old father stays.

Apart from his service in the military, Gen Chauhan authored two books: Aftermath of A Nuclear Attack - an analytic detailing the effects of a nuclear fallout, which was published in 2010 and History of 11 Gorkha Rifles Regimental Centre, a chronicle of the regiment he wrote during his stint as its commander. According to Chauhan's known acquaintances, he is reputed to be an steady golfer and an ardent collector of masks.

== Honours and decorations ==
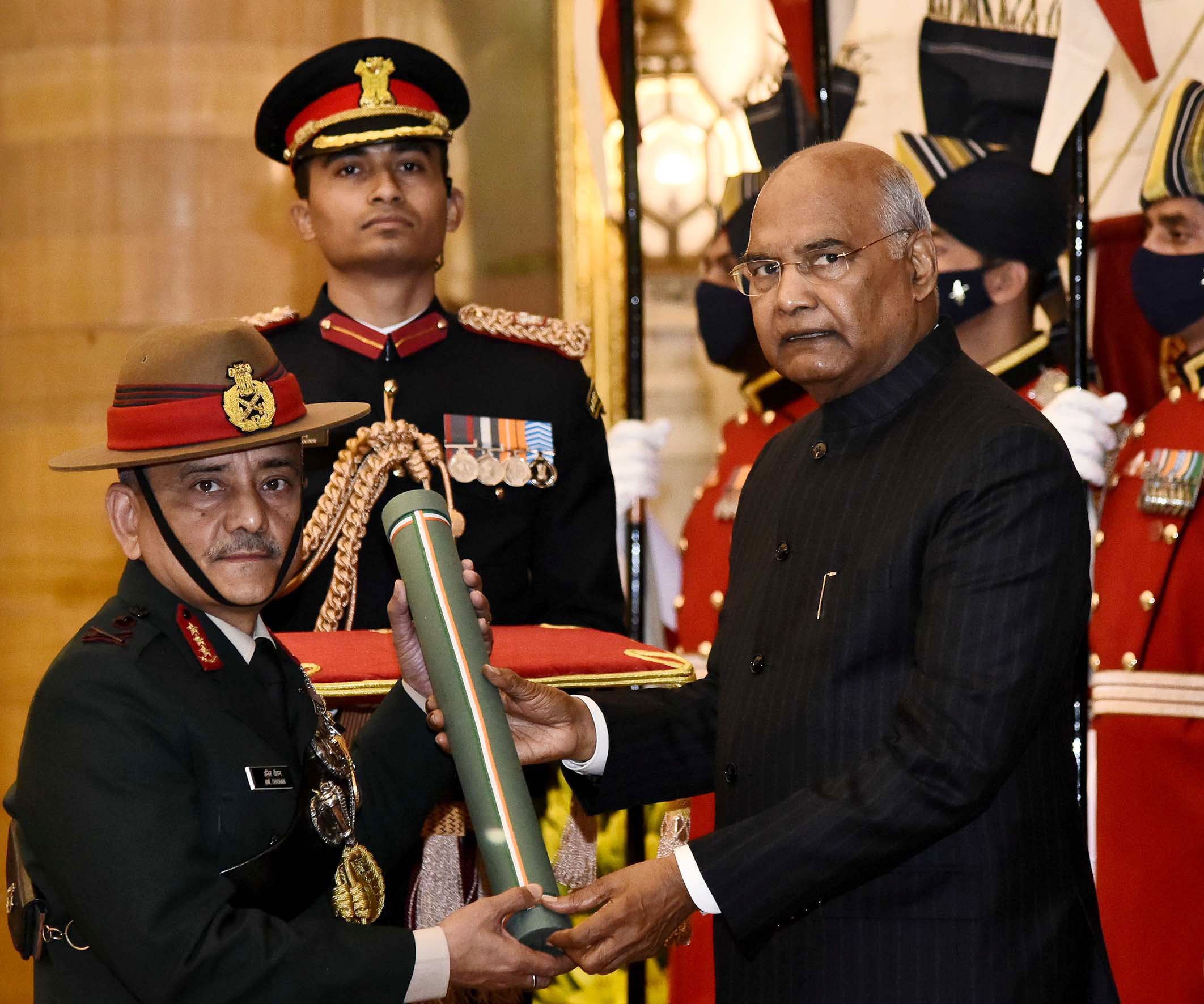
President Kovind presenting the Param Vishisht Seva Medal to Lt. General Anil Chauhan.

Over the span of his military career across four decades, Gen Chauhan received numerous military decorations. He was awarded the Vishisht Seva Medal in 2011, the Sena Medal in 2014, the Ati Vishisht Seva Medal in 2015, the Uttam Yudh Seva Medal in 2018, and the Param Vishisht Seva Medal in 2020.

Param Vishisht Seva Medal		Uttam Yudh Seva Medal	
Ati Vishisht Seva Medal	Sena Medal		Vishisht Seva Medal
Samanya Seva Medal	Special Service Medal	Operation Parakram Medal	Sainya Seva Medal
High Altitude Service Medal	Videsh Seva Medal	75th Anniversary of Independence Medal	50th Anniversary of Independence Medal
30 Years Long Service Medal	20 Years Long Service Medal	9 Years Long Service Medal	MONUA

== Dates of rank ==
Insignia	Rank	Component	Date of rank
	Second Lieutenant	Indian Army	13 June 1981
	Lieutenant	Indian Army	13 June 1983
	Captain	Indian Army	13 June 1986
	Major	Indian Army	13 June 1992
	Lieutenant-Colonel	Indian Army	16 December 2004
	Colonel	Indian Army	1 October 2005
	Brigadier	Indian Army	1 June 2009 (seniority from 8 June 2008)
	Major General	Indian Army	1 January 2014 (seniority from 7 October 2011)
	Lieutenant General	Indian Army	1 July 2016
	General (CDS)	Indian Armed Forces (tri-service)	30 September 2022

Military offices
Preceded by Bipin Rawat	Chief of Defence Staff; 30 September 2022 - 30 May 2026	Succeeded by N. S. Raja Subramani
Preceded by Manoj Mukund Naravane	General Officer Commanding-in-Chief Eastern Command; 31 August 2019 – 31 May 2021	Succeeded by Manoj Pande
Preceded by Anil Kumar Bhatt	Director General of Military Operations; 30 January 2018 – 31 August 2019	Succeeded by Paramjit Singh
Preceded by Abhay Krishna	General Officer Commanding III Corps; 1 January 2017 – 8 January 2018	Succeeded by Gopal R
