= Bengdubi =

- Military Station
- Location in West Bengal, India Bengdubi (India)
- Coordinates: 26.7280°N 88.3061°E
- Country: India
- State: West Bengal
- District: Darjeeling
- Time zone: UTC+5:30 (IST)
- PIN: 734424
- Telephone/STD code: 0353
- Vehicle registration: WB
- Lok Sabha constituency: Darjeeling
- Vidhan Sabha constituency: Matigara-Naxalbari
- Website: darjeeling.gov.in

Bengdubi is a military station in the Naxalbari CD block in the Siliguri subdivision of Darjeeling district in the state of West Bengal, India.

== Geography ==
Places in the south-western portion of Siliguri subdivision in Darjeeling district
CT: census town, R: rural/ urban centre, F: facilities
Owing to space constraints in the small map, the actual locations in a larger map may vary slightly

=== Location ===
Bengdubi is located at 26.7280°N 88.3061°E.

Bengdubi is located in a forested area.

=== Area overview ===
The map alongside shows the Siliguri subdivision of Darjeeling district. This area is spread across the foothills of the Himalayas and is a plain land gently sloping from north to south. While the northern part is mentioned as the Terai region, the larger southern portion forms the western part of the Dooars region. While 55.11% per cent of the population resides in the rural areas, 44.89% resides in the urban areas. On the western side the Mechi River forms a long border with Nepal. On the eastern side the Mahananda River forms a short border with Bangladesh.

Note: The map alongside presents some of the notable locations in the subdivision. All places marked in the map are linked in the larger full screen map.

== Education ==
Army Public School, Bengdubi, is an English-medium coeducational institution established in 1961. It has facilities for teaching from class I to class XII.

Kendriya Vidyalaya, Bengdubi, is a Hindi and English-medium coeducational institution, affiliated with the Central Board of Secondary Education.

== Healthcare ==
One of the Defence Hospitals, the 158 Base Hospital, is located at Bengdubi.

== Leopard menace ==
A leopard was trapped in the Bengdubi tea estate after the forest department took steps to control leopard menace in the tea garden in 2019.
