= Manoj Pande =

29th Chief of the Army Staff (India)

General Manoj Pande PVSM AVSM VSM ADC
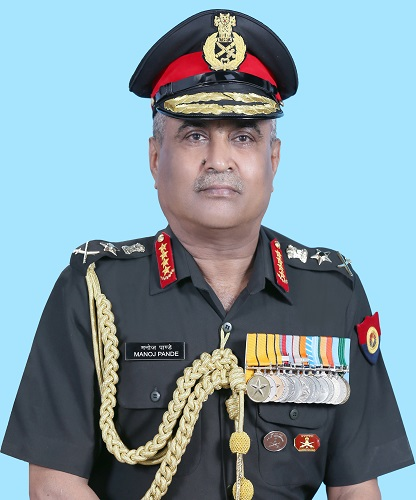
- Official Portrait, 2022

29th Chief of the Army Staff
- In office 30 April 2022 – 30 June 2024
- President: Ram Nath Kovind; Droupadi Murmu
- Preceded by: Manoj Mukund Naravane
- Succeeded by: Upendra Dwivedi

43rd Vice Chief of the Army Staff
- In office 1 February 2022 – 30 April 2022
- Chief of Army Staff: Manoj Mukund Naravane
- Preceded by: Chandi Prasad Mohanty
- Succeeded by: B. S. Raju

General Officer Commanding-in-Chief Eastern Command
- In office 1 June 2021 – 31 January 2022
- Chief of Army Staff: Manoj Mukund Naravane
- Preceded by: Anil Chauhan
- Succeeded by: Rana Pratap Kalita

Commander-in-Chief Andaman and Nicobar Command (CINCAN)
- In office 1 June 2020 – 31 May 2021
- Preceded by: Podali Shankar Rajeshwar
- Succeeded by: Ajai Singh

Personal details
- Born: 6 May 1962 (age 64) Nagpur, Maharashtra, India
- Height: 1.70 m (5 ft 7 in)
- Spouse: Archana Pande

Military service
- Allegiance: India
- Branch/service: Indian Army
- Years of service: 24 December 1982 – 30 June 2024
- Rank: General
- Unit: Bombay Sappers; Corps of Engineers; 267 Engineer Regiment
- Commands: Eastern Command; Andaman and Nicobar Command; IV Corps; 8 Mountain Division; 52 Infantry Brigade; 117 Engineer Regiment
- Service number: IC-40716F
- Awards: Param Vishisht Seva Medal; Ati Vishisht Seva Medal; Vishisht Seva Medal

General Manoj Pande PVSM AVSM VSM ADC (born 6 May 1962) is a retired four star general officer of the Indian Army. He last served as the 29th Chief of the Army Staff. He previously served as 43rd Vice Chief of the Army Staff, prior to that he was General Officer-Commanding-in-Chief Eastern Command and also as the Commander-in-Chief (CINCAN) of Andaman and Nicobar Command. He also served as General Officer Commanding IV Corps, before assuming the appointment as commander of Gajraj Corps (IV Corps) he was serving as the Chief of Staff, Southern Command. He is the first officer from the Corps of Engineers to become the Army Chief.

As the COAS, he took over as the Honorary Colonel of the Sikh Light Infantry Regiment on 11 May 2022 and as the Colonel of the Regiment of the 61st Cavalry on 17 May 2022. He became the 23rd COAS to take over Colonel of the mounted Cavalry Regiment. He was appointed the Honorary Colonel Commandant of the Bombay Sappers for lifetime wef 27 August 2024.

== Early life and education ==
He was born to Dr. C. G. Pande, a consulting Psychotherapist who retired as the Head of the Department of Psychology of Nagpur University, and Prema, an announcer and host with the All India Radio. The family hails from Nagpur. After his schooling from Kendriya Vidyalaya, he joined the 61st-course of the National Defence Academy (NDA) in January 1979 and was assigned to the Lima squadron, where he graduated with the degree of Bachelor of Science. After graduating from the NDA, he joined the Indian Military Academy and was commissioned as an officer. He subsequently attended the College of Military Engineering, Pune and earned a Bachelor of Technology degree in Civil Engineering.

== Career ==
Gen Pande was commissioned into the (267 Engineer Regiment) Bombay Sappers, one of the regiments in the Corps of Engineers, in December 1982. He attended the Staff College, Camberley in the United Kingdom. After completing the course, he returned to India and was appointed brigade major of a mountain brigade in Northeast India. After promotion to the rank of lieutenant colonel, he served as the Chief Engineer at the United Nations Mission in Ethiopia and Eritrea.

He has commanded the 117 Engineer Regiment along the Line of Control (LOC) in Jammu and Kashmir. He was in command of the regiment during Operation Parakram. He then attended the Army War College, Mhow and completed the Higher Command Course. After the course, he was appointed Colonel Q at HQ 8 Mountain Division. The division was then commanded by the Major General Dalbir Singh Suhag. He was then promoted to the rank of brigadier and given command of an engineer brigade as part of a Strike Corps in the western theatre. He also commanded the 52 Infantry Brigade, positioned along the LOC. He was selected to attend the prestigious National Defence College. After completing the course, he was appointed Brigadier General Staff Operations (BGS-Ops) at HQ Eastern Command.

On promotion to the rank of Lieutenant General, he was appointed the Chief of Staff, Southern Command. A year later he was appointed General Officer Commanding IV Corps. On 1 June 2020, Gen Pande assumed the appointment of Commander-in-Chief Andaman and Nicobar Command. On 1 June 2021, he took over as the General Officer-Commanding-in-Chief Eastern Command succeeding Lieutenant General Anil Chauhan.

On 1 February 2022, Lieutenant General Manoj Pande took over as the 43rd Vice Chief of the Army Staff succeeding Lieutenant General Chandi Prasad Mohanty, when the latter superannuated from service on 31 January 2022.

=== Chief of the Army Staff ===
On 18 April 2022, the Government of India appointed Lieutenant General Manoj Pande as the next Chief of the Army Staff. On 30 April 2022, he took over as the 29th Chief of the Army Staff succeeding General Manoj Mukund Naravane. He was granted an extension for a period of one month till 30 June 2024 when he was due to retire on 30 May 2024. While no formal reason was given, it was speculated that the selection of his successor was delayed due to the 2024 general elections in India whose results were to be declared on 4 June. General Upendra Dwivedi was appointed his successor on 11 June 2024 and he took over on 30 June. He superannuated from service on 30 June 2024 and relinquished the appointment of Chief of Army Staff after an illustrious tenure of 26 months.

== Personal life ==
Gen Pande married Mrs. Archana Pande, a gold medalist from Government Dental College and Hospital, Nagpur on 3 May 1987. The couple have a son who is an officer in the Indian Air Force.

== Honours and decorations ==
He is a recipient of the Param Vishisht Seva Medal, Ati Vishisht Seva Medal, and the Vishisht Seva Medal. Apart from these, he has been awarded the Chief of the Army Staff (COAS) Commendation Card and two GOC-in-C commendation cards.

Param Vishisht Seva Medal	Ati Vishisht Seva Medal		Vishisht Seva Medal
Special Service Medal	Operation Vijay Medal	Operation Parakram Medal	Sainya Seva Medal
High Altitude Service Medal	Videsh Seva Medal	75th Independence Anniversary Medal	50th Anniversary of Independence Medal
30 Years Long Service Medal	20 Years Long Service Medal	9 Years Long Service Medal	UNMEE Medal

== Dates of rank ==
Insignia	Rank	Component	Date of rank
	Second Lieutenant	Indian Army	24 December 1982
	Lieutenant	Indian Army	24 December 1984
	Captain	Indian Army	24 December 1987
	Major	Indian Army	24 December 1993
	Lieutenant-Colonel	Indian Army	16 December 2004
	Colonel	Indian Army	1 March 2006
	Brigadier	Indian Army	1 April 2010 (substantive, seniority from 25 January 2009)
	Major General	Indian Army	1 July 2015 (substantive, seniority from 12 June 2012)
	Lieutenant-General	Indian Army	1 September 2017
	General (COAS)	Indian Army	1 May 2022

Military offices
Preceded by Manoj Mukund Naravane	Chief of the Army Staff; 30 April 2022 – 30 June 2024	Succeeded by Upendra Dwivedi
Preceded by Chandi Prasad Mohanty	Vice Chief of the Army Staff; 1 February 2022 – 30 April 2022	Succeeded by B. S. Raju
Preceded by Anil Chauhan	General Officer-Commanding-in-Chief, Eastern Command; 1 June 2021 – 31 January 2022	Succeeded by Rana Pratap Kalita
Preceded by Podali Shankar Rajeshwar	Commander-in-Chief, Andaman and Nicobar Command; 1 June 2020 – 31 May 2021	Succeeded by Ajai Singh
Preceded by Gurpal Singh Sangha	General Officer Commanding IV Corps; December 2018 - December 2019	Succeeded by Shantanu Dayal
