= Panagarh =

- Town
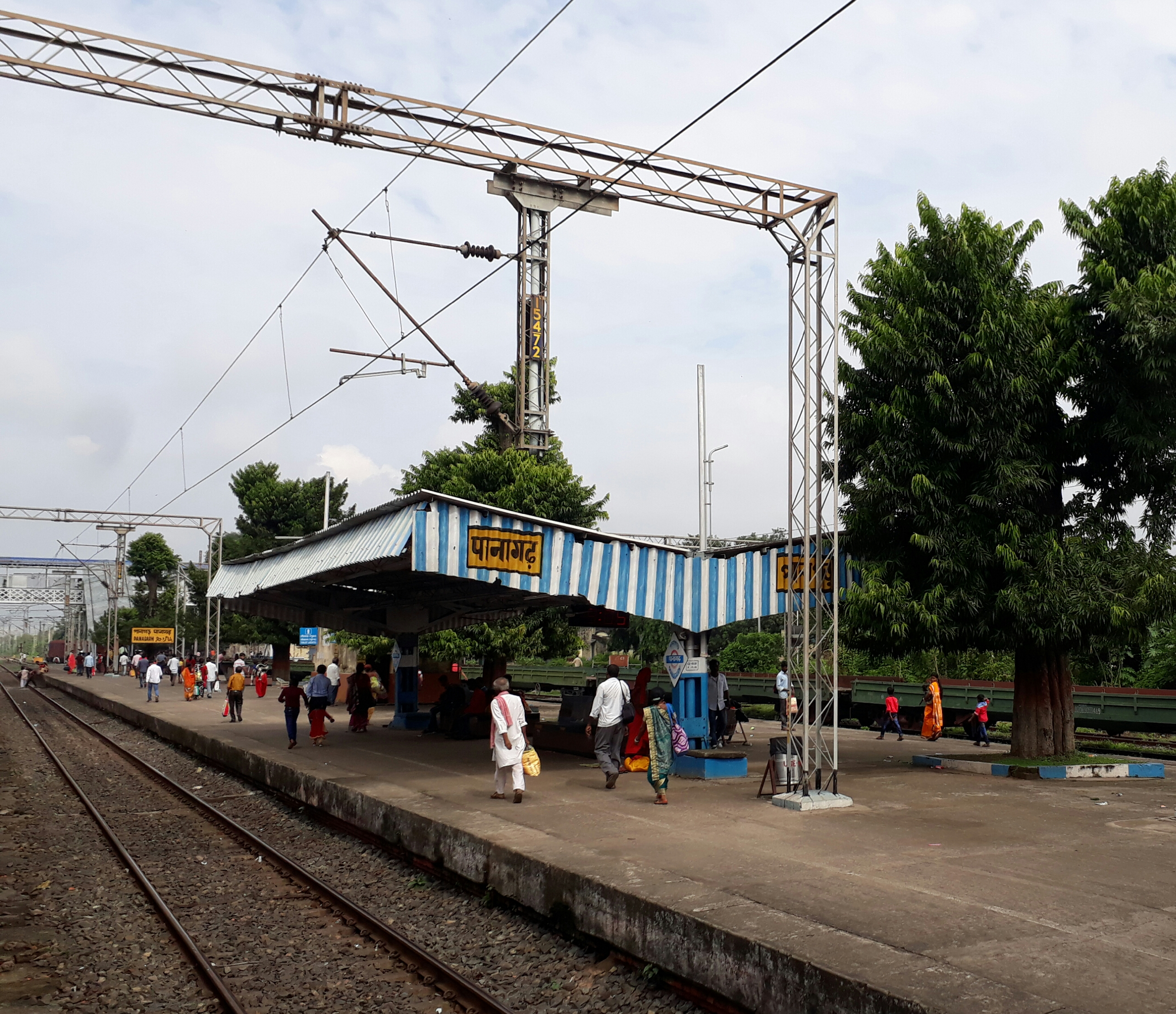
- Panagarh railway station

- Location in West Bengal, India Panagarh (India)
- Coordinates: 23.4484°N 87.4694°E
- City: Durgapur
- State: West Bengal
- Country: India
- Elevation: 58 m (190 ft)

Population (2011)
  - Total: 5,510

Languages
  - Official: Bengali, English
- Time zone: UTC+5:30 (IST)
- Postal code: 713148
- Vehicle registration: WB39, 40
- Lok Sabha constituency: Bardhaman-Durgapur
- Vidhan Sabha constituency: Galsi
- Website: paschimbardhaman.co.in

Panagarh is an industrial neighborhood and an Indian Air Force base in the Durgapur city of the Paschim Bardhaman district in the Indian state of West Bengal.

== Geography ==
Cities and towns in the southern and eastern portions of Durgapur subdivision in Paschim Bardhaman district
MC: Municipal Corporation, CT: census town, R: rural centre, A: airport, B: barrage, H: historical site
Owing to space constraints in the small map, the actual locations in a larger map may vary slightly

=== Location ===
Panagarh is located at 23.45°N 87.43°E. It is 24 km southeast of Durgapur city. It has an average elevation of 58 m (190 ft).

=== Climate ===
Climate data for Panagarh (1971–2000)
| Month | Jan | Feb | Mar | Apr | May | Jun | Jul | Aug | Sep | Oct | Nov | Dec | Year |
|---|---|---|---|---|---|---|---|---|---|---|---|---|---|
| Record high °C (°F) | 32.8 (91.0) | 36.7 (98.1) | 41.4 (106.5) | 46.4 (115.5) | 47.4 (117.3) | 46.2 (115.2) | 40.3 (104.5) | 40.1 (104.2) | 37.6 (99.7) | 38.6 (101.5) | 35.4 (95.7) | 31.7 (89.1) | 47.4 (117.3) |
| Mean maximum °C (°F) | 28.2 (82.8) | 30.7 (87.3) | 38.1 (100.6) | 41.8 (107.2) | 42.9 (109.2) | 40.0 (104.0) | 35.3 (95.5) | 35.2 (95.4) | 35.6 (96.1) | 34.3 (93.7) | 32.5 (90.5) | 29.4 (84.9) | 43.3 (109.9) |
| Mean daily maximum °C (°F) | 26.5 (79.7) | 28.7 (83.7) | 34.0 (93.2) | 37.9 (100.2) | 37.5 (99.5) | 35.3 (95.5) | 32.9 (91.2) | 32.5 (90.5) | 32.6 (90.7) | 31.8 (89.2) | 29.4 (84.9) | 27.1 (80.8) | 32.2 (89.9) |
| Mean daily minimum °C (°F) | 11.3 (52.3) | 13.7 (56.7) | 18.5 (65.3) | 23.2 (73.8) | 24.9 (76.8) | 25.8 (78.4) | 25.5 (77.9) | 25.4 (77.7) | 24.6 (76.3) | 21.6 (70.9) | 17.5 (63.5) | 12.9 (55.2) | 20.4 (68.7) |
| Mean minimum °C (°F) | 8.2 (46.8) | 10.1 (50.2) | 15.8 (60.4) | 20.4 (68.7) | 22.7 (72.9) | 24.3 (75.7) | 24.7 (76.5) | 23.3 (73.9) | 19.5 (67.1) | 16.3 (61.3) | 11.8 (53.2) | 8.7 (47.7) | 8.0 (46.4) |
| Record low °C (°F) | 2.8 (37.0) | 5.4 (41.7) | 9.6 (49.3) | 16.2 (61.2) | 14.6 (58.3) | 21.0 (69.8) | 18.1 (64.6) | 21.6 (70.9) | 14.5 (58.1) | 12.9 (55.2) | 6.6 (43.9) | 3.1 (37.6) | 2.8 (37.0) |
| Average rainfall mm (inches) | 8.2 (0.32) | 21.8 (0.86) | 31.7 (1.25) | 44.2 (1.74) | 112.1 (4.41) | 222.2 (8.75) | 324.1 (12.76) | 275.7 (10.85) | 267.5 (10.53) | 105.7 (4.16) | 10.3 (0.41) | 19.5 (0.77) | 1,443 (56.81) |
| Average relative humidity (%) (at 08:30 IST) | 71 | 61 | 53 | 60 | 68 | 77 | 84 | 85 | 83 | 78 | 72 | 72 | 72 |
Source: India Meteorological Department

=== Urbanisation ===
According to the 2011 census, 79.22% of the population of the Durgapur subdivision was urban and 20.78% was rural. The sole municipal corporation in the Durgapur subdivision is located at Durgapur and the subdivision has 38 (+1 partly) census towns (partly presented in the map alongside; all places marked on the map are linked in the full-screen map).

== Economy ==
Due to its proximity to the Asansol-Durgapur industrial belt, Panagarh has attracted many investments over the years. Emami cements has built a cement grinding plant at Panagarh. Gainwell Engineering, in association with global giant Caterpillar, has a plant at Panagarh for manufacturing coal mining and soft non-ferrous metal mining equipment. H & R Johnson also has a tile manufacturing plant. Dhunseri group has a polyester manufacturing plant in the Panagarh industrial park. Bergers paints has also set up a manufacturing unit at the industrial park. Matrix fertilizer and chemicals has an integrated gas-based Urea plant in Panagarh. Apart from these, many other manufacturing units of Sova Solars, Alcogain distillar, Wacker Metroark Chemicals, etc. are also present at Panagarh.

== Indian Air Force base ==
Panagarh Airport was constructed in 1944, during the Second World War. It serves as a base for the Indian Air Force. In 2016, it was renamed as Air Force Station Arjan Singh.

== Cantonment ==
One of the 62 cantonments in the country is located at Panagarh.

== Demographics ==
According to the 2011 Census of India, Panagar had a total population of 5,510, of which 2,796 (51%) were males and 2,714 (49%) were females. Population in the age range 0–6 years was 650. The total number of literates in Panagar was 3,836 (78.93% of the population over 6 years).

== Transport ==
Panagarh railway station is situated on the Bardhaman–Asansol section, which is a part of Howrah–Gaya–Delhi line, Howrah–Allahabad–Mumbai line and Howrah–Delhi main line.

Earlier, National Highway 19 passed through Panagarh Bazar. A bypass was constructed in 2016, avoiding the crowded bazar area. The old Grand Trunk Road continues to pass through the town.

State Highway 14 passes through Panagarh. The Dubrajpur–Panagarh sector of SH 14 is part of Panagarh–Morgram Highway.

== Education ==
Panagarh has five primary schools, Rama Krishna Ashrama Vidyapitha, the Kendriya Vidyalaya, Secondary School (Panagarh Railway Colony School) and three higher secondary schools (Panagarh Bazar Hindi High School, Kanksa High School and Kanksa Girls' High School).

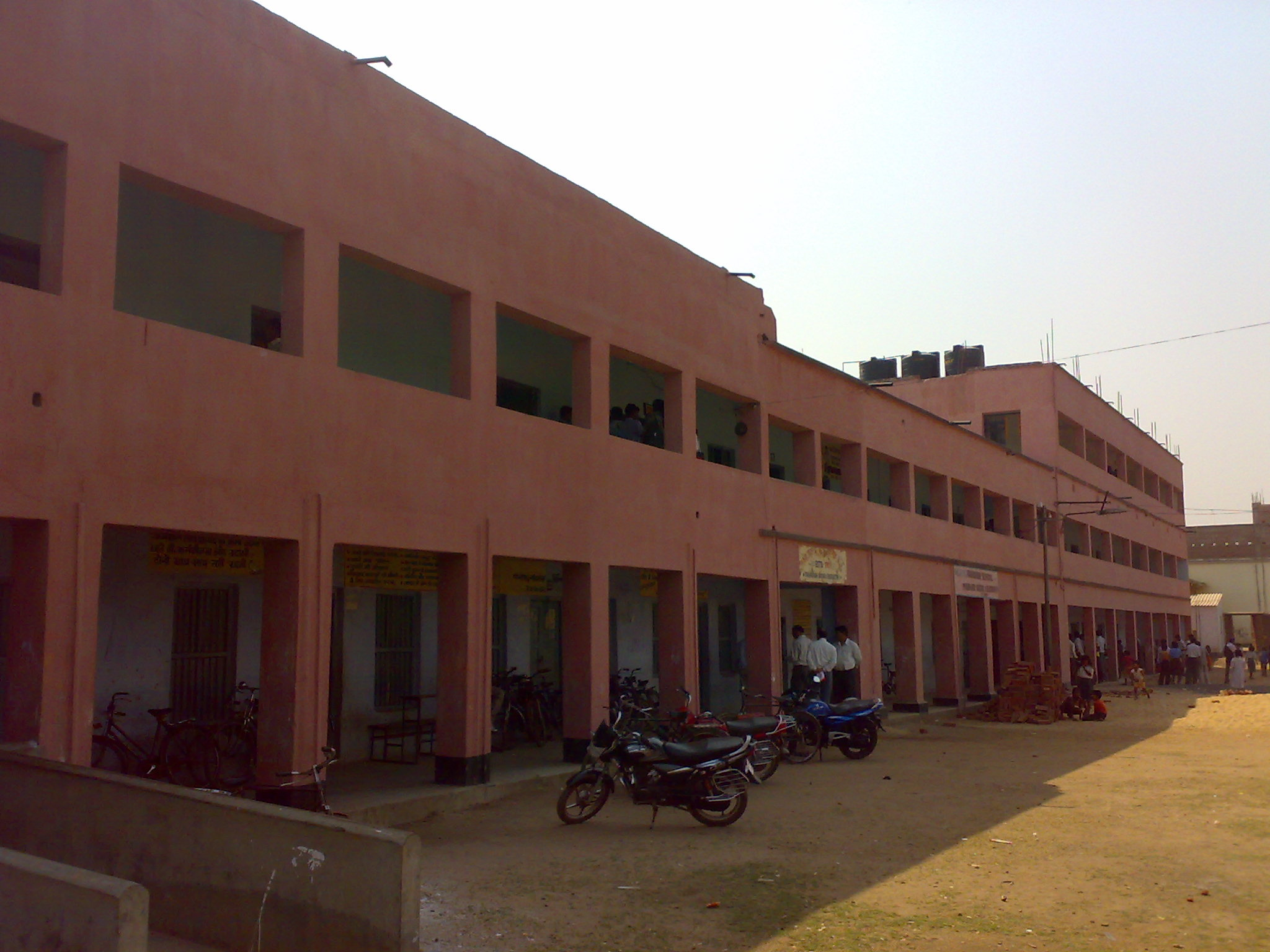
Panagarh Bazar Hindi High School building

=== Professional education ===
Panagarh has two engineering colleges viz. Aryabhatta Institute of Engineering & Management Durgapur and Techno India, Durgapur.

== Healthcare ==
Panagarh Rural Hospital, with 30 beds, is the major government medical facility in the Kanksa CD block. There are 4 nonbedded primary health centres at Malandighi, Shibpur, Shyambazar and Shilampur and 26 health wellness centres.
