= Uttam Yudh Seva Medal =

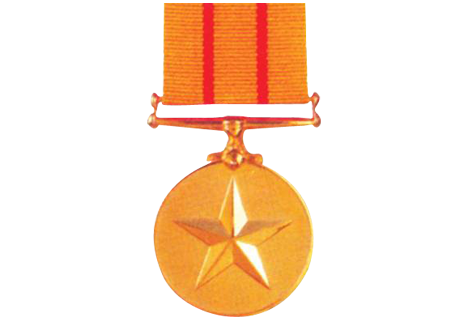
- Medal
- Type: Military medal Service medal
- Awarded for: Wartime distinguished service
- Country: India
- Presented by: Government of India
- Ribbon

Precedence
- Next (higher): Sarvottam Yudh Seva Medal
- Equivalent: Ati Vishisht Seva Medal (Note: Though the Ati Vishisht Seva Medal is placed below the Uttam Yudh Seva Medal in the precedence, it is considered as a peacetime equivalent of Uttam Yudh Seva Medal.)
- Next (lower): Yudh Seva Medal

Uttam Yudh Seva Medal (UYSM; Great War Service Medal) is one of India's military decorations for Wartime Distinguished Service. It is awarded for a high degree of distinguished services in an operational context. "Operational context" includes times of war, conflict, or hostilities. The award is a wartime equivalent of Ati Vishisht Seva Medal, which is a Peacetime Distinguished Service decoration. Uttam Yudh Seva Medal may be awarded posthumously.

== Eligibility ==
The Uttam Yudh Seva Medal may be awarded posthumously. It is awarded for distinguished service of an exceptional order during war/conflict/hostilities. It may be awarded to all ranks of the Army, the Navy and the Air Force including those of Territorial Army Units, Auxiliary and Reserve Forces and other lawfully constituted Armed forces when embodied, as well as nursing Officers and other members of the Nursing Services in the Armed Forces.

== Design ==
The medal is circular in shape, 35mm in diameter and fitted to a plain horizontal bar with standard fittings. The medal is of gold gilt. The medal has on its obverse the State emblem and the inscriptions in Hindi and English. On its reverse, it has a five pointed star. The riband is Gold in colour with two red vertical stripes dividing it into three equal parts.

If a recipient of the medal is subsequently awarded the medal again, every such further award shall be recognized by a Bar to be attached to the riband by which the medal is suspended. For every such Bar, a miniature insignia of a pattern approved by the Government shall be added to the riband when worn alone.
