= Perochak =

Town in Punjab Province, Pakistan

- Town
- Location within Pakistan
- Coordinates: 32°22′40″N 74°30′30″E
- Country: Pakistan
- Province: Punjab
- District: Sialkot District

Population
  - Total: 11,500

Perochak is a town in Sialkot District, Punjab Province, Pakistan. It is located approximately 12 km (7.5 mi) south of the district capital, Sialkot, on the road connecting Motra and Bidyana. This road played an important role in the Indo-Pakistani War of 1965, providing a shortcut to the battlefield during the Battle of Chawinda.

The town has a population of approximately 11,500.

== Education ==
There are two Government Education institutions. Govt. H/S for Boys and Govt. H/S for Girls.
