= Ardeshir Tarapore =

Decorated officer in the Indian Army

Lieutenant Colonel A. B. Tarapore PVC
- Born: 18 August 1923; Bombay, Bombay Presidency, British India (Present-day Mumbai, Maharashtra, India)
- Died: 16 September 1965 (aged 42); Chawinda, Pakistan
- Military career
- Allegiance: Hyderabad State; India
- Branch: Hyderabad Army; Indian Army
- Service years: Hyderabad Army (1940-1951); Indian Army (1951-1965)
- Rank: Lieutenant colonel
- Service number: IC-5565
- Units: Hyderabad Lancers; Poona Horse
- Conflicts: Second World War; Middle Eastern theatre; Indo-Pakistani War of 1947; Annexation of Hyderabad; Indo-Pakistani War of 1965; Battle of Philora; Battle of Chawinda †
- Awards: Param Vir Chakra

Lieutenant Colonel Ardeshir Burzorji Tarapore, PVC (18 August 1923 – 16 September 1965), was an Indian military officer and posthumous recipient of India's highest military award, the Param Vir Chakra. After completing his schooling in Pune, Tarapore joined the Hyderabad Army, and was commissioned in January 1942. Initially he joined the infantry, but was later transferred to an armoured regiment, the 1st Hyderabad Imperial Service Lancers. During World War II, Tarapore saw action in the Middle Eastern theatre of the war.

After Hyderabad State was annexed by India in 1948, Tarapore was selected to join the Indian Army. He was commissioned again in April 1951, and was posted to the Poona Horse regiment, 17th Battalion. Later he attended a training course in the United Kingdom on the Centurion tank. During the Indo-Pakistani War of 1965, 17 Horse saw action in the Sialkot sector. Tarapore led the regiment in several tank battles between 11 and 16 September, and was killed in one such battle at Butur-Dograndi on 16 September. Under his leadership the regiment destroyed sixty Pakistani tanks, while the Indians suffered the loss of nine.

== Early life and education ==
Ardeshir Burzorji Tarapore was born into a Parsi family on 18 August 1923 in Bombay. Ratanjiba, one of Tarapore's ancestors, was a military leader under Chhatrapati Shivaji. The family name "Tarapore" was the namesake of the village of Tarapur, Maharashtra. It was the leading village of those in the charge of Ratanjiba. Later, Tarapore's grandfather relocated to Hyderabad and started working in the Customs and Excise Department of the Nizam of Hyderabad. His father, B. P. Tarapore, was a scholar of Persian and Urdu languages; he worked for the same Customs and Excise Department.

Tarapore joined Sardar Dastur Boys' Boarding School, Pune, at the age of seven. He did not do well at academic subjects, but was a good sportsman. He completed his schooling in 1940, and was the school captain that year. Shortly after he applied for a commission in the Hyderabad Army, and was selected. He completed his initial training at the Officers' Training School (OTS) Golconda and OTS Bangalore. He was commissioned into the 7th Hyderabad Infantry as a second lieutenant on 1 January 1942.

== Military career ==
Popularly known as "Adi", Tarapore was unhappy joining the infantry, as he wanted to join an armoured regiment. When his battalion was being inspected by Major General Syed Ahmed El Edroos, then Commander-in-Chief of the Hyderabad state forces, a live grenade accidentally fell into a bay area during a live-ammunition training exercise. Tarapore quickly picked it up and threw it away. The grenade exploded mid-air inflicting shrapnel wounds to his chest. Major General Edroos witnessed his actions and was impressed. He summoned Tarapore to his office and congratulated him. Tarapore took the opportunity to request a transfer to an armoured regiment. The general agreed and transferred him to the 1st Hyderabad Imperial Service Lancers. During the Second World War, Tarapore and his unit saw action and served in the war's Middle Eastern theatre.

As a result of Operation Polo in 1948, Hyderabad merged with the Union of India, and its forces were eventually amalgamated into the Indian Army. Tarapore was selected for the Indian Army and was commissioned as a captain on 1 April 1951. (Note: Though Tarapore was a major with the Hyderabad State Army, he was commissioned as a captain in the Indian Army, to overcome the challenges of transition and assimilate himself.) He was first posted on probation for two years to 'B' Squadron of the Poona Horse regiment, 17th Battalion, and later transferred to 'A' Squadron as its second-in-command. India acquired Centurion tanks in the early 1960s and Tarapore was one of the officers selected to attend a training course in the United Kingdom. He was promoted to major on 1 January 1958, and to lieutenant-colonel on 10 June 1965.

=== Battle of Chawinda ===
Beginning in April 1965, India and Pakistan engaged in a series of skirmishes across the Line of Control (LOC). In August, Pakistan attempted mass infiltration into Kashmir in Operation Gibraltar. On 5 August, Pakistani soldiers crossed the LOC dressed as Kashmiri locals, heading for various areas within Kashmir. After locals reported the presence of Pakistani troops, the Indian Army captured several disguised Pakistani soldiers and foiled the infiltration operation. On 1 September, Pakistan launched a counterattack, named Operation Grand Slam, to capture vital points that would cut off supply routes to Indian troops. This plan eventually was foiled by the Indian troops. Later on 6 September, Indian forces crossed the Radcliffe Line, marking the official beginning of the Indo-Pakistani War of 1965.

Indian I Corps was given the responsibility of capturing the Sialkot sector. Poona Horse was part of the 1st Armoured Division, attached to I Corps. It was tasked to isolate Sialkot from Lahore. On 11 September 1965 Poona Horse launched an attack on Phillora. To surprise the Pakistanis, it was decided to attack Phillora from the rear. As part of the regiment, commanded by Lieutenant Colonel Tarapore, was attacking Phillora from Chawinda, it encountered Pakistani armour advancing from Wazirwali. Tarapore held his ground and attacked Phillora under enemy tank and artillery fire. When wounded he refused to be evacuated. His regiment successfully captured Wazirwali on 14 September. On the 16th they advanced to capture Jassoran, supported by 9 Dogra, and Butur-Dograndi, supported by 8 Garhwal. In the latter battle his tank was hit several times. Tarapore was mortally wounded, and succumbed to his injuries. Under his leadership the regiment had destroyed sixty Pakistani tanks, while the Indians had suffered the loss of nine. According to one account, Pakistani tanks held their fire during his cremation.

=== Param Vir Chakra ===
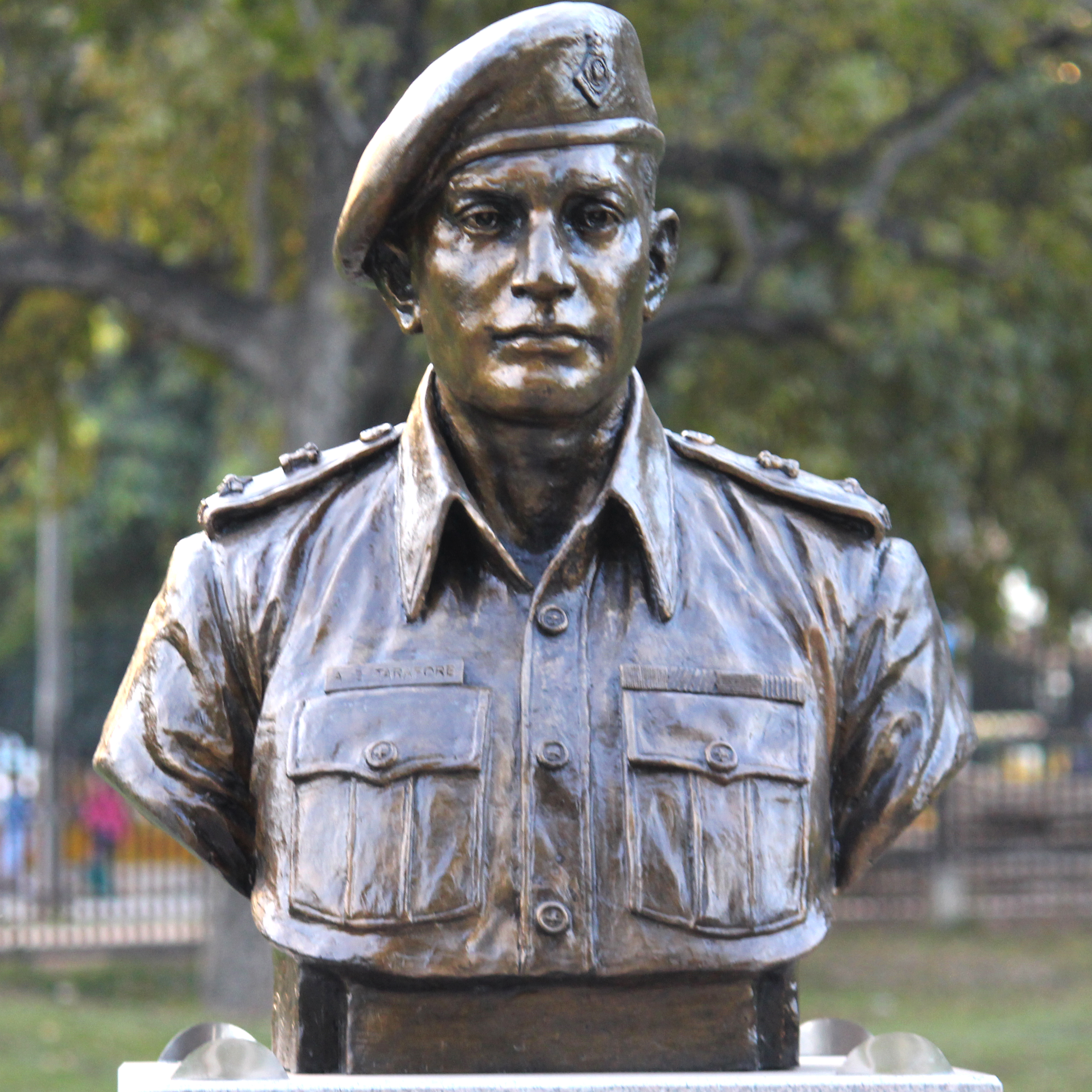
Tarapore's statue at Param Yodha Sthal, National War Memorial, New Delhi

Tarapore was posthumously awarded the Param Vir Chakra, for leading the regiment while injured, and inflicting significant tank losses on the Pakistani side, with an effective date of award of 11 September 1965. The official citation reads:

On 11 September 1965, the Poona Horse regiment under the command of Lieutenant Colonel Ardeshir Burzarji Tarapore was assigned the task of delivering the main armored thrust for capturing Phillora in the Sialkot Sector in Pakistan. As a preliminary to making a surprise attack on Phillora from the rear, the regiment was thrusting between Phillora and Chawinda when it was suddenly counterattacked by the enemy’s heavy Armour from Wazirali. Lieutenant Colonel A. B. Tarapore who was then at the head of his regiment, defied the enemy’s charge, held his ground and gallantly attacked Philloira with one of his squadrons supported by an infantry battalion. Though under continuous enemy tank and artillery fire, Lieutenant Colonel A. B. Tarapore remained unperturbed throughout this action and when wounded refused to be evacuated. Inspired by his leadership, the regiment fiercely attacked the enemy heavy armour destroying approximately 60 enemy tanks at a cost of only 9 tank casualties, and when Lieutenant Colonel A. B Tarapore was mortally wounded the regiment continue to defy the enemy. The valour displayed by Lieutenant Colonel A.B. Tarapore in this heroic action, which lasted six days, was in keeping with the highest traditions of the Indian Army.

— The Gazette of India Notification No. 112—Press/65

His wife received the award on Tarapore's behalf from the President of India. Later, as her own health deteriorated, it was handed over to the regiment and preserved in its quarter guard.

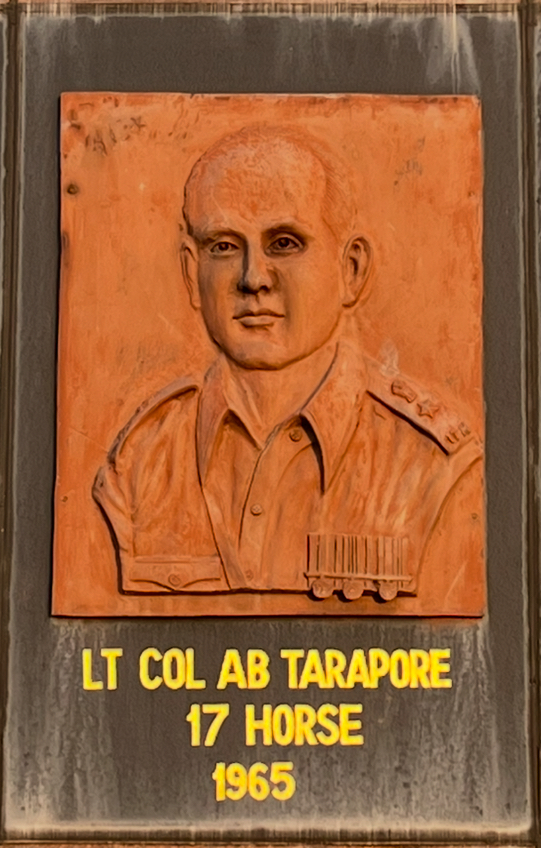
Relief Mural at Balidan Stambh, Jammu

Balidan Stambh, the war memorial in Jammu in 2009 paid tribute to him by inscribing his name on the pillars erected in semi circumference for the martyrs of the 1965 war. His name is displayed near the eternal flame and as relief mural on the semi circumference wall with the Param Vir Chakra awardees who attained martyrdom in Jammu and Kashmir.

== In popular culture ==
- The eleventh episode on DD National of Param Vir Chakra TV series reprised his character in 1988.
- A graphic novel titled Param Vir Chakra by Amar Chitra Katha dedicated their eleventh story written by Aparna Kapur and drawn by Dilip Kadam in 2015

== Notes ==
Footnotes

Citations
