= Gadgor =

Coordinates: 32°24′N 74°46′E

Gadgor is a small town in Pasrur Tehsil, Sialkot District, Pakistan. Towns near Gadgor include Behrampur, Jahar, Joshan, Chobara, Chak Meer Da, Gillan Wala, Chawinda, Kotli Mughlan and Philoura. Its geographical coordinates are 32° 24' 0" North, 74° 46' 0" East. Gadgor is in the centre of the Chawinda and Kingrah sectors.

Gadgor was a well-established village before the Indo-Pakistan partition in 1947. Before August 1965, the Pakistani army shifted residents of the area to other places to protect them from the advancing Indian army, which had crossed into Pakistani territory. The 1965 war witnessed some of the largest tank battles since World War II. India's attack at the Battle of Chawinda, led by its 1st Armoured Division and supporting units, was brought to a halt by the 6th Armoured Division (ex-100th independent brigade group) in the Chawinda sector. India lost 180 tanks at Chawinda. Gadgor village still has monuments to the 1965 war.

In Sialkot, outnumbered Pattons (Pakistani Army tanks) performed well in the hands of the 25th Cavalry and other regiments of the 6th Armoured Division.

== Demography ==
Gadgor is a multi-caste village composed mostly of RajputSulehri, Sayed, Gujjar, Jaffari, Bajwa clan and Hashmi members. Historically, the people of Gadgor relied on agriculture and labor for employment. Over the years, emigration to the Gulf States has become a trend; many have moved to Saudi Arabia.

Girls' education is encouraged. Cricket, volleyball, kabaddi, and football are the most popular sports in Gadgor.
