= Battle of Phillora =

Battle of the Indo-Pakistani War of 1965

- Part of Indo-Pakistani war of 1965
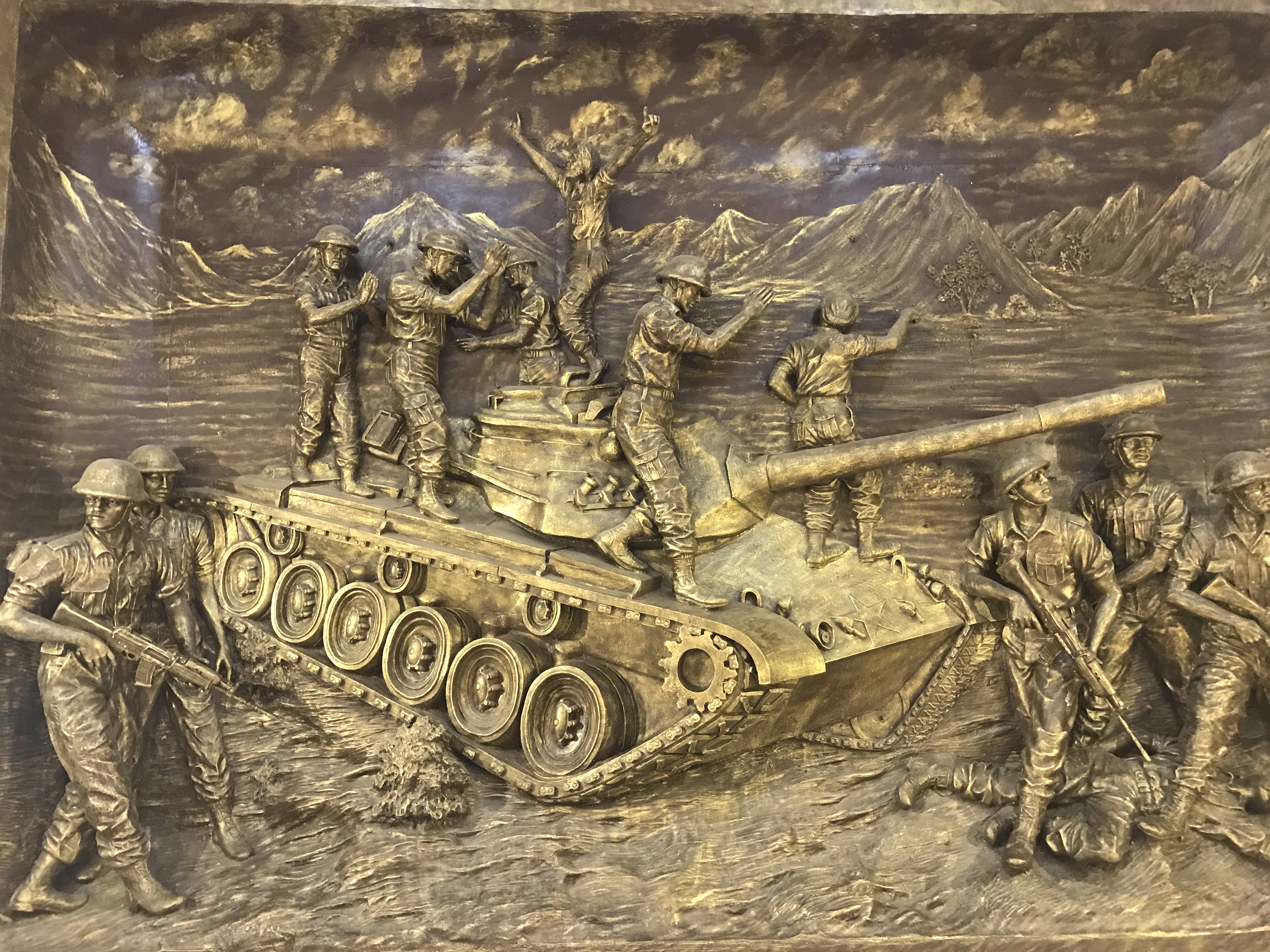
- Sculpture showing the Indo-Pakistani War Phillora and surroundings
Date	7–11 September 1965 (4 days)
Location	Phillora in Sialkot (Punjab, Pakistan) 32.3810°N 74.7197°E
Result	Indian victory
Territorial changes	India captures 470 km^{2} (180 sq mi) of Pakistani territory

Belligerents
India	Pakistan

Commanders and leaders
(India) Lt. Gen. Harbakhsh Singh; (India) Lt. Gen. Pat Dunn; (India) Maj. Gen. Rajinder Singh; (India) Lt. Col. Ardeshir Tarapore	(Pakistan) Lt. Gen. Bakhtiar Rana; (Pakistan) Maj. Gen. Abrar Hussain (Note: "[Abrar Hussain] had fought in the World War II and won the MBE due to his bravery as a young army lieutenant. Later in the 1965 War, he was awarded the gallantry award, Hilal-i-Jurat, for leading an infantry brigade as part of the 6th Armoured Division that fought the famous tank battle with the Indian Army at Chawinda in Sialkot and halted the advance of the invading Indian troops in Pakistan’s territory.")

Units involved
1st Armoured Division: 1st Armoured Brigade; 16th Cavalry Regiment; 17th Horse Regiment; 4th Horse Regiment; 62nd Cavalry Regiment; 43rd Lorried Brigade	6th Armoured Division: 10th Cavalry Regiment; 11th Cavalry Regiment; 33rd TDU; 4th Frontier Force; 14th Para Brigade

Casualties and losses
6 tanks	67 tanks (mostly Pattons) destroyed/damaged

The Battle of Phillora was a large tank battle fought during the Indo-Pakistani War of 1965. It commenced on 10 September when the Indian 1st Armoured Division, with four armoured regiments and supporting forces under command, attacked positions in the Sialkot sector held by Pakistani 6th Armoured Division. After three days the Pakistanis withdrew with the loss of 67 tanks. The Indian losses were 6 Centurions.

The battle coincided with the Battle of Asal Uttar where the Indians were again successful. It was followed by the Battle of Chawinda, where the Indian offensive was halted. On 22 September a ceasefire came into force.

== Battle ==
The battle commenced on 10 September 1965 when Indian troops launched a massive attack in the Phillora sector headed by Indian 1st Armoured Division. Equipped with four armoured regiments, and with a motorised infantry brigade attached, the division faced stiff opposition from the Pakistani 6th Armoured Division. Pakistani aircraft attacked the Indian forces. Their tanks suffered little damage while the supporting transport and infantry columns were harder hit. Over the next two days there was intense fighting before the outnumbered Pakistani troops made a tactical retreat towards Chawinda. At this point India claimed to have destroyed 66 Pakistani tanks but Pakistan admitted the loss of 22 tanks.

According to ex-Pakistan Army Major and military historian A.H. Amin the Pakistani armour failed at the battle of Phillora:

6 Armoured Division ordered Guides (10th) Cavalry and 14 FF to mount an attack from Bhagowal-Bhureshah area against the right flank of the Indians aimed at area Libbe-Chahr at 1130 hours on 11th September. The aim of this attack was to relieve pressure on 11th Cavalry. The Guides had a severe firefight with 16th Light Cavalry losing many tanks as well as destroying some enemy tanks but were unable to make any impression and the main Indian attack against 11th Cavalry holding Phillora proceeded smoothly. Phillora was captured by the Indians on 1530 hours on 11th September. The 11th Cavalry fought well and lost so many tanks that from 11th September onwards it ceased to function as a complete tank regiment.

Major Amin also criticised India for its strategic miscalculation:

The Indians fought well but in the overall strategic context the capture of Phillora was of little consequence. Had the Indians shown similar resolution and a little more coup d'œil and modified their plans at the brigade and divisional level on 8 September, by 11 September they would have been leisurely holding the east bank of the MRL (Marala–Ravi link canal).

== Result ==
On 12 September the battle ended in a decisive victory for the Indian Army with the Pakistani forces retreating and regrouping to put up a last stand at Chawinda A day before, the Indian Army had experienced another victory at Asal Uttar when they successfully thwarted a Pakistani offensive in the Khem Karan sector. The continued thrust by the Indian Army into Pakistani territory finally culminated in the Battle of Chawinda, where the Indian army's advance was halted. On 22 September the United Nations Security Council passed a resolution that called for an unconditional ceasefire from both nations. The same day a ceasefire agreement was signed and hostilities ceased. The war ended the following day. India still retained almost 200 square miles (500 square kilometres) of Pakistani territory in the Sialkot sector including the villages of Phillora, Pagowal, Maharajke, Gadgor and Bajagrahi. They were returned to Pakistan after the Tashkent Declaration.

== See also ==
- Indo-Pakistan Wars
- Operation Grand Slam
