= Siri Kanth Korla =

Indian Army Major General (1917–2007)

Major General Siri Kanth Korla PVSM, DSO, MC
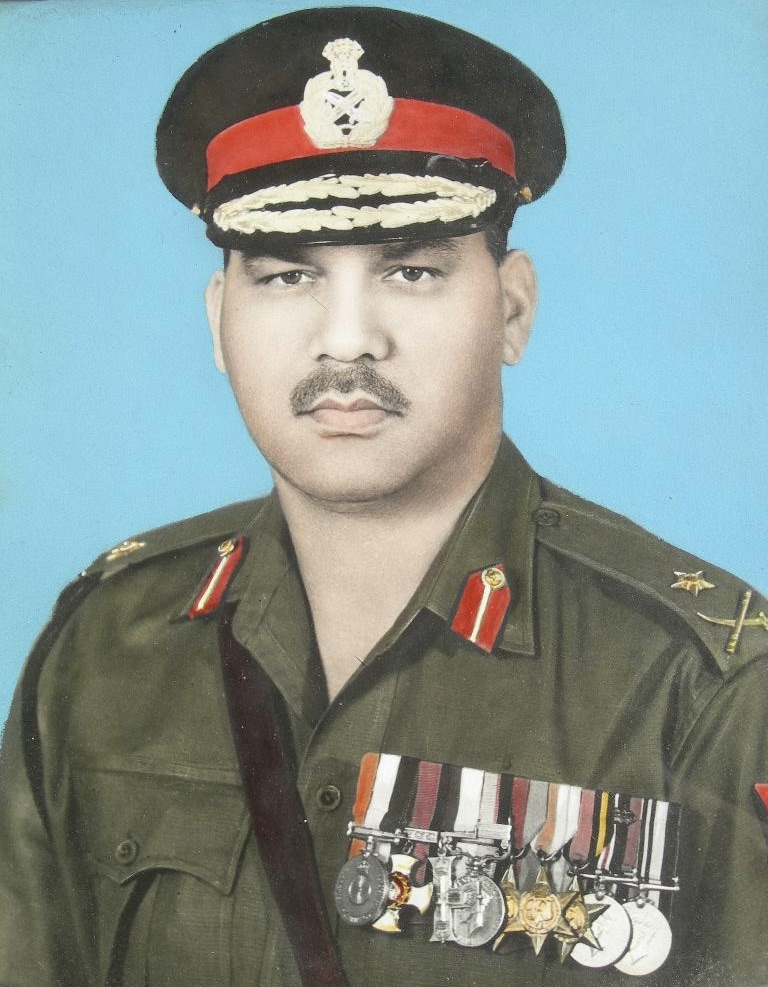
- Born: 27 January 1917; Sihund, Kangra district, Punjab Province, British India
- Died: 7 April 2007 (aged 90); Palampur, Kangra district, Himachal Pradesh, India
- Alma mater: King George's Royal Indian Military School; Indian Military Academy; School of Infantry, Warminster; National Defence College, New Delhi
- Spouse: Sarla Korla
- Military career
- Allegiance: British India; India
- Branch: British Indian Army; Indian Army
- Service years: 1937–1971
- Rank: Major General
- Service number: IC382
- Units: 7/10 Baluch; 1st Gorkha Rifles (The Malaun Regiment)
- Commands: Dogra Brahmin Company, 7/10 Baluch; 1st Gorkha Rifles (The Malaun Regiment); 6th Mountain Division; Delhi Area
- Conflicts: Waziristan Campaign; World War II; Burma campaign; Battle of Pa-an; Battle of Meiktila; Indo-Pakistan War of 1965; Battle of Chawinda
- Awards: Param Vishisht Seva Medal; Distinguished Service Order; Military Cross; Mentioned in Dispatches (2); Colonel of the Regiment, 1st Gorkha Rifles
- Other work: Director General, Home Guards

Major General Siri Kanth Korla, PVSM, DSO, MC (also spelled Sri Kanth Korla) (27 January 1917 – 7 April 2007) was a general officer in the Indian army who served in the Second World War and the Indo-Pakistan War of 1965. He served in the British Indian Army from 1934 to 1947, and the Indian Army from 1947 to 1971. Korla was known as one of the great company commanders of the Burma Campaign, and among the most highly and heavily decorated Indian officers of the British Indian Army during the Second World War.

== Personal life ==
Korla came from a Dogra background and hailed from the Kangra Valley, India. He did his schooling from the King George's Royal Indian Military School, Jullunder.

He was married to Sarla Korla. They got married while he was on a break from serving in Burma, around the time of the Battle of Imphal (summer of 1944). Upon his death in April 2007, Korla was cremated with full military honours.

== Military career ==
Korla joined the 10th Baluch Regiment in 1934, as a sepoy, and in a few years was promoted to havildar. He participated in the Waziristan operations of 1936. He then joined the Indian Military Academy in 1939, and received his commission in 1940.

=== World War II ===
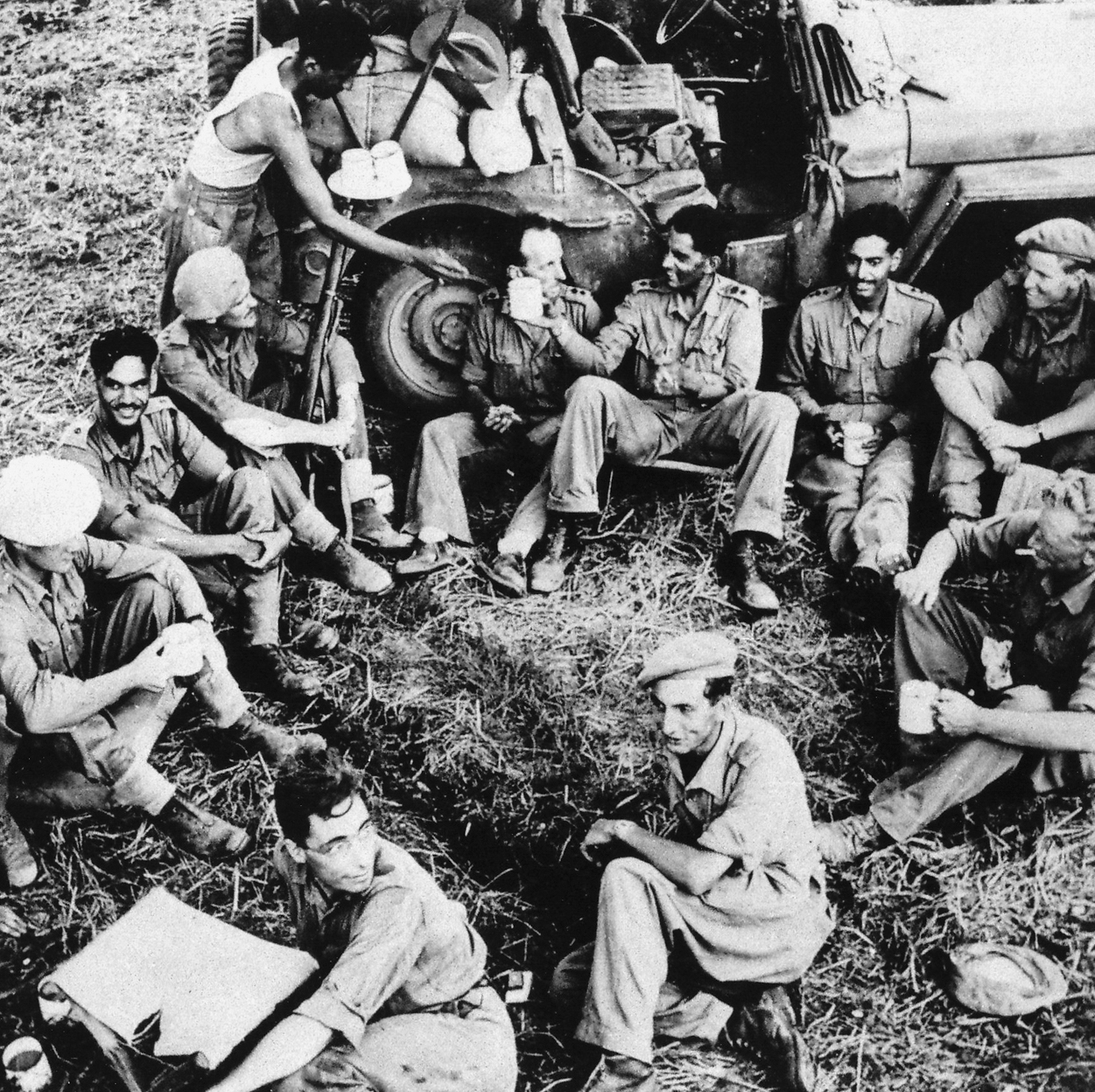
Officers of 7/10th Baluch after the fall of Pegu, Burma, 1945. Major Korla is seen sitting second to the left, next to the man with the rifle.

As a young officer of the 7/10th Baluch Regiment (17th Infantry Division) of the British Indian Army, Korla saw major action against the forces of the Imperial Japanese Army in various episodes of action across Burma.

For his leadership and personal valour in the Battle of Pa-an in February 1942, Lt. (acting Captain) Korla was awarded an immediate Distinguished Service Order (DSO), then the second highest wartime gallantry award of the British and Commonwealth forces. Lt. (acting Captain) Korla's DSO was announced alongside a Mention in Dispatches in The London Gazette on 23 April 1942.

Another Mention in Dispatches for Lt. (acting Captain) Korla was announced in The London Gazette on 28 October 1942, for escorting a mule convoy without any losses for 57 miles, from Zigon to Prome in Burma, under hot pursuit from the Japanese.

For his leadership and initiative at Taungtha in the Battle of Meiktila in early 1945, Major (temporary) Korla was awarded the Military Cross (MC) - the third highest wartime gallantry award of the British and Commonwealth forces. Korla's MC was announced in The London Gazette on 24 May 1945. He was also active in the main battle for Meiktila.

=== Post-Independence ===
After the Independence of India in 1947, Korla - then a lieutenant colonel - was given charge of the 2nd battalion, 1st Gorkha Rifles (The Malaun Regiment) (2/1 Gorkha Rifles) of the Indian Army.

Over 1951-52, Korla was on attachment to the School of Infantry at Warminster, United Kingdom, for a year. From 1958 to 1959, in the rank of colonel, he served as the Deputy Commandant of the Indian Military Academy. Then as a brigadier, he commanded a brigade in Kashmir. From 26 September 1961 till 6 June 1963, Korla served as the Commandant of the Infantry School at Mhow, also in the rank of brigadier. On 16 June 1963, he was appointed Brigadier General Staff of a Corps. He was then selected for a National Defence College course, following which he was promoted to become the commander of a division. In May 1965, he was appointed as the ceremonial 'Colonel of the Regiment' of the 1st Gorkha Rifles.

In the Indo-Pakistan War of 1965, as a major general, Korla commanded the 6th Mountain Division, part of the I Corps. The division saw action in the Battle of Chawinda.

From 28 February 1968 to 19 January 1971, Maj Gen Korla served as the General Officer Commanding (GOC) of the Delhi Area, and retired from the army at this post in 1971. He commanded the Republic Day parade in New Delhi on 26 January 1970. On 26 January 1971, he was awarded the Param Vishisht Seva Medal (PVSM) by the then President of India, V. V. Giri.

== Awards and decorations ==

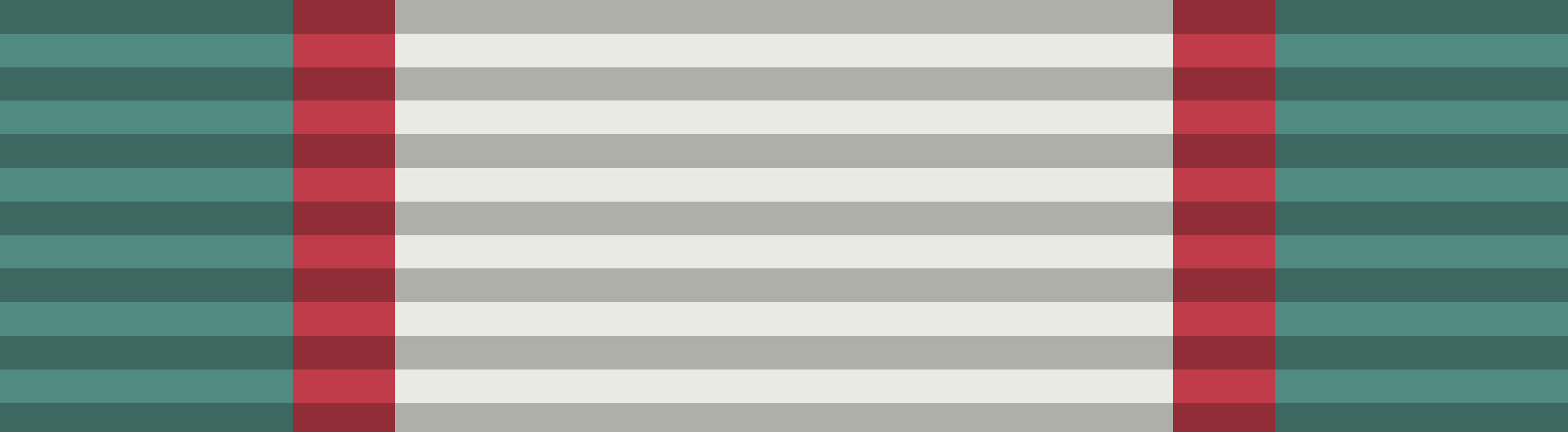

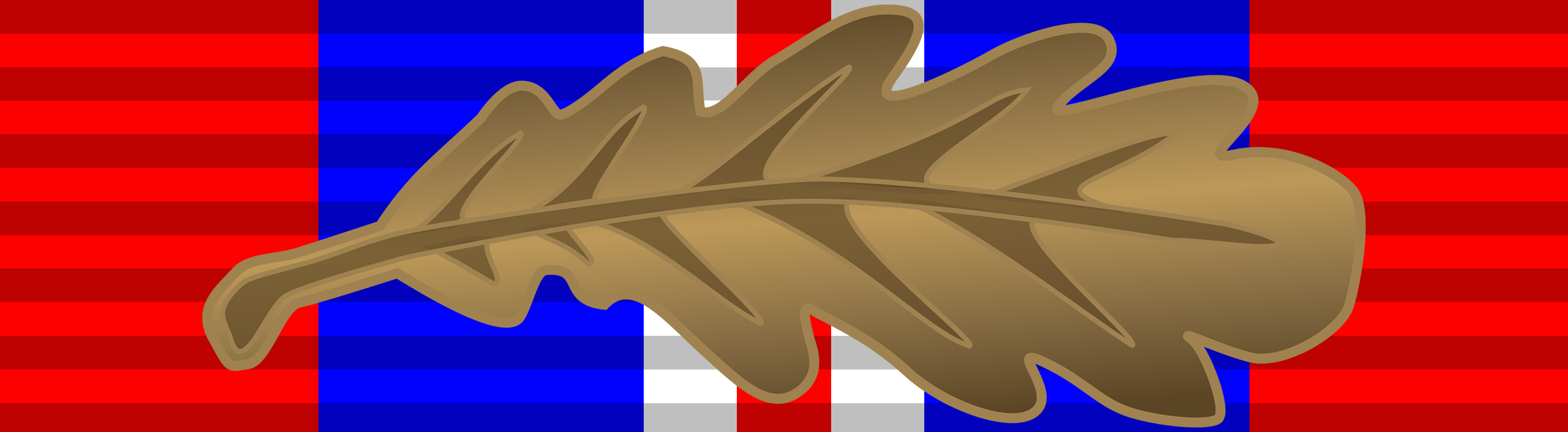

| Param Vishisht Seva Medal | Samar Seva Star | | India Independence Medal |
| Distinguished Service Order | Military Cross | India General Service Medal (1936) | 1939–45 Star |
| Africa Star | Burma Star | War Medal 1939–1945 with a bronze oak leaf (Mention in Dispatches) | India Service Medal |

== Post-retirement ==
After retiring from the army, from 1972 to 1976, Korla served as the Director General of the Home Guards in Delhi. In May 1975, he relinquished his post as the ceremonial Colonel of the 1st Gorkha Rifles.

In the early 1980s, Korla served as a member of the Himachal Pradesh Board of School Education.
