= Patrick Dunn (general) =

Indian military personnel

Lieutenant-General Patrick Oswald Dunn
- Born: 29 May 1911
- Died: 16 September 1977 (aged 66)
- Military career
- Allegiance: British India (1938–1947); India (1947–1967)
- Branch: British Indian Army; Indian Army
- Service years: 1938–1967
- Rank: Lieutenant-General
- Service number: IC-193
- Units: 10th Baluch Regiment; 3rd Gorkha Rifles
- Conflicts: World War II; Annexation of Goa, 1961; Indo-Pakistani War of 1965
- Awards: Padma Bhushan; Mention in Dispatches; Colonel of the Regiment, 3rd Gorkha Rifles

Lieutenant-General Patrick Oswald Dunn (29 May 1911 – 16 September 1977) was an Indian Army general. He commanded the I Corps during the Indo-Pak War of 1965 for which he was awarded the third-highest award of India - the Padma Bhushan.

== Personal life ==
An Anglo-Indian, Dunn took a law degree from Cambridge University. He was married to Bonny, who died in the early 1970s.

== Career ==
=== Pre-Independence ===
He was commissioned in the British Indian Army on 15 July 1938 from the Indian Military Academy, Dehradun. As was customary, on 10 August 1938 he was attached to a battalion of a regular British Army regiment, the 2nd Worcestershire Regiment, for a period of one year prior to his official appointment to the Indian Army.

He served in 7/10 Baluch during the Burma Campaign. He was mentioned in dispatches during his time in Burma.

Dunn attended Staff College, Camberley in 1945, and commanded a Gorkha battalion from November 1946.

=== Post Independence ===
As 10 Baluch was allocated to the Pakistan Army following Indian independence and Partition, he transferred to the 3rd Gorkha Rifles, and became officiating commander of an infantry brigade in January 1949.

On 20 August 1955, Dunn, now an acting colonel, was given command of an infantry brigade. He was appointed Commandant of the Infantry School on 16 September 1959.

=== General officer ===
In September 1961, he was promoted to the acting rank of major general and appointed Chief of Staff, Southern Command, with Lt Gen Jayanto Nath Chaudhari, OBE, as GOC of the Command. In this capacity, he was involved in the Indian Army's annexation of Goa, in December that year.

Over the 1960s, he served as the Colonel of the Regiment for the 3rd Gorkha Rifles. He succeeded Maj Gen Yadunath Singh, and was himself succeeded by Lt Gen Sagat Singh.

On 17 December 1962, he was given command of an infantry division. In January 1964, he was appointed Deputy Chief of General Staff (DCGS), serving for one year until the post was abolished on 15 January 1965. He was then appointed Director of Staff Duties (DSD) from that date until April 1965, when he commanded troops in the Rann of Kutch following Pakistan's Operation Desert Hawk.

At the end of May, Dunn was appointed GOC of the newly raised I Corps, which he commanded during the conflict between India and Pakistan that August. He was awarded the Padma Bhushan for his service, and voluntarily retired from the Army on 19 May 1967, after nearly 29 years of service.

== Dates of rank ==
Insignia	Rank	Component	Date of rank
	Second Lieutenant	British Indian Army	15 July 1938
	Lieutenant	British Indian Army	29 November 1939
	Captain	British Indian Army	10 October 1940 (acting); 10 January 1941 (temporary); 16 March 1942 (war-substantive); 29 August 1945 (substantive)
	Major	British Indian Army	10 January 1941 (acting); 16 March–12 May 1942 (temporary)
	Lieutenant-Colonel	British Indian Army	12 February 1942 (acting); 12 May 1942 (temporary)
	Captain	Indian Army	15 August 1947 (Note: Upon independence in 1947, India became a Dominion within the British Commonwealth of Nations. As a result, the rank insignia of the British Army, incorporating the Tudor Crown and four-pointed Bath Star ("pip"), was retained, as George VI remained Commander-in-Chief of the Indian Armed Forces. After 26 January 1950, when India became a republic, the President of India became Commander-in-Chief, and the Ashoka Lion replaced the crown, with a five-pointed star being substituted for the "pip.")
	Lieutenant-Colonel	Indian Army	1947 (temporary)
	Brigadier	Indian Army	1949 (acting)
	Captain	Indian Army	26 January 1950 (recommissioning and change in insignia)
	Major	Indian Army	29 August 1950
	Lieutenant-Colonel	Indian Army	29 August 1951
	Colonel	Indian Army	29 August 1955
	Brigadier	Indian Army	20 August 1955 (acting); 29 August 1960 (substantive)
	Major General	Indian Army	September 1961 (acting); 16 April 1963 (substantive)
	Lieutenant General	Indian Army	29 May 1965 (acting); 8 June 1966 (substantive)

== Notes ==
Military offices
New title First holder	General Officer Commanding I Corps; May 1965 - January 1967	Succeeded by Jahangir Sataravala
