= India–Pakistan war of 1965 =

Armed conflict

- Part of India–Pakistan wars and conflicts and Cold War
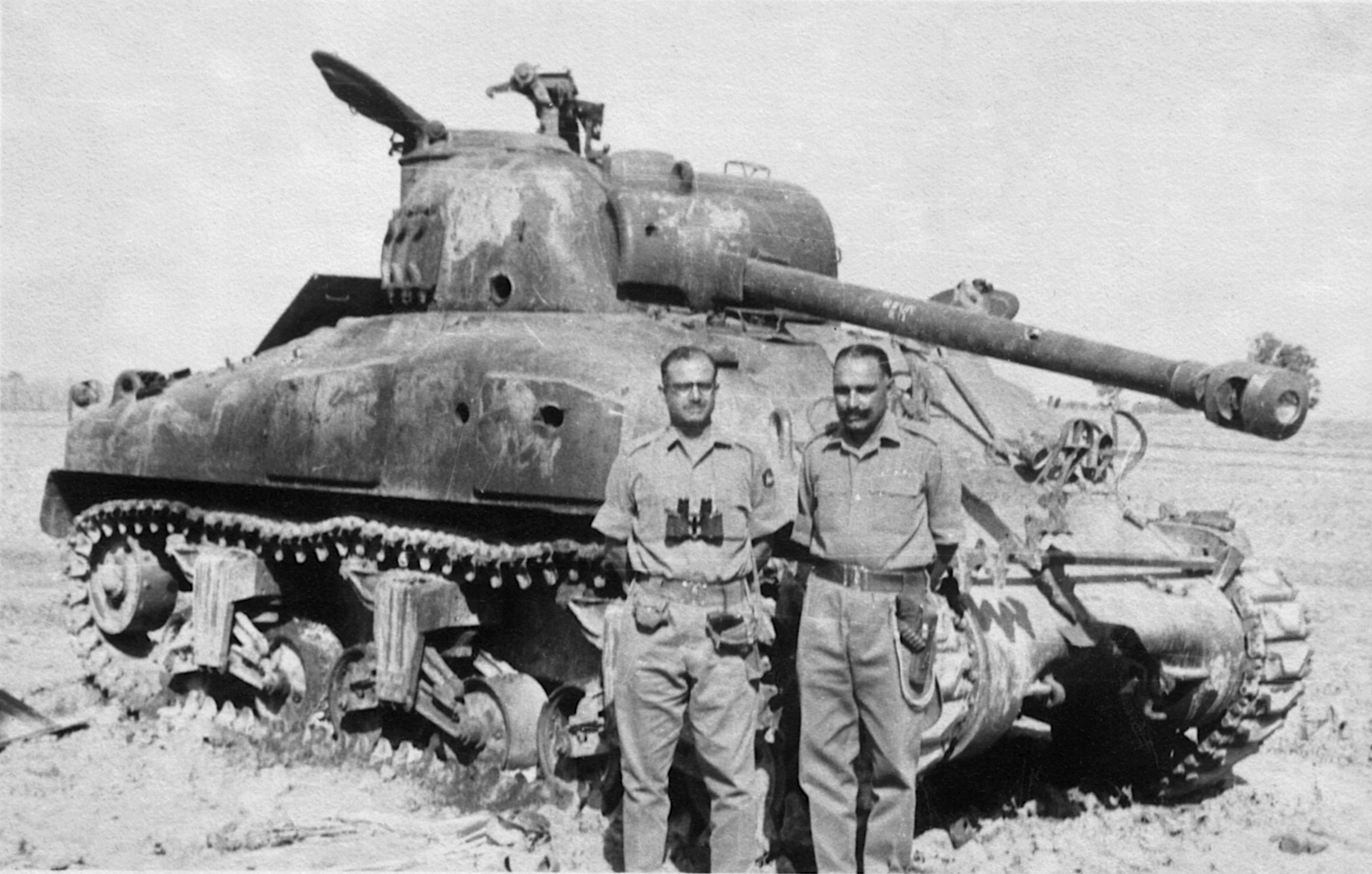
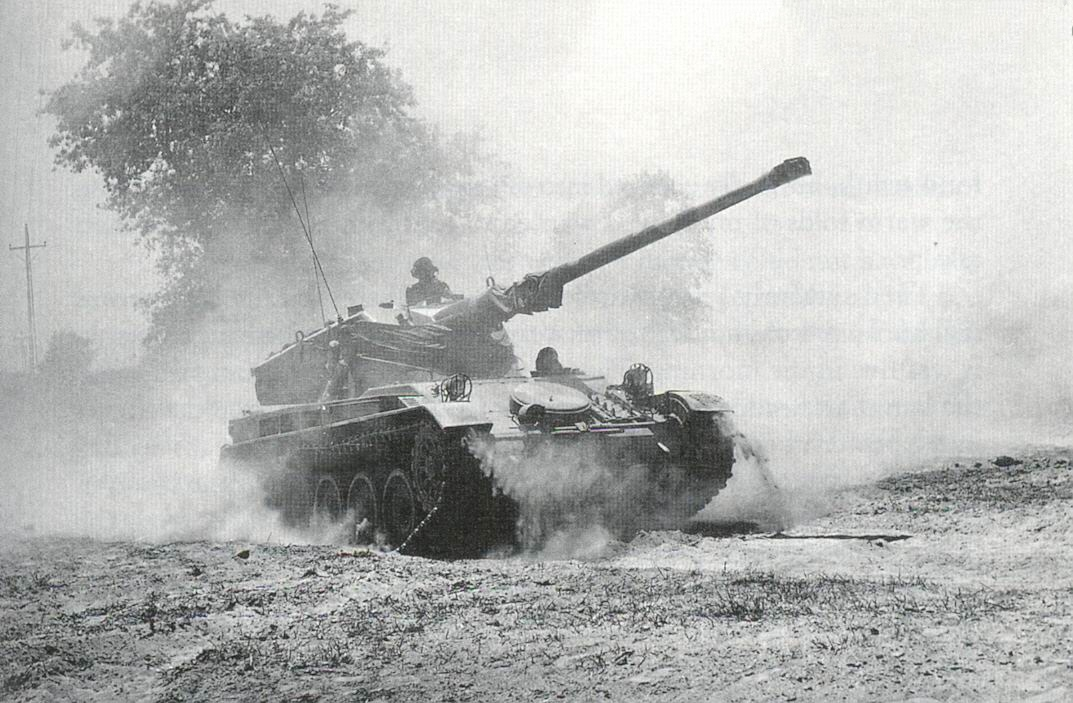
- Top, bottom: Indian soldiers with a destroyed Pakistani M4A1 Sherman tank Pakistani soldiers maneuvering a captured Indian AMX-13 tank
Date	5 August – 23 September 1965 (1 month, 2 weeks and 4 days)
Location	Kashmir; Punjab; Rajasthan; Bengal
Result	Inconclusive
Territorial changes	Status quo ante bellum

Belligerents
India	Pakistan

Commanders and leaders
Lal Bahadur Shastri; J. N. Chaudhuri; Arjan Singh; Joginder Dhillon; Harbaksh Singh; Har Kishan Sibal; Z. C. Bakshi	Ayub Khan; Musa Khan; Nur Khan; A. H. Malik; Yahya Khan; Abrar Hussain; A. R. Khan

Strength
700,000 infantry (whole army); 700+ aircraft 720 tanks: 186 Centurions; 346 Shermans; 90 AMX-13; 90 PT-76; 628 Artillery: 66x 3.7" How; 450x 25pdr; 96x 5.5"; 16x 7.2"; Effective strength on the West Pakistan Border: 9 infantry divisions (4 under-strength); 3 armoured brigades	260,000 infantry (whole army); 280 aircraft ~950 tanks: 330–350 M47 Pattons delivered between 1955 and 1960, ~200 M48 Pattons delivered between 1961 and 1964; 308 Shermans; 96 Chaffees; 552 Artillery: 72x 105mm How; 234x 25pdr; 126x 155mm How; 48x 8" How; 72x 3.7" How; AK Lt Btys; Effective strength on the West Pakistan Border: 6 infantry divisions; 2 armoured divisions

Casualties and losses
Neutral claims: 3,000 killed; 150 –200 tanks; 60–75 aircraft	Neutral claims: 3,800 killed; 200–300 tanks; 19–20 aircraft

The India–Pakistan war of 1965, also known as the second Kashmir war, was an armed conflict between Pakistan and India that took place from August 1965 to September 1965.

The conflict began following Pakistan's unsuccessful Operation Gibraltar, which was designed to infiltrate forces into Jammu and Kashmir to precipitate an insurgency against Indian rule. The seventeen day war caused thousands of casualties on both sides and witnessed the largest engagement of armoured vehicles and the largest tank battle since World War II. Hostilities between the two countries ended after a ceasefire was declared through UNSC Resolution 211 following a diplomatic intervention by the Soviet Union and the United States, and the subsequent issuance of the Tashkent Declaration. Much of the war was fought by the countries' land forces in Kashmir and along the border between India and Pakistan. This war saw the largest amassing of troops in Kashmir since the Partition of India in 1947, a number that was overshadowed only during the 2001–2002 military standoff between India and Pakistan. Most of the battles were fought by opposing infantry and armoured units, with substantial backing from air forces, and naval operations.

India had the upper hand over Pakistan on the ground when the ceasefire was declared, but the PAF managed to achieve air superiority over the combat zones despite being numerically inferior. Although the two countries fought to a standoff, the conflict is seen as a strategic and political defeat for Pakistan, as it had not succeeded in fomenting an insurrection in Kashmir and was instead forced to shift gears in the defence of Lahore. India also failed to achieve its objective of military deterrence and did not capitalise on its advantageous military situation before the ceasefire was declared.

== Background ==
Since the partition of British India in August 1947, Pakistan and India remained in contention over several issues. Although the Kashmir conflict was the predominant issue dividing the nations, other border disputes existed, most notably over the Rann of Kutch, a barren region in the Indian state of Gujarat. The issue first arose in 1956, which ended with India regaining control over the disputed area. In the 1960s Pakistan received 700 million dollars of military aid from the United States, by signing a defence agreement in 1954, which significantly modernised Pakistan's military equipment. After the defeat in 1962 Sino-Indian War, the Indian military was undergoing major changes in personnel and equipment. During this period, despite being numerically smaller than the Indian military, Pakistan's armed forces had a qualitative edge in air power and armour over India, which Pakistan sought to use before India completed its defence build-up.

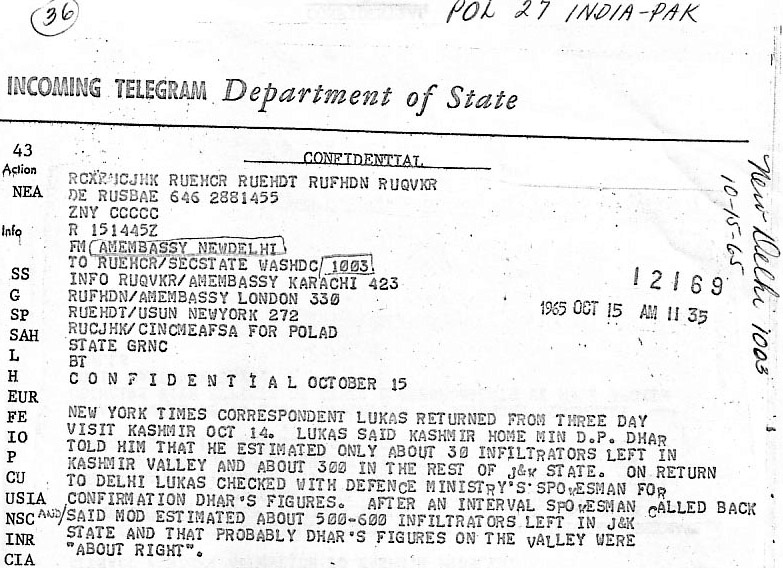
A declassified US State Department letter that confirms the existence of hundreds of "infiltrators" in the Indian-administered part of the disputed Kashmir region. Dated during the events running up to the 1965 war.

Pakistani soldiers began patrolling in territory controlled by India in January 1965, which was followed by attacks by both countries on each other's posts on 8 April 1965. Initially involving border police from both nations, the disputed area soon witnessed intermittent skirmishes between the countries' armed forces. Pakistan launched Operation Desert Hawk and captured a few Indian posts near the Kanjarkot fort border area. In June 1965, British Prime Minister Harold Wilson successfully persuaded both countries to end hostilities. Both countries signed an agreement to settle the disputed border through international arbitration by the International Court of Justice on 30 June 1965. A tribunal was set to resolve the dispute, the verdict which came later in 1968, saw Pakistan awarded 780 square kilometres (301 square miles) of the Rann of Kutch, as against its original claim of 9,100 km^{2} (3,500 sq mi). Pakistan's purpose for this operation was to assess the response of the Indian government and military and to draw Indian armour southward to Kutch, away from the Punjab and Kashmir region.

After its success in the Rann of Kutch, Pakistan, under the leadership of Muhammad Ayub Khan, believed the Indian Army would be unable to defend itself against a quick military campaign in the disputed territory of Kashmir as the Indian military had suffered a loss to China in 1962 in the Sino-Indian War. Pakistan believed that the population of Kashmir was generally discontented with Indian rule, and that a resistance movement could be ignited by a few infiltrating saboteurs.

== War ==
=== Operation Gibraltar ===
On 5 August 1965, Pakistani soldiers crossed the Line of Control dressed as Kashmiri locals headed for various areas within Kashmir. These infiltrators carried out intelligence collection with the help of locals in cities like Gulmarg and Rajouri. Indian forces, tipped off by the local populace, captured several Pakistani soldiers who revealed that Pakistan was attempting to ignite the resistance movement employing a covert infiltration, code-named Operation Gibraltar. The operation was eventually unsuccessful.

On 6 and 7 August, Indian forces engaged in skirmishes with several columns of Pakistani soldiers, who tried to cut communication lines and mix with the locals during celebrations.

Indian Army crossed the cease fire line on 15 August and captured several previously infiltrated peaks overlooking the Srinagar – Leh Highway. Initially, the Indian Army met with considerable success, capturing three important mountain positions after a prolonged artillery barrage. By the end of August, Pakistan had made progress in areas such as Tithwal, Uri and Poonch.

=== Haji Pir pass ===
Wishing to stop the influx of Pakistani forces into the Uri-Poonch bulge, COAS Jayanto Nath Chaudhuri commanded the XV Corps under Lt Gen K. S. Katoch to advance and take over Haji Pir pass. Under the watch of Lt Gen Harbaksh Singh, led by Brig. ZC Bakshi of the 68 Infantry Brigade, Indian forces captured the Haji Pir pass, 8 km into Pakistan administered Kashmir by 28 August.

=== Chhamb offensive ===
On 1 September 1965, Pakistan launched a counterattack, called Operation Grand Slam, with the objective to capture the vital town of Akhnoor in Jammu, which would sever communications and cut off supply routes to Indian troops. Ayub Khan calculated that "Hindu morale would not stand more than a couple of hard blows at the right time and place" although by this time Operation Gibraltar had failed and India had captured the Haji Pir Pass.

Commander of the Western army, Lt Gen Harbaksh Singh had suggested after the capture of Haji Pir, that Pakistani forces would carry out a major offensive in the Chumb plain to advance and capture a strategically important location in Akhnoor to cut Indian supply lines but after a meeting with CAOS Chaudhari, the area was not reinforced. Instead, XV Corps under Lt Gen Katoch was tasked with securing Nowshera.

At 03:30 on 1 September 1965, the entire Chumb area came under massive artillery bombardment as Pakistan commenced Operation Grand Slam. India's Army Headquarters was taken by surprise. Attacking with an overwhelming ratio of troops and technically superior tanks, Pakistan made gains against Indian forces under the command of Maj Gen A. H. Malik, who were caught unprepared and suffered heavy losses. Maj Gen Mailk was then replaced by Maj Gen Yahya Khan by C-in-C Gen Muhammad Musa who authorised Maj Gen Khan to advance deeper into Indian Territory.

India responded by calling in its air force to blunt the Pakistani attack. The next day, Pakistan retaliated with its air force and attacked Indian forces and air bases in both Kashmir and Punjab. India then decided to open up the theatre of attack into Pakistani Punjab and forced the Pakistani army to relocate troops engaged in the Chumb operation to defend Punjab. Operation Grand Slam therefore failed, as the Pakistan Army was unable to capture Akhnoor; it became one of the turning points in the war, when India decided to relieve pressure on its troops in Kashmir by attacking Pakistan further south. In the valley, another area of strategic importance was Kargil. Kargil town was in Indian hands, but Pakistan occupied high ground overlooking Kargil and Srinagar-Leh road. However, after the launch of a massive anti-infiltration operation by the Indian army, the Pakistani infiltrators were forced out of that area in the month of August.

=== Ichogil Canal ===
India crossed the International Border on the Western front on 6 September. President Ayub Khan, on the same day, declared a state of emergency through radio broadcast proclaiming that Pakistan was in a state of war with India. On 6 September, the 15th Infantry Division of the Indian Army, under World War II veteran Major General Niranjan Prasad, battled a massive counterattack by Pakistan near the west bank of the Icchogil Canal (BRB Canal), which was an in fact border of India and Pakistan. The General's entourage itself was ambushed, and he was forced to flee his vehicle.

==== Battle of Jassar ====
The Battle of Jassar, fought on 6 September involved the defense of the Jassar Enclave, a Pakistani area on the Ravi River, against an Indian attack, with Pakistani forces, including the 3 Punjab and 13 FF, repelling the assault.

==== Battle of Burki ====
The 7th Infantry Division under the command of Maj Gen Har Kishan Sibal attempted an offensive on the canal on 6 September. The forces advanced through Khalra-Barki- Lahore road and reached Barki by 7 September. The forces engaged heavily at the Battle of Burki. The battle involved the air forces, armoured, infantry divisions and artillery brigades from both sides. The town fell by 11 September. A great amount of Pakistani ammunition was captured from Barki which helped Indian forces after the battle. The Indian artillery stood within the range of Lahore International Airport. As a result, the United States requested a temporary ceasefire to allow it to evacuate its citizens in Lahore.

==== Battle of Dograi ====
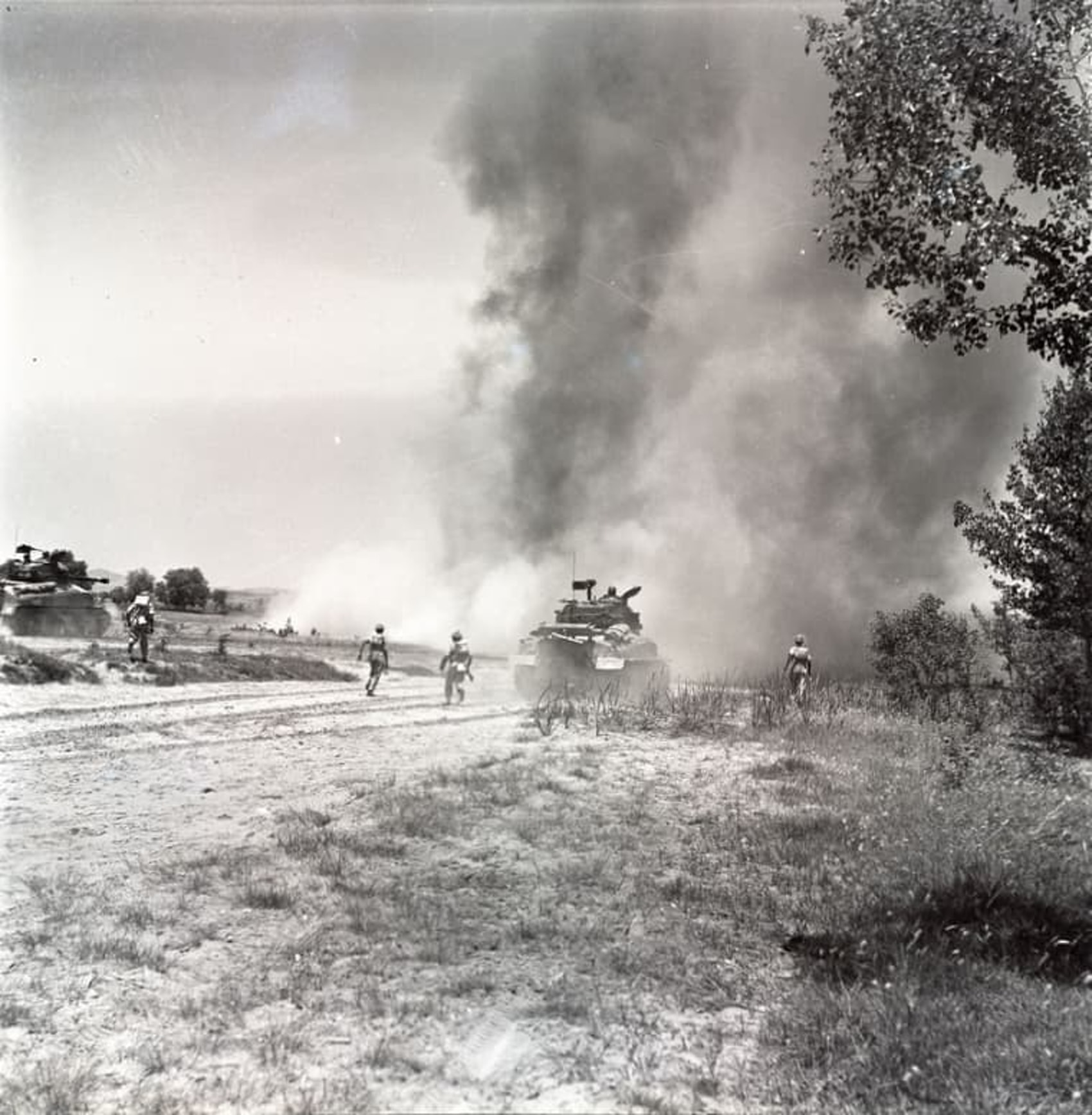
Pakistani Sherman medium tanks and infantry push forward while under fire.

The thrust against Lahore consisted of the 1st Infantry Division supported by the three tank regiments of the 2nd Independent Armoured Brigade; they quickly advanced across the border, reaching the Ichhogil (BRB) Canal by 6 September. The Pakistani Army held the bridges over the canal or blew up those it could not hold, effectively stalling any further advance by the Indians on Lahore. 3rd Jat battalion was the first Indian unit to cross the Icchogil canal and capture it alongside Dograi. The same day, a counteroffensive consisting of an armoured division and infantry division supported by Pakistan Air Force Sabres forced the Indian 15th Division to withdraw to its starting point. Although 3 Jats suffered minimal casualties, the bulk of the damage being taken by ammunition and store vehicles, the higher commanders had no information of 3 Jats' capture of Dograi and misleading information led to the command to withdraw from Batapore and Dograi to Ghosal-Dial. This move brought extreme disappointment to Lt-Col Desmond Hayde, CO of the 3 Jats. Dograi was eventually recaptured by the three Jats on 21 September, for the second time but after a much harder battle due to Pakistani reinforcements, in the Battle of Dograi.

On 8 September 1965, a company of five Maratha Light Infantry was sent to reinforce a Rajasthan Armed Constabulary (RAC) post at Munabao – a strategic hamlet about 250 kilometers from Jodhpur. Their brief was simple: to hold the post and to keep Pakistan's infantry battalions from overrunning the post at bay. But at Maratha Hill (in Munabao) – as the post has now been christened – the Indian company could barely manage to thwart the intense attack for 24 hours. A company of three guards with 954 heavy mortar battery ordered to reinforce the RAC post at Munabao could never reach. The Pakistani Air Force had strafed the entire area, and also hit a railway train coming from Barmer with reinforcements near Gadra Road railway station. On 10 September, Munabao fell into Pakistani hands, and efforts to capture the strategic point did not succeed.

=== Sialkot offensive ===
==== Battle of Phillora ====
On the days following 9 September, India's 1st Armoured Division under Major General Rajinder Singh advanced towards Sialkot with the intention to capture the sector and was met with Pakistan's 6th Armoured Division under Maj Gen Abrar Hussain. They first engaged in the town of Phillora. Failure on the Pakistani side to cause damage to the Indian advance forced the 6th Armoured Division to retreat to the town of Chawinda on 11 September and the Battle of Phillora was an Indian success. Pakistan lost 66 tanks in the battle while India only lost 6.

==== Battle of Chawinda ====
The Pakistani I Corps under the command of Lt Gen Bakhtiar Rana and the 6th Armoured under Maj Gen Hussain engaged with the Indian I Corps commanded by the newly appointed Lieutenant General Patrick Dunn and the 1st Armoured under Rajinder Singh from 14 to 19 September in the largest tank battle since the Battle of Kursk during the World War II. It also involved the lowest ever air battle to be fought as the Pakistani Sabre engaged with the Indian Gnats. The Indian offensive was repulsed and stopped successfully. Pakistan claimed that Indians lost 120 tanks at Chawinda. compared to 44 of its own. But later, Indian official sources confirmed India lost only 29 tanks at Chawinda,

Towards the end of the Sialkot offensive, the Pakistani Armoured arsenal was left heavily damaged with more than 200 tanks destroyed and 36 captured which was very heavy compared to the Indian damages.

=== Battle of Asal Uttar ===
On 8 September, the Pakistani 1st Armoured Division and 11 Infantry Division under the command of Maj Gen Nasir Khan pushed an offensive towards Khem Karan, with the intent to capture Amritsar (a major city in Punjab, India) and the bridge on River Beas to Jalandhar. India then launched a counter-offensive. After India breached the Madhupur canal on 11 September, the Khem Karan counter-offensive was halted, affecting Pakistan's strategy substantially. The Pakistani forces engaged with an outnumbered Indian force comprising only the 2nd Independent Armoured Brigade commanded by Brig Thomas K. Theogaraj, who formed a defensive horseshoe formation to counter the advancing Pakistani force.

The Pakistani tanks were more numerous and superior in quality, giving them a significant advantage. At the Battle of Asal Uttar, however, the Pakistani force advanced into the well-positioned and well-camouflaged Indian formation, which led to approximately 97 Pakistani tanks being destroyed, against only 10 Indian tanks lost. The battle was a tremendous success for India and completely halted the Pakistani advance on the Punjab front. The town where the battle was fought came to be known as Patton Nagar, named after the thoroughly destroyed US-made M48 Patton tanks in the battle.

During the battle, Pakistani rail bound reinforcements were attacked and destroyed by IAF Gnats.

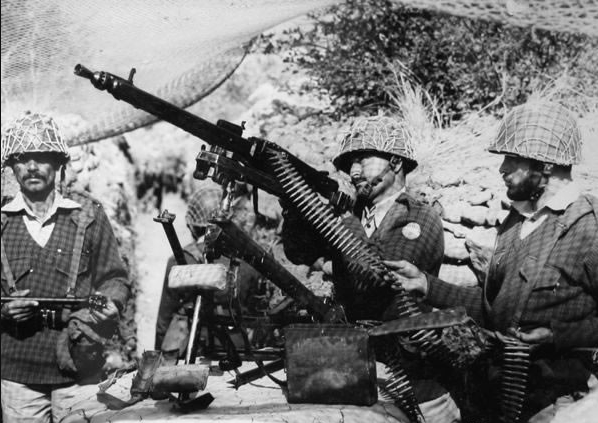
Pakistani Army Position, MG1A3 AA, 1965 War

=== Stalemate ===
The war was heading for a stalemate, with both nations holding territory of the other. The Indian army suffered from 3,000 killed, while Pakistan suffered from 3,800 killed. India claimed that they had possession of 1,920 km^{2} (740 sq mi) of Pakistani territory and the Pakistan army held 550 km^{2} (210 sq mi) of Indian territory. The territory occupied by India was mainly in the fertile Sialkot, Lahore and Kashmir sectors, while Pakistani ground gains were primarily in deserts opposite Sindh and in the Chumb sector in Kashmir. Pakistan claims that it held 4,190 km^{2} (1,620 sq mi) of Indian territory, while losing 1,160 km^{2} (446 sq mi) of its territory.

=== Aerial warfare ===
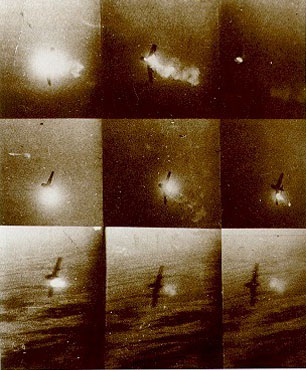
Pakistani Sabre being shot down in combat by an Indian Gnat in September 1965 as seen from the Indian aircraft.

The war saw the aircraft of the Indian Air Force (IAF) and the Pakistan Air Force (PAF) engaging in combat for the first time since independence. Although the two forces had previously faced off in the First Kashmir War during the late 1940s, that engagement was very limited in scale compared to the 1965 conflict.

The IAF was flying large numbers of Hawker Hunters, Indian-manufactured Folland Gnats, de Havilland Vampires, EE Canberra bombers and a squadron of MiG-21s. The PAF's fighter force comprised 102 F-86F Sabres and 12 F-104 Starfighters, along with 24 B-57 Canberra bombers. During the conflict, the PAF claimed it was out-numbered by around 5:1.

The PAF's aircraft were largely of American origin, whereas the IAF flew an assortment of British and Soviet airplanes. However, the PAF's American aircraft were superior to those of the IAF's.

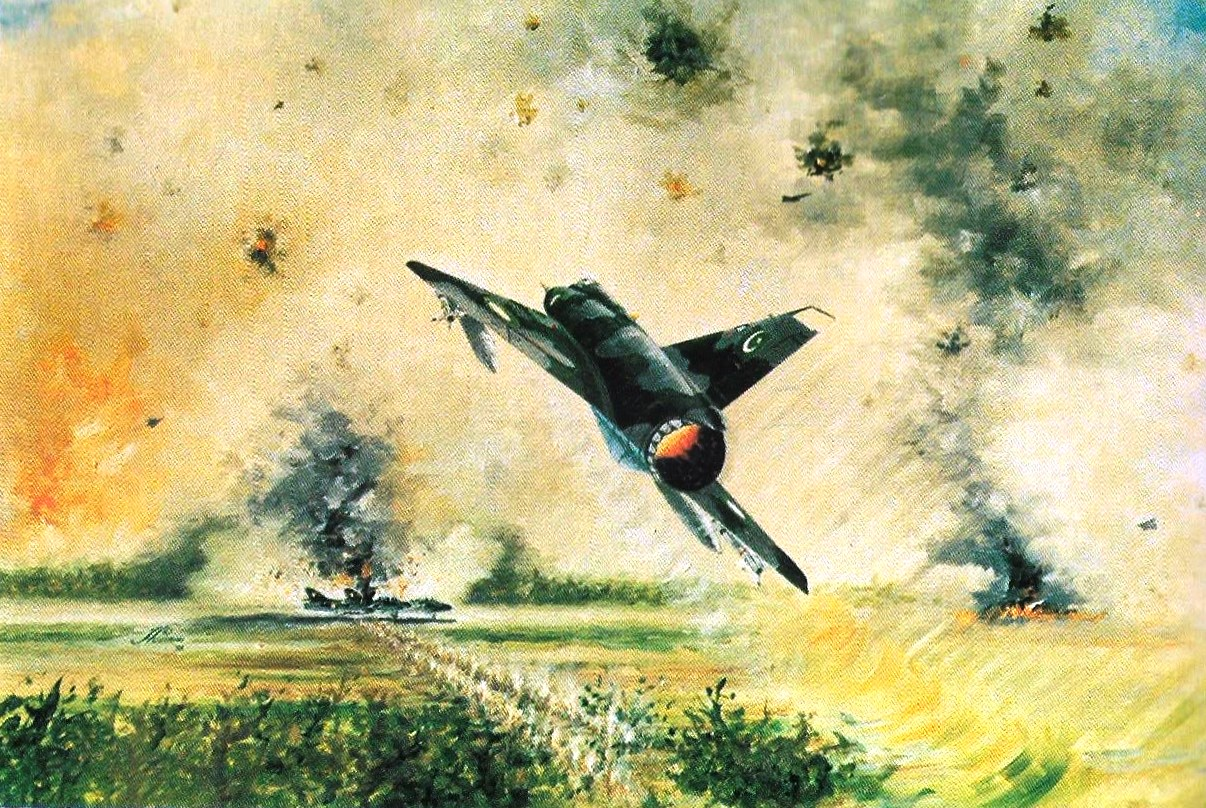
Artist's depiction of Pakistani Fighter Jet

The F-86 Sabre was vulnerable to the diminutive Folland Gnat, nicknamed "Sabre Slayer". The Gnat is credited by many independent and Indian sources as having shot down seven Pakistani Canadair Sabres (Note: License-built North American F-86 Sabres with Canadian engines.) in the 1965 war, while two Gnats were downed by PAF fighters. The PAF's F-104 Starfighter was the fastest fighter operating in the subcontinent at that time and was often referred to as "the pride of the PAF". However, according to Air Commodore Sajad Haider, the F-104 did not deserve this reputation. Being "a high-level interceptor designed to neutralise Soviet strategic bombers at altitudes above 40,000 feet (12.19 km)," rather than engage in dogfights with agile fighters at low altitudes, it was "unsuited to the tactical environment of the region". In combat the Starfighter was not as effective as the IAF's far more agile, albeit much slower, Folland Gnat fighter. Yet it zoomed into an ongoing dogfight between Sabres and Gnats, at supersonic speed, successfully broke off the fight and caused the Gnats to egress.

An IAF Gnat, piloted by Squadron Leader Brij Pal Singh Sikand, landed at an abandoned Pakistani airstrip at Pasrur, as he lacked the fuel to return to his base, and was captured by the Pakistan Army. According to the pilot, he got separated from his formation due to a malfunctioning compass and radio. This Gnat is displayed as a war trophy in the Pakistan Air Force Museum, Karachi. Sqn Ldr Saad Hatmi who flew the captured aircraft to Sargodha, and later tested and evaluated its flight performance, presumed that Gnat was no "Sabre Slayer" when it came to dog fighting. Three Indian civilian aircraft were shot down by PAF, one of which shot down at Bhuj, Gujarat was carrying Balwantrai Mehta, chief minister of the Indian state of Gujarat, total eight killed in the incident along with Balwantrai Mehta and his wife. The Pakistan Air Force had fought well in countering the much larger Indian Air Force and supported the ground forces.

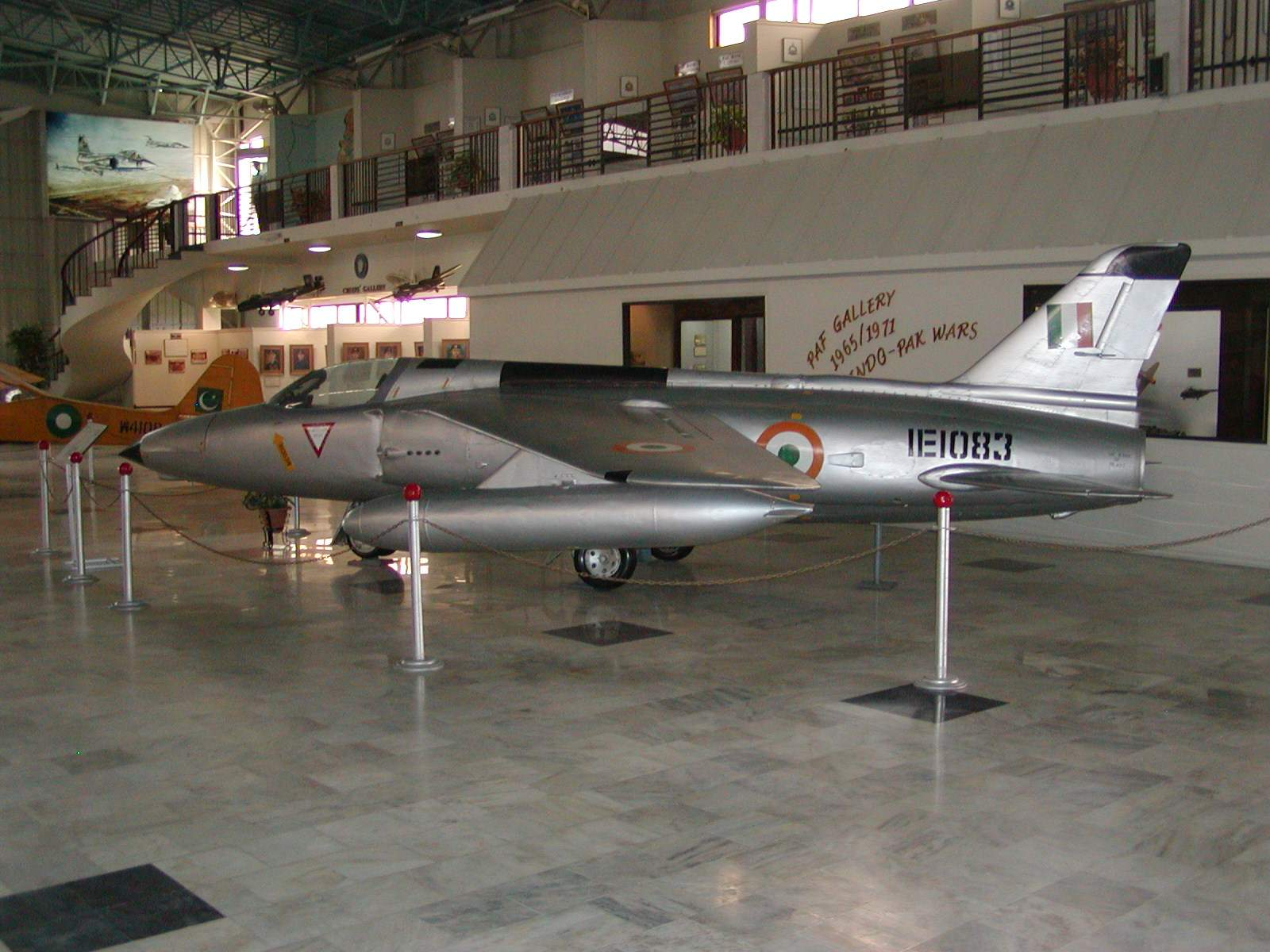
Captured Indian Folland Gnat on display at the PAF Museum, Karachi

The two countries have made contradictory claims of combat losses during the war, and few neutral sources have verified the claims of either country. The PAF claimed it shot down 104 IAF planes and lost 19 of its own, while the IAF claimed it shot down 73 PAF planes and lost 59. According to PAF, it flew 86 F-86 Sabres, 10 F-104 Star fighters and 20 B-57 Canberra's in a parade soon after the war was over. Thus disproving the IAF's claim of downing 73 PAF fighters, which at the time constituted nearly the entire Pakistani front-line fighter force. Indian sources have pointed out that, despite PAF claims of losing only a squadron of combat craft, Pakistan sought to acquire additional aircraft from Indonesia, Iraq, Iran, Turkey, and China within 10 days of the beginning of the war.

The two air forces were rather equal in the conflict because much of the Indian air force remained farther east to guard against the possibility of China entering the war. According to independent sources, the PAF lost 20 aircraft while the Indians lost 60–75. Pakistan ended the war having depleted 17 percent of its front-line strength, while India's losses amounted to less than 10 percent. The loss rate had begun to even out, and it has been estimated that another three weeks' fighting would have seen the Pakistani losses rising to 33 percent and India's losses totalling 15 percent. Air superiority was not achieved, and they were unable to prevent IAF fighter bombers and reconnaissance Canberras from flying daylight missions over Pakistan. Thus, 1965 was a stalemate in terms of the air war with neither side able to achieve complete air superiority. After the war, India's Chief of Air Staff Marshal Arjan Singh claimed that the IAF was able to achieve air superiority within three days of the Pakistani air strikes. However, according to Kenneth Werrell, the Pakistan Air Force "did well in the conflict and probably had the edge". When hostilities broke out, the Pakistan Air Force with around 100 F-86s faced an enemy with five times as many combat aircraft; the Indians were also equipped with comparatively modern aircraft inventory. Despite this, Werrell credits the PAF as having the advantage of a "decade's experience with the Sabre" and experienced pilots. One Pakistani fighter pilot, MM Alam, was credited with the record of downing five Indian aircraft in less than a minute, becoming the first known flying ace since the Korean War. His claims were never confirmed by the PAF and are disputed by Indian sources and some PAF officials.

=== Usage of tanks in battle ===
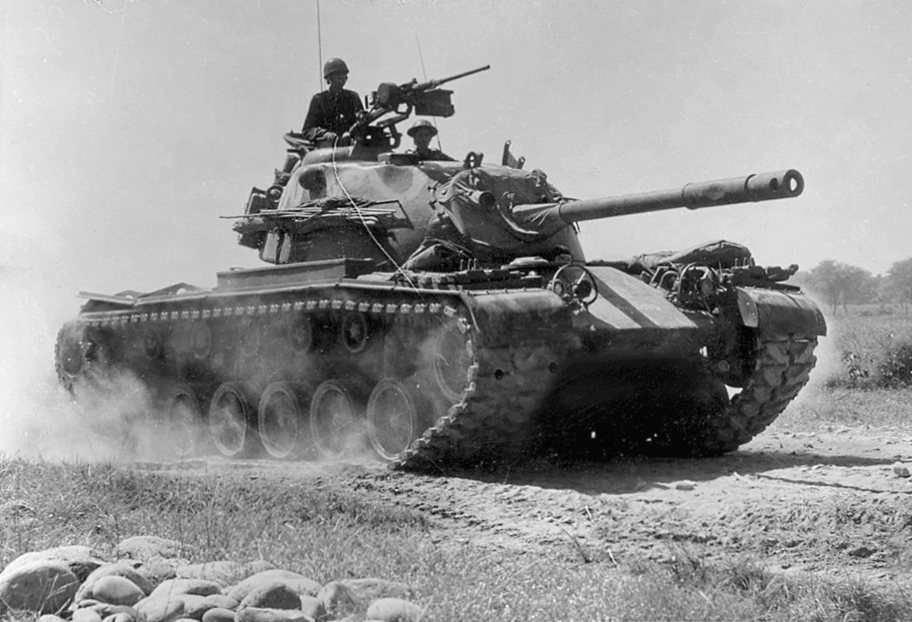
A Pakistani M48A1 Patton tank advances in Chamb sector of Kashmir during Operation Grand Slam. in 1965.

The 1965 war witnessed some of the largest tank battles since World War II. At the beginning of the war, the Pakistani Army had both a numerical advantage in tanks, and better equipment overall. Pakistani armour was largely American-made; it consisted mainly of Patton M-47 and M-48 tanks, but also included many M4 Sherman tanks, some M24 Chaffee light tanks and M36 Jackson tank destroyers, equipped with 90 mm guns. The bulk of India's tank fleet was older M4 Sherman tanks; some were up-gunned with the French high-velocity CN 75 50 guns and could hold their own, whilst some older models were still equipped with the inferior 75 mm M3 L/40 gun. Besides the M4 tanks, India fielded the British-made Centurion Tank Mk 7, with the 20pdr (84 mm) gun Royal Ordnance QF 20-pounder gun, and the AMX-13, PT-76, and M3 Stuart light tanks. Pakistan fielded a more significant number and more modern artillery; its guns out-ranged those of the Indian artillery, according to Pakistan's Major General T.H. Malik.

At the outbreak of war in 1965, Pakistan had about 15 armoured cavalry regiments, each with about 50 tanks divided into three squadrons. In addition, there were 4 additional regiments termed "tank delivery units" (TDUs), i.e. 30, 31, 32 and 33 TDU (presumably to deceive the Indian military planners as to their actual tank strength), each consisting of two tank squadrons and one M-36B Jackson tank destroyer squadron. Besides the Patton, there were about 200 M4 Shermans re-armed with 76 mm guns, 150 M24 Chaffee light tank and a few independent squadrons of M36B1 tank destroyers. Most of these regiments served in Pakistan's two armoured divisions, the 1st and 6th Armoured divisions – the latter being in the process of formation.

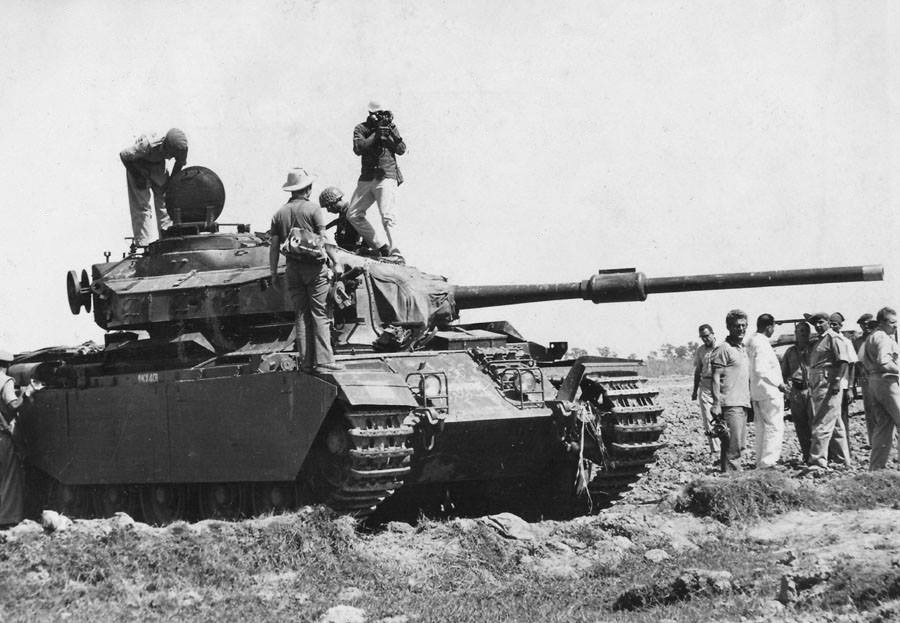
Indian Centurion tank being examined by journalists near Chawinda

The Indian Army of the time possessed 15 cavalry regiments, and in the 1950s had begun modernising them by the acquisition of 164 AMX-13 light tanks and 188 Centurions. The remainder of the cavalry units were equipped with M4 Shermans and some M3A3 Stuart light tanks. India had only a single armoured division, the 1st 'Black Elephant' Armoured Division, which consisted of the 17th Horse (The Poona Horse), also called 'Fakhr-i-Hind' ('Pride of India'), the 4th Horse (Hodson's Horse), the 16th Cavalry, the 2nd Lancers, and the 62nd Cavalry, the two first named being equipped with Centurions. There was also the 2nd Independent Armoured Brigade, one of whose three regiments, the 3rd Cavalry, was also equipped with Centurions. Despite the qualitative and numerical superiority of Pakistani armour, Pakistan was outfought on the battlefield by India, which made progress into the Lahore-Sialkot sector, whilst halting Pakistan's counteroffensive on Amritsar; they were sometimes employed faultily, such as charging prepared defences during the defeat of Pakistan's 1st Armoured Division at Asal Uttar.

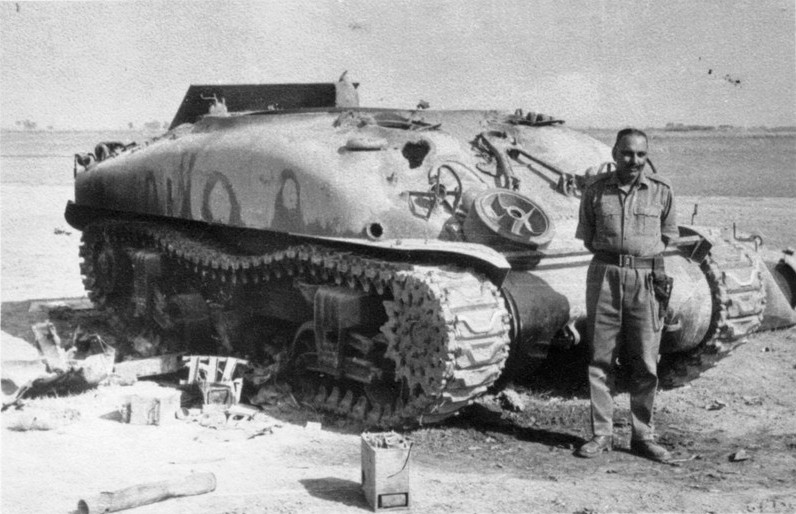
Destroyed Pakistani Sherman Tank

Neither the Indian nor Pakistani Army showed any great facility in the use of armoured formations in offensive operations, whether the Pakistani 1st Armoured Division at Asal Uttar (Battle of Asal Uttar) or the Indian 1st Armoured Division at Chawinda. In contrast, both proved adept with smaller forces in a defensive role, such as India's 2nd Armoured Brigade at Asal Uttar and Pakistan's 25th Cavalry at Chawinda.

The Centurion battle tank, with its 20pdr gun and heavy armour, performed better than the overly complex Patton.

=== Naval hostilities ===
Naval operations did not play a prominent role in the war of 1965. While a small Indian detachment under the aircraft carrier INS Vikrant had deployed to Gujarat following Operation Desert Hawk, most Indian Navy ships were in drydock under maintenance when hostilities broke out in September. On 7 September, a flotilla of the Pakistan Navy commanded by Commodore S.M. Anwar, carried out a bombardment of the Indian Navy's radar station coastal town of Dwarka, which was 320 kilometres (200 mi) south of the Pakistani port of Karachi. Operation Dwarka, as it is known, is a significant naval operation of the 1965 war contested as a nuisance raid by some. The attack on Dwarka led to questions being asked in India's parliament and subsequent post-war modernisation and expansion of the Indian Navy, with an increase in budget from Rs. 35 crores to Rs. 115 crores. Indian sources claim that it was not their intention to get into a naval conflict with Pakistan, and wished to restrict the war to a land-based conflict.

Also during the war, over 100 Indian coastal vessels containing valuable cargo were seized in East Pakistan on the orders of Rear Admiral S. M. Ahsan, the Chairman of the East Pakistan Inland Water Transport Authority.

=== Covert operations ===
The Pakistan Army launched numerous covert operations to infiltrate and sabotage Indian airbases. On 7 September 1965, the Special Services Group (SSG) commandos were parachuted into enemy territory. According to Commander-in-Chief of the Pakistan Army General Muhammad Musa, about 135 commandos were airdropped at three Indian airfields (Halwara, Pathankot and Adampur). The daring attempt turned out to be an "unmitigated disaster". Only 22 commandos returned to Pakistan as planned, 93 were taken prisoner (including one of the Commanders of the operations, Major Khalid Butt), and 20 were killed in encounters with the army, police, or civilians. The reason for the failure of the commando mission is attributed to the failure to provide maps, proper briefings and adequate planning or preparation.

Despite failing to sabotage the airfields, Pakistan sources claim that the commando mission affected some planned Indian operations. As the Indian 14th Infantry Division was diverted to hunt for paratroopers, the Pakistan Air Force found the road filled with transport, and destroyed many vehicles.

India responded to the covert activity by announcing rewards for captured Pakistani spies or paratroopers. Meanwhile, in Pakistan, rumours spread that India had retaliated with its own covert operations, sending commandos deep into Pakistan territory, but these rumours were later determined to be unfounded.

== Assessment of losses ==
India and Pakistan make widely divergent claims about the damage they inflicted on each other and the amount of damage suffered by them. The following summarises each nation's claims.

	Indian claims	Pakistani claims	Independent Sources
Casualties	Army: 169 commissioned officers (1 brigadier, 9 lieutenant-colonels, 30 majors, 39 captains, 11 lieutenants, 79 second lieutenants), 80 junior commissioned officers (JCO), 1,820 other ranks; Air force: 19 officers, 21 other ranks	1,039 Pakistani soldiers, 9,500 Indian soldiers	3,000 Indian soldiers, 3,800 Pakistani soldiers
Combat flying effort	4,073+ combat sorties	2,279 combat sorties	
Aircraft lost	59 IAF (official), 43 PAF. In addition, Indian sources claim that there were 13 IAF aircraft lost in accidents, and three Indian civilian aircraft shot down.	19 PAF, 104 IAF	20 PAF, 60–75 IAF
Aerial victories	17 + 3 (post-war)	30	–
Tanks destroyed	128 Indian tanks, 152 Pakistani tanks captured, 150 Pakistani tanks destroyed. Officially, 471 Pakistani tanks destroyed and 38 captured	165 Pakistan tanks, 475 Indian tanks	
Land area won	1,900 km^{2} (720 mi^{2}) of Pakistani territory	4,190 km^{2} (1,617 mi^{2}) of Indian territory	India held 1,840 km^{2} (710 sq mi) of Pakistani territory and Pakistan held 540 km^{2} (210 mi^{2}) of Indian territory

=== Neutral assessments ===
There have been several neutral assessments of the losses incurred by both India and Pakistan during the war. Most of these assessments agree that India had the upper hand over Pakistan when the ceasefire was declared. Some neutral assessments are mentioned below –

- According to the Library of Congress Country Studies conducted by the Federal Research Division of the United States –

The war was militarily inconclusive; each side held prisoners and some territory belonging to the other. Losses were relatively heavy—on the Pakistani side, twenty aircraft, 200 tanks, and 3,800 troops. Pakistan's army had been able to withstand Indian pressure, but a continuation of the fighting would only have led to further losses and ultimate defeat for Pakistan. Most Pakistanis, schooled in the belief of their own martial prowess, refused to accept the possibility of their country's military defeat by "Hindu India" and were, instead, quick to blame their failure to attain their military aims on what they considered to be the ineptitude of Ayub Khan and his government.

- Former New York Times reporter Arif Jamal wrote in his book Shadow War –

This time, India's victory was nearly total: India accepted a cease-fire only after it had occupied 740 square miles [1,900 km^{2}], though Pakistan had made marginal gains of 210 square miles [540 km^{2}] of territory. Despite the obvious strength of the Indian win, both countries claim to have been victorious.

- Devin T. Hagerty wrote in his book South Asia in World Politics –

The invading Indian forces outfought their Pakistani counterparts and halted their attack on the outskirts of Lahore, Pakistan's second-largest city. By the time the United Nations intervened on September 22, Pakistan had suffered a clear defeat.

- In his book National Identity and Geopolitical Visions, Gertjan Dijkink writes –

The superior Indian forces, however, won a decisive victory and the army could have even marched on into Pakistani territory had external pressure not forced both combatants to cease their war efforts.

- An excerpt from Stanley Wolpert's India, summarising the India–Pakistan war of 1965,

In three weeks, the second Indo-Pak War ended in what appeared to be a draw when the embargo placed by Washington on U.S. ammunition and replacements for both armies forced the cessation of conflict before either side won a clear victory. India, however, was in a position to inflict grave damage to, if not capture, Pakistan's capital of the Punjab when the cease-fire was called, and controlled Kashmir's strategic Uri-Poonch bulge, much to Ayub's chagrin.

- In his book titled The greater game: India's race with destiny and China, David Van Praagh wrote –

India won the war. It held on to the Vale of Kashmir, the prize Pakistan vainly sought. It gained 1,840 km^{2} [710 sq mi] of Pakistani territory: 640 km^{2} [250 sq mi] in Azad Kashmir, Pakistan's portion of the state; 460 km^{2} [180 sq mi] of the Sailkot sector; 380 km^{2} [150 sq mi] far to the south of Sindh; and most critical, 360 km^{2} [140 sq mi] on the Lahore front. Pakistan took 540 km^{2} [210 sq mi] of Indian territory: 490 km^{2} [190 sq mi] in the Chhamb sector and 50 km^{2} [19 sq mi] around Khem Karan.

- Dennis Kux's India and the United States: Estranged Democracies also provides a summary of the war,

Although both sides lost heavily in men and material, and neither gained a decisive military advantage, India had the best of the war. New Delhi achieved its basic goal of thwarting Pakistan's attempt to seize Kashmir by force. Pakistan gained nothing from a conflict which it had instigated.

- A Region in Turmoil: South Asian Conflicts since 1947 by Rob Johnson mentions –

India's strategic aims were modest – it aimed to deny the Pakistani Army victory, although it ended up in possession of 720 square miles [1,900 km^{2}] of Pakistani territory for the loss of just 220 square miles [570 km^{2}] of its own.

- An excerpt from William M. Carpenter and David G. Wiencek's Asian Security Handbook: Terrorism and the New Security Environment –

A brief, but furious 1965 war with India began with a covert Pakistani thrust across the Kashmiri cease-fire line and ended up with the city of Lahore threatened with encirclement by the Indian Army. Another UN-sponsored cease-fire left borders unchanged, but Pakistan's vulnerability had again been exposed.

- English historian John Keay's India: A History provides a summary of the 1965 war –

The 1965 Indo-Pak war lasted barely a month. Pakistan made gains in the Rajasthan desert, but its main push against India's Jammu-Srinagar road link was repulsed, and Indian tanks advanced to within a sight of Lahore. Both sides claimed victory, but India had most to celebrate.

- Uk Heo and Shale Asher Horowitz write in their book Conflict in Asia: Korea, China–Taiwan, and India–Pakistan –

Again, India appeared, logistically at least, to be in a superior position, but neither side was able to mobilize enough strength to gain a decisive victory.

- According to the Office of the Historian within the U.S. Department of State:

Conflict resumed again in early 1965, when Pakistani and Indian forces clashed over disputed territory along the border between the two nations. Hostilities intensified that August when the Pakistani army attempted to take Kashmir by force. The attempt to seize the state was unsuccessful, and the second India-Pakistan War reached a stalemate.

- Anthony Tucker-Jones writes in his book Tank Battles of the Cold War, 1948–1991:

Both sides fought each other to a stalemate. Shortly after they agreed to a cease-fire, with each side having lost about 200 tanks.

== Ceasefire ==
On 20 September, the United Nations Security Council unanimously passed a resolution, which noted that its previous two resolutions went "unheeded" and now "demanded" an unconditional ceasefire from both nations within 48 hours. India immediately accepted, (Note: India accepted unconditional ceasefire in principle as early as 14 September.) while Pakistan accepted it on 23 September, with some notable dramatics.

India and Pakistan accused each other of ceasefire violations; India charged Pakistan with 585 violations in 34 days, while Pakistan countered with accusations of 450 incidents by India. In addition to the expected exchange of small arms and artillery fire, India reported that Pakistan used the ceasefire to capture the Indian village of Chananwalla in the Fazilka sector. This village was recaptured by Indian troops on 25 December. On 10 October, a B-57 Canberra on loan to the PAF was damaged by three SA-2 missiles fired from the IAF base at Ambala. A Pakistani Army Auster AOP was shot down on 16 December, killing one Pakistani army captain; on 2 February 1967, an AOP was shot down by IAF Hawker Hunters.

The ceasefire remained in effect until the start of the India–Pakistan war of 1971.

=== Tashkent Declaration ===
The United States and the Soviet Union used significant diplomatic tools to prevent any further escalation in the conflict between the two South Asian nations. The Soviet Union, led by Premier Alexei Kosygin, hosted peace negotiations in Tashkent (now in Uzbekistan), where Indian Prime Minister Lal Bahadur Shastri and Pakistani President Muhammad Ayub Khan signed the Tashkent Declaration on 10 January 1966, agreeing to withdraw to pre-August lines no later than 25 February 1966. In India, the agreement was criticised because it did not contain a no-war pact or any renunciation of guerrilla warfare across Kashmir.

India's Prime Minister, Shastri, suffered a fatal heart attack soon after the Tashkent Agreement on 11 January 1966. As a consequence, the public outcry in India against the peace declaration transformed into a wave of sympathy for the ruling Indian National Congress.

=== Public perceptions ===
The ceasefire was criticised by many Pakistanis who, relying on fabricated official reports and the controlled Pakistani press, believed that the leadership had surrendered military gains. The protests led to student riots. Pakistan State's reports had suggested that their military was performing admirably in the war – which they incorrectly blamed as being initiated by India – and thus the Tashkent Declaration was seen as having forfeited the gains. Some recent books written by Pakistani authors, including one by ex-ISI chief Lieutenant General Mahmud Ahmed Durrani initially titled The Myth of 1965 Victory, reportedly exposed Pakistani fabrications about the war, but all copies of the book were bought by the Pakistan Army to prevent circulation because the topic was "too sensitive". The book was published with the revised title History of Indo Pak War 1965, published by Services Book Club, a part of the Pakistan military and printed by Oxford University Press, Karachi. A few copies of the book have survived. A version was published in India as Illusion of Victory: A Military History of the Indo-Pak War-1965 by Lexicon Publishers. Recently a new Pakistani impression has been published in 2017.

== Intelligence failures ==
Strategic miscalculations by both India and Pakistan ensured that the war ended in a stalemate. In part, this inspired Shekhar Gupta to coin the protologism, "war of mutual incompetence".

=== Indian miscalculations ===
Indian military intelligence gave no warning of the impending Pakistan invasion. The Indian Army failed to recognise the presence of heavy Pakistani artillery and armaments in Chumb and suffered significant losses as a result.

The "Official War History – 1965", drafted by the Ministry of Defence of India in 1992, was a long-suppressed document that revealed other miscalculations. According to the document, on 22 September when the Security Council was pressing for a ceasefire, the Indian Prime Minister asked commanding Gen. Chaudhuri if India could possibly win the war, were he to delay accepting the ceasefire. The general replied that most of India's frontline ammunition had been used up, and the Indian Army had suffered considerable tank losses. It was determined later that only 14% of India's frontline ammunition had been fired, and India held twice the number of tanks as Pakistan. By this time, the Pakistani Army had used close to 80% of its ammunition.

Air Chief Marshal (retd.) P.C. Lal, who was the Vice Chief of Air Staff during the conflict, points to the lack of coordination between the IAF and the Indian army. Neither side revealed its battle plans to the other. The battle plans, drafted by the Ministry of Defence and General Chaudhari, did not specify a role for the Indian Air Force in the order of battle. This attitude of Gen. Chaudhari was referred to by ACM Lal as the "Supremo Syndrome", a patronising attitude sometimes held by the Indian army towards the other branches of the Indian Military.

=== Pakistani miscalculations ===
The Pakistani Army's failures began with the supposition that a generally discontented Kashmiri people would revolt against their Indian rulers, bringing about a swift and decisive victory. The Kashmiri people, on the other hand, remained calm and collected. The Indian Army was given enough information to understand Operation Gibraltar and that they were battling not insurgents, as they had initially thought, but Pakistani Army regulars.

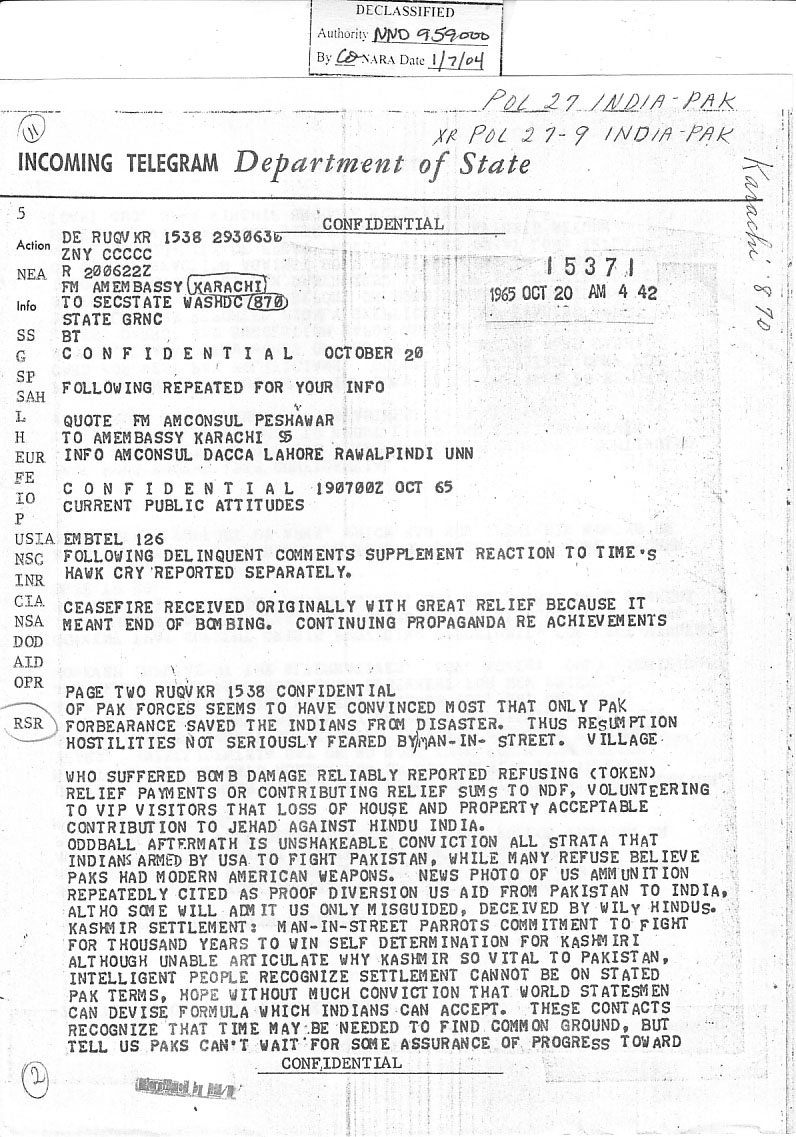
Telegram from the Embassy of the United States in Karachi: "Continuing propaganda regarding achievements of PAK forces seems to have convinced most that only PAK forbearance saved the Indians from disaster."

The Pakistani Army didn't know that Indian leaders wanted to attack the southern part of the country to start a new war. Pakistan had to send troops to the southern part of the country to protect Sialkot and Lahore instead of using them to help get to Kashmir.

Pakistan's attempt to capture Ahnoor, a town north-east of Jammu and a key region for communications between Kashmir and the rest of India, was a failure. Many Pakistani commentators said that the Ayub Khan administration was indecisive during "Operation Grand Slam". The critics contend that the mission was unsuccessful due to Ayub Khan's awareness of the significance of Akhnoor to India, referring to it as India's 'jugular vein', and his reluctance to invade it and initiate a conflict. Although progress was made in Akhnoor, General Ayub Khan relieved the commanding officer, Major General Akhtar Hussain Malik, and replaced him with General Yahya Khan. During the replacement, a 24-hour pause was observed, enabling the Indian army to regroup in Akhnoor and successfully repel a sluggish assault led by General Yahya Khan. The Indian Chief of Staff of the Western Command said, "The enemy came to our rescue." Then, Akhtar Hussain Malik criticised Ayub Khan for inventing Operation Gibraltar, which ultimately failed, and for denying him command at a crucial point in the conflict. Malik said he would tell the truth about the war and how the army failed, but later decided not to because he was afraid of being banned.

Some authors have said that a war game – that was held in March 1965 at the Institute for Defense Analyses in the United States might have encouraged Pakistan. The exercise concluded that Pakistan would prevail in the event of a conflict with India. Other authors like Stephen P. Cohen, have consistently commented that the Pakistan Army had "acquired an exaggerated view of the weakness of both India and the Indian military … the 1965 war was a shock."

During the war, the Pakistani Air Marshal and Commander-in-Chief of PAF, Nur Khan, later stated that it is the Pakistan Army that should be held accountable for initiating the conflict, rather than India. However, propaganda about the war continued in Pakistan, with most of the blame being placed on the leadership and little importance given to intelligence failures. This pattern persisted until the disastrous outcome of the India–Pakistan war in 1971.

== Involvement of other nations ==
The United States and the United Kingdom have been the principal suppliers of military matériel to India and Pakistan since 1947. Both India and Pakistan were Commonwealth republics. While India had pursued a policy of nominal non-alignment, Pakistan was a member of both CENTO and SEATO and an ally of the West in its struggle against communism. Well before the conflict began, however, Britain and the United States had suspected Pakistan of joining both alliances out of opportunism to acquire advanced weapons for a war against India. They had therefore limited their military aid to Pakistan to maintain the existing balance of power in the subcontinent. In 1959, however, Pakistan and the United States had signed an Agreement of Cooperation under which the United States agreed to take "appropriate action, including the use of armed forces" to assist the Government of Pakistan at its request. By 1965, American and British analysts had recognised the two international groupings, CENTO and SEATO, and Pakistan's continued alliance with the West as being largely meaningless.

Following the start of the 1965 war, both the United States and Britain took the view that the conflict was largely Pakistan's fault, and suspended all arms shipments to both India and Pakistan. While the United States maintained a neutral stance, the British Prime Minister, Harold Wilson, condemned India for aggression after its army advanced towards Lahore; his statement was met with a furious rebuttal from India.

Internationally, the level of support which Pakistan received was limited at best. Iran and Turkey issued a joint communiqué on 10 September which placed the blame on India, backed the United Nations' appeal for a cease-fire and offered to deploy troops for a UN peacekeeping mission in Kashmir. Pakistan received support from Indonesia, Iran, Turkey, and Saudi Arabia in the form of six naval vessels, jet fuel, guns, and ammunition and financial support, respectively. Pakistan didn't gain meaningful support at an international level.

Since before the war, the People's Republic of China had been a major military associate of Pakistan and a military opponent of India, with whom it had fought a brief war in 1962. China had also become a foreign patron for Pakistan and had given Pakistan $60 million in development assistance in 1965. During the war, China openly supported the Pakistani position. It took advantage of the conflict to issue a strongly worded ultimatum to India condemning its "aggression" in Tibet and hinting at nuclear retaliation by China (China had exploded its first nuclear device the previous year). Despite strong fears of Chinese intervention on the side of Pakistan, the Chinese government ultimately exercised restraint. This was partly due to the logistical difficulties of a direct Chinese military intervention against India and India's improved military strength after its defeat by China in 1962. China had also received strong warnings by the American and Soviet governments against expanding the scope of the conflict by intervening. In the face of this pressure, China backed down, extending the deadline for India to respond to its ultimatum and warning India against attacking East Pakistan. Ultimately, Pakistan rejected Chinese offers of military aid, recognising that accepting it would only result in further alienating Pakistan internationally. International opinion considered China's actions to be dangerously reckless and aggressive, and it was soundly rebuked in the world press for its unnecessarily provocative stance during the conflict.

India's participation in the Non-Aligned Movement yielded little support from its members. Support given by Indonesia to Pakistan was seen as a major Indian diplomatic failure, as Indonesia had been among the founding members of the Non-Aligned Movement along with India. Despite its close relations with India, the Soviet Union was more neutral than other nations during the war, inviting both nations to peace talks under its aegis in Tashkent.

== Aftermath ==
=== India ===
Despite the declaration of a ceasefire, India was perceived by many as the victor due to its success in halting the Pakistan-backed insurgency in Kashmir. In its 1 October 1965 issue, Time magazine quoted a Western official assessing the consequences of the war: "Now it's apparent to everybody that India is going to emerge as an Asian power in its own right."

In light of the failures of the Sino-Indian War, the outcome of the 1965 war was viewed as a "politico-strategic" victory for India. The Indian prime minister, Lal Bahadur Shastri, was hailed as a national hero in India.

While the overall performance of the Indian military was praised, military leaders were criticised for their failure to effectively deploy India's superior armed forces to achieve a decisive victory over Pakistan. In his book War in the modern world since 1815, noted war historian Jeremy Black said that though Pakistan "lost heavily" during the 1965 war, India's hasty decision to call for negotiations prevented further considerable damage to the Pakistan Armed Forces. He elaborates:

India's chief of army staff urged negotiations on the ground that they were running out of ammunition and their number of tanks had become seriously depleted. In fact, the army had used less than 15% of its ammunition compared to Pakistan, which had consumed closer to 80 percent and India had double the number of serviceable tanks.

In 2015, Marshal of the Indian Air Force Arjan Singh, the last surviving armed force commander of the conflict, gave his assessment that the war ended in a stalemate, but only due to international pressure for a ceasefire, and that India would have achieved a decisive victory had hostilities continued for a few days more:

For political reasons, Pakistan claims victory in the 1965 war. In my opinion, the war ended in a kind of stalemate. We were in a position of strength. Had the war continued for a few more days, we would have gained a decisive victory. I advised then prime minister Lal Bahadur Shastri not to agree to a ceasefire. But I think he was pressured by the United Nations and some countries.

As a consequence, India focussed on enhancing communication and coordination within and among the tri-services of the Indian Armed Forces. Partly as a result of the inefficient information gathering preceding the war, India established the Research and Analysis Wing for external espionage and intelligence. Major improvements were also made in command and control to address various shortcomings and the positive impact of these changes was clearly visible during the India–Pakistan war of 1971 when India achieved a decisive victory over Pakistan within two weeks.

China's repeated threats to intervene in the conflict supporting Pakistan increased pressure on the government to take an immediate decision to develop nuclear weapons. Despite repeated assurances, the United States did little to prevent extensive use of American arms by Pakistani forces during the conflict, thus irking India. At the same time, the United States and United Kingdom refused to supply India with sophisticated weaponry which further strained the relations between the West and India. These developments led to a significant change in India's foreign policy – India, which had previously championed the cause of non-alignment, distanced itself further from Western powers and developed close relations with the Soviet Union. By the end of the 1960s, the Soviet Union emerged as the biggest supplier of military hardware to India. From 1967 to 1977, 81% of India's arms imports were from the Soviet Union. After the 1965 war, the arms race between India and Pakistan became even more asymmetric and India was outdistancing Pakistan by far. India's defence budget too would increase gradually after the war. In 1966–1967, it would rise to 17% and by 1970–1971 it would rise to 25% of its revenue. According to World Bank data, India's defence expenditure by GDP decreased from 3.871% in 1965 to 3.141% in 1969, then slightly increased to 3.652% in 1971.

=== Pakistan ===
After the war, a significant number of Pakistanis regarded their military performance to be positive. In Pakistan, 6 September is celebrated as Defence Day to remember how Lahore was able to defend itself against the Indian army. The performance of the Pakistani Air Force was particularly praised.

The Pakistani government was accused of spreading misinformation about the consequences of the war among its citizens. In his book Mainsprings of Indian and Pakistani foreign policies, S.M. Burke writes –

After the Indo-Pakistani war of 1965, the balance of military power had decisively shifted in favor of India. Pakistan had found it difficult to replace the heavy equipment lost during that conflict while her adversary, despite her economic and political problems, had been determinedly building up her strength.

Air Marshal (retired) Nur Khan, who headed the Pakistan Air Force in 1965, said in an interview with Dawn newspaper –

The army "misled the nation with a big lie" – that India rather than Pakistan provoked the war – and that Pakistan won a "great victory".

And since the "lie" was never rectified, the Pakistani "army came to believe its fiction, (and) has continued to fight unwanted wars,"

Pakistani commentator Haidar Imtiaz remarked:

The myth of 'victory' was created after the war had ended, to counter Indian claims of victory on the one hand and to shield the Ayub regime and the army from criticism on the other.

A book titled Indo-Pakistan War of 1965: A Flashback, produced by the Inter-Services Public Relations of Pakistan, is used as the official history of the war, which omits any mention of the operations Gibraltar and Grand Slam, and begins with the Indian counter-offensive on the Lahore front. The Pakistan Army is claimed to have put up a "valiant defense of the motherland" and forced the attack in its tracks.

Most people agree that the idea of a mobile, hard-hitting Pakistan Army was badly hurt during the war because important breakthroughs were not made. The military's ill-founded belief that their "martial race" of soldiers could defeat "Hindu India" in the conflict was criticised by several Pakistani writers. Rasul Bux Rais, a Pakistani political analyst wrote –

The 1965 war with India proved that Pakistan could neither break the formidable Indian defenses in an intense violent military campaign fashion nor could she sustain an all-out conflict for long.

Historian Akbar S Zaidi notes that Pakistan "lost terribly in the 1965 war".

The Pakistani air force, on the other hand, racked up considerable acclaim and esteem among the military and international warfare critics for its defence of Lahore and other crucial parts of the country and its hefty retaliation against India the day afterward. The air force's vigilance was also influenced by the fact that some pilots were frantically re-enlisted six times in a single hour when they detected Indian air raids. In Pakistan, the air force and army are honored on Defence Day and Air Force Day. These days are on 6 and 7 September, respectively.

Furthermore, Pakistan had lost more ground than it had gained during the conflict, and, perhaps even more crucial, it had failed to secure Kashmir. Many people consider this outcome to be a setback for Pakistan.

The faulty planning of Operation Gibraltar was criticised by senior Pakistani officials and military experts, which ultimately led to the conflict. The Tashkent declaration was also criticised in Pakistan, even though few people were aware of the seriousness of the situation at the end of the conflict. Political leaders were also subjected to criticism. Ayub Khan had espoused high expectations among the Pakistani populace regarding the superiority, if not invincibility, of its armed forces, in accordance with the guidance of Zulfikar Ali Bhutto, the foreign minister of Pakistan. Nonetheless, the failure of Pakistan to attain its military objectives during the conflict resulted in a political liability for Ayub. After the defeat of its Kashmiri ambitions, an increasingly vocal opposition challenged the army's invincibility.

The economic contraction in Pakistan was one of the most significant outcomes of the conflict. Pakistan had experienced impressive economic growth since the early 1960s, but the war ended that. Between 1964 and 1966, Pakistan's defence spending rose from 4.82% to 9.86% of GDP, putting a tremendous strain on its economy. In 1970–71, the expenditure on defence accounted for 32% or 55.66% of the total government expenditure. According to veterans of the war, the war greatly cost Pakistan economically, politically, and militarily. Nuclear theorist Feroze Khan maintained that the 1965 war was a last conventional attempt to snatch Kashmir by military force, and Pakistan's own position in the international community, especially with the United States, began to deteriorate from the point the war started, while on the other hand, the alliance with China saw improvements. Chairman joint chiefs General Tariq Majid claims in his memoirs that Zhou Enlai had long advised the government in the classic style of Sun Tzu: "to go slow, not to push India hard, and avoid a fight over Kashmir, 'for at least, 20–30 years, until you have developed your economy and consolidated your national power'." General Majid maintained in Eating Grass that the "sane, philosophical and political critical thinking" was missing in Pakistan, and that the country had lost extensive human resources by fighting the war.

Pakistan was surprised by the lack of support from the United States, an ally with whom the country had signed an Agreement of Cooperation. The US turned neutral in the war when it cut off military supplies to Pakistan (and India); an action that the Pakistanis took as a sign of betrayal. After the war, Pakistan would increasingly look towards China as a major source of military hardware and political support.

Another negative consequence of the war was growing resentment against the Pakistani government in East Pakistan (present day Bangladesh), particularly for West Pakistan's obsession with Kashmir. Bengali leaders accused the central government of not providing adequate security for East Pakistan during the conflict, even though large sums of money were taken from the east to finance the war for Kashmir. In fact, despite some Pakistan Air Force attacks being launched from bases in East Pakistan during the war, India did not retaliate in that sector, although East Pakistan was defended only by an understrengthed infantry division (14th Division), sixteen planes and no tanks. Sheikh Mujibur Rahman was critical of the disparity in military resources deployed in East and West Pakistan, calling for greater autonomy for East Pakistan, an action that ultimately led to the Bangladesh Liberation War and another war between India and Pakistan in 1971.

Pakistan celebrates Defence Day every year to commemorate 6 September 1965 to pay tribute to the soldiers killed in the war. However, Pakistani journalists, including Taha Siddiqui and Haseeb Asif have criticised the celebration of Defence Day.

== Awards ==
=== National awards ===
- Santu Jouharmal Shahaney, an IOFS officer, served as the first Indian Director General Ordnance Factories (DGOF). He was awarded Padma Bhushan, by the Government of India, in the Civil Service category.
- K. C. Banerjee, an IOFS officer. Received Padma Shri in 1967, for his contributions during the India–Pakistan war of 1965, as the General Manager of Rifle Factory Ishapore, that developed and manufactured the 7.62 Self-Loading Automatic Rifle, that played decisive role in India's victory in the India–Pakistan war of 1965.
- Joginder Singh Dhillon, Lt. Gen, awarded the Padma Bhushan in 1966 by the Government of India for his role in the 1965 war, becoming the first Indian Army officer to receive the award.

=== Gallantry awards ===
For bravery, the following soldiers were awarded the highest gallantry award of their respective countries, the Indian award Param Vir Chakra and the Pakistani award Nishan-e-Haider:

India

- Company Quarter Master Havildar Abdul Hamid (Posthumous)
- Lieutenant-Colonel Ardeshir Burzorji Tarapore (Posthumous)

Pakistan

- Major Raja Aziz Bhatti Shaheed (Posthumous)

=== Battle honours ===
After the war, a total of 16 battle honours and three theatre honours were awarded to units of the Indian Army, the notable among which are:

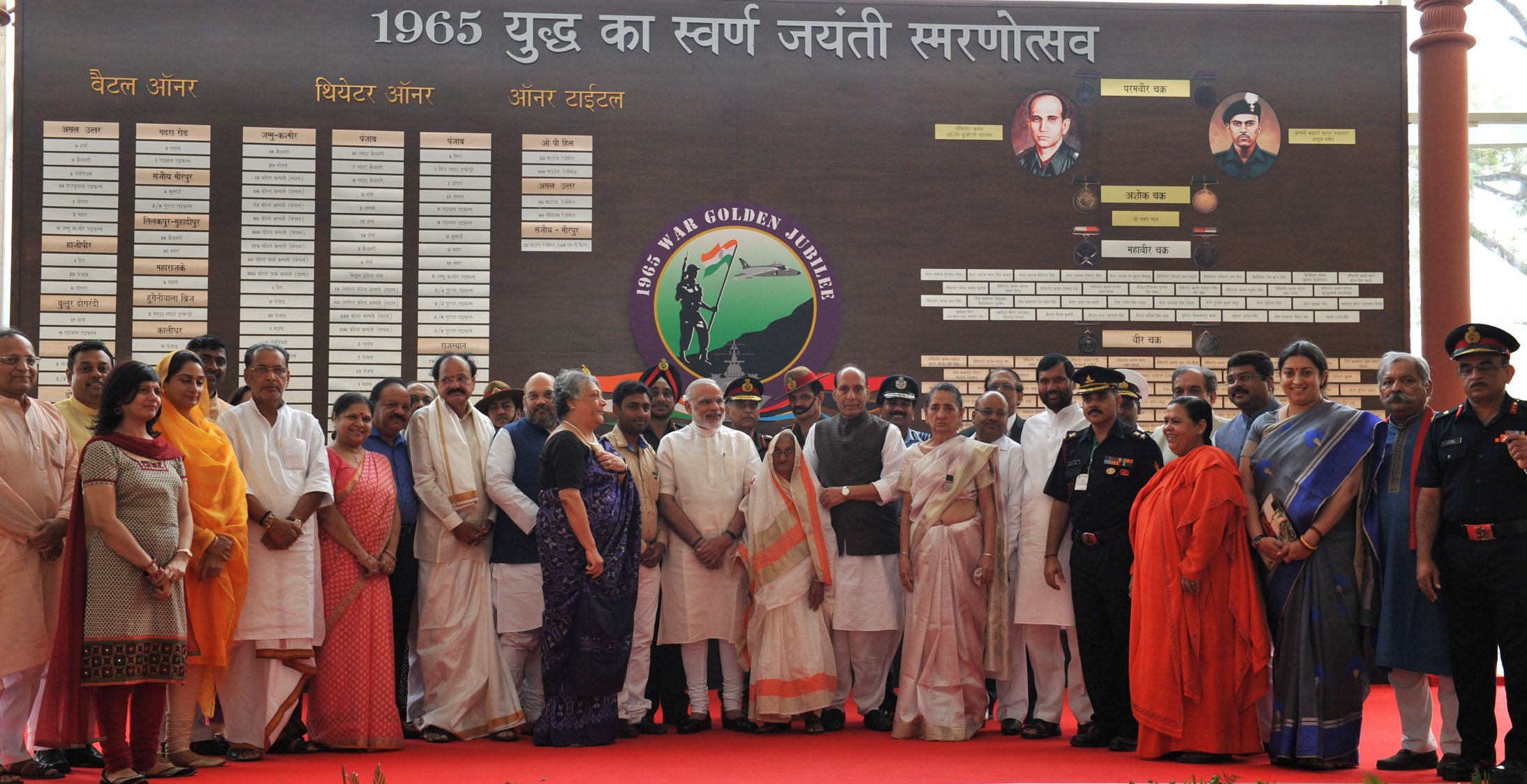
Indian Prime Minister Narendra Modi and other politicians visit Shauryanjali, a commemorative exhibition on the 1965 war, 17 September 2015

- Jammu and Kashmir, 1965 (theatre honour)
- Punjab 1965 (theatre honour)
- Rajasthan 1965 (theatre honour)
- Assal Uttar
- Burki
- Dograi
- Hajipir
- Hussainiwala
- Kalidhar
- OP Hill
- Phillora

== Bibliography ==
- First & Further reflections on the second Kashmir War (South Asia series) – 2 books by Louis Dupree.
- Asghar Khan, Mohammed (1979). The first round: Indo-Pakistan War, 1965. Islamic Information Services. ISBN 978-0-906041-11-6. Archived from the original on 7 February 2023.
- Ayub, Muhammad (2005). An army, its role and rule: a history of the Pakistan Army from Independence to Kargil, 1967–1999. RoseDog Books. ISBN 978-0-8059-9594-7. Archived from the original on 7 February 2023.
- Bajwa, Farooq (2013), From Kutch to Tashkent: The Indo-Pakistan War of 1965, London: C. Hurst & Co, ISBN 978-1-84904-230-7
- Berindranath, Dewan (1966). The war with Pakistan: A pictorial narration of the fifty days which rocked the sub-continent. Asia Press. Archived from the original on 7 February 2023.
- Bisht, Rachna (15 August 2015), 1965: Stories from the Second Indo-Pakistan War, Penguin UK, p. 60, ISBN 978-93-5214-129-6
- Brines, Russell (1968), The Indo-Pakistani Conflict, Pall Mall P., ISBN 978-0-269-16232-9 – via archive.org
- Faruquii, Ahmad (2003). Rethinking the national security of Pakistan: the price of strategic myopia. Ashgate Publishing. ISBN 978-0-7546-1497-5.
- Fricker, John (1979). Battle for Pakistan: the air war of 1965. Ian Allan. ISBN 978-0-7110-0929-5.
- Gupta, Hari Ram (1967). India-Pakistan war, 1965. Vol. 1 (1st ed.). Hariyana Prakashan. ASIN B0006FFBK8. Archived from the original on 7 February 2023.
- Haqqani, Hussain (2005). Pakistan: Between Mosque and Military. United Book Press. ISBN 978-0-87003-214-1. Archived from the original on 7 February 2023.
- Higgins, David R. (20 January 2016), M48 Patton vs Centurion: Indo-Pakistan War 1965, Osprey Publishing, p. 103, ISBN 978-1-4728-1094-6
- Ismail Siddiqui, Muhammad (1983). Die to live: A selection of short stories based on the 1965 Indo-Pakistan war (1st ed.). Wajidalis. ASIN B0006EL2OI. Archived from the original on 7 February 2023.
- Jamal, Arif (2009), Shadow War: The Untold Story of Jihad in Kashmir, Melville House, ISBN 978-1-933633-59-6, archived from the original on 7 February 2023
- McGarr, Paul (2013). The Cold War in South Asia: Britain, the United States and the Indian Subcontinent, 1945–1965. Cambridge University Press. ISBN 978-1-139-02207-1.
- Mohan, Jagan; Chopra, Samir (2005) [2005]. The India Pakistan Air War of 1965 (1st ed.). Manohar Publishers. ISBN 978-81-7304-641-4. Archived from the original on 7 February 2023.
- Paul, T. V. (10 March 1994), Asymmetric Conflicts: War Initiation by Weaker Powers, Cambridge University Press, ISBN 978-0-521-46621-9
- Praagh, David Van (2003), The Greater Game: India's Race with Destiny and China, McGill-Queen's Press – MQUP, ISBN 978-0-7735-2639-6, archived from the original on 7 February 2023
- Pradhan, R. D. (1 January 2007). 1965 War, the Inside Story: Defence Minister Y.B. Chavan's Diary of India-Pakistan War. Atlantic Publishers & Dist. ISBN 978-81-269-0762-5.
- Praval, Maj K C (2009). Indian Army after Independence. Lancer InterConsult, Inc. ISBN 978-1-935501-10-7. Archived from the original on 7 February 2023.
- Singh, Bhupinder (1982). 1965 war, role of tanks in India-Pakistan war. B.C. Publishers. ASIN B0000CQ9GQ. Archived from the original on 7 February 2023.
- Higgins, David R. (1991). M48 Patton vs Centurion – Indo-Pakistani War 1965 (Osprey Duel 71) Page 36. Osprey InterConsult, Inc. ISBN 1-4728-1092-9. Archived from the original on 7 February 2023.
- Tarapore, Arzan (2023) [Published online: 1 Oct 2019]. "Defence without deterrence: India's strategy in the 1965 war". Journal of Strategic Studies. 46 (1): 150–179. doi:10.1080/01402390.2019.1668274. ISSN 0140-2390. S2CID 211312207.
