= Chawinda =

City in Punjab, Pakistan

Chawinda چونڈہ
- Town
- Location within Punjab, Pakistan Location within Pakistan
- Coordinates: 32.3841°N 74.7249°E
- Country: Pakistan
- Province: Punjab
- District: Sialkot
- Tehsil: Pasrur

Government
  - MPA: Zain Khan
  - MNA: Ali Zahid; Ahsan Bajwa Chawinda (chairman)
  - Assistant Education Officer: Umer Farooq
- Elevation: 165 m (541 ft)

Population (2017)
  - Total: 26,906
- Time zone: UTC+5 (PST)
- Calling code: 052
- Union councils: 121

Chawinda (Urdu: چونڈہ) is a city located near village Sehna Wali in Pasrur Tehsil, Sialkot District, Punjab, Pakistan. The town sits at an altitude of 165 metres (541 ft), close to the border with Jammu and Kashmir.

Chawinda was the site of a key tank battle during the Indo-Pakistani War of 1965, where the Pakistani forces blocked the advance of the Indian Army which had thrust itself into the Sialkot district in an effort to thwart Pakistan's own advances into Indian-administered Kashmir.

Climate data for Chawinda
Month	Jan	Feb	Mar	Apr	May	Jun	Jul	Aug	Sep	Oct	Nov	Dec	Year
Mean daily maximum °C (°F)	18 (64)	21 (69)	26 (78)	33 (91)	39 (102)	40 (104)	35 (95)	33 (91)	34 (93)	32 (89)	26 (78)	20 (68)	29 (84)
Mean daily minimum °C (°F)	5 (41)	8 (46)	12 (53)	18 (64)	23 (73)	26 (78)	26 (78)	25 (77)	23 (73)	17 (62)	10 (50)	5 (41)	16 (60)
Average precipitation mm (inches)	41 (1.6)	40 (1.6)	44 (1.7)	21 (0.8)	17 (0.7)	68 (2.7)	271 (10.7)	256 (10.1)	132 (5.2)	14 (0.6)	11 (0.4)	21 (0.8)	936 (36.8)
Source: Weatherbase
