= Dalvir Singh =

Recipient of Vir Chakra

Major General Dalvir Singh AVSM, VrC, VSM
- Born: Dalvir Singh Redhu; 7 April 1946 (age 80); Loharheri, Rohtak, Haryana, India
- Relatives: Tarachand Singh Redhu (father)
- Military career
- Allegiance: Republic of India
- Branch: Indian Army
- Service years: 1967–2004
- Rank: Major General
- Nickname: Saint Soldier
- Service number: IC-26279
- Unit: 10th Battalion Special Forces
- Commands: CO 10th Battalion Special Forces, IG 52 SAG NSG, Deputy Director General (Special Ops) Indian Army, GOC Kilo Force Rashtriya Rifles, ADG Territorial Army (India)
- Conflicts: Indo-Pakistani War of 1971; Operation Black Thunder; Sri Lankan Civil War; Jammu and Kashmir Operations; Operation Parakram
- Awards: Ati Vishisht Seva Medal, Vir Chakra, Vishisht Seva Medal
- Other work: Director Training of Rajasthan Police Training Center(RPTC) Jodhpur

Major General Dalvir Singh AVSM, VrC, VSM (born 7 April 1946) is a retired Indian Special Forces officer, a former General Officer of the Indian Army and the recipient of Vir Chakra, India's third-highest War-time gallantry award. He has commanded the 10th Battalion Special Forces, the elite 52 Special Action Group of the NSG, Kilo Force of the Rashtriya Rifles and the Territorial Army (India), with distinction. After retirement from active military service, he has been serving as the Director Training of Rajasthan Police Training Center Jodhpur.

== Personal life ==
Dalvir Singh was born in a Hindu Jat family in the Loharheri village, Rohtak in the north Indian state of Haryana, as the son of Tarachand Singh Redhu. After retirement from active military service, in 2004, Dalvir Singh settled in Bikaner in the north-western border state of Rajasthan.

=== Education ===
Dalvir Singh is an alumnus of Rashtriya Military School Ajmer where he did his schooling. He graduated from the Indian Military Academy as a Commissioned Officer in 1967.

Dalvir Singh also has an M.Phil. in Defense Studies and has attended Staff College at Defence Services Staff College. He also did Higher Command Course at Army War College, Mhow and was selected for the prestigious Strategic Leadership Course at National Defence College (India).

== Military career ==
Dalvir Singh was commissioned into the Indian Army Corps of Engineers in 1967 as a Second Lieutenant and served in the Indo-Pakistani War of 1971 as an Army Engineer. In 1972 he opted for the Special Forces and volunteered for probation and cleared it. After clearing the probation as a Lieutenant, Dalvir Singh joined the 10 SF also known as Desert Scorpions, stationed in the arid State of Rajasthan.

Dalvir Singh was also one of the pioneer officers who played a vital role when National Security Guard was set up. He was also part of the 52 Special Action Group (SAG) from National Security Guard which specialized in anti-hijack missions and led many covert operations.

During his service in Sri Lanka, Dalvir Singh was given the nickname "Saint Soldier" by members of the LTTE, who cited his personal humility and performance in comat. He reportedly ate all three daily meals with his soldiers in their mess hall.

Dalvir Singh's peers in the Special Force consider him one of the toughest soldiers in the army. He, despite suffering from asthma throughout his life, kept on leading missions and maintained the fitness needed for serving in the Special Forces.

=== Operation Pawan ===
Dalvir Singh was the first Indian Special Forces Commanding Officer, along with his unit 10th Battalion Special Forces, to enter Sri Lanka and the last to leave as well. The unit was told that the mission was for 10 to 15 days and can return soon; the unit returned to India after 3 years, from a war-torn Sri Lanka.

As per orders, Dalvir Singh launched his SF team to hit the militants' HQ in the heart of Jaffna town, for searching the defence and for the capture of LTTE senior leadership, and as preliminary to final assault by the infantry troops. The Op which came to be known as the Jaffna University Helidrop Operation, the H-Hour was set at midnight of 11 October 1987. Led by Major Rajiv Nair, the Team Commander of the 10 SF, the first Stick of forty were inserted in the first flight of 2 Mi-8s. As the SF troop tried to hold their ground, waiting for the rest of the detail to reinforce, however, they came under sniper fire. Later on, it came to light that there was an intel leak about the conduct of the OP and there was also confusion about the number of LTTE cadres present at the site.

The LTTE which knew beforehand about the Op as they had tapped into Indian military communication, had already moved in snipers armed with telescopic sights. As the battle raged, they were able to inflict 6 casualties on the SF troops trying to hold the ground. The SF squad of 80, instead of the preplanned 120, was heavily outnumbered yet managed to move out of the open ground and sought refuge in an abandoned house where they holed up while fighting for the next 18 hours, awaiting rescue.

The news of the ambush reached Dalvir Singh and he immediately volunteered to move with the columns of infantry to the area, to establish contact with his SF troop. With utter disregard to his own safety, Dalvir Singh led his relief team to the objective in the face of heavy militant fire. On the way, he spotted the tank troop commanded by Maj. Anil Kaul, and incorporated them into the rescue plan. They came under heavy fire and the tank commander was incapacitated and Dalvir Singh who had never operated tanks before had to take up the command of the tank troops as well and directed them to the designated site.

Dalvir Singh and his relief troops fought for 2 days and extricated the beleaguered SF team of 74 along with its 6 casualties, fighting their way out of the militants' cordon, to the safety of the Palay military headquarters.

Dalvir Singh was awarded Vir Chakra for volunteering and successfully rescuing his soldiers, and for displaying conspicuous courage and valiant leadership in the face of strong militant opposition, as per his award citation.

=== Higher Command ===
After leading operations in Sri Lanka as a Commanding Officer, Dalvir Singh also served as Brigade Commander (Field & CI), Sub Area Commander (J&K), Deputy. Director General (Special Ops), Division Commander in OP Rakshak & OP Parakram. He also commanded the elite 52 SAG of National Security Guards, as well as the Counter Insurgency Kilo Force of Rashtriya Rifles which handle Kupwara, Baramulla and Srinagar regions. He also headed India's Territorial Army as its Additional Director General.

Dalvir Singh is also credited as one of the core officers who set up and modernized the training strategies for National Security Guards. He is also credited for raising the training standards of the Territorial Army (India) while he served as its Additional Director General.

Rank Insignia of a Major General of the Indian Army

Dalvir Singh finally retired at the rank of Major General even though he was approved for the rank of Lieutenant General, for personal reasons in 2004.

== Post Military Career ==
Dalvir Singh, after his retirement from active military service, raised the Commando Training division under Rajasthan Police Training Centre in 2007. He has been serving as its Director Training since then. He also raised Thar Falcons, an anti-terror police unit, and under his tutelage, they got selected for guarding Cairn India Oil Field in Barmer, Rajasthan.

== Honours and decorations ==
=== Vir Chakra Citation ===
CITATION

Lieutenant Colonel Dalvir Singh

Lieutenant Colonel Dalvir Singh, Commanding Officer, 10 Para Commando was deployed in Sri Lanka as part of the Indian Peace Keeping Force. He launched his team of para commandos to hit the militants' headquarters in the heart of Jaffna town, for searching the defence, preliminary to the final assault. As the militants were very strong, the link-up of our forces with the para commandos was not successful. The officer volunteered to move with columns of infantry and armour to the objective area, to establish contact with the para commandos and, with utter disregard to his own danger, led his team to the objective in the face of heavy militant fire. He extricated the commando team, along with its casualties, fighting his way out of the militants' cordon to safety.

Lieutenant Colonel Dalvir Singh thus displayed conspicuous courage and valiant leadership in the face of strong militant opposition.

Dalvir Singh was also awarded the Vishisht Seva Medal in 1998 for commanding the 52 SAG of the National Security Guards with distinction, and the Ati Vishisht Seva Medal in 2002 for successfully commanding the Kilo Force.

Dalvir Singh was also honoured with the Mirza Raja Jai Singh I Award by the Maharaja Sawai Man Singh II Museum Trust, for his distinguished service in the Indian Armed Forces. The annual event is held on the occasion of the birth anniversary of Brigadier Maharaja Sawai Bhawani Singh Maha Vir Chakra of Jaipur who incidentally was also once the Commanding Officer of Dalvir Singh's parent unit, the 10th Battalion Special Forces.

== See also ==
- Jaffna University Helidrop
- Special Forces of India
- Special Protection Group

== Bibliography ==
- Gen. P. C. Katoch, Saikat Datta, (2013). India's Special Forces: 1: History and Future of Special Forces. VIJ Books (India) Pty Ltd. ISBN 9789382573975
- Col. Anil Kaul, (2006). Better Dead Than Disabled. Parity Paperbacks. ISBN 9788188888085
- Col. V S Yadav, (2012) Employment of Special Forces: Challenges and Opportunities for the Future. Centre for Joint Warfare Studies (New Delhi). ISBN 9789381411698
- Depinder Singh, (1992) The IPKF in Sri Lanka. Trishul Publications. ISBN 9788185384054
- Raj K. Mehta (2010) Lost Victory- The Rise & Fall of LTTE Supremo, V. Prabhakaran. Pentagon Security International. ISBN 9788182744431
- Stephen Heynes (2016) The Bleeding Island-Scars and Wounds. Partridge Publishing India. ISBN 9781482874785
- Sumit Walia (2021) Unbattled Fears: Reckoning the National Security. Lancer Publishers & Distributors. ISBN 9788170623311
