= Jaffna University Helidrop =

1987 Indian special operation

Jaffna Helidrop
- Part of Operation Pawan
Date	11 – 12 October 1987
Location	Jaffna Peninsula, Sri Lanka
Result	LTTE victory

Belligerents
India; Sri Lanka	Liberation Tigers of Tamil Eelam

Commanders and leaders
Rajiv Gandhi; R.I.S. Kahlon	Velupillai Prabhakaran

Units involved
Indian Armed Forces; Indian Peace Keeping Force; Indian Army; 10th Para Commando; 13th Sikh Light Infantry; 65th Armoured Regiment; Indian Air Force; No. 109 Helicopter Unit, IAF; No. 107 Helicopter Unit, IAF; No. 112 Helicopter Unit, IAF; Sri Lanka Armed Forces; Sri Lanka Air Force	Unknown

Strength
120 commandos of 10th Para Commando; 360 soldiers of 13th Sikh Light Infantry; 3 T-72 tanks 1 SLAF Bell 212 gunship	Unknown

Casualties and losses
6 killed 10th Para Commando; 30 killed 1 captured 13th Sikh Light Infantry	Unknown

The Jaffna University Helidrop was the first of the operations launched by the Indian Peace Keeping Forces (IPKF) aimed at disarming the Liberation Tigers of Tamil Eelam (LTTE) by force and capturing the city of Jaffna, Sri Lanka, in the opening stages of Operation Pawan during the Indian intervention in the Sri Lankan Civil War. Mounted on the midnight of 12 October 1987, the operation was planned as a fast heliborne assault involving Mi-8's of the No.109 Helicopter Unit, the 10th Para Commandos and a contingent of the 13th Sikh Light Infantry. The aim of the operation was to capture the LTTE leadership at Jaffna University building which served as the Tactical Headquarters of the LTTE, which was expected to shorten Operation Pawan, the battle for Jaffna. However, the operation ended disastrously, failing to capture its objectives due to intelligence and planning failures. The heli-dropped force suffered significant casualties, with nearly the entire Sikh LI detachment of twenty-nine troops, along with six Para commandos, killed in action.

== Background ==
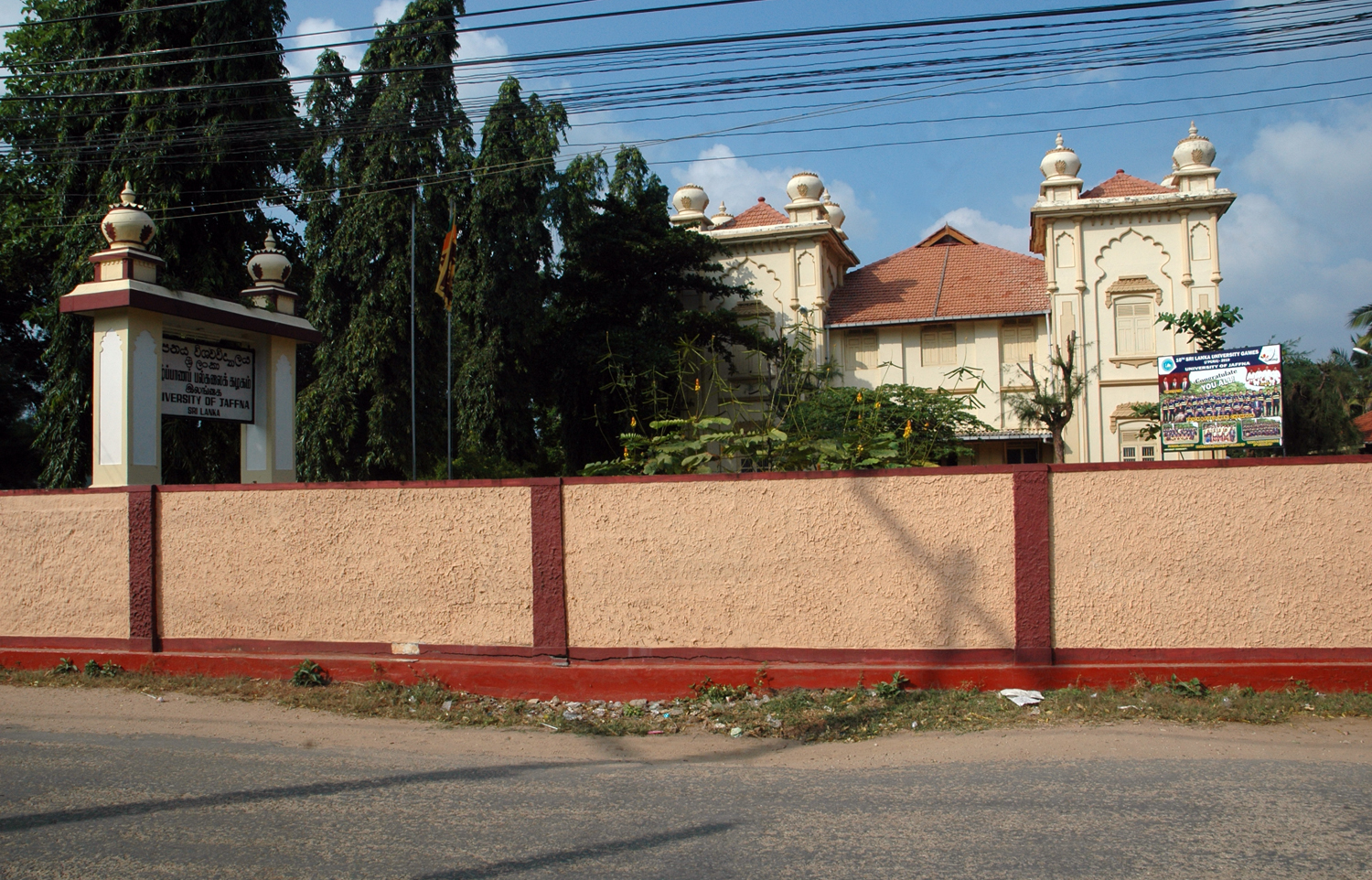
Jaffna University

=== An uneasy truce ===
The signing of the Indo-Sri-Lankan accord on 29 July 1987 brought a temporary truce to the Sri Lankan Civil War. Under the terms of the agreement, Colombo agreed to a devolution of power to the provinces, Sri Lankan troops were to withdraw to their barracks in the north, and the Tamil rebels were to disarm. Also, on the request of President J. R. Jayewardene, India was to send a contingent, the IPKF, to Northern Sri Lanka as a peacekeeping force.

The LTTE, who had enjoyed support from India till then however, agreed to the truce only reluctantly. The Tigers had rejected the Provincial Council framework as inadequate and Prabhakaran had protested against the Indian military intervention. The Tigers resisted the spread of what was deemed India's self-serving aim of binding Sri Lanka into India's geopolitical sphere of influence, as well as a sympathy for Sri Lanka's ruling Sinhala community in India outside the support-base in Tamil Nadu. With the induction of the Indian troops, the Tigers initially complied by surrendering arms along the terms of the truce. However, the LTTE boycotted the elections that were held in October and November 1988 along the lines outlined in the accord. The opposition to the induction of Indian troops soon flared into active confrontation. The Indian administration had not expected opposition from the Tigers and was initially taken by surprise. The support for Tamil Nationalism in India also raised the spectre to the Indian Govt. of a possible situation of Tamil secessionist movement in Tamil Nadu However, faced with growing diligence from its erstwhile partner, India adopted a strategy of aiding alternative Tamil power bases, including the Eelam People's Revolutionary Liberation Front, which had emerged strongly in the November 1988 elections, and at the same time continue negotiations with the LTTE.

=== Peace by any means ===
The incident that marked the turning point of Indo-LTTE relationship occurred in early October. On 4 October 1987, the Sri Lankan Navy captured an LTTE Sea Tigers boat off Point Pedro with seventeen Tigers, including some high-profile leaders of the movement, on board. The Colombo government alleged the boat was involved in smuggling arms across the Palk Strait and on the grounds denied immunity to these captured Tiger separatists. The LTTE denied this claiming the separatist's movement were in accordance with the truce, being in the process of transferring documents for shifting the Tigers Headquarters from Madras to Jaffna. The Sri Lankan government intended to bring a number of the separatists captured, including Pulendran, Kumarappa and others, to trial in Colombo for allegedly masterminding the massacre of a hundred and fifty civilians. The Tigers, who were at the time still in negotiation with the Indian authorities, appealed for enforcement of protection by the IPKF. The rebels were at this time in IPKF custody at Palali Airbase pending transfer to Sri Lankan authorities. Although the Indian authorities insist that they had explained the possible repercussions of such an action on the fragile truce and exerted considerable pressure on the Sinhalese authorities to desist from proceeding, ultimately the IPKF withdrew allowing the Sri Lankan forces to proceed with transferring the captured rebels to Colombo. The detainees however, attempted mass suicide by swallowing cyanide- a common LTTE practice when faced imminent capture. The night of 5 October saw large scale slaughter of Sri Lankan people who had returned to Jaffna, including eight troops of the Sri Lankan Army who were at the time being held hostages by the LTTE. These coincided by armed confrontations between the Tiger cadres and the Indian troops in and around Jaffna. On 8 October, the LTTE carried out a number of mortar attacks and ambushes on the IPKF. The deterioration of the situation put the Indian government into a position of having to enforce peace in Jaffna by force. The Indian government had already been accused of inaction in the face of a failing accord. It was declared on 9 October that the IPKF was to launch a terminal campaign against the LTTE.

== Prelude ==
The Indian intelligence reports received on 10 October indicated that a Tigers' meeting was to be held at Kokkuvil in the Jaffna University campus on the night of 11 October. Intelligence further indicated the meeting was to be attended by a number of high-profile Tiger leaders, including Velupillai Prabhakaran, Gopalaswamy Mahendraraja (alias Mahattaya), as well as the LTTE local commanders. The Indian Army was aware even before this that the LTTE had been using the university as their operational headquarters. The Indian forces had already prepared for a Special Helicopter Borne Operation against Jaffna University. With these reports, General Harikat Singh- GOC 54 Infantry Division, decided to use the window offered by this meeting to capture the LTTE leadership—a move that was expected to leave the rebel movement directionless in the face of the impending assault on the LTTE strongholds by the IPKF.

The final plan tasked a hundred and twenty commandos from the 10th Para Commando group and three hundred and sixty troops from the 13th Sikh Light Infantry for the mission. The Para Commandos and the delta company of 13 Sikh LI were to be heli-dropped into the University Football ground in three waves of four helicopters. The rest of the Sikh LI contingent was to advance on the ground to link up with the heliborne troops. To minimise exposure to ground-fire, fast-roping was ruled out and the decision was made to assign the first wave of the Paras with the additional responsibility as pathfinders to mark the drop-zone. The operation was to use four Mi-8s flying from Palay airfield, two from the No. 109 Helicopter Unit, and one each from the No. 107 Helicopter Unit and the No. 112 Helicopter Unit. The Mi-8s had provisions for fitting rocket pods; this was deemed not necessary since the IPKF did not anticipate any significant resistance from the ground. A Sri Lankan Air Force Bell 212 gunship was detailed to carry out a diversionary strike west of the drop-zone across the railway tracks, which the Indian troops were under strict orders not to exceed.

On the morning of 11 October, a reconnaissance flight over the university however revealed that the football field- the designated drop-zone- may be unable to accommodate four helicopters in a single wave. Holding off outside the drop zone in the face of expected hostile fire was ruled out and a change in the plans saw the decision made to divide each wave into two flights of a pair of Mi-8s. The second flight was to leave Palay Airfield - about four minutes flying time from the drop zone- only after the first flights had started on their return leg after disembarkation of their contingent. The whole operation was expected to last for ninety minutes.

== Operation ==
Unknown to the Indian intelligence, the Tigers had intercepted Indian radio communications, had advanced knowledge of the operation, and had correctly identified the landing ground. Jaffna University had been turned into a fortress. Several 50 calibre machineguns had been moved to the north of the football field, and Tiger cadres had laid an ambush for the Indian troops.

=== First insertion - The Bravo Team, 10 Para Commando ===
The operation H-Hour was set at midnight of the 11th. Led by Major Sheonan Singh as the Team Commander of the Para Commandos along with Major Rajiv Nair and Captain Ranbir Bhadauria, the first stick of forty Para Commandos were inserted in the first flight of two Mi-8s. The helicopter formation, led by Wg Cdr Sapre and Sqn Ldr Vinayraj as number two, approached the drop zone in low visibility observing complete black-out. The flights had only their formation lights—situated on top of the tail boom—switched on. These were turned off as the flight entered its short finals. Because of this complete blackout, the direction of approach of the first flights was missed by the Tigers. The two helicopters therefore entered the landing ground unopposed. However, as the commandos disgorged and moved to take defensive positions, they were pinned down by sustained fire from the Tiger positions. Both Sapre and Vinayraj's flight came under fire as they took off on full power, but did not suffer any hits. Under heavy fire, the Para commandos were unable to mark the drop-zone in time for the next stick. As the second flight approached the drop zone, the pilots Flt Lt V Prakash and Sqn Ldr Duraiswami could identify the flashes of small arms fire and grenades. However, added to this, the tracers from the SLAF gunship detailed for the diversionary attack were also identified as groundfire. The pilots, unable to identify the drop zone after considerable efforts, aborted the mission. The paras on the ground were by this time nearly completely encircled by the Tigers.

By the time the first flight of the second wave—flown again by Sapre and Vinayraj—took off from Palali Airbase however, the Tigers had been able to identify the approach route and moved troops and heavy machine guns to the rooftop of a building north of the field. As Sapre and Vinayraj approached their target zone, the Tigers directed heavy and sustained machinegun fire to the choppers, aiming at the cargo-hold. As the heavy machine gun fire pierced the metal skin of the helicopters, at least one commando on Vinayraj's flight was hit and wounded badly. The pilots however, were able to land and drop their load. Under increasingly intense ground fire, they took off to head back to Palali.

As the Para commandos tried to hold their ground, waiting for the rest of the detail to reinforce, however, they came under sniper fire. The LTTE had already moved in snipers armed with telescopic sights, and as the battle raged, they were able to inflict casualties on the Paras trying to hold their ground.

However, Duraiswamy and Prakash, unable to identify the LG, had not commenced on their second flight. By the time the first flight of the second wave landed back at Palali, the paras numbered eighty instead of the preplanned hundred and twenty. The decision was made for the two flights to exchange pilots, with Sapre and Vinayraj as the flight leaders of both the flights.

=== Delayed insertion of Delta Company, 13 Sikh Light Infantry ===
As the pilots prepared to insert the first troops of the Delta company, 13th Sikh Light Infantry, the operation was delayed by twenty minutes. Later analysis would show this may have been due to the Sikh Light Infantry troops, who were infantrymen, not being aware of the embarkation routine of heliborne operations. Furthermore, the troop load of twenty had to be reduced to fifteen to accommodate the ammunition boxes for the troops.

The third shuttle departed with Wg Cdr Sapre leading and Sqn Ldr Duraiswami as No.2. Under intense fire from LTTE positions, the load of 40 paras and 15 Sikh LI along with the ammunition boxes unloaded. Sapre's Mi-8 was heavily damaged.

As the second shuttle came in for their insertion, however, they faced a new threat as the Tigers brought RPG fire to bear against the helicopters. Heavy machine gun fire also hit the helicopters.

Vinayraj's load of forty paratroopers quickly disembarked; however, although the Sikh LI troops from Prakash's flight disembarked without any problems, it seems that there was some delay in dislodging the ammunition boxes, which further delayed the return flight Under heavy ground fire, the Mi-8s limped home to Palali.

=== Aborting further insertions ===
As the heavily damaged choppers returned to Palali airbase, it became clear that further missions might be impossible. Sqn Ldr Vinayraj's helicopter had sustained significant damage. The undercarriage had been hit, the portside battery compartment cover was missing and the whole fuselage was peppered with bullet holes. Wg Cdr Sapre's Mi-8 returned with its hydraulic system damaged.

It was also evident that the Tigers had improved the organisation and accuracy of ground fire during the third run. The Indian helicopters also faced a possible situation of RPG fire. Although Duraiswami's and Prakash's Mi-8s were still serviceable, it would have been very risky to fly directly over LTTE battlements in order to drop another 30 more troops.

After great deliberation, the decision was made by the IAF Commander, Gp Capt. M.P Premi, to abort further drops by the helicopters. GOC 54 Div, Maj. Gen. Harkirat Singh, was informed by Gp. Capt. Premi about the situation, and told the Mi-8s were not in a position to carry out further troop insertions. As Maj Sheonan Singh, the battalion second in command with the Para Commandos, was informed that no more support was available, Sheonan asked the GOC for the plan of action. By this time, although 103 Para commandos were in position, only thirty Sikh LI troops had been inserted under the command of Major Birendra Singh, LTTE snipers had immediately picked off the Sikh Light Infantry radio by accurate gunfire. All messages that received were relayed via the Paras through hand-held short-range walkie-talkies. At the landing ground, the battle was so intense that in many cases the Indian troops were not able to see the LTTE snipers and attackers. Under heavy fire from all sides, and coming under sniper fire, the troops were under orders not to use heavy weapons. The Sikh Light Infantry, as well as the commandos, were in danger of getting bogged down.

Debating whether to scrub the mission and extract the troops, or to press on with the possibility of capturing the LTTE high command and in particular hunting down Prabhakaran, the decision was taken by Harikat Singh to instruct the Paras to stick to the operational plans previously set. The Paras would leave the LZ and hunt for the place where the LTTE leaders were supposed to be hiding, while the Sikh Light Infantry troops would be left behind to hold the LZ.

Although under intense fire and with few troops, Major Birendra Singh, leading the Delta Company, 13 Sikh Light Infantry, had earlier communicated to Sheonan Singh that he would prefer to hold the landing ground and wait for the rest of his company to arrive. As the battle progressed the Paras informed the Sikh Light Infantry of the turn of events. By this time, the Paras had already set off and had separated from the Sikh LI troops. Maj. Gen. Harkirat Singh would later claim that Birendra Singh had not dug in with his troops at the LZ, nor taken cover in the nearby buildings despite the Paras' advice. Over the course of their search, the Paras ran into a local Tamil professor at the polytechnic university who claimed to know the location of the Paras' targets. Taking the professor's son in law with them, the commandos were soon ambushed by 300-500 LTTE fighters. By daybreak, they had retreated to a couple of houses in the area and fortified themselves.

With all radio contact with the Sikh Light Infantry platoon lost and their fate unknown, the Paras' situation now became the major concern for all those in HQ 54 Div. As the morning progressed, GOC Maj. Gen. Harkirat Singh arrived in an Army HAL Chetak helicopter to carry out a personal reconnaissance of the situation, drawing heavy small arms fire from the ground. One bullet went clean through the floor and into the space between where Harkirat was sitting and the pilot.

=== Rescue ===
With the commandos still holding out, plans were put in place at the 54 Division to extricate them. Lt. Col. Dalvir Singh, leading a relief force consisting of a small group of SF commandos. On the way, he came across three T-72 tanks from the 65th Armoured Regiment, led by Major Anil Kaul and decided to collaborate with the tank troops to extricate his men. However, the LTTE had laid an IED field on the approach roads, through which the rescue team simply could not proceed.

It was at this point that the commander of the tank troop, Major Anil Kaul, devised an alternate route. Kaul was aware that the railway tracks of the Palaly-Jaffna rail line passed behind Jaffna university. Kaul decided to drive his tanks on the rail tracks. However, as the tanks fought their way in, passing through the narrow lanes, RPG fire hit his tank in the turret. The explosion sprayed splinters over his eye and arm and severed his wedding ring finger. He was put on morphine by his men.

Lt. Col. Dalvir Singh had to take over the command of both the SF troops as well as the tank troops from thereon, even though he had never operated a tank prior to that. The 4/5 Gorkhas and ground detachment of the 13 Sikh Light Infantry had linked up by this time. The besieged Para commandos were successfully extricated after 2 days of fighting by Lt. Col. Dalvir Singh and the rescue team.

Both Lt. Col. Dalvir Singh, as well as Major Anil Kaul, was awarded Vir Chakra for their courage and leadership.

=== Delta Company, 13 Sikh Light Infantry ===
Although the Para Commandos were successfully extricated, the fate of the Sikh Light Infantry remained largely unknown until recounted by Sepoy Gora Singh, who had been taken prisoner, and was later released. Through the night, the Sikh Light Infantry had progressively been annihilated. Birendra Singh and his Platoon Commander Subedar Sampuran Singh fell to enemy fire sometime in the morning. By 11:30 am on 12 October, Delta Company was down to three jawans surviving. When they ran out of ammunition, the three survivors attempted a bayonet charge. Two were killed by LTTE gunfire and the last man, Sepoy Gora Singh, was taken prisoner. When the Indian Army finally reached the area after a week of heavy fighting, they found the battlefield littered with pieces of Sikh Light Infantry's uniforms and equipment, along with thousands of .50 MG shells.

According to Singh, the dead Sikhs were stripped of their weapons, uniforms and equipment and their bare bodies laid out in a row at the nearby Buddhist Nagaraja Vihar temple. The corpses were burnt with a barrel of oil. The LTTE claimed to have tried to get in touch with the IPKF HQ at Palaly, but their efforts to get them collect the dead bodies were in vain. The bodies had started to decompose, and they had no option but to cremate them.

In total the Delta company lost 30 men killed in action, accounting for almost all of the Sikh LI casualties. The Para Commandos lost six men in the battle.

== Aftermath ==
Following the operation, the Indian Army awarded 10 gallantry medals. Major Birendra Singh of the Sikh Light Infantry was posthumously awarded the Vir Chakra on the Republic Day of 1988. Lt. Col. Dalvir Singh, the Commanding Officer of 10 Para SF who volunteered and led the rescue mission, was awarded Vir Chakra for "conspicuous courage and valiant leadership". Major Anil Kaul of the 65 Armoured Regiment, was also awarded the Vir Chakra for his actions, having lost his right eye and left hand. He retired from the army as a Colonel, having his career affected by his wounds. The lone survivor Sepoy Gora Singh was later promoted to the rank of Naik. Every year, on 11 October, 13 Sikh Light infantry conducts ardās after bhog of the Akhand Path in memory of the soldiers and officers of 13 Sikh Light infantry who were killed in the Jaffna University heli-drop.

== See also ==
- List of Sri Lankan Civil War battles
- Operation Poomalai
