= Dinesh Raghu Raman =

Indian Army Ashoka Chakra recipient (1978-2007)

Major Dinesh Raghu Raman AC
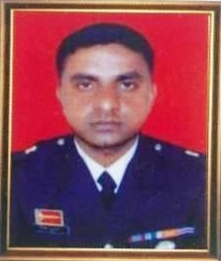
- Portrait of Maj Dinesh Raghu Raman
- Born: 6 April 1978; New Delhi, India
- Died: 2 October 2007 (aged 29); Baramulla, Jammu and Kashmir
- Education: Kendriya Vidyalaya, INA Colony; National Defence Academy
- Military career
- Allegiance: India
- Branch: Indian Army
- Service years: 1999-2007
- Rank: Major
- Service number: IC-59263W
- Units: 19 Jat Regiment Battalion; 34th Rashtriya Rifles (Jat) Battalion (deputation)
- Conflicts: 2001–2002 India–Pakistan standoff; Insurgency in Jammu and Kashmir †
- Awards: Ashoka Chakra: Operation Parakram Medal; Chief of Army Staff Commendation; Card

Major Dinesh Raghu Raman, AC was an Indian military officer with the 19th Battalion of the Jat Regiment who was posthumously awarded India's highest peacetime military decoration Ashoka Chakra.

== Early life ==
Major Dinesh Raghu Raman was born on 6 April 1978. His father was Honorary Captain SK Murthy and his mother was Mala. He completed his schooling from Kendriya Vidyalaya, INA Colony, New Delhi. He joined the prestigious National Defence Academy in 1996.

== Military career ==
He was commissioned to the 19 battalion of Jat Regiment as a lieutenant on 11 December 1999. Among his batchmates was fellow Ashoka Chakra recipient Mohit Sharma. He was promoted captain on 11 December 2003 and to major on 11 December 2005. In his short military career, he served in various appointments and was highly appreciated by his seniors for his leadership and dedication qualities. He did a stint in 42 Armoured Regiment during 2003-2004.He was also awarded the Chief of Army Staff Commendation medal for his contribution in Operation Parakram in Drass sector.

On 2 October 2007, he led an operation against terrorists in the Baramulla sector of Jammu and Kashmir. He heard the shouts of a fellow officer during the fire exchange and crawled towards him and two others amid the intense fire. Thereafter he killed two terrorists but sustained gunshot wounds in the process. He continued to lead his team forward until he fell unconscious. He was later airlifted to the Srinagar base hospital. For his bravery, he was posthumously awarded the Ashoka Chakra, the highest peacetime military decoration in India.

== Baramulla Operation ==
Maj Raman was delegated to serve with the 34 Rashtriya Rifles Battalion in the Jammu and Kashmir area in 2006 following service with his unit for a few years. Maj Raman led the highly successful “Op Narawar” operation in June 2007, which resulted in the elimination of three hardened terrorists in his area of command.

Maj Raman was tasked on October 2, 2007, with initiating an operation in a Baramulla area to ferret out militants hidden there. Maj Raman's crew was dispatched to the suspected region around 0820 hours on that day. Major Raman witnessed screams of a fellow officer who had been gravely hurt during the continuous altercation at 0855 hours, while closing in on suspected residences.

Maj Raman assessed the situation swiftly and rushed in the direction of his colleague's rescue. He moved towards the injured officer amid intense enemy fire, showing the highest level of camaraderie and esprit-de-corps. He then rescued him and two other wounded soldiers and transported them to a safer location. He then proceeded on to the two militants who had inflicted so many losses among the troops, and shot both of them dead in a vicious close combat battle. Other terrorists, meanwhile, were hiding in a nearby home and fired at Major Raman. This opened up a new front in the gunfight, and Maj Raman was critically injured in the ongoing exchange of fire. Undeterred, he continued leading and motivating his troops and pinned down the terrorists till he fell unconscious. Maj Raman was airlifted to the military hospital in Srinagar where he succumbed to his injuries. Maj Raman was a dedicated soldier and a fine officer who laid down his life in the service of the nation.

For his remarkable courage, camaraderie, fighting spirit, and tremendous sacrifice, Major Dinesh Raghu Raman was awarded the nation's highest peacetime gallantry honour, the "Ashok Chakra."

== Ashoka Chakra ==
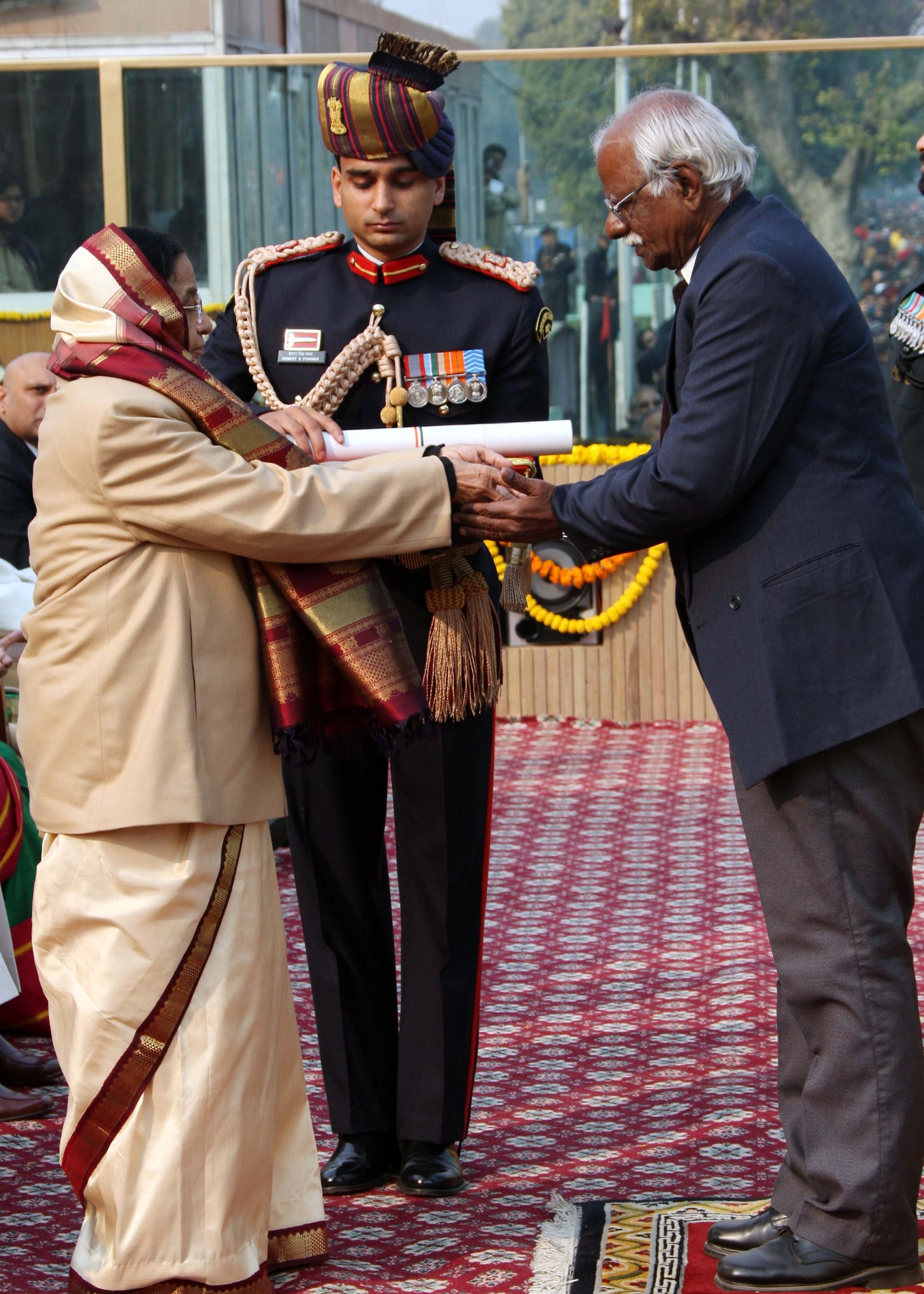
Dinesh Raghu Raman's father receives the Ashok Chakra from President Pratibha Patil on 26 January 2008.

The President of India noted in the Ashoka Chakra citation that Major Raman displayed most conspicuous bravery besides camaraderie and leadership of the highest order and made the supreme sacrifice for the nation.

The following is the Ashoka Chakra citation honouring Major Dinesh Raghu Raman's supreme sacrifice:

CITATION

DINESH RAGHU RAMAN

19th BATTALION (THE JAT REGIMENT)

On 02 October 2007, at 0820 hrs Major Dinesh Raghu Raman deployed his company in a village in Baramulla district of Jammu & Kashmir where an encounter with terrorists had commenced. At 0855 hrs, while closing in on suspected houses, Major Raman heard shouts of a fellow officer who had been seriously injured. Displaying camaraderie and esprit-de-corps of the highest order he crawled towards him under heavy hostile fire. He extricated him and two other injured soldiers to safety. He then took on two terrorist who had caused heavy casualties to the troops and in a fierce close quarter battle shot both of them dead. The other terrorists now fired on Major Raman from another house. In the ensuing firefight, Major Raman was seriously injured. Undeterred, he continued leading and motivating his troops and pinned down the terrorists till he fell unconscious. He later succumbed to his injuries.

— Gazette of India Notification,
