= Jojan Thomas =

Indian Army Ashoka Chakra recipient (1965–2008)

Colonel Jojan Thomas AC
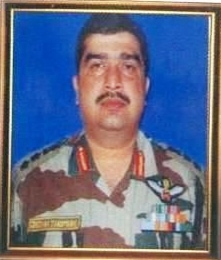
- Born: Jojan Thomas; 22 May 1965; Kuttoor Village, Thiruvalla District, Kerala
- Died: 22 August 2008 (aged 43); Kupwara district
- Burial place: Hosur Road Cemetery
- Spouse: Beena Jojan Thomas
- Children: 2
- Military career
- Allegiance: India
- Branch: Indian Army
- Service years: 1986-2008
- Rank: Colonel (India)
- Service number: IC-45618
- Unit: Jat Regiment Rashtriya Rifles
- Commands: Commanding Officer of 45 Rashtriya Rifles
- Awards: Ashok Chakra

Colonel Jojan Thomas, AC (22 May 1965 – 22 August 2008) was an Indian military officer with the Jat Regiment and later the 45 Rashtriya Rifles unit. He was a native of Kuttoor in Thiruvalla, Kerala and lived in Bangalore. He was commissioned from the Officers Training Academy, Chennai in March 1986. On 22 August 2008, he led an operation against terrorists in the forests of Macchal sector in the Kupwara district of Jammu and Kashmir. In the process, he killed three terrorists, but sustained several gunshot wounds and succumbed to injuries. For his bravery, he was posthumously awarded the Ashoka Chakra, the highest peace time military decoration in India.

== Early life ==
Colonel Jojan Thomas was born on 22 May 1965 in Kuttoor village of Thiruvalla in pathanamthitta District of Kerala. He was the son of an army officer Captain P.A Thomas and Aleyamma Thomas. He was eldest among his four siblings. His two brothers also serving in the Armed Forces. He came from a family with deep military background.

== Military career ==
He was commissioned in 11 Jat Regiment from the Officers Training Academy (OTA), Chennai on a short-service commission as a second lieutenant on 8 March 1986. Promoted lieutenant on 8 March 1988, he received a regular commission as a second lieutenant on 8 March 1991 (seniority for promotion from 6 November 1986) and was promoted lieutenant from the same date (seniority for promotion from 6 November 1988).

He was also a trained pilot and had served with Army Aviation corps for six years. Promoted captain on 6 November 1991, he was selected for the prestigious Staff Course for Officers in the Defence Services Staff College, Wellington, Tamil Nadu. On 6 November 1997, he was promoted to major, followed by promotion to lieutenant-colonel on 16 December 2004. He was sent to 45 Rashtriya Rifles to undertake anti terrorist operations in 2008.

== Ashoka Chakra awardee ==
For his bravery, self sacrifice and leadership in Kupwara Operation in 2008, he was posthumously awarded Ashoka Chakra, India's highest peacetime gallantry award.

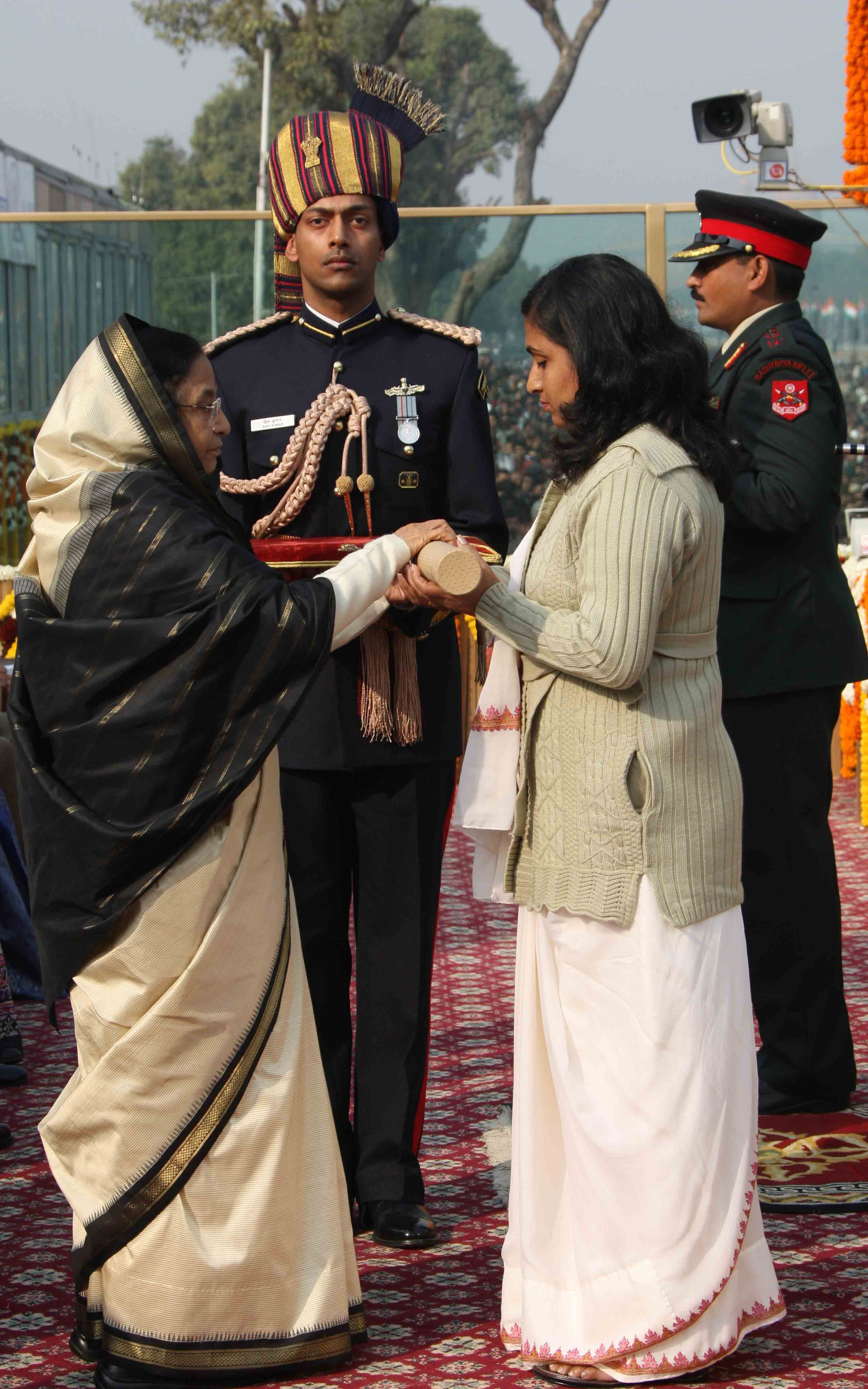
Jojan Thomas's widow receives the Ashok Chakra from president Pratibha Patil on 26 January 2009.
