= Rishabh Singh Sambyal =

Retired Indian Army officer

Major Rishabh Singh Sambyal
- Education: National Defence Academy; Indian Military Academy
- Military career
- Allegiance: India
- Branch: Indian Army
- Service years: 2014–2026
- Rank: Major
- Units: 4 Para (Special Forces); Jat Regiment

Major Rishabh Singh Sambyal is a retired Indian Army officer. He served with 4 Para (Special Forces) and as aide-de-camp to President Droupadi Murmu from March 2023 to August 2026.

As a captain, he led the Jat Regiment contingent at the Delhi Republic Day parade on 26 January 2021, which won the Best Marching Contingent Trophy.

== Early life and education ==
He is from Samba district, Jammu and Kashmir. He comes from a Dogra Rajput family with a military tradition. He studied at Sainik School Kapurthala. He cleared the National Defence Academy entrance examination in 2013 and joined the 133rd NDA course in 2014. He was commissioned into the Indian Army as a lieutenant in 2018. He was earlier known as Rishabh Singh. He changed his name to Rishabh Singh Sambyal in June 2023.

== Military career ==
He joined the Jat Regiment and then served with 4 Para (Special Forces), known as the Daggers. He earned the Balidaan Badge on completing Special Forces probation.

=== Aide-de-camp to the President ===
He was selected as an aide-de-camp to President Droupadi Murmu in March 2023 and served in the post for about three years. An aide-de-camp plans the President's appointments, is present at all ceremonies and liaises between the president and the government and military, living in a duty room next to the president on shifts from 9 am to 9 am the next day. Aides-de-camp follow a voluntary rule of not marrying during the tenure.

=== Public image ===
His appearances as aide-de-camp made him widely known on social media. Clips of him passing a handkerchief to the president and holding an umbrella over her in the rain went viral, and he was called a "national crush" online.

== Retirement and later life ==
He took premature retirement in late August 2026, at the age of 30, after about 12 years in the Army including training. His 12 years included three years at the National Defence Academy, one year at the Indian Military Academy and about eight years of commissioned service. He said the decision was for personal and family reasons and called it the hardest decision of his life. He denied online rumours that he was emigrating or marrying a foreigner.

On 21 August 2026, he met President Murmu at Rashtrapati Bhavan after his retirement. He spoke about his service in a long interview on Raj Shamani's Figuring Out podcast in September 2026.

After leaving the Army, he took up content creation and public speaking. In September 2026, he started a paid Instagram subscription at ₹199 a month, which had 2,476 subscribers by 18 September. His subscription divided opinion online. Some called it a downgrade for the Army. He replied: "Some see a downgrade. A soldier sees another way to serve."

In late October 2026, he launched a streetwear collection with Bonkers Corner. He had about 2.5 million Instagram followers as of October 2026. On 1 November 2026, he spoke to students at IIT Patna on leadership, AI and nation-building.
