= Siriththiran =

Siriththiran was popular monthly Tamil magazine published in Sri Lanka. It started publishing in 1963 in Colombo. Then it was shifted to Jaffna in 1971 and continued there until 1987. The founder and first editor of the magazine was C. Sivanganasundaram. Also known as Siriththiran Sunthar among the Tamil literates, he started his career as a cartoonist.

Siriththiran stopped publishing during the 1987 war between the Liberation Tigers of Tamil Eelam and the Indian Peace Keeping Force and started again in Jaffna during the 1990s and continued until 1995. The magazine has released 318 volumes. It contained stories, short stories, novels, and cartoons.

From the beginning, the magazines were printed at Suthanthiran Printers located in Bandaranayake Street in Colombo. Then, in 1970 it was shifted to Kumaran Printers located in St. Benedict Street. In 1971, it started printing in Sri Lanka Printers located at 67, Brown Street, Jaffna. In 1974 it was shifted to Navalar Street.

Mr Suresh Kanapathi acquired the right to publish the Magazine in 2020 as part of his effort to bring back history, as he was interested in museum related projects. Siriththiran was relaunched in January 2021 by Mr Suresh Kanapathi. Publication was stopped again in 2022 due to COVID19 and management in Jaffna left. It now continues again from January 2023 as E Magazine and it will continue as printed and e magazine as it management says. It is not new for Siriththiran Magazine to face many challenges since its launch in 1963. The non-profit organisation Centre for Creativity and Innovation, based in Jaffna, publishes the magazine.
