= Vikramjit Singh Rooprai =

Indian author and educationist (born 1983)

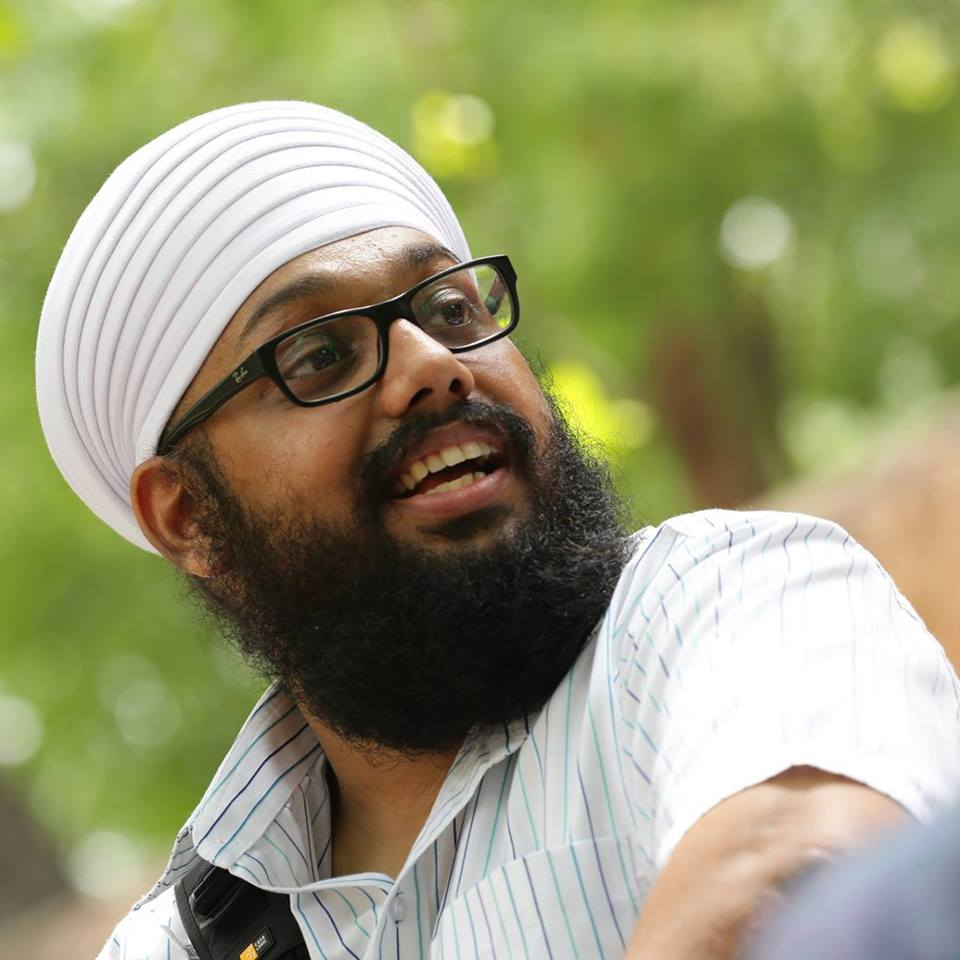
- Born: 10 February 1983 (age 43); Manama, Bahrain
- Education: Sikkim Manipal University
- Occupations: Educator, Author, Historian
- Spouse: Maninder Pal Kaur
- Children: 2

Vikramjit Singh Rooprai (born 10 February 1983) is an Indian author, educator, and heritage activist. He started his career as a software engineer and later became a digital marketing consultant. He left his full time IT job in 2015, and became an educator, establishing heritage labs in schools and training teachers on how to use history to teach various subjects. His first book Delhi Heritage: Top 10 Baolis, dedicated to the stepwells of Delhi, is published by Niyogi Books.

== Early life and background ==
Vikramjit was born in Manama, Bahrain and has done most of his schooling from Delhi. He attended Green Fields Public School, Guru Harkrishan Public School and Shaheed Bishan Singh Memorial Sr. Sec. School before joining Department of Electronics and Accreditation of Computer Classes 'O' & 'A' Level. He dropped out of 'B' Level from Jagan Institute of Management Studies. Vikramjit won 20+ awards in information technology competitions organized by colleges and computer societies of India. He married Maninder Pal Kaur in 2008. They have two children.

== Career ==
=== Software and digital marketing ===
Vikramjit started developing professional software while in school. After dropping out of Department of Electronics and Accreditation of Computer Classes 'B' Level, he started working with Sirez Infosystems of Delhi as a Research Analyst. In 2006, he joined Digitas and was soon promoted to associate director (Research and Innovation). During his tenure in Digitas, Vikramjit applied for Bachelor of Science (IT) through distance education from Sikkim Manipal University. He later applied for and cleared Masters of Computer Applications from same university. Vikramjit started his own company in 2011, under the name Techno:Cats. He and his team was taken over by Arvato Services arm of Bertelsmann AG. He worked for arvato India till October, 2015, before turning into a full-time educationist and historian.

=== Heritage activism ===
In 2009, Vikramjit started his heritage exploration and named the project Didar-i-Dilli. He started with Monuments of Delhi, which later became the most accurate and reliable source of information on the monuments and rulers of Delhi. In 2010, Vikramjit established The Heritage Photography Club. In 2013, he started Heritage Talks at various monuments, which were later moved to India Habitat Centre. In 2014, he registered his Trust, Youth for Heritage Foundation and started large scale heritage promotion campaigns.

Vikramjit started promoting heritage through photography. He now conducts regular heritage walks and talks across the country including lectures in schools, colleges and universities. He has been on several panel discussions and debates on sensitive heritage issues. His Twitter Handle (@DelhiHeritage) has been listed as a specialized handle for historic trivia about Delhi.

=== As educationist ===
In January 2017, Vikramjit launched Heritageshaala, an education company setting up Heritage Labs in Schools and Colleges across India. Vikramjit is currently a visiting faculty member at the National Institute of Fashion Technology. He also trains teachers throughout India on Experiential Narrative Pedagogy. His company developed card and board games to teach school students. In 2021, Vikramjit received the Innovative Educator of the Year award by ScooNews.

=== As author ===
Vikramjit released his first book Delhi Heritage: Top 10 Baolis in August 2019, published by Niyogi Books. He claims it to be the first book dedicated to the stepwells of Delhi. He spent 5 years researching for the book and was able to obtain archival material from National Archives, Central Archaeological Library, ASI Photo Archives and IGNCA. He provided a list of all 32 stepwells in Delhi, recorded since the late 1800s. Out of these, top 10 were discussed in detail, along with 2 special mentions. Baolis covered in his book are:

- Kotla Feroz Shah Baoli
- Red Fort Baoli
- Ridge Baoli
- Hazrat Nizam-ud-Din Baoli
- Ugrasen ki Baoli (also spelled as Agrasen ki Baoli)
- Munirka Baoli
- Gandhak ki Baoli
- Purana Qila Baoli
- Rajon ki Baoli
- Loharheri Baoli
- Baoli of Meherban Agha's Mandi – Arab ki Sarai, Humayun's Tomb Complex
- Hafiz Dawood ki Baoli (also known as Dargah Khawaja Kaki ki Baoli), Mehrauli

The foreword was written by Sohail Hashmi and the book was launched by Sohail Hashmi and Narayani Gupta in Delhi.

Given his work on the stepwells of India, the Ministry of Culture (Govt of India) appointed him the curator for gallery on Stepwells of India, setup at the Red Fort, during the India Art, Architecture, and Design Biennale 2023. The event was inaugurated by the Indian Prime Minister, Narendra Modi on 8 December 2023, and Vikramjit conducted a curated tour for the PM in his gallery.
