= Desmond Hayde =

Indian Army officer

Brigadier Desmond Hayde MVC
- Born: 28 November 1926; Exeter, England
- Died: 25 September 2013 (aged 86); Kotdwara, Uttarakhand, India
- Cause of death: Skin cancer
- Burial place: Bareilly, Uttar Pradesh, India
- Military career
- Allegiance: Republic of India
- Branch: Indian Army
- Rank: Brigadier
- Unit: 3 Jat
- Conflicts: Indo-Pakistani War of 1965
- Awards: Maha Vir Chakra

Brigadier Desmond Hayde MVC (1926–2013) was an officer in the Indian Army. He was the commanding officer of the 3rd battalion of the Jat Regiment (3 Jat) in the Battle of Dograi during the Indo-Pakistani War of 1965. He led his battalion of 550 men and defeated an enemy force that was double the size of his own battalion. He was awarded the Maha Vir Chakra for his contribution in the war.

== Early life ==
Desmond Hayde was born on 28 November 1926 in Exeter, England. He was of Irish descent, and his father worked in the Indian Railways.

== Indo-Pakistan War of 1965 ==
As part of Operation Riddle, 3 Jat was initially ordered to breach the Ichhogil Canal, which ran for 8 kilometres inside Pakistan. The western side (the Lahore side) was lined with Pakistani concrete pillboxes that had overlapping arcs of fire. The Dograi township on the eastern bank of the Canal near the Grand Trunk road was captured by 3 Jat by 1100 hours on 6 September 1965. By 1200 hours on 6 September 1965, 3 Jat had captured the Batapore and Attokeawan localities on the west bank of the Canal despite stiff enemy opposition. It was for this action that Lt. Col. Hayde was awarded the Maha Vir Chakra. However, the battalion had to fall back as the other units detailed to support them in the offensive could not reach them in time due to a miscommunication. 3 Jat stood their ground alone until they were ordered to withdraw by brigade headquarters. The miscommunication error resulted in the removal of a major general from his post.

3 Jat then had to wait 2 weeks in defence at Santpura village in Pakistan before they were given orders to take Dograi, a town in the immediate vicinity of Lahore. By this time, the Pakistan Army had heavily fortified the town. On the night of 21 September 1965, during the impending attack on Dograi, Hayde made two demands of his men:

- Ek bhi aadmi pichhe nahin hatega! (Not a single man will turn back!)
- Zinda ya murda, Dograi mein milna hai! (Dead or alive, we have to meet in Dograi!)

3 Jat then marched 8 kilometres from their trenches to Dograi, where the Pakistan Army had entrenched itself. The Pakistani force consisted of 2 infantry battalions supported by a tank squadron. Hayde warned his men against retreating by saying "Even if all of you run away, I shall continue to stand on the battlefield alone". The battalion engaged in close quarter combat, and eventually captured Dograi. However, 86 troops of 3 Jat were killed. The Pakistani casualties were close to 300. The battle is known as the Battle of Dograi.

Hayde is also perhaps the only soldier to be painted by the famed M. F. Husain on the battlefield. It was during an address to his battalion later on 29 October in the same year in Pakistan that Prime Minister Lal Bahadur Shastri gave India one of its best known slogans: "Jai Jawan! Jai Kisan!" ("Victory to the soldiers! Victory to the Farmers!").

== Maha Vir Chakra Citation ==
The citation for the Maha Vir Chakra reads as follows

Gazette Notification: 125 Pres/65,17-9-65
Operation: 1965 Riddle
Date of Award: 06 Sep 1965

Citation:

On 6 September 1965, when the initial attack on the lchhogil Canal in Pakistan was launched, Lieutenant Colonel Hayde, commanding officer of a battalion of Jat Regiment, captured the western bank of the canal against very stiff enemy opposition. It was primarily due to his leadership that not only did his battalion not fall back from the positions which it had occupied, but in fact moved forward in spite of continuous and heavy shelling and frequent air and ground attacks. On 9 September, when the enemy launched an attack with Patton and Sherman tanks, his battalion accounted for five enemy tanks. The performance of this battalion throughout the operations was excellent and this was largely due to the great personal courage and exceptional qualities of leadership shown by Lieutenant Colonel Desmond Hayde.

== Later life ==
Hayde spent 30 years in the Indian Army before retiring as a brigadier in 1978 and then served as Inspector General in the Mizoram Police till 1984. He then moved to Kotdwar in Uttarakhand, his wife's hometown. He set up the ex-servicemen league in Kotdwar and readily helped former members of the Jat Regiment. He donated some land upon which a school (now named Hayde Heritage Academy) was built in Kotdwar. He also adopted many stray dogs.

== Personal life ==
Hayde married Sheila, a Garhwali from Kotdwar in what was then Uttar Pradesh, but is now in Uttarakhand. He met her when he was a young officer in Bareilly. They had three sons, Walter Hayde, Michael Hayde and Norman Hayde. Walter lived in Canada until his death on March 8, 2017. Walter and his wife, AnnaRita have three children. Their first daughter is Elizabeth, she has a son named Eric. Their second daughter is Jennifer, she has a son named Joseph. The youngest daughter is Michelle. Michael joined the Indian Army and retired as a lieutenant colonel and currently resides in England. Michael is married to Susan and they have two children, Debbie and Jason. Norman, the youngest son died in October 2024, and his wife Marina and their two children, David and Daniel, continue to live in Reading.

== Death ==
Brigadier Hayde died of skin cancer on 25 September 2013 in Kotdwar. He was buried alongside his wife in Bareilly cantonment, near the Jat Regimental Centre.

== Legacy ==
The Hayde Heritage Academy, Kotdwara, a school founded by him on the land donated by him, was renamed in his honor.
