= Jat Regiment =

Regiment in the Indian Army

- Regimental Insignia of The Jat Regiment
- Active: 1795 – present
- Country: British India (1795–1947); India (1947–present)
- Allegiance: India
- Branch: British Indian Army (1795–1947); Indian Army (1947–present)
- Type: Line Infantry
- Role: Infantry
- Size: 29 Battalions; 23 Regular Infantry Battalions; 4 Rashtriya Rifles Battalions and 2 Territorial Army Battalions
- Regimental Centre: Bareilly, Uttar Pradesh
- Motto: Sangathan Va Veerta (Unity And Valour)
- War Cry: Jāt Balwān, Jai Bhagwān (The Jat is powerful, Victory to the Lord!)
- Anniversaries: 20 Nov
- Decorations: 24 (19 Battle Honours between 1839 and 1947, 5 post-independence); 2 Ashoka Chakra; 1 Victoria Cross; 2 George Cross; 11 Kirti Chakra; 8 Maha Vir Chakra; 3 Military Medal; 53 Shaurya Chakra; 38 Vir Chakra; 343 Sena Medal

Commanders
- Colonel of the Regiment: Lt Gen Rajesh Sethi, AVSM SM VSM
- Notable commanders: Lt Gen Satinder Kumar Saini; Lt Gen B. S. Raju

The Jat Regiment is an infantry regiment of the Indian Army, of which it is one of the longest-serving and most decorated regiments. The regiment has won 19 Battle Honours between 1839 and 1947, and post-independence it has won five Battle Honours, including 2 Ashok Chakra, 1 Victoria Cross, 2 George Cross, 11 Kirti Chakra, 8 Mahavir Chakra, 3 Military Medal, 53 Shaurya Chakras, 38 Vir Chakras and 343 Sena Medals. During its 200-year service history, the regiment has participated in various actions and operations in India and abroad, including the First and the Second World Wars.

== History ==
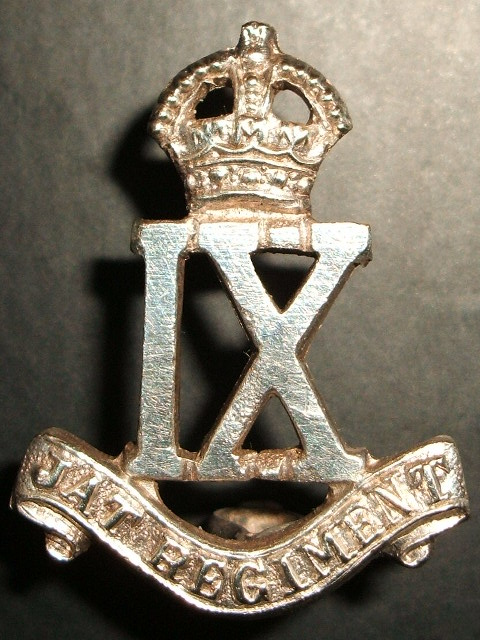
The Jat Regiment Insignia during British India (Pre-1947)

The Regiment claims its origins from the Calcutta Native Militia, that was raised as a garrison unit for local guard duties in 1795, which later became an infantry battalion of the Bengal Army. Following the Indian Rebellion of 1857, many of the units of the Bengal Army were disbanded. Jats from the areas of today's western Uttar Pradesh and areas around Delhi were recruited to put down the Gurjar rebellion towards the end of 1857 and the beginning of 1858. After 1860, there was a substantial increase in the recruitment of Jats into the British Indian Army. From 1892, there was a move to convers infantry battalions to pure class/caste composition battalions. Two battalions of Hindu Jats - the 6th (Jat) Regiment of Bengal (Light) Infantry and 10th Jat Infantry Regiment were formed from the 6th Bengal Infantry and 10th Bengal Infantry. Following World War I, there was an expansion in the number of battalions and both the regiments raised an additional battalion. Following the war, the composition of the Jat regiments were changed to 50% Hindu Jats, 25% Punjabi Mussalmans and 25% Rajput Mussalmans.

A World War I (1914–1918) Jat Army Officer's Brass Button

Following the reorganisation of 1922, the 9th Jat Regiment was formed by merging four active battalions and one training battalion into a single regiment. The oldest battalion joining the Regiment was the 18th Infantry Regiment, which traced its unbroken history to the Calcutta Native Militia, raised in 1795. The prefix 9th came from this battalion, which was ninth in the seniority of raising of still surviving battalions raised by the East India Company.

The new Jat Regiment received Muslim troops from the disbanded 5th Light Infantry and 17th Loyal Infantry Regiment in January 1922. 2/6 Royal Jat LI, which was raised from within 6 Jat (LI) was designated the training battalion and the depot and started functioning in Bareilly from 1 January 1922. Troops from 1/6 Royal Jat LI, 2/6 Royal Jat LI and 10th Jats were distributed to the two other new battalions. The fifth Battalion of the Regiment was raised by amalgamating elements of two disbanded battalions of the Bombay Army, the 2nd and 3rd/150th Infantry Regiment, and adding troops from the 6th Jat Light Infantry. 119 Infantry Regiment (Mooltan) of the erstwhile Bombay Army formed the 2nd battalion. Its class composition was 50% Meo Rajputs from Rajputana and the balance being Hindu Gurjars and Muslims from the Deccan and the United Provinces. Since its class composition was different from the 9th Jat Regiment, all the existing personnel were posted out and troops from 21 different units were posted-in to form a composition of 50% Hindu Jats and 25% Muslim Rajputs (Ranghars), and 25% Punjabi Muslims.

The reorganisation plan included raising one territorial battalion for protection of home territories, the first TA battalion was raised in Meerut on 11 March 1922 as the 11th Bn/9th JAT Regiment, Indian Territorial Force. By mid 1924, the organisation stabilised with the presence of three regular, one TA and one training battalion. In 1930, two battalions of the Grenadiers were added to the Regiment and the 10th Training Battalion of the 9th Jat Regiment was renamed the 10th Battalion, 4th/9th Regiments. With World War II, there was an expansion of the army and training of recruits for the Grenadiers was moved out of Bareilly on 15 July 1941 to Nasirabad. The Jat Centre reverted to its old designation of the 10th Battalion, the 9th Jat Regiment. During the war, the TA battalion converted to a regular battalion and designated as 7/9 Jat. New units of were raised between July 1940 and August 1943 (4th, 5, 6, 8, 9, 11, 12, 14, 15 as active battalions, 25, 26 and 27 Garrison battalions, and a Machine Gun battalion). Most of them were disbanded after the war between March and December 1946. Vide the Indian Army Order number 134/S/45, the prefixed numeral of 'Ninth' was dropped of on 28 November 1945 and the regiment was designated simply as "The Jat Regiment". Post partition, the Muslim troops left for the newly formed Pakistani army (to the 16th Punjab Regiment and Frontier Force Regiment); with the Jat Regiment taking in Hindu Jat troops from the Punjab Regiments (mainly the 15th Punjab Regiment) allotted to Pakistan.

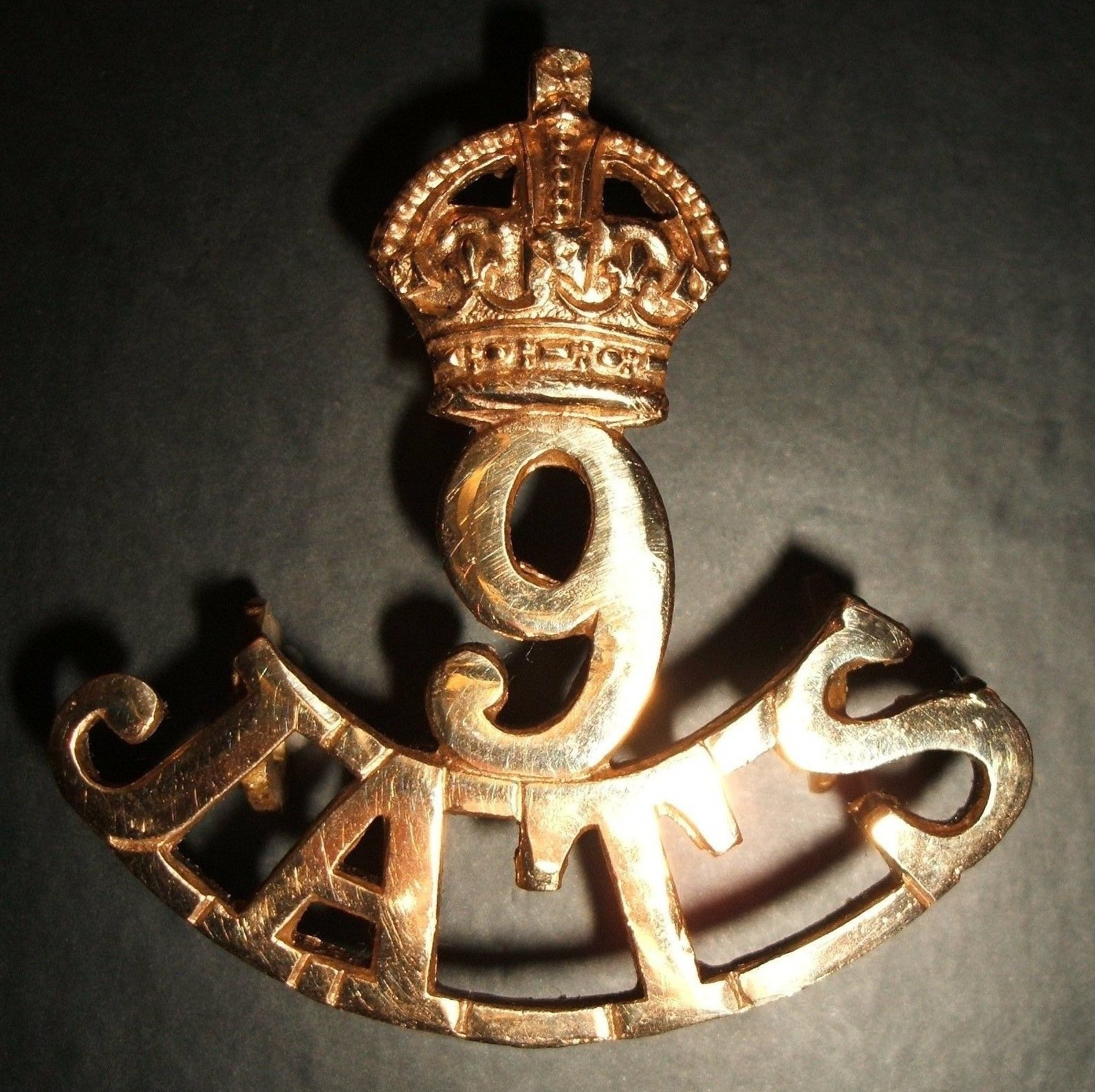
Pre-independence shoulder title of the Jat regiment

== Composition and recruitment ==
Soldiers of the Jat Regiment are recruited predominantly from the Hindu Jat community of Northern India (89%) and the rest from Sikh Jats. These Jats are from Haryana, Rajasthan, Delhi, and Uttar Pradesh, with the exception of three battalions whose ethnic make-up is as follows -

- 12 Jat – All India All Class battalion
- 15 Jat – This battalion recruits from Ahirs, Jats, Gujars and Rajputs - four classes with a common heritage.
- 20 Jat - This was raised as a mixed class composition of Jats, Dogras, Garhwalis, and Marathas following the mutiny by single class regiments in 1984. Between 1998 and 1999, the battalion reverted to being a 100% Jat unit.

Under the Agnipath Scheme, recruitment from other classes would happen.

== Regimental insignia and traditions ==
Regimental Crest and uniform

The regimental insignia presently consists of The Roman numeral nine representing its ninth position in the regimental hierarchy of the Indian Army of the 1920s. It is surmounted by the national emblem of India – the Ashoka lion capital (which replaced the crown after independence in 1954), while a scroll below bears the title 'Jat Regiment' in capitals. The insignia also has a bugle indicating the light infantry antecedents of two of its battalions, 1 and 2/6 Jat LI. The shoulder titles are in brass with the word 'Jat' in capitals. Prior to 1955, the shoulder titles had the words '9 Jats' in capitals mounted by the Tudor crown. The present uniform of the Jat Regiment includes a dark blue lanyard on the left shoulder.

Regimental motto and war cry

The motto of the regiment is Sangathan Va Veerta, which translates to Unity And Valour. The battle cry, adopted in 1955, in Hindi, is जाट बलवान, जय भगवान (IAST: Jāt Balwān, Jai Bhagwān) (The Jat is Powerful, Victory Be to Lord!).

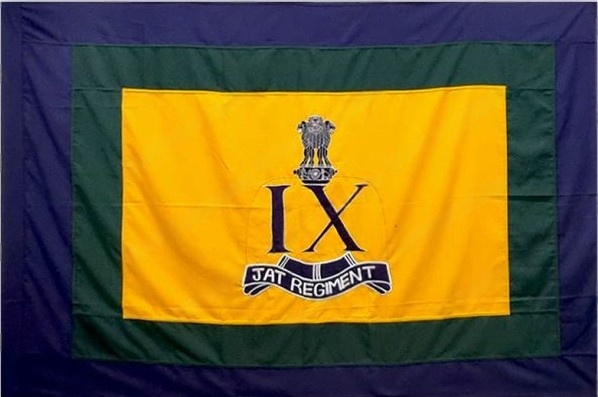
Flag of Jat Regiment

Regimental Colours

The regimental colours - blue, yellow and green represent the colours of the flags of 3rd, 2nd and 1st battalions of the Jat Regiment respectively.

Mauji Ram

In the 1920s, when the offices of the Eastern Command headquarters were moving from the winter headquarters in Lucknow to its summer headquarters in Nainital, the GOC-in-C of Eastern Command, General Sir George de Symons Barrow and his wife Sybilla Barrow halted en route at Bareilly. Sybilla Barrow who wanted to draw an ideal young Jat, painted the Subedar Major of the Jat Regimental Centre - Mauji Ram and made another one as she imagined how he would have looked as a young recruit. These paintings are now displayed at the Jat Regimental Centre, Bareilly. Subedar Major (Honorary Captain) Mauji Ram's image is an iconic symbol and is often displayed as a regimental symbol.

== The Jat Regimental Centre ==
The Jat Regimental Centre is located in Bareilly in Uttar Pradesh. It traces its origins to the raising of Calcutta Native Militia on 10 July 1795. It went through the following changes - 1859 - The Alipore Regiment, 1861 - 22nd Regiment of Bengal Native Infantry (on conversion to Infantry of the line), 1861 - 18th Regiment of Bengal Native Infantry, 1864 - 18th (The Alipore) Regiment of Bengal Native Infantry, 1885 - 18th Regiment of Bengal Infantry, 1902 - 18th Musalman Rajput Infantry, 1903 - 18th Infantry, 1922 - 10th Bn, the 9th Jat Regiment (along with 2nd Bn, 6th Jat Light Infantry Regiment and elements of 1/50th Kumaon) as the Training Centre, 1923 - Amalgamation with the elements of the disbanded 4th Bn, the 9th Jat Regiment, with the Training Battalion receiving the identity and seniority of the 18th Infantry, 1930 - 10th Bn, the 4th/9th Regiments (Combined training centre of the 4th Bombay Grenadiers and the 9th Jat Regiment), 1941 - 10th Bn, the 9th Jat Regiment (after the demerger of 4th Bombay Grenadiers’ training companies), 1942 - Regimental Centre, the 9th Jat Regiment and finally in 1945 as The Jat Regimental Centre.

== Regimental battalions ==
The Jat Regiment has 27 Battalions including 21 regular infantry battalions, 4 Rashtriya Rifles battalions and 2 Territorial Army battalions, as of August 2020. -

Unit	Raising location	Raising date	Remarks	References
Jat Regimental Centre	Calcutta	1795	Erstwhile The Calcutta Native Militia	
1 Jat (LI)	Fatehgarh	9 November 1803	Raised as 1st Battalion, 22nd Regiment of Bengal Native Infantry, 1824 - 43rd Regiment of Bengal Native Infantry, 1843 - 43rd Regiment of Bengal Native (Light) Infantry, 1861 - 6th Regiment of Bengal Native (Light) Infantry, 1885 - 6th Regiment of Bengal (Light) Infantry, 1897 - 6th (Jat) Regiment of Bengal (Light) Infantry, 1901 6th Jat Light Infantry, 1921 - 6th Royal Jat Light Infantry, 1922 united with 119th Infantry (The Mooltan Regiment), 10th Jats, and 18th Infantry, to form 1st Bn, 9th Jat Regiment. Given the title 'Light Infantry' in 1842 and 'Royal' in 1921. Converted to 2 Mechanised Infantry Regiment in 1981. Battle honours - Nagpore, Afghanistan, Candahar 1842, Ghuznee 1842, Cabul 1842, Maharajpore, Sobraon, Ali Masjid, Afghanistan 1878-79, China 1900 and Afghanistan 1919.	
2 Jat	Bombay	29 October 1817	Raised as 1st Bn, 10th Regiment of Bombay Native Infantry, 1824 - 19th Regiment of Bombay Native Infantry, 1885 - 19th Regiment of Bombay Infantry, 1901 - 19th Bombay Infantry, 1903 - 119th Infantry (The Mooltan Regiment), 1922 - 2nd Bn (The Mooltan Bn), the 9th Jat Regiment, 1945 - 2nd Bn (Mooltan), the Jat Regiment. Battle honour Rajouri.	
3 Jat	Dinapore	23 June 1823	Raised as 1st Bn, 33rd Regiment of Bengal Native Infantry, 1824 - 65th Regiment of Bengal Native Infantry, 1861 - 10th Regiment of Bengal Native Infantry, 1885 - 10th Regiment of Bengal Infantry, 1897 - 10th (Jat) Regiment of Bengal Infantry, 1901 - 10th Jat Infantry, 1903 - 10th Jats, 1922 - 3rd Bn, the 9th Jat Regiment, 1945 - 3rd Bn, the Jat Regiment. Battle honours Zoji La and Dograi.	
4 Jat	Bareilly	15 January 1962	First raising July 1795 at Calcutta. Amalgamated with the 10th Training Battalion in 1922. Reraised 15 July 1940 at Jhelum. Disbanded after surrender at Singapore on 14 February 1942. Re-raised by Lieutenant Colonel Amar Singh, nicknamed Saviours of Fazilka.	
5 Jat	Varanasi	1 February 1941	Raised by Lieutenant Colonel WM Morgan MC as 5th Bn, the 9th Jat Regiment. Theatre honour Burma, Rajouri, Ladakh and Punjab, and battle honour Phillora. Nicknamed Phillora Captors.	
6 Jat	Bareilly	1 February 1941	Raised by Lieutenant Colonel DA Brett GC, OBE, MC as 6th Bn, the 9th Jat Regiment. Nicknamed Gallant Sixth.	
7 Jat	Bareilly	15 November 1962	11th TA Battalion was converted to a regular battalion and named 7 Jat on 15 September 1940. Disbanded after World War II. Re-raised by Lieutenant Colonel Sangram Singh.	
8 Jat	Bareilly	14 December 1959	12th TA Battalion was converted to a regular battalion and named 8 Jat on 15 September 1941. Disbanded after World War II. Re-raised by Lieutenant Colonel Kushal Singh.	
9 Jat	Bareilly	1 January 1963	11th TA Battalion of 14th Punjab Regiment was converted to a regular battalion and named 9 Jat on 15 September 1941. Re-raised by Major KS Rawat.	
11 Jat	Bareilly	1 April 1964	Raised by Major BR Saharan.	
12 Jat	Bareilly	6 February 1970	Raised by Lieutenant Colonel Nand Lal as 31 Jat for counter-insurgency operations in the North East. Converted to a standard infantry battalion in 1972.	
14 Jat	Bareilly	1 October 1963	12th TA Battalion of 14th Punjab Regiment was converted to a regular battalion and named 9 Jat on 15 September 1941. Disbanded after World War II. Re-raised by Major Daljeet Singh.	
15 Jat	Bareilly	15 May 1976	25th Garrison Battalion raised in 1941 was converted to a regular battalion and named 15 Jat on 15 August 1943. Amalgamated with 2 Jat after World War II. Re-raised by Lieutenant Colonel JS Choudhary.	
16 Jat	Bareilly	1 October 1964	Raised by Major SS Hasabnis VSM, the first commanding officer was Lieutenant Colonel JN Sen. COAS unit citation in 2005 and 2011.	
17 Jat	Jabalpur	1 June 1966	Raised by Lieutenant Colonel PA Patole. Theatre honour Kargil and battle honour Mushkoh.	
18 Jat	Secunderabad	1 October 1966	Raised by Lieutenant Colonel Jagwant Singh Sindhu.	
19 Jat	Bareilly	1 August 1980	Raised by Lieutenant Colonel AS Reddy.	
20 Jat	Bareilly	27 February 1985	Raised by Colonel NS Gill.	
21 Jat	Bareilly	1 November 1987	Raised by Colonel AK Mehra	
22 Jat	Bareilly	1 December 2013	Raised by Colonel AK Butail. Nicknamed Jaguars.	
23 Jat	Bareilly	1 July 2016	Raised by Colonel TS Hothi.	
24 Jat	Bareilly	1 September 2020	Raised by Colonel JS Gill.	
5 Rashtriya Rifles	Ranikhet	15 October 1990	Raised by Colonel HC Sah.	
34 Rashtriya Rifles	Bareilly	1 September 1994	Raised by Colonel RJS Dhillon YSM, VSM. Bravest of the Brave.	
45 Rashtriya Rifles	Bareilly	1 July 2001	Raised by Colonel SD Mehta.	
61 Rashtriya Rifles	Bareilly	1 July 2004	Raised by Colonel Sanjeev Dogra.	
114 Infantry Battalion (Territorial Army)	Dehradun	1 October 1960	Raised by Lieutenant Colonel MS Sehgal.	
151 Infantry Battalion (Territorial Army)	Muzaffarpur	18 January 2001	Raised by Colonel AK Gupta.	

== Battle honours ==
=== Pre-1947 ===
- Nagpur
- Afghanistan, 1839
- Ghuznee, 1839
- Candahar, 1842
- Ghuznee, 1842
- Cabul, 1842
- Maharajpore
- Sobraon
- Mooltan
- Goojerat
- Punjaub
- Ali Masjid
- China, 1858–59
- Kandahar, 1880
- Afghanistan, 1878-80
- Burma, 1885-87
- China, 1900
- Afghanistan, 1919
- La Bassée, 1914
- Festubert, 1914
- Festubert, 1915
- Neuve Chapelle
- France abd Flanders, 1914–15
- Shaiba
- Kut al Amara, 1915
- Ctesiphon
- Defence of Kut al Amara
- Tigris, 1916
- Khan Baghdadi
- Mesopotamia, 1914–18
- N.W. Frontier, India 1914–15 '17
- Razabil
- Burma 1942–1945
- Jitra
- Kanglatongbi
- Malaya 1941–42
- Nungshigum
- Muar
- North Africa. 1940–43

=== Post-1947 ===
Theatre honours

- Jammu and Kashmir, 1947-48
- Ladakh, 1962
- Punjab, 1965
- East Pakistan, 1971
- Jammu and Kashmir, 1971
- Kargil, 1999

Battle honours

- Rajouri, 2/9 Jat
- Zoji La, 3/9 Jat
- Dograi, 3 Jat
- Phillora, 5 Jat
- Mushkoh, 17 Jat

=== Unit citations ===
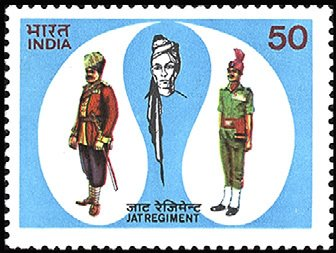
Commemorative stamp celebrating the Jat Regiment in uniforms - past and present, with the image of Subedar Major Mauji Ram in the centre. (1983)

When a unit is decorated for counter-insurgency operations, unit citations are given instead of battle or theatre honours.

- 4th battalion, Nagaland 1995
- 6th battalion, Operation Rhino 2003
- 7th battalion, J & K 1997, J & K 2003 & Operation Rhino 2016
- 11th battalion, Operation Rakshak 2011
- 16th battalion, J & K 2005, 2011
- 17th battalion, Operation Vijay 1999
- 19th battalion, J & K 2003
- 20st battalion, J & K 2020
- 21st battalion, J & K 2004, Operation Rhino 2009
- 22nd Battalion, Operation Rakshak 2018
- 34th battalion Rashtriya Rifles, J & K 1997

== Gallantry awards ==
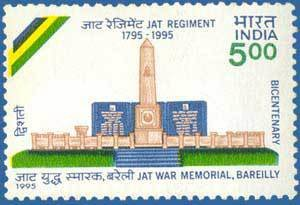
Jat War Memorial, Bareilly - 1995 postal stamp

Pre independence

- Victoria Cross
  - Havildar Abdul Hafiz ϯ, 9th Jat Regiment, Imphal 1944.
- George Cross
  - Lance Naik Islam-ud-Din ϯ, 9th Jat Regiment, Burma 1945
  - Havildar Abdul Rahman ϯ, 3/9th Jat Regiment, Java 1946

Post independence

- Ashok Chakra
  - Major Dinesh Raghu Raman ϯ, 34 Rashtriya Rifles (from 18 Jat), 2007
  - Colonel Jojan Thomas ϯ, 45 Rashtriya Rifles (from 11 Jat), 2008
- Maha Vir Chakra
  - Naik Sishpal Singh, 2 Jat, J & K 1948
  - Havildar Fateh Singh, 3 Jat, J & K 1948
  - Major Ajit Singh, 5 Jat, Indo-China 1962
  - Lieutenant Colonel (later Brigadier) Desmond Hayde, 3 Jat, Dograi 1965
  - Major Asa Ram Tyagi ϯ, 3 Jat, 1965
  - Captain Kapil Singh Thapa ϯ, 3 Jat, 1965
  - Brigadier (later Lieutenant General) Joginder Singh Bakshi, 16 Jat, 1971
  - Captain Anuj Nayyar ϯ, 17 Jat, Kargil 1999
- Kirti Chakra
  - Naib Subedar Daya Nand, 7 Jat, Nagaland 1974
  - Captain Harpal Singh Ahluwalia ϯ, 7 Jat, Nagaland 1974
  - Major Mohinder Singh Kadyan, 7 Jat, Nagaland 1974
  - Major Ram Singh Saharan, 11 Jat, Manipur 1982
  - Subedar Nopa Ram ϯ, 18 Jat, Op Rakshak 1992
  - Captain Dilip Kumar Jha ϯ, 7 Jat / AOC, Op Rakshak 2003
  - Lance Naik Sohanvir ϯ, 7 Jat, Op Rakshak 2003
  - Sepoy Sarwan Kumar Dhukiya ϯ, 34 RR / 15 Jat, Op Rakshak 2003
  - Sepoy Suresh ϯ, 17 Jat, Op Rakshak 2008
  - Major Shatrujeet Kotwal, 34 RR / 3 Jat, Op Rakshak 2008
  - Major Tushar Gauba, 20 Jat, Op Rakshak 2019
- Vir Chakra
  - Subedar Pahlad Singh, 2 Jat, East Pakistan, 1971
  - Naib Subedar Umed Singh ϯ, 2 Jat, East Pakistan, 1971
  - Havildar Hem Chander, 3 Jat, West Pakistan, 1971
  - Lance Havildar Ganga Dhar ϯ, 4 Jat, Fazilka, 1971
  - Major Harish Chandra Sharma, 4 Jat, Fazilka, 1971
  - Lieutenant Colonel Raj Kumar Suri, 4 Jat, Fazilka, 1971
  - Major Sukhpal Singh, 4 Jat, Fazilka, 1971
  - Subedar Brijendra Singh, 4 Jat, Fazilka, 1971
  - Major Narain Singh ϯ, 4 Jat, Fazilka, 1971
  - Captain Kuldip Singh Rathi ϯ, 8 Jat, Poonch, 1971
  - Major Harpal Singh Grewal ϯ, 9 Jat, Chhamb, 1971
  - Second Lieutenant Baljit Singh Gill, 12 Jat, East Pakistan, 1971
  - Subedar Nanji Ram, 12 Jat, East Pakistan, 1971
  - Company Havildar Major Krishan Singh ϯ, 14 Jat, East Pakistan, 1971
  - Naib Subedar Ram Singh, 14 Jat, East Pakistan, 1971
  - Havildar Amar Singh, 11 Jat, Naushera, 1971
  - Sepoy Dharajit Singh Chahar ϯ, 4 Jat, Op Pawan, 1989
  - Captain Alok Singh, 12 Jat, Op Pawan, 1989
  - Havildar Sis Ram Gill ϯ, 8 Jat, Op Vijay, 1999
  - Colonel Umesh Singh Bawa, 17 Jat, Op Vijay, 1999
  - Major Deepak Rampal, 17 Jat, Op Vijay, 1999
  - Havildar Kumar Singh ϯ, 17 Jat, Op Vijay, 1999

ϯ - indicates that the award was given posthumously.

== Affiliations ==
The Jat Regiment is affiliated to INS Trishul of the Indian Navy on 20 January 2009. It was affiliated with the No. 24 Squadron of the Indian Air Force on 19 November 2010.

== Operations ==
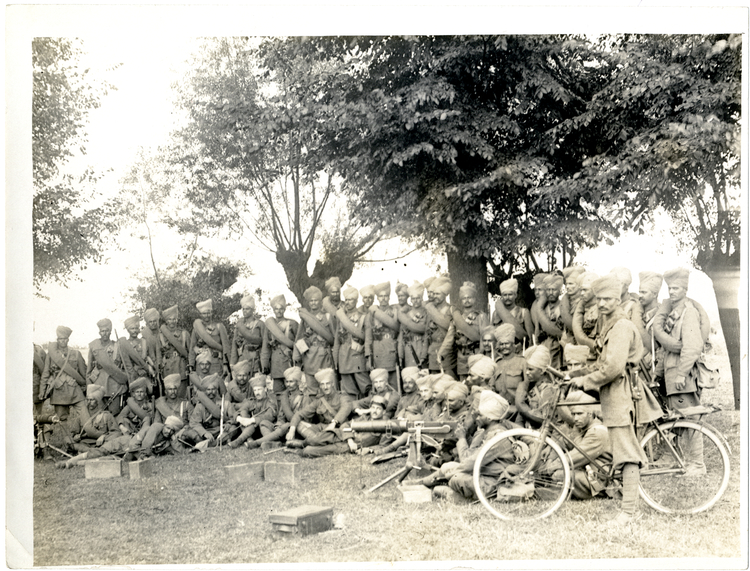
6th Jat Regiment Headquarters Group near Merville, France; July 1915

Operations following the designation as a Jat Regiment -

- World War I - The Regiment saw heavy casualties in the Great War, the 1st were in action in France and Mesopotamia, the 2nd and 3rd fought in the Mesopotamian campaign and the 3rd in the North-West Frontier.
- World War II - The Regiment saw a great deal of fighting in North Africa (3rd battalion), Burma (1st, 3rd, 5th, 6th, 7th battalions and machine gun battalion), Malaya, Singapore (2nd and 4th battalions), and Java-Sumatra.
- India-Pakistan War, 1947-48 : 2nd battalion saw action in Nowshera and was awarded the battle honour Rajouri. 3rd battalion was instrumental in the capture of Zoji La connecting the Kashmir valley with Ladakh, it was awarded the battle honour Zojila.
- Operation Polo, 1948 : 6th battalion took part in the operations to annex the princely state of Hyderabad.
- Sino-Indian War, 1962 : 5th battalion battled Chinese aggression in Ladakh.
- Operation Ragini, 1964 : 7th battalion took action against the Pakistani forces and evicted them after they crossed the Line of Control and established a border post in Tangdhar.
- India-Pakistan War, 1965 : 1st, 3rd, 5th, 6th, and 7th battalion took part in the operations. 3 Jat won the battle honour Dograi by valiantly capturing the village on the outskirts of Lahore. 5 Jat captured the village of Phillora in Shakargarh sector, earning it a battle honour Phillora. 1st Jat took part in operations in the Ranian sector in Punjab. 6 and 7 Jat took part in the operations of 26 Infantry Division in the Jammu-Sialkot sector.
- India-Pakistan War, 1971 : 13 battalions took part in the war to liberate Bangladesh, with eight in the western sector (1 (mechanised), 3, 4, 8, 9, 11, 16 and 17 Jat) and five in the eastern sector (2, 5, 6, 12 and 14 Jat). The latter took part in the battles of Madhumati, Comilla, Maynamati and Kumira. 12 Jat took part in the surrender of Pakistani forces in Chittagong on 17 December 1971. 3 Jat saw action in Jaisalmer and Barmer in Rajasthan. 4 Jat took part in the defence of Fazilka, 8 Jat fought in Poonch, 9 Jat defended Manawar Tawi in Chhamb sector, while 11, 16 and 17 Jat defended the Line of Control.

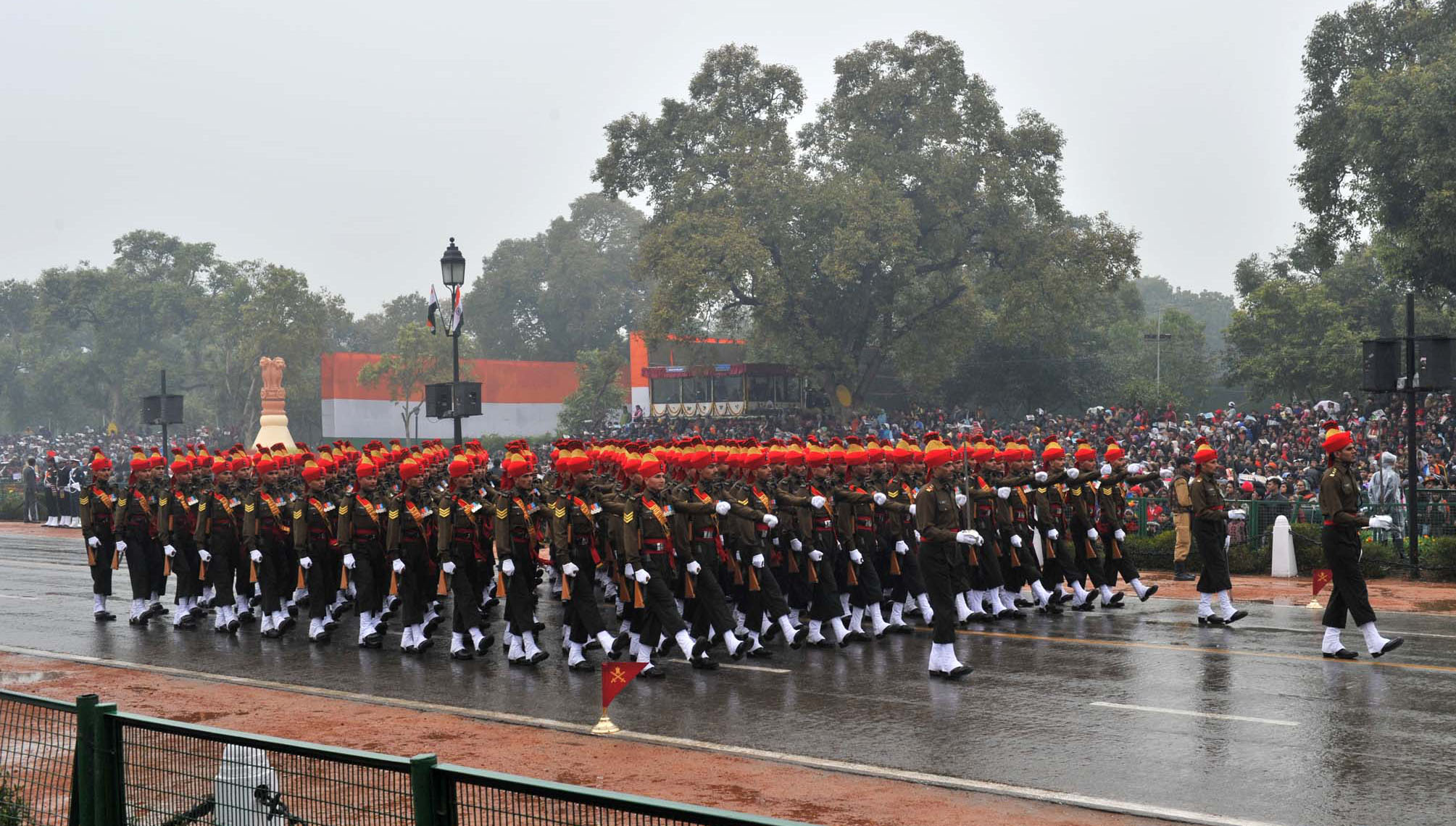
The Jat Regiment marching contingent passes through the Rajpath during the 66th Republic Day Parade 2015. The Regimental contingent was adjudged as Best Marching Contingent in 1974, 2007 & 2021.

- Indian Peace Keeping Force, 1987-90 : 4th, 12th, 14th battalions and 114th (TA) battalion took part in Operation Pawan in Sri Lanka.
- Kargil War, 1999 - 4th, 8th, 12th, 17th, and 18th battalions took part in Operation Vijay.
- UN Missions -
  - Custodian Forces of India - Korea : 6 Jat (1953)
  - United Nations Mission in the Democratic Republic of Congo (MONUC) : 2 Jat (1961)
  - United Nations Mission in Sudan (UNMIS) : 7 Jat (2006), 17 Jat (2010)
  - United Nations Organization Stabilization Mission in the Democratic Republic of the Congo (MONUSCO) : 16 Jat (2012), 21 Jat (2015)
  - United Nations Interim Force in Lebanon (UNIFIL) : 11 Jat (2018)
- Counterinsurgency operations in North East, Punjab and Jammu & Kashmir.

== Others ==
- The Indira Gandhi Paryavaran Puraskar – 2010 (Organisation Category) was awarded to 21st Battalion, the Jat Regiment.
- The launch of the 'Maujiram helpline' by the Jat Regiment Centre in June 2013.

== See also ==
- List of regiments of the Indian Army
- 20th Lancers
- 9th Jat Regiment
- Haryana - military contribution
- Dev Samhita
