= Youth for Heritage Foundation =

- Abbreviation: YfHF
- Formation: 26 January 2014; 12 years ago
- Founder: Vikramjit Singh Rooprai
- Type: NGO
- Purpose: Heritage Awareness and Promotion
- Headquarters: New Delhi
- Website: Youth for Heritage Foundation

The Youth for Heritage Foundation is a non-profit non-governmental organization registered under the Societies Registration Act, 1860. It was started as a hobby project in October 2009 and became popular over time.

== History ==
In October 2009, Vikramjit Singh Rooprai, an information technology consultant and social media guru went on a personal sightseeing trip to monuments in Delhi. He found many sites, for which, there was no reference available online. He launched a project named Didar-i-Dilli and started gathering information about Delhi's heritage. The information was made public via his website monumentsofdelhi.com later that year.

In October 2010, Vikramjit formed an online club named Delhi Heritage Awareness Club. This club started heritage walks with a small group of people. Upon suggestions from members, the club was renamed The Heritage Photography Club. In less than 7 years, they had 21,000 members on Facebook and became one of the largest repository of photographs of monuments from across India.

In 2013, the Heritage Photography Club started organizing heritage talks at monuments. These talks were branded Heritage Durbars. Initially, these durbars (sessions) were held at various monuments in Delhi. In 2014, the club was invited by India Habitat Centre to conduct these sessions at one of their auditoriums. In 2014, the body was registered under the Societies Registration Act as Youth for Heritage Foundation. Rooprai was the founding chairman.

== Activities ==
Youth for Heritage Foundation is involved in heritage promotion and awareness by educational institutions, corporations, and individuals.

=== The Heritage Photography Club ===
The largest arm of Youth for Heritage Foundation is the Delhi Heritage Photography Club. In December 2016, the club was renamed The Heritage Photography Club. Regular heritage photo-walks are organized at monuments across India. The focus remains on educating people about the lesser known aspects, architecture and history of the sites.

=== Heritage Durbars ===
Youth for Heritage Foundation started Heritage Talks in 2013. First talk was held at Zafar Mahal in Mehrauli on Sufism. Since 2014, these talks are being organized in Casuarina and Gulmohar Hall of India Habitat Centre. Every month, a new speaker is identified and a new topic is presented to audience. Personalities like Pushpesh Pant, KK Muhammed, Raza Rumi, Feisal Alkazi, Sohail Hashmi, R.V. Smith, Dr. Sharif Hussain Qasemi and D. N. Chaudhuri have spoken through this platform.

=== Heritage Photography Contests and Exhibitions ===
Under the banner of the Delhi Heritage Photography Club, Youth for Heritage Foundation organizes annual exhibitions. A contest is organized for the selection of images and winning shots are exhibited at the venue. The following exhibitions have been organized by the club:

- 2012 - 'Monuments of Delhi' at India Habitat Centre
- 2013 - 'Monuments of Delhi (Night) - at India Habitat Centre
- 2014 - 'Forgotten Heritage - Delhi' at India Habitat Centre, Red Fort in association with Archaeological Survey of India and 'The Qutub' at Qutub Minar

=== Heritage Ambassadors ===
The foundation constituted a panel to identify heritage lovers operating within their geographic regions, promoting or protecting Heritage. The first Heritage Ambassador award was given on World Heritage Day, 18 April 2015 to Abdul Aziz Rajput of Bijapur for his service to community.

=== Monument Protection ===
Youth for Heritage Foundation has been instrumental in protecting the endangered heritage sites. The group contributed to saving the historic Lal Mahal in Nizamuddin Basti with their #SaveLalMahal campaign. This structure is said to be the oldest structure in India having a true dome and a Taikhana. The structure was being demolished by its owners. Youth for Heritage Foundation raised a petition and upon intervention from different government bodies, the demolition was stopped.
