= Battle of Dograi =

Battle of the Indo-Pakistani War of 1965

- Part of Indo-Pakistani war of 1965
Date	20–22 September 1965 (2 days)
Location	Dograi, Punjab, Pakistan Dograi and surroundings 31.528900°N 77.403333°E
Result	Indian victory

Belligerents
India	Pakistan

Commanders and leaders
Desmond Hayde	Jal Framrose Golwalla

Units involved
3 Jat Regiment	16 Punjab Regiment; 3 Pashtun Regiment

Casualties and losses
58 killed 157 wounded	308 killed 108 captured (Note: Including the Lt. Col. Golewala.)

The Battle of Dograi was a military engagement from 20 to 22 September 1965, during the Indo-Pakistani War of 1965. It took place in the area of Dograi village on the outskirts of Lahore in Pakistani Punjab.

== Background ==
Dograi is a strategically important village as it is located just 8 kilometres (5 mi) from international border, and 16 kilometres (10 mi) from Lahore, the capital of Pakistani Punjab and the 2nd largest city in Pakistan. The village being so close to Lahore gave it a high level of importance as it would be a vital bargaining chip for any territorial negotiations and exchanges after the closure of the Indo-Pakistani War of 1965.

== Preliminaries ==
Prior to the main battle, the Indian Army's 3 Jat battalion had already tried to capture Dograi on 6 September 1965 but had to abandon its positions as they could not be reinforced due to strafing of supply lines by aircraft of the Pakistan Air Force.

Between 6 and 20 September, numerous attempts were made to capture Dograi, but were unsuccessful due to the position having been reinforced by the Pakistan Army.

On 20 September, the 3 Jat unit, consisting of over 500 men and commanded by Lieutenant Colonel Desmond Hayde was tasked with capturing the position.

The defending Pakistani force was composed of troops from 16 Punjab, 3 Pashtun, consisting of over 900 men. 16 Punjab was commanded by Lieutenant Colonel J.F. Golwalla.

Reconnaissance patrols reported that Dograi was well fortified with pillboxes and buildings in the built-up region to cover all axes. The Pakistani infantry battalion had placed two Light Machine Guns in each infantry section, and the assaulting Indian forces were expecting to confront a lot of resistance. Heavy mining and wire also made the approaches extremely hazardous.

== The battle ==
The 3 Jat battalion advanced at night on the flanks of the Pakistani position and launched its attack. Despite the unexpected attack taking Pakistani troops by surprise, fighting was intense and fierce, initially with guns and grenades, and then with bayonets and finally with bare hands. After 27 hours of nonstop combat and flushing-out operations, the Pakistani troops fled from their positions. The Indian forces advanced until the eastern banks of the Icchogil canal, just a few hours before the UN-brokered ceasefire came into effect.

== Result ==
The battle resulted in India's capture of Dograi just a day before ceasefire was announced and was used as a valuable bargaining chip in the Tashkent negotiations.

The battle is commemorated by the Indian Army as 550 Indian troops successfully captured a fortified position from over double the number of well entrenched defenders. For gallantry, the Indian Army awarded three MVCs, 4 VrC, 7 Sena Medals, 12 Mention in Dispatches and 11 COAS Commendation Cards.

== See also ==
- Battle of Phillora
- Battle Of Haji Pir
- Battle of Kasur
- Battle of Chumb
