= No. 112 Helicopter Unit, IAF =

No. 112 Helicopter Unit
- Active: 1 August 1963 – present
- Country: Republic of India
- Branch: Indian Air Force
- Garrison/HQ: Yelahanka AFS
- Nickname: "Throughbreds"
- Mottos: Apatsu Mitram; A friend in time of need

Aircraft flown
- Attack: Mil Mi-17

No. 112 Helicopter Unit (Thoroughbreds) is a Helicopter Unit and is equipped with Mil Mi-17 based at Yelahanka AFS.

== History ==
112 Helicopter Unit, IAF is the alma-mater of all Medium Lift Helicopters, which has been training pilots, flight engineers and flight gunners for achieving highest professional standards.

The president of India, Shri Pranab Mukherjee presented the President's Standard to 112 Helicopter Unit of Indian Air Force on 11 March 2014 at Kanpur. 112 Helicopter Unit was the last flying unit of the IAF to host and retire the Mil Mi-8 helicopters from active duty.

=== Assignments ===
One of the oldest IAF units, 112 Helicopter Unit serves a wartime role such as in Kargil War, Operation Pawan and Indo-Pakistani war of 1971; or supporting civil operations during cyclones, floods and VVIP movements.

=== Aircraft ===
- Bell 47
- Mi-8/8T
