= No. 109 Helicopter Unit, IAF =

No. 109 Helicopter Unit
- Active: 26 August 1961 - Present
- Country: Republic of India
- Branch: Indian Air Force
- Role: EW; Military Transport; Reconnaissance; CasEvac; Close air support
- Garrison/HQ: Sulur AFS
- Nickname: "Knights"
- Mottos: Apatsu Mitram; A friend in time of need

Insignia
- Identification symbol: A Rotary blade on the backdrop of the Himalayan mountains.

Aircraft flown
- Transport: Mi-17 V5

No.109 Helicopter Unit (Knights) is a squadron of the Indian Air Force. Raised on August 26, 1961 equipped with Mi 4s, it later converted to Mi 8s in 1974, which were further replaced by Mi-17 V5 in 2016. Based at Sulur Air Force Station, it currently forms a part of the Southern Air Command.

Since its raising, No. 109 HU has been involved in almost all major military operations, flying in support of Indian Army right from the 1962 conflict with China, to supporting IPKF operations against the LTTE in Sri Lanka in 1987.

== Crest ==
No 109 HU has, as its emblem, a tribladed rotary on the backdrop of the Himalayan mountains. Below this crest, the words Apatsu Mitram (Sanskrit- Friend in need), are inscribed upon a scroll in Devnagari.

== History ==
=== 1962 Sino Indian War ===
No 109 HU had been thrust into action right from the moment of its birth when, in 1962, the Sino-Indian War Broke out. The unit maintained a two aircraft detachment under the Eastern Air Command, which served extensively in CASEVAC and logistics missions in and around the Spiti Valley. in face of extremes of conditions and harshest of terrains.

Following the war, 109 was deployed in a number of different roles, from supporting the Border Roads Development Organisation, in the North East India, to flying in support of disaster relief following the Jagadhri floods in Uttar Pradesh in 1963.

The military role of 109, however, again came into calling when riots broke out in Srinagar in January 1964, preluding to the Second Kashmir War.No 109 HU was heavily involved in the tactical airlift of troops and security personnel into the sensitive areas in the valley, and was also heavily involved in reconnaissance and patrol missions.

=== Assignments ===
- Sino-Indian War
- Second Kashmir War
- Liberation of Bangladesh, 1971
- Siachen
- Bhopal Disaster relief
- IPKF, Jaffna Helidrop
- IPKF Jaffna Operations
- 2015 South Indian floods
- Aero India
- Iron Fist (exercise)
