= Indian intervention in the Sri Lankan civil war =

- Part of the Sri Lankan civil war
Date	29 July 1987 – 24 March 1990 (2 years, 7 months, 3 weeks and 3 days)
Location	Sri Lanka
Result	Withdrawal after ceasefire

Belligerents
India; Sri Lanka	Liberation Tigers of Tamil Eelam

Commanders and leaders
(India) President R. Venkataraman (India) Prime Minister Rajiv Gandhi (India) Defence Minister V P Singh; Maj.Gen. Harkirat Singh; Maj.Gen. AM Malik; Maj.Gen. Ashok K. Mehta	Velupillai Prabhakaran

Units involved
Indian Armed Forces; Indian Peace Keeping Force; Indian Army; Indian Navy; Indian Air Force	Liberation Tigers of Tamil Eelam; Sea Tigers; Air Tigers; Black Tigers (Details)

Strength
100,000 (peak)	Unknown

Casualties and losses
1,165 killed, 3009 Wounded	LTTE: 5000+ killed and wounded

The Indian intervention in the Sri Lankan civil war was the deployment of the Indian Peace Keeping Force in Sri Lanka intended to perform a peacekeeping role. The deployment followed the Indo-Sri Lankan Accord between India and Sri Lanka of 1987 which was intended to end the Sri Lankan civil war between separatist Sri Lankan Tamil nationalists, principally the Liberation Tigers of Tamil Eelam (LTTE), and the Sri Lankan Military.

The original intention was the Indian Peace Keeping Force would not be involved in large scale military operations. However, after a few months, the Indian Peace Keeping Force engaged the Liberation Tigers of Tamil Eelam in a series of battles. During the two years in which it was deployed, the IPKF fought numerous battles against the LTTE. During 1989, the Sri Lankan government and the LTTE reached to an agreement and ceased the combat. From May 1989, the Sri Lankan government started to provide weapons to the LTTE for securing the departure of the IPKF. On June 2, the Sri Lankan government asked IPKF to leave and an official ceasefire agreement between the Sri Lankan government and the LTTE was signed on June 28. In 1990, the IPKF withdrew under the government of V. P. Singh after Ranasinghe Premadasa asked IPKF to leave at the time when the LTTE was almost defeated.

== Background ==
The LTTE and other Tamil militant groups developed strong relationships with political parties in South India, such as Dravidar Kazhagam (led by K. Veeramani), Kamaraj Congress (led by Nedumaran) and Pure Tamil Movement (led by Perinchintanarayanan) during late 1970s. These Tamil parties firmly backed the militants' cause of creating a separate Tamil Eelam within Sri Lanka.

According to Rejaul Karim Laskar, a scholar of Indian foreign policy, Indian intervention in Sri Lankan civil war became inevitable as that civil war threatened India’s "unity, national interest and territorial integrity." According to Laskar, this threat came in two ways: On the one hand external powers could take advantage of the situation to establish their overseas bases in Sri Lanka thus posing a threat to India, and on the other, the LTTE’s dream of a sovereign Tamil Eelam comprising all the Tamil inhabited areas (of Sri Lanka) posed a threat to India’s territorial integrity.

The LTTE and other Tamil militant groups developed strong relationships with political parties in South India, such as Pure Tamil Movement (led by Perunchithiranar), Dravidar Kazhagam (led by K. Veeramani), Kamaraj Congress (led by Nedumaran) during the late 1970s. These Tamil parties firmly backed the militants' cause of creating a separate Tamil Eelam within Sri Lanka. Thereafter, LTTE developed relations with M. G. Ramachandran and M. Karunanidhi, who served as Chief Minister of Tamil Nadu, succeeding one another.

Although Sri Lanka was a key member of Non-Aligned Movement in its initial stages, the Government of Sri Lanka's policies became pro-western as J. R. Jayewardene was elected prime minister with his landslide victory in 1977 parliamentary election. Subsequently, he introduced a new constitution and open economy to Sri Lanka. Sri Lanka is the first South-Asian country to adopt liberal open economy. Together with these developments, India was also concerned about

- Presence of Israeli Shin Bet intelligence operatives to train Sri Lankan troops on intelligence operations, Pakistani Special Services Group led by Brigadier Tariq Mohommad to assist Sri Lankan commandos, and South African mercenaries to train Sri Lanka Air Force pilots in low contour flying, in Colombo, etc.

Moreover, President J. R. Jayawardene did not enjoy the same warm relationship with Indian Prime Minister Indira Gandhi that he had enjoyed with her father, Prime Minister Jawaharlal Nehru. Thus, with the outbreak of Black July racial riots, the Indian government decided to support the insurgent groups operating in Northern Sri Lanka.

== Training the militants ==
Beginning in August 1983, till May 1987, India, through its intelligence agency Research and Analysis Wing (R&AW), provided arms, training and monetary support to 6 Sri Lankan Tamil militant groups, namely Liberation Tigers of Tamil Eelam (LTTE), Tamil Eelam Liberation Organization (TELO), People's Liberation Organisation of Tamil Eelam (PLOTE), Eelam Revolutionary Organisation of Students (EROS) Eelam People's Revolutionary Liberation Front (EPRLF) and Tamil Eelam Liberation Army (TELA). Even the state governments or Sri Lankan opposition leader Appapillai Amirthalingam were not aware of such a mission until April 1984. The LTTE's rise is widely attributed to the initial backing it received from RAW. It is believed that by supporting different militant groups, the Indian government hoped to keep the Tamil independence movement divided and be able to exert overt control over it.

During that period, 32 camps were set up all over India to train these militants. However Prime Minister Indira Gandhi maintained the position that "We have never interfered with the internal developments of any country in the past and we will not do so now." Contrary to her statement, 3363 Tamil insurgents, including 10 batches of LTTE (405 men and 90 women) were given military training to fight against Sri Lankan armed forces during the succeeding years. Initially 350 TELO cadres were trained at Dehradun, in the hills of Uttar Pradesh. It was followed with training for 200 cadres from EROS, 100 from EPRLF, and 70 from PLOTE. LTTE was the last insurgent group to enter the training. First batch of Tigers were trained in Establishment 22 based in Chakrata, Uttarakhand. Second batch was trained in Himachal Pradesh. 8 other batches of LTTE were trained in Tamil Nadu. Ironically, Thenmozhi Rajaratnam alias Dhanu, who carried out the assassination of Rajiv Gandhi and Sivarasan - the key conspirator were among the militants trained by RAW, in Nainital, North India.

== Operation Poomalai ==
India became more actively involved in the late 1980s, and on 5 June 1987, the Indian Air Force airdropped food parcels to Jaffna while it was under siege by Sri Lankan forces. At a time when the Sri Lankan government stated they were close to defeating the LTTE, India dropped 25 tons of food and medicine by parachute into areas held by the LTTE in a direct move of support toward the separatists. Further Sri Lanka government accused, that not only food and medicine but weapons were also supplied to the LTTE. Negotiations were held, and the Indo-Sri Lanka Peace Accord was signed on 29 July 1987, by Indian Prime Minister Rajiv Gandhi and Sri Lankan President Jayewardene. Under this accord, the Sri Lankan Government made a number of concessions to Tamil demands, including a devolution of power to the provinces, a merger—subject to later referendum—of the Northern and the Eastern provinces into the single province, and official status for the Tamil language (this was enacted as the 13th Amendment to the Constitution of Sri Lanka). India agreed to establish order in the North and East through a force dubbed the Indian Peace Keeping Force (IPKF), and to cease assisting Tamil insurgents. Militant groups including the LTTE, although initially reluctant, agreed to surrender their arms to the IPKF, which initially oversaw a cease-fire and a modest disarmament of the militant groups.

The signing of the Indo-Lanka Accord, so soon after JR Jayawardene's declaration that he would fight the Indians to the last bullet, led to unrest in south. The arrival of the IPKF to take over control of most areas in the North of the country enabled the Sri Lanka government to shift its forces to the south (in Indian aircraft) to quell the protests. This led to an uprising by the Janatha Vimukthi Peramuna in the south, which was put down bloodily over the next two years.

== Conflict with the LTTE ==
While most Tamil militant groups laid down their weapons and agreed to seek a peaceful solution to the conflict, the LTTE refused to disarm its fighters. Keen to ensure the success of the accord, the IPKF then tried to demobilize the LTTE by force and ended up in full-scale conflict with them. The three-year-long conflict was also marked by the IPKF being accused of committing various abuses of human rights by many human rights groups as well as some within the Indian media. The IPKF also soon met stiff opposition from the Tamils.

=== Operation Pawan ===
Operation Pawan was the codename assigned to the operations by the Indian Peace Keeping Force to take control of Jaffna from the LTTE in late 1987 to enforce the disarmament of the LTTE as a part of the Indo-Sri Lankan Accord. In brutal fighting that took about three weeks, the IPKF wrested control of the Jaffna Peninsula from LTTE rule. Supported by Indian Army tanks, helicopter gunships and heavy artillery, the LTTE were routed; however, the IPKF lost 214 soldiers in the hostilities.

=== The Jaffna University Helidrop ===
The Jaffna University Helidrop was the first of the operations launched by the Indian Peace Keeping Forces (IPKF) aimed at disarming the Tamil Tigers (LTTE) by force and securing the town of Jaffna, Sri Lanka, in the opening stages of Operation Pawan during the active Indian mediation in the Sri Lankan Civil War. Mounted on the midnight of 12 October 1987, the operation was planned as a fast heliborne assault involving Mi-8s of the No. 109 Helicopter Unit, the 10th Para Commandos and a contingent of the 13th Sikh Light Infantry. The aim of the operation was to capture the LTTE leadership at Jaffna University building which served as the tactical headquarters of the LTTE, which was expected to shorten Operation Pawan, the battle for Jaffna. However, the operation ended disastrously, failing to capture its objectives -owing to intelligence and planning failures. The heli dropped force suffered significant casualties, with nearly the entire Sikh LI detachment of twenty nine troops falling to the heavy fortifications of the university and fighting until death, along with six Para commandos falling in battle.

== End of Indian involvement ==
Nationalist sentiment led many Sinhalese to oppose the continued Indian presence in Sri Lanka. These led to the Sri Lankan government's call for India to quit the island, and they entered into a secret deal with the LTTE that culminated in a ceasefire. But the LTTE and IPKF continued to have frequent hostilities. In April 1989, the Ranasinghe Premadasa government ordered the Sri Lanka Army to clandestinely hand over arms consignments to the LTTE to fight the IPKF and its proxy Tamil National Army (TNA). Although casualties among the IPKF mounted, and calls for the withdrawal of the IPKF from both sides of the Sri Lankan conflict grew, Rajiv Gandhi refused to remove the IPKF from Sri Lanka. However, following his defeat in Indian parliamentary elections in December 1989, the new Prime Minister V. P. Singh ordered the withdrawal of the IPKF, and their last ship left Sri Lanka on 24 March 1990. The 32-month presence of the IPKF in Sri Lanka resulted in the deaths of 1,165 Indian soldiers and over 5,000 Sri Lankans. The cost for the Government of India was estimated at over ₹10.3 billion (equivalent to ₹140 billion or US$1.5 billion in 2026).

=== Rajiv Gandhi's assassination ===
Support for the LTTE in India dropped considerably in 1991, after the assassination of ex-Prime Minister Rajiv Gandhi by a female suicide bomber named Thenmozhi Rajaratnam. The Indian press has subsequently reported that Prabhakaran decided to eliminate Gandhi as he considered the ex-prime minister to be against the Tamil liberation struggle and feared that he might re-induct the IPKF, which Prabhakaran termed the "satanic force", if he won the 1991 Indian general election. In 1998 a court in India presided over by Special Judge V. Navaneetham found the LTTE and its leader Velupillai Prabhakaran responsible for the assassination. In a 2006 interview, LTTE ideologue Anton Balasingham stated regret over the assassination, although he stopped short of outright acceptance of responsibility for it.
