= Loharheri =

- Village
- Location in Haryana, India Loharheri (India)
- Country: India
- State: Haryana
- Region: North India
- District: Jhajjar

Languages
  - Official: Hindi
- Time zone: UTC+5:30 (IST)
- Vehicle registration: HR-13
- Website: haryana.gov.in

Loharheri is a village in Jhajjar Mandal, Jhajjar District in Haryana, It is located from 15 kilometres (9 mi) from nearest city Bahadurgarh and about 36 km from Jhajjar city, the district headquarter.↵The village is famous for its Baba Dudhadhari temple. Every year villagers organise a big Bhandara and Mela on the eve of Birthday of Baba Dudhadhari on next of Dulandhi. Village also has its own stadium where boys work on their physique. This village gave many sportsmen to Haryana and India mostly Weightlifters. Village is famous for its Soldiers, freedom fighters and kargil war fighters. Majority of people in this village is Jat of Redhu and Tehlan Gotra.

Most of the people living here, work in government and private departments located in Delhi. It is 40 km (25 mi) from National Capital New Delhi and can be reached by both train or road.

In the late 1980s and early 1990s, Loharheri was part of Papankalan – the name given to a new sub-city of Delhi based on the name of six villages whose land had been acquired and pooled. The name of the sub-city was later changed to Dwarka.
