= Rashtriya Rifles =

Indian counter-insurgency force

- Insignia of the Rashtriya Rifles
- Active: 1990 – present
- Country: India
- Branch: Indian Army
- Type: Infantry
- Role: Counter-insurgency
- Size: 45,000
- Headquarters: Udhampur
- Nickname: RR
- Mottos: Dridhta aur virta (Courage and Valour)
- War Cry: Bajrangbali ki jai (Glory to Lord Hanuman)
- Anniversaries: 1 October

Commanders
- Additional Director General: Major General Anupam Bhagi

Insignia
- Insignia: Crossed AK-47 with Ashoka Chakra
- Flag

The Rashtriya Rifles (RR; transl. National rifles) is a counter-terrorism force in India, formed in 1990, to deal with internal security in the Jammu and Kashmir region. They maintain public order by drawing powers from the Armed Forces (Jammu and Kashmir) Special Powers Act, 1990 (AFSPA). Its personnel are provided by the Indian Army on deputation.

The force operates under the Ministry of Defence. The Indian Army describes RR as its "specialist elite force to combat insurgency." The RR is headquartered at Northern Command in Udhampur and commanded by an Additional Director General of Rashtriya Rifles (ADG RR).

== History ==
The continuous deployment of the Indian Army in domestic counter-insurgency operations, alongside the existing conventional duties at the borders, necessitated a specially structured and organized force to manage India's internal security challenges while also supporting the Indian Army during conventional conflicts. In 1988, a proposal for a counter-insurgency force was presented to the Government of India.

Rashtriya Rifles was raised on 1 October 1990 by the then Chief of the Army Staff (COAS), General S. F. Rodrigues, with Lieutenant General P. C. Mankotia serving as its first Director General of Rashtriya Rifles (DG RR). The force was composed entirely of personnel on deputation from the Indian Army. It was created by reconstituting two Indian Army corps (about 75,000 troops). Initially, six battalions were raised, with three deployed in Punjab and three in Jammu and Kashmir. By 1994 General Joshi had expanded the force to 36 battalions through persistent advocacy with the government. Eventually, all battalions were repositioned exclusively to Jammu and Kashmir, where they have since engaged in low-intensity conflicts. The next COAS, General Shankar Roy Chowdhury, directed each regiment to raise two battalions for the RR. The Indian Army describes RR as their "specialist elite force to combat insurgency". Their motto is dridta aur veerta, meaning determination and valour.

== Funding ==
Until 1997, the Rashtriya Rifles was funded by the Ministry of Home Affairs (MHA), as internal security fell under its jurisdiction, despite the force being carved out from existing Indian Army regiments. From 1990 onwards, the MHA owed a sum of ₹950 crore (US$99 million) to the Army for the raising and equipping of the RR. Beginning in the 1998-99 fiscal year, the Ministry of Defence (MOD) allocated separate funds for the RR under the Army's demands for grants. By the end of 2005, the force was projected to consist of 66 battalions, each with 1,150 personnel dedicated to counter-insurgency operations. The budgetary allocation for the force rose significantly, from ₹263 crore (equivalent to ₹28 billion or US$290 million in 2026) in 1998-99 to ₹1,414 crore (equivalent to ₹50 billion or US$510 million in 2026) in 2006-07. Today, the RR budget is allocated separately from the Army's budget under distinct heads. In 2024-25, the government of India allocated ₹10,534 crore (equivalent to ₹110 billion or US$1.2 billion in 2026) as demands for grants.

== Organisation ==
=== Structure ===
The Rashtriya Rifles (RR) has a distinct administrative and organizational structure compared to the Indian Army. It lacks formal categorization and is often described as a paramilitary force. In terms of training and equipment, it occupies a position between a paramilitary organization and the regular army. General K. V. Krishna Rao, former Chief of the Army Staff, referred to it as "a semi-military organization". Unlike the Army, RR battalions have support services, such as the Indian Army Service Corps and Indian Army Corps of Engineers, available at the battalion level rather than the brigade level. Each battalion consists of six companies, rather than the infantry’s four - without heavy weapons, though troops are trained to operate them. Unlike regular Army units, RR units are stationed in fixed locations and operate under five sector headquarters, each led by a two-star ranking Major General: Victor Force (Valley (Kashmir)), Kilo Force (Kupwara and Baramulla), Delta Force (Doda), Romeo Force (Rajouri and Poonch), and Uniform Force (Udhampur).

The RR was raised in 1990 as a temporary force under the provisions of the Union Composite Table, Part II, allowing it to be disbanded at any time through an executive order. It continues to operate as a temporary force without a permanent mandate from the Ministry of Defence. The question of granting it a permanent status has been a subject of contention between the Ministry of Defence and the Ministry of Finance. The Ministry of Home Affairs has also questioned the rationale behind the creation of the RR, arguing that it suggests internal rebellions are a "permanent feature in India". During the Kargil War (1999), the Border Security Force (BSF) refused to serve under RR, arguing that they were of equal stature. The RR was initially headquartered at the Army's main office in New Delhi and led by the Director General of Rashtriya Rifles (DG RR), a lieutenant general in the Indian Army. In 2021, as part of restructuring aimed at reducing its scope, its headquarters was shifted to Northern Command in Udhampur and its chief was downgraded to an Additional Director General of Rashtriya Rifles (ADG RR), a major general.

=== Personnel and activities ===
The personnel in RR come on deputation from all arms and services of the Indian Army. Originally, only 25% of RR personnel were meant to be drawn from the Indian Army, with the remainder recruited from ex-servicemen and lateral inductees from other paramilitary forces. RR battalions are affiliated with various regiments of the Army, with their officers and soldiers typically serving a tenure of around 30 months. Since RR units operate in places designated as "disturbed areas", they operate by the provisions of the Armed Forces (Special Powers) Act (AFSPA). The RR underwent significant expansion during the Bharatiya Janata Party-administration, with its strength increasing from 36 battalions in 1999 to a planned 66 battalions by 2005. However, three battalions did not receive final sanction, leaving the total at 63 battalions with a strength of approximately 75,000 personnel by 2005.

According to the Ministry of Defence, the RR is the "counter-insurgency/counter-terrorism arm of the Indian Army". Since its inception, the RR has neutralised a total of 16,368 terrorists, including 8,522 killed, 6,737 apprehended, and 1,109 who surrendered, as of 2015. The Jammu & Kashmir Light Infantry does not have an RR battalion associated with it because its troops are all recruited locally from the J&K region, which provides valuable local resources and knowledge of terrain, language, and information of the region to the army; hence, the regiment has small teams allocated to all RR battalions instead of having its own RR battalion.

=== Civic and relief activities ===
Alongside its counter-insurgency and counter-terrorism role, Rashtriya Rifles units have participated in civic and humanitarian activities in Jammu and Kashmir. The Ministry of Defence stated on the force's 27th Raising Day in 2017 that RR units had participated in flood-relief operations and activities intended to improve the quality of life of local communities.

RR units have also participated in Operation Sadbhavana, the Indian Army's civic-action programme in Jammu and Kashmir. In January 2015, for example, the 26 Rashtriya Rifles (Kumaon) organised a Sadbhavana tour for senior citizens, local leaders and sarpanches from Doda and Kishtwar.

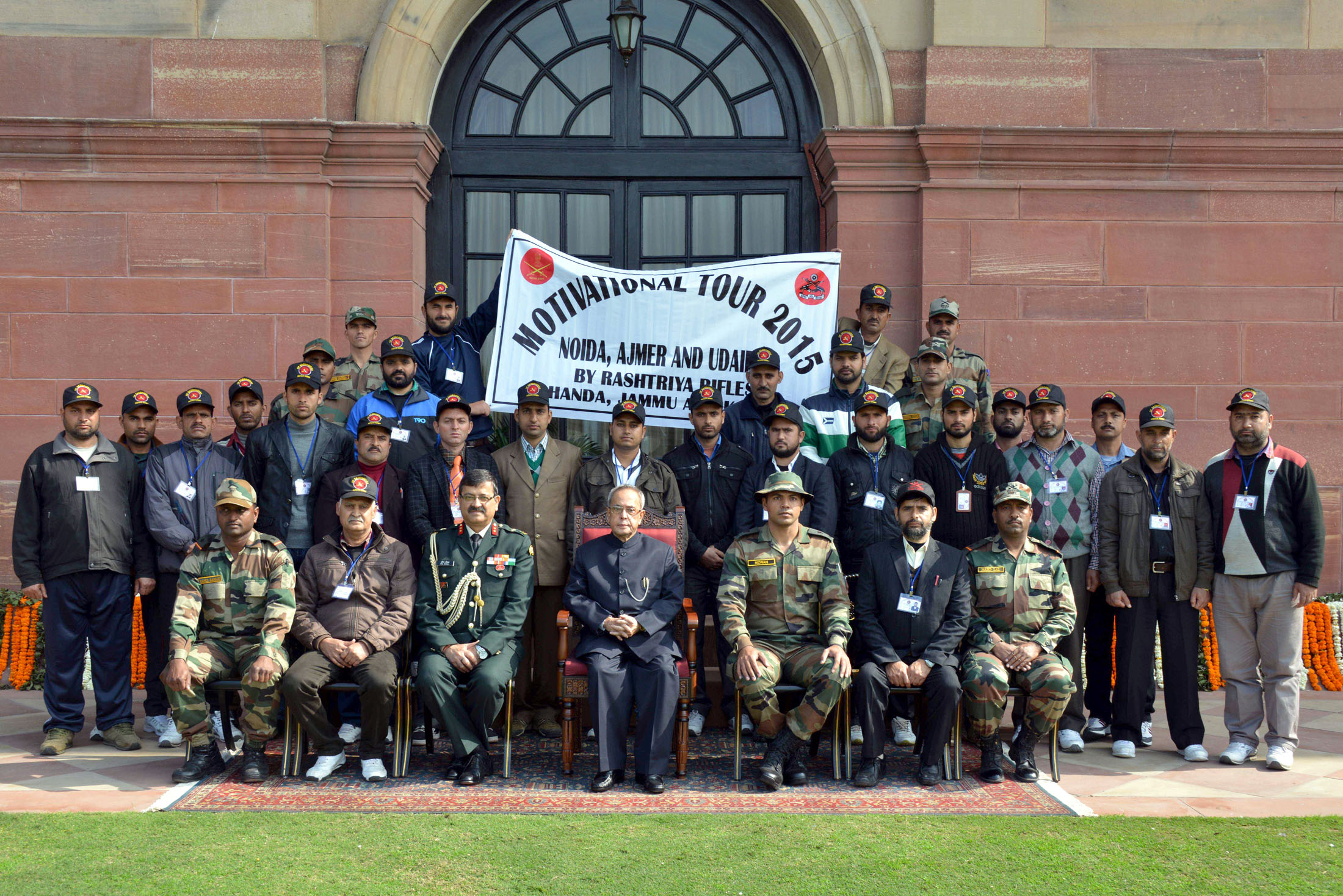
Senior citizens and local representatives from Doda and Kishtwar participating in an Operation Sadbhavana tour organised by 26 Rashtriya Rifles in 2015

=== Counter Insurgency Force ===
RR units are organized under five "Counter Insurgency Force" (CIF) HQs. Each CIF is responsible for an area of the Kashmir Valley and Jammu Division.

- Counter Insurgency Force (CIF) R / Romeo Force – Rajouri and Poonch.
- Counter Insurgency Force (CIF) D / Delta Force – Doda and Kishtwar.
- Counter Insurgency Force (CIF) V / Victor Force – Valley districts (Anantnag, Pulwama, Shopian, Kulgam, and Budgam).
- Counter Insurgency Force (CIF) K / Kilo Force – Kupwara, Baramulla, and Srinagar.
- Counter Insurgency Force (CIF) U / Uniform Force – Udhampur and Banihal, now also covering Ladakh.

Victor Force and Kilo Force operate under the control of the XV Corps. Delta Force and Romeo Force operate under the control of XVI Corps. Uniform Force, which earlier used to operate under the XVI Corps, was moved from the Poonch sector to the Ladakh sector (under I Corps) in 2020 to counter Chinese aggression.

=== Operational sectors ===
The areas covered by the CIFs are further divided into sectors:

- Sector 1 – Anantnag district
- Sector 2 – Kulgam district
- Sector 3 – Manasbal Lake
- Sector 4 – Doda district
- Sector 5 – Baramulla district
- Sector 6 – Poonch district
- Sector 7 – Kupwara district
- Sector 8 – Kupwara district
- Sector 9 – Kishtwar district
- Sector 10 – Baramulla district
- Sector 11 – Banihal
- Sector 12 – Budgam district
- Sector 13 - Rajouri district

=== Battalions ===
RR comprises 65 battalions. Each battalion has over 1,100 men organized into six companies. Known RR battalion affiliations include:

- 1 RR – Mahar Regiment
- 2 RR – Sikh Light Infantry
- 3 RR – Jammu & Kashmir Rifles
- 4 RR – Bihar Regiment
- 5 RR – Jat Regiment
- 6 RR – Sikh Regiment
- 7 RR – Punjab Regiment
- 8 RR – Madras Regiment
- 9 RR – Rajputana Rifles
- 10 RR – Rajput Regiment
- 11 RR – Dogra Regiment
- 12 RR – The Grenadiers
- 13 RR – Kumaon Regiment
- 14 RR – Garhwal Rifles
- 15 RR – Gorkha Rifles
- 16 RR – Sikh Regiment
- 17 RR – Maratha Light Infantry
- 18 RR – Rajputana Rifles
- 19 RR – Sikh Light Infantry
- 20 RR – Dogra Regiment
- 21 RR – Brigade of the Guards
- 22 RR – Punjab Regiment
- 23 RR – Rajput Regiment
- 24 RR – Bihar Regiment
- 25 RR – Madras Regiment
- 26 RR – Kumaon Regiment
- 27 RR – Maratha Light Infantry
- 28 RR – Jammu & Kashmir Rifles
- 29 RR – The Grenadiers
- 30 RR – Mahar Regiment
- 31 RR – Parachute Regiment
- 32 RR – Gorkha Rifles
- 33 RR – Gorkha Rifles
- 34 RR – Jat Regiment
- 35 RR – Assam Regiment
- 36 RR – Garhwal Rifles
- 37 RR – Punjab Regiment
- 38 RR – Madras Regiment
- 39 RR – The Grenadiers
- 40 RR – Dogra Regiment
- 41 RR – Maratha Light Infantry
- 42 RR – Assam Regiment
- 43 RR – Rajputana Rifles
- 44 RR – Rajput Regiment
- 45 RR – Jat Regiment
- 46 RR – Sikh Regiment
- 47 RR – Bihar Regiment
- 48 RR – Garhwal Rifles
- 49 RR – Sikh Light Infantry
- 50 RR – Kumaon Regiment
- 51 RR – Mahar Regiment
- 52 RR – Jammu & Kashmir Rifles
- 53 RR – Punjab Regiment
- 54 RR – Madras Regiment
- 55 RR – The Grenadiers
- 56 RR – Maratha Light Infantry
- 57 RR – Rajputana Rifles
- 58 RR – Rajput Regiment
- 59 RR – Assam Regiment
- 60 RR – Naga Regiment
- 61 RR – Jat Regiment
- 62 RR – Dogra Regiment
- 63 RR – Bihar Regiment

=== Crest ===
The RR crest consists of the Ashoka Chakra, and two crossed Kalashnikov rifles with fixed bayonets. Beneath, in a banner, is emblazoned the RR's motto: Dridhta aur Veerta (Persistence and Valour).

== Awards and decorations ==
Rashtriya Rifles units and personnel have received numerous Indian military decorations for service in counter-insurgency and counter-terrorism operations. As of the force's 27th Raising Day on 1 October 2017, personnel of the Rashtriya Rifles had received seven Ashoka Chakras, 34 Kirti Chakras, 238 Shaurya Chakras and 1,637 Sena Medals. RR units had also received 67 Chief of the Army Staff Unit Citations.

Among its decorated personnel was Lance Naik Nazir Ahmad Wani of the Jammu and Kashmir Light Infantry and 34 Rashtriya Rifles, who was awarded the Ashoka Chakra posthumously in 2019.

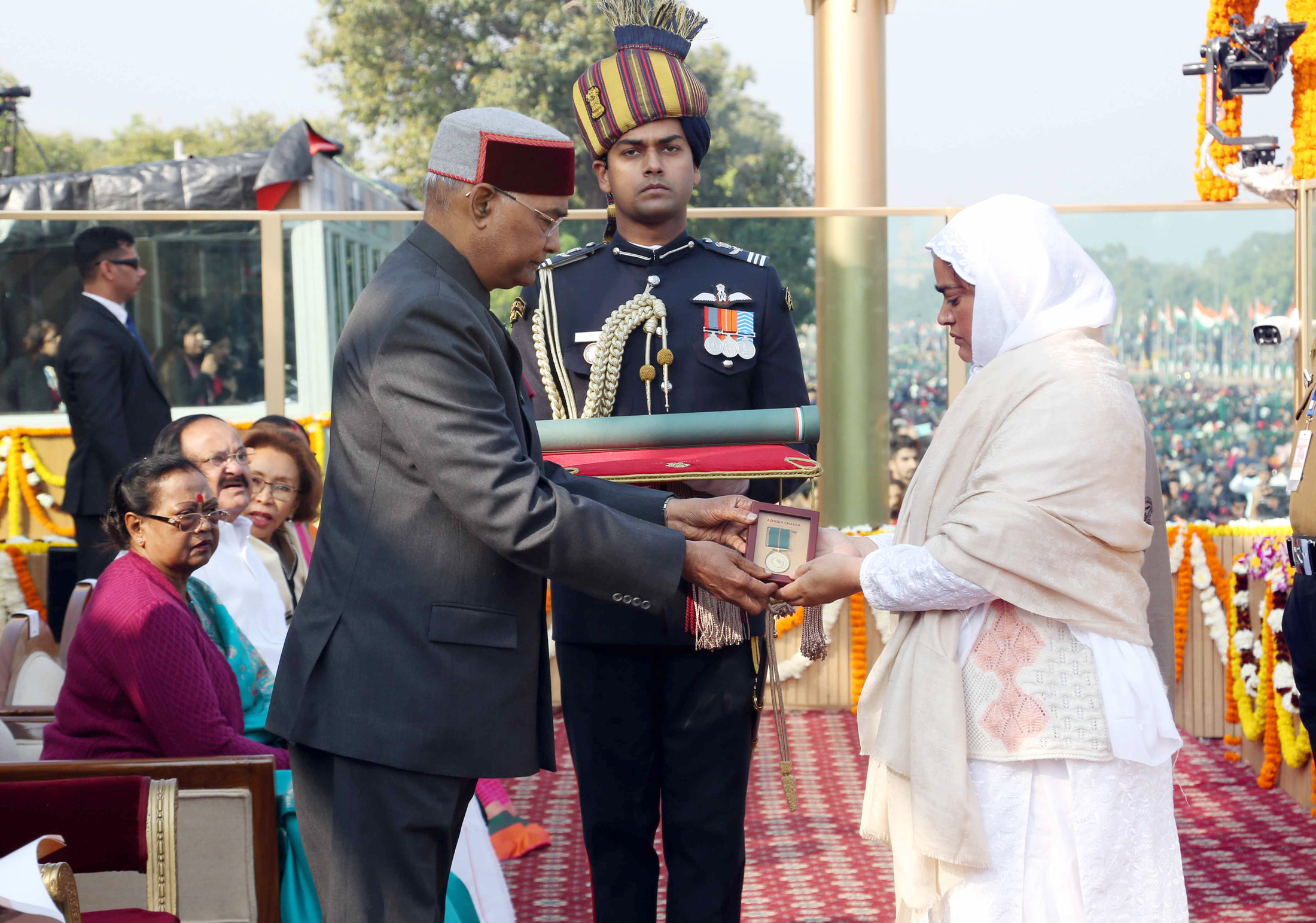
The posthumous Ashoka Chakra awarded to Lance Naik Nazir Ahmad Wani of 34 Rashtriya Rifles being presented in 2019

== In the media ==
In March 2017, then Chief of the Army Staff General Bipin Rawat released Home of the Brave, a book on the history of the Rashtriya Rifles authored by defence and security analyst Nitin A. Gokhale and Brigadier S. K. Chatterji. The Ministry of Defence described the book as a chronicle of the force's history and achievements.

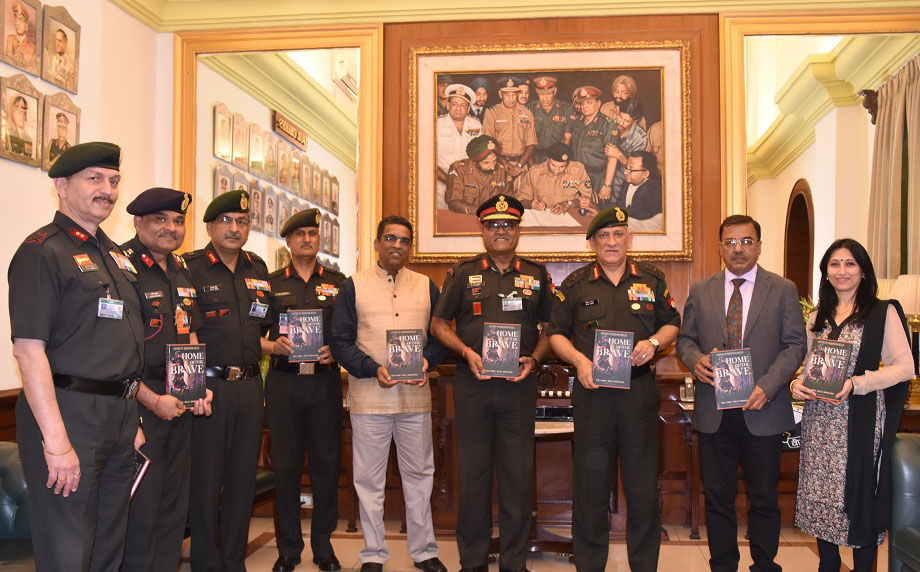
General Bipin Rawat releasing Home of the Brave, a history of the Rashtriya Rifles, in 2017

The 2024 Tamil biographical film Amaran depicts the life and military service of Major Mukund Varadarajan, who served with 44 Rashtriya Rifles.

== Funding ==
Until 1997, the Rashtriya Rifles was funded by the Ministry of Home Affairs (MHA), as internal security fell under its jurisdiction, despite the force being drawn from existing Indian Army regiments. Beginning with the 1998–99 financial year, the Ministry of Defence began allocating separate funds for the Rashtriya Rifles under the Army's demands for grants.

The Rashtriya Rifles continues to have a separately identified allocation within the Ministry of Defence's Defence Services (Revenue) budget. Government budget documents recorded actual expenditure of ₹9,729.94 crore (equivalent to ₹100 billion or US$1.1 billion in 2026) in 2024–25. The budget estimate for 2025–26 was ₹11,290 crore (equivalent to ₹120 billion or US$1.2 billion in 2026), subsequently revised to ₹10,599.42 crore (equivalent to ₹110 billion or US$1.1 billion in 2026). For 2026–27, the Government of India budgeted ₹12,052.59 crore (US$1.3 billion) for the Rashtriya Rifles.

=== Modernisation ===
In May 2026, the Indian Army initiated a procurement process for 159 bullet-proof troop carriers for Rashtriya Rifles battalions, sector headquarters and force headquarters deployed in Jammu and Kashmir and Ladakh. The planned vehicles are intended to provide protected mobility in difficult and mountainous terrain and are required to operate at altitudes of up to 5,000 metres (16,000 ft).

== See also ==
- Assam Rifles
- List of counter-terrorism units
