= Officers Training Academy =

Governmental Academy for the training and commissioning of Indian Army's officers

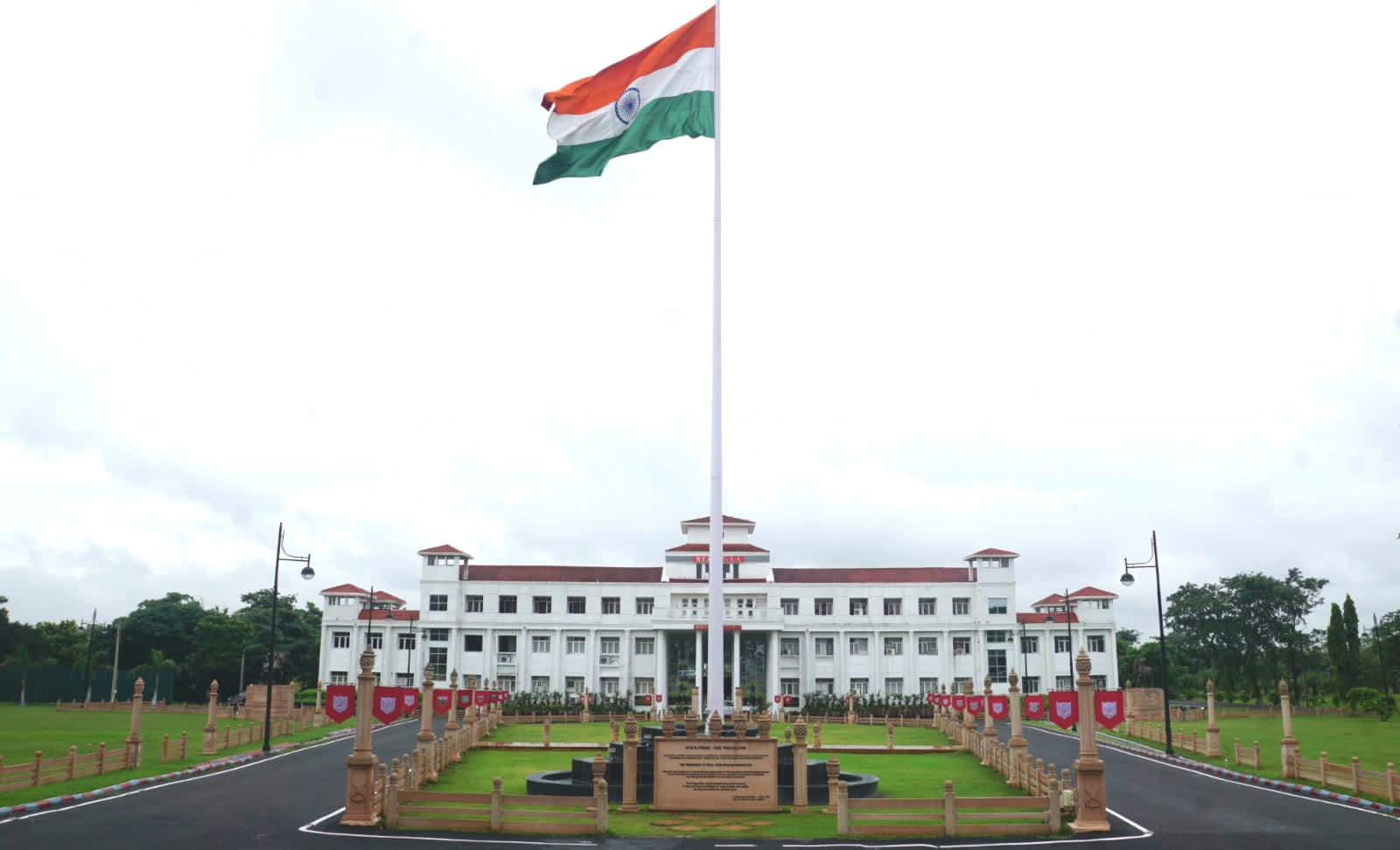
- OTA Chennai
- Motto: Serve with Honour
- Type: Military academy
- Established: January 15, 1963; 63 years ago
- Affiliations: Madras University
- Location: Chennai; Gaya, India; 13.000651°N 80.189788°E - Chennai
- Campus: 750 acres (3.0 km^{2}) (OTA Chennai)

The Officers Training Academy (OTA) is a training establishment of the Indian Army that trains officers for the Short Service Commission (SSC). The 49-week course at the OTA prepares graduates for all branches of the Army, except for the Army Medical Corps. Established in 1963, the first academy is located in Alandur, a southern neighbourhood of Chennai. OTA chennai has an impressive tally of gallantry award including 1 Param Vir Chakra, 8 Ashoka Chakra, 10 Maha Vir Chakra, 22 Kirti Chakra, 63 Vir Chakra, 119 Shaurya Chakra and 587 Sena Medal earned by the officers commissioned from this academy bears testimony to the Valour and dedication displayed by the Alumni. A new academy was set up at Gaya in 2011; which was given the go-ahead in December 2019 to be disbanded, but continues to operate.

== History ==
=== OTA Chennai ===
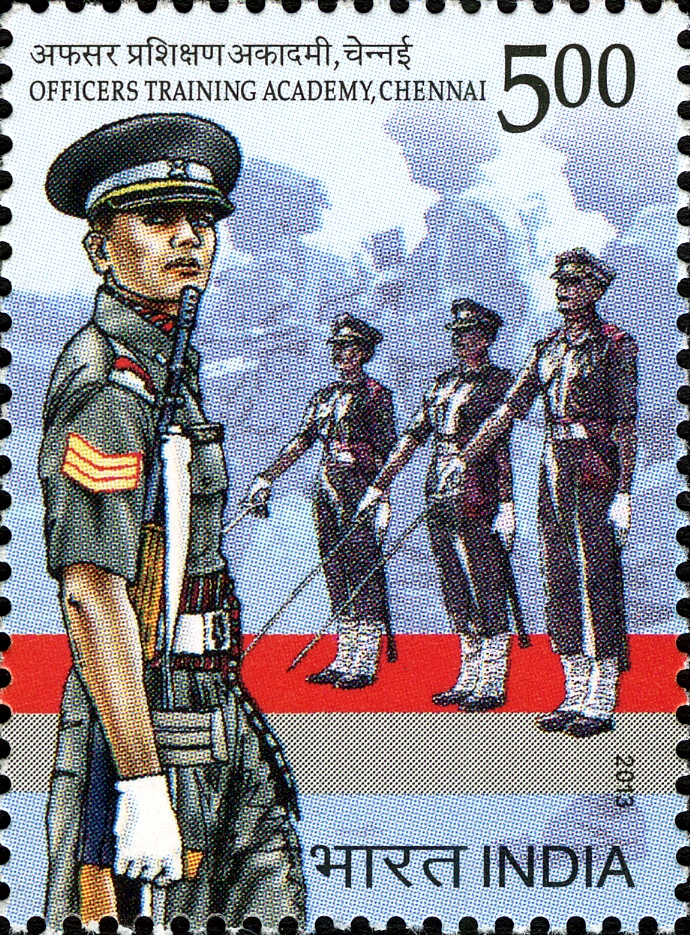
2013 stamp dedicated to the Officers Training Academy at Chennai

Seven Officers Training Schools were established in India between 1942–45 to meet the huge demand for officers to serve in the Indian and Commonwealth Armies during World War II. However, these schools were closed down at the end of the war. In 1962, following the Sino-Indian War, India identified the need to expand the number of officers for effective operations. Two Officers Training Schools (OTS) were established in Pune and Chennai to train officers for getting commissioned into the Army. The process of establishing the schools had begun in September 1962. The Chennai school was inaugurated on 15 January 1963, for nation by and with Brigadier Ram Singh as its first Commandant. The Pune school had a short run and was closed in 1964. However, the school in Chennai continued to operate, and on 2 February 1965, it obtained the sanction to shift focus to train officers for the Short Service Regular Commission. OTA Chennai is spread over 750 acres (3.0 km^{2}). The Short Service Regular Commission has evolved into the Short Service Commission, and the OTA has continued to train officers for these commissions. The school was granted permanent status in 1985. On 1 January 1988, the school was renamed as the Officers Training Academy (OTA), in tandem with the NDA and IMA.

The Presidential Colors were presented to the Academy on 18 August 1990 by R. Venkataraman, the then President of India. The first batch of 25 women to be commissioned as officers into the Army was trained at the OTA, with training commencing on 21 September 1992. Cadets go through holistic training activities in their curriculum at OTA Chennai, including auxiliary programs such as Emergency Medical Response, Search and Rescue and Hand to Hand combat from organizations such as Red Cross. Cadets are organised in 2 battalions, namely Ranjith Singh Battalion and Shivaji Battalion. Ranjith Singh Battalion consists of three companies, namely, Kohima, Jessami, and Phillora; Shivaji Battalion consists of three companies, namely, Meiktila, Naushera, and Zojila.

=== OTA Gaya ===
OTA Gaya, set up in 2011, is located amid an estate of approximately 870 acres in a hilly terrain of Paharpur at Gaya. The academy is located en route from Gaya to Bodhgaya, approx 7 km from Gaya railway station. The international airport of Gaya is adjacent to the academy. In its vicinity is Bodhgaya, an international tourism destination. Gaya Cantonment dates back to World War II, as one of the headquarters of the British Army.

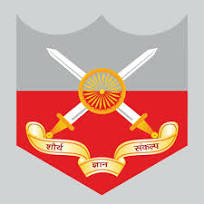
Crest of OTA Gaya

To mark the commencement of the academy, a flag-hoisting ceremony was solemnised, and the consecration of the raising of the academy was carried out in true secular tradition of the Indian Army, with recital of scriptures from holy books of different religions. The academy has been equipped with state-of-the-art training facilities, at par with other pre-commissioning training institutions. The insignia of Officers Training Academy, Gaya, has a two-colour background, with the upper half grey and the lower half blood-red, having two crossed swords superimposed with the Dharmchakra. A scroll below bears the motto of the academy – 'Shaurya, Gyan, Sankalp' in Devanagari. The academy provides basic military training to officer cadets of the Short Service Commission (Technical) course for a period of 11 months. Post the completion of basic military training, the officer cadets of SSC Tech are commissioned as officers in the Indian Army after the passing out parade. The academy has two battalions: Khetarpal battalion and Batra battalion, named after two of India's PVC awardees. Each battalion has four companies. Khetarpal battalion has Gurez, Kalidhar, Basantar, and Dograi companies, whereas Batra battalion has Tithwal, Rezangla, Hajipir, and Longewala companies. They are named after famous battles of the Indian Army.

The first batch of 149 trainee officers underwent training in the academy during the period July 2011 to Jun 2012, and the first passing out parade was conducted on 8 June 2012. The second batch, after successful completion of their training (January 2012 – December 2012), passed out on 8 December 2012. A total of 176 cadets from TES 26 and SCO 29 courses passed out on 8 December 2012. The academy has the capacity to train 350 cadets. A gap of one and a half years due to the COVID pandemic saw minimal activities during the passing-out parade. TES-38 was the first course to pass out from the portals of this academy after the hiatus. Lt Gen Vivek Kashyap, PVSM, AVSM, VSM, is the current commandant of the academy, having taken charge in September 2025.

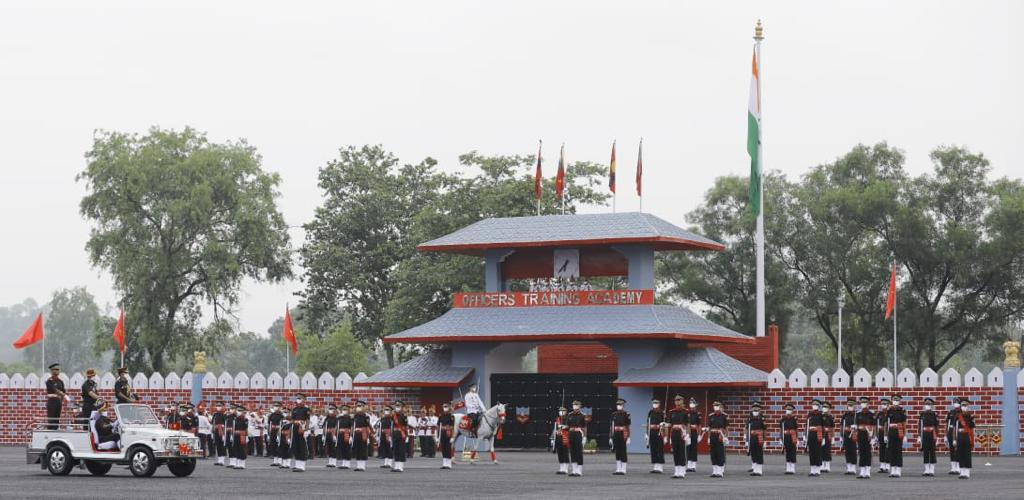
The fort wall of OTA Gaya parade ground

== Notable alumni ==
The academy has produced many war heroes and distinguished officers. Many have gone on to work for corporations after leaving the Indian Army. The OTA Alumni Association was registered under the Societies Act 1860 at Chandigarh with all India jurisdiction.

=== Param Vir Chakra ===
- Maj Ramaswamy Parameshwaran PVC

=== Ashoka Chakra ===
- Lt Col Jas Ram Singh
- Maj Gen Cyrus Addie Pithawalla AC, VSM
- Col Jasbir Singh Raina AC
- Lt Col Harsh Uday Singh Gaur
- Col Jojan Thomas
- Col D. Sreeram Kumar AC
- Lt Navdeep Singh
- Maj Mukund Varadarajan

=== Mahavir Chakra ===
- Brig Kuldip Singh Chandpuri MVC, VSM
- 2/Lt S. S. Samra
- Lt Col P.S. Ganapathi
- Col Krishna Gopal Chatterjee
- 2/Lt Rajeev Sandhu
- Maj Padmapani Acharya
- Col Sonam Wangchuk
- Col Balwan Singh
- Lt Keishing Clifford Nongrum
- Capt Pratap Singh

=== Vir Chakra ===
- Capt Jintu Gogoi
- Capt Jerry Prem Raj
- Lt Col Vikram Deuskar
- Col RS Chopra

=== Politics ===
- Maj Sunil Dutt Dwivedi - Member, 17th Legislative Assembly, Bhartiya Janata Party, Farrukhabad constituency, SS 50, Regiment of Artillery
- Capt Brijesh Chowta - Member of Parliament, 18th Lok Sabha, Bhartiya Janata Party, SS 65, Gorkha Rifles

=== Media Personalities ===
- Maj Ramon Chibb - Filmmaker, SS 50, Kumaon Regiment
- Maj Gaurav Arya - Public Speaker, SS 57, Kumaon Regiment
- Maj Mohommed Ali Shah - Actor, International TEDx speaker, Motivational Speaker, Actor, TV panelist, SS 76, Regiment of Artillery

=== Others ===
- Col Sophia Qureshi first Indian woman officer to lead an Indian Army contingent in a multinational military exercise (Exercise Force 18, 2016)
- Capt Tania Shergill became the first Indian woman Parade Adjutant to lead an all-men contingent at an Army Day function in the Indian Army.

== President's Colors ==
SS 50 Course got the honour of receiving the coveted Presidential Colors awarded to the Academy. The Colors were presented on 18 August 1990 by R. Venkataraman, the 8th President of India.

== List of Commandants ==
The Commandant of the Officers Training Academy is the overall in-charge of all the functioning of the Officers Training Academy, Chennai. The Commandant of the College is a three-star rank officer (Lieutenant General) from the Indian Army. He is supported by the Deputy Commandant and Chief Instructor (DCCI), held by a Major General.

=== OTA Chennai ===
| S.No | Rank | Name | Appointment Date | Left Office | References |
|---|---|---|---|---|---|
| 1 | Brigadier | Ram Singh | January 1963 | October 1965 | |
| 2 | Brigadier | Pritpal Singh | November 1965 | October 1967 | |
| 3 | Brigadier | A M M Nambiar | January 1966 | December 1966 | |
| 4 | Major General | I C Katoch, PVSM | March 1970 | September 1972 | |
| 5 | Brigadier | Russi Hormusji Bajina, VrC | September 1972 | January 1974 | |
| 6 | Brigadier | C M Cariappa, AVSM | January 1974 | December 1975 | |
| 7 | Brigadier | S M Suri, AVSM | January 1976 | April 1978 | |
| 8 | Brigadier | E A Thyagarajan, AVSM | April 1978 | August 1982 | |
| 9 | Major General | T S Verma, PVSM | September 1982 | January 1985 | |
| 10 | Major General | N S Nair, VSM | February 1985 | April 1986 | |
| 11 | Major General | N Viswanathan | July 1986 | December 1987 | |
| 12 | Major General | N K Oberoi | April 1990 | November 1992 | |
| 13 | Major General | V Rajaram | December 1992 | February 1995 | |
| 14 | Major General | K C Dhingra, VSM | March 1995 | June 1997 | |
| 15 | Major General | V Jayashankar | July 1997 | July 1999 | |
| 16 | Major General | G H Israni, VSM | July 1999 | July 2000 | |
| 17 | Major General | Sudhir Mohan | August 2000 | February 2003 | |
| 18 | Lieutenant General | S D Awasthi | March 2003 | September 2004 | |
| 19 | Lieutenant General | K K Kohli, AVSM, VSM | October 2004 | July 2006 | |
| 20 | Lieutenant General | R K Swamy, AVSM, VSM | October 2006 | September 2008 | |
| 21 | Lieutenant General | J S Bajwa, UYSM, SM | September 2008 | July 2010 | |
| 22 | Lieutenant General | Gautam Banerjee, PVSM, AVSM, YSM | August 2010 | July 2011 | |
| 23 | Lieutenant General | S S Jog, SM, VSM | November 2011 | October 2014 | |
| 24 | Lieutenant General | R P Sahi, AVSM | January 2015 | October 2015 | |
| 25 | Lieutenant General | Bobby Mathews, PVSM, AVSM & Bar, VSM | October 2016 | February 2017 | |
| 26 | Lieutenant General | Rajan Ravindran, VSM | March 2017 | February 2018 | |
| 27 | Lieutenant General | Sanjeev Kanal, AVSM | March 2018 | January 2021 | |
| 28 | Lieutenant General | Manik Kumar Das, PVSM, SM**, VSM | January 2021 | May 2022 | |
| 29 | Lieutenant General | Sanjeev Chauhan, AVSM, YSM | June 2022 | June 2024 | |
| 30 | Lieutenant General | Michael AJ Fernandez | June 2024 | Till Date | |

=== OTA Gaya ===
| S.No | Rank | Name | Appointment Date | Left Office | References |
|---|---|---|---|---|---|
| 1 | Lieutenant General | V Sharma, AVSM | July 2011 | December 2011 | |
| 2 | Lieutenant General | J Sikand, VSM | January 2012 | September 2012 | |
| 3 | Lieutenant General | G S Bisht, VSM | October 2012 | July 2014 | |
| 4 | Lieutenant General | R K Sharma, SM | July 2014 | October 2015 | |
| 5 | Lieutenant General | V Vashisht, VSM** | October 2015 | December 2016 | |
| 6 | Lieutenant General | R K Jagga, VSM | December 2016 | November 2017 | |
| 7 | Lieutenant General | V S Sreenivas, VSM** | November 2017 | November 2018 | |
| 8 | Lieutenant General | S Srivastava, VSM** | November 2018 | December 2020 | |
| 9 | Lieutenant General | GAV Reddy, AVSM, SC, VSM | January 2021 | April 2022 | |
| 10 | Lieutenant General | PS Minhas, PVSM, AVSM | April 2022 | September 2024 | |
| 11 | Lieutenant General | Sukriti Singh Dahiya, SM, VSM | October 2024 | Till Date | |

== In popular culture ==
- OTA : Saga of excellence, Patriot by Major Gaurav Arya
- : Women of Honour: Destination Army, by Nat Geo. The special feature follows two lady cadets through their journey at the Officer's Training Academy, where they undergo rigorous training to join the Indian Army.
- Documentary of OTA Gaya

== See also ==
- Indian National Defence University
- Military academies in India
- Sainik school
- Officers Training Academy Band
