= Vashisht =

Vashisht or Vashistha was an ancient Indian sage (rishi) and an author of the Rigveda of Hinduism.

It may also refer to:

- Vashisht, Himachal Pradesh, a village in Kulla district, Himachal Pradesh, India

== People with the name Vashisht ==
- Vashishtha Bhargava, Indian judge
- Vasishta N. Simha, Indian actor
- Vashishtha Narayan Singh (1946–2019), Indian academic
- Vashishth Tripathi, Indian professor
- Mita Vashisht (born 1967), Indian actress
- Shivank Vashisht (born 1995), Indian cricketer
- Siddharth Vashisht (born 1977, known as Manu Sharma), Indian convicted murderer
- Tushar Vashisht, Indian entrepreneur, co-founder and CEO of consumer health app HealthifyMe
- Vinod Vashisht, Indian Army general, director general of the National Cadet Corps until 2017

== See also ==
- Vasishtha Samhita, a Hindu text attributed to the sage
- Vasishtha Siddhanta, an Indian astronomical text attributed to the sage
- Yoga Vasistha, an Indian philosophical text
- Maharshi Vashishtha Autonomous State Medical College, Basti, a medical school in Uttar Pradesh, India
- Vasishtha dynasty, 5th century dynasty of eastern India
- Vasishtesvarar Temple, Karunthittaikkudi, Tamil Nadu, India
- Vasishteswarar Temple, Thittai, Tamil Nadu, India
- Vasishta Nadi, river in Tamil Nadu, India
- Vashishti River, in southern India
- Vashishtiputra (lit. 'Son of Vashishti River'), two 2nd-century Indian Satavahana dynasty kings
  - Vashishtiputra Satakarni
  - Vasishthiputra Pulumavi
- Utthita Vasisthasana, a yoga posture
