= Prakash Gokarn =

Lieutenant General Prakash Gokarn PVSM AVSM
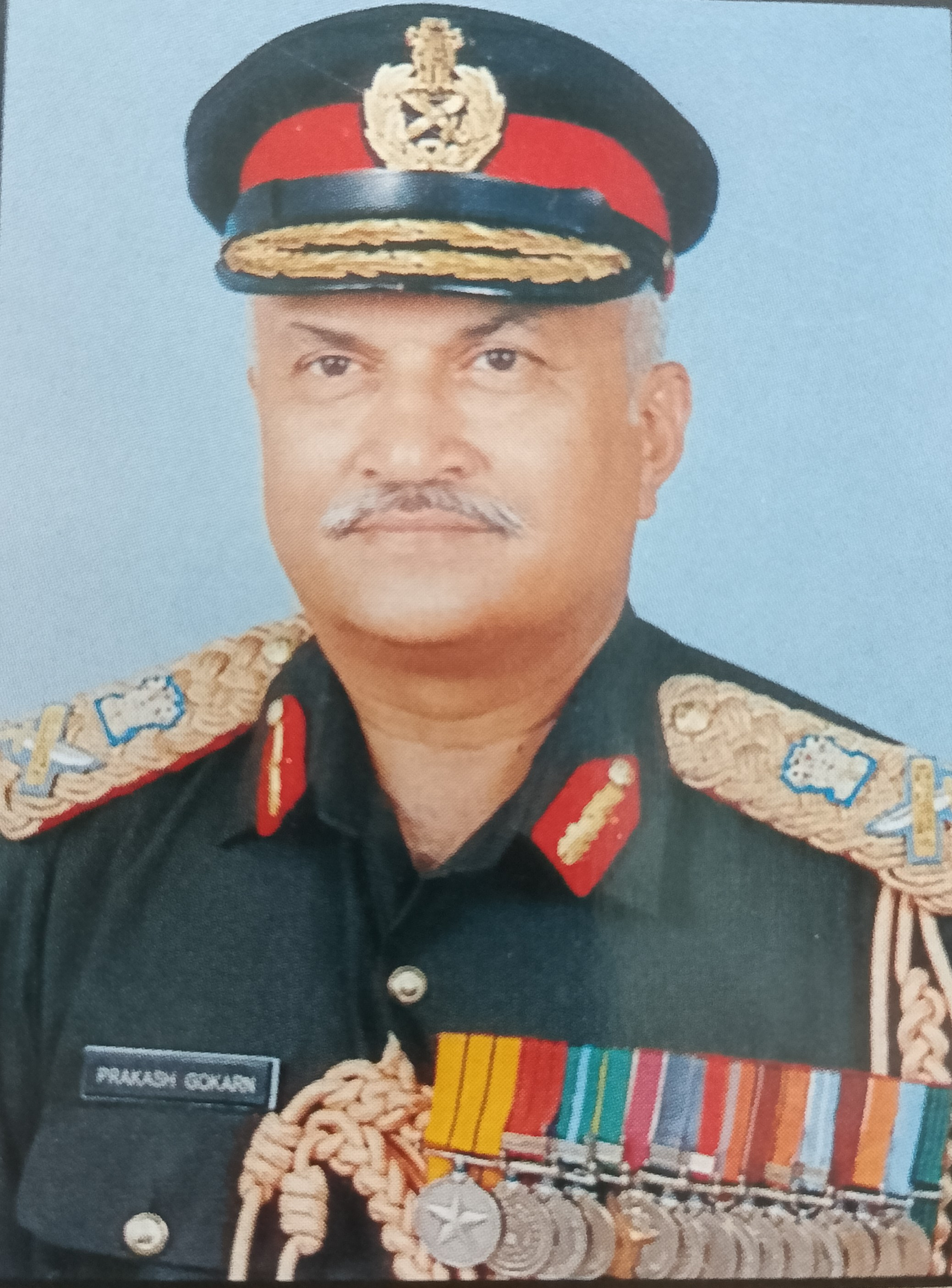
- Official portrait
- Military career
- Allegiance: India
- Branch: Indian Army
- Rank: Lieutenant General
- Unit: Corps of Signals
- Commands: Indian Army Corps of Signals Officer in Chief
- Conflicts: Indo-Pakistani War of 1965; Indo-Pakistani War of 1971; Kargil War
- Awards: Param Vishisht Seva Medal Ati Vishisht Seva Medal

Lt. Gen. Prakash Gokarn, PVSM, AVSM, was the Indian Army Corps of Signals Officer in Chief of the Indian Army. He was instrumental in synergising the tactical strategic communication for Operation Vijay in the Kargil War.

== Military achievements ==
Lt Gen Gokarn was the driving force in ensuring bandwidth availability and modernization of communications in the Army, a multi layered communication network and its integration with information warfare and networking technologies to propel the Indian Army into the 21st century. He was the Secretary of Army's Reorganization and Restructuring Expert Committee for upgrading the organisation and weapon systems of the Army.

He was awarded the Ati Vishisht Seva Medal and Param Vishisht Seva Medal for distinguished services of the most exceptional order. Lt. Gen. P. Gokarn retired on July 31, 2001. He is succeeded by Lt. Gen. D.P. Sehgal.

== Non-Military achievements ==
He was on the Board of Directors of BEL, ITI, ECIL, and Chairman of the Electronic Development Panel of the DRDO and the Joint Communications Electronics Committee of the Defence Services. He represented India at the ITU’s Plenipotentiary Conference at Minneapolis. He was appointed Chairman of the Spectrum Management Committee as part of the Government of India's Group on Telecommunication (GoT) to form the National Telecom Policy, which has since been formalized by the Government. As a senior member of the Wireless Planning Coordination Committee (WPCC), he assisted in the framing of the National Frequency Allocation Plan (NFAP).

He is currently the President of Kanara Saraswat Association.
