= Virendra Vats =

Indian Army General

Lieutenant General Virendra Vats YSM SM VSM
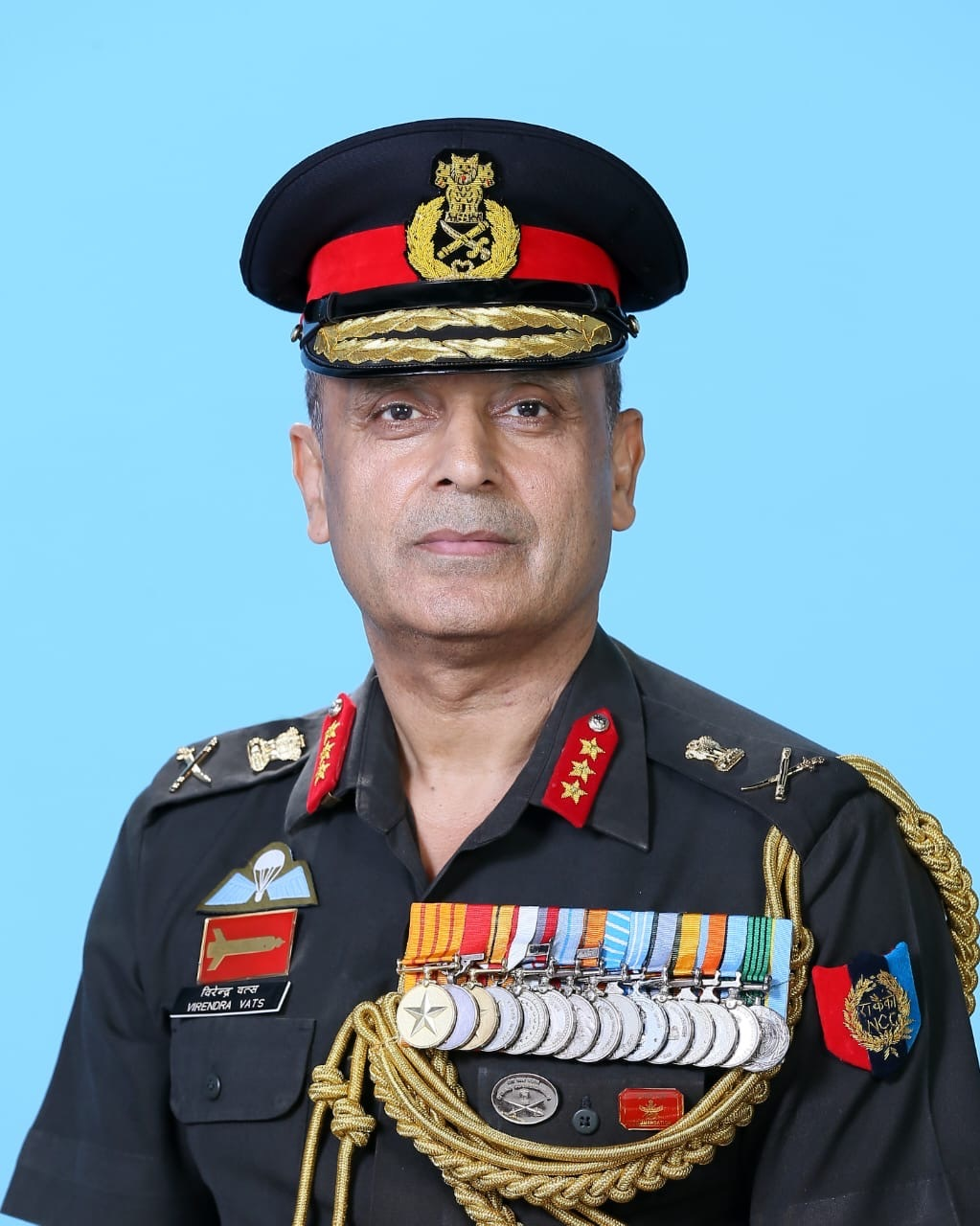
- Military career
- Allegiance: India
- Branch: Indian Army
- Service years: December 1988 – present
- Rank: Lieutenant General
- Unit: 19 Kumaon Regiment
- Commands: 19 Infantry Division; 82 Mountain Brigade; 19 Kumaon
- Awards: Yudh Seva Medal; Sena Medal; Vishisht Seva Medal

Lieutenant General Virendra Vats, YSM, SM, VSM is a serving general officer of the Indian Army. He currently serves as the Director General, National Cadet Corps. He earlier served as the Commandant of the Defence Services Staff College, Wellington.

== Early life and education ==
The general officer attended the National Defence Academy, as part of the 73rd course. He then was part of the 83rd course of the Indian Military Academy.

== Military career ==
He was commissioned into the 19th battalion, The Kumaon Regiment (19 Kumaon) in December 1988. Early in his career, he served as an instructor at the Infantry School. He subsequently attended the Defence Services Staff College, Wellington. After completing the course, he was appointed Brigade major of a mountain brigade.

In the rank of Colonel, the general officer served as the Assistant Military Secretary in the MS branch. He then commanded his battalion, 19 Kumaon, in Operation Rhino in the North East. The battalion was awarded a unit citation by the Chief of the Army Staff, General Deepak Kapoor on Army Day 2008. For his command of 19 Kumaon, he was awarded the Sena Medal (distinguished) on 26 January 2008.

After his command tenure, he moved to Army headquarters as the Director, Military Training. He subsequently attended the College of Defence Management in Secunderabad. After the course, he was appointed Defence attaché (DA) to the Commander-in-Chief, Andaman and Nicobar Command. He then served as the Director in the Military Operations directorate at Army HQ. For his tenure in the MO directorate, he was awarded the Vishisht Seva Medal as part of the Republic Day honours in 2014.

Promoted to the rank of Brigadier, he commanded the 82 Mountain Brigade, deployed along the Line of actual control in eastern Arunachal Pradesh. The brigade also was part of Operation Rhino. As part of the United Nations, he served as a military observer in the Stabilization mission in the Congo. He subsequently commanded the North Kivu brigade, in the same mission. After his return to India, Vats was selected to attend the National Defence College in New Delhi, as part of the 57th course. He was subsequently appointed Brigadier General Staff (Concepts) at the headquarters of the Army Training Command (ARTRAC). He then moved to Army headquarters as the Brigadier Military Secretary (A) - his second tenure in the MS branch.

=== General officer ===
He was promoted to the rank of Major General and appointed General officer commanding 19 Infantry Division (Dagger Division) in Baramulla on the line of control in the Kashmir Valley. For his tenure as GOC Dagger Division, he was awarded the Yudh Seva Medal on 26 January 2022. In late 2021, he moved to the Integrated Defence Staff headquarters as the Assistant Chief of Integrated Defence Staff (Training and Doctrine) (ACIDS Trg & Doc).

On 1 September 2022, he was promoted to the rank of Lieutenant General and appointed Commandant of the Defence Services Staff College. After a long tenure of three years, Vats relinquished charge of DSSC to Lieutenant General Manish Erry on 18 September 2025. On 30 September 2025, he assumed charge as the 35th Director General of the National Cadet Corps. He took over from Lieutenant General Gurbirpal Singh.

== Personal life ==
The general officer is married to Namita Vats, a human resources professional. The couple has a son Aryan.

== Awards and decorations ==
Vats was awarded the Sena Medal in 2008, the Vishisht Seva Medal in 2014, and the Yudh Seva Medal in 2022. He has also been awarded the Chief of the Army Staff's Commendation card and the Commander-in-Chief, Andaman and Nicobar Command Commendation Card.

Yudh Seva Medal	Sena Medal		Vishisht Seva Medal
Wound Medal	Special Service Medal	Operation Vijay Medal	Sainya Seva Medal
High Altitude Medal	Videsh Seva Medal	75th Independence Anniversary Medal	50th Independence Anniversary Medal
30 Years Long Service Medal	20 Years Long Service Medal	9 Years Long Service Medal	MONUSCO Medal

Military offices
Preceded by Gurbirpal Singh	Director General; National Cadet Corps; 1 October 2025 - present	Succeeded by Incumbent
Preceded by Mohan Subramaniam	Commandant; Defence Services Staff College; 1 September 2022 - 30 September 2025	Succeeded by Manish M Erry
