= Sofiya Qureshi =

Indian Army officer and peacekeeping commander

Colonel Sofiya Qureshi VSM
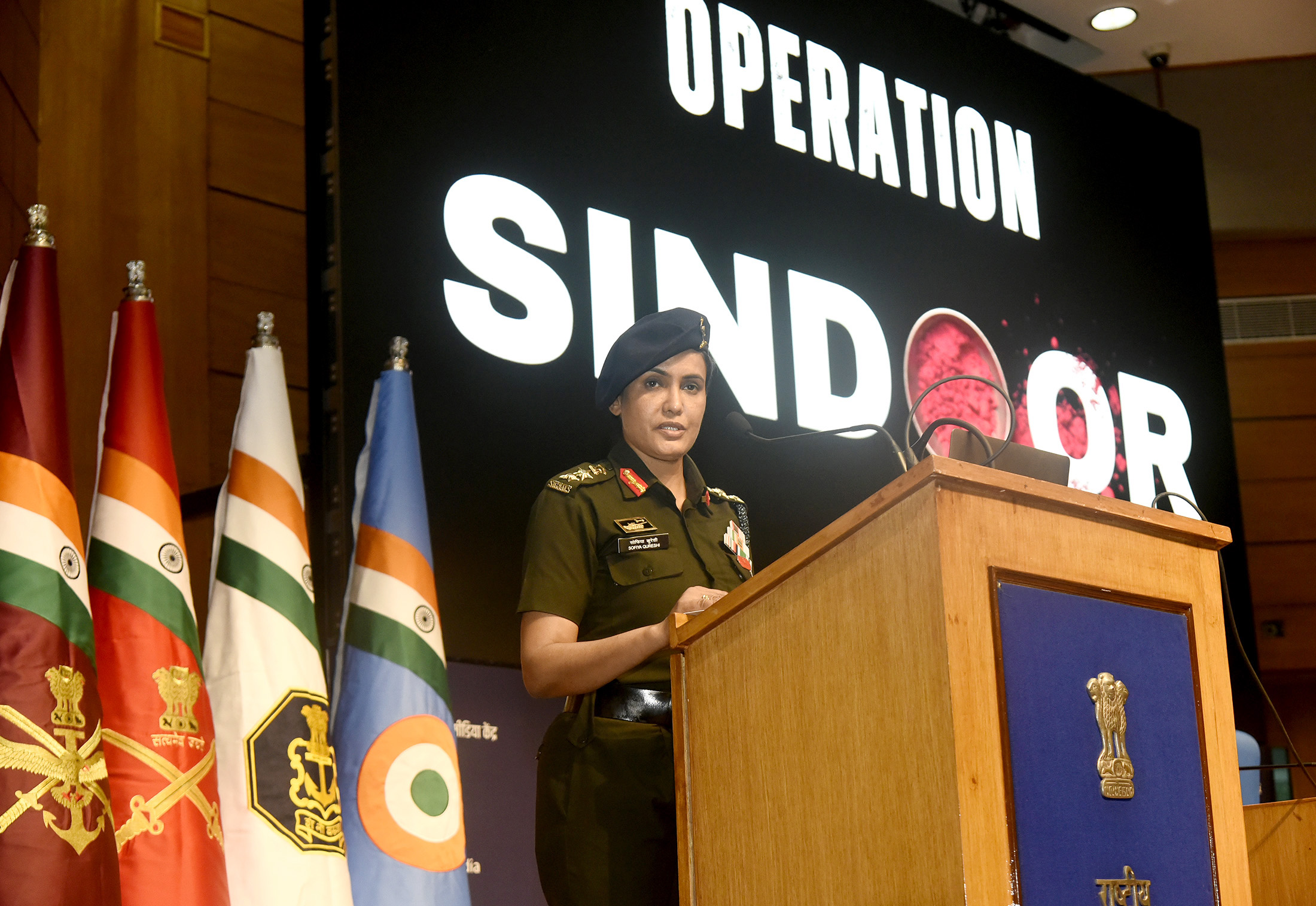
- Born: Vadodara, Gujarat, India
- Military career
- Allegiance: India
- Branch: Indian Army
- Rank: Colonel
- Service number: IC-74110K
- Unit: Army Signal Corps
- Commands: UN Peacekeeping Force (DRC); Indian Cyber Defence Command; Indian Rapid Deployment Unit
- Conflicts: 2025 India–Pakistan conflict
- Awards: VSM; Special Service Medal; Operation Vijay Medal; Operation Parakram Medal; Sainya Seva Medal; Videsh Seva Medal; 75th Independence Anniversary Medal; 20 Years Long Service Medal; 9 Years Long Service Medal; United Nations Medal; Gandhi Peace Award (2019)
- Other work: Guest faculty at National Defence College

Colonel Sofiya Qureshi, VSM is a senior officer in the Indian Army. She is notable for being the first woman to lead an Indian contingent in a United Nations peacekeeping mission and she gained national attention for her role during the 2025 India–Pakistan conflict.

== Early life and education ==
Sofiya Qureshi was born in Vadodara to Mohammad Qureshi and Amina Qureshi. She earned a degree in biotechnology at the Maharaja Sayajirao University of Baroda.

== Military education ==
- Officers Training Academy, Chennai - 1999
- Defence Services Staff College, Wellington – Master’s in Defence and Strategic Studies (2005–06)
- National Defence College, New Delhi (2018) – Strategic cybersecurity

== Military career ==
Commissioned in 1999 after graduating from the Officers Training Academy into the Army Signal Corps, Qureshi served in counter-insurgency operations in Jammu and Kashmir and North-East India. In 2001, she helped develop the Army’s first mobile digital communication network.

In 2016, as a colonel, she led 40 Indian troops during exercise Force 18—the first woman to lead an Indian training contingent.

=== Role in 2025 India–Pakistan conflict ===
Qureshi led press conferences along with Wing Commander Vyomika Singh and Foreign Secretary Vikram Misri about Operation Sindoor.

== Recognition and awards ==
- Global Peace Gandhi Award (2019)
- First Provost Marshall in her unit

== Personal life ==
She married Colonel Tajuddin Bagewadi in 2015 and together they have a son.
