= Commandant of the Defence Services Staff College =

Indian military appointment

- Crest of the College

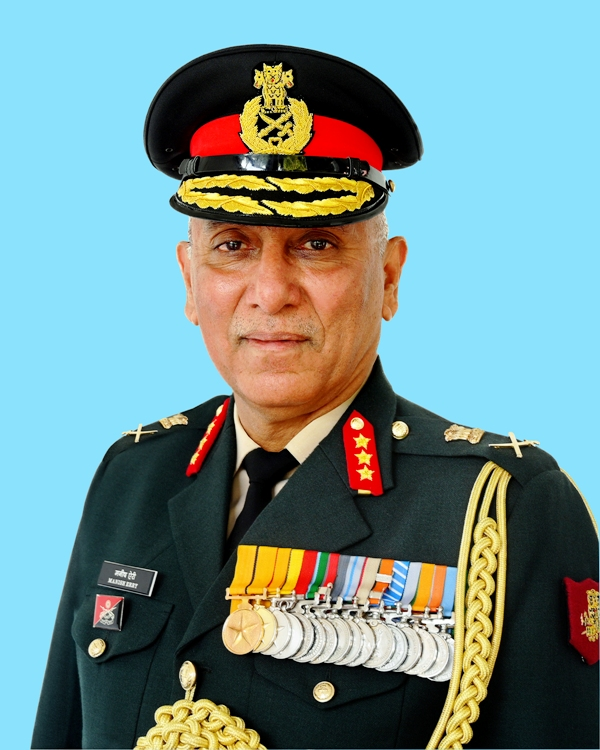
- Incumbent; Lieutenant General; Manish Erry; PVSM UYSM AVSM SM
- Type: Military
- Status: Active
- Formation: 15 August 1947; 79 years ago
- First holder: Brigadier S D Verma
- Website: www.dssc.gov.in

The Commandant of the Defence Services Staff College is the head and overall in-charge of the Defence Services Staff College. The Commandant of the Academy is a Three-star rank officer from the Indian Army. He is supported by the chief instructors of the Army, Navy and Air wings, Major General in charge of Administration (MG IC Adm) (all two-star rank appointments), Brigadier General Staff (one-star appointment) and a staff officer (SO to Comdt) (an officer of the rank of major).

The Commandant is responsible to the Chiefs of Staff Committee through the Chairman of the Joint Training Committee.

Lieutenant General Manish Erry, PVSM, UYSM, AVSM, SM is the present Commandant of the DSSC. He assumed office on 17 September 2025 from Lieutenant General Virendra Vats.

== History ==
The College was established in 1905 in Quetta (now in Pakistan). After the partition of India and Pakistan, the Indian elements of the Staff College, Quetta led by Colonel S D Verma moved to India. Promoted Brigadier and appointed as the First Commandant, Verma chose Wellington as the location of the Staff College in India. In 1948, Major General W D A Lentaigne, CB, CBE, DSO took over as the Commandant, the longest serving Commandant till date.

The appointment was upgraded to the Three-star rank of Lieutenant General in 1981.

== List of Commandants ==
This table chronicles a list of Commandants of Defence Services Staff College, Wellignton

S.No.	Name	Assumed office	Left office	Notes
1	Brigadier S D Verma	1947	1948	Established the Staff College in India
2	Major General W D A Lentaigne, CB, CBE, DSO	1948	1955	Longest serving Commandant
3	Major General P S Gyani	1955	1959	Later served as Force Commander UNEF and Force Commander UNYOM.
4	Major General P P Kumaramangalam, DSO	1959	1959	Later served as the Vice Chief of the Army Staff and the 6th Chief of the Army Staff
5	Major General Sam Manekshaw, MC	1959	1962	Later served as the 7th Chief of the Army Staff. India's first Field Marshal.
6	Major General D Som Dutt	1962	1965	Later served as the First Director of MP-IDSA.
7	Major General Har Prasad	1965	1968	Later served as the Vice Chief of the Army Staff
8	Major General R K Ranjit Singh	1968	1972	
9	Major General S P Malhotra, PVSM	1972	1975	Later served as the General Officer Commanding-in-Chief Northern Command.
10	Major General A M Sethna, AVSM	1975	1978	Later served as the Vice Chief of the Army Staff
11	Major General Mohinder Singh	1978	1982	
12	Lieutenant General K Balaram, PVSM	1982	1984	
13	Lieutenant General Mahipat Sinhji, PVSM	1984	1986	
14	Lieutenant General F. N. Billimoria, PVSM	1986	1987	Later served as the General Officer Commanding-in-Chief Central Command
15	Lieutenant General Gurinder Singh, AVSM	1987	1989	
16	Lieutenant General K S Brar, PVSM, AVSM, VrC	1989	1990	Later served as the General Officer Commanding-in-Chief Eastern Command
17	Lieutenant General Y K Vadehra, AVSM	1990	1992	
18	Lieutenant General B S Nalwa, PVSM	1992	1994	
19	Lieutenant General V P Malik, AVSM	1994	1995	Later served as the 19th Chief of the Army Staff
20	Lieutenant General Baldev Singh, PVSM, AVSM	1995	1997	
21	Lieutenant General A S Rao, PVSM, AVSM	1997	1999	
22	Lieutenant General S R R Aiyengar, PVSM, AVSM	1999	2001	Earlier served as Commandant of the National Defence College
23	Lieutenant General P P S Bindra, PVSM, AVSM, VSM	2001	2003	
24	Lieutenant General T P S Brar, PVSM, YSM	2003	2006	
25	Lieutenant General B J Gupta, AVSM	2006	2008	
26	Lieutenant General H P S Klair, SM	2008	2010	
27	Lieutenant General B V Nair	2010	2011	
28	Lieutenant General Chander Prakash, SM, VSM	2011	2013	
29	Lieutenant General S K Gadeock, AVSM	2013	2017	
29	Lieutenant General Amrik Singh, AVSM, SM	2017	2019	
30	Lieutenant General Y V K Mohan, AVSM, SM, VSM	2019	2020	Earlier served as Commandant of the National Defence College
31	Lieutenant General MJS Kahlon, AVSM	2020	2022	
32	Lieutenant General S Mohan, AVSM, SM, VSM	2022	2022	
33	Lieutenant General Virendra Vats YSM, SM, VSM	1 September 2022	17 September 2025	
34	Lieutenant General Manish Erry, PVSM, UYSM, AVSM, SM	18 September 2025	Incumbent	

== See also ==
- Commandant of the National Defence College
- Commandant of Indian Naval Academy
- Commandant of the Indian Military Academy
