= Tania Shergill =

Indian Army Officer

Captain Tania Shergill
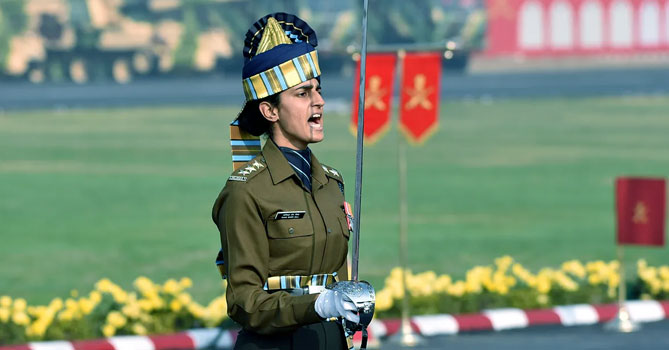
- Shergill at the Army Day parade
- Born: Hoshiarpur, Punjab
- Education: Officers Training Academy, Chennai; Nagpur University, Nagpur
- Military career
- Allegiance: India
- Branch: Indian Army
- Rank: Captain
- Unit: Corps of Signals

Captain Tania Shergill is the first Indian woman Parade Adjutant to lead an all-man contingent at an Army Day function in Indian Army, Republic Day (India) in 2020.

== Early life and education ==
She is a graduate of Officers Training Academy in Chennai. Shergill is serving at 1-Signal Training Centre in Jabalpur. She was commissioned into the Indian Army Corps of Signals in 2017.

=== Family background ===
Shergill belongs to an Indian Army family background where her father served the 101 Medium Regiment (Artillery) and later in Central Reserve Police Force where he was awarded with a PPMG. Shergill's grandfather served in the 14th Armoured Regiment (Scinde Horse). Her great grandfather was in the Sikh Regiment. Shergill also led the Army's contingent during the Republic Day parade in 2021.

=== Education ===
Shergill holds a B.Tech. degree in electronics and telecommunications from Nagpur University.

== Appreciation ==
- A video of Tania's parade was shared by business tycoon Anand Mahindra on social media captioning 'This should trend'
- Amitabh Bacchan shared a post on Twitter congratulating Shergill and captioned the post ". the pride of India .. Capt Tanya Shergill .. what a moment .. !"

== Interviews ==
- Interview | You grow so much as a person in the army: Captain Tania Shergill
- Video interview with Doordarshan National| An interview with Capt. Tania Shergill
