= GAV Reddy =

Lieutenant General GAV Reddy AVSM, SC, VSM
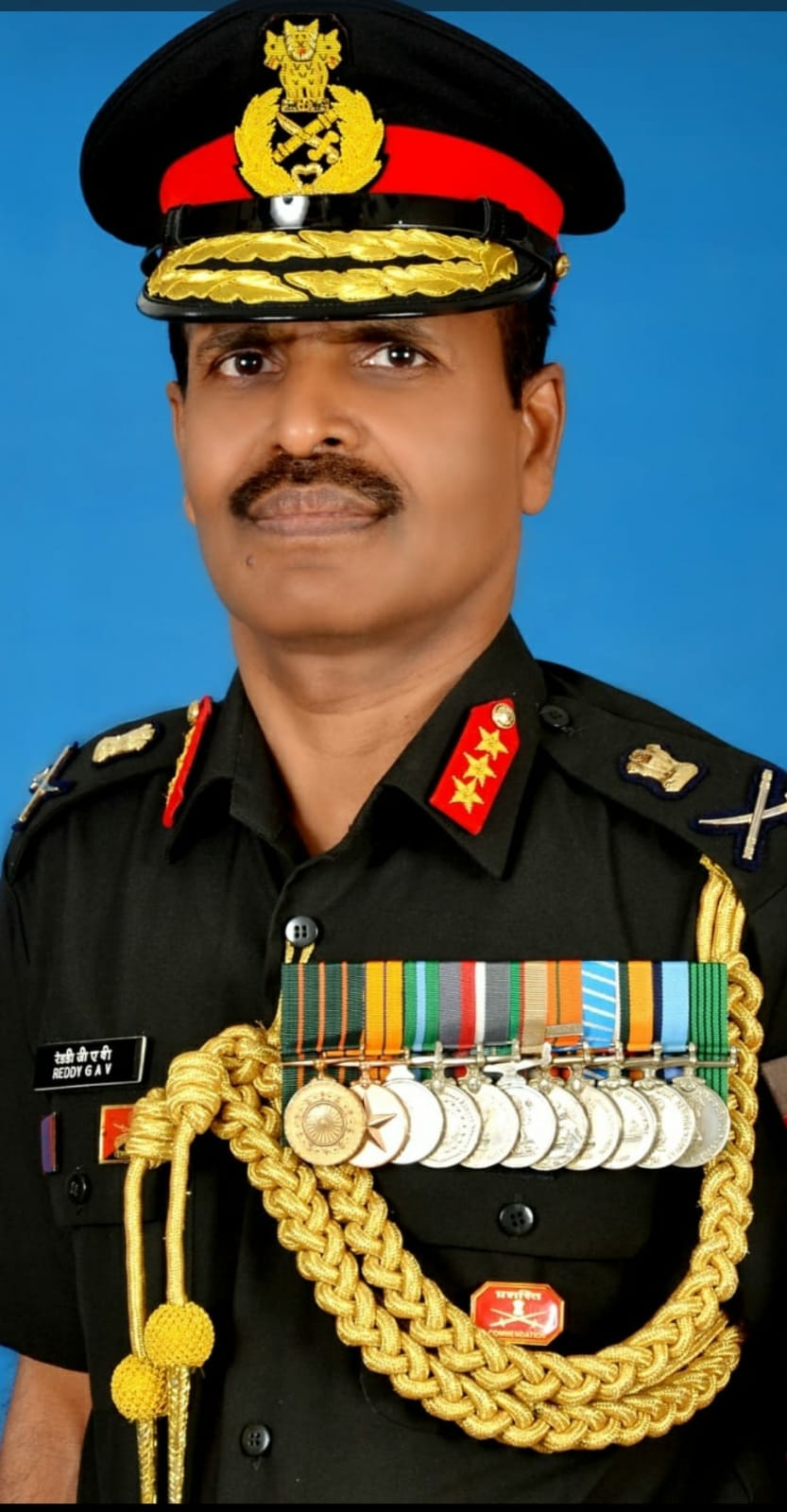
- Education: Officers Training Academy, Chennai; Defence Services Staff College, Wellington
- Military career
- Intelligence: Indian Army
- Service years: 8 March 1986 - 31 March 2023
- Unit: 9 Jat Regiment
- Commands: Officers Training Academy Gaya, IGAR East
- Awards: Ati Vishisht Seva Medal, Shaurya Chakra, Vishisht Seva Medal

Lieutenant General GAV Reddy, AVSM, SC, VSM is a retired general officer of the Indian Army. He served as the Director General of Defence Intelligence Agency (India).

He earlier served as the Commandant of the Officers Training Academy Gaya. As a major general, Reddy as the Inspector General Assam Rifles (East) (IGAR East), at Silchar.

He is an alumnus of Officers Training Academy Chennai and was commissioned into the Jat Regiment on 8 March 1986.
