= Samyukta electronic warfare system =

Indian integrated electronic warfare system

Samyukta (lit. 'United') is a mobile integrated electronic warfare system. Touted to be the largest electronic warfare system in India, it was developed jointly by DRDO, Bharat Electronics Limited, Electronics Corporation of India Limited, and Corps of Signals of Indian Army. The System is fully mobile and is meant for tactical battlefield use. It covers wide range of frequencies and coverage of electromagnetic spectrum is handled by the communication segment and the non-communication segment. Its functions include various ELINT, COMINT and electronic attack (ECM) activities.

== Description ==
Each system operates on 145 ground mobile vehicles which has three communication and two non-communication segments and can cover an area of 150 km by 70 km. System has the capability for surveillance, analysis, interception, direction finding, and position fixing, listing, prioritising and jamming of all communication and radar signals from HF to MMW.

== Development ==
The development of the system was led by Defence Electronics Research Laboratory, Bharat Electronics Limited, Electronics Corporation of India Limited, Corps of Signals of Indian Army and private companies like Data Patterns India Ltd (Chennai), CMC and Tata Power Company Ltd. Strategic Electronics Division (Tata Power SED). Around 40 companies also contributed by producing various components indigenously. Aatre said that the challenge was to tackle the sanctions imposed by the United States after 1998 nuclear tests conducted by India which banned the import of advanced electronic components. CMC and Tata Power SED jointly developed Command and Control Software having 10 million lines of code even though project was not attractive commercially.
