= Military College of Telecommunication Engineering =

Indian training college

Military College for Telecommunication Engineering
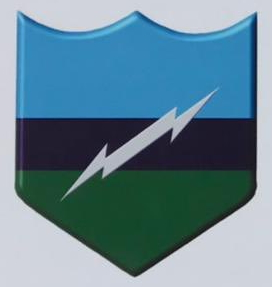
- Established: 1 October 1967; 58 years ago
- Head: Lt Gen Vivek Dogra
- Owner: Ministry of Defence, Government of India
- Location: Dr Ambedkar Nagar, Madhya Pradesh, India
- Coordinates: 22.535°N 75.763°E
- Interactive map of Military College for Telecommunication Engineering

The Military College of Telecommunication Engineering (MCTE) is the engineering training establishment for the Corps of Signals, established 1911, of the Indian Army. It is located near Indore, in the town formerly known as Mhow, now called Dr Ambedkar Nagar, in Madhya Pradesh. Lt Gen Praveen Bakshi is the present Military College of Telecommunication Engineering (MCTE) Commandant.
