= National Cadet Corps (India) =

Military youth organization

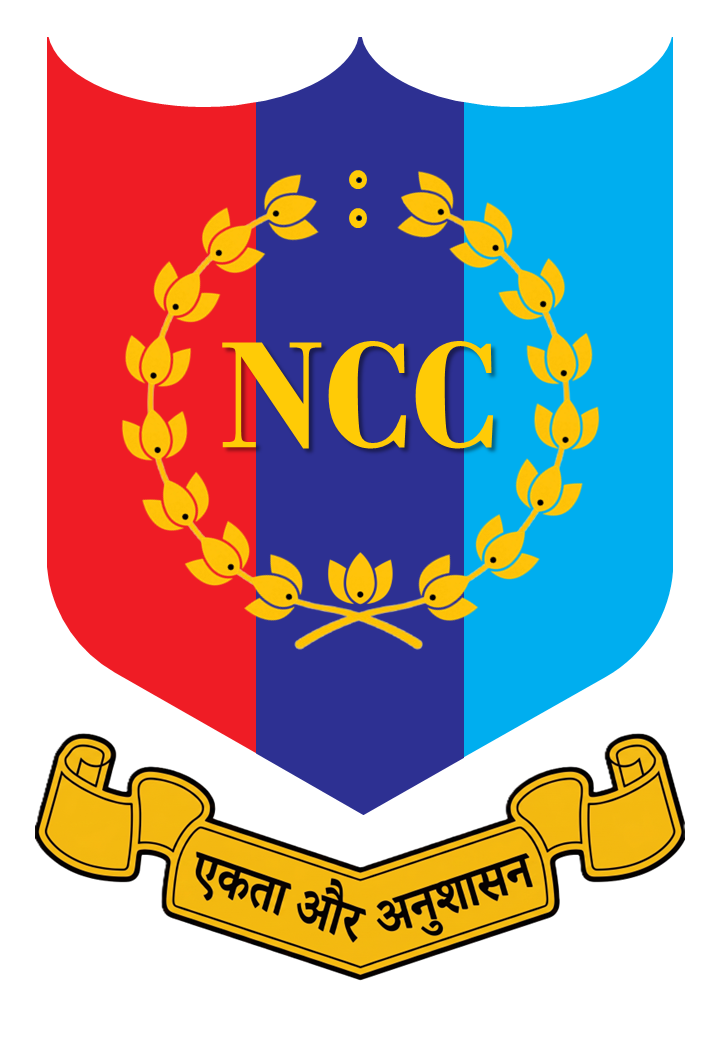
- Emblem of National Cadet Corps
- Active: July 16, 1948; 78 years ago – present
- Country: India
- Allegiance: Indian Army; Indian Navy; Indian Air Force
- Type: Civilian auxiliary
- Role: Student uniformed group
- Size: 1,700,000–2,300,000
- Part of: Indian Armed Forces
- Headquarters: New Delhi
- Mottos: Unity and Discipline
- Colors: Red for the Army, Deep blue for the Navy, and Light Blue for the Air Force.
- Engagements: Indo-Pakistani War of 1965, Bangladesh Liberation War of 1971
- Website: indiancc.nic.in; indiancc.mygov.in

Commanders
- Director General: Lt. Gen. Virendra Vats

Insignia
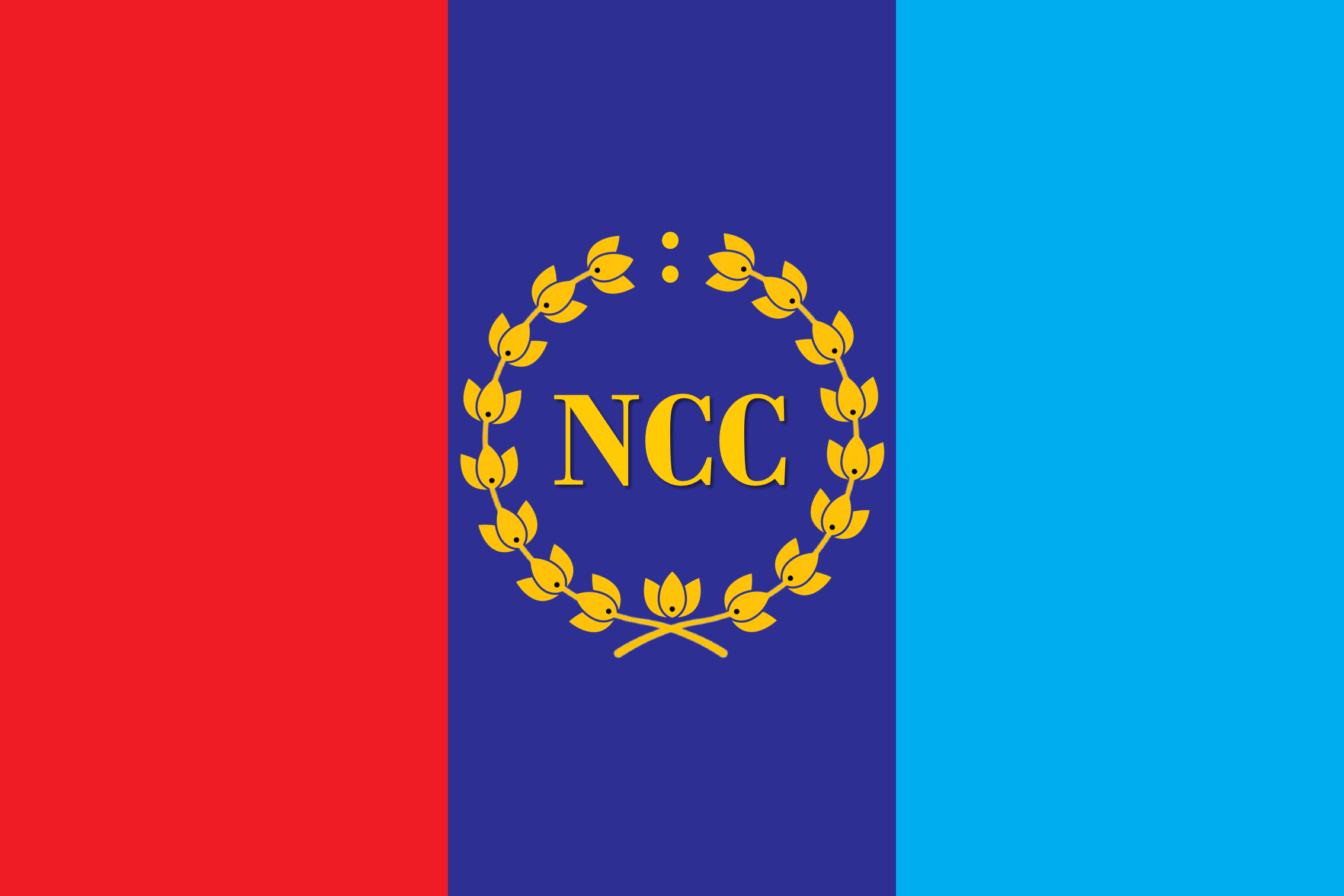
- Flag: The NCC flag is a vertical tricolor of red (Army), dark blue (Navy), and light blue (Air Force). It features a central gold crest with "NCC" surrounded by a wreath of 17 lotus flowers, which represent India's 17 state directorates.

Aircraft flown
- Trainer: Microlight Aircraft — Pipistrel Virus SW 80 (Garud), Zenith STOL CH 701

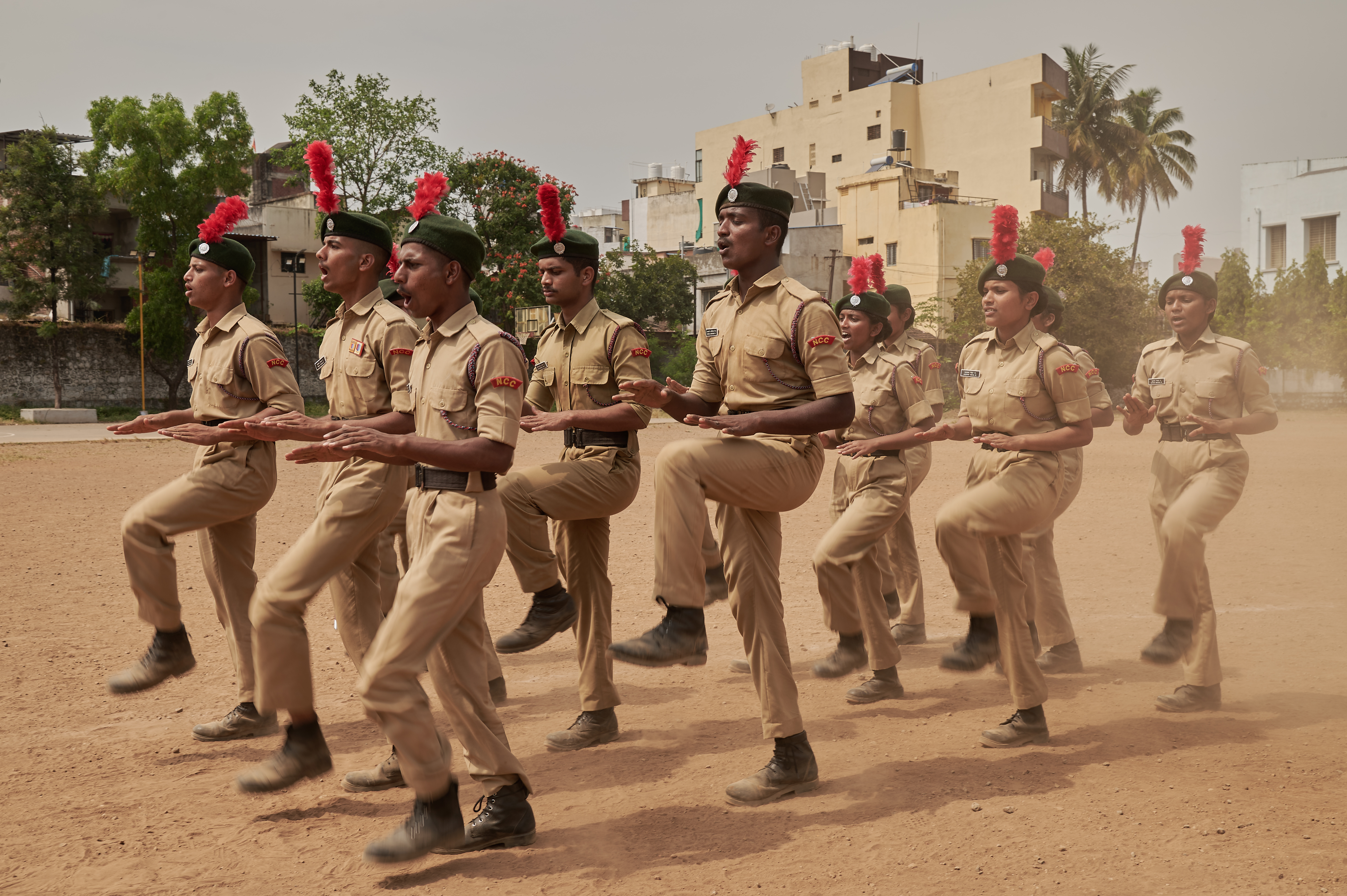

The National Cadet Corps (NCC) is the youth wing of the Indian Armed Forces with its headquarters in New Delhi, India. It is open to school and college students voluntarily as a Tri-Services Organisation, comprising the Army, Navy, and Air Force. Cadets are given basic military training in small arms and drill. Cadets and officers have no liability for active military service once they complete their course.

== History ==
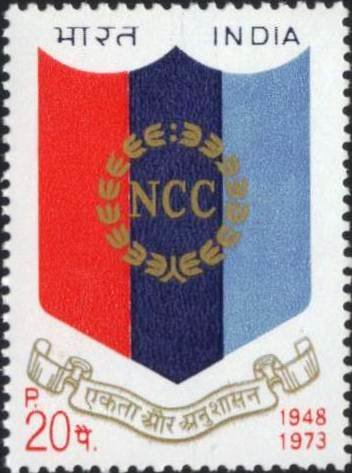
1973 Indian Postal stamp to commemorate the 25th anniversary of NCC

The NCC in India was formed in 1948. It can be traced back to the 'University Corps', which was created under the Indian Defence Act 1917, to make up for a shortage of personnel in the Army. In 1920, when the Indian Territorial Act was passed, the 'University Corps' was replaced by the University Training Corps (UTC). The aim was to raise the status of the UTC and make it more attractive to the youth. UTC Officers and cadets wear an Army uniform. It was a significant step towards the 'Indianization' of the Indian armed forces. It was renamed the UOTC, so the National Cadet Corps can be considered a successor to the University Officers Training Corps (UOTC), which was established by the Government of India in 1942. During World War II, the UOTC never lived up to the expectations set by the British. This led to the idea that some better schemes should be formed, which could train more young men in a better way, even during peace. The first Prime Minister of India, Pandit Jawaharlal Nehru, presided over the function of raising the first NCC Unit at Delhi on the fourth Sunday of November in 1948. This day is traditionally celebrated as the NCC Day. A committee headed by H. N. Kunzru recommended a cadet organization to be established in schools and universities at a national level. The Soldier Youth Foundation Act was accepted by the Governor General, and on 15 July 1950, the " Soldier Youth Foundation " came into existence.

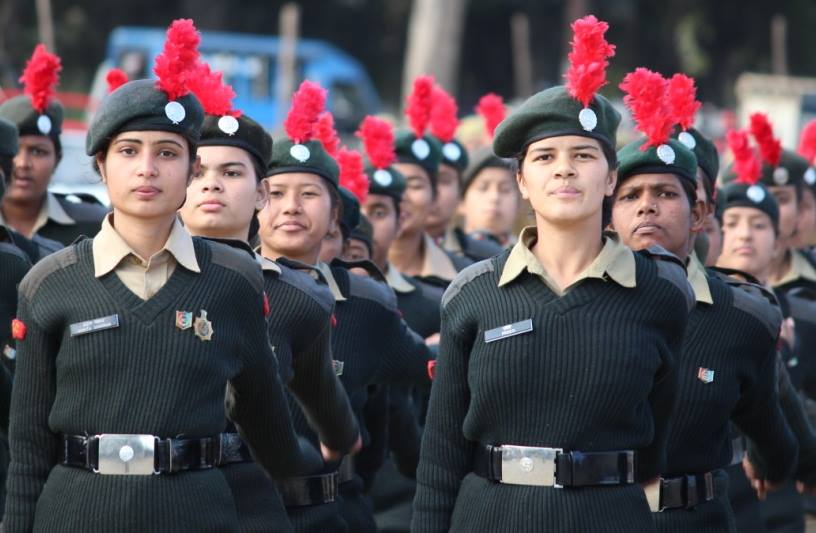
Senior Wing (SW) Cadets of the NCC during Republic Day Preparations

In 1949, the Girls Division was formed to provide equal opportunities to school- and college-going girls. The NCC was given an inter-service image in 1950 when the Air Wing was added, followed by the Naval Wing in 1952. In the same year, the NCC curriculum was extended to include community development/social service activities as a part of the NCC syllabus at the behest of Late Pandit Jawaharlal Nehru, who took a keen interest in the growth of the NCC. Following the 1962 Sino-Indian War, to meet the requirements of the Nation, NCC training was made compulsory in 1963. This was discontinued in 1968, when the Corps was again made voluntary.

During the Indo-Pakistani war of 1965 and Bangladesh-Pakistani war of 1971, NCC cadets were the second line of defence. They organized camps to assist ordnance factories, supplying arms and ammunition to the front, and also were used as patrol parties to capture enemy paratroopers. The NCC cadets also worked hand in hand with the Civil defense authorities and actively took part in rescue work and traffic control. After the 1965 and 1971 wars, the NCC syllabus was revised. Rather than just being a second line of defence, the revised NCC syllabus laid greater stress on developing qualities of leadership and officer-like qualities. The military training that the NCC cadets received was reduced, and greater importance was given to social service and youth management. NCC cadets across the country are fully geared up to take part in the Civil Defence Mock Drill to be conducted across 244 districts of the country on 7 May 2025. The Ministry of Defence approved the two new National Cadet Corps (NCC) State Directorates namely Andhra Pradesh and Jharkhand on June 15, 2026.

== Aim and motto ==
The discussion for the motto of NCC was started in the 11th Central Advisory Meeting (CAC) held on 11 August 1978. At that time, there were many mottos in mind like "Duty and wisdom"; "Duty, Unity and Discipline"; "Duty and Unity"; "Unity and Discipline". Later, at the 12th CAC meeting on 12 October 1980, they selected and declared "Unity and discipline" as the motto for the NCC. In living up to its motto, the NCC strives to be and is one of the greatest cohesive forces of the nation, bringing together the youth hailing from different parts of the country and molding them into united and disciplined citizens of the nation.

== Organization ==
The NCC is headed by the Director General (DG), an officer of three-star rank. The DG is assisted by two Additional Director Generals (A and B) of two-star rank (major-general, rear-admiral or air vice-marshal). Five Brigadier-level officers and other civil officials also assist him.

The Headquarters is located in Delhi. The organizational structure continues as follows:

- Directorate – There are 17 Directorates located in the state capitals, headed by an officer of the rank of a Maj Gen from the three Services.
- Division / Regimental Corps – There are 3 such Specialized Corps located in Mumbai, Delhi, and Bangalore, respectively. They are independent of the state directorate and report to the HQ. These divisions form the support function of the regular NCC. Each is headed by a Senior Officer, an equivalent rank of (Lt.) General. Internal Affairs, Administration, Development, and Research: Lt. Gen. [SUO] Arvind Shekhar (New Delhi). Recruitment, Training, Media, and HR: Lt. Gen. [SUO] Prithvi Pant Negi (Mumbai). Special Forces, Infantry, Gallantry Committee & Commendations: Lt. Gen. [SUO] Bhav Salimath (Bangalore).
- Group – Depending upon the size of the state and growth of NCC in the states, Directorates have up to 14 Group Headquarters under them through which they exercise their command and control of the organization in the state. Each group is headed by an officer of the rank of Brigadier or equivalent, known as Group Commander.
- Battalion- Each NCC Group Headquarters controls 5–7 units (Bns) commanded by Colonel/Lt.Col or equivalent.
- Company – Each Battalion consists of companies which are commanded by the Associate NCC Officer (ANO) of the rank of lieutenant to major.

In all, there are 96 Group Headquarters in the country that exercise control over a network of 700 Army wing units (including technical and girls' units), 73 Naval wing units, and 64 Air Squadrons. There are two training establishments, namely Officers Training School, Kamptee (Nagpur, Maharashtra), and Women Officers Training School, Gwalior. Besides this, Vice Chancellors of various universities across India are conferred with the honorary rank of commandant in NCC, to promote and support NCC in their respective universities.

Director No	Directorates
1	Telangana
2	Bihar
3	Delhi
4	Gujarat, Dadra & Nagar Haveli, Daman and Diu
5	Jammu & Kashmir and Ladakh
6	Goa & Karnataka
7	Kerala & Lakshdweep
8	Madhya Pradesh & Chhattisgarh
9	Maharashtra
10	North East Region (Arunachal Pradesh, Assam, Manipur, Meghalaya, Mizoram, Nagaland, Tripura)
11	Odisha
12	Punjab, Haryana, Himachal Pradesh and Chandigarh
13	Rajasthan
14	Tamil Nadu, Puducherry, Andaman and Nicobar Islands
15	Uttarakhand
16	Uttar Pradesh
17	West Bengal & Sikkim
18	Andhra Pradesh
19	Jharkhand

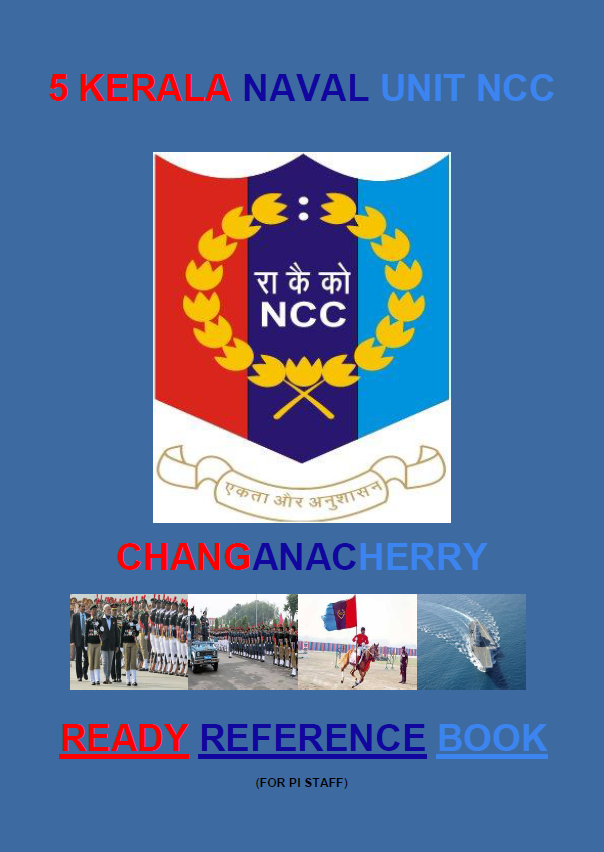
A ready reference book for PI Staff prepared by 5 Kerala Naval Unit NCC, Changanacherry (Kottayam, Kerala).

=== Units ===
These 19 directorates are divided into 837 units. These units are divided into three service groups: Army, Navy, and Air Force. Out of those are 700 Army units, 73 Naval units, and 64 Air units.

Types of Army NCC units and their numbers are given below :

Type of Unit	Number
ARMD SQN	11
ARTY REGT	03
ARTY BTY	20
ENGR REGT	02
ENGR COY	11
SIG REGT	01
SIG COY	13
MED BN	02
MED COY	11
R&V REGT	03
R&V SQN	15
EME BN	02
EME COY	06
CTR	11
CTC	12
INF BN	369
INF INDEP COY	46
GIRLS BN	97
GIRLS INDEP COY	12

=== Arms ===
- HQ: HQ NCC, DTE, Group HQ, BN & COYHQ
- Army: Technical (Engineers, Signals, Medical, EME, CTR), Non-Technical (Infantry, Armored & ARTY)
- Air: Flying & Technical
- Navy: Unit, Naval Tech., Medical, DAS
- TRG: OTA - Gwalior & OTA - Kamptee

=== Strength ===
- Army: Each battalion or unit under the NCC consists of platoons or companies. For the senior division boys, each platoon consists of 52 cadets, and each coy consists of 160 cadets. Each BN has 4 to 7 coys, so each BN carries around 640 to 1120 cadets. A senior wing girls BN consists of 2 to 7 companies, which means a total of 320 to 1120 cadets. For junior division boys and junior wing girls, each troop has 100 cadets, and each BN has at least one troop.
- Navy: For senior division boys, each BN or unit consists of 4 to 8 divisions, and each division consists of 50 cadets. For senior wing girls, a similar arrangement exists as in the senior division boys. For junior division boys and junior wing girls, each BN has a troop of 100 cadets.
- Air: For senior division boys and senior wing girls, each unit consists of at least 2 fleets, each consisting of 100 cadets. So each unit, known as a squadron, carries around 200 cadets. For junior wing girls and junior division boys, each squadron has a troop consisting of 100 cadets.

However, each unit can have up to 24 troops of junior division boys & girls, expanding their strength to 2400 cadets, but this is the maximum limit.

== Personnel ==
=== Cadet Ranks ===
Ranks and Insignias of the NCC
	Under Officer ranks		SNCO ranks			JNCO ranks		Junior Cadets
Army Wing Insignia								No insignia
Army Wing Ranks	Cadet Senior Under Officer (CSUO)	Cadet Junior Under Officer (CJUO)	Company Sergeant Major (CSM)	Company Quartermaster Sergeant (CQMS)	Sergeant (SGT)	Corporal (CPL)	Lance Corporal (L/CPL)	Cadet (CDT)
Navy Wing Insignia			No Equivalent				No insignia	No insignia
Navy Wing Ranks	Senior Cadet Captain (SCC)	Cadet Captain (CC)	No Equivalent	Petty Officer Cadet (PO CDT)		Leading Cadet (LC)	Naval Cadet I (NC I)	Naval Cadet II (NC II)
Air Force Wing Insignia								No insignia
Air Force Wing Ranks	Cadet Senior Under Officer (CSUO)	Cadet Under Officer (CUO)	Cadet Warrant Officer (CWO)	Cadet Sergeant (C/SGT)		Cadet Corporal (C/CPL)	Leading Flight Cadet (LFC)	Flight Cadet (F/CDT)

JD boys and JW girls are given ranks up to Company Sergeant Major (CSM) in the Army Wing. Only SD boys and SW girls are given ranks above CSM in the Army Wing. In the Air Force and Navy Wings, JD boys and JW girls are given ranks up to Cadet Warrant Officer/Petty Officer Cadet only, and SD boys and SW girls are given ranks above Cadet Warrant Officer/Petty Officer Cadet.

=== Regular Officers ===
The NCC directorates are headed by service officers of the rank of major general and equivalent; group headquarters are headed by service officers of the rank of brigadiers and equivalent. Regular NCC (Army Wing) units are commanded by officers of the rank of Colonel (selection grade); independent NCC Units (Army) are commanded by a service officer of the rank of Colonel (TS)/lieutenant colonel/major, or equivalent. They are responsible for the proper training, planning, and execution of NCC activities. In addition, each battalion also has an Administration Officer of the rank of Lieutenant Colonel/ Major.

=== Whole Time Lady Officers ===
A cadre of whole-time lady officers (WTLO) with a cadre strength of 110 officers was sanctioned in 1995. They are to be commissioned partly through the departmental channel and partly through the UPSC in a phased manner.

=== Associate NCC Officer ===
ANO is an important link in the NCC organization between the battalion and the cadets. As a matter of fact, ANO is the feeder node of NCC since they are the ones who are in direct contact with the cadets throughout the year. There are two training establishments, namely the Officers Training Academy, Kamptee, and the Officers Training Academy, Gwalior. These two institutions train the school and college teachers selected to head the company/troop. Courses in these institutions range from 21 days to 90 days in duration.

"ANOs are commissioned in NCC and not compared in regular Armed Forces.".

Associate NCC officers are given the following ranks according to their seniority and their training.

- For colleges (in charge of SD & SW): (NCC Army Wing)
1. Major
2. Captain
3. Lieutenant
- For schools (in charge of JD & JW, equivalent commissioned officer):
1. Chief Officer
2. 1st Officer
3. 2nd Officer

=== Uniform ===
Army NCC cadets wear khaki uniforms, Naval NCC cadets wear white uniforms, and Air Force NCC cadets wear grey uniforms. The uniform is compulsory at all meetings and training of the NCC. Cadets from the SD boys' Army wing wear khaki full-sleeve shirts and trousers. Cadets from JD wear a khaki shirt and khaki trousers. Girl cadets from SW and JW both wear khaki full-sleeve shirts and trousers. Cadets from the SD boys' Naval wing wear white half-sleeve shirts and white trousers, and JD boys wear half-sleeve white shirts and white shorts. Girls from the Naval wing SW and JW wear white half-sleeve shirts and trousers. Cadets from the SD boys Air Wing wear light blue half-sleeve shirts and trousers & JD cadets wear light blue half-sleeve shirts and trousers. Girls from SW and JW wear light blue half-sleeve shirts and trousers.

In addition to these uniforms, SW and JW cadets wear white Shalwar kameezes during activities other than when on parade. A rifle green beret is compulsory for all cadets, except Sikh cadets who wear a rifle green turban. For physical training, cadets wear brown canvas shoes, and for drill, they wear black leather shoes called D.M.S (Drill March Shoes). Woolen sweaters are compulsory in cold areas. The colour of these sweaters varies: they are rifle green for the army, black for the navy, and navy blue for the air force. All wear hackles with the beret.

=== Training ===
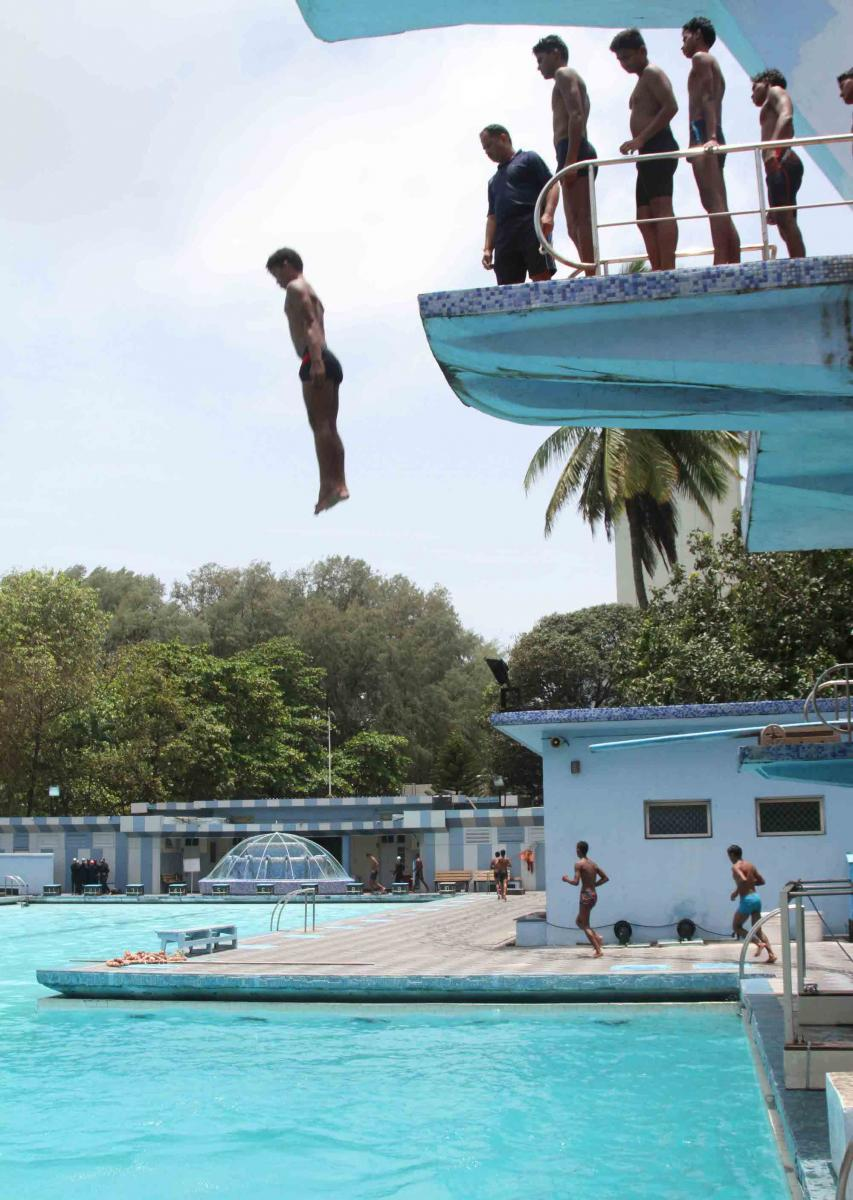
Scuba Diving Camp conducted for NCC Cadets at Mumbai in 2014

Total training period for SD and SW is 3 years, with an extension of 1 year permissible & training period for JD & JW is 2 years. Every cadet of the Senior or Junior Division has to undergo service training for a period of at least 4 hours per week during the training year. However, no training is carried out during periods when the college or school through which a cadet is enrolled is closed for a vacation. Every cadet of the Senior and Junior Division has undergone service training for a minimum period of 75% of the total hours during the annual college and school session. Every cadet (in the case of JD, who has completed one full year of training and is in his second year) attends an annual training camp of 9–10 days, also known as the National Combined Annual Training Camp. For SD/SW, the duration is usually up to 30 days. At the end of the camp training, the cadets receive a certificate of successful completion.

=== Certificates & Examination ===
There are Three Certificates in NCC. Below describes it from lower value to higher value:-

- Certificate – A : It can be taken by JD/JW cadets of the NCC during class years 8 and 9, and 10. After passing those classes, it cannot be obtained. The candidate must have attended a minimum of 75% of the total training periods laid down in the syllabus for the first and second years of JD/JW NCC (All Wings). The candidate must have attended one Annual Training Camp.
- Certificate – B : It can be taken by SD/SW cadets of the NCC after class year 10, and those studying for a degree. The candidate must have attended a minimum of 75% of the total training periods laid down in the syllabus for the first and second years of SD/SW NCC (All Wings). The cadet must have attended one Annual Training Camp/NIC. Cadets who possess Certificate - A will be awarded 10 bonus marks. An air wing cadet must do a minimum of 10 Glider launches.
- Certificate – C : Is the highest level certificate for NCC cadets. It can be taken in the third year of training, in the third year of the degree course. Those who possess a Certificate - B can take it in the first year after their +2, and in the first year of their degree. The cadet must have attended two Annual Training Camps or one Annual Training Camp and one of the following: RD Camp Delhi, Centrally Organized Camp, Para Training Camp, Attachment Training with service units, National Integration Camp, Youth Exchange Program, or Foreign Cruise (Navy Wing only).

=== Grading in Certificates ===
Three certificates are awarded: 'A' grade, 'B' grade, and 'C' grade.

A cadet has to obtain 45% marks in each paper & 50% marks in the aggregate to pass the examination. Grading is based on the total marks obtained and will be awarded as follows. Grading 'A' – Cadets obtaining 80% marks and above, Grading 'B' – Cadets obtaining 65% marks and above but below 80%, Grading 'C' – Cadets obtaining 50% marks and above but below 65%, Fail – Cadets obtaining less than 45% in any paper or less than 50% in aggregate. The grading has changed now; it's negative marking for all B and C certificate exams, that is, +2 for every right answer, -0.5 for every wrong answer, and no deduction if the question is not marked.

== Activities ==
=== Republic Day Camp (RDC) ===
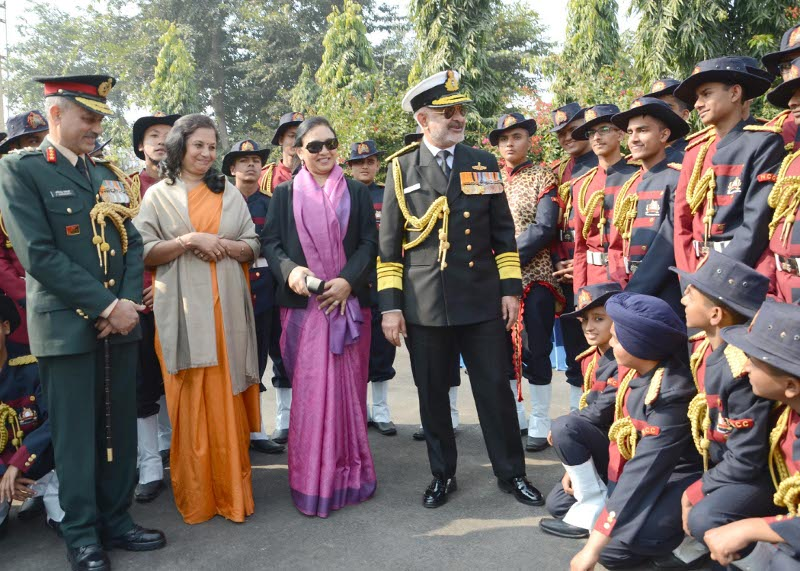
Chief of Naval Staff Admiral Devendra Kumar Joshi interacting with NCC cadets at the Republic Day Camp 2014. DG NCC Lt Gen Aniruddha Chakravarty is also seen.

Before the RDC, all group headquarters participated in the IGC (Inter-Group Competition). After the IGC, the selected cadets are trained by the drill instructors of the Indian Army, and they are given rigorous military training and drill training daily until the time comes when the cadets have to depart for Delhi to represent their respective states.

- NCC Republic Day Camp is the culmination of all NCC Training activities. RDC is held at Cariappa Parade Ground, Delhi Cantt, from 01 to 29 Jan. 2341 Selected NCC Cadets from 17 directorates attend the Camp. The Camp is inaugurated by the Vice President of India and culminates with the Prime Minister's Rally on 28 Jan.
- During the camp visit of Raksha Mantri, Cabinet Ministers, Chief Minister of Delhi, the Chief of Defence Staff, along with various State Ministers/VIPs, shall also be organised.
- During the RDC, various competitions are conducted amongst the 17 NCC Directorates to decide the Champion Directorate for the award of the Prime Minister's Banner. Competitions are keenly contested in various events such as National Integration Awareness presentation, Drill, Line & Flag Area, Cultural Programs, i.e., group song, group dance & ballet, Best Cadet of Senior Division (Boys) and Senior Wing (Girls) in each Service - Army, Navy & Air Force, and Best Cadet Boys and Girls each from Junior Wing. Aero modelling and Ship modelling are also conducted during RDC.
- The selections for cadets who will represent India in the Youth Exchange Program are also conducted.

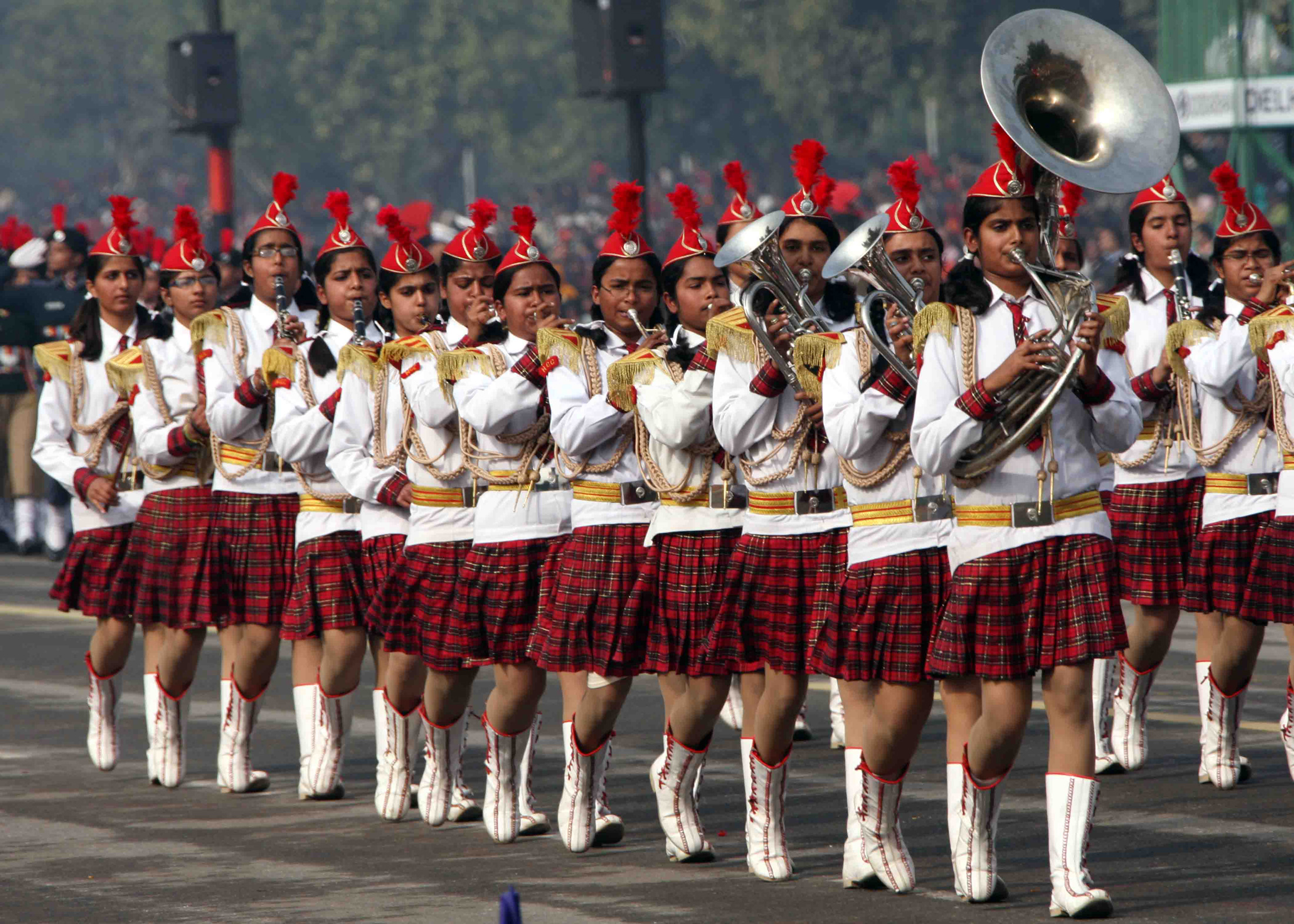
The Girls NCC Band from the Birla Balika Vidyapeeth school participating in a full dress rehearsal for the Republic Day Parade in 2011.

The National Cadet Corps maintains two cadet bands: the Boys Band of the NCC and the Girls Band of the NCC. They are commonly formed up during the NCC Republic Day Camp in late January, during which the bands participate in the Republic Day Parade on 26 January and the Prime Minister's Rally on 28 Biggest camps of N.C.C.

Combined Annual Training Camps (CATC) In the CATCs, the boys (senior and junior divisions) and girl cadets (senior and junior wings) of a particular NCC unit participate in the 10-day camp. Classes are conducted as per the given syllabus, wherein certain aspects of NCC training are taught once again. The camp acts as a refresher training for the cadets, and they are also trained in basic skills of survival and emergencies, besides other topics. They are taught certain skills pertaining specifically to their Wing, e.g., a Naval cadet is trained in boat-rowing, oaring, Semaphore, etc. Another activity in the camp is the "dogwatch," wherein two cadets are to stay on sentry duty for two hours at any time given time of the day. Those caught sleeping, especially during late-night or early morning shifts, or otherwise missing from duty, are severely reprimanded or penalized. Cadets are also introduced to weapons such as a .22 caliber rifle. They are also given tasks of serving food to fellow cadets.

=== Ek Bharat Shreshtha Bharat Camp (EBSB) ===
EBSB is to propagate national integration among cadets and society. Only the best cadets in culture are sent to represent their states.' This camp is considered for SSLC and higher secondary course (+2) grace marks. These camps are conducted on an all-India basis and help bridge the cultural gap among various States of India. In addition, there are six special EBSB camps conducted at Leh, Nagrota (J&K), Chakabama (NER, Nagaland), Srinagar, Lakshadweep and Port Blair.There are now camps being conducted between two directorates only; the best cadet system is now removed, and locations for camp have spanned all across the states. Out of the two directorates conducting the camp, one acts as the host and the other as the guest to interchange culture and traditions to increase friendship and bonding, and comradeship among cadets.

=== Advance Leadership Camp (ALC) ===
Advance Leadership Camp is conducted 6 times in various places throughout India. A cadet must have completed Basic Leadership Camp to qualify for this camp. In this camp, the officers give cadets training for the SSB screening and entrance.

=== Army Attachment Camp ===
These camps are conducted by the NCC in collaboration with the Indian Army, as the willing cadets are attached to a specific army battalion, undergoing the training period of 10–15 days each. In this camp, the cadets are trained by the instructors of the particular regiment in military tactics, including day/night warfare, and also get familiar with the small arms and heavy weapon systems, and are introduced to regimental traditions and customs in infantry regiments and service traditions in other arms and services.

=== Hiking And Trekking Camps ===
Adventurous treks and hikes up mountains take place, with expeditions to local mountains and hills.

=== Thal Sainik Camp (TSC) ===
The TSC is a 12-day camp conducted in Delhi every year in the late autumn, in which the cadets are selected from all 17 directorates (30+3 SD / JD and SW / JW cadets from each directorate) by the selection procedure conducted through 3 pre-TSC camps, each of 10–12 days, with a one-week interval. The selected cadets are then sent to the TSC to represent their respective directorates in the following competitions:

- Obstacle course – In which the obstacles include a 6-foot wall, zig-zag, double ditch, balancing, 3-foot bar, left bar, right bar, incline, etc. It is done after wearing full tactical gear with rifles.
- Firing – It consists of two types – Shooting (Grouping, Snap-shooting & Application). It is done with a standard .22 caliber rifle at the range of 25 meters & 50 meters.
- Map Reading – which includes working with a compass, a service protractor & a map.
- Field craft and battle craft.
- Tent pitching.
- Health and Hygiene.

=== Vayu Sainik Camp (VSC) ===
The All India Vayu Sainik Camp is the most prestigious camp of the NCC air wing. This time, AIVSC was held at the Air Force Station at Bengaluru, Karnataka. . The AIVSC is the training camp of NCC and is designed to expose the cadets to a strenuous military way of life.

On the first day, all the cadets were briefed by the camp commandant regarding the camp. Each day, there was an activity, whether it was a competition or anything else. Apart from these events, one day it was decided to give A visit to Air Force Station, Jodhpur, where cadets see and learn how various fighter planes and helicopters work. Luckily, cadets also got the opportunity to fly in an Indian Air Force Mi-17 helicopter and Pipistrel microlight aircraft and also got the chance to visit glorious places of interest in and around Jodhpur. The camp, in fact, portrays a reflection of 'mini India'. The camp is visited by several dignitaries, including DDG and many other army and air force officials.

=== Nau Sainik Camp (NSC) ===
NSC is one of the golden camps of NCC, it's part of the naval wing and conducted under the Indian Navy. This centrally organised Naval Camp is conducted annually for selected Naval Wing Cadets. Boat pulling, semaphore, whaler rigging, firing, and drill competitions are the main attractions of the camp. The competition is conducted from IGC (intergroup competition), PRE NSC 1, 2, 3, and AINSC. It is generally held at the Naval Maritime Academy (NAMAC) in Mumbai, but has been held at Karwar since 2014. The coming NSC 2023 is going to be held at INS Shivaji, Lonavala, Mumbai, from 13 October.

=== All India Yachting Regatta (AIYR) ===
This centrally organised Naval Camp is conducted annually for selected Naval Wing Cadets. Yachting (Sailing) is the main attraction of the camp. It is generally held at Naval Base INS Chilika in Odisha.

=== Rock Climbing Training Camps (RCTC) ===
Eight rock climbing camps are held each year to expose the cadets to the basics of elementary rock climbing and to inculcate a spirit of adventure amongst cadets. Four of these camps are held at Gwalior in Madhya Pradesh, and the other four camps at Nayyardam near Trivandrum in Kerala.

=== Naval Wing Activities ===
The Naval wing syllabus is common for both boys and girls. During sea training, naval subjects like Seamanship, Navigation, Communication, Gunnery, Damage Control, and Ship Safety are taught to cadets. Swimming, Scuba Diving, and windsurfing are the other interesting activities.

=== Air Wing Activities ===
Gliding, Microlite Flying (generally the Zenith STOL CH 701), and attachment training with air force stations and establishments are the main activities. 100 Pipistrel Virus SW 80 on order.

=== Youth Exchange Programme (YEP) ===
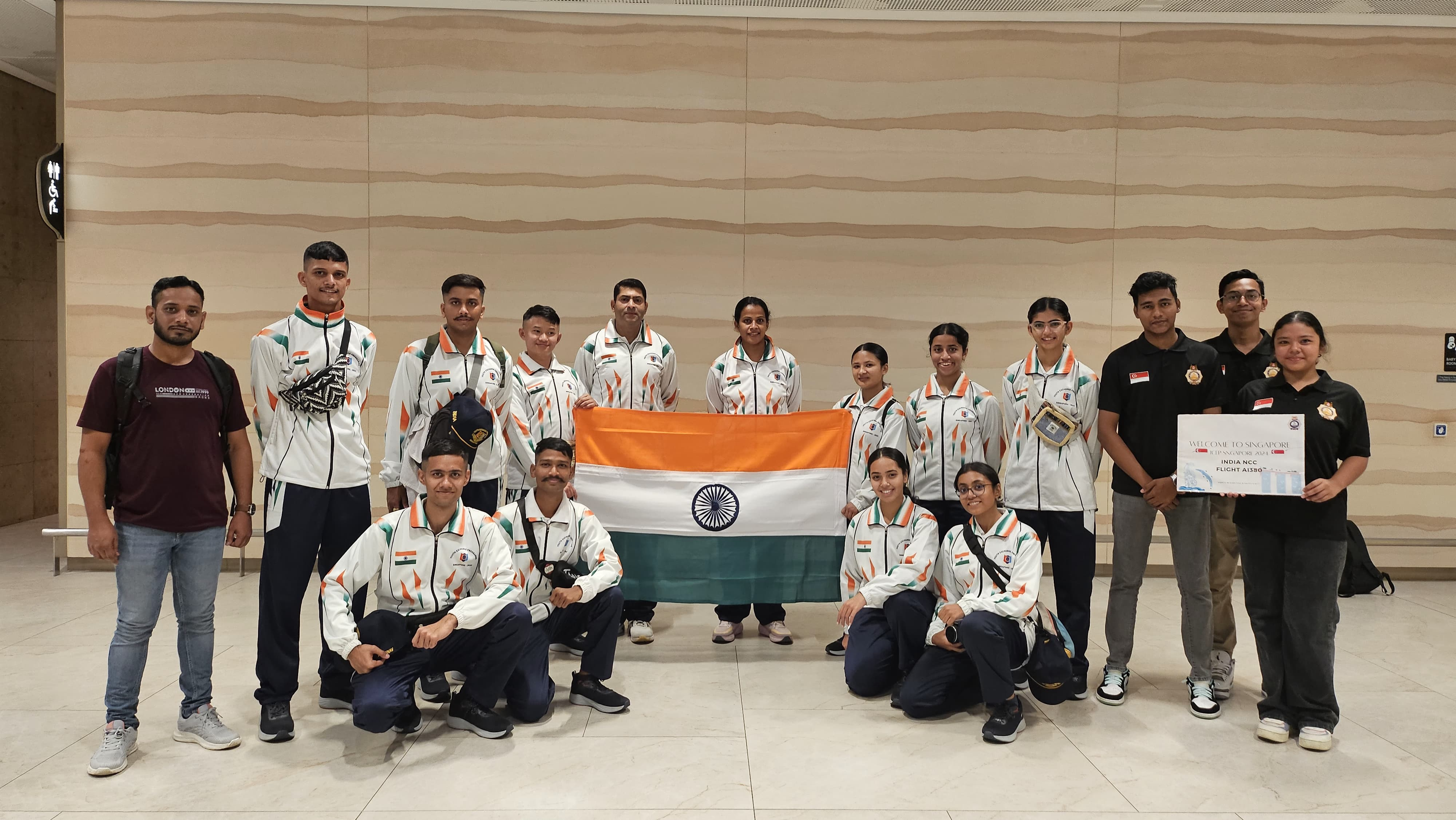
Cadets of NCC India being welcomed by their liaison cadets from NCC Singapore for ICEP Singapore on 10 November 2024

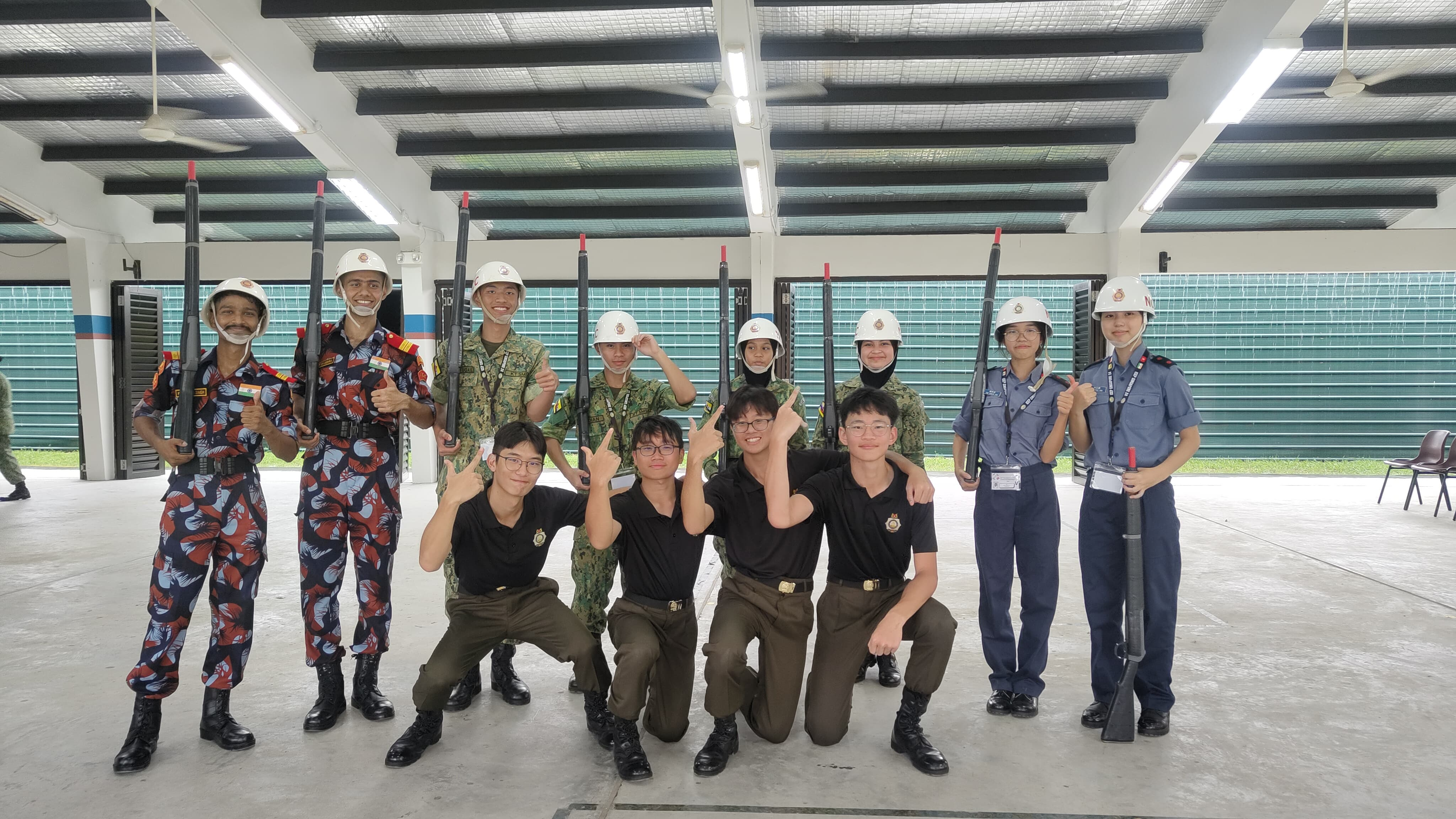
Cadets from Brunei, Hong Kong and India training in PDS of NCC Singapore during ICEP 2024.

The aim of YEP is a country-to-country exchange of cadets belonging to NCC or other equivalent government or youth organizations of friendly countries, and participation in various activities and appreciation of each other's socio-economic and cultural realities. Cadets who were in Rdc camp can go to YEP, The best cadet in the RDC SD/SW get a chance if he/she is in 2nd year .More than 100 cadets proceed abroad on YEP annually. It is the most prestigious camp in NCC. The cadets currently visit countries such as Singapore, the United Kingdom, Mauritius, Vietnam, the Maldives, Nepal, Bhutan, Bangladesh, Sri Lanka, and Russia. The cadets for YEP are selected annually during the RDC held in Delhi, going through various tests and selection criteria. Only senior cadets and go, Cadets from foreign nations also visit India in YEP every year during the RDC and Desert Safari held in Rajasthan DTE. Around 25 countries participate in the PM Rally during the RDC.

=== Overseas Deployment ===
A select few cadets from the Senior Division (Navy) are attached to the 1st Training Squadron of the Indian Navy for a period of 30–45 days, wherein they are trained in Naval Subjects and Practical Seamanship as well as travel to friendly foreign nations on Goodwill Missions. A total of 10-20 cadets are selected to represent the National Cadet Corps for this camp.

== List of Director-generals of the NCC ==
The Director-Generals of the NCC held the rank of major-general from 1951 until 1983, when the appointment was upgraded to the rank of Lieutenant General.

Rank	Name	Appointment Date	Left Office
Director-General National Cadet Corps
Colonel	Gopal Gurunath Bewoor	31 March 1948	1 August 1950
Major General	Virendra Singh (first tenure)	20 September 1951	13 November 1955
Major General	Dewan Prem Chand (first tenure)	14 November 1955	6 September 1957
Major General	Amrik Singh MC	7 September 1957	4 February 1959
Major General	Rajender Singh Paintal	15 February 1959	6 October 1961
Major General	Anant Singh Pathania MVC, MC	7 October 1961	23 October 1962
Major General	Virendra Singh (second tenure)	4 November 1962	31 July 1966
Major General	Dewan Prem Chand PVSM (second tenure)	1 August 1966	4 August 1967
Major General	D. S. Kalha PVSM	15 August 1967	19 May 1970
Major General	M. G. Hazari AVSM	30 June 1970	28 March 1973
Major General	B. M. Bhattacharjea MVC, AVSM	23 April 1973	31 December 1975
Major General	H. K. Bakshi	14 January 1976	26 April 1978
Major General	M. Thomas PVSM, AVSM, VSM	1 May 1978	21 December 1980
Major General	Narindar Singh PVSM	22 December 1980	31 May 1983
Lieutenant-General	S. L. Malhotra PVSM, AVSM	1 June 1983	31 October 1986
Lieutenant-General	M. Mayadas PVSM	1 November 1986	31 July 1988
Lieutenant-General	A. Banerjee PVSM	1 August 1988	31 August 1990
Lieutenant-General	M. K. Lahiri PVSM	17 September 1990	30 September 1992
Lieutenant-General	G. L. Bakshi PVSM	1 October 1992	31 July 1994
Lieutenant-General	R. Mohan PVSM, AVSM, VSM	1 August 1994	30 September 1996
Lieutenant-General	B. S. Malik AVSM	28 February 1997	24 April 1999
Lieutenant-General	A. S. Rao PVSM, AVSM	25 April 1999	31 October 2001
Lieutenant-General	B. K. Bopanna AVSM, VSM	1 November 2001	31 July 2004
Lieutenant-General	M. C. Bhandari AVSM & Bar	1 August 2004	27 September 2006
Lieutenant-General	P. S. Chaudhary PVSM, AVSM, SM, VSM	28 September 2006	30 November 2008
Lieutenant-General	Raj Kumar Karwal AVSM, SM & Bar	1 December 2008	31 January 2011
Lieutenant-General	P. S. Bhalla PVSM, AVSM	21 February 2011	30 November 2013
Lieutenant-General	Aniruddha Chakravarty AVSM, VSM	1 December 2013	31 August 2016
Lieutenant-General	Vinod Vashisht AVSM, VSM & Bar	23 December 2016	October 2017
Lieutenant-General	B. S. Sahrawat AVSM, SM	22 December 2017	10 April 2018
Lieutenant-General	P. P. Malhotra VSM	11 April 2018	30 January 2019
Lieutenant-General	Rajeev Chopra PVSM, AVSM	31 January 2019	31 December 2020
Lieutenant-General	Tarun Kumar Aich PVSM, AVSM	1 January 2021	26 September 2021
Lieutenant-General	Gurbirpal Singh PVSM, AVSM, VSM	27 September 2021	13 August 2025
Lieutenant-General	Virendra Vats YSM, SM, VSM	14 August 2025	Incumbent

== See also ==
- National Service Scheme (NSS)
- Rashtriya Indian Military College (RIMC)
- Rashtriya Military Schools (RMS)
- Sainik Schools
- Cadets (youth program)
