= Army Day (India) =

National Indian Army Day

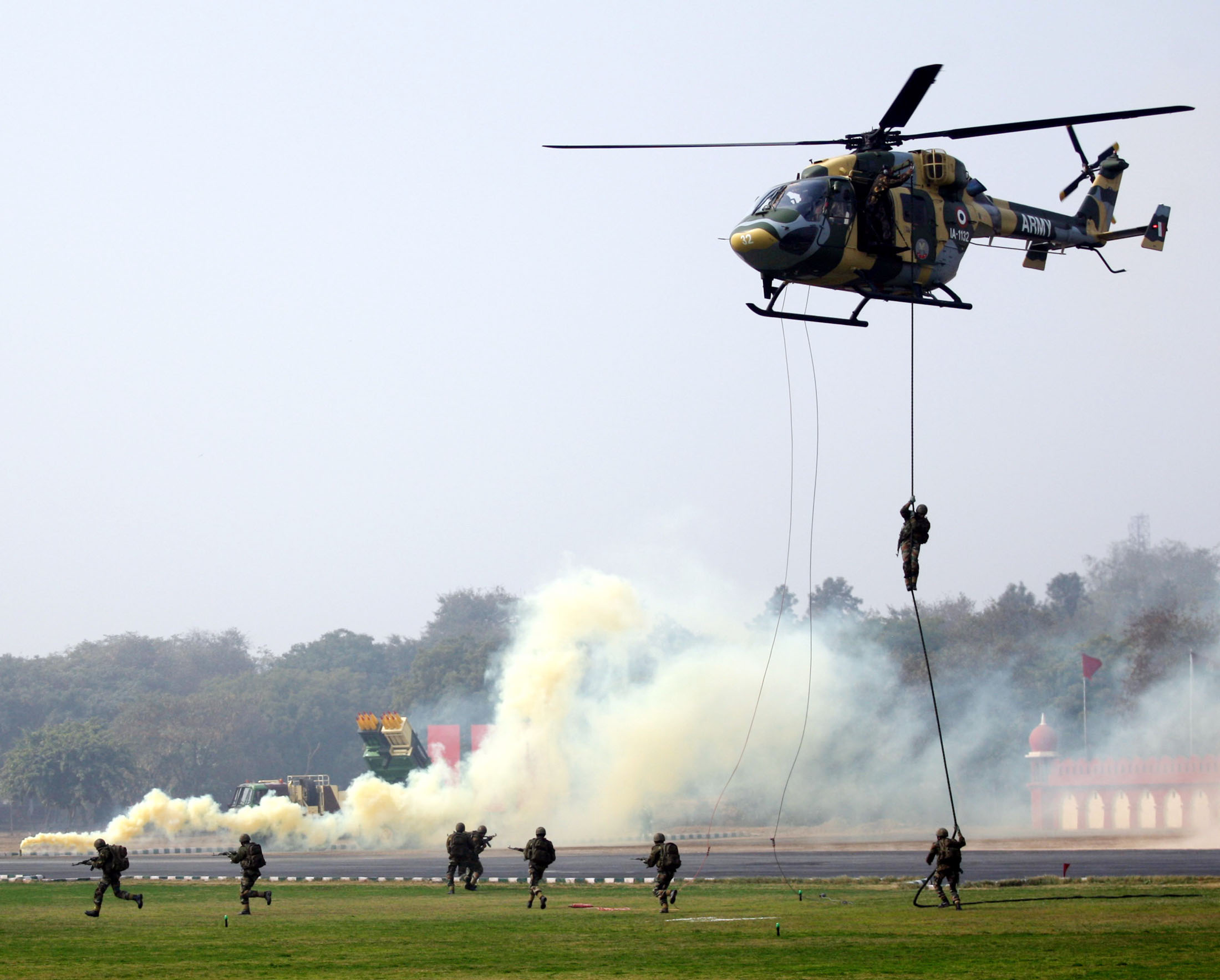
- Army soldiers conduct a drill at the Army Day parade in New Delhi on 15 January 2013
- Genre: Military
- Date: 15 January
- Frequency: Annually
- Venue: Amar Jawan Jyoti at India Gate and at all Army Offices and HQs
- Country: India

Army Day is celebrated on 15 January every year in India, in recognition of Lieutenant General Kodandera M. Cariappa's (later who became Field Marshal ) taking over as the first Commander-in-Chief of the Indian Army from General Francis Roy Bucher, the last British Commander-in-Chief of India, on 15 January 1949. The day is celebrated in the form of parades and other military shows in the national capital New Delhi as well as in all headquarters. On 15 January 2023, India celebrated its 75th Indian Army Day in Bengaluru. Army Day marks a day to salute the valiant soldiers who sacrificed their lives to protect the country and its citizens.

While celebrations take place across the country, the main Army Day parade was for many years conducted in the Cariappa Parade ground in Delhi cantonment before the decision was made to move the main event to various Army installations and other key cities in India. In 2026, the Indian Army made the bold decision to move the parade to Jaipur and into the main roads, officially opening the parade to the general public for the first time in years. Gallantry awards and Sena medals are also awarded on this day. In 2020, 15 Army personnel were presented with bravery awards as part of the Army Day honours list. Param Vir Chakra and Ashok Chakra awardees participate in the Army Day parade every year. Military hardware, numerous contingents and a combat display are part of the parade. In 2020, Captain Tania Shergill became the first female officer to command an Army Day parade.

== See also ==
- Armed Forces Day in other countries

== Bibliography ==
Verma, Bharat; Hiranandani, GM; Pandey, BK (2013). Indian Armed Forces. Atlanta: Lancer Publishers LLC. p. 31. ISBN 9781935501732.
