= Vinod Vashisht =

Vinod Vashisht is a former general of the Indian Army. He was appointed director general of the National Cadet Corps (India) (NCC) on December 23l 2016, succeeding Lt Gen Aniruddha Chakravarty, who retired on August 31 of that year. He remained director general of the NCC until 2017.

He was commissioned into the Regiment of Artillery in June 1979, after graduating from the Defence Services Staff College, Higher Command Course and National Defence College. He held appointments such as colonel general staff of an armoured division and secretary of the Chief of Staff Committee. He commanded a regiment and brigade in Jammu and Kashmir and an artillery division as part of a strike corps in the Southern Theater. He was assigned as additional military secretary (A) with mandate of career management and posting of all officers of the Army up to the rank of colonel. He was also the commandant, Officers Training Academy, Gaya.
