= Corps of Signals (India) =

Communications arm of the Indian Army

- Crest of the Corps of Signals
- Active: 15 February 1911 – Present
- Country: United Kingdom; India
- Allegiance: British India (1911–1947); India (1947 – present)
- Branch: British Indian Army; Indian Army
- Role: Communication Support
- Regimental Centre: Jabalpur, India
- Mottos: "Teevra Chaukas"; Swift and Secure
- Anniversaries: 15 February (Raising Day)
- Engagements: First World War; Second World War: Burma Campaign; Sino-Indian War of 1962 Indo-Pakistani War of 1947; Indo-Pakistani War of 1965; Indo-Pakistani War of 1971; Indo-Pakistani War of 1999
- Decorations: 2 Maha Vir Chakra; 4 Vir Chakra; 1 Yudh Seva Medal, 29 Vishisht Seva Medal; 56 Sena Medal; 4 Kirti Chakra; 9 Shaurya Chakra

Commanders
- Signal Officer in Chief: Lieutenant General Vivek Dogra, SM
- Colonel Commandants: Lt Gen Vivek Dogra, SM SOinC & Senior Colonel Commandant; Lt Gen H S Vandra, SM

Insignia
- Regimental Colors: Navy Blue; Sky Blue; Green
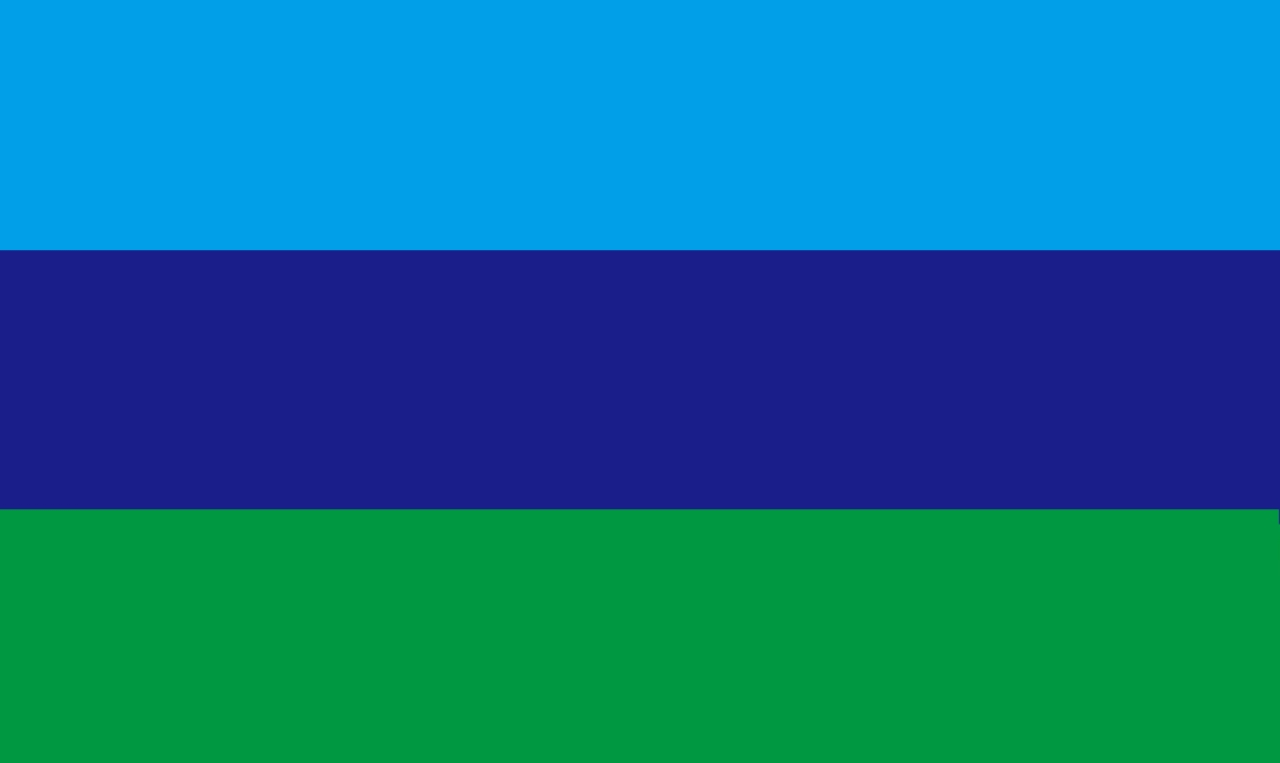
- Regimental Flag

The Corps of Signals is a corps and a combat support arm of the Indian Army, which handles its military communications. It was formed on 15 February 1911 as a separate entity under Lieutenant Colonel S H Powell and went on to make important contributions to World War I and World War II. The corps celebrated its 100th anniversary of raising on 15 February 2010.

== History ==
It was formed on 15 February 1911 at Fatehgarh under Lieutenant Colonel S. H. Powell. It originated from earlier telegraph units established in 1868 by Sappers and Miners, evolving into a separate corps during British colonial rule and achieving full Indianization by 1947 before being redesignated on 26 January 1950. During World War I, the Corps underwent significant expansion to meet the demands of global conflict, growing from its nascent companies into a vital support element for Indian Expeditionary Forces and units were deployed to multiple theaters where they established and maintained communication lines under challenging conditions.

The Corps has participated in all wars as part of the Indian Army, including World War I, World War II, Operation in 1947, 1965 Operation Gibraltar in 1965, Operation Trident in 1971, Operation Pawan, and Operation VIJAY. After the Sino-Indian conflict of 1962, there was sudden expansion and two additional Centres were raised, one in Goa and the second at Jabalpur. In 1967, Signal Training Centre, located at Jabalpur, was disbanded. Each of the Training Centres now consists of one Military Training Regiment and three Technical Training Regiments.

The Corps has the honour of being presented the Regimental Colours by the then Hon'ble President, Dr Sarvapalli Radhakrishnan on 20 February 1965 at No. 1 Signal Training Centre, Jabalpur. Some of its noteworthy communication projects like Army Static Switched Communication Network (ASCON) was dedicated to the Nation by the then Hon'ble PM Shri P. V. Narsimha Rao in August 1995 while in February 2006 the Army Wide Area Network (AWAN) was similarly dedicated to the Nation by the then Hon'ble President of India Dr APJ Abdul Kalam.

The motto of the Corps of Signals is "Teevra Chaukas", meaning "Swift and Secure", reflecting their commitment to providing reliable and rapid communication services. This commitment towards speed and reliability is mirrored in their emblem, which features the Mercury, symbolizing speed, communication and agility.

=== The Corps Emblem ===
Mercurius which is a roman version of Greek God "Hermes", the messenger of Gods in Greek mythology, a Magic Wand (Caduceus), Winged Sandals (Talaria), Winged Cap "Petasus" and Wings on Top of "Caduceus" Further enhance the motion of the sandals. The figure of Mercury on a Globe supported by a School, which bears our motto "Teevra Chaukas" and Twelve Laurel Leaves below. The whole Emblem with Mercury facing his right is surmounted by a detached Five Pointed Star.

== Role ==
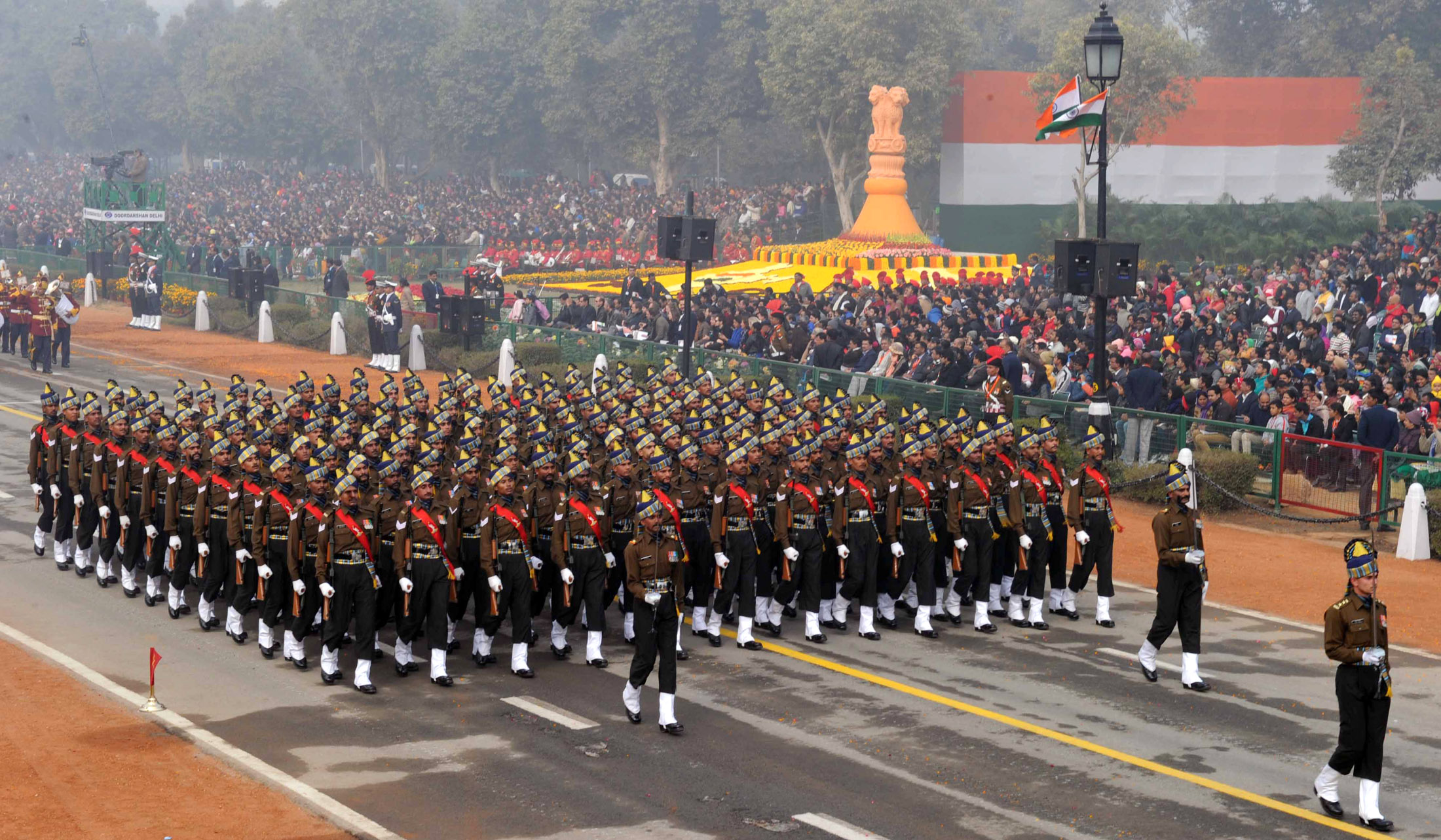
The Corps of Signals marching contingents passes through the Rajpath, on the occasion of the 67th Republic Day Parade 2016

The Corps of Signals is a combat support arm of the Indian Army responsible for military communications since its inception on 15 Feb 1911, the Corps has evolved significantly, adapting to the changing technological landscape to ensure seamless and secure communications within the armed forces. The primary role of the Corps of Signals is to develop, manage and operate the communication networks of the Indian Army. It has evolved over the years from rudimentary semaphores, signal flags, radio and telegraph systems to advanced satellite communications, cyber operations and electronic warfare. The Corps evolution has enabled the Indian Army to maintain secure and efficient communications across diverse terrains and operational areas.

The Corps ensures that commanders at all levels can communicate effectively, which is crucial for operational success. It has been at the forefront of integrating cutting-edge technologies with military strategy ensuring the Indian Army's agility and responsiveness in all combat and non-combat scenarios. The troops of the Corps of Signals are trained in all aspects of soldiering and also in Information Technology, Electronics and Communication Engineering in premier Institutions like the Military College of Telecommunication Engineering (MCTE) and Signal Training Centres (STCs). This specialized training equips them to handle complex operational duties and communication systems.

The Corps of Signals also contributes to various non combat operations like setting up communication networks to provide communication during natural disasters facilitating coordination amongst relief agencies. Their expertise is also critical during United Nations Peacekeeping Missions where robust communications networks and implementation of cyber defense measures are essential.

== Adventure activities ==
The Corps is renowned for its esprit-de-corps and military discipline. It has been an integral part of Indian Army at important National and International fora. In the sports field too, the Corps has an excellent record. It has produced veterans like M. P. Ganesh, Leslie Fernandez, SR Pawar, Gulzar Singh, S Jayaram, Achinta Sheuli, and Narender to name a few. MP Ganesh took part in the World Cup Hockey in Barcelona and the Munich Olympics. It was a red-lettered day in the history of the Corps when MP Ganesh captained the National side for the World Cup in Amsterdam. He was honoured with Arjuna Award in 1973 and the Padma Shri in 2020. Boxer S Jayaram was awarded the Arjuna Award for Boxing in 1989. The Corps continues to encourage individuals to participate in sports and is second to none in its pursuit of excellence.

The Dispatch Rider team of the Corps, popularly known as "The Dare Devils", is renowned for brilliant displays which have thrilled spectators on various important occasions including Republic Day Parades. The Dare Devils team has numerous Guinness World Records and Limca Book of records to its credit. The marching contingent led by Captain Tania Shergill was adjudged the best marching contingent during Republic Day Parade 2020.

As the Indian army forges ahead towards technological absorption, the Corps of Signals will be at the forefront of this effort with its technical prowess and continues to stand as a testament to the indispensable role of Information and Communication technologies in modern military operations.

== Training and technology ==
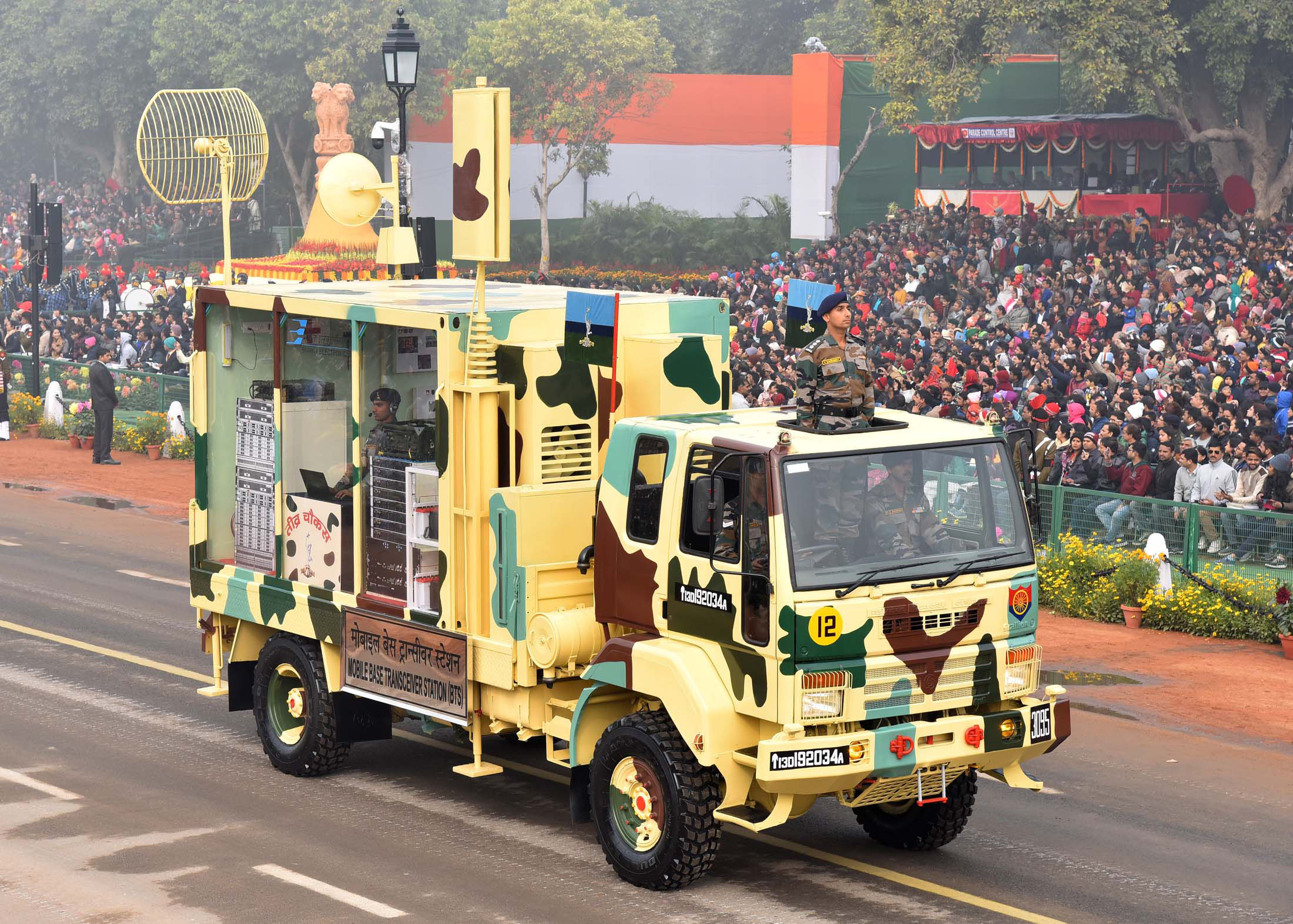
Mobile Base Transceiver Station of the Corps of Signals

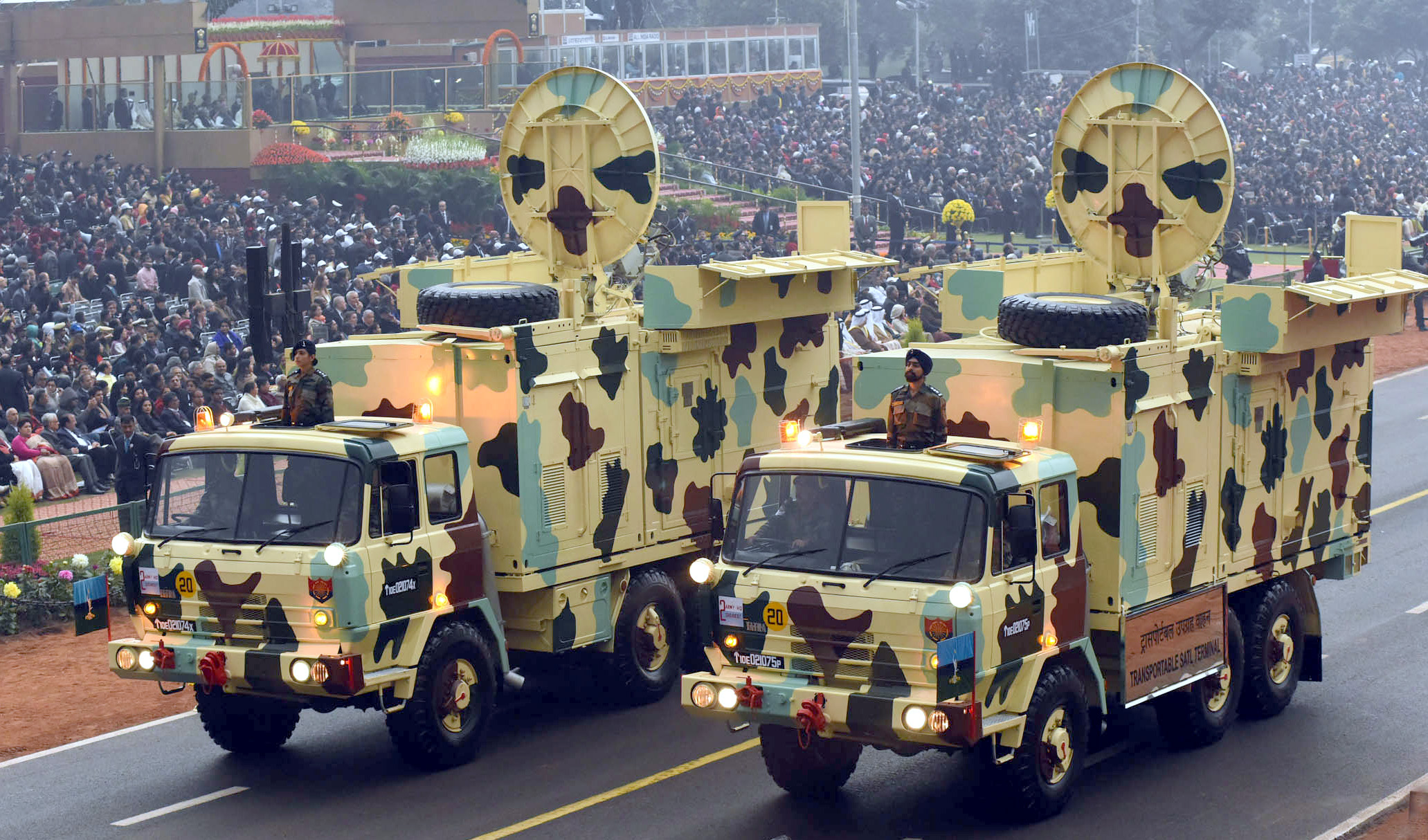
Transportable Satellite Terminal of the Corps of Signals

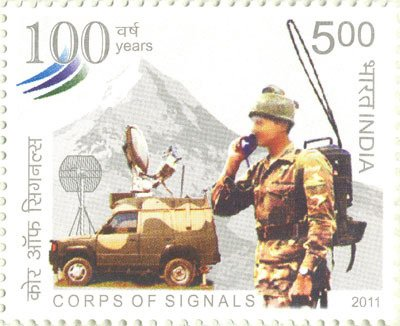
Corps of Signals Centenary postage stamp issued in 2011

The Corps works closely with the Defence Research and Development Organisation (DRDO) to develop command and control software, notably the Samyukta Electronic Warfare System, a mobile integrated electronic warfare system, developed along with Bharat Electronics Limited.

The Military College of Telecommunication Engineering (MCTE), Mhow is a premier training institute of the Corps of Signals. Its war museum is situated at Jabalpur, where 1 Signals Training Centre is based.

== Decorations ==
Gallantry awards

- Maha Vir Chakra
  - Brig KS Gourishankar (1971)
  - Brig HS Kler (1965)
- Vir Chakra
  - Brig HS Bains (1948)
  - Hav KG Geore (1965)
  - Capt (Later Brig) PK Ghosh (1971)
  - Sigmn (Later LT Col) DC Dillon (1971)
- Kirti Chakra
  - Sigmn DR Deshmukh (1976)
  - Tukaram Omble (2008)
  - Capt Deepak Sharma (2010)
  - Capt Devinder S Jass (2010)
- Ashok Chakra
  - MAJ JK Grover (1957)
- Shaurya Chakra
  - Lnk Jagbeer Singh (1977)
  - CHM Timaiah PK Jaiapa (1979)
  - Sigmn Mahendra K Sharma (1985)
  - LHav Birbal (1998)
  - Capt Sunil Yadav (2007)
  - Lnk Gopal S Bhadoriya (2017)
  - Capt Abhinav k Chaudhary (2019)
  - Capt MV Prajwal (2023)
  - Capt Deepak Sharma (2024)
- Sena Medel
  - Capt Davin Singh Malik (2021)
  - Maj Sudhir Kumar (2021)
  - Sigmn Kushwaha Pradeep
  - Capt Udit Mohan Raj
  - Capt Krishnakumar K
  - Maj Shailendra K Yadav
  - Capt Sushant Sharma
  - Capt Atul Dhankar
  - Maj Yogesh Sharma
  - Capt K Chamoli
  - Maj S Gaur
  - Maj Pankaj Kumar
  - Capt S Paul
  - Maj Manish K
  - Maj Satish Gupta
  - Maj Narender K
  - Hav Bipul Roy(P)
  - Maj Vijay K
  - Capt Reshab Dhungana
  - Capt Abid Sohil
  - Maj Gen HS Vandra
  - Lnk Harish Chandra Nain
  - Maj Aditya S
  - Nb Sub NN Chaudhary
  - Sigmn Sahab Singh
  - Sub Bangane RS
  - Maj AK Thenge
  - Lnk Atanu Maity
  - Lnk Jitendra S
  - Lnk Bhopal Singh
  - Sigmn SA Malhari
  - Sigmn MR Chaudhary
  - Capt Shubham Gupta
  - Lnk Gopal S Bhadoriya
  - Sub Mohan Singh
  - Sigmn Vinod Kumar
  - Sigmn KE Chaitram
  - Lnk KS Rao
  - Lnk Deepa Ram
  - Maj Ram Singh
  - Sigmn Ajay Chaudhary
  - 2Lt JK Grover
  - Hav Bagicha Singh
  - Hav Lekh Raj
  - Capt KS Mann
  - Colonel Apinder Pal Singh (2016)
