= Army Law College =

Law college in Pune, Maharashtra, India

Army Law College, Pune
- Motto: On March to Glory
- Type: Law College
- Established: 2018
- Affiliations: University of Pune; BCI
- Principal: Dr. Madhushree Joshi
- Location: Pune, Maharashtra, India; 18°45′12″N 73°35′11″E
- Campus: Suburban
- Website: www.alcpune.com

Army Law College (ALC), Pune is a residential law college located at Kanhe, near Pune, Maharashtra, India. It was established in 2018 under the aegis of the Army Welfare Education Society (AWES). It is affiliated with the Savitribai Phule Pune University and approved by the Bar Council of India. The college offers a five-year integrated BA.LLB and BBA.LLB programme with an intake of 60 students through the Maharashtra Common Entrance Test (MAH-CET Law).

== History ==
The Army Law College was inaugurated on 16 July 2018 by Lieutenant General D. R. Soni, then General Officer Commanding-in-Chief, Southern Command. It was established on land and buildings donated by the Radha Kaliandas Daryanani Charitable Trust at Kanhe, about 45 km from Pune.

== Campus ==
The Kanhe campus is fully residential and has been developed in phases. In August 2021, a five-storey girls’ hostel with capacity for 165 students was inaugurated by Anita Nain, President of the Army Wives Welfare Association (AWWA). In December 2022, the Chanakya Academic Block and the Sai Auditorium with 450-seat capacity were inaugurated by Lt Gen A. K. Singh, Southern Army Commander.

== Academics ==
The college offers a five-year integrated BBA LL.B course under SPPU, with admissions through MAH-CET Law. Facilities include classrooms, library resources, and moot court activities.

== Administration ==
The Army Law College functions under the Army Welfare Education Society with oversight from the Southern Command. Dr. Madhushree Joshi, a gold medallist from SPPU, was appointed as the first Principal in 2018. The Registrar’s post has been held by retired Army officers, including Colonel A. K. Pandey (2018) and Colonel Suneel Mann (2025).

== Student protests (2025) ==
In August 2025, more than 300 students staged protests against the principal and registrar, alleging academic mismanagement, dissolution of the student council, and discrimination based on parents’ military ranks. The administration described the agitation as being driven by a few individuals and stated that the college maintained discipline and academic focus.

== See also ==
- Army Institute of Law
- Army Institute of Technology, Pune
- Army Welfare Education Society
