= Army Welfare Education Society =

Educational society serving Indian Army families

- Emblem of the society

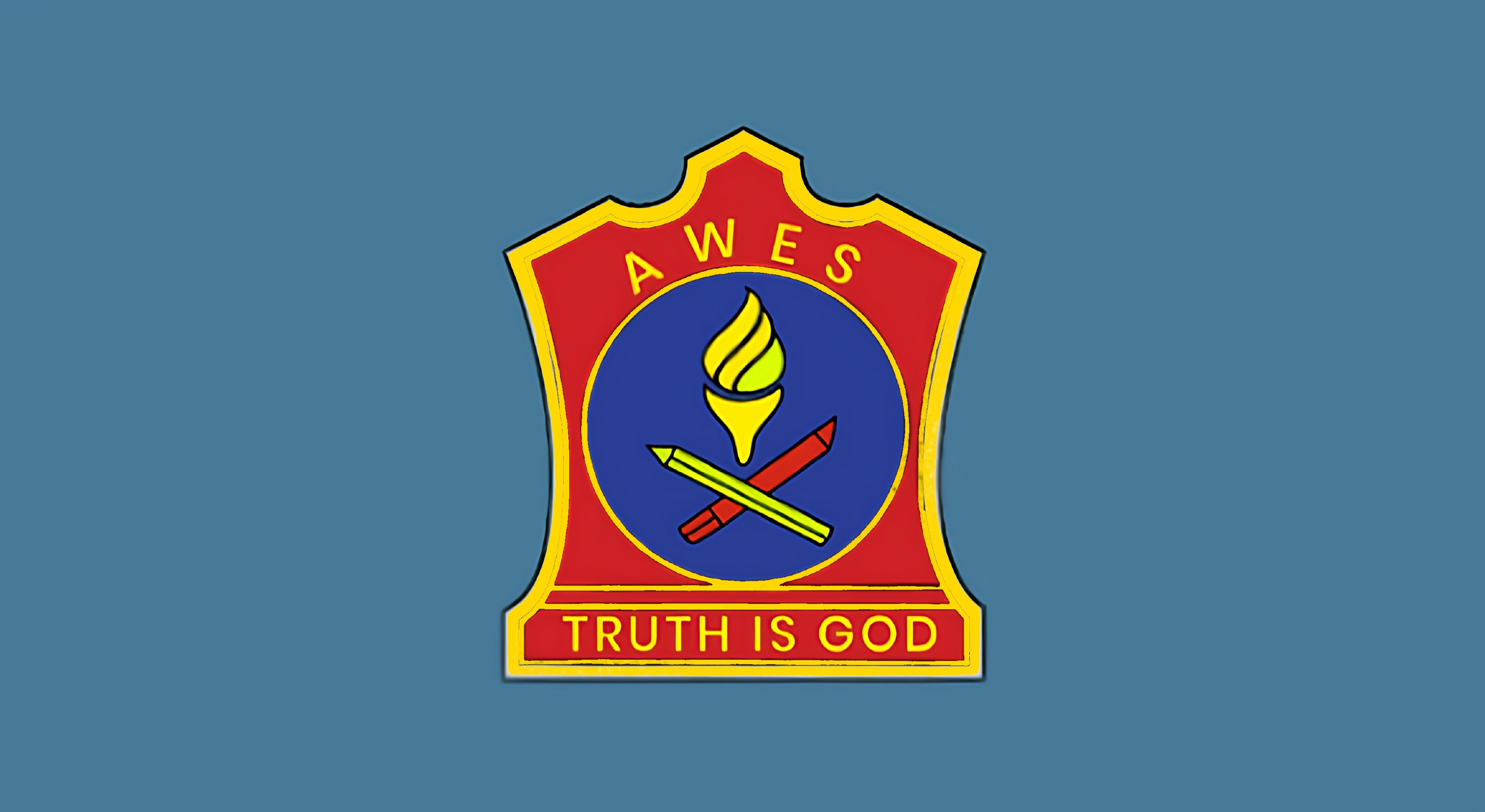
- Flag of the Army Welfare Education Society
- Abbreviation: AWES
- Formation: 29 April 1983; 43 years ago
- Type: Non-profit registered society
- Purpose: Education and professional training for children of Indian Army personnel, veterans and widows
- Headquarters: Shankar Vihar, Delhi Cantonment
- Location: New Delhi, India
- Region served: India
- Services: Army Public Schools; Army Pre Primary Schools; Professional colleges; Teacher training and development
- Official language: English
- Patron-in-Chief: Chief of the Army Staff
- President, Board of Governors: Adjutant General
- Website: www.awesindia.com

The Army Welfare Education Society (AWES) is an Indian non-profit educational society that operates a nationwide network of schools and professional institutions primarily for the children of serving and retired Indian Army personnel. It was registered on 29 April 1983 under the Societies Registration Act, 1860, succeeding the earlier Army Welfare Education Organisation (AWEO).

AWES oversees more than 130 Army Public Schools, approximately 250 Army Pre Primary Schools and 12 professional colleges and institutes in fields including engineering, medicine, dentistry, nursing, law, management, education, hospitality and design.

Its headquarters and Faculty Development and Research Centre are located at Shankar Vihar in Delhi Cantonment, New Delhi.

== History ==
The present AWES system traces its origins to the Army Welfare Education Organisation (AWEO), established on 15 January 1980 under the Adjutant General's Branch of Army Headquarters.

AWEO was created to coordinate educational facilities for children of Army personnel, whose families frequently moved between military stations as a result of service postings. At its formation, 28 regimental schools and four high schools managed by the Army were brought within the organisation.

On 29 April 1983, AWEO was registered under the Societies Registration Act XXI of 1860 as the Army Welfare Education Society. Registration as a society provided the organisational framework required for operating and expanding educational institutions across India.

During the following decade, AWES concentrated principally on school education through the growing Army School system.

In 1994, the society entered professional higher education when the then Chief of the Army Staff initiated plans for the establishment of the Army Institute of Technology at Pune.

The higher-education network subsequently expanded into medicine, dentistry, nursing, law, management, teacher education, fashion and design, and hotel management. AWES now has 12 professional colleges and institutes.

== Army Public Schools ==
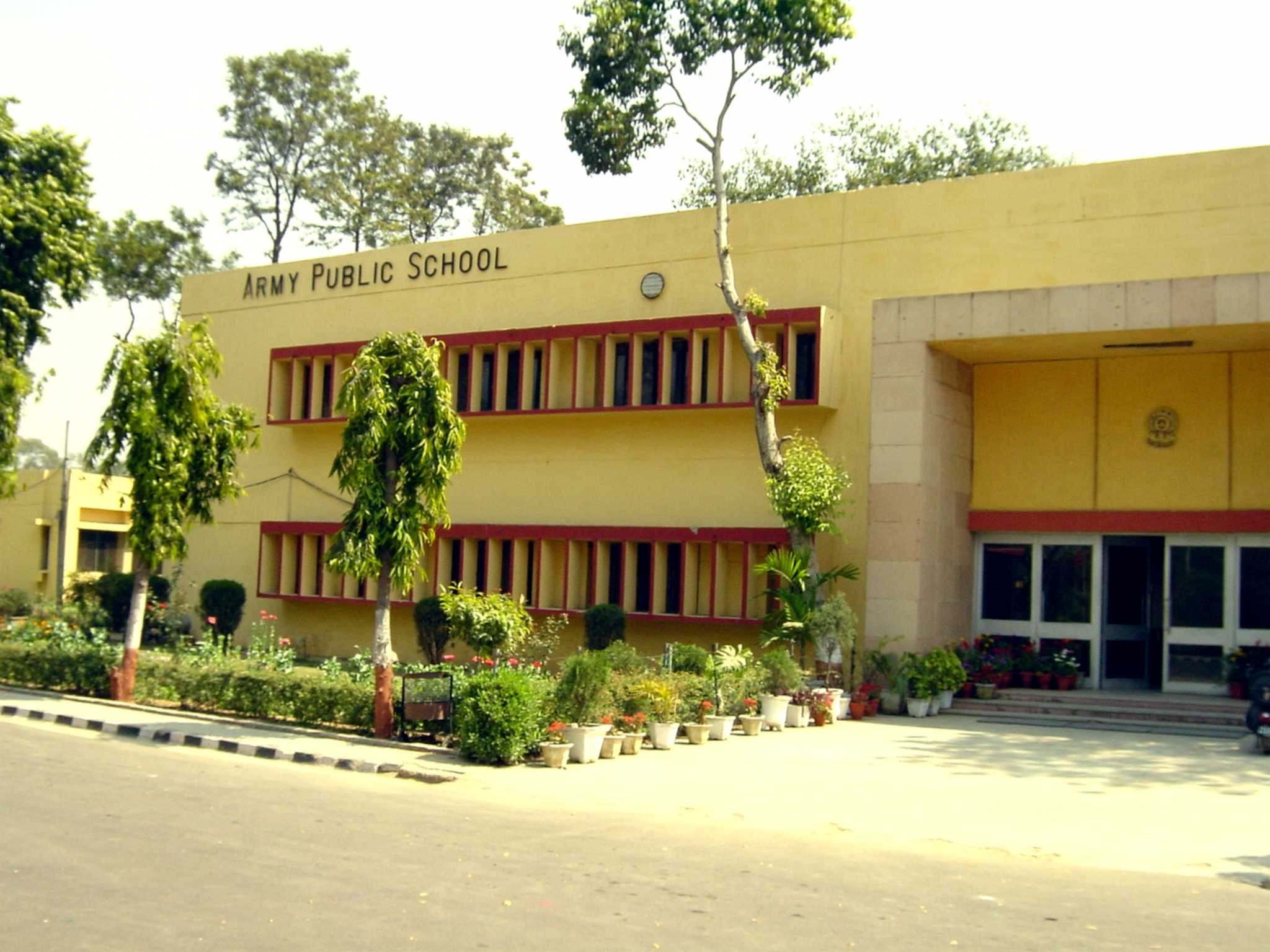
Army Public School, Dhaula Kuan in New Delhi, one of the older institutions in the AWES school network.

The Army Public Schools (APS) form the largest component of AWES.

They operate at military stations and cantonments across India and are intended primarily to provide continuity of education to children of Army personnel whose families may be transferred between postings.

The schools generally follow the NCERT curriculum and are affiliated with the Central Board of Secondary Education (CBSE).

A common academic structure across the network is intended to allow children of Army personnel to transfer between schools, including during an academic session, with less disruption.

The institutions were historically known as Army Schools. The network subsequently adopted the name Army Public Schools in 2011.

AWES has more than 130 Army Public Schools across the country.

Among them are:

- Army Public School, Dhaula Kuan, New Delhi
- Army Public School, Shankar Vihar, New Delhi
- Army Public School, Delhi Cantt
- Army Public School, Pune
- Army Public School, Chennai
- Army Public School, Lansdowne
- Army Public School, Binnaguri
- Army Public School, Gorakhpur
- Army Public School, Bengaluru
- Army Public School, Chandimandir
- Army Public School, Lucknow
- Army Public School, Kolkata
- Army Public School, Mumbai
- Army Public School, Udhampur

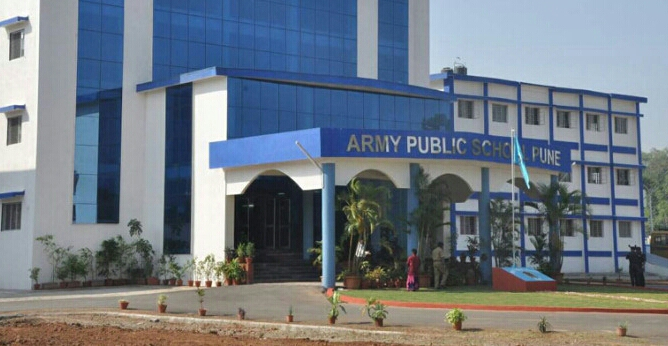
Army Public School at Ghorpadi in Pune Cantonment.

Individual Army Public Schools are administered locally through School Administration and Management Committees while broad policy, academic coordination and administrative guidelines are provided by AWES.

== Army Pre Primary Schools ==
AWES also supports the network of Army Pre Primary Schools (APPS) operating at military stations.

The pre-primary institutions developed separately at local military stations before being brought under a more coordinated early-childhood education framework.

In 2005, the Army Pre-school Education Council was established in association with the Army Wives Welfare Association to develop common early-childhood-care and education guidelines. The institutions subsequently adopted the Army Pre Primary School nomenclature.

AWES provides support in areas including:

- curriculum development;
- books and learning material;
- teacher training; and
- transition of children into primary education.

Approximately 250 Army Pre Primary Schools operate across India.

== Professional education ==
AWES operates 12 professional colleges and institutes across India.

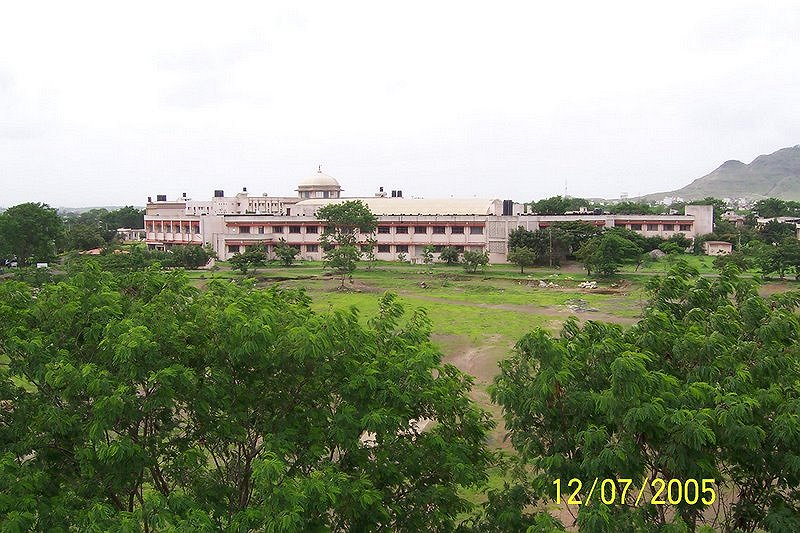
Army Institute of Technology in Pune, the first major professional-education initiative undertaken by AWES.

The professional-education system developed from a 1994 initiative to establish institutions of higher education specifically for the wards of Army personnel.

The institutions cover engineering, medicine, dentistry, nursing, management, law, education, hospitality and design.

Institution	Location	Principal field
Army Institute of Technology	Pune, Maharashtra	Engineering
Army Institute of Hotel Management and Catering Technology	Bengaluru, Karnataka	Hospitality management
Army Institute of Management, Kolkata	Kolkata, West Bengal	Management
Army Institute of Management and Technology, Greater Noida	Greater Noida, Uttar Pradesh	Management
Army College of Dental Sciences	Secunderabad, Telangana	Dentistry
Army College of Nursing	Jalandhar Cantonment, Punjab	Nursing
Army Law College	Kanhe, Pune district, Maharashtra	Law
Army Institute of Education	Greater Noida, Uttar Pradesh	Teacher education
Army Institute of Law	Mohali, Punjab	Law
Army Institute of Fashion and Design	Bengaluru, Karnataka	Fashion and design
Army Institute of Nursing	Guwahati, Assam	Nursing
Army College of Medical Sciences	Delhi Cantonment, New Delhi	Medicine

=== Army Institute of Technology ===
The Army Institute of Technology (AIT) at Pune was conceived in 1994 as one of AWES's first ventures into professional higher education.

The institute provides undergraduate engineering programmes and primarily caters to children of Army personnel.

=== Army College of Medical Sciences ===
The Army College of Medical Sciences (ACMS) is located in Delhi Cantonment.

Established in 2008, it provides undergraduate medical education and is affiliated with Guru Gobind Singh Indraprastha University.

=== Army College of Dental Sciences ===
The Army College of Dental Sciences (ACDS) at Secunderabad provides undergraduate and postgraduate dental education.

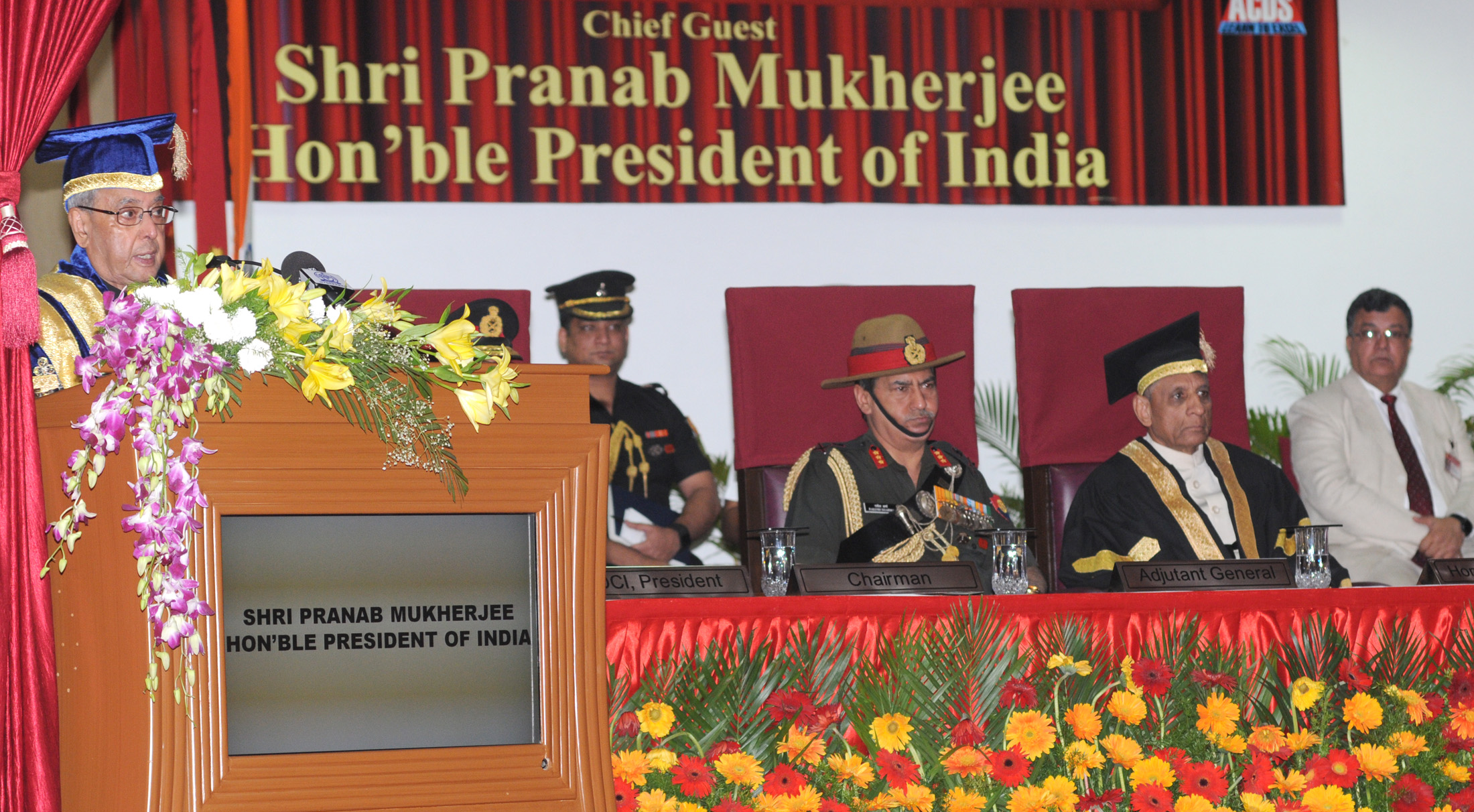
President Pranab Mukherjee addressing a convocation of the Army College of Dental Sciences in 2016.

=== Army Institute of Law ===
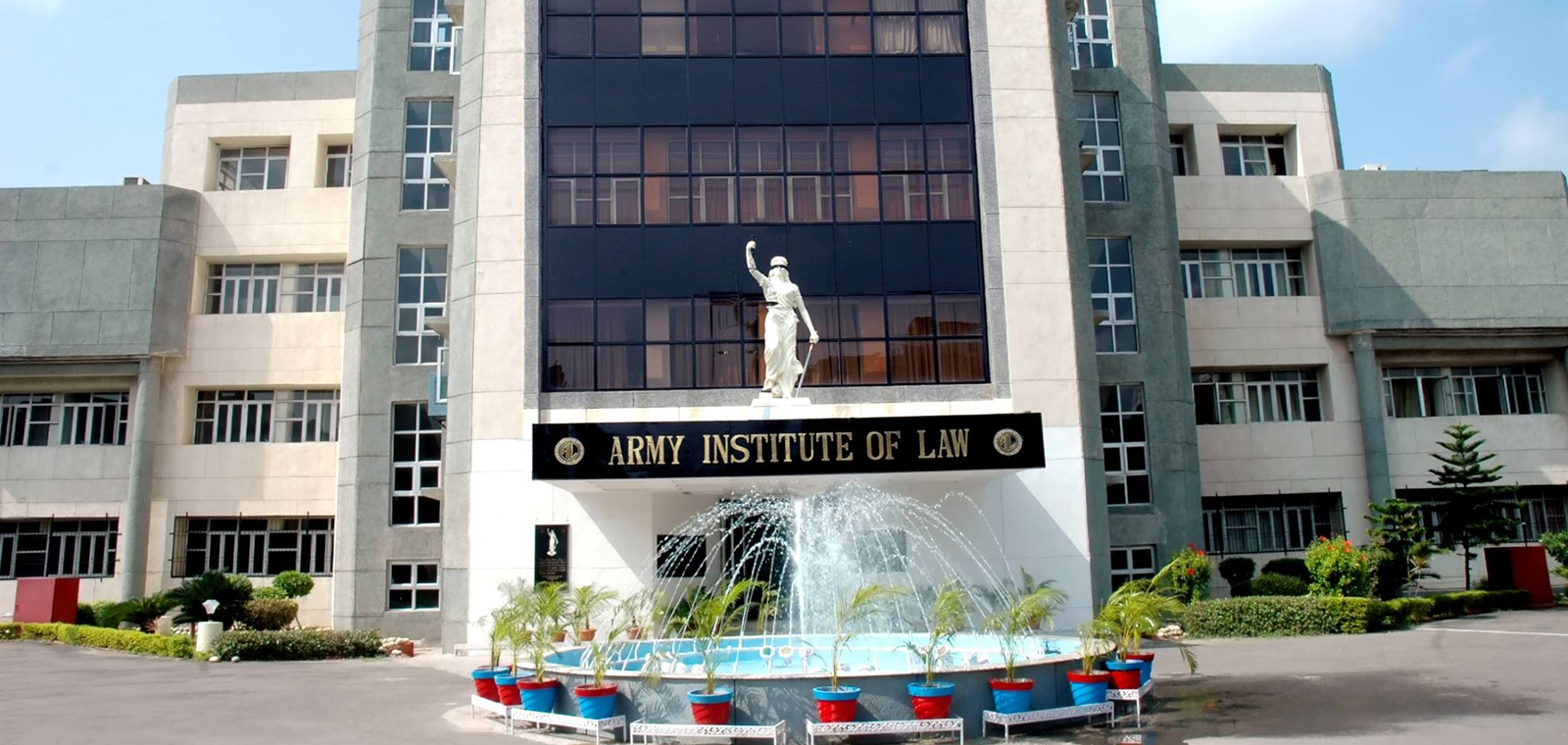
The Army Institute of Law campus at Mohali.

The Army Institute of Law (AIL) was established in 1999 and operates at Mohali, Punjab.

It provides undergraduate and postgraduate legal education.

=== Army Institute of Management ===
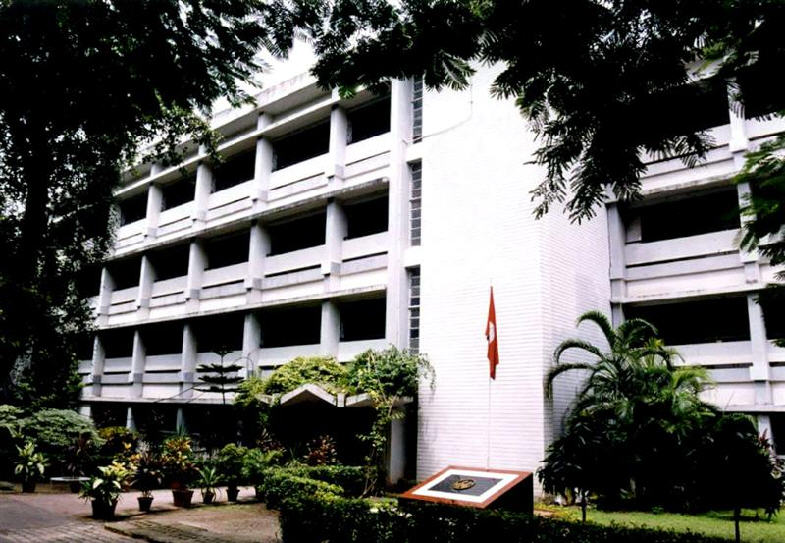
Army Institute of Management, Kolkata.

The Army Institute of Management, Kolkata provides postgraduate management education.

It forms part of AWES's professional-education network serving Army families.

== Governance ==
AWES has a multi-level governance structure connecting Army Headquarters, Army Commands and local military formations.

The Chief of the Army Staff serves as Patron-in-Chief. Army Commanders serve as patrons at command level.

The Board of Governors is the principal policy-making body of the society. An Executive Committee headed by the Adjutant General implements the broad directions of the Board of Governors.

The central AWES secretariat is administered by a Managing Director, traditionally a retired Army officer of major-general rank.

At the individual-school level, Army Public Schools operate through local School Administration and Management Committees under formation commanders.

This structure permits central coordination of education policy while retaining local administration at individual military stations.

== Legal status ==
AWES is a society registered under the Societies Registration Act, 1860 rather than a statutory government body.

In 2024, the Supreme Court of India held in Army Welfare Education Society, New Delhi v. Sunil Kumar Sharma that AWES was not a "State" within the meaning of Article 12 of the Constitution of India for the employment dispute before it.

The Jammu and Kashmir and Ladakh High Court subsequently noted that the relationship between AWES and its employees is generally contractual and that the society's schools are financially autonomous rather than government-funded institutions.

== Objectives ==
The stated objectives of AWES include:

- providing educational facilities for children of serving and retired Army personnel;
- creating technical, professional and vocational education opportunities;
- operating co-educational Army Public Schools at affordable cost;
- coordinating curriculum and teacher development for Army Pre Primary Schools;
- enabling continuity of schooling for children affected by military postings;
- promoting academic achievement, discipline and character development;
- encouraging sports and co-curricular activities;
- expanding hostel facilities where required; and
- improving professional skills among teachers and educational staff.

== Faculty Development and Research Centre ==
The Faculty Development and Research Centre (FDRC) at Shankar Vihar is AWES's central teacher-development facility.

The centre was established in 2009 to provide professional development and training for teaching and administrative staff.

Its programmes include workshops, seminars, curriculum training, leadership development and exposure to new teaching methods and educational technology.

FDRC programmes have also involved teachers from institutions outside the Army Public School network, including other military and security-force school systems.

== Scale and educational network ==
AWES has developed into one of India's largest centrally coordinated school networks.

Its educational structure encompasses:

Level	Institutions	Role
Early childhood	Approximately 250 Army Pre Primary Schools	Pre-primary and early-childhood education
School education	More than 130 Army Public Schools	Primary, secondary and senior-secondary education
Higher education	12 professional colleges and institutes	Engineering, medicine, dentistry, management, law, nursing, education, hospitality and design
Teacher development	Faculty Development and Research Centre	Training and professional development

== Gallery ==
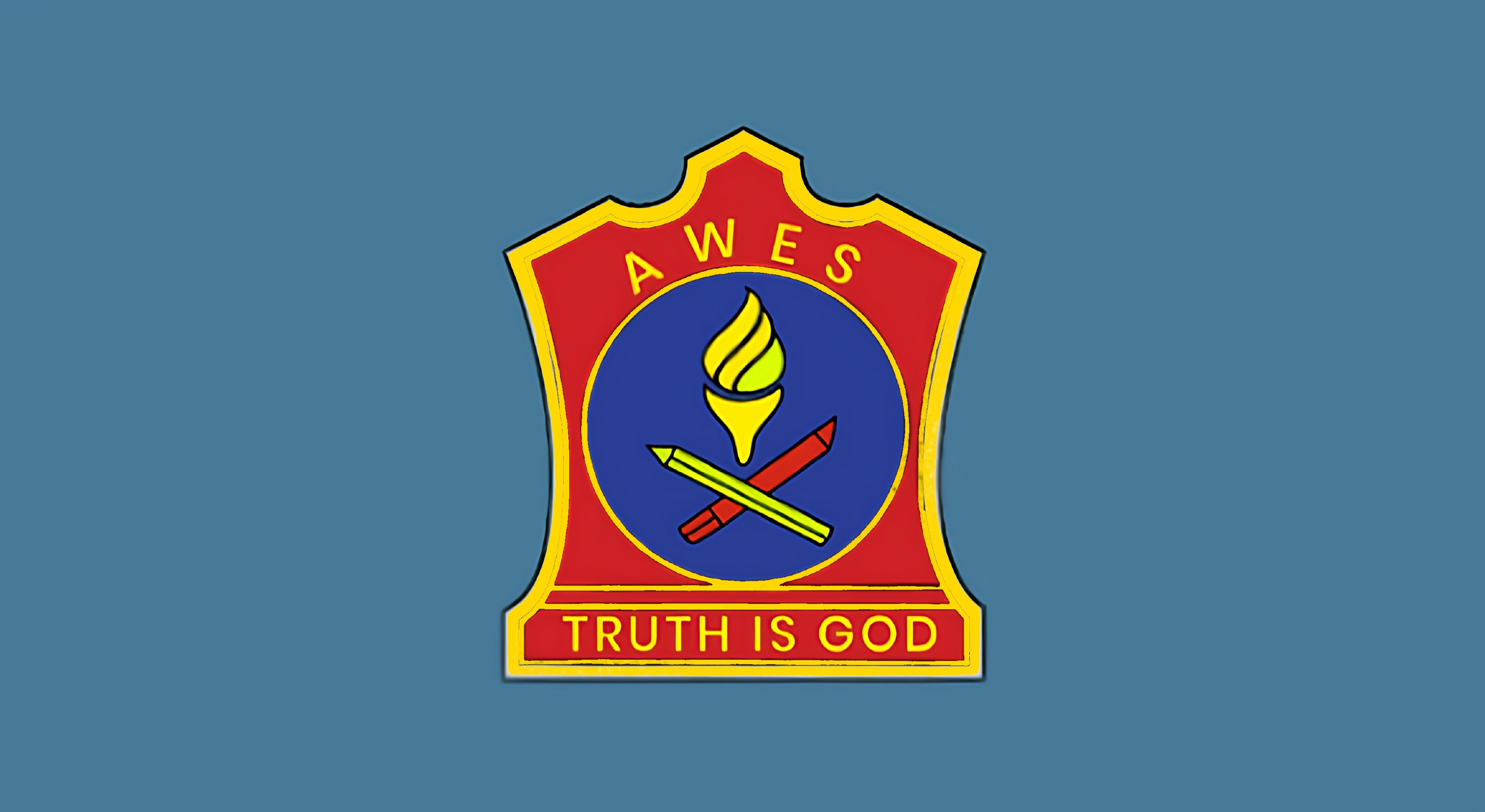
Flag of the Army Welfare Education Society

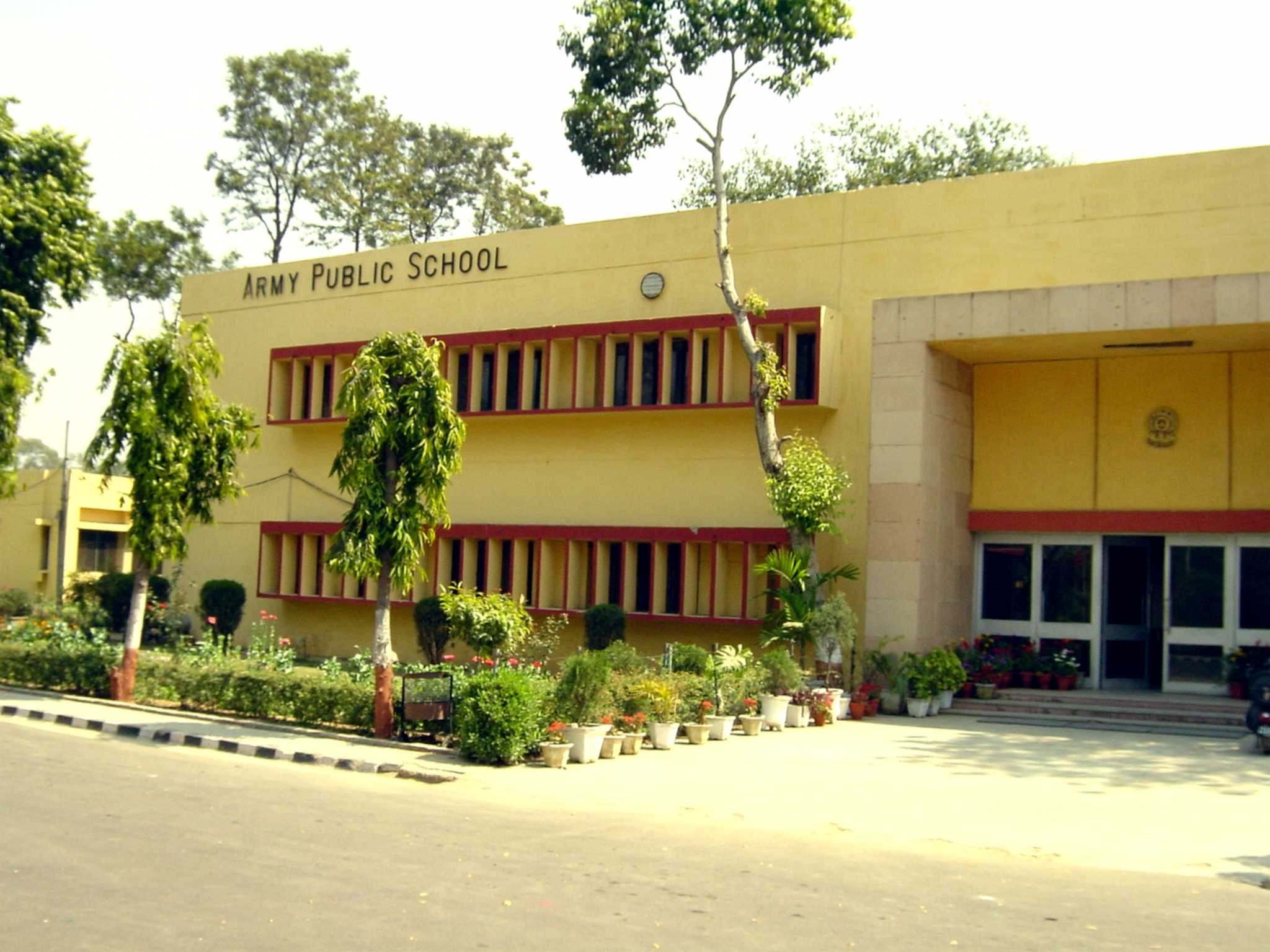
Army Public School, Dhaula Kuan, New Delhi

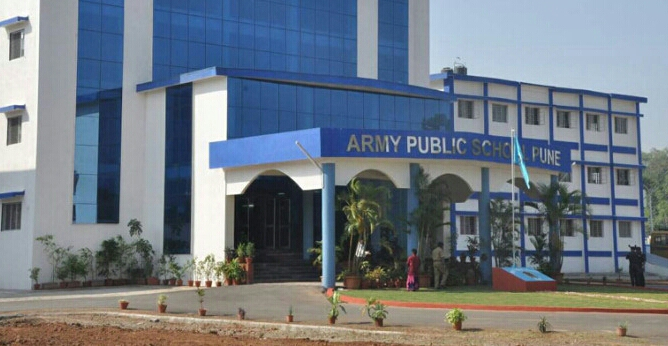
Army Public School, Pune

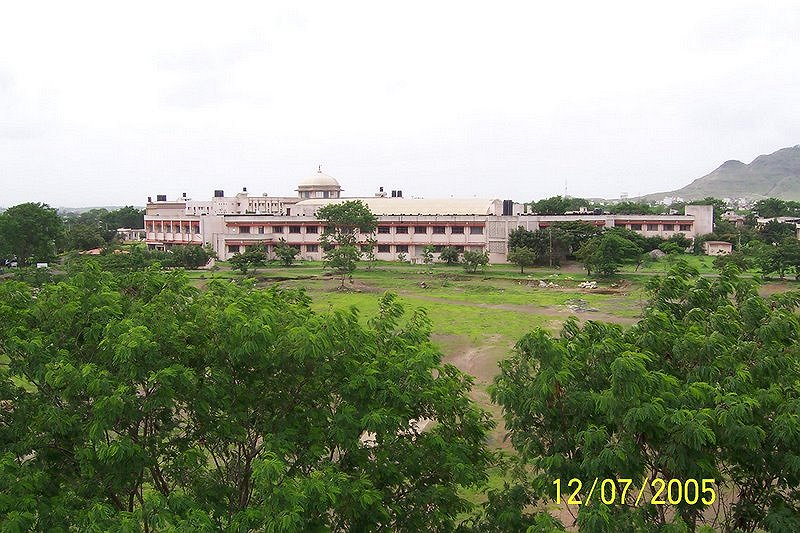
Army Institute of Technology, Pune

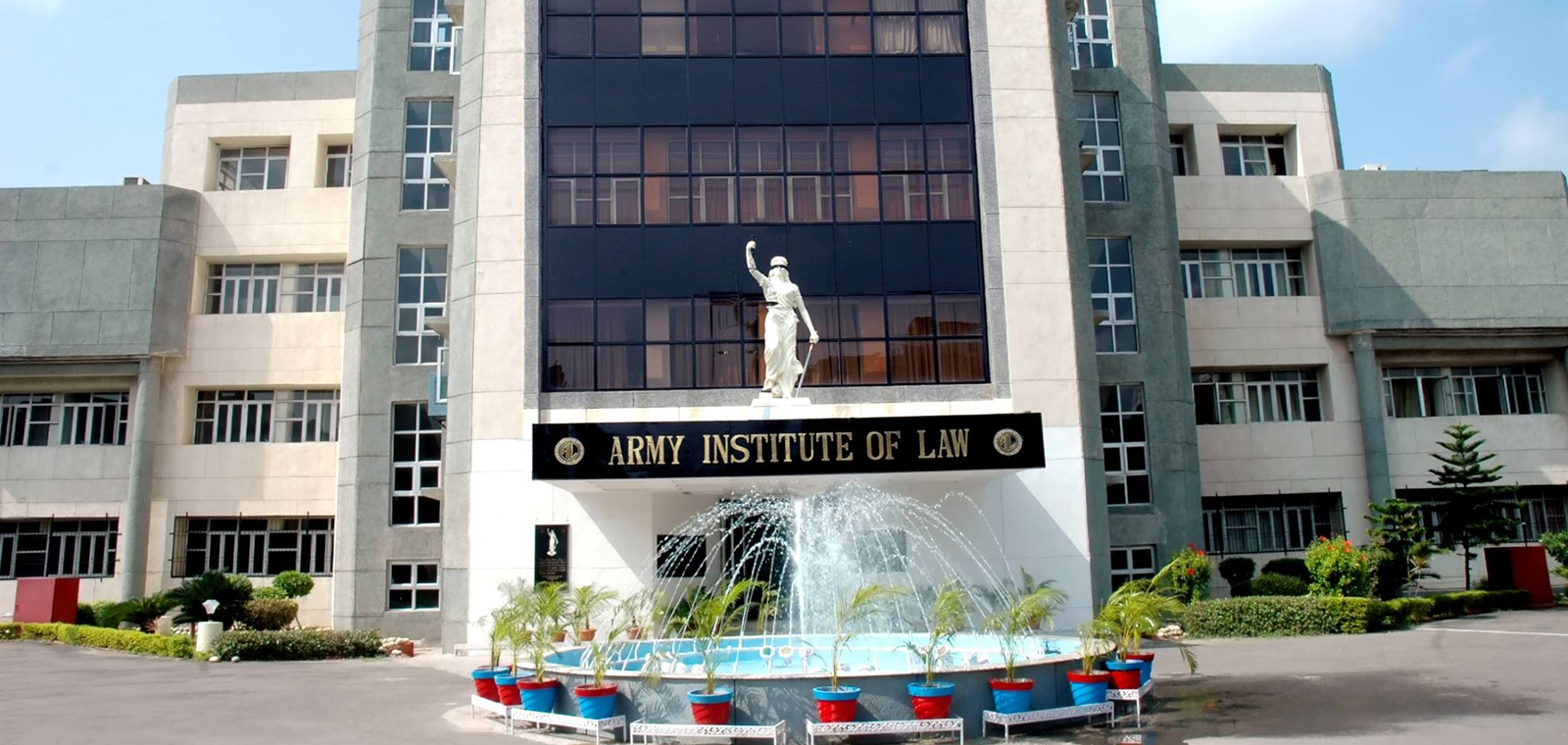
Army Institute of Law, Mohali

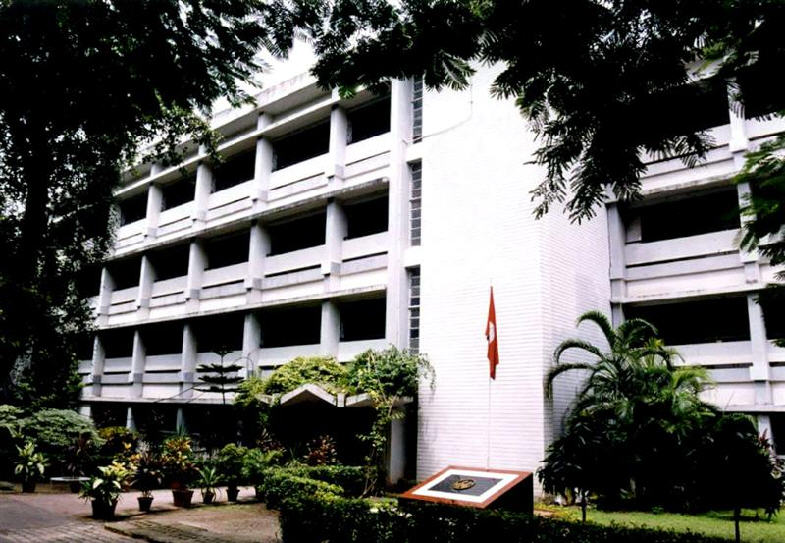
Army Institute of Management, Kolkata

== See also ==
- Indian Army
- Indian Army Public Schools
- Army Welfare Placement Organisation
- Army Wives Welfare Association
- Army Public School, Dhaula Kuan
- Army Public School, Shankar Vihar
- Army Institute of Technology
- Army College of Medical Sciences
- Army Institute of Law
- Central Board of Secondary Education
