= Indian Army Public Schools =

The Army Public Schools of India
- Various locations across India; India

Information
- Motto: Truth Is God
- Established: 1983; 43 years ago
- School board: CBSE
- Oversight: Army Welfare Education Society (AWES)
- Patron-in-Chief: Chief of Army Staff
- Staff: 12,000+
- Faculty: 8,500+
- Enrollment: 230,000+
- Classes: I to XII
- Website: www.awesindia.com

The Indian Army Public Schools (APS) are a chain of educational institutions under regional commands of Indian Army established for the purpose of providing education to the children of Indian armed forces personnel. With a nationwide presence spanning 137 schools, it is one of the largest chains of schools in India. The Army Welfare Education Society (AWES), which was founded in 1983, oversees the management of the APS system, and has established over 137 Army Public schools and 249 Army pre-primary schools across the country, as well as several institutions of higher education.

Since their inception, APSs have witnessed significant growth, with a student population of around 20,000 in 1987 expanding to a mammoth system with a current student strength of approximately 2.3 lakh and 8,500 teaching staff. On average, 5,000 students are added to the APS system every year.

== Overview ==
In general, the management of schools is overseen by the regional commands of the army, and the educational pattern followed is that of the Central Board of Secondary Education (CBSE). Admission priority is given to children of army personnel. Additionally, each Army school is led by a chairman, who is a senior Indian Army officer holding the rank of brigadier, and a patron, who holds the rank of major general.

== Historical background ==
The concept of Army Public Schools was initiated on January 15, 1980, when the Chief of Army Staff recognized the need for dedicated schools for army children. Initially, a few schools were established under various regional commands, but the system expanded rapidly. On April 29, 1983, the Army Welfare Education Society (AWES) was formally registered under the Societies Registration Act XXI of 1860 to oversee the administration and development of these institutions.

== Administration and oversight ==
Each Army Public School operates under the guidance of local formation commanders through School Administration and Management Committees. The overall governance falls under AWES, with the Chief of Army Staff serving as the Patron-in-Chief, while Army Commanders act as regional patrons. This hierarchical structure ensures strict discipline, efficiency, and high academic standards in APS institutions.

== List of Army Public Schools of India (not all-inclusive) ==
1. Army Public School, Amritsar
2. Army Goodwill School, Potha, Jammu and Kashmir
3. Army Public School, Agartala
4. Army Public School, Agra
5. Army Public School, Ayodhya
6. Army Public School, Ahmedabad Cantt
7. Army Public School, Ahmednagar
8. Army Public School, Ambala Cantt
9. Army Public School, Alwar
10. Army Public School, ASC Center and College
11. Army Public School, Babina
12. Army Public School, Bagrakote
13. Army Public School, Ballygunge
14. Army Public School, Bareilly
15. Army Public School, Barrackpore
16. Army Public School, Basistha
17. Army Public School, Bathinda
18. Army Public School, Beas
19. Army Public School, Bangalore
20. Army Public School, Bengdubi
21. Army Public School, Bhopal
22. Army Public School, Bhuj
23. Army Public School, Bikaner
24. Army Public School, Shillong
25. Army Public School, Binnaguri
26. Army Public School, Bolarum
27. Army Public School, Chandimandir
28. Army Public School, Clement town, Dehradun
29. Army Public School, Chennai
30. Army Public School, Dagshai
31. Army Public School, Danapur Cantt
32. Army Public School, Damana, J&K
33. Army Public School, Dehu Road
34. Army Public School, Delhi Road
35. Army Public School, Delhi Cantt
36. Army Public School, Shankar Vihar, Delhi Cantt
37. Army Public School, Dhaula Kuan, Delhi Cantt
38. Army Public School, Devlali
39. Army Public School, Dhrangadhra
40. Army Public School, Dighi
41. Army Public School, Dinjan
42. Army Public School, Fatehgarh Cantt
43. Army Public School, Faridkot
44. Army Public School, Fazilka
45. Army Public School, Ferozpur Cantt
46. Army Public School, Gangtok
47. Army Public School, Gopalpur Cantt
48. Army Public School, Gorakhpur
49. Army Public School, Gurdaspur
50. Army Public School, Gwalior
51. Army Public School, Hisar
52. Army Public School, Jabalpur
53. Army Public School, Jaipur
54. Army Public School, Jhansi Cantt
55. Army Public School, Jodhpur
56. Army Public School, Jorhat
57. Army Public School, Kaluchak, J&K
58. Army Public School, Kanpur Cantt
59. Army Public School, Kamptee
60. Army Public School, NDA, Khadakwasla
61. Army Public School, Kamraj Road
62. Army Public School, Kashipur
63. Army Public School, Kirkee
64. Army Public School, Kannur
65. Army Public School, Lalgarh Jattan
66. Army Public School, Lansdowne
67. Army Public School, Leh, Phyang.
68. Army Public School, Lucknow, Nehru Road
69. Army Public School, Lucknow, Lal Bahadur Shastri Marg
70. Army Public School, Lucknow, SP Marg
71. Army Public School, Mamun Cantt
72. Army Public School, Mathura Cantt
73. Army Public School, Meerut Cantt
74. Army Public School, Mhow
75. Army Public School, Mumbai
76. Army Public School, Nabha
77. Army Public School, Nahan
78. Army Public School, Namkun Cantt
79. Army Public School, Narangi
80. Army Public School, Nasirabad
81. Army public School, Noida
82. Army Public School, Nagrota
83. Army Public School, Panagarh
84. Army Public School, Parachute Regiment Training Centre, Karnataka
85. Army Public School, Patiala
86. Army Public School, Potha
87. Army Public School, Pathankot
88. Army Public School, Pune
89. Army Public School, New Cantt. Prayagraj
90. Army Public School, Raiwala
91. Army Public School Rangapahar
92. Army Public School, Rorkee
93. Army Public School, Ramgarh Cantt
94. Army Public School, Samba.
95. Army Public School, Sagar
96. Army Public School, Shankar Vihar
97. Army Public School, Sukna
98. Army Public School, Suratgarh
99. Army Public School, Tenga Valley
100. Army Public School, Tezpur
101. Army Public School, Tibri
102. Army Public School, Trivandrum
103. Army Public School, Udhampur, J&K
104. Army Public School, Umroi Cantt
105. Army Public School, Varanasi
106. Army Public School, Yol Cantt
107. Army Public School, Pithoragarh
108. Army Public School, Rakhmuthi, J&K
109. Army Public School, Jammu cantt, J&K
110. Army Public School, Ratnuchak, J&K
111. Army Public School, Akhnoor, J&K
112. Army Public School, Sunjuwan, J&K
113. Army Public School, Miran Sahib, J&K
114. Army Public School, Dhar road, Udhampur, J&K
115. Army Public School, Srinagar, J&K
116. Army Public School, Samba, J&K
117. Army Public School, Bathinda
118. Army Public School, Unchi Bassi
119. Army Public School, Janglot, J&K
120. Army Public School, RK Puram, Secunderabad
121. Army Public School, Old Cantt, Prayagraj
