= War Widows Association, New Delhi =

War Widows Association (WWA) is a registered non-governmental civilian organisation based in New Delhi, India, for the support of women who have lost their husbands to war. The association has reached out to and supported the widows of the 1965 Indo-Pakistani War, the 1971 Indo-Pak war, the Kargil War in 1999 as well as the widows of the CRPF personnel killed in the Pulwama attack in 2019.

== Description ==
WWA was formed by women who were affected by the trauma of the 1965 Indo-Pakistani War to provide support to wives who had lost their husbands in the 1971 Indo-Pak war; this was the impetus for the formation of the War Widows Association in 1972 with its chairperson as V.Mohini Giri. The group found out that the main concerns of the widows after losing their husbands were "shelter, jobs and dignity". The widows also struggled with supporting their children. With these findings, the group approached Prime Minister Indira Gandhi who promised her support for the empowerment of the widows along with the construction of Shaheed Bhawan, Aruna Asaf Ali Marg for the usage of WWA. After the Kargil War, with almost no resources, WWA offered to provide housing and transport facilities for the families of the soldiers hospitalized in Delhi. Wing Commander N. K. Pant (Retd) explains that "the majority of the killed and wounded soldiers are in the age group of 23 to 25 years, and most of them have left behind young widows and infants". The organisations holds events on occasions like Vijay Diwas, the end of the Indo-Pakistan war of 1971.

== Mission ==
The following mission became its mandate:

To ensure for widows of war and armed conflict their human rights to live a respectful life even after their loved ones are no more. This involves a continuous struggle to provide economic and emotional support, guidance and assistance to war widows so that they can be comfortably rehabilitated in society. WWA works for the welfare of the war affected families, guiding and advising family members to become economically independent.

== See also ==
- War Widows Association of Great Britain
- Army Wives Welfare Association, India
