= War widow =

Woman who has become widowed as a result of warfare

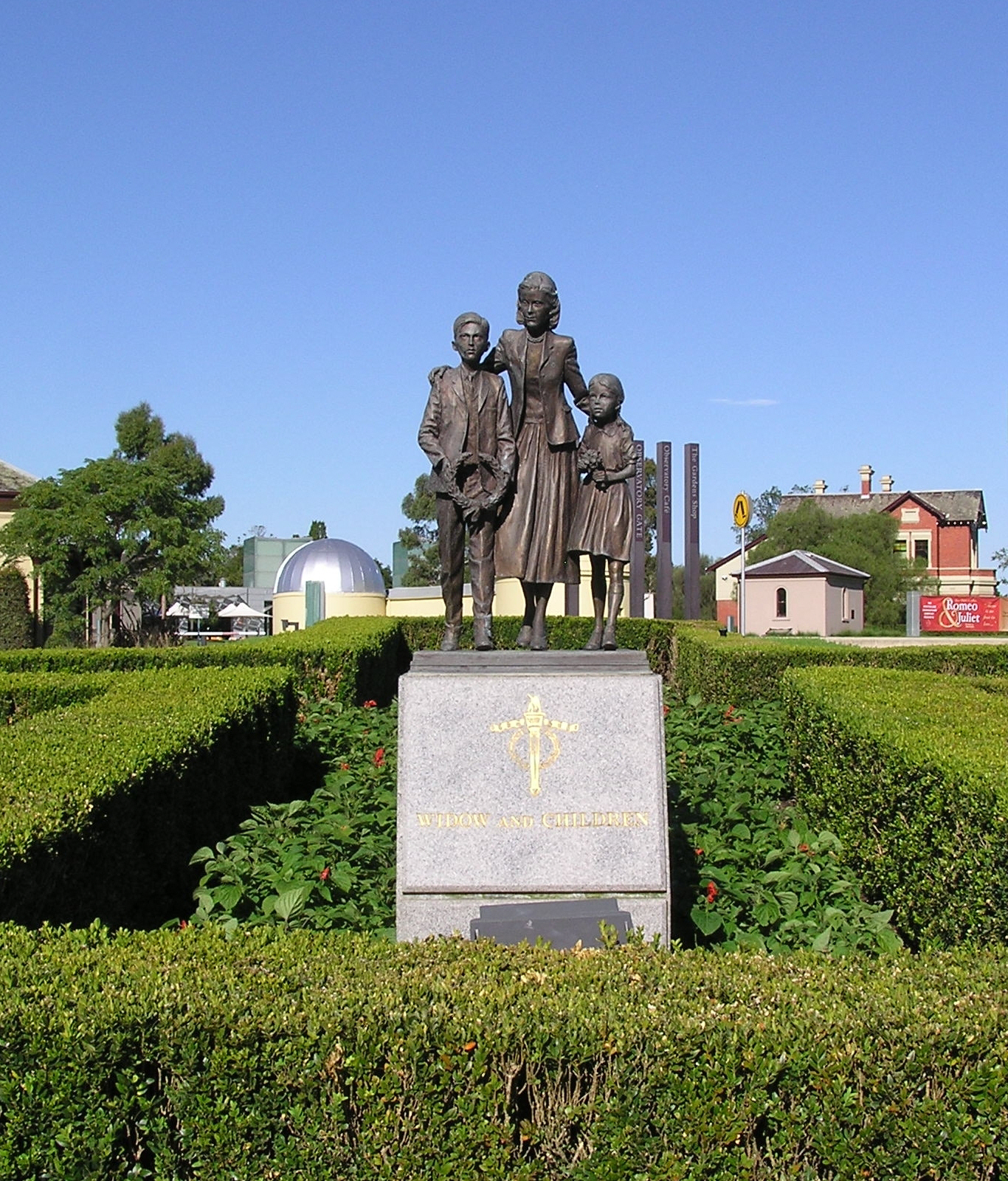
"Widow and Children", Shrine of Remembrance, Melbourne

A war widow is a wife who has become widowed as a direct consequence of any kind of warfare. This definition includes widows of both servicemen and civilians. For legal purposes one may distinguish de jure war widows, i.e., those who have legal grounds to claim the war-related widowhood, and de facto war widows. In some jurisdictions, war widows may be legally defined as "the spouses of servicemen killed in action". These widows may receive special treatment, such as special widow's pensions or honors at military ceremonies. In addition to personal experience, war widowhood has profound socio-demographic and economic effects on the society.

== Associations for war widows ==
- Army Wives Welfare Association
- War Widows Association, New Delhi
- War Widows' Guild of Australia NSW
- War Widows Association of Great Britain

== See also ==
- American Civil War widows who survived into the 21st century
- Marriage with a deceased wife's sister
- War bride
- War children
