= APSC =

APSC may refer to:

- APS-C, the Advanced Photo System type-C image sensor format
- The African People's Solidarity Committee, a committee of the African People's Socialist Party
- Alaska Police Standards Council
- The Arkansas Public Service Commission
- The Australian Public Service Commission
- The Association of Southeast Asian Nations Political-Security Community
- The Assam Public Service Commission
- The Army Public School, Chennai, a public school in Chennai, India
