= Army Public School, Ballygunge =

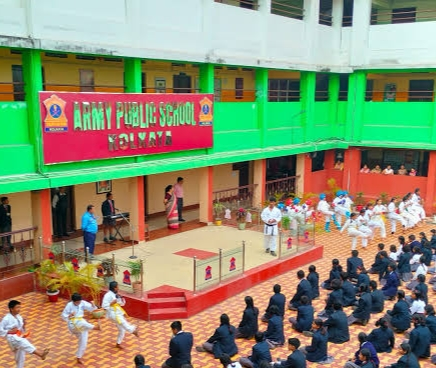

Location
- Ballygunge Military Camp- B.M.C. Kolkata, West Bengal, 700019; India

Information
- Type: Military school
- Motto: Truth is God
- Established: 01 April 1994; 32 years ago
- School board: Central Board of Secondary Education
- Authority: Army Welfare Education Society
- Oversight: Indian Army Public Schools
- Campus: Ballygunge Maidan Camp
- Houses: Red (Bose), Green (Raman), Blue (Bhava) & Yellow (Khurana).
- Website: apskolkata.co.in

Army Public School is an English-medium co-ed school located at Ballygunge, Kolkata, India. The school offers education up to 10+2 with 3 major streams in the +2 level. The school was established in 1994 with 7 teachers and 173 students. The school is affiliated to the CBSE.

== History ==
The school was established in 1994 with 7 teachers and 173 students.The school is affiliated to the CBSE.

Current Principal	Dr. Suchitra Bandopadhyay
Preceded by	Dr. Suchitra Bhattacharya

== House system ==
House
Bhava
Khurana
Raman
Bose

== Awards ==
Army Public School, Ballygunge won the national recognition for its efforts in water conservation and eco-friendly practices. Led by principal Suchitra Bandyopadhyay and with the support of the Indian Army, the school received an award at the 6th National Water Awards 2025.
