= Army Public School, Bhopal =

Secondary School

Coordinates: 23.298°N 77.375°E

The Army Public School, Bhopal is a secondary school established in 1978 by the former Commander, Madhya Pradesh Sub Area, Brigadier K.P. Pande, MVC, FRGS in the form of Bal Vidya Vihar with the vision of providing low cost and quality education to the wards of defence personnel. It became Army Public School in Bairagarh in the barracks of 3 EME Centre.

It was inaugurated by Lt Gen Chandra Shekher, AVSM GOC21 Corps, and Founder Chairman Brig Ramesh Bhatia, VSM & Bar, Cdr MP Sub Area on 17 July 1995.

Class X started in 1997 and Class XII started in 2000. 11 batches have passed out since the 2000-01 session.

The school was renamed Army Public School, Bhopal, and is operated by the Indian Army.

== Affiliation ==
Central Board of Secondary Education, Affiliation No. 1080008

== Streams ==
Science, Commerce & Humanities (XI & XII)

== Infrastructure ==
Army Public School, Bhopal is presently functioning in its new premises with all amenities and infrastructure constructed under Major Works Project of Army Headquarters, New Delhi, located at Dronanchal Neori Hills with its new identity as Army Public School, Bhopal. The new building at Dronanchal was inaugurated on 25 July 2008 by Kirti Kapoor (wife of General Deepak Kapoor PVSM, AVSM, SM, VSM, ADC), President, Central FWO (Family Welfare Organization).

== School statistics ==
- Number of students: 2160
- Number of rooms: 116
- Classrooms: 40
- Number of sections: 52
- Teaching staff: 82
- Non Teaching staff: 41
- Labs: 3
- IT labs: 4
- Libraries: 2

The school also has Mini Audi, Conf. Hall, Management Office, Visitor Room, AV Room, Canteen, Stationery Shop, Principal's Office, Art Room, Science Labs, Computer Labs, Library, Music Room, Sports Room, Dance Room, and Playway Room.
