= V. Mohini Giri =

Indian activist (1938–2023)

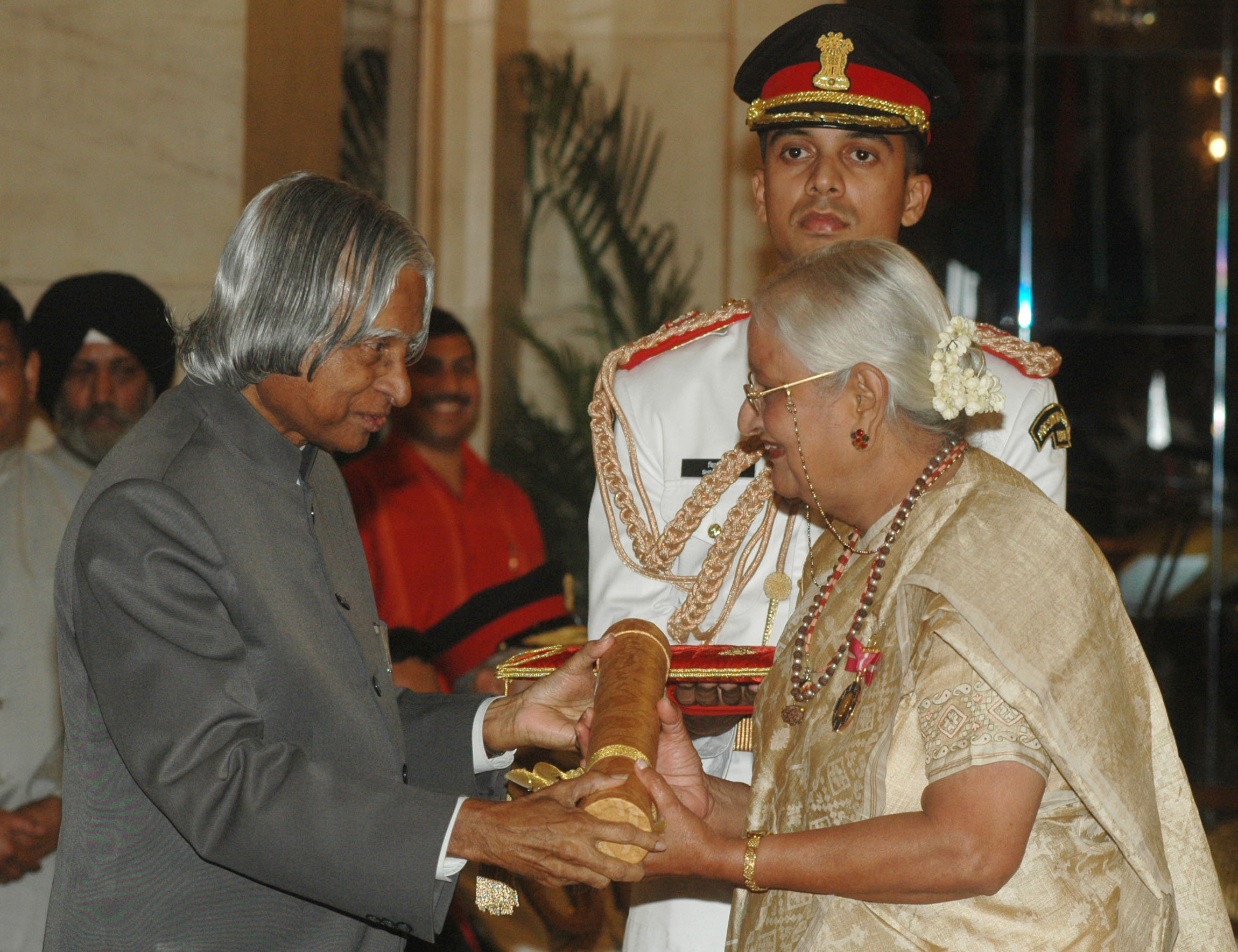
- Giri (right) receiving Padma Bhushan from President Kalam in 2007
- Born: 15 January 1938; Lucknow, United Provinces, British India
- Died: 19 December 2023 (aged 85)
- Occupations: Social worker, activist founder Guild of Service (1979)

V. Mohini Giri (15 January 1938 – 19 December 2023) was an Indian community service worker and activist, who was Chairperson of the Guild of Service, a New Delhi-based social service organisation. Established in 1979, it provides advocacy for women's and children's rights for education, employment, and financial security. She founded War Widows Association, New Delhi in 1972, and was Chairperson of the National Commission for Women (1995–1998).

In 2007, she was awarded the Padma Bhushan, India's third highest civilian honour, given by Government of India. Academy of Grassroots Studies and Research of India (AGRASRI), Tirupati, awarded her the Rajiv Gandhi Outstanding Leadership National Award for the year 2010 on 8 March 2011 at New Delhi, by Shri Murlidhar C. Bhandare, the then Governor of Odisha. Dr. Giri delivered the 9th Rajiv Gandhi Memorial Lecture at India International Centre, New Delhi on 8 March 2011.

== Early life and education ==
Giri was the daughter-in-law of V. V. Giri, former President of India. She was born in Lucknow to scholar V. S. Ram. She graduated from Lucknow University, followed by post-graduation in Ancient Indian History from University of Delhi, and a doctorate from G.B. Pant University of Agriculture and Technology.

== Career ==
Giri started her career as an academic and established the women's studies department at Lucknow University. Giri was the Founder President of the War Widows Association which was formed in 1972 after the Indo-Pakistani War of 1971 and in 2000 became the Founder Trustee of the Women's Initiative for Peace in South Asia.

Giri was also a board member of The Hunger Project, a New York-based international charity.

== Death ==
Giri died on 19 December 2023, at the age of 85.

== Bibliography ==
- V. Mohini Giri (2006). Deprived Devis: Women's Unequal Status in Society. Gyan Publishing House, New Delhi.
- V. Mohini Giri; Meera Khanna (2021). Mantras For Positive Ageing. Pippa Rann Books and Media, UK.
- V. Mohini Giri; Srinivasan Gokilvani (1997). Reaching the Unreachable Women's Participation in Panchayat Raj Administration: A Feministic Study on the Role Performance and Experiences of Elected Women in Sivaganga District. Department of Women's Studies, Alagappa University.
