= Army College of Medical Sciences =

College in New Delhi, India

- Other name: ACMS
- Motto: Knowledge Empoweres
- Type: Medical college and hospital
- Established: 2008; 18 years ago
- Affiliations: National Medical Commission
- Academic affiliations: Guru Gobind Singh Indraprastha University
- Dean: Maj. Gen. (Dr.) Surendra Mohan, VSM (Retd.)
- Undergraduates: 100 per year
- Location: Brar Square, Near Base Hospital, Delhi Cantt, New Delhi, Delhi, 110010, India
- Campus: Urban
- Website: www.theacms.in

Army College of Medical Sciences (also known as ACMS New Delhi) is an Indian medical college affiliated with Guru Gobind Singh Indraprastha University. It is supported by Army Welfare Education Society (AWES) of Indian Army for wards of serving and retired personnel of the Indian Army. It is situated near Base Hospital Delhi Cantt, New Delhi. The annual intake of students to this college is 100.

== Status ==
It is an army aided college run by Indian army and is among the top 25 medical colleges in India. The college was opened in 2008 for its first batch of MBBS students.the teaching hospital affiliated to the college is base hospital which is run by the armed forces.

1) 2008 - Alpha Batch 2) 2009 - Bravo Batch 3) 2010 - Charlie Batch 4) 2013 - Delta Batch 5) 2014 - Echo Batch 6) 2015 - Foxtrot Batch 7) 2016 - Golf Batch 8) 2017 - Hotel Batch 9) 2018 - India Batch 10) 2019 - Juliet Batch 11) 2020 - Kilo Batch

== Entrance exam ==
NEET UG conducted by National Testing Agency (NTA). Merit list is prepared by the NTA and the same is sent to University, which carries out counselling, and students are admitted.

== Eligibility ==
- Wards of Army person
- He or she should have cleared the higher senior secondary examination from a recognized board or university (or equivalent) in the first attempt with 50 percent PCB and English as compulsory subjects.

== Selection process ==
Once selected in the merit list, students are invited for the counselling processing and admissions are done.

On completion of the course, students can join the armed forces or pursue civil practice.

University and college rankings

Medical – India
- India Today (2024): 23

== See also ==
- Education in India
- Literacy in India
- List of institutions of higher education in Delhi
