= Army Public School, Dhaula Kuan =

The Army Public School

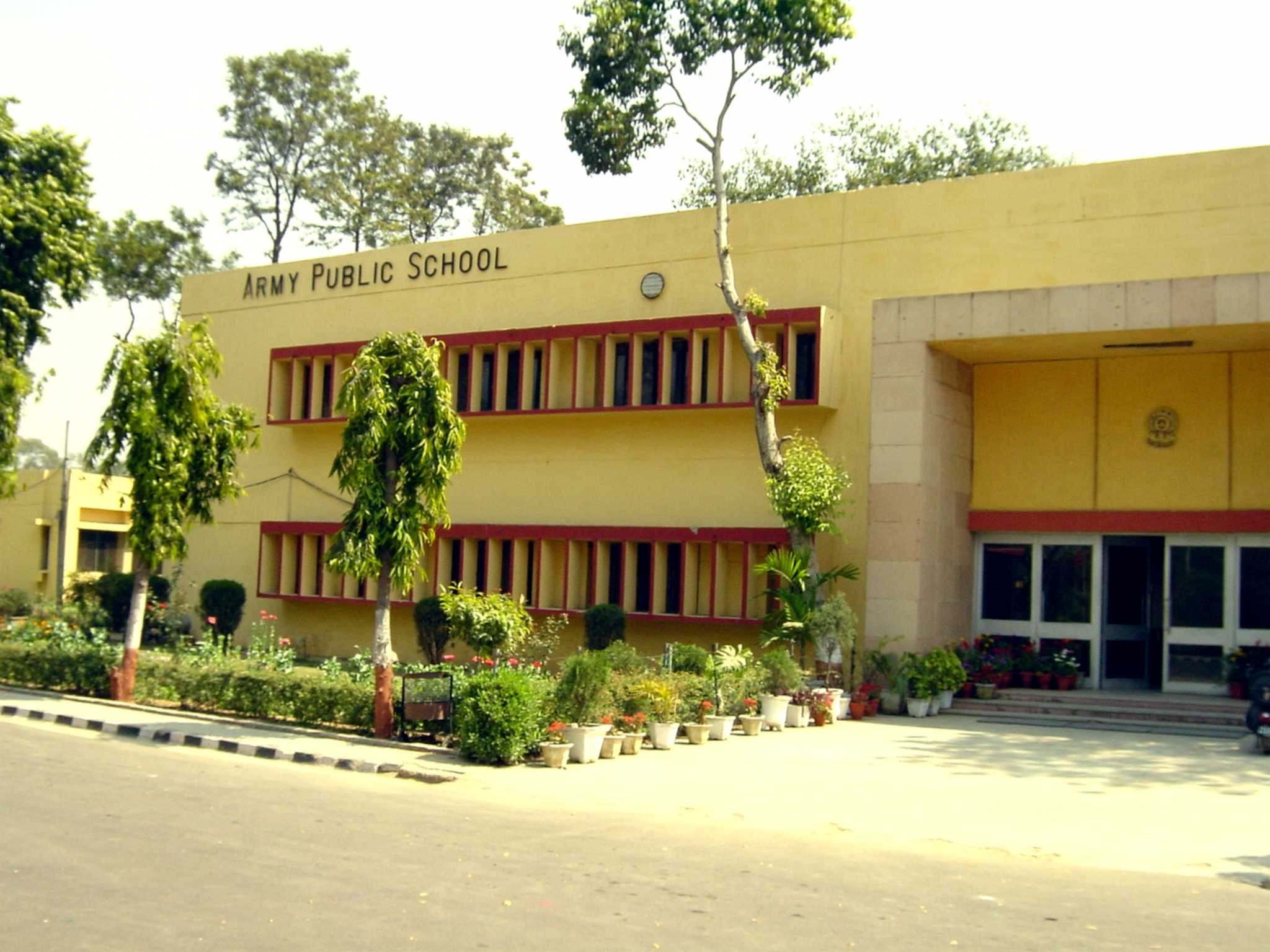
- Dhaula Kuan; New Delhi; India

Information
- Motto: "Truth is God"
- Established: May 1953
- School board: CBSE
- Principal: Mrs. Meetu Rathore
- Event: TAPSFEST-TAPSITE
- Website: www.apsdk.com

The Army Public School, Dhaula Kuan is a public school located at Delhi Cantonment, Delhi (near Dhaula Kuan). It is operated under Indian Army supervision under the aegis of Indian Army welfare Education society (AWES). It is part of the chain of Indian Army Public Schools.

== History ==
In May 1953, the residents of the Maulana Azad Road Officers' Hostel started the institution following the public school pattern, with 21 children and two teachers and named as the Defense Services Public School. The school was extended to eighth standard in July 1959, when it received recognition by the Directorate of Education, Delhi. Soon upgraded to the XI standard, it was affiliated to the University of Cambridge Local Examination Syndicate. The school was renamed as 'Army Public School' in 1976. Later, the school received affiliation to the Central Board of Secondary Education (CBSE). It shifted to its present location on the Ridge Road in July 1970, occupying 31 acres of land.

== Houses ==
The students in the school are divided into four houses:

Houses
Ashoka
Shivaji
Nehru
Pratap

== Notable alumni ==
- Capt Anuj Nayyar, posthumously awarded the Maha Vir Chakra for exemplary valour in combat during operations in the Kargil War in 1999.
- Capt Vijayant Thapar, posthumously awarded the Vir Chakra for exemplary valour in combat during operations in the Kargil War in 1999.
- Gautam Rode, Movie Actor.
- Manisha Koirala, Actor
- Varun Sood, Movie Actor.
- Rannvijay Singha, Actor, Host and VJ
- Chetan Bhagat, Author
