= Army Public School, Shankar Vihar =

Location
- Shankar Vihar; Delhi; India; 28°33′40.02″N 77°8′29.4″E

Information
- Type: Army Public School
- Motto: Truth Is God
- Established: 2007
- School board: CBSE
- Principal: Neena Singh
- Classes: Balvatika 1 (Nursery) to Balvatika 3 (UKG); 1st to 12th grade
- Publication: Anusmriti : Cherished Memories...
- Pincode: 110010
- Headmistress: Garima Bhatnagar
- Co-ordinator: Ruchika Sharma
- Website: APS, Shankar Vihar

Army Public School, Shankar Vihar is a school in Delhi Cantonment, Shankar Vihar, Delhi, India It is a branch of the Army Welfare Education Society (AWES)-controlled Indian Army Public Schools. The school is affiliated with the Central Board of Secondary Education through Directorate of Education.

It also hosts National Level Excellence Awards and English Debate organized by AWES.

The students in the school are divided into four houses:

	Houses
A	Ashoka
B	Buddha
C	Chanakya
D	Dronacharya

== Inception ==
The foundation stone of the school was laid on 17 August 2005 by a general, Mohinder Singh.

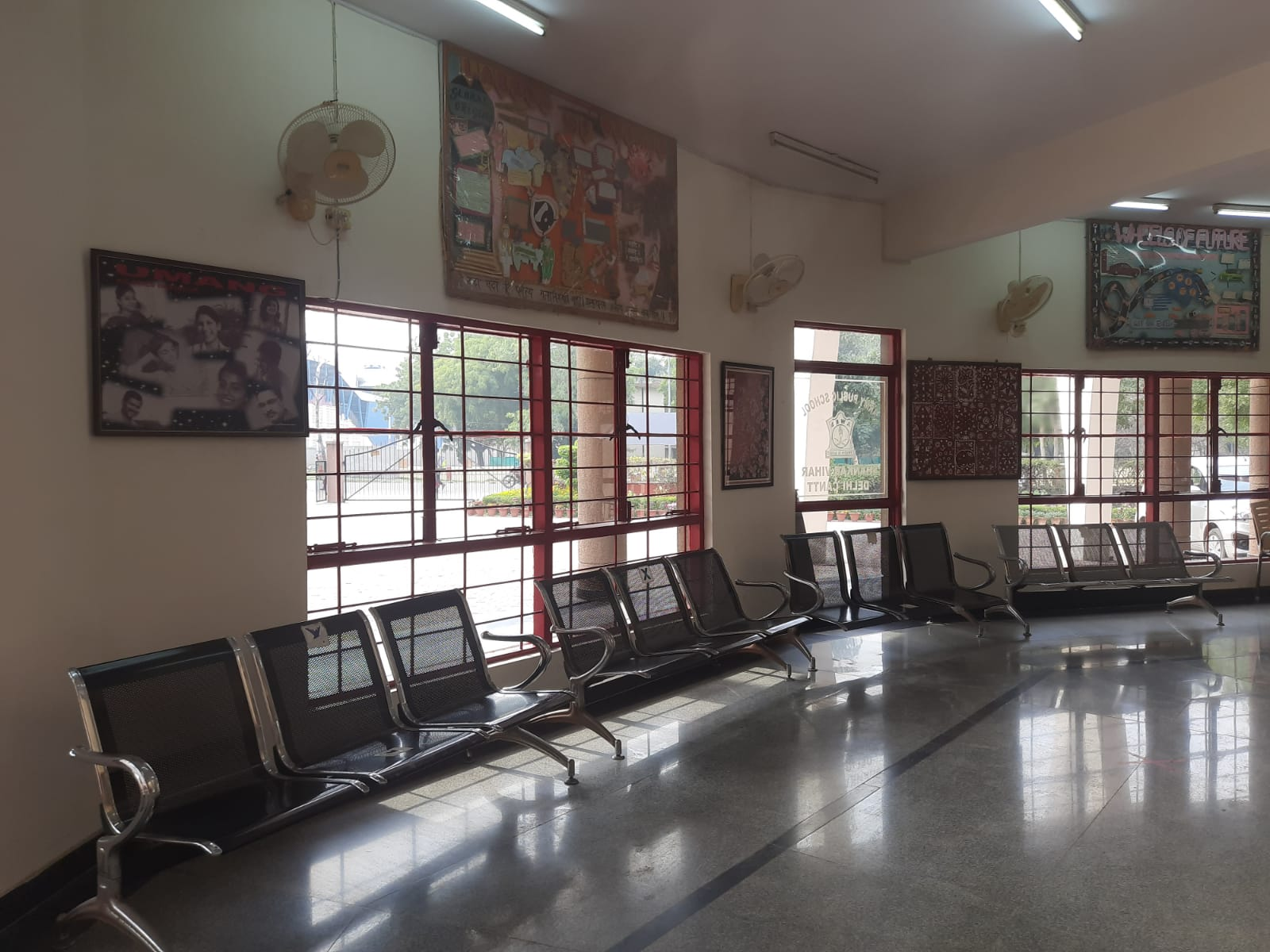
Foyer of APS Shankar Vihar

== Infrastructure and academics ==
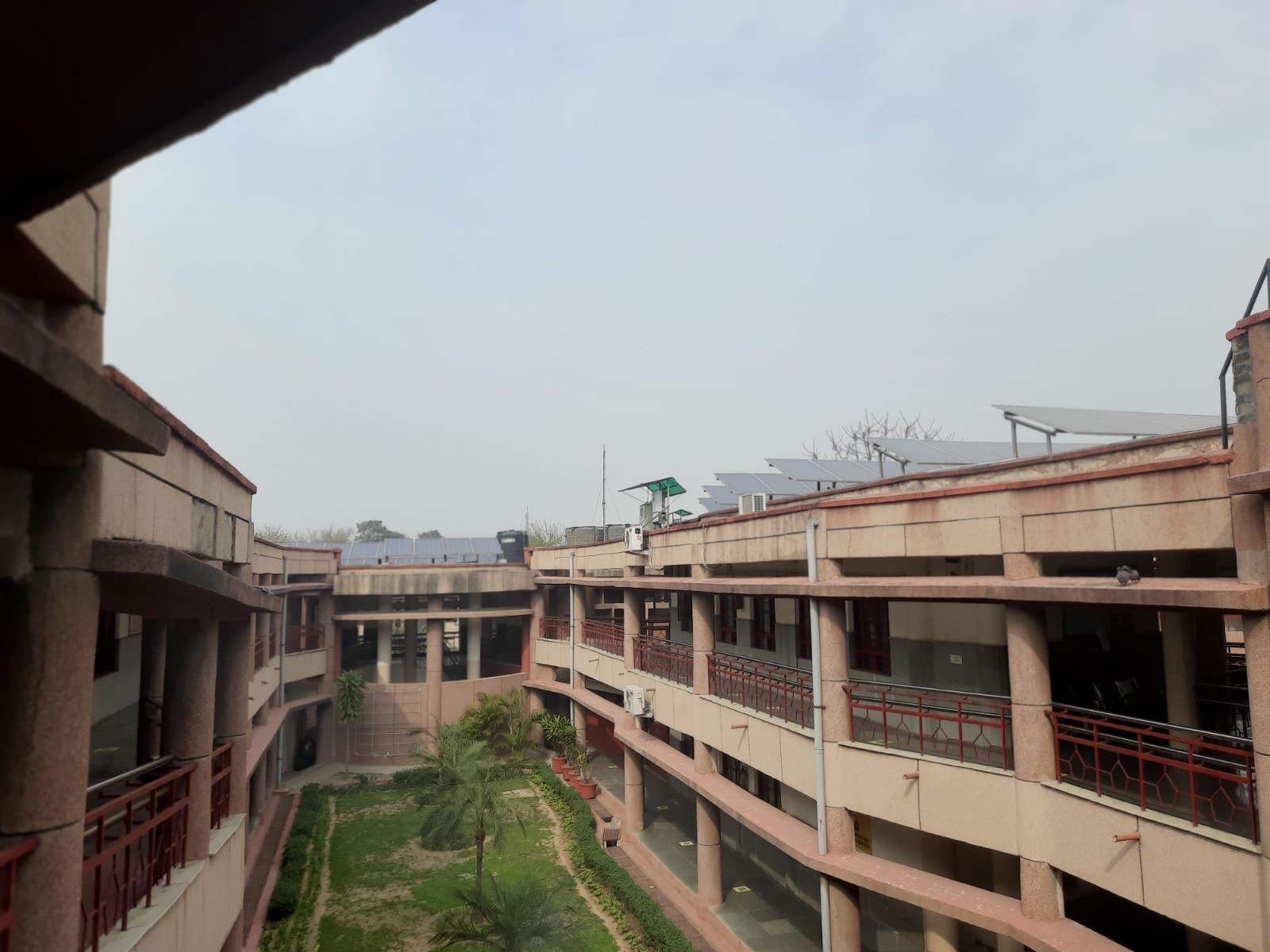
Solar panels, Installed in APS Shankar Vihar

The school is divided into three wings: Primary Wing (Grade 2 to 5), Secondary Wing (Grade 6 to 8), and Senior Secondary Wing (Grade 9 to 12)
