= Army Institute of Management, Kolkata =

Business school in Kolkata, West Bengal

Army Institute of Management Kolkata
- Coat of Arms
- Former name: National Institute of Management Calcutta (1997–2005)
- Motto: Leadership Innovation
- Type: Graduate Business school
- Established: 28 July 1997; 29 years ago
- Accreditation: NAAC
- Academic affiliations: MAKAUT, AICTE, ISO 9001:2015
- Budget: ₹5.60 crore (US$580,000) (FY2023–24 est.)
- Chairperson: Satbir Singh, SM** GOC HQ Bengal Sub Area
- Director: Brig. (Dr.) Sujay Ranjan Chaudhuri (Retd.)
- Faculty: 21 (2025)
- Students: 240 (2025)
- Postgraduates: 240(2025)
- Location: New Town, Kolkata, West Bengal, India; 23°06′45.37″N 86°38′23.27″E
- Campus: Large city
- Website: www.aim.ac.in

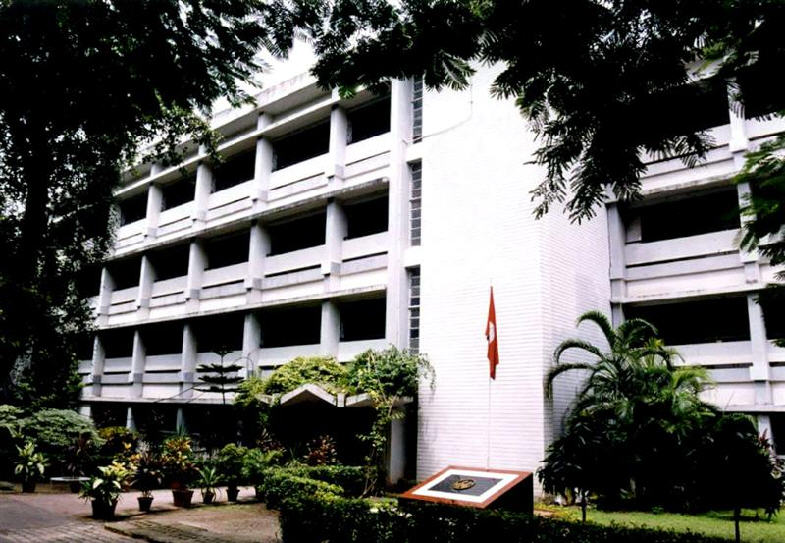
Army Institute of Management Kolkata

The Army Institute of Management, Kolkata (AIM, Kolkata), formerly the National Institute of Management Calcutta (NIMC), is a graduate business school located in Kolkata, India. It was established on 28 July 1997 by the Indian Army under the aegis of Army Welfare Education Society (AWES), New Delhi, to conduct a management programme (MBA) for the wards of Army personnel with an opportunity for general candidates as well. The institute will be inviting the new batch for their BBA programme in July 2022.

== About college ==
The college is affiliated with Maulana Abul Kalam Azad University of Technology and the programme is approved by the All India Council for Technical Education. Also it has been accredited by NAAC. It is also an ISO 9001:2015 certified college.

The old campus was located at Judges Court Road, Alipore. Currently, they are operating from their new campus in New Town, opposite to Downtown Mall and right beside the R&D Campus of IIT Kharagpur.

== Academics ==
The institute offers a single post-graduate course:

- Master of Business Administration – two years [Approved intake – 120]

== Notable alumni ==
- Navdeep Singh

== See also ==
- List of institutions of higher education in West Bengal
- Education in India
- Education in West Bengal
