= Army Institute of Management and Technology, Greater Noida =

Business Schools in India

Coordinates: 28.4423°N 77.5076°E

Army Institute of Management & Technology, Greater Noida
- Motto: "Strive to achieve a unique blend of academic excellence"
- Type: Army Welfare Education Society (AWES) Business School
- Established: 2004
- Affiliations: Guru Gobind Singh Indraprastha University, Delhi
- Director: Maj Gen (Dr) Rajendra Bana, (Retd)
- Students: 420
- Location: (India) Greater Noida, Uttar Pradesh, India
- Website: www.aimt.ac.in

The Army Institute of Management & Technology (AIMT) is a business school established by the Army Welfare Education Society (AWES) in 2004 in Greater Noida, in the northern state of Uttar Pradesh.

== History ==
AWES has so far established 130 Army Schools and 12 professional colleges. Designed to capture the increasing needs of industry for Management and Computer Application professionals for the benefit of the wards of Army personnel, a sprawling new campus of the institute was constructed over an area of 15.34 acres.

== Campus ==
AIMT, Greater Noida has been established to conduct an MBA program in a fully residential campus. Designed to address the increasing needs of industry for Management and Computer Application professionals for the benefit of the wards of Army personnel, a new campus of the institute was constructed over an area of 15.34 acres.

The institute is affiliated to the Guru Gobind Singh Indraprastha University, Delhi. The campus can accommodate nearly 500 students.

The campus also has a residential complex to house all its teaching and non-teaching staff. The institute is located in Greater Noida, which is a part of the National Capital Region(NCR). The city has a well-planned layout with wide roads and green belts and has a large number of educational institutions and industries. The campus is located in Plot No M-1, Pocket P-5 in the immediate vicinity of the AWHO project of Greater Noida. The city is connected to Noida and Delhi by public transport.

== Facilities ==
- Outdoor Sports – Football, Cricket, Volleyball, Badminton, Basketball, Tennis.
- Indoor Sports – Table Tennis, Gymnasium.
- Shopping Facility – Grocery Cum Stationery Shop, CSD Canteen.
- Medical Facility – Doctor available on the campus.

== Events ==
Various contests, events, and tournaments are held throughout the year, giving students a chance to compete among themselves.

- Annual Sports Meet (BASSOCC)
- HR Conclave
- Alumni Meet
- AWES Youth Festival
- AIPL Sports Event
- International Conference
- Alankriti- Cultural Programme
