= Navdeep Singh (Ashoka Chakra) =

Ashoka Chakra recipient (1985–2011)

Lieutenant Navdeep Singh Shan AC
- Born: Navdeep Singh; June 8, 1985; Gurdaspur, Punjab
- Died: 20 August 2011 (aged 26); KIA in Jammu & Kashmir
- Alma mater: Officers Training Academy, Chennai; Army Institute of Management, Kolkata (M.B.A.); Institute of Hotel Management, Gurdaspur (B.Sc.)
- Military career
- Allegiance: India
- Branch: Indian Army
- Service years: 2011
- Rank: Lieutenant
- Units: Army Ordnance Corps; Maratha Light Infantry
- Conflicts: Jammu and Kashmir Insurgency
- Awards: Ashoka Chakra

Lieutenant Navdeep Singh Shan, AC was a Ghatak Platoon Commander of 15 Maratha Light Infantry regiment in the Indian Army.

He led an operation to ambush 17 well-trained and armed terrorists who infiltrated into Jammu and Kashmir state. He killed 4 of the terrorists and brought an injured team member to safety before succumbing to fatal injury from close range. He was posthumously conferred the highest peacetime gallantry award of India Ashoka Chakra by President of India on the 63rd Republic Day.

== Early life and education ==
Born in Gurdaspur, to a Jat Sikh family Singh was a third-generation soldier to serve in the Indian Army. His grandfather was a junior commissioned officer while his father Joginder Singh served as Subedar-major in the Bengal Sappers for 30 years and retired as Honorary Captain. He completed his schooling from Army Public School, Tibri and completed his graduation in B.Sc. in hotel management in 2006 from IHM-Gurdaspur and post-graduation in the Army Institute of Management, Kolkata in 2009, where he received his MBA degree.

== Military career ==
Singh shunned a corporate career and instead joined the Officers Training Academy as a gentleman cadet. He was commissioned into the Army Ordnance Corps, on 19 March 2011. As is the custom for all the non-fighting arms of the Indian Army, officers must complete an attachment of two years with an infantry battalion in a war or counter-insurgency theatre. For the duration of these two years, the officer, for all practical purposes, belongs to the said infantry battalion. Lieutenant Singh was attached to the 15 Maratha Light Infantry in Jammu & Kashmir in his first posting as a commissioned officer.

=== Ambush ===
On 20 August 2011, Singh planned and led the operation to kill or capture 17 armed terrorists in Gurez Sector of northern Kashmir. He set up an ambush for terrorists and ordered the team to not open the fire before he does. After waiting till terrorists were just meters away, he cornered the infiltrators before attack. He had positioned himself in least cover point and his team behind boulders, before attacking. He shot dead three terrorists when he was wounded in the head from about five meters' distance while trying to pull an injured soldier to safety. He nevertheless killed the fourth terrorist. He managed to pull his comrade-in-arms to safety and kept firing till death.

The encounter lasted about 8 minutes in which 12 well-trained terrorists were killed. His body taken to 92 Base Hospital in Srinagar.

== Ashok Chakra award citation ==
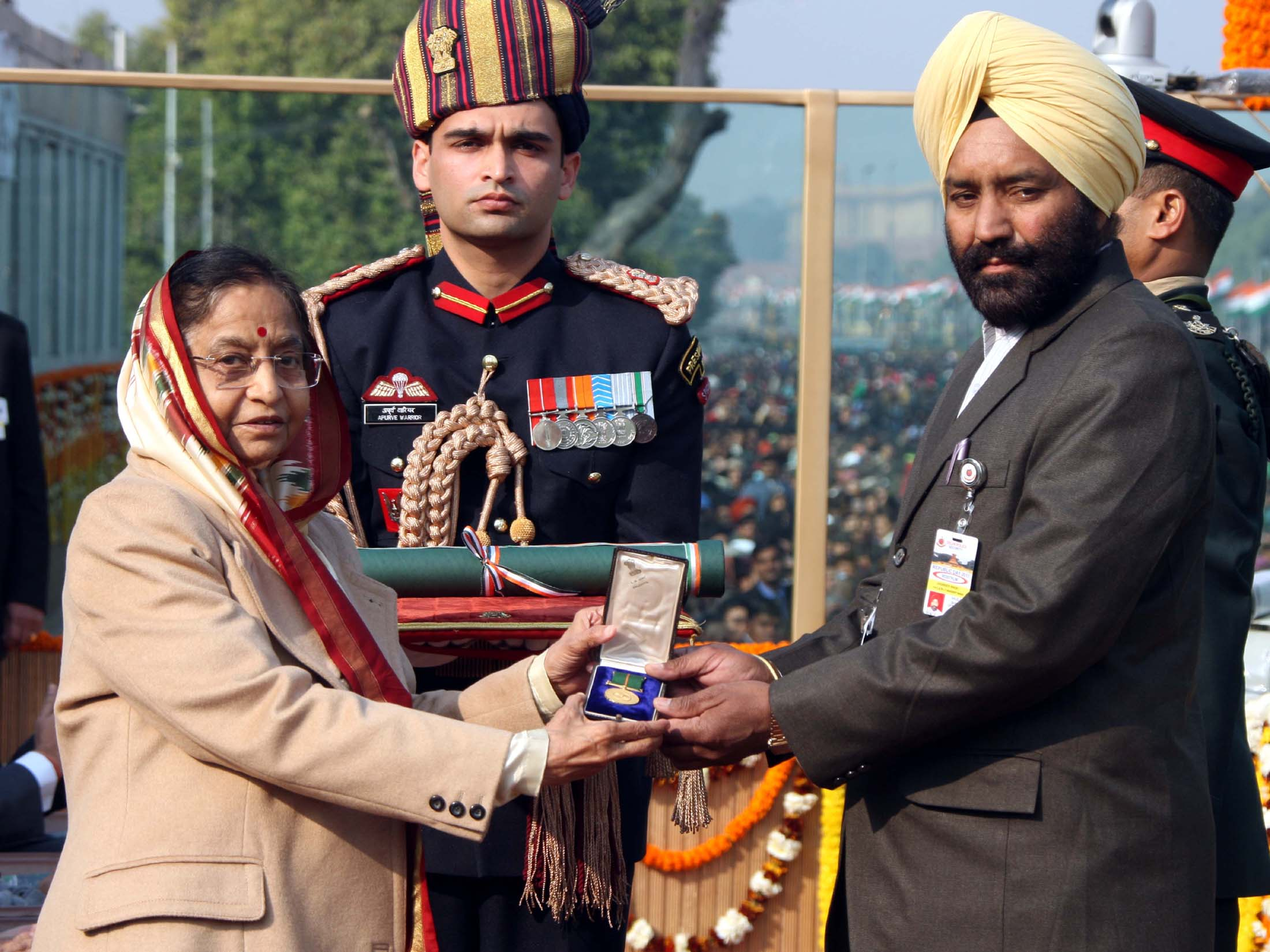
Navdeep Singh's father receives the Ashok Chakra from president Pratibha Patil on 26 January 2012.

Ashoka Chakra

SS-44448A Lieutenant Navdeep Singh

Army Ordnance Corps / 15th Battalion the Maratha Light Infantry (posthumous)

Lieutenant Navdeep Singh was Ghatak Platoon Commander of 15 Maratha Light Infantry deployed in the High Altitude Area near the Line of Control.

On receiving information about the infiltration of a group of terrorists at about 0030 hours on 20 August 2011, the officer gauged the likely route of the terrorists and laid an ambush at the appropriate spot. When the terrorists were spotted, the ambush was sprung by the officer himself. An exchange of intense fire ensued. Leading from the front, the officer eliminated three terrorists at close range. On seeing another terrorist approaching their position, with utter disregard to his personal safety, the officer swiftly changed his firing position. While doing so, he got hit by a bullet on his head. He nevertheless managed to eliminate the fourth terrorist. Further, displaying utmost bravery and comradeship, he pulled an injured fellow soldier to safety and kept firing till he became unconscious due to excessive blood loss.

Lieutenant Navdeep Singh displayed his indomitable spirit, determination, and exceptional bravery while putting down the terrorists and making the supreme sacrifice for the nation.

== Honors ==
Singh's body was brought to his hometown Gurdaspur the next day wrapped in the Indian flag in a military convoy. Mourners included people of his hometown, personnel from civil and army officers and soldiers from his regiment who gave him a guard of honor and the final salute. A state cabinet minister representing the chief minister laid a wreath on his body. He was cremated with full state and army honors amid crowd showering flowers and chanting "Navdeep Singh amar rahe".

He was awarded the Ashoka Chakra posthumously on the 63rd Republic Day by president of India Pratibha Patil.

== In popular culture ==
- India's Most Fearless 2 (2018), book by Shiv Aroor and Rahul Singh, features the true story of fourteen Indian Army’ extraordinary officers. Singh's story is told in the chapter 3, "Fire When You Can See Their Faces".
