= Army Public School, Gorakhpur =

Army Public School, Kunraghat
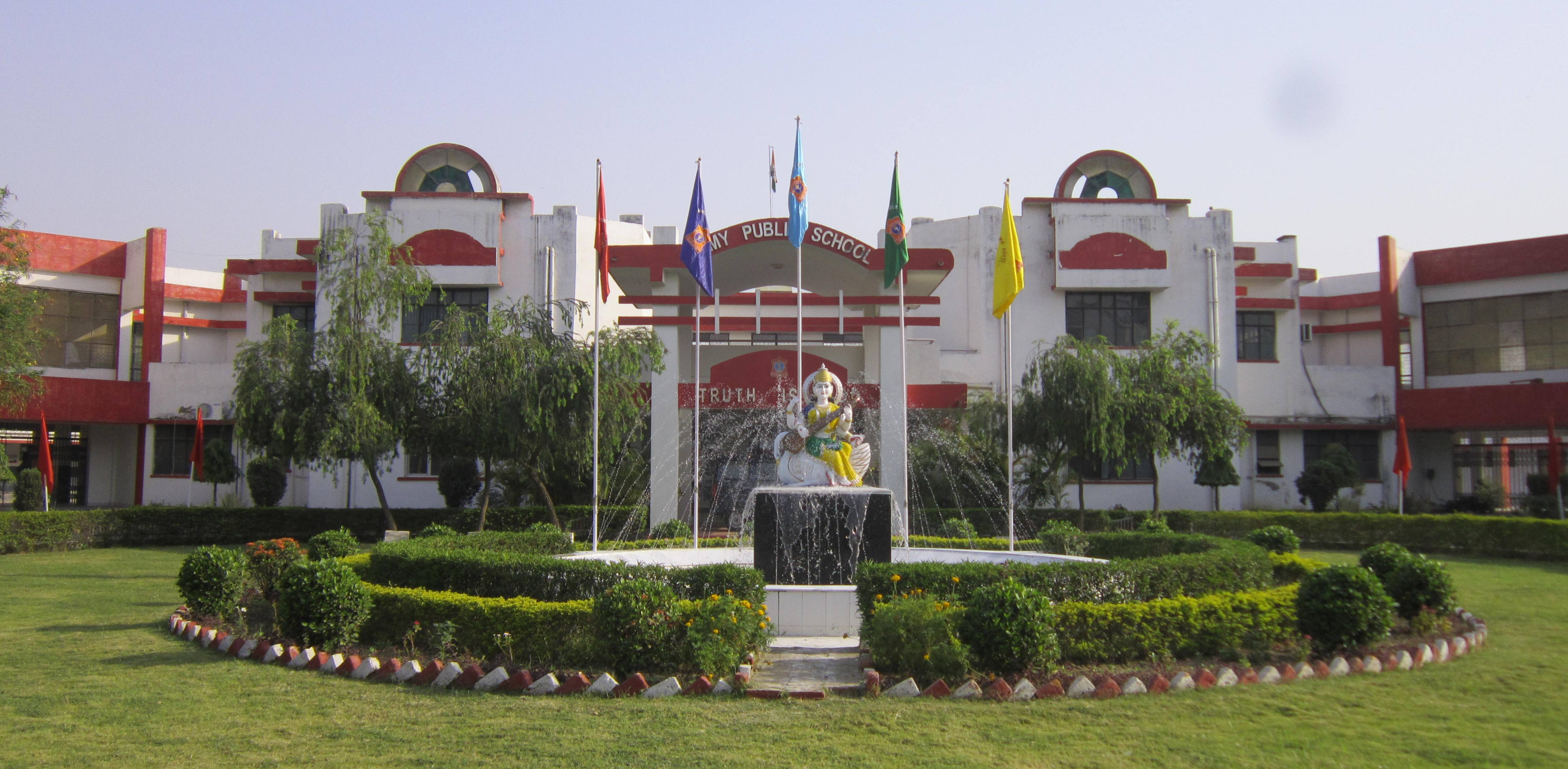
- The School Building

Location
- NH-28; Kunraghat; Gorakhpur, Uttar Pradesh, 273008; India; 26.7483°N 83.4222°E

Information
- Other names: Army School
- Former name: GRD School
- School type: Semi-private, Welfare funded, Co-Ed, Day School
- Motto: Truth Is God
- Religious affiliations: Secular (de jure); Agnostic Hindu (de facto)
- Patron saints: GOC, Central Command
- Established: 1954 (1994 reestablished)
- Founder: Neena Thapa
- Status: Open
- School board: CBSE
- School district: Gorakhpur District
- Trust: Army Welfare Education Society
- Chairman: Commandant GRD, Kunraghat
- Governing body: III Gorkha Rifles
- Officer in charge: SO, GRD Kunraghat
- Teaching staff: 85
- Enrollment: 2,208 students
- Classes: 1 - 12
- Average class size: 35
- Language: English (official); Hindi
- Campus size: 11.01 acres (4.46 ha)
- Campus type: Suburban
- Houses: Dhan Singh Thapa; Manekshaw; Manoj Pandey; Salaria
- Colors: Burgundy, White and Steel Gray
- Yearbook: Excelsior
- School fees: ₹30,155 (US$310) to ₹80,570 (US$840) per annum (varies with class and criteria)
- Affiliation: Central Board of Secondary Education
- Identification symbol
- Website: https://www.apsgorakhpur.org.in

Army Public School, Kunraghat, Gorakhpur is a school located in the Kunraghat area, in Gorakhpur, India. It is operated under Indian Army supervision under the aegis of the Army Welfare Education Society. The school was founded in 1954 by Neena Thapa, wife of Colonel Gopal Kushal Singh Thapa, then Commandant GRD, Kunraghat. On 1 April 1994 it was re-designated as "Army School, Kunraghat" after the dissolution of the existing Gorkha Recruiting Depot (GRD) High School and the absorption of its students. The premises and assets of GRD High School in situ were transferred to Army School, Kunraghat. Most of the students in this school are from Army Background.
