= War Widows Association of Great Britain =

Advocacy group for widows of British military personnel

War Widows’ Association of Great Britain is an advocacy group for widows and widowers of British military personnel killed in action or from injuries attributable to their Service. It was founded in 1971 to persuade the British government to make the widows' pension tax-free, a goal which it finally obtained in 1979. It operates through the 3 pillars of the organisation: Campaigning, Caring and Remembering. It represents war widows at remembrance ceremonies. The association holds an Annual Service of Remembrance at The Cenotaph, Whitehall, on the day before Remembrance Sunday.

In the 2003 New Year Honours, Mary Brailsford of Chesterfield, Derbyshire was awarded an MBE (Member of the Order of the British Empire) "for services to the War Widows Association of Great Britain".

One of the group's founders was Kathleen Woodside from Liverpool. Her husband Charles was killed in Italy on 1 March 1945.
