= Article 12 of the Constitution of India =

Article 12 of the Indian Constitution defines the concept of "state" in Indian Polity and laws. This article is only applicable to Part III (Fundamental Rights) and Part IV (Directive Principles of State Policy). The original text says,

In this Part, unless the context otherwise requires, “the State’’ includes the Government and Parliament of India and the Government and the Legislature of each of the States and all local or other authorities within the territory of India or under the control of the Government of India.

— Article 12 of Indian Constitution

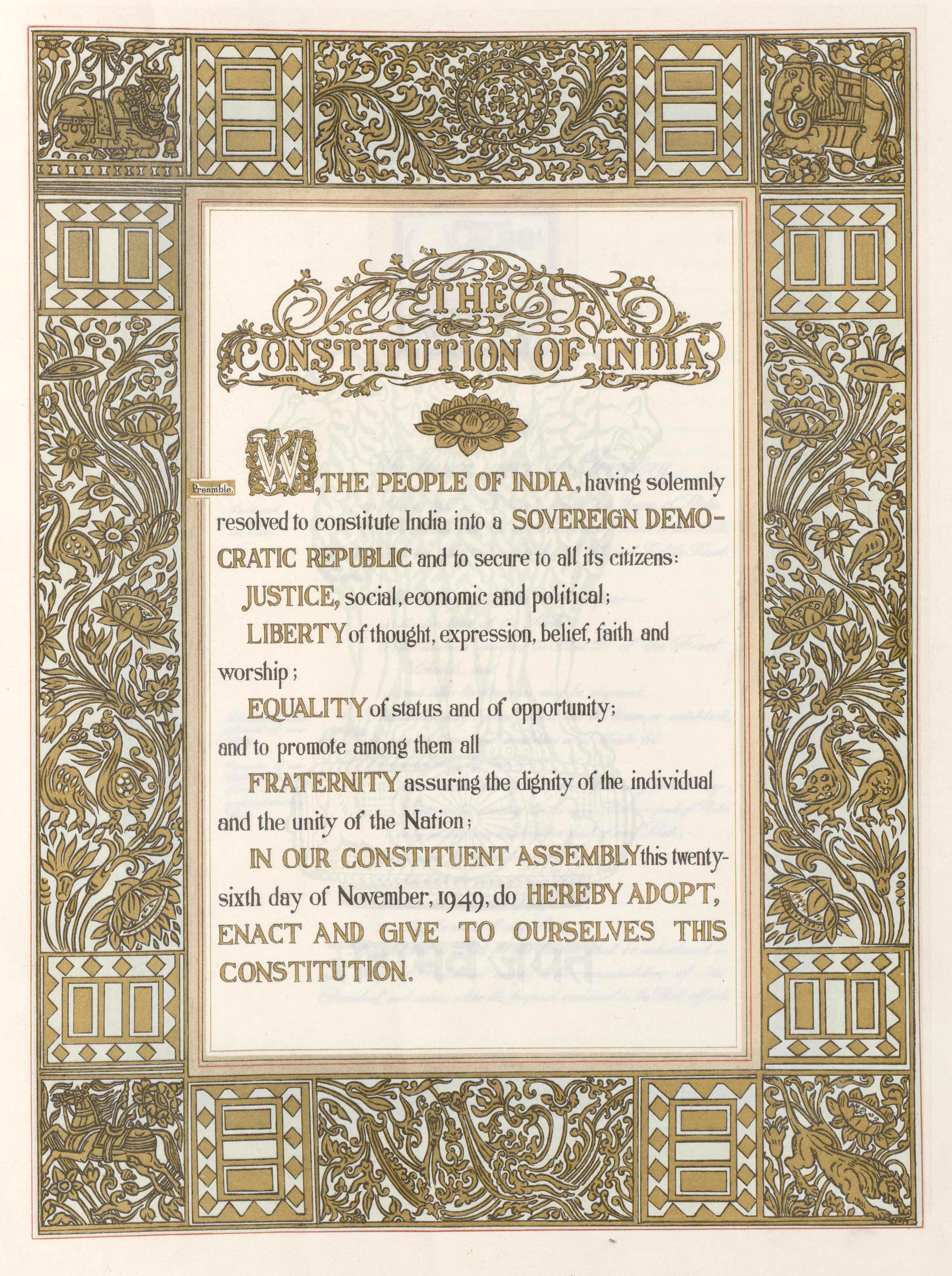
Preamble of Constitution

The definition is crucial because the Fundamental Rights as guaranteed in Part III of the Constitution (Articles 12 to 35) are primarily claims against "The State" and protect citizens from arbitrary actions by the government. If someone claims that their Fundamental Rights have been violated, the entity violating them must fall under the definition of "The State" as per Article 12. The Article 13, clause 2 of Indian constitution uses the definition of state under Article 12 to provide the judiciary the power of judicial review. The main contention around Article 12 has been regarding the words in the clause, "Other authorities" several High Court and Supreme Court Rulings have clarified the position over years.

== Court cases ==
=== University of Madras v. Santa Bai (1954) ===
In this case, the Madras High Court applied the legal doctrine of ejusdem generis (of the same kind/nature). The court ruled that "other authorities" must refer only to authorities of the same nature as those explicitly listed in Article 12 (government, parliament, legislatures). Therefore, universities or bodies not performing sovereign functions were not considered "The State."

=== Rajasthan State Electricity Board (RSEB) v. Mohan Lal (1967) ===
The Supreme Court rejected the ejusdem generis rule applied in Santa Bai. The Court ruled that the expression "other authorities" is wide enough to include all bodies created by a statute (law) on which powers are conferred, regardless of whether they perform sovereign functions or commercial activities.

=== Sukhdev Singh v. Bhagatram (1975) ===
The Supreme Court further expanded the scope by explicitly ruling that massive statutory corporations like the Life Insurance Corporation (LIC), Oil and Natural Gas Commission (ONGC), and the Industrial Finance Corporation (IFC) fall under the definition of "State." The Court noted that these bodies had the power to make binding rules and regulations for their employees, acting as arms of the government.

=== Ramana Dayaram Shetty v. International Airport Authority of India (1979) ===
Justice P. N. Bhagwati laid down the "Instrumentality or Agency" test. The Court held that if a body is an agency or instrumentality of the government, it is a "State," even if it is just a registered society or a government company. Instrumentality test is laid down as follows:

- State is the chief provider of Capital or funding source
- There is deep and pervasive control of the State.
- Its functions have public importance or are of a governmental character.
- A department of Government transferred to a corporation
- Enjoys monopoly status which State conferred or is protected by it.

The Instrumentality test is only illustrative in nature as laid down in this case.

=== BCCI Case ===
The Supreme Court had to decide if the Board of Control for Cricket in India (BCCI) was a "State." Despite BCCI having a monopoly over cricket in India and selecting the national team, the Court ruled that BCCI is not a "State" under Article 12. It is an autonomous body, not financially dependent on the government, and not subjected to "deep and pervasive" government control. However, because BCCI performs public duties (selecting the national team), the Court ruled it is amenable to writ jurisdiction under Article 226 (High Courts), but citizens cannot file a writ directly in the Supreme Court under Article 32 for Fundamental Right violations against it.

=== Kaushal Kishor vs The State Of Uttar Pradesh Govt. Of U.P. (2023) ===
Supreme Court ruled that Article 19 (Freedom of Speech, etc.) and Article 21 (Right to Life and Personal Liberty) can be enforced against persons other than the "State" or its instrumentalities, meaning private corporations and individuals can also be sued for violating article 19 and article 21.
