= Army Public School, Pune =

Coordinates: 18°31′8.71″N 73°53′32.32″E

Army Public School
- APS Pune
- The school crest
- Pune Cantonment; Pune, Maharashtra; India

Information
- Motto: Truth Is God
- Established: 1988
- School board: CBSE
- Principal: Mrs.Anita Karwal
- Grades: 1- 12
- Song: Hamari Shaan Hai, Hamari Jaan Hai
- Website: www.apspune.com

Army Public School is a school in Pune, Maharashtra, India. Its main entrance is in Ghorpadi Market, opposite Bank of Maharashtra in Ghorpadi in Pune Cantonment. Mrs. Anita Sharma is the current principal of the school.

== History ==
The school was founded in June 1988 in Dighi, a suburb of Pune. It was shifted to Vishwamitra Marg in Pune cantonment near the racecourse in April 1997. The school moved to its current site in Ghorpadi in 2015, which in Pune Camp earlier .

It is divided into two wings:

- Junior Wing (Classes I to V )
- Senior Wing (Classes VI to XII).

It is near the residential complex of Ghorpadi lines, Ghorpadi market and Ghorpadi railway station, apart from some army sub-area establishments.

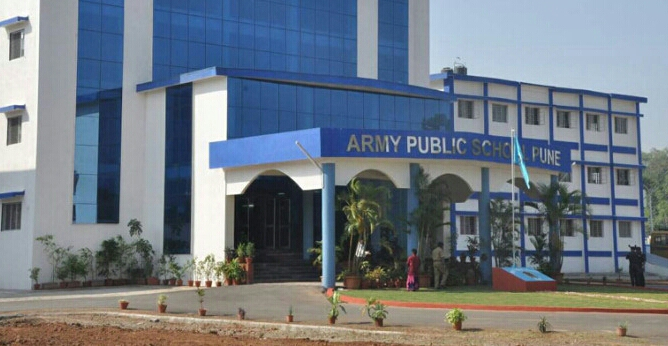
School building in Ghorpadi

The school is controlled by the Army Welfare Education Society (AWES). It follows the CBSE Board of Education in India. The school has three science laboratories, one biotechnology lab and one mathematics lab, two libraries, three computer laboratories, three music rooms (one for Indian music, the other for western music), an art room, three audiovisual rooms and a computer room for teacher training.

The school has a spacious auditorium, a library, a basketball court, a football field, three volleyball courts, a cricket pitch and table tennis facilities. The school has two choirs and is prominent in quizzing events in the Pune city.

The school publishes a monthly newsletter, "Creativity.com," which highlights all school activities, and a yearly magazine compiled by its editorial board, "Images," where student and teacher contributions are published. The school conducts workshops for its students. Students in higher grades are given career guidance and informed about various career choices.

== Houses ==
The students in the school are divided into four houses:

House
Thimaya
Carriapa
Manekhshaw
Bhagat

The school authorities changed the house names in 2015. Earlier they were Pluto z(Bhagat), Neptune (Manekshaw), Saturn (Carriapa) and Jupiter (Thimaya). This was done before the school campus was shifted to its current location in Ghorpadi, Pune.

== See also ==
- Army Public School
- List of schools in Pune
