= Army Public School, Binnaguri =

Army Public School Binnaguri

Location
- Binnaguri; Jalpaiguri, West Bengal, 735232; India; 26°45′18.84″N 89°04′16.26″E

Information
- Type: Public
- Motto: Truth is God
- Established: 3 June 1993; 33 years ago
- School board: CBSE
- Oversight: Army Welfare Education Society
- Principal: Mrs. Kiran Singh
- Staff: 84
- Faculty: 50+
- Grades: Class 1 – 12
- Enrollment: 1,424
- Houses: Gandhi, Nehru, Shastri, Tagore
- Website: www.apsbinnaguri.org

Army Public School is a public high school in Binnaguri, Jalpaiguri district, West Bengal, India. The school is run by the Army Welfare Education Society (AWES) and is affiliated with the Central Board of Secondary Education. Army Public School educates over 1,400 students in Grades I to XII with Science, Commerce and Humanities streams.

== History ==
The school was founded on 3 June 1993, as a primary school, having classes in Grades I to V. Grades VI-IX were added for 1995–96. In April 1996, the school was upgraded to Grade X. The Senior Secondary level (Grades XI and XII) was added from the academic session 2003–04.

The new building was inaugurated, in April 2007, by Lt. Gen. CKS Sabu.

== Houses ==
There are four houses:

- Gandhi (Yellow)
- Nehru (Red)
- Shastri (Green)
- Tagore (Blue)

== Facilities ==
The school has a range of facilities:

- Two basketball courts
- Physics, Chemistry, Biology labs
- One football ground
- One hockey ground
- Two badminton courts
- Two volleyball courts
- Auditorium
- Library
- Two computer labs
- Music room
- Science Park
- Herbal garden
- Junior playground
- Smart Class Facility

== Streams after Grade X ==
Commerce	Science	Humanities
English	English	English
Accountancy	Physics	Geography
Business Studies	Chemistry	History
Economics	Biology/Computer Science	Economics/Political Science
Hindi/Informatics Practices/Maths/Painting	Hindi/Informatics Practices/Maths/Painting	Hindi/Informatics Practices/Maths/Painting
Physical Education	Physical Education	Physical Education
