= Army Institute of Technology =

Engineering college in Maharashtra, India

Army Institute of Technology (AIT)
- AIT, Pune logo
- Motto: Onward To Glory
- Type: Graduate
- Established: 1994
- Affiliations: University of Pune; NBA; NAAC
- Principal: B. P. Patil
- Director: Maj Gen Uday Shankar Sengupta (Retd)
- Students: 1,288
- Undergraduates: 1,274
- Postgraduates: 14
- Location: Pune, Maharashtra, India; 18°37′5.76″N 73°52′36.34″E
- Campus: Urban 30 acre
- Colors: Maroon and yellow
- Website: www.aitpune.com

Army Institute of Technology is an engineering college located in Pune, Maharashtra, India. It is affiliated to the Savitribai Phule Pune University. Only wards of army personnel are admitted in this institute. AIT is operated by the Army Welfare Education Society (AWES) and has the Chief of Army Staff of the Indian Army (COAS), as the president of its board of governors.

== Governance ==
AIT has a one-tier governance structure. At the highest level is the Board of Governors with the COAS as president, and the VCOAS and all Army Commanders (except the General Officer Commanding-in-Chief, South Western Command) as Vice Presidents. The managing director of AWES is designated as the Member Secretary, with the following officers being Members: DCOAS (IS & T), DCOAS (P & S), Adjutant General (AG), Quartermaster General (QMG), Master General Ordnance (MGO), Military secretary (MS), Engineer-in-Chief, three Heads of Arms/Services in rotation, Director General (Discipline, Ceremonials & Welfare) and the Judge Advocate General (JAG). This is followed by a twelve-member Governing Body, which includes nominees from AICTE, the University of Pune and the Government of Maharashtra, and a ten-member Local Managing Committee, which includes representatives from each of the teaching faculties.

== Rankings ==
University rankings

Engineering – India
- NIRF (2024): 201-300

The National Institutional Ranking Framework (NIRF) ranked the college in 201-300 band in the engineering rankings in 2024.
