= Army Institute of Law =

Law Institute in Punjab, India

- Motto: Aspire and Achieve
- Type: Private Law school
- Established: 1999; 27 years ago
- Parent institution: Army Welfare Education Society
- Affiliations: NAAC, BCI
- Academic affiliations: Punjabi University
- Chairman: Maj. Gen. Goldsmith
- Principal: Tejinder Kaur
- Faculty: 26
- Students: 422
- Undergraduates: 399
- Postgraduates: 15
- Doctoral students: 8
- Location: Mohali, Punjab, India; 30°41′11″N 76°43′15″E
- Campus: Urban
- Website: www.ail.ac.in

Army Institute of Law (AIL) is a private law school in Mohali, Punjab, India. The Institute is affiliated to Punjabi University, Patiala, and is run by the Army Welfare Education Society (AWES). The Institute has a moderately sized campus in Sector 68, Mohali. The Hostels can accommodate 400 students.

== History ==
Army Institute of law was established in 1999, by the Indian Army under the Army Welfare Education Society. In July 2003, the campus shifted to Sector 68, Mohali. On 1 December 2003, the Mohali Campus was inaugurated by H.E. Dr. APJ Abdul Kalam, the then President of India. The Institute is affiliated to the Punjabi University, Patiala and approved by the Bar Council of India.

The National Assessment and Accreditation Council have accredited AIL with a grade 'A'. The institution offers 5-year integrated BA LLB programme and a 1-year postgraduate LLM programme with a specialisation in Family Law or Criminal Law. Both the programmes offered by the institution are approved by the Bar Council of India.

== Academics ==
=== Undergraduate ===
AIL offers a 5-year integrated B.A LL.B. program. The Institute reserves 100 seats of the total 75 for wards of Army personnel and 20 are available for civilians. Twenty civilian slots are for students from Punjab and five are for the All-India Civil Category. The college is approved by the Bar Council of India. Admission is based on the Army Institute of Law Entrance Test, except that civilian students from Punjab are selected on the basis of 10+2 marks.

=== Postgraduate ===
AIL offers a one-year postgraduate L.L.M. program with options to specialize in Criminal Law or Family law. The prestigious course enrolls passionate students on the basis of a common entrance examination. The syllabus can be found here.

=== Admission Process ===
==== Undergraduate ====
Army Institute of Law, Mohali conducts AIL LET, also known as the Army Institute of Law Entrance Test for admission to its undergraduate course.

- Admission to 80 seats for wards of army personnel is done through entrance test(Online LET) conducted by ASL under the aegis of AWES.
- Admission to 04 seats in the All India Category through the same entrance test.
- Candidates for both Army and All India Category are called for counselling as per merit in the written exam. Admission is granted only if the candidate is found eligible on the day of counselling.
- Admission to 26 seats in the Punjab Category is based on 10+2 merits, drawn up by the nominated university as per the notification issued by Govt. of Punjab.

=== Fees & Eligibility ===
Course	Fees	Eligibility
B.A L.L.B	₹2.10 Lakh	10+2
L.L.M	₹1.55 Lakh (Total Fees)	L.L.B.

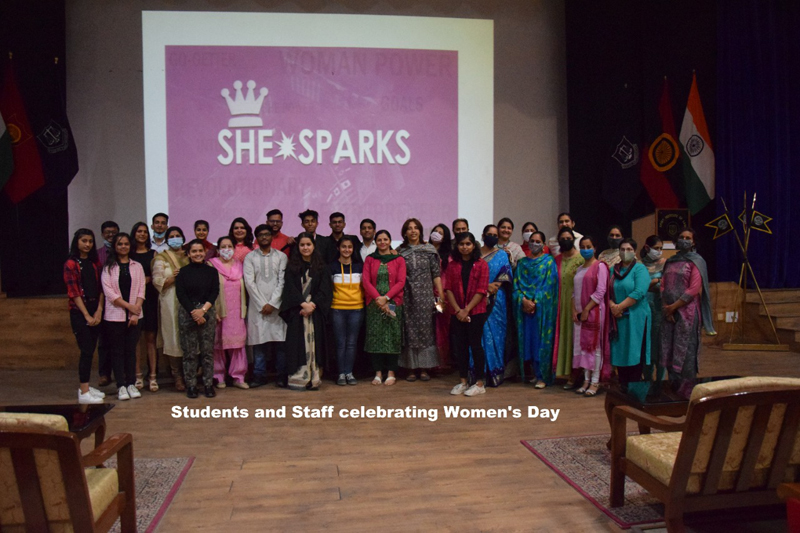
INTERNATIONAL WOMEN’S DAY CELEBRATIONS AT ARMY INSTITUTE OF LAW, MOHALI

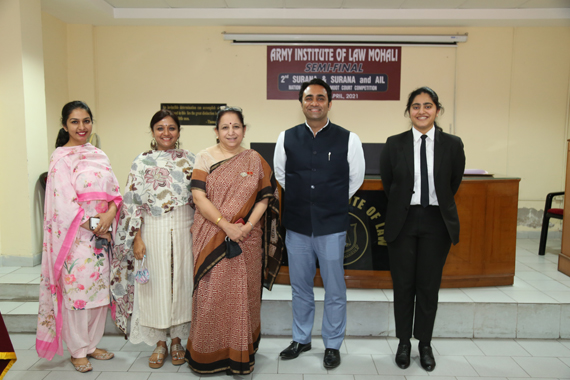
2nd Surana & Surana and AIL National Family Law Moot Court Competition 2021

== Scholarship ==
ASL offers the following scholarships to the students:

- Tata Memorial Scholarship is offered to up to eight wards of Army personnel on securing first or second position in four consecutive years.
- Abhimanyu Scholarship of INR to the topper of AIL Law Entrance Test.
- Angad Singh Dhindsa Scholarship to a female student who secures the highest marks in the first three years of 5-year BA LLB integrated programme.

The students of ASL are also eligible for the following industry-sponsored scholarships:

- A scholarship is awarded to the toppers of Economics and Jurisprudence jointly by the State Bank of India.
- PNB Housing Finance Ltd. awards nine merit-cum-means scholarships, which is divided equally among the deserving students.
- Bajaj Allianz offers a scholarship to the toppers of Law Evidence and Law of Torts.

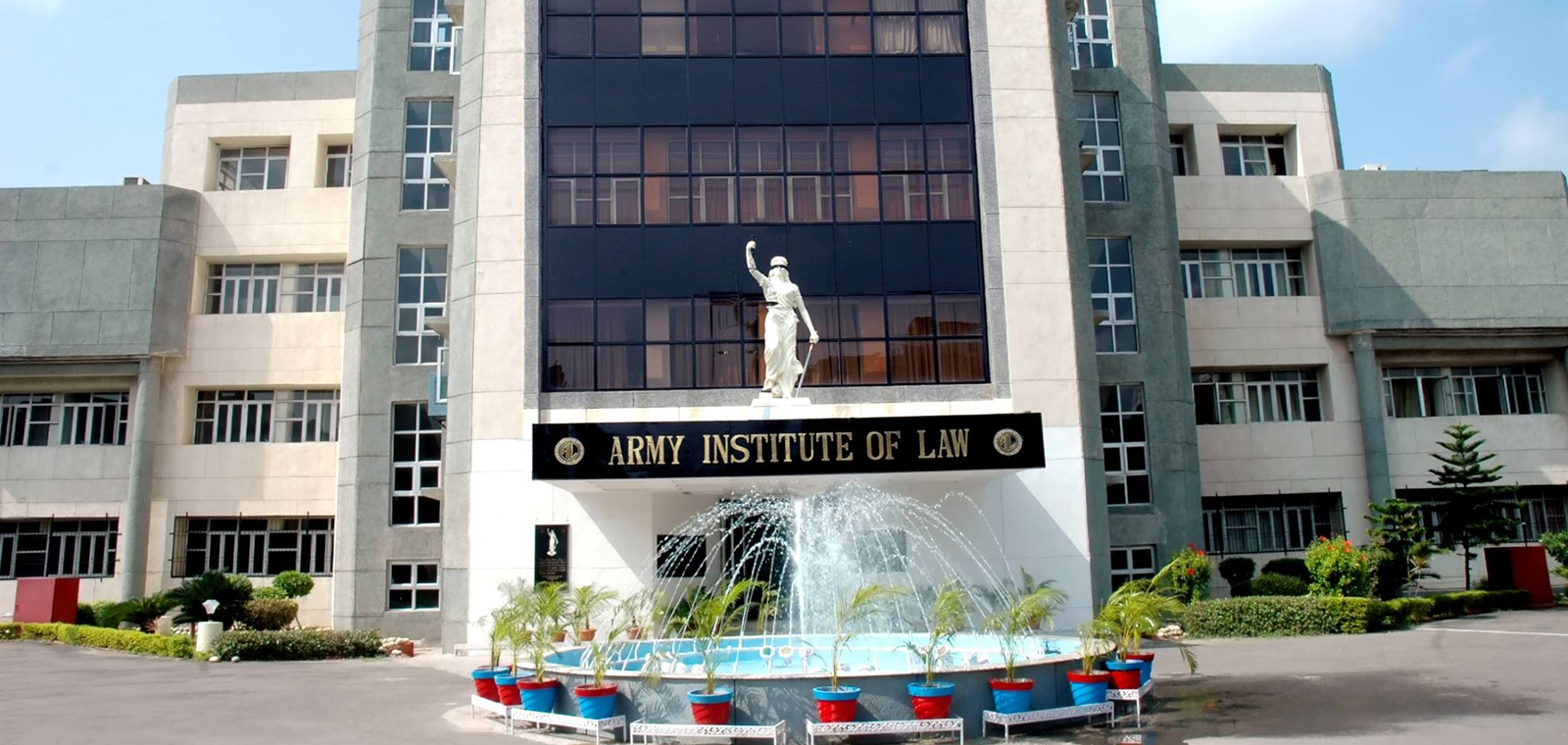
AIL Campus Building

== Research ==
- Centre for Research in Corporate Law & Governance (CRCLG) : Centre for research in Corporate Law & Governance (CRCLG), to promote interdisciplinary research in the field of corporate law.
- AIL, Centre for Research in Social Sciences (ACRSS) : The Army Institute of Law, Centre for Research in Social Sciences facilitating academic research across multiple disciplines.
- Centre for Research in Constitutional Law and Policy (CRCLP) : to provide students a program research on constitutional law and policy matters.
- AIL Centre For Gender Empowerment (ACGE) : to promote awareness about women's issues.

== About the Institute ==
- The Institute is established under the aegis of the Army Welfare Education Society (AWES) and functions under the patronage of Headquarters Western Command, Chandimandir.
- There is a three tier hierarchy for the governance of the Institute: GOC-In-C, HQ Western Command, Patron-in-Chief, AIL; COS HQ Western Command & Patron, AIL; and MG AOC, HQ Western Command & Chairman, AIL.
- At the Institute level, there is Principal, Registrar, Placement Officer, teaching and non-teaching staff.
