= Army Public School, Chennai =

Army Public School
- APS
- Tamil Nadu; Chennai; India

Information
- Motto: "Truth is God"
- Established: May 2009
- School board: CBSE
- Nickname: APSC
- Website: Official Website

The Army Public School, Chennai (APSC) is a public school located in Chennai, India. It is operated under Indian Army supervision under the aegis of Indian Army welfare Education society (AWES). It is the flagship school of the chain of Indian Army Public Schools.

== History ==
It was founded in May 2009 as Golden Palm Army school and inaugurated by Maj. Gen. E J Kochekkan and started with 300 students and 15 teachers. On 1 April 2010 the school got its present name, Army Public School and joined Indian Army Public Schools as its 127th member. From a small beginning of 21 children, the number of students in the school has gradually increased from 300 in 2009 to nearly 1175 in the year 2016.

== See also ==
- Army Public Schools
