= Army Women's Welfare Association =

Indian non-profit organisation

- Abbreviation: AWWA
- Established: August 23, 1966; 59 years ago
- Type: Nonprofit
- President: Komal Seth
- Vice President: Punita Jain
- Parent organization: Indian Army
- Website: awwa.org.in
- Formerly called: Army Wives Welfare Association

The Army Women's Welfare Association (AWWA) is an Indian non-profit organisation that works for the welfare of veer naris (war widows), widows, spouses, children of serving and retired soldiers of the Indian Army and children with special needs (CwSN). It was formerly known as Army Wives Welfare Organisation and took its current name in April 2025.

Mrs Komal Seth, spouse of General Dhiraj Seth is currently serving as president of AWWA, having assumed the role 30 June 2026.

== History ==
The Army Women's Welfare Association emerged in the aftermath of the 1965 Indo-Pakistani War. The initiative was spearheaded by Mrs Rama Chaudhuri, wife of General J. N. Chaudhuri, then Chief of Army Staff, who formally launched the association on 1 July 1966. AWWA came into existence on 23 August 1966 when it was officially registered as a Welfare Society with the Registration of Societies Act 1860, Delhi.

== Role and impact ==
AWWA primarily focuses on providing immediate solace, financial aid, and emotional support to soldiers' families, complementing official military welfare by leveraging the network of army spouses across cantonments.

AWWA runs vocational training centres at military stations across India, offering courses in computer education, language training, tailoring, beauty and wellness, nursery teacher training, driving, candle and paper bag making, handicrafts, and home-based agricultural activities such as beekeeping and mushroom cultivation. In 2016, it established the Army Skill Training Centre (ASTC) in collaboration with the National Skill Development Corporation (NSDC) under the Pradhan Mantri Kaushal Vikas Yojana (PMKVY) to provide certified vocational training and improve the employability of Army spouses, wards and Veer Naris. The association also operates the Parishram AWWA Cell, established in 1996, which manufactures clothing and textile products while providing employment opportunities to veer naris and economically disadvantaged Army families. In addition, AWWA manages retail outlets including Grihasti, Jhanvi, Nutan Pankhuri, Aarohi, Sajni and Smarika, which market products made by Army families and support welfare activities.

AWWA provides ex-gratia to the family of the deceased soldier, educational scholarship to the children of widows of ex-servicemen and distress grants during both natural calamities and economic penury. The details of grants are given in succeeding paras. A onetime grant of Rs 15000/- is given as a token of immediate financial relief from AWWA to the next of kin of all ranks of the Army who die in harness. This amount is given by the unit/formation/institution/establishment immediately on demise of a soldier and reimbursed by AWWA subsequently.

During the COVID-19 pandemic, AWWA handed over 3500 food packets to the Government of National Capital Territory of Delhi for distribution to the people in need. The food packets were prepared under Army's AWWA Lunch project by families of Officers, Junior Commissioned Officers and Other Ranks at their houses in various colonies of Delhi.

== Ventures and welfare initiatives ==
The association operates welfare ventures and initiatives aimed at supporting veer naris and wives of soldiers. In 2005, AAHWAN and AWAA Lunch Project were launched. AAHWAN aimed at providing a platform to market handicrafts and other products. The AWWA Lunch Project provide luch meals to the personnel at Army Headquarters, New Delhi while generating employment for the Veer Naris. On 11 October 2017, Sena Jal project was inaugurated by then president AWWA, Mrs Madhulika Rawat at Delhi Cantt.

Its welfare initiatives include Garbh Sanskar for maternal well-being, ECHS – Sewa or Samman to assist veterans at ECHS polyclinics, Prerna for emotional support to cancer patients and caregivers, Veer Nari Welfare, patient welfare committees at military hospitals, Pratyasha for assisted reproductive technology (ART) patients, the ARSH Clinic for adolescent reproductive and sexual health, Little Angels Child Care Centre, the Eco System Management Committee (ESMC), entrepreneurship and skill-development programmes, Field Area Family Accommodation (FAFA) support and Veerangna Sewa Kendra (VSK) for welfare and grievance redressal of veterans and widows.

=== Prerna ===
Prerna, a cancer support group initiative was launched in November 2002 under the aegis of AWWA at the Army Research and Referral Hospital. It is giving a valuable emotional support and guidance to cancer patients members/volunteers at Prerna work along with the medical and para medical staff to provide patients with care and help them develop confidence.

=== ASHA Schools ===
ASHA Schools started in the year 1991 and at present as of 2026, there are 37 ASHA schools for the differently abled children being run by AWWA, which helps and supports in functioning of these schools. Every year, the ASHA school children make paintings on various themes, these are then selected and printed as greeting cards. The proceeds from the sale of these cards are utilised for the education and better management of ASHA schools.

=== ASHA Kiran ===
ASHA Kiran is a unique pilot project for Inclusive Education and Early Intervention was launched by AWWA under the aegis of HQ Delhi Area at Delhi Area Primary School on 21 August 2018.The initiative aims to provide a common platform so that all children become equal partners in learning process. In order to truly achieve inclusion, the school places every child with special needs in regular classrooms. The special educators, therapists and teachers work together to address the needs of each child and an “Individualized Education Program” is designed which is a detailed plan enlisting long-term goals and short-term objectives. Asha Kiran addresses a wide spectrum of disabilities like Autism Spectrum Disorders, Mental Retardation, Cerebral Palsy, Muscular Dystrophy, Speech Language and Communication disorders, Hearing Impairment, Learning Disability, Down Syndrome, Attention Deficit Hyperactive Disorder etc. by providing various therapeutic programs including counseling, special education, speech therapy and occupational therapy.

=== Project Vishwas ===
In order to promote self reliance for the children of Asha School, above 18 years of age, Project Vishwas was launched and registered on 3 May 2017 under the Societies Registration Act of 1860. Presently 37 children (22 at Delhi, 6 at Bhatinda and 9 at Chandimandir) are undergoing training Pan India. Many household and daily use products are being produced by Vishwas and sold in AWWA outlets. The profits are utilized to provide a monthly stipend to students since April 2017.

=== AWWA Hostels ===
AWWA Hostels provides secure residential hostels in metropolitan cities for boys and girls pursuing higher education. AWWA makes contributions for the construction of hostels whenever required. These hostels provide facilities of security, home made food, transport, recreational activities like gymnasium, internet, library, etc. to the hostel wards. "Home Away from Home" is the motto of these hostels.

== Organisational structure ==
The Army Women's Welfare Association is headed by a president, who is the spouse of the Chief of Army Staff of the Indian Army. President AWWA is supported by Vice President AWWA, who is spouse of the Vice Chief of Army Staff. The central executive committee consists of president, vice president, general secretary, secretary, assistant secretary, treasurer, senior coordinator and a director. The central executive committee oversees functioning, policy implementation and coordination across the country.

The association has seven regional AWWAs corresponding to the Indian Army's seven commands. Each regional AWWA is typically headed by spouse of Army commander. At the corps level, there are zonal AWWAs.

== Awards ==
AWWA has been awarded the Mahatma Award in 2024 for its contributions to social welfare and women empowerment. In 2025, it received the "Sant Eshwer Vishist Sewa Samman" in recognition of the commitment and impact in women and child development.

== See also ==
- War Widows Association, New Delhi
