= 41 Field Regiment (India) =

41 Field Regiment (Kargil)
- Active: 1940 – ?, 1948 – present
- Allegiance: British India; India
- Branch: British Indian Army; Indian Army
- Type: Artillery
- Size: Regiment
- Nicknames: The Pathfinders; Rajaon Ki Palton
- Mottos: Sarvatra, Izzat-O-Iqbal (Everywhere with Honour and Glory)
- Colors: Red & Navy Blue
- Anniversaries: 15 July – Raising Day
- Battle honours: Kargil

Insignia
- Abbreviation: 41 Fd Regt

41 Field Regiment is part of the Regiment of Artillery of the Indian Army.

== Formation and history ==
The regiment was initially raised in 1940 as part of the Royal Indian Artillery (RIA) as 14th Heavy Anti-Aircraft Regiment. It was subsequently designated 3rd Indian Medium Regiment and finally as 41 Medium Regiment. It was later re-raised on 15 July 1948 by Lieutenant Colonel Kalyan Singh (of 2nd Indian Field Regiment, RIA) at Jhansi comprising a newly raised Regimental Headquarters and three artillery batteries from the princely states of Bikaner, Gwalior and Patiala. The three batteries are –

=== 83 (Bikaner) Field Battery ===
The Bikaner artillery traces its origins to 1670. During its early years, under Maharaja Anup Singh, it participated in several Mughal campaigns in the Deccan region, including the Siege of Golconda in 1687. It took part in the First Sikh War (1845–46); Second Sikh War (1848–49) and the Mutiny (1857–58) in support of the East India Company. Bikaner Bijey Battery was formed from select pieces of Bikaner artillery in 1906. The name comes from Prince Bijey Singh, the son of General Maharaja Sir Ganga Singh. It was organised as a camel pack battery in 1924 and equipped with breech-loading guns. It was later equipped with BL 2.75-inch mountain guns. The unit was re-organised as a mountain battery in 1941 and equipped with 3.7-inch howitzers and trained at Quetta. During World War II, the battery under command of Major Kishen Singh was moved from Kohat in 1943 to join 25th Mountain Regiment. It proceeded to Arakan to join 7th Indian Infantry Division in the Burma theatre. It saw extensive action in Assam and Burma in 1944 and 1945, and returned to the State in 1946.

=== 84 (Scindia) Field Battery ===
This Battery was raised as 3rd Company Artillery in 1861. It was converted into the 3rd Horse Artillery in 1853 and later in the same year as the 2nd Horse Artillery. In 1898, it was renamed as 'B' Battery Gwalior Horse. The unit was equipped with 15-pounders and re-organised as ‘B’ Battery, Gwalior Horse Artillery. In 1934, it was re-equipped with QF 18-pounder guns. From 1942, it was known as Scindia's Field Battery. Prior to independence, the battery saw action in World War II in the Burma campaign. It was attached to the 1st Indian Field Regiment and fought in the Battle of Meiktila in 1945. The battery saw action in the Kashmir Operations during Indo-Pakistani war of 1947–1948.

=== 85 (Patiala) Field Battery ===
Raised from Faridkot Sappers in 1948, which itself was raised in 1900 in the erstwhile Faridkot State. The sappers saw action in the East African campaign of World War I, Third Anglo-Afghan War and in World War II in the Burma campaign. The guns of the battery were one of the first to see action during the Kashmir Operations in October 1947. Four 3.7-inch howitzers belonging to the Patiala State Forces were flown and deployed near Pattan along the Srinagar – Baramulla road. The guns were taken over by the artillery men attached with 1 Sikh battalion and fired, causing the Pakistani raiders to flee.

== Operations ==
The regiment has taken part in the following operations following its raising–

- Indo-Pakistani War of 1965 – During Operation Riddle, the regiment was part of the 7 Infantry Division sector and took part in the Battle of Burki. The regiment lost one officer and six men during the war.
- Indo-Pakistani War of 1971 –Operation Cactus Lily.
- Operation Bajrang and Operation Rhino – Between 1988 and 1992, the regiment took part in counter terrorism operations in Assam.
- Operation Vijay – The unit was de-inducted from the Kashmir valley along with 8 Mountain Artillery Brigade for Operation Vijay in 1999. It was commanded by Colonel GS Mann and equipped with 105 mm Indian Field Guns. The regiment provided close range, accurate and timely fire support in the Battle of Tololing, Point 5140 from Thasgam, Battle of Point 4700 (Mushkoh), Battle of Point 4875 (now named as Gun Hill), Battle of Zulu Top and gave a decisive blow in the Battle of Tiger Hill from Drass.
- Operation Parakram – 2001
- Operation Snow Leopard

== Gallantry awards ==
The regiment has won the following gallantry awards–

- The regiment was awarded the honour title Kargil for its valour during Operation Vijay.
- Vir Chakra – Major Amrinder Singh Kasana
- Mentioned in dispatches – Major RS Chaudhary, Havildar Ram Lakhan Singh

== Notable Officers ==
- Lieutenant General K Ravi Prasad PVSM, VSM – Colonel Commandant of the Regiment of Artillery. Retired as the Director General Artillery in 2021.

== See also ==
- List of artillery regiments of Indian Army
