= 13 Field Regiment (India) =

13 Field Regiment (Chushul and Gadra City)
- Active: 1945 – present
- Country: India
- Allegiance: British India; India
- Branch: British Indian Army; Indian Army
- Type: Artillery
- Size: Regiment
- Nickname: TERA
- Mottos: Sarvatra, Izzat-O-Iqbal (Everywhere with Honour and Glory); Charh di Kala
- Colors: Red & Navy Blue
- Anniversaries: 1 December – Raising Day
- Battle honours: Chushul; Gadra City

Insignia
- Abbreviation: 13 Fd Regt

13 Field Regiment (Chushul and Gadra City) is part of the Regiment of Artillery of the Indian Army, and has the distinction of having two post-independence honour titles. (Note: The other unit with this distinction is 17 (Parachute) Field Regiment.)

== Formation ==
The regiment was raised as 13 Field Regiment RIA on 1 December 1945. The unit consists of 36, 37 and 38 Field Batteries. Following the partition of India, the unit was allotted to the Indian Army. The regiment was subsequently converted to a medium regiment and is now back as a field regiment.

== Composition ==
The regiment is a single class regiment with Sikh soldiers.

== Operations ==
The regiment has taken part in the following operations–

Indo-Pakistani War of 1947–1948

Following the accession of the state of Kashmir to India on 26 October 1947, Indian troops were airlifted to Srinagar, the state capital. Due to the shortfall of troops in the unit selected for the airlift, three officers and 104 Sikh troops of 13 Field Regiment (from 36 Field Battery) and from 2 Field Regiment (SP) proceeded as a composite company of the 1 Sikh (Now 4 Mech) Battalion. The gunners donned uniforms of 1 Sikh and the composite company was under the command of Captain RL Chauhan of 13 Field Regiment. The first flights of civil and Royal Indian Air Force Dakotas transported them to Srinagar on the morning of 27 October 1947.

C Company of 1 Sikh and the Composite Company, RIA were dispatched immediately on arrival to reinforce the State Forces troops at Baramulla covering the main Uri - Baramulla - Srinagar Axis. The troops from the regiment operated as infantry under 161 Infantry Brigade Group till the first week of November 1947, when four 3.7-inch howitzers of the Patiala State Forces reached the area. Thereafter, the artillery gunners took over the howitzers and assisted the infantry to drive out the infiltrators. The regiment was awarded one Vir Chakra and three Mentioned in Despatches during the war.

Sino-Indian War of 1962

The 13 Field Regiment, which was under the command of Lieutenant Colonel Shri Dhar Man Singh, was stationed in the Kashmir valley at the beginning of hostilities. 38 Field Battery of 13 Field Regiment and a troop from 32 Heavy Mortar Regiment were part of the artillery sent as reinforcement to the Chushul sector in the end of October 1962 and were under the command of 114 Infantry Brigade. Twelve 25-pounder guns were flown from Chandigarh to Chushul, by the An-12s of No. 44 Squadron IAF. By 3 November, one battery reached Dungti and was under 70 Infantry Brigade. The third battery along with the regimental headquarters were located in Leh under 163 Infantry Brigade.

38 Field Battery was under the command of Major SP Joshi. Major Balraj Singh was the second in command (2-IC). The eight-gun battery had two troops, each one with four 25-pounder guns. All the guns were positioned at the base of Gurung Hill and Magar Hill to support both the hill features and the Spanggur Gap. It was the then world's highest gun position at 15,000 feet. During the operations, Second Lieutenant Shyamal Dev Goswami along with Gunner (TA) Gurdip Singh, Naik Pritam Singh and Lance Naik Sarwan Singh were posted to Gurung hill at the observation post (OP) with 1/8 Gorkha Rifles. In the early hours of 18 November 1962, Goswami and his team were assaulted from two fronts by the PLA infantry. Well fired artillery shells inflicted heavy Chinese casualties. A shell and grenade attack severely injured Goswami and killed his men. In the two days of the Battle of Chushul, the battery fired 2710 shells, creating havoc on the Chinese, who were attacking at Gurung Hill, Spanggur gap and Magar Hill. This action frustrated the Chinese attack and considerable slowed their offence. For its valour in holding the enemy and defending Chushul heights, 13 Field Regiment was awarded the honour title Chushul. In addition, Major General Budh Singh, MC presented the unit the Divisional Commanders Banner. Second Lieutenant SD Goswami was awarded the Maha Vir Chakra; Gunner (TA) Gurdip Singh was awarded the Vir Chakra posthumously; Naik Pritam Singh and Lance Naik Sarwan Singh were both were awarded the Sena Medal posthumously.

Indo-Pakistani War of 1965

The regiment was under 26 Infantry Division in the Sialkot sector. The regiment equipped with its 25-pounders were in support of 1 Sikh Light Infantry during its attack on Kundanpur on the night of 7 and 8 September 1965. The unit lost five men during the war.

Indo-Pakistani War of 1971

13 Field Regiment was part of 11 Artillery Brigade under 11 Infantry Division in the Barmer sector during Operation Cactus Lily. During the Battle of Gadra City on the night of 4/5 December 1971, the unit was in direct support of 15 Kumaon of 31 Infantry Brigade. The Forward Observation Officer (FOO) and his radio operator with 15 Kumaon directed the artillery fire with great accuracy causing intense damage to the enemy defences and ensuring a swift capture.

13 Field Regiment (along with 15 Kumaon) were awarded the Battle Honour Gadra City. The commanding officer, Lieutenant Colonel Ashok Gilani was awarded the Vishisht Seva Medal for coordinating the excellent fire support along widely separated axes. Naib Subedar Ranjit Singh of the regiment was awarded the Vishisht Seva Medal, for ensuring that the guns of the regiment were never stuck in the desert sand and always available despite the terrain, especially during the attach on Dali and Pirani Ka Par. The FOO, Captain Leslie Nibblet and the radio operator, Amolak Singh were mentioned in despatches.

Other operations

The regiment has taken part in counter-terrorism operations in Jammu and Kashmir and in Assam.

== Gallantry awards ==
The regiment has won the following gallantry awards –

- Maha Vir Chakra – 1
  - 1962 operations – 1 (Second Lieutenant Shyamal Dev Goswami)
- Vir Chakra – 2
  - 1947 operations – 1
  - 1962 operations – 1 (Gunner (TA) Gurdip Singh)
- Sena Medal – 6
  - 1962 operations – 2 (Naik Pritam Singh and Lance Naik Sarwan Singh (both posthumous))
  - 1997 operations in Assam – 4 (Major Parminder Pal Singh Sidhu, BHM Gurmail Singh, Naik Kishan Singh, Lance Naik Lakhvir Singh (all posthumous))
- Vishisht Seva Medal – 2
  - 1971 operations – 2 (Lieutenant Colonel Ashok Gillani, Naib Subedar Ranjit Singh)
- Mentioned in dispatches
  - 1947 operations – 2 (Captain Dewak Ram, Lance Naik Sawaran Singh, OWA Harbans Singh)
  - 1971 operations – 2 (Captain Leslie Niblett, Gunner (ORA) Amolak Singh)
- COAS Commendation Cards
  - RHM Mandeep Singh

== Motto ==
The motto of the regiment is Charh di Kala (चारदी कला, Gurmukhi: ਚੜ੍ਹਦੀ ਕਲਾ), which loosely translates to Always in the Ascendant.

== See also ==
- List of artillery regiments of Indian Army
