= Prithipal Singh Gill =

Indian military officer (1920–2021)

Colonel Prithipal Singh Gill
- Photograph of Colonel Prithipal Singh Gill during his time in service with the Indian Navy
- Born: 11 December 1920; Patiala State, British Raj (now in Punjab, India)
- Died: 5 December 2021 (aged 100); Chandigarh, India
- Military career
- Allegiance: British India; India
- Branch: Royal Indian Air Force; Royal Indian Navy; Indian Army
- Service years: 1942–1948; 1951–1970
- Rank: Pilot Officer (Indian Air Force); Lieutenant (Royal Indian Navy); Colonel (Indian Army)
- Service number: IC-5571
- Units: 34 Field Regiment (Cassino-II); HMIS Tir
- Commands: 71 Medium Regiment
- Conflicts: Second World War; Indo-Pakistani War of 1965; Insurgency in Northeast India

Colonel Prithipal Singh Gill (11 December 1920 – 5 December 2021) was an Indian military officer and centenarian known for being the only soldier in the Indian Armed Forces to have served in all three of its branches.

== Career ==
Born in Patiala State on 11 December 1920 to Lieutenant Colonel (then Captain) Harpal Singh Gill of the Patiala Lancers, Gill studied at Government College Lahore. A passionate flyer, he earned a flying licence at Walton Airport in Lahore, and in 1942, without informing his family, joined the Indian Air Force. Commissioned a pilot officer, Gill was training on Harvard aircraft at Karachi when his father arranged for his transfer from the IAF as the family considered flying unsafe.

Gill transferred to the Royal Indian Navy, and was commissioned a temporary Sub-Lieutenant in the gunnery branch of the Royal Indian Naval Volunteer Reserve (RINVR) on 25 January 1943. For the remainder of the Second World War, Gill served on minesweepers and escort vessels, serving on convoy duties protecting shipping in the Persian Gulf. He was subsequently sent to attend the Long Gunnery Staff Course at the Army School of Artillery in Deolali, qualifying as an instructor. He ended his naval service in September 1948, and briefly served as a civil servant in the Punjab Government.

In April 1951, Gill joined the Indian Army. Though he had initially hoped for assignment to his father's former battalion, the 1st Sikh Regiment, he was instead posted to the Regiment of Artillery due to his prior experience with gunnery. His initial posting was with the Gwalior Mountain Battery, equipped with 5.4 inch guns. Gill later served with 34 Field Regiment and was promoted to Major on 13 May 1956.

Promoted to Lieutenant-Colonel on 2 August 1962, Gill commanded 71 Medium Regiment during the Indo-Pakistan War of 1965. Seeing action in the Sialkot sector, during a battle he personally led a mission to retrieve four of his guns which had been cut off by the enemy. He was promoted to Colonel on 19 June 1968 (seniority from 24 May), and was appointed a sector commander in the Assam Rifles, stationed at Ukhrul in Manipur. He took early retirement from the army, relinquishing his commission on 1 December 1970.

== Personal life ==
Gill married his wife Preminder Kaur (born 1927) on 24 December 1950. He died on 5 December 2021, at age 100 in his home in Chandigarh.
