= 1 Field Regiment (India) =

Indian military unit

- Active: 1935 – present
- Country: India
- Allegiance: British India; India
- Branch: British Indian Army; Indian Army
- Type: Artillery
- Size: Regiment
- Mottos: Sarvatra, Izzat-O-Iqbal (Everywhere with Honour and Glory); Sarvada Pratham Hamara Dharam
- Colors: "Red & Navy Blue"
- Anniversaries: 15 January (Raising Day); 28 February (Meiktila Day)
- Battle honours: Meiktila

Insignia
- Abbreviation: 1 Fd Regt

1 Field Regiment (Meiktila) is part of the Regiment of Artillery of the Indian Army. It is the first field artillery unit with Indian officers.

== Formation ==
Following, the Indian Rebellion of 1857, all Indian artillery units were disbanded and replaced by British units, except for a few mountain batteries. This total ban on Indian artillery units existed till the British Government relented on this order, allowing the first Indian Artillery unit to be formed in 1935. A year prior to the raising of the unit, volunteers from other arms were attached to 14th Field Brigade RA for training, to form the nucleus of warrant officers and other non-commissioned officers for the new Indian Brigade. The regiment was raised with four horse drawn batteries on 15 January 1935 as ‘A’ Field Brigade, Indian Artillery at Bangalore. The first commanding officer was Lieutenant Colonel GA Rickards DSO, MC (later Colonel / honorary Major General). (Note: The designation of ‘field brigade’ of the time is the same as the ‘regiment’ of today.)

The use of the letter ‘A’ distinguished it from Royal Artillery field brigades, which used numbers instead of letters. The newly raised unit took the place of 14 Field Brigade RA, which proceeded to the United Kingdom. At the time of raising, the unit had three King's Commissioned Indian Officers - Lieutenant Prem Singh Gyani, Lieutenant Paramasiva Prabhakar Kumaramangalam and Lieutenant Anup Singh Kalha. Subadar-Major and Honorary Captain Muhammad Buksh, Sardar Bahadur I.O.M. was the Viceroy's commissioned officer. Muhammad Buksh was subsequently awarded the Additional Member of the Military Division of the Most Excellent Order of the British Empire.

‘A’ Field Brigade subsequently provided the nucleus for ‘B’ Field Brigade and ‘C’ Field Regiment. These units now exist as 2 Medium Regiment (Self Propelled) (Letse & Point 171) of the Indian Army and 2 Field Regiment of the Pakistan Army respectively.

== Reorganisation ==
By Indian Army Order 204 of 1938, the nomenclature ‘Brigade’ was replaced by ‘Regiment’ and thus the title of the unit became ‘A’ Field Regiment. The unit moved to School of Artillery, Deolali in 1941. On 15 May 1941, the regiment was reorganised. The horses were exchanged for mechanised transport and the unit organised into two 8-gun batteries - 1st and 2nd Batteries forming a new 1st Field Battery and 3rd and 4th Batteries forming a new 2nd Field Battery. The unit was re-designated as 1 Indian Field Regiment in August 1941.

== Name changes ==
The regiment has undergone the following changes in its designation -

- ‘A’ Field Brigade, Indian Artillery
- ‘A’ Field Regiment, Indian Artillery
- 1st Indian Field Regiment, Indian Artillery
- 1st Indian Field Regiment, RIA
- 1st Indian Field Regiment (Self Propelled), RIA
- 1 Field Regiment (Self Propelled)
- 1 Medium Regiment (Self Propelled)
- 1 Medium Regiment
- 1 Field Regiment

== Equipment and batteries ==
Year	Batteries	Equipment
1935	1 and 2	18-pounder (horse drawn)
	3 and 4	4.5-inch howitzer (horse drawn)
1941	1 and 2	25-pounder towed guns
1946	1, 48 and 50	Sexton (self-propelled)
1971	1, 48 and 50	Abbott (self-propelled)
	1, 48 and 50	122 mm D-30 howitzer
	1, 48 and 50	105 mm Indian field gun
Present	1, 48 and 50	?

== Composition ==
At formation, the class composition of the four batteries were as follows – the 1st of Madrasis, originally formed from the disbanded Madras Pioneers, the 2nd, Punjabi Mussalmans, the 3rd, Rajputana Rajputs and the 4th Ranghars. The unit was converted into a single class regiment in April 1946 with Rajput troops, when two batteries with Rajput troops from 17 Field Regiment (which itself was raised as 8th Battalion, the 7th Rajput Regiment) joined the regiment.

== Operations (pre independence) ==
World War II

The regiment was sent to Burma in February 1942 from Calcutta. It became part of the 17 Infantry Division during the Burma campaign. From February 1942, the two 8 -gun batteries provided commendable artillery support during the withdrawal of the division. The unit returned to India in May 1942 with four guns saved. This was followed by two years of intensive training, following which the regiment and one attached battery of Gwalior Scindia forces fought in Burma under the same division.

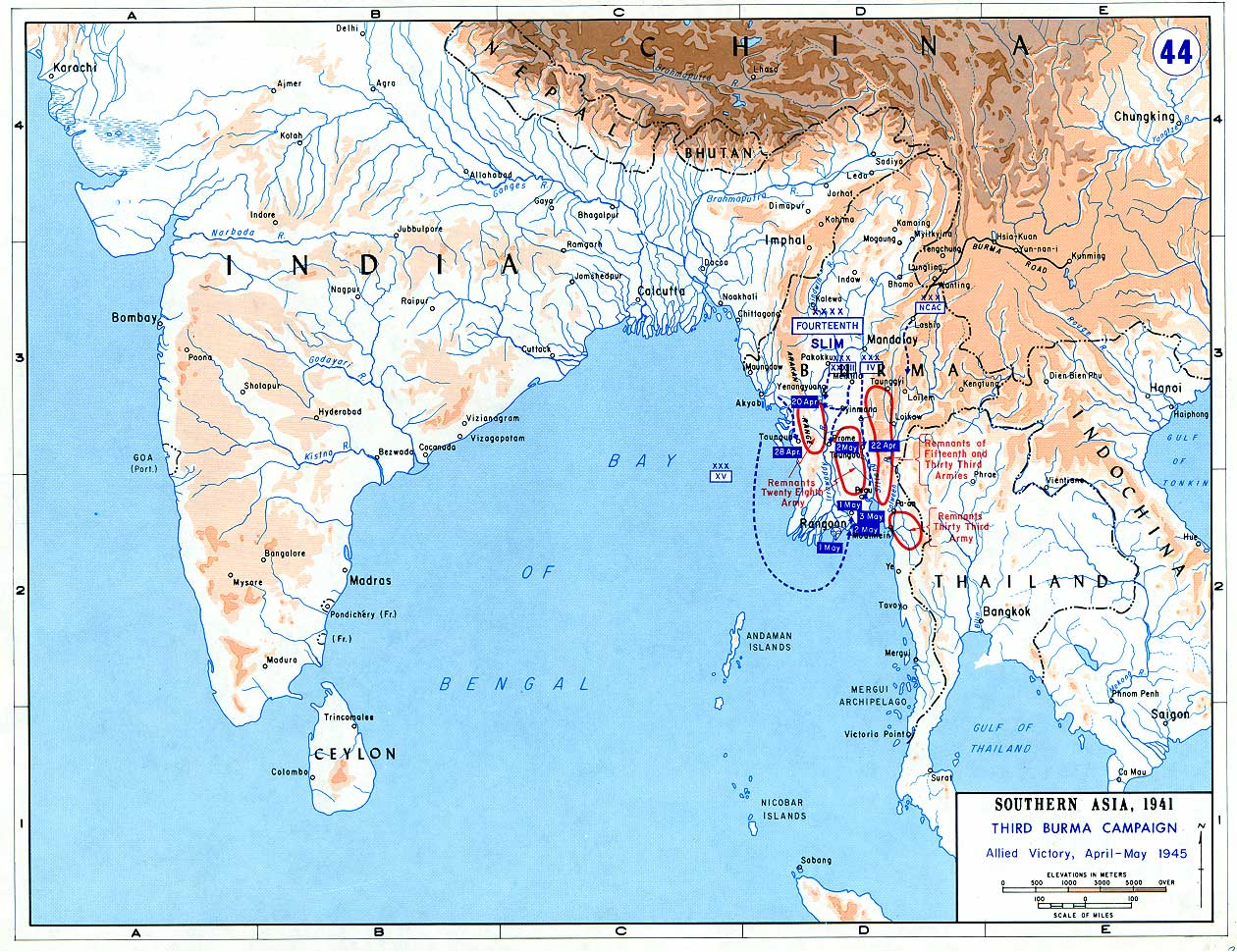
Allied Third Burma Campaign, April- May 1945

Meiktila is a city in central Burma and was advanced supply base and principal air-field for the Japanese forces in Burma. The defences to this city were prepared for a long period and was held in strength by the Japanese. 17 Infantry Division was assigned the task of capturing Meiktila in February 1945. The main attack was to be by the 48th Indian Infantry Brigade, which had to attack the city from the north, towards south. Under the command of Lieutenant Colonel DWD Nicholl, 1 Indian Field Regiment was placed in direct support of the charging brigade. The battle started on 28 February 1945 and lasted for four days. The fall of Meiktila was a turning point in the battle for Burma.

In the advance to Rangoon, 1 Indian Field Regiment had the occasion to mount the 25-pounder guns on open railway wagons, patrolling along the railway tracks. These guns so mounted enabled artillery support to be given to the stretched-out infantry dispositions. Following the war, the regiment returned to India and was converted into a self-propelled unit.

The regiment was awarded the following honours and gallantry awards-

- Honour title- Meiktila : For the laudable contribution to the capture of the strategic city of Meiktila.
- Military Cross - 4 (Major AW Litchfield, Captain Avtar Singh, Subedar Sukh Singh, Captain Ranbir Bakshi)
- Indian Distinguished Service Medal - 1
- Mentioned in Despatches- 21
- Force Commander's Certificate- 1
- Member of the Most Excellent Order of the British Empire (MBE)- 2
- Military Medal- 3
- Certificate of gallantry- 3

== Operations (post independence) ==
Operation Polo

The regiment was despatched immediately after independence to the Hyderabad State for internal security duties and was part of Smash Force under 1 Armoured Division.

Indo-Pakistani War of 1965

During the war, the regiment equipped with self-propelled Sextons supported 2 (Independent) Armoured Division (the corps reserve of 11 Corps). From 6 September 1965, the unit was in support of 4 Mountain Division in the Battle of Asal Uttar. The regiment won the following gallantry awards during the war-

- Sena Medal- 1
- Mentioned in Despatches- 4
- COAS Commendation Card- 2

Indo-Pakistani War of 1971

The regiment saw action in the western front. Equipped with the self propelled Abbotts, it was part of Operation Cactus Lily in support of 1 Armoured Division.

Operation Blue Star

The regiment took part in this operation and captured a large number of terrorists and weapons. Three officers were awarded the COAS Commendation Card during this operation.

Operation Rakshak II

The regiment was deployed for counter terrorism operation between April and August 1992.

Operation Meghdoot

1 Medium Regiment was deployed in Siachen Glacier in 2015. Lance Havildar Ganga Singh was mentioned in despatches.

== Other achievements ==
- Major SS Sekhon and Major KS Chauhan proved their mettle in various National and Himalayan car rallies. They were awarded with the Vishisht Seva Medal and COAS Commendation Card.

== Notable officers ==
- General Paramasiva Prabhakar Kumaramangalam DSO, MBE – 6th Chief of the Army Staff (COAS) of the Indian Army from 1967 to 1969.
- Lieutenant General PS Gyani OBE, PVSM – First Indian officer to be commissioned out of the Royal Military Academy, Woolwich, in 1932. He was commissioned into A Field Brigade and later on became the first Indian officer to command an Indian field regiment, the 2 Indian Field Regiment.
- Major General Ranbir Bakshi MC - Commanded the regiment, raised the Artillery Centre at Nashik, commanded School of Artillery (1959-1961) and National Defence Academy, Khadakwasla (1964-1966). He was also an outstanding swimmer and represented the country.
- Major General AS Naravane – Colonel Commandant of Artillery.
- Lieutenant General Jack Farj Rafael Jacob PVSM – Served in the unit and went on to raise 3 Field Regiment.

== Legacy ==
The Regiment of Artillery celebrated its Golden Jubilee on 15 January 1980. In spite of its long history, the regiment opted to use 15 January 1935, the raising day of ‘A’ Field Brigade, the first wholly Indian artillery unit as its birthday.

== Motto ==
The motto of the regiment is ‘सर्वदा प्रथम हमारा धर्म (Sarvada Pratham Hamara Dharam)’, which translates to ‘Being the first is our duty.

== See also ==
- List of artillery regiments of Indian Army
