= 101 Field Regiment (India) =

Indian Army artillery unit

101 Field Regiment (Harar Kalan)
- Active: 1963 – present
- Country: India
- Allegiance: India
- Branch: Indian Army
- Type: Artillery
- Size: Regiment
- Nickname(s): One-O-One
- Motto(s): Sarvatra, Izzat-O-Iqbal (Everywhere with Honour and Glory)
- Colors: Red & Navy Blue
- Anniversaries: 1 October – Raising Day; 10 December – Battle Honour Day
- Equipment: Indian Field Gun
- Battle honours: Harar Kalan

Insignia
- Abbreviation: 101 Fd Regt

101 Field Regiment is part of the Regiment of Artillery of the Indian Army.

== Formation and history ==
The regiment was raised as 101 Field Regiment (Self Propelled) on 1 October 1963 at Babina, Uttar Pradesh, the first Indian artillery regiment to be raised as a self-propelled regiment. The troops were drawn from other existing medium and field artillery regiments. The first commanding officer was Lieutenant Colonel (later Major General) RCV Apte. The regiment was subsequently converted to a medium regiment and is now back as a field regiment. It has served in Babina, Jhansi, Ratnuchak, Chhangu, Jodhpur, Poonch, Secunderabad, Udhampur, Faridkot and at the Line of Control (LoC).

== Class composition ==
The regiment was re-organised as a single class regiment with Maratha troops in May 1964.

== Equipment ==
The regiment has used the following artillery guns.

- 25-pounder self-propelled, tracked, Sexton
- FV433, 105 mm, self-propelled Abbot
- 105 mm Indian Field Gun
- 130 mm M-46 Field Gun

== Operations ==
The regiment has taken part in the following operations –

Indo-Pakistani War of 1965

Within 18 months of its raising, the regiment saw its first major operation. It took part in Operation Nepal - the Indian attack in the Sialkot sector. It was part of 1 Artillery Brigade under 1 Armoured Division. In these 18 days of intense action, the regiment equipped with Sextons provided able artillery support to the offensive actions of 43 Lorried Brigade. It also provided support to 62 Cavalry and 8 Garhwal during the capture of Kaloi. Major Adarsh Kumar Kocchar was awarded the Vir Chakra for his gallant actions and an important role in breaking the counterattack by timely destruction of enemy tanks. In addition, it was awarded two Sena Medals, four mentioned in despatches and two COAS Commendation Cards.

Indo-Pakistani War of 1971

The regiment took part in Operation Cactus Lily in the Shakargarh sector on the western front of the war. It was equipped with self-propelled Abbots and was part of 39 Artillery Brigade under 39 Infantry Division. The division was tasked to capture Shakargarh in a five phased operation, of which the third phase was the capture of Harar Kalan. The initial attack by 1 Dogra was repulsed by a well-prepared enemy on the night of 7 December 1971. Captain Sheo Ganesh Singh was a Forward Observation Officer (FOO) with the Dogras. He was grievously wounded while directing artillery fire in an effort to neutralise the Pakistanis and help 1 Dogra to extricate. He was posthumously awarded the Vir Chakra for gallantry. On the night of 10 December, a second and better prepared attack by 72 Infantry Brigade took place. Persistent and accurate artillery bombardment prior to the assault by 1 Mahar, ensured the capture of Harar Kalan without much opposition. Both 1 Mahar and 101 Field Regiment were awarded the honour title 'Harar Kalan'. The regiment lost one officer and 10 other ranks during the war. Two officers and 30 other ranks were wounded.

Operation Parakram

The regiment was in the Poonch sector during the standoff with Pakistan and was involved in artillery fire across the LoC.

== Motto ==
The motto of the regiment is One-O-One, The Only One, The Fighting One, The Happy One.

== Gallantry awards ==
The regiment has won the following gallantry awards -

- Param Vishisht Seva Medal (PVSM) – 4
- Uttam Yudh Seva Medal (UYSM) – 1
- Ati Vishisht Seva Medal (AVSM) – 3
- Vir Chakra (VrC) – 2
- Shaurya Chakra (SC) – 2
- Sena Medal (SM) – 4
- Mention in Despatches – 6
- Vishisht Seva Medal (VSM) – 3
- Chief of Army Staff Commendation cards – 10
- General Officer Commanding-in-chief Commendation cards – 21

== Notable officers ==
- Major General Ramchandra Vinayak Apte, PVSM, AVSM – first commanding officer.
- Lieutenant General Baljit Singh, AVSM, VSM – commanded the regiment, author.
- Lieutenant General Parmendra Kumar Singh Singh, PVSM, AVSM – General Officer Commanding-in-Chief of South Western Command – commissioned into 2 Field Regiment, went on to command the unit.
- Lieutenant General AK Sahni, PVSM, UYSM, SM, VSM – 'sword of honour' winner and General Officer Commanding-in-Chief of South Western Command.
- Major General AC Chatterjee – who was also a 'sword of honour' winner.

== Other achievements ==
- The regiment had seven 'silver gunner' officers and the first test pilot to the Army Aviation Corps.
- The regiment has proudly participated thrice in the Republic Day parade.
- It has won the General Officer Commanding in Chief's (Western Command) unit citation in 2016.
- Havildar Sarvesh Anil Kushare of the regiment is a renowned high jumper and won the gold medal in the 36th National Games in 2022.

== See also ==
- List of artillery regiments of Indian Army
