= 32 Field Regiment (India) =

- Active: 1948 – present
- Country: India
- Allegiance: India
- Branch: Indian Army
- Type: Artillery
- Size: Regiment
- Motto(s): Sarvatra, Izzat-O-Iqbal (Everywhere with Honour and Glory)
- Colors: Red & Navy Blue
- Anniversaries: 1 July – Raising Day

Insignia
- Abbreviation: 32 Fd Regt

32 Field Regiment is part of the Regiment of Artillery of the Indian Army.

== Formation and history ==
The regiment traces its history to 1 April 1948, when the 1st Battalion, The East Punjab Militia was raised at Amritsar. The first commanding officer was Lieutenant Colonel HS Grewal from 4th Horse (Hodson's Horse).

The regiment was ordered to be re-organised on the lines of an infantry battalion on 1 October 1950. On 1 February 1951, it was designated 5 Border Scouts Battalion and was under the command of Lieutenant Colonel Anokh Singh. In April 1956, it was decided to disband the Border Scouts Battalions. A decision was taken to re-organise 5 Border Scouts Battalion as an artillery unit. On 1 July 1956, the unit was equipped with 4.2-inch mortars and was designated 32 Heavy Mortar Regiment at Ranchi. The first gunner commanding officer was Lieutenant Colonel AN Sumanwar. The regiment was subsequently converted to a light regiment. It became a pack regiment on 1 July 1966, a towed regiment in 1972 and a field regiment on 16 March 1973. The regiment consists of 112, 113 and 114 field batteries.

== Class composition ==
The regiment in its early years was a mixed class unit with a Sikh majority. It was converted to a single class unit on 1 January 1961 with Dogra troops.

== Operations ==
The regiment has taken part in the following operations:

- Indo-Pakistani War of 1947–1948 - No 1, East Punjab Militia was placed under Headquarters, 50 Parachute Brigade for operations in the Samba sector. The unit was also given the task of clearing Nekowal village (near Ranbir Singh Pora) of Pakistani forces. The unit managed to clear the village on 5 November 1948 and inflicted heavy casualties. Havildar Natha Singh and Sepoy Pritam Singh of ‘B’ Company was mentioned in despatches for their acts of bravery.
- Sino-Indian War, 1962 – 32 Heavy Mortar Regiment saw action in the Chushul sector during the war. A troop from the regiment was air-landed at Chushul and made available to 114 Infantry Brigade. This troop moved to Lukung in support of 5 Jat.
- Indo-Pakistani War of 1965 – 32 Light Regiment was part of the divisional artillery of 3 Infantry Division (under 15 Corps). 114 Light Battery was placed under 121 Infantry Brigade Group and grouped along with 85 Light Regiment. It was in support of 1 Guards in the battle of Kala Pahar. The role of 114 Light Battery during this battle earned it the nickname Kala Pahar battery.
- Operation Blue Star – The unit took part in this operation, during which it lost Naik Balbir Singh.
- Operation Rakshak – 1987, 2003-5
- Operation Meghdoot - Siachen Glacier – September 1992 to April 1993

== Gallantry awards ==
The regiment has won the following gallantry awards:

- Mentioned in dispatches –
  - Havildar Natha Singh, Sepoy Pritam Singh (Indo-Pakistani War of 1947–1948)
  - Major Amit Hooda (Operation Parakram)
- COAS Commendation Card -
  - Lieutenant Colonel Sujit Kumar Swain

== Scouts legacy ==
Though a regular artillery regiment, the unit still carries the legacy of a border scouts regiment in the form of a pipe band and the Garuda – the symbol of the scouts.

== Notable officers ==
- Lieutenant General Surinder Nath, PVSM, AVSM – commanded the unit between 1975 and 1978 and went on to become Vice Chief of the Army Staff between 1993 and 1995.

== Other achievements ==
- Sepoy Ajit Singh won the bronze medal in the marathon in 1954.
- The regiment received a unit appreciation from General Officer Commanding 14 Corps and General Officer Commanding-in-Chief Northern Command for it role during Operation Rakshak between 2003 and 2005.

== War cry and salutation ==
The war cry of the regiment is ‘दुर्गा माता की जय’ (Durga Mata Ki Jai), which translates to ‘Victory to Goddess Durga’. The salutation used in the unit is जय दुर्गे (Jai Durge).

== See also ==
- List of artillery regiments of Indian Army
