= 2 Medium Regiment (India) =

Indian Army artillery unit

2 Medium Regiment (Self Propelled)
- Active: 1940 – present
- Country: India
- Allegiance: British India; India
- Branch: British Indian Army; Indian Army
- Type: Artillery
- Size: Regiment
- Motto(s): SARVATRA, IZZAT-O-IQBAL (Everywhere with Honour and Glory)
- Colors: "Red & Navy Blue"
- Equipment: K-9 Vajra
- Battle honours: Letse; Point 171

Insignia
- Abbreviation: 2 Med Regt (SP)

2 Medium Regiment (Self Propelled) (Letse & Point 171) is part of the Regiment of Artillery of the Indian Army.

== Formation ==
The regiment was raised on 15 May 1940 as 'B' Field Brigade, Indian Artillery at Bangalore by Lieutenant Colonel (later Brigadier) Guy Horsfield. (Note: The designation of 'field brigade' of the time is the same as the 'regiment' of today.) It consisted of Headquarters (H.Q.), 3rd Indian and 4th Indian Field Batteries. It was subsequently redesignated as the 2 Indian Field Regiment. During its deployment in the Persia and Iraq Command (PAIC), 7th Indian Field Battery joined the regiment. (Note: 3rd Field Battery later became part of 7 Field Regiment in January 1947 as 18 (Bir Hacheim) Field Battery.)

== Composition ==
In the early years, there was one battery each of South Indian Class (SIC), Marathas and Sikhs. In May 1946, the regiment was converted to a single class regiment with Sikh soldiers.

== Name changes ==
The regiment has undergone the following changes in its designation:

- 'B' Field Brigade, Indian Artillery
- 2nd Indian Field Regiment, Indian Artillery
- 2nd Indian Field Regiment, RIA
- 2nd Indian Field Regiment (Self Propelled), RIA
- 2nd Field Regiment (Self Propelled)
- 2nd Medium Regiment (Self Propelled)

== Operations ==
World War II – North Africa

Bir Hakeim in Libya

In May 1942, the Regiment joined 6 Indian Division in the PAIC. It moved to Basra, Iraq and later to Syria and Iran. The regiment was deployed in the Western desert in February 1942 as part of the 3rd Indian Motor Brigade, which formed part of the Gazala-Bir Hakeim defences. (Note: Gazala is near the modern town of Ayn al Ghazālah, west of Tobruk in Libya.) (Note: Bir Hakeim is also spelled as Bir Hachiem.) It was equipped with 25-pounder guns and fought against the German Afrika Korps under Rommel in the Battle of Bir Hakeim.

On 26 May 1942, the Brigade Group with 2 Field Regiment and 1 Indian Anti-Tank Regiment as its artillery component, moved to Point 171, south of Bir Hakeim in Libya. Late in the evening of 26 May, 2 Field Regiment was warned of an impending attack by Rommel's forces early next morning. Rommel's forces had 15 Panzer Division, 21 Panzer Division, the Italian Ariete Division and 90 Light Infantry Division. The defenders were hopelessly outnumbered, but determined to give a fight, which ended up creating history. Throughout the night, the Regiment made preparations to face an impending armour attack on its gun positions. The defences at Point 171 were incomplete, without mines, uncoordinated and without any tanks deployed in the Brigade Box area, but were ready to face the might of the Germans.

Early morning of 27 May saw Rommel's forces moving out of their harbour hardly 2 miles away. The Battle at Point 171 was so swift and bloody, that in about two hours' time Rommel's forces had over-run the defences of the Brigade, but not before facing the wrath of the Indian Gunners who kept firing till their positions were over-run. In the battle, despite being surrounded from all sides by italian tanks and Semovente 75/18, the gunners showed indomitable spirit and courage and destroyed many tanks (estimated 52–64). The ferocity of the battle can be gauged from the numbers of enemy tanks destroyed as also from the fact that the losses suffered by 2 Field Regiment included six officers and many men killed, and many wounded or taken prisoners of war. For its gallant action, the regiment was honoured with the title Point 171, the first Indian Artillery regiment to be awarded a honour title.

It was awarded the following gallantry awards –

- Distinguished Service Order - Lieutenant Colonel G Horsfield, Major PP Kumaramangalam
- Military Cross - 1
- Indian Order of Merit - Havildar Modan Singh
- Indian Distinguished Service Medal - Havildar Major Lakshmi Narasu, Havildar Bahadur Khan, Havildar Ghulam Ali, Naik Kehar Singh, Lance Naik Yesudas
- Mentioned in Despatches – 7

World War II – Burma

After proving its mettle in North Africa, the regiment was inducted into the Burma campaign in 1944. After a short three weeks rest at Kalemyo, the regiment joined 7th Indian Infantry Division, IV Corps at Pokokku. It was then part of the Fourteenth Army and subsequently the 20th Indian Division. In 1945, it was part of the 255th Indian Tank Brigade, which was temporarily under 17th Indian Division.

On 23 February 1945, the Regiment was positioned in defence near Letse (east of Arakan), Burma; when the Japanese launched a Brigade attack. The gunners of the regiment killed around 300 Japanese soldiers in a deadly artillery attack. The regiment thus got its second honour title – Letse and the following gallantry awards –

- Order of the British Empire - Lieutenant Colonel PS Gyani
- Military Cross - 1

In May 1946, the regiment was converted to a single class regiment with Sikh soldiers and into a self-propelled artillery regiment.

Indo-Pakistani War of 1947–1948

Participation of Indian Artillery in Jammu and Kashmir operations during 1947-48 commenced with the first flights of civil and Royal Indian Air Force Dakotas, which transported 1 Sikh Battalion to Srinagar on the morning of 27 October 1947. Personnel of 2 Field Regiment (SP) and 13 Field Regiment donned uniforms of 1 Sikh and proceeded as a composite company of the battalion under Captain RL Chauhan of 13 Field Regiment. It operated as infantry till the first week of November 1947, when four 3.7 inch howitzers reached the area. Thereafter, they took over the guns and assisted the infantry to drive out the infiltrators along Srinagar - Baramula road.

Indo-Pakistani War of 1965

The regiment equipped with 25-pounder self propelled Sextons was part of the 1 Artillery Brigade under 1 Armoured Division. It along with 101 Field Regiment (SP) and 71 Medium Regiment were allotted to provide timely and accurate fire support to 1 Armoured Brigade during the Battle of Phillora.

The performance of the gunners was summarised by Brigadier KK Singh, MVC, Commander 1 Armoured Brigade in the 'Report' sent by him after the operations, "During the operations our gunners supported us to the hilt-a truly magnificent performance. The success of the armoured units was in great measure facilitated by the promptitude, accuracy and intensity of our artillery fire through the Commanding Officer 2 Field Regiment (SP) and his battery commanders and forward observation officers. Without this support we could not have done half as well as we did."

In the Battle of Phillora, the bulk of the tanks of the Pakistani 1 Corps were destroyed. 'C' Squadron of Poona Horse with 5/9 Gorkha Rifles battalion duly supported by massive artillery fires captured Phillora. The intensity of artillery fire can be appreciated from the fact that just one regiment, 2 Field Regiment (SP), fired 10,436 rounds during the operations.

The unit won the following gallantry awards –

- Vir Chakra – 2nd Lieutenant Bhupinder Kumar Vaid
- COAS Commendation Cards – 10

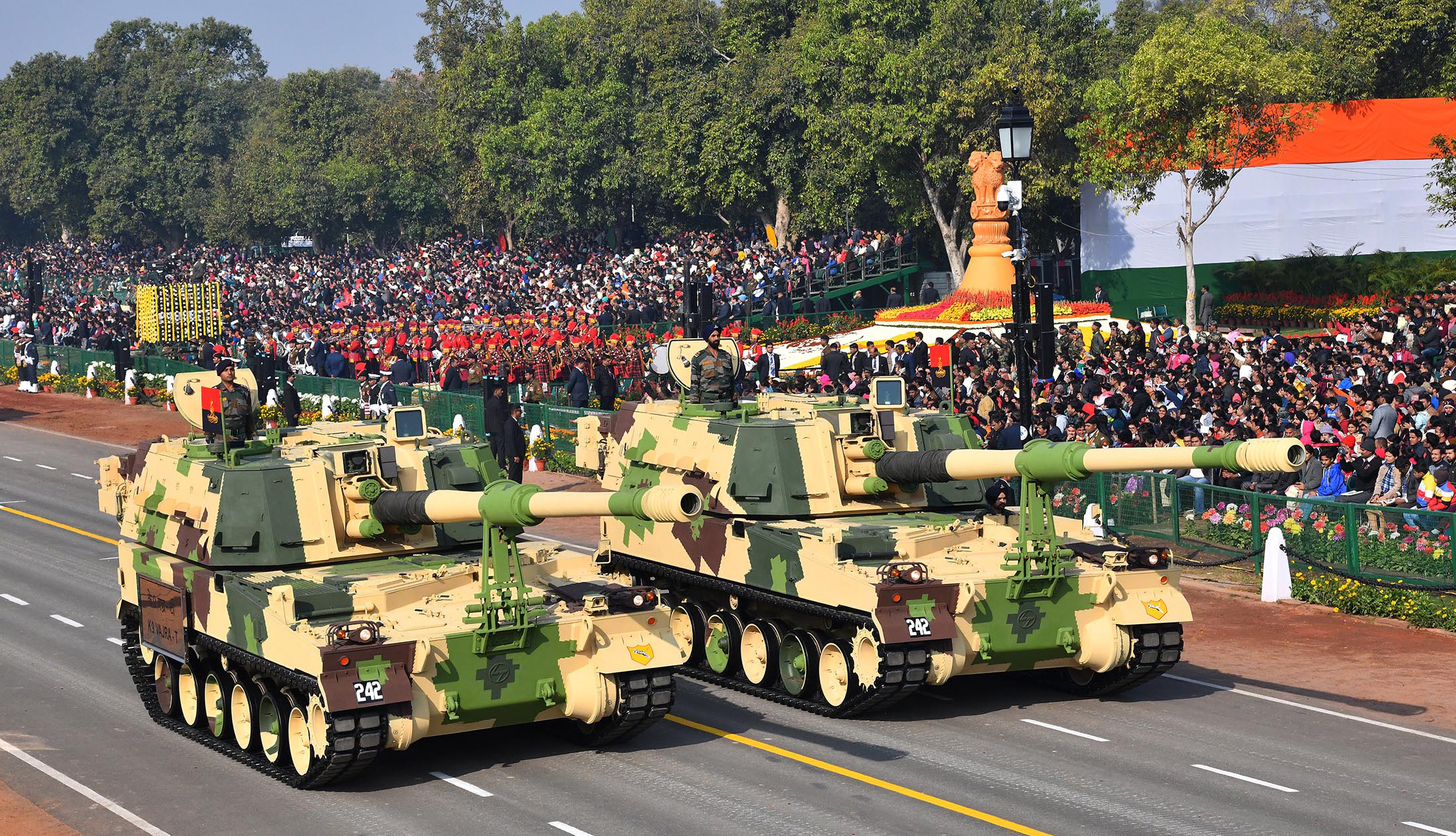
K9 Vajra-T tanks of 2 Medium Regiment passes through the Rajpath, at the 70th Republic Day Celebrations, in New Delhi on January 26, 2019

The present

The regiment presently consists of 3, 6 and 39 medium batteries.

== Equipment ==
The regiment has been equipped with the following artillery guns -

- 25-pounder guns
- 25-pounder SP, tracked, Sexton
- FV433, 105 mm Self-Propelled "Abbot"
- K-9 Vajra

== Honours and awards ==
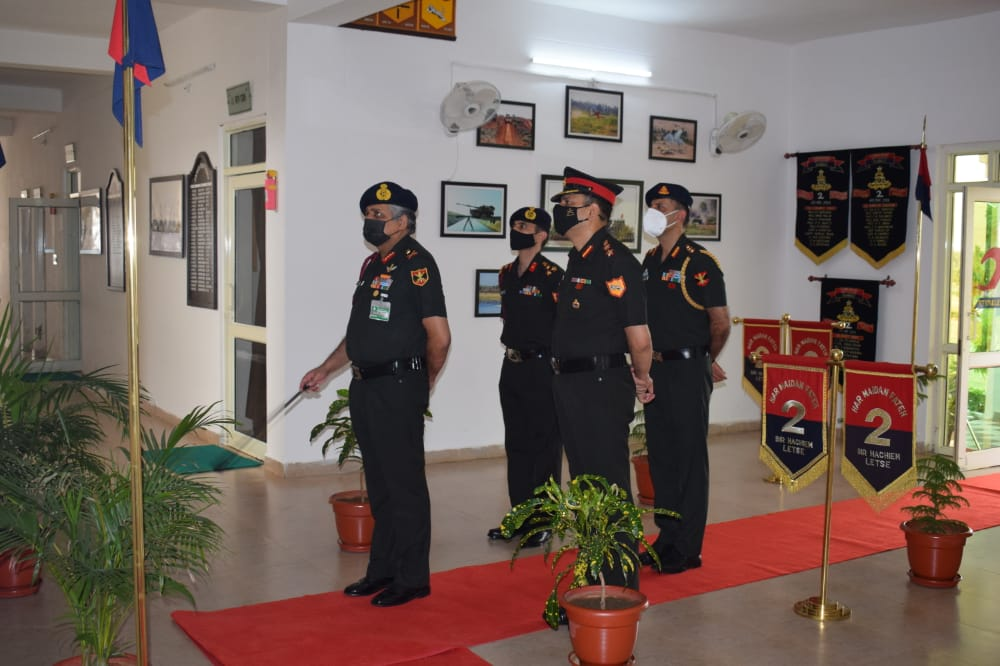
Lieutenant General Raj Shukla, GOC-IN-C ARTRAC, visiting the regiment, July 2021.

- The regiment has the unique honour of having two Chiefs of Army Staff as its officers - General Paramasiva Prabhakar Kumaramangalam of the Indian Army and General Tikka Khan of the Pakistan Army.
- BHM (Later Subedar) Makhan Singh represented India in athletics in the 1962 Asian Games and the 1964 Summer Olympics and had the distinction of winning the Arjuna Award.
- The regiment with its newly acquired K-9 Vajra tanks participated in the Republic Day Parade in 2019.

== Notable commanders ==
- General Paramasiva Prabhakar Kumaramangalam DSO, MBE — 6th chief of the Army staff (COAS) of the Indian Army from 1967 to 1969
- General Tikka Khan HJ S.Pk — the first chief of Army staff of Pakistan, March 1972 till March 1976
- Lieutenant General PS Gyani OBE, PVSM — first Indian officer to be commissioned out of the Royal Military Academy, Woolwich, in 1932, first Indian officer to command an Indian field regiment, the 2 Indian Field Regiment
- Major General AS Naravane — colonel commandant of artillery
- Lieutenant General Anjan Mukherjee PVSM, AVSM —director general, financial planning, Army HQ and director general artillery

== War Cry ==
The war cry of the regiment is 'Har Maidan Fateh' (हर मैदान फ़तेह), which translates to Victory in every field.

== See also ==
- List of artillery regiments of Indian Army
