= Punjab Boundary Force =

The Punjab Boundary Force was an ad hoc military force to restore law and order during the communal carnages of the partition of India in the Punjab. The force was based on the 4th Indian Division and commanded by Maj Gen T.W. Rees. The force was unable to execute its task successfully and it was disbanded so that the newly formed dominion armies of India and Pakistan could take charge of the situation.

== Composition ==
The Force had approximately 15 Indian and 10 Pakistani battalions, and comprised 5th Indian Infantry Brigade, 11th Indian Infantry Brigade of the division and three additional brigades, namely the 14th Parachute Brigade (which became part of the Pakistan Army), 43rd Indian Lorried Infantry Brigade (ex 1st Armoured Division), and 114th Indian Infantry Brigade. The 50th Parachute Brigade and 77th Parachute Brigade (both formerly with 2nd Airborne Division), as well as the 123rd Indian Infantry Brigade, were attached to the Force.

== Formation and disbandment ==
The Boundary Force was established on July 17, 1947, with its headquarters at Lahore. It became operational on August 1, 1947, but was disbanded on September 1 because of its ineffectiveness in controlling the riots breaking out in consequence of Partition.

Maj Gen Rees was provided Brig D.S. Brar and Brig M. Ayub Khan (who later became field marshal and President of Pakistan) from India and Pakistan respectively as "Military Advisors". He was later provided Brig K.S. Thimayya (India) and Brig Nazir Ahmed (Pakistan) as "Alternate Military Advisors". However, Gen Rees refused to heed advice from his advisors, which led to his being criticised; he rebuked Thimayya that he was not going to take advice from him being ten years his senior. In addition, Rees was criticised by politicians from both sides.

In the 25 August meeting of the Joint Defence Council at Lahore, Gen Rees stated that the Boundary Force was fatigued and their mood explosive. The British officers, he said, had done their best and the situation was beyond salvation. He further recommended that the two dominions now take responsibility for the security of refugees on their respective sides of the border. After Rees handed over, Major General K. S. Thimayya reportedly took over command of the Boundary Force.
