= 1st Armoured Division (India) =

Division of the Indian Army

- Formation Badge of the 1st Armoured Division
- Founded: 1 September 1945; 81 years ago
- Country: India
- Branch: Indian Army
- Type: Armoured
- Size: Division
- Part of: II Corps
- Garrison/HQ: Patiala
- Nickname: Airawat Division (The Black Elephant Division)
- Mascot: The Indian elephant
- Engagements: Indo-Pakistani War of 1965

Commanders
- Notable commanders: Jayanto Nath Chaudhuri; Rajinder Singh 'Sparrow'

The 1st Armoured Division is an armoured division of the Indian Army, headquartered at Patiala, Punjab. It is part of II Corps of the Indian Army's Western Command.

== Formation ==
The division was formed when the 31st Indian Armoured Division was re-designated on 1 September 1945.

The 1st Armoured Division was one of two divisional headquarters transferred from the British Indian Army to the Indian Army upon the partition of British India in August 1947. (Note: A third divisional headquarters, of the 4th Indian Division, had become the Punjab Boundary Force.) At the time, it had its divisional headquarters at Secunderabad and the 43rd Lorried Infantry Brigade away with the Punjab Boundary Force. In June 1946, the wartime 255th Indian Tank Brigade was redesignated as 1st Armoured Brigade and assigned to 1st Armoured Division.

== Operation Polo ==
The division played a major role in Operation Polo, the integration of Hyderabad into the Indian Union in 1948. During this time Major General Joyanto Nath Chaudhuri was serving as the division's commander, also serving as Military Governor of the state in the immediate aftermath of the invasion. For the Hyderabad operation, the division controlled the 1st Armoured Brigade and the 7th and 9th Infantry Brigades.

The order of battle (ORBAT) for the division was as follows:

Strike Force

- 9 Dogra
- Skinner's Horse (minus one squadron)
- 1 troop Division HQ Squadron
- Battery 1 Field Regiment (Self Propelled)
- 1 Forward Air Control team

Smash Force - 1 Armoured Brigade (Brigadier S.D Verma)

- 3 Cavalry (minus one squadron)
- 17 Horse (minus one squadron)
- One troop Skinner's Horse
- 1 Field Regiment (Self Propelled) (less one battery)
- 2nd Battery 40 Medium Regiment
- One company 9 Dogra

Kill Force - 7 Infantry Brigade (Brigadier Gurbachan Singh)

- 2 Sikh
- 3 Grenadiers
- 14 Rajput
- 9 Para Field Regiment

Vir Force - 9 Infantry Brigade (Brigadier Apji Randhir Singh)

- 3 Punjab
- 2/1 Gorkha Rifles
- 34 Anti Tank Regiment

== Indo-Pakistani War of 1965 ==
The 1st Armoured Division with Major General Rajinder Singh 'Sparrow' as the GOC played an important role in the Indo-Pakistani War of 1965. He was awarded the Mahavir Chakra for his role during the war.

The division was part of the I Corps on the western front. The order of battle was as follows-

1 Armoured Division (Major General Rajinder Singh)

- 1 Armoured Brigade (Brigadier Khem Karan Singh)
  - 17 Horse
  - 16 Light Cavalry
  - 62 Cavalry (was also part of other formations)
- 43 Lorried Infantry Brigade (Brigadier HS Dhillon)
  - 2 Lancers
  - 8 Garhwal Rifles
  - 5 Jat
  - 5/9 Gorkha Rifles
- Divisional Reserves
  - 4 Horse
  - 9 Dogra
- 1 Artillery Brigade (Brigadier OP Malhotra)
  - 2 Field Regiment (SP)
  - 71 Medium Regiment
  - 101 Field Regiment (SP)
- Brigades under temporary operational command
  - 35 Infantry Brigade (from 9 to 16 September 1965)
  - 116 Infantry Brigade (from 9 to 12 September 1965)
  - 58 Infantry Brigade (from 12 to 16 September 1965)

The major battles fought by the division include the Battle of Phillora and the Battle of Chawinda. At the time of the cease-fire, 1 Corps held around 500 square kilometres of Pakistani territory and had caused substantial damage to the enemy armour. Lieutenant Colonel A B Tarapore, 17 Horse was posthumously awarded the Param Vir Chakra, Major General Rajinder Singh, GOC, 1 Armoured Division, Brig KK Singh, Commander 1 Armoured Brigade, Lieutenant Colonel MMS Bakshi, Commandant 4 Horse, and Major Bhupinder Singh, 4 Horse were awarded the Maha Vir Chakra.

== Indo-Pakistani War of 1971 ==
The division was under the XI Corps, but did not see action. The order of battle (ORBAT) for the division was as follows-

1 Armoured Division (Major General Gurbachan Singh)

- 93 Independent Reconnaissance Squadron (from 65 Armoured Regiment)
- 1 Armoured Brigade (Brigadier N.S. Cheema)
  - 2 Lancers
  - 65 Armoured Regiment
  - 67 Armoured Regiment
  - 68 Armoured Regiment

(all equipped with Vijayanta tanks)

- 43 Lorried Infantry Brigade (Brigadier Ramesh Chandra)
  - 1 Madras
  - 1 Jat
  - 1 Garhwal Rifles

(all equipped with TOPAS armoured personnel carriers)

== The Present ==
Following the 1971 Indo-Pakistani war, the division was re-organised with the 1st and 43rd Armoured Brigades and relocated in 1972 to Ambala. In 1984, it was reorganized with the 1st, 43rd and 98th Armoured Brigades. At present, the Divisional Headquarters is located at Patiala as are the 43 and 98 Armoured Brigades. 1 Armoured Brigade is located at Nabha and 1 Artillery Brigade at Ambala.
