= 71 Field Regiment (India) =

- Active: 1962 – present
- Allegiance: India
- Branch: Indian Army
- Type: Artillery
- Size: Regiment
- Nickname: Siachen Sentinels
- Mottos: Sarvatra, Izzat-O-Iqbal (Everywhere with Honour and Glory)
- Colors: Red & Navy Blue
- Anniversaries: 15 April - Raising Day

Insignia
- Abbreviation: 71 Fd Regt

71 Field Regiment is part of the Regiment of Artillery of the Indian Army.

== Formation and history ==
The regiment was raised as 71 Medium Regiment on 15 April 1962 at Nasirabad. The first commanding officer was Lieutenant Colonel CV Advaney. The regiment was formed with a headquarter and two medium batteries (184 and 185) and equipped with 5.5 inch howitzers. The troops were taken from 10 Field Regiment, 15 Field Regiment and 144 Territorial Army Battalion. The third battery, 186 medium battery was raised during the 1965 war at Chawinda in Pakistan, which was then captured enemy territory.

== Class composition ==
The unit has a class composition of North Indian Brahmins. The regiment considers Parashurama, the Hindu warrior-god as its ideal.

== Operations ==
The regiment has taken part in the following operations:

- Indo-Pakistani War of 1965 – 185 battery took part in Operation Kabaddi in the Rann of Kutch. The regiment less 185 battery took part in Operation Ablaze in the Sialkot sector. It was part of the 1 Artillery Brigade under 1 Armoured Division and equipped with 5.5 inch guns. The regiment lost 8 men during the war. The regiment was awarded one Vir Chakra.
- Indo-Pakistani War of 1971 – Operation Cactus Lily
- Operation Blue Star and Operation Woodrose – 1983 - 1984
- Operation Trident – 1986
- Operation Meghdoot – 1989 – 1991
- Operation Vijay – 1999 – 2000
- Operation Rakshak – 2000 - 2001, 2007 – 2009.
- Operation Parakram – 2002

== Gallantry awards ==
The regiment has won the following gallantry awards–

- Vir Chakra – Havildar Ram Ujagar
- COAS Commendation Card –
  - Havildar Priyavart Sharma

== War cry ==
The war cry of the regiment is बोल बाबा परशुराम की जय (Bol Baba Parashurama Ki Jai), which translates to Victory to Baba Parashurama.

== Notable Officers ==
- Colonel Prithipal Singh Gill – He commanded the regiment during the 1965 war and had the unique distinction of serving in all three services.

== See also ==
- List of artillery regiments of Indian Army
