= 34 Field Regiment (India) =

Indian Army artillery unit

34 (Maratha) Field Regiment (Cassino II)
- Active: 1941 – present
- Country: India
- Allegiance: British India; India
- Branch: British Indian Army; Indian Army
- Type: Artillery
- Size: Regiment
- Motto(s): SARVATRA, IZZAT-O-IQBAL “Everywhere With Honour and Glory”.
- Colors: "Red & Navy Blue"
- Battle honours: Cassino-II (Italian Campaign - World War II)

Insignia
- Abbreviation: 34 Fd Regt (Cassino II)

34 Field Regiment (Cassino II) is part of the Regiment of Artillery of the Indian Army.

== History ==
=== Formation ===
The Regiment was raised as the 8th Battalion of the Fifth Maratha Light Infantry at Belgaum on February 1, 1941 under Lt Col LCM Bellamy, MC. During World War II, the regiment participated in a number of battles as 4 Maratha Anti Tank Regiment initially in Iraq and Egypt. It played a decisive role in the Italian Campaign against the Germans in Battle of Cassino in the 'Lir Valley Operation' theatre from 11-13 May 1944 which earned them the coveted Honour title of “Cassino-II” and one DSO, Two Military Cross and many other Gallantry medals.

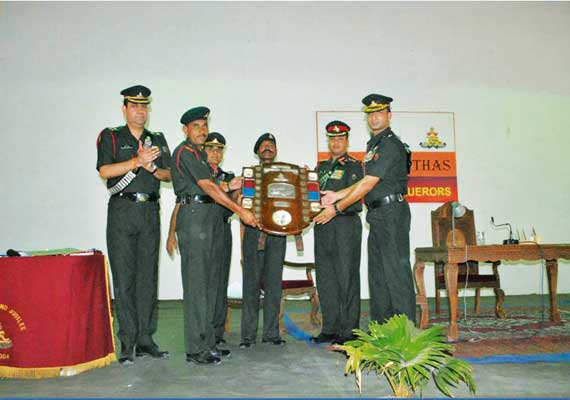
Cassino-II Battle Honour Day, 2013

=== Operations ===
Some of the major operations undertaken by the Regiment include:

World War II
The Regiment served in Iraq, Palestine, Egypt and Italy between 1942 and 1945. In Italy, the Regiment being a part of 8th Indian Division, during the 'Liri Valley Operations' carried their guns across the River Gari through ropeways and provided accurate and timely fire power which proved crucial in the Battle of Monte Cassino in 1944 and the Regiment was thereafter conferred with the Battle Honour of "Cassino-II".

Hyderabad Police Action - 1948
The Regiment which had become the first Self Propelled Indian Artillery Regiment in 1946 with the 17 Pounder Archers moved to Hyderabad in 1948 as part of 1 Armoured Division to quell an armed insurrection aimed against the formal union of this princely state with the Union of India.

Indo-Pakistani War of 1971
The Regiment (which had converted to a Medium Regiment in 1963) saw action in Uri, Tangdhar and Naushera sector of Jammu and Kashmir.

Post 1971

Lance Havildar Morey Santosh Bhagwan was awarded the Sena Medal in 2025. Lieutenant Colonel Abhimanyu Kumar Shah, Captain Virat Bakshi and Naib Subedar Chopadar Dattatray Baban were awarded COAS Commendation Cards during Operation Sindoor.

=== Equipment ===
The regiment has had the following guns in chronological order

- 18 Pounder Gun
- 17 Pounder Archer
- 5.5 Inch Gun
- M-46 130 mm Field Gun
- 160 mm Heavy Mortar
- 155 mm Soltam
- Indian Field Gun

== See also ==
- List of artillery regiments of Indian Army
