= Srinagar–Baramulla highway =

National highway in the Kashmir Valley, India

Srinagar Baramulla highway

Route information
- Maintained by National Highways Authority of India
- Length: 54 km (34 mi)
- History: Ancient

Major junctions
- From: Srinagar, Srinagar district
- To: Baramulla, Baramulla district

Location
- Country: India
- Major cities: Srinagar, Baramulla

Highway system
- Roads in India; Expressways; National; State; Asian

Srinagar Baramulla highway is the national highway and road in Kashmir valley that connects the municipal committee of Srinagar with Baramulla. The road distance between the two cities is 54 kilometres (34 mi) and minimum travel time is 55 minutes. Border Roads Organization is in the process of constructing new concrete bridges at places where the old army's iron bridges were constructed for the proper development of the road. The highway is part of National Highway 44 which is originally the road between Uri and Leh. The highway runs on approximately the same reduced level of around 1,700 metres (5,600 ft) above mean sea level. Jammu and Kashmir state road transport corporation provides transport facilities on the road every day on fixed time intervals for the convenience of the people traveling from Srinagar to Baramulla or vice versa. The road further stretches from the end terminus up to Muzaffarabad with an addition of 124 kilometres (77 mi).

== See also ==
- Jammu–Srinagar National Highway
