= Madrasi =

Ethnic slur and exonym

Madrasi (Prakrit: Madarasi), also spelled as Madrassi, Madrasee, or Madrassee, was a term used as a demonym for people from southern India, usually used by those from northern India and the Western world. More precisely, during the British Raj, it was an exonym to refer to the people of Madras Presidency, including the people of present-day Andhra Pradesh, Tamil Nadu, and parts of Karnataka and northern parts of Kerala, while the term Deccani was used to refer the people from Hyderabad State (present-day Telangana) and Kingdom of Mysore.

== Contemporary usage ==
In modern day, the term "Madrasi" is widely considered an inaccurate and often pejorative ethnic slur and stereotype. It homogenizes the diverse cultures, languages, and identities of over 250 million people in southern India. The use of the term is often seen as a form of generalization that ignores the distinct identities.

== See also ==
- Tamils
- Telugu vaaru
