= Regiment of Artillery (India) =

Artillery arm of the Indian Army

Regiment of the Artillery
- Regimental crest
- Active: 1827–present
- Country: India
- Allegiance: Republic of India
- Branch: Indian Army
- Type: Artillery
- Nickname: ARTY
- Mottos: Sarvatra Izzat-o-Iqbal (Everywhere with Honour and Glory)
- Regimental colors: Red and Navy Blue
- Anniversaries: 28 September (Gunners' Day)
- Decorations: Victoria Cross 1 Ashoka Chakra 1 Maha Vir Chakra 7 Kirti Chakra 8 Vir Chakra 92; Yudh Seva Medal 3 Shaurya Chakra 56; Sena Medal (Gallantry) 441

Commanders
- Senior Colonel Commandant Regiment of Artillery: Lt Gen N S Sarna PVSM, AVSM, SM, VSM
- Commandant School of Artillery: Lt Gen N S Sarna PVSM, AVSM, SM, VSM
- Notable commanders: General PP Kumaramangalam DSO, OBE; General OP Malhotra PVSM; General SF Rodrigues PVSM, VSM; General S Padmanabhan PVSM, AVSM, VSM; General Deepak Kapoor PVSM, AVSM, SM, VSM

Insignia
- Regimental Colors

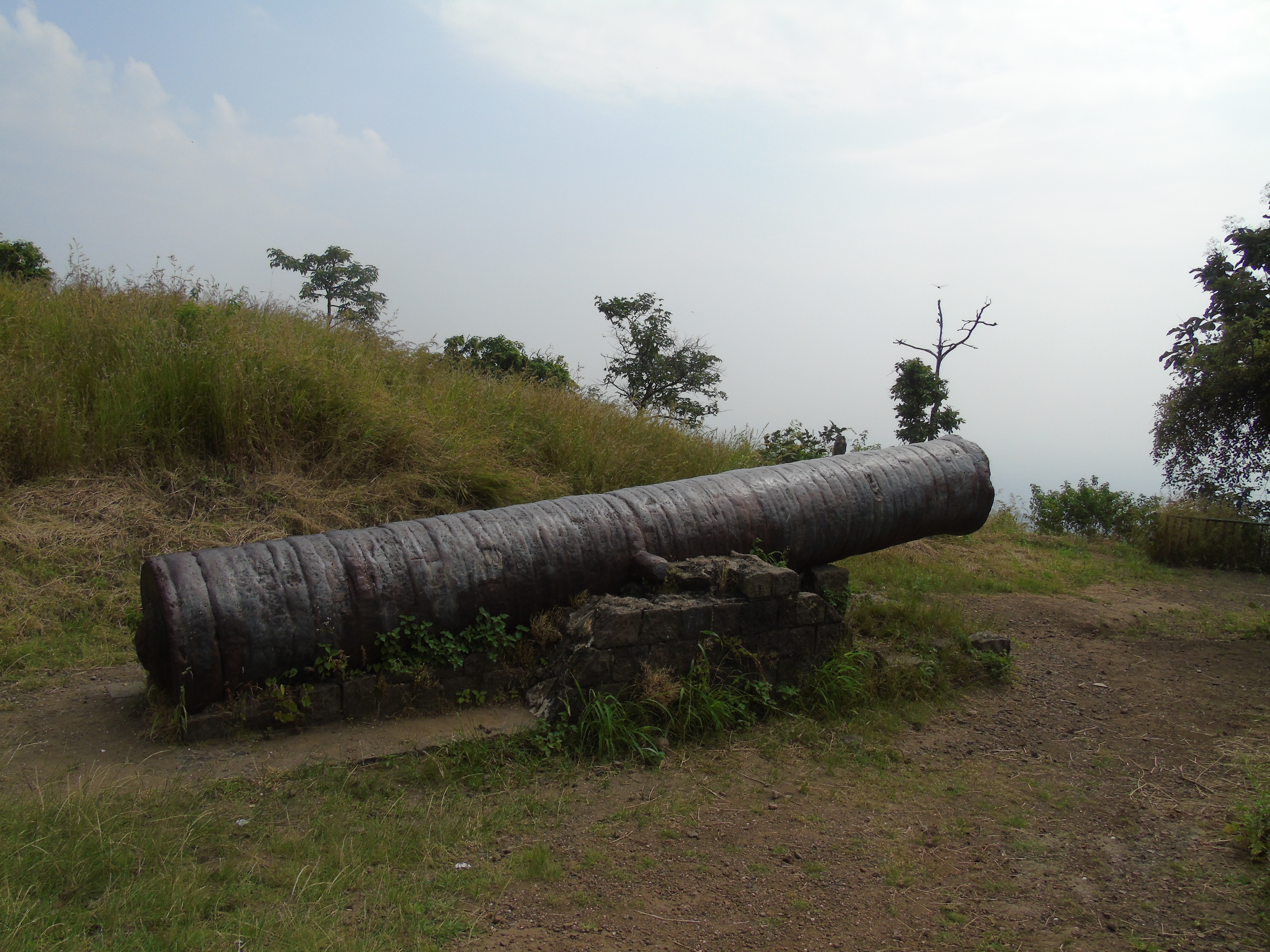
27 feet Cannon at Narnala fort

The Regiment of Artillery is a combat support arm of the Indian Army, which provides massive firepower during all ground operations of the Indian Army. It is a successor to the Royal Indian Artillery (RIA) of British Indian Army, which itself traces its origins to the formation of Bombay Artillery in 1827.

Today, it is the second-largest arm of the Indian Army, and with its guns, mortars, rocket launchers, unmanned aerial vehicles, surveillance systems, missiles and artillery firepower. It constitutes almost one-sixth of its total strength.

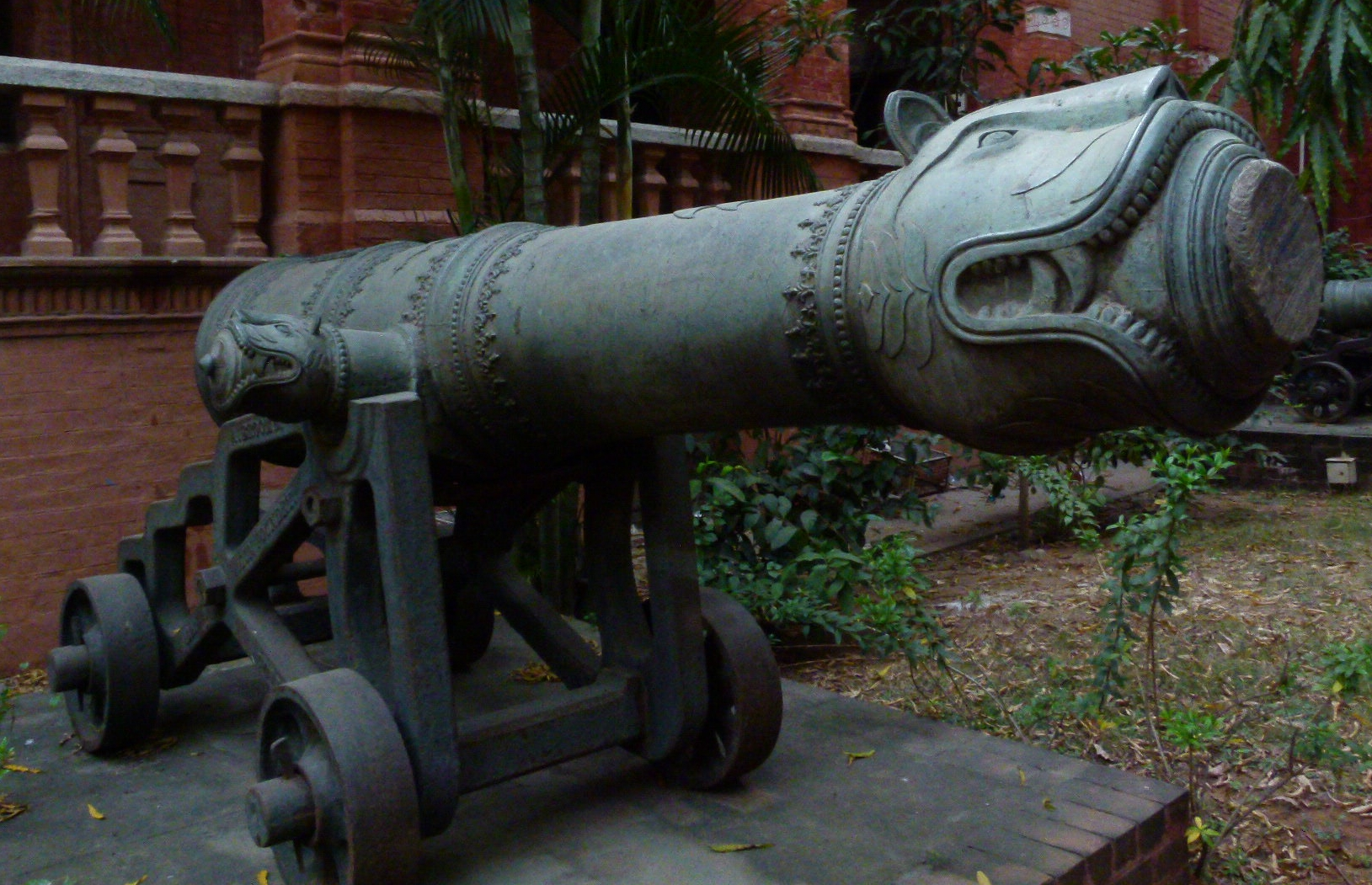
Cannon of Tipu Sultan at Government Museum, Chennai

== History ==
=== Early history ===
The Mughal Emperor Babur is popularly credited with introducing artillery to India, in the Battle of Panipat in 1526, where he decisively used gunpowder firearms and field artillery to defeat the much larger army of Ibrahim Lodhi, the ruler of the Delhi Sultanate, thus not just laying the foundation of the Mughal Empire but also setting a precedent for all future battles in the subcontinent. However, evidence of earlier use of guns by Bahmani kings in the battle of Adoni in 1368 and King Mohammed Shah of Gujarat in the fifteenth century have been recorded. Then came the Portuguese, who for the first time introduced the man-o-war (ships) armed with cannons and introduced the concept of command of the seas in the Indian Ocean region. However, it was documented by Portuguese travellers that artillery guns were widely in use in the Indian subcontinent. By the early 16th century, Zamorin, the ruler of Calicut, had begun to emulate the Portuguese and began to arm his ships with naval gun pieces.

The Mughals further expanded and improved their artillery arm and used it successfully to expand their empire. Though the artillery arm of the Marathas was weaker than many of their contemporaries, Balaji Baji Rao organised the arm in professional lines and Madhavji Sindhia established a fairly efficient gun manufacturing foundry under the supervision of European gun makers. During the 18th century, Tipu Sultan was notable for using guns, mortars, rockets and howitzers to effective use; the Nizam of Hyderabad manufactured his own guns with the help of his French officers and the Sikhs under Maharaja Ranjit Singh pioneered the development of horse-artillery on the same lines as that of the East India Company.

=== East India Company ===
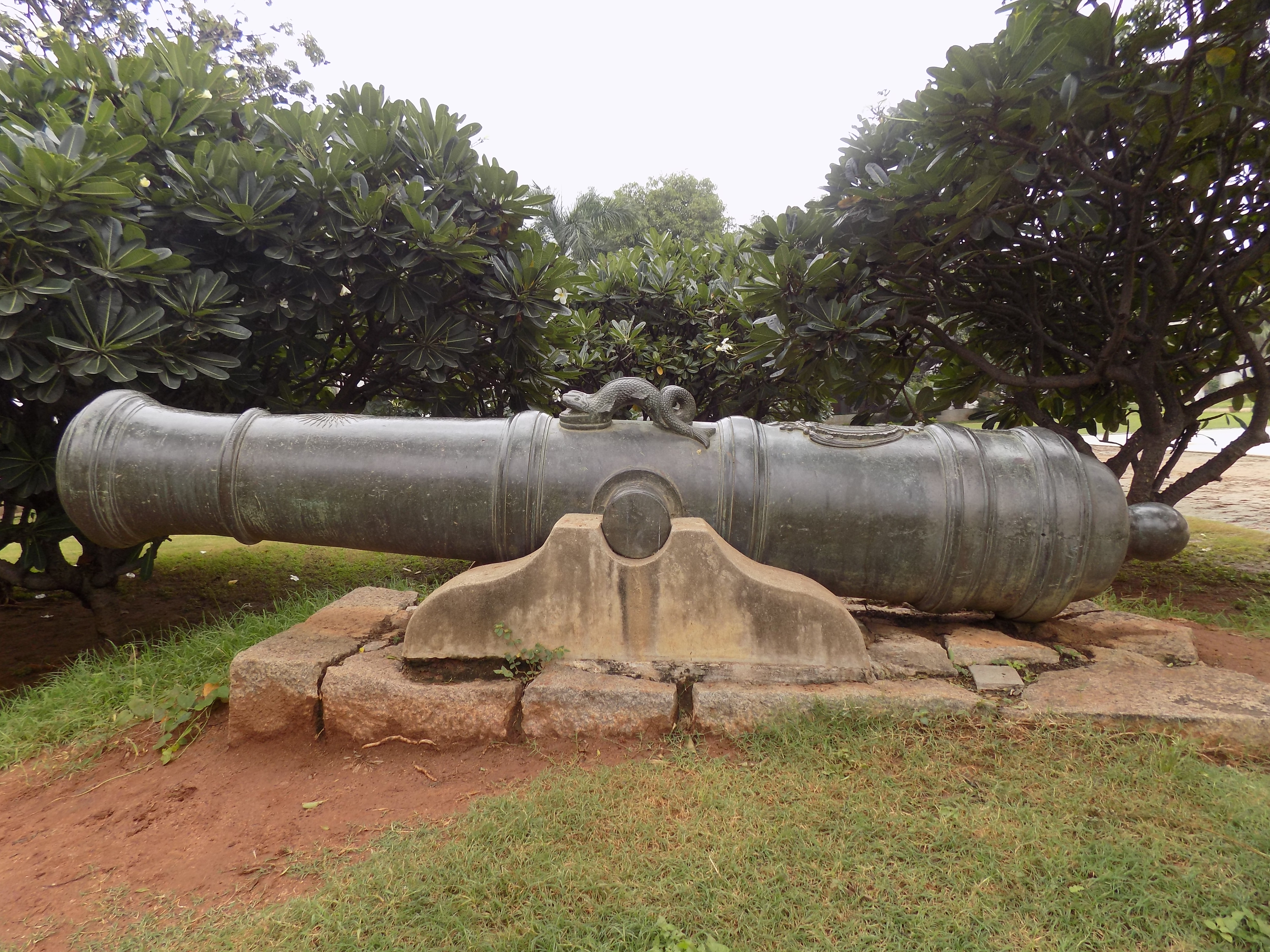
Nizam era brass cannon at Chowmahalla Palace Museum

The English, who were regular users of cannons in their ships, initially used guns landed from their fleet and manned by naval ratings detached for the purpose. They first placed 12 guns near the village of Armegaon along the Coromandel coast. The gunners were called Topasses from the Portuguese word Tope. In 1668, two companies of East India Company's artillery were formed at Bombay. The other presidencies followed suit. In 1748, the Court of Directors of the East India Company ordered regular companies of artillery to be formed, one at each for the Presidencies of Bengal, Madras, and Bombay. The power of artillery in defining the military power at that time was so pervasive that initially the British did not permit the natives to join the artillery arm. As the artillery was expanded, sufficient European recruits could not be mustered, the company gradually permitted the natives to join the artillery in a small percentage. These Indian gunners recruited as support staff were called as Golandaz, Gun Lashkars, Tindals and Serangs. A few Indian mountain artillery batteries, officered by the British, were raised in the 19th century and formed part of the Royal Artillery.

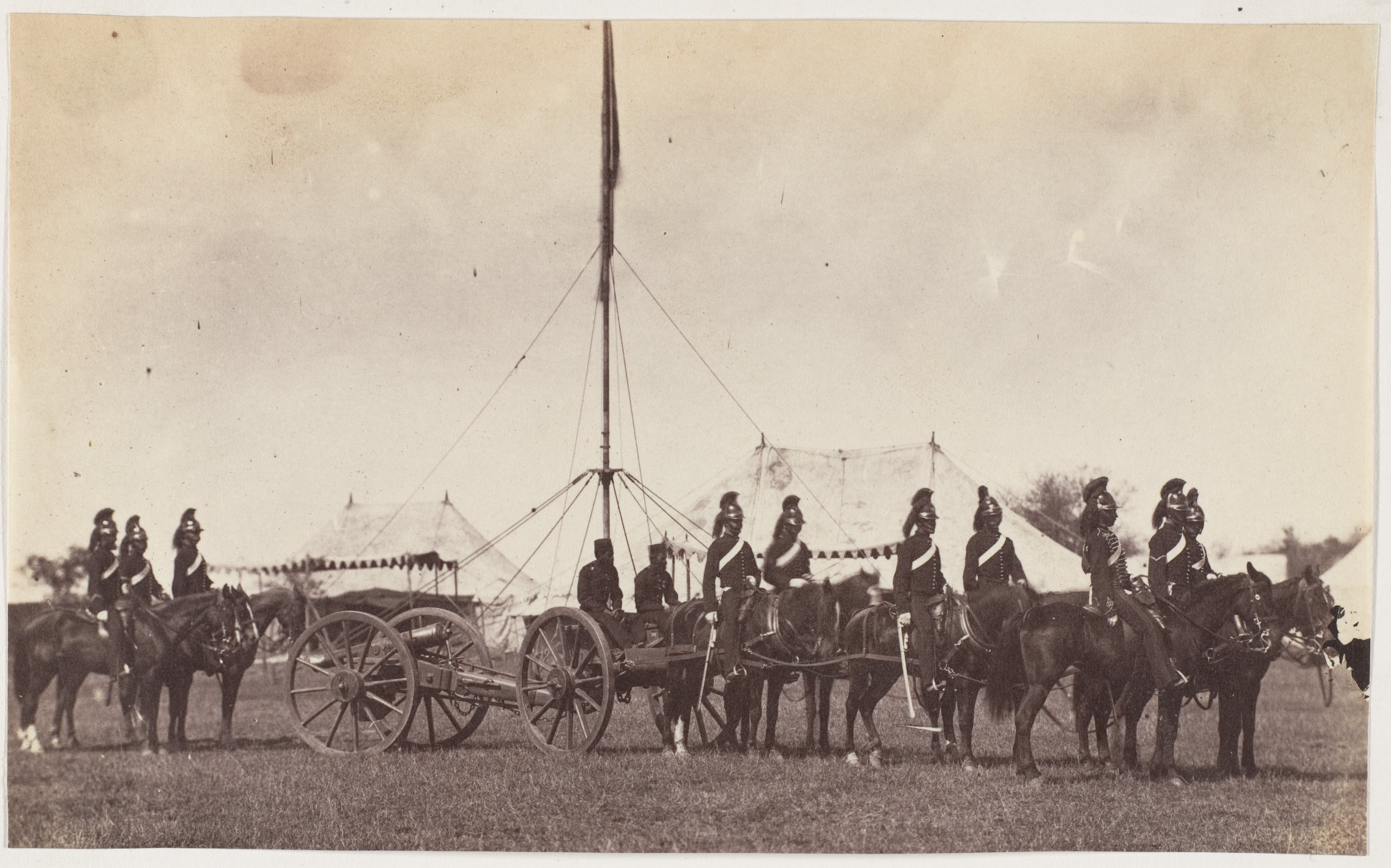
Bengal Horse Artillery, 1860

The Royal Indian Artillery (RIA) of the British Indian Army was raised on 28 September 1827, as a part of the Bombay Army, a presidency army of the Bombay Presidency. It was later renamed as 5 Bombay Mountain Battery. The Indian Rebellion of 1857 sparked off in Meerut on 10 May 1857. Many of the Indian personnel of the Bengal Artillery were involved in the mutiny and the three battalions of foot artillery then in existence were all disbanded in 1862. Subsequently, all Indian artillery units were disbanded except for a few. The whole of the variously European artillery and the corps of engineers were transferred to the Royal corps under special conditions. The mutiny of all the native Bengal artillery, and other weighty considerations, had decided the Government to have no native field artillery in future. All the native artillery was therefore gradually disbanded. The only exceptions to this rule were the four mountain batteries in the Punjab Irregular Force (later the Punjab Frontier Force), and two native batteries in Bombay. These Nos. 1 and 2 companies Golandaz, originally used to garrison Aden and man the Jacobabad mountain train in turn, eventually became Nos. 1 and 2 Bombay Mountain Batteries, and later 5 and 6 (Bombay) Mountain Batteries. Another exception were the four field batteries of the Hyderabad Contingent. The whole of this contingent had done excellent service in 1857, and was retained intact. In future, with these exceptions, the artillery service in India was to be found by batteries and companies of the Royal Artillery. Many of the mountain batteries had soldiers from the disbanded horse artillery regiments of the Sikhs. They saw extensive action in the North West Frontier and the Afghan wars.

=== Crown service ===
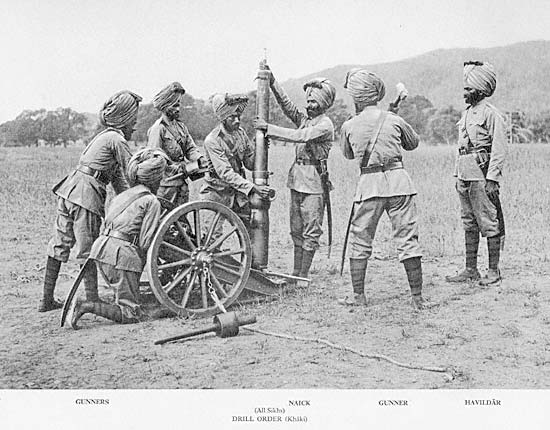
A mountain artillery crew from the British Indian Army demonstrating assembly of the RML 2.5 inch mountain gun, ca 1895

With nearly all of the field artillery being manned by the Royal Artillery, Indian soldiers were restricted to few native drivers of the horse, field and heavy batteries. These men are enlisted from the usual fighting classes of the Punjab. The main Indian representation was in the 'Mountain Artillery'. The guns of the mountain artillery were light in calibre and were designed to be disassembled and transported by pack mule in up to eight loads for use in terrain that would otherwise be impossible to traverse with larger and more conventional artillery. The earliest guns were the tiny 3 Pounder SBML (Smooth Bore Muzzle Loading) and 4 2/5 Inch SBML howitzer of 1850s.

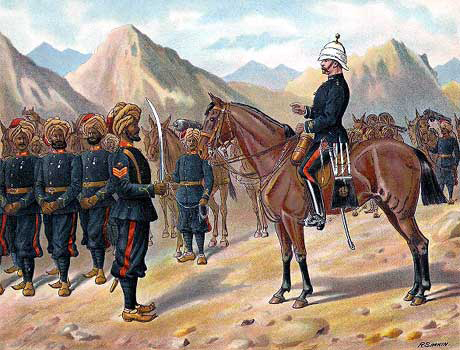
A chromolithograph of No. 1 Kohat Mountain Battery by Richard Simkin, c. 1896.

These were replaced in 1865 by the 7-pounder RML (rifled muzzle loading) gun and this in turn was replaced in 1879 by the significantly improved and significantly heavier RML 2.5-inch mountain gun, also known as Kipling's Screw Gun – which had barrels that split in two for transport.

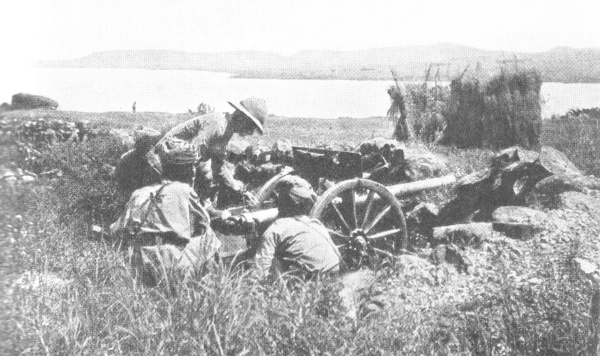
BL 10-pounder mountain gun crew in action, East Africa, World War I

For the Great War, the 10 Pounder BL (Breech Loading) and 2.75 Inch guns equipped the Indian Mountain Artillery. Only in the last year of the war was the next model, the QF 3.7-inch mountain howitzer introduced in East Africa. Upon entering service, it immediately became clear that this piece was vastly superior to all previous models, and it would soldier on as the standard mountain gun during the inter-war years and throughout World War II.

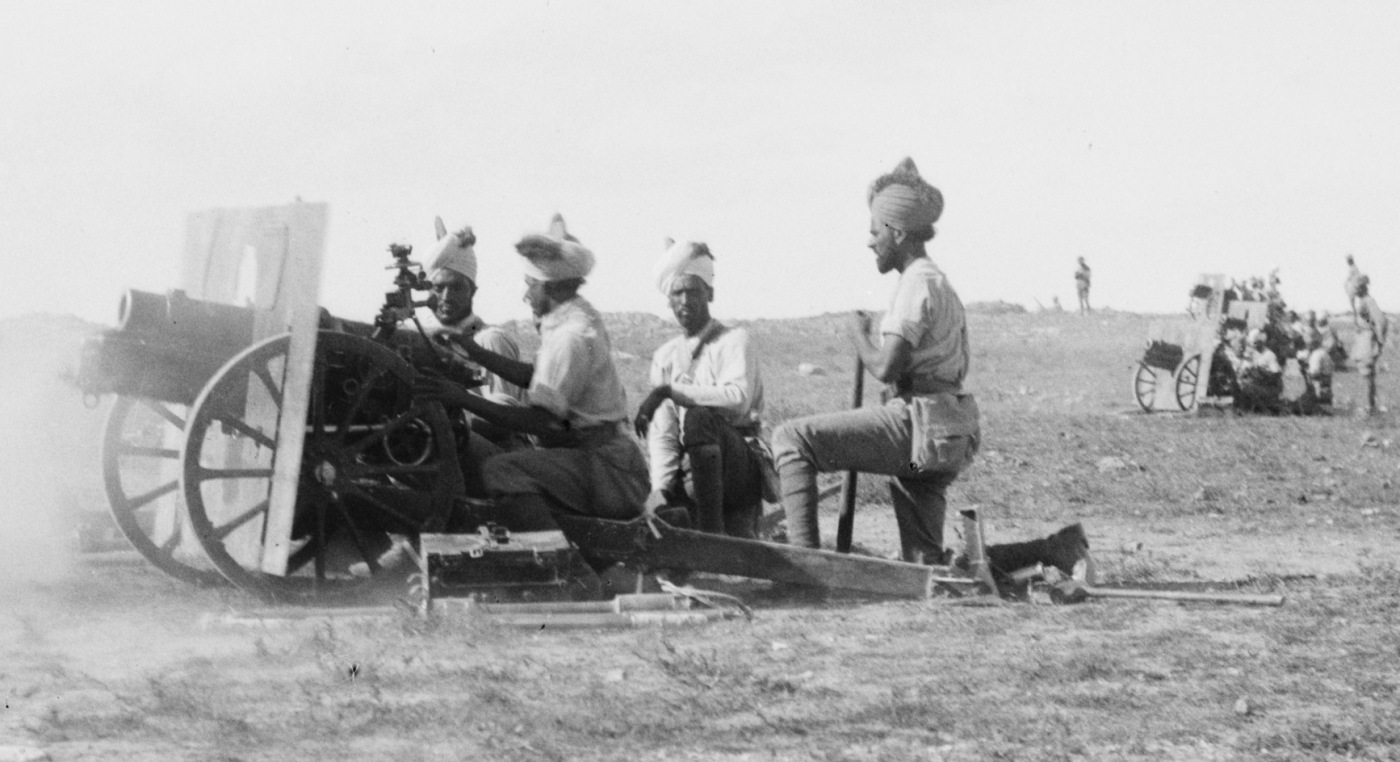
Indian Army gunners with QF 3.7 inch mountain howitzers in Palestine, 1917

Other than the batteries which were not disbanded after the mutiny, throughout the remainder of the 19th Century, and during the years leading up to and including the Great War, a total of twenty-five more Batteries were raised. All the Indian mountain batteries consisted of Punjabis, half Muhammadan and half Hindu, the latter being almost entirely Sikhs. The gunners were specially selected for their height and strength, with a view to the rapid assembling and dismantling of the guns from off and on to the backs of the powerful mules that carry them. In addition to service on the 'Frontier', Indian Mountain Batteries served in North-East India, Burma, Afghanistan, Tibet, the Middle East, Africa, and during the Great War; Mesopotamia, Gallipoli, East Africa, Persia, Palestine and of course the North-West Frontier again. Throughout their history, the reputation of Indian Mountain Batteries was enhanced by the fact that they were officered by the very best the Royal Artillery had to offer. Such talented men competed to join because a tour in an Indian Mountain Battery, unlike other branches of artillery, virtually guaranteed seeing active service. Indian officers (VCO's) and other ranks were also the best available, as the relatively small number of batteries and their role as the only Indian artillery meant that there was always a surplus of volunteers, and this in turn meant that only the highest quality of recruit was accepted. During the Great War, Indian gunners won 12 Order of British India, 22 Indian Order of Merit, 150 Indian Distinguished Service Medals, 232 Indian Meritorious Service Medals, 2 Médaille militaire, 3 Crucea Servicul Credincois (Romanian), 5 Serbian Gold Medals, 4 Cross of St. George, 4th Class and 1 Cross of St George, 3rd Class.

=== Indianisation of Artillery ===
After the decision to Indianise the artillery arm in India, it was decided to raise three field artillery brigades and one horse artillery battery for the infantry divisions and the cavalry brigade respectively. On 15 January 1935, 'A' Field Brigade was formed to take the place of an outgoing British Field Brigade. It consisted of four batteries – the 1st of Madrasis, originally formed from the disbanded Madras Pioneers, the 2nd, Punjabi Mussalmans, the 3rd, Rajputana Rajputs and the 4th Ranghars. In the following year, an Indian Artillery Training Battery was added to the establishment of the Field Artillery Training Centre at Mathura. In March 1938, a decision to enhance the number of Indian Artillery units was taken by the Commander-in-Chief, India. Indian officers were inducted in the No. 1 Indian Mountain Artillery Brigade, followed by the replacement of a second British Field Brigade by an Indian Field Brigade. Thereafter, replacement of a British Heavy Battery (Coast Artillery) and one British Anti-aircraft Battery by an Indian Heavy Anti-aircraft Battery were to be undertaken followed by the replacement of a second British Heavy Anti-aircraft Battery by an Indian Heavy Anti-aircraft Battery.

Branches other than the field artillery were also introduced.

- In August 1924, a survey section of the Royal Artillery was grouped under Captain EB Culverwell, MC, at the School of Artillery, Kakul.
- Medium artillery, (Note: Medium Guns include those of greater than 105 mm calibre, but less than 155 mm and howitzers of greater than 105 mm calibre up to and including 155 mm) became a part of the Regiment of Indian Artillery on 15 August 1944, when an Indian independent medium battery was raised at Peshawar to relieve a British Medium Battery in its frontier defence role. This battery was designated 201 (Independent) Medium Battery on 26 August 1944. The first of the Indian medium regiments was formed by converting the 8 Indian Field Regiment on 1 October 1944. This Regiment is in service and is known as 40 Field Regiment.
- Air observation post (Air OP), a special artillery unit under Royal Indian Air Force (RIAF) control was raised during the World War II. The air observation post first came to Indian Artillery in the form of 656 Air OP Squadron RAF, which arrived on 14 November 1943. Artillery officers trained as pilots flew light unarmed Taylorcraft Auster aircraft to correct artillery gun fire and provide battle related information. 1 Air OP Flight (RIAF), the first in the Indian Army was raised on 15 August 1947.

=== Second World War ===
During the Second World War, Indian artillery units saw action in Malaya, Burma, East and North Africa, the Middle East and Italy. The following units saw action –

- Italy – 4 Maratha Anti Tank Regiment
- East Africa – 22 Mountain Battery, 1 (Jammu and Kashmir) Mountain Battery

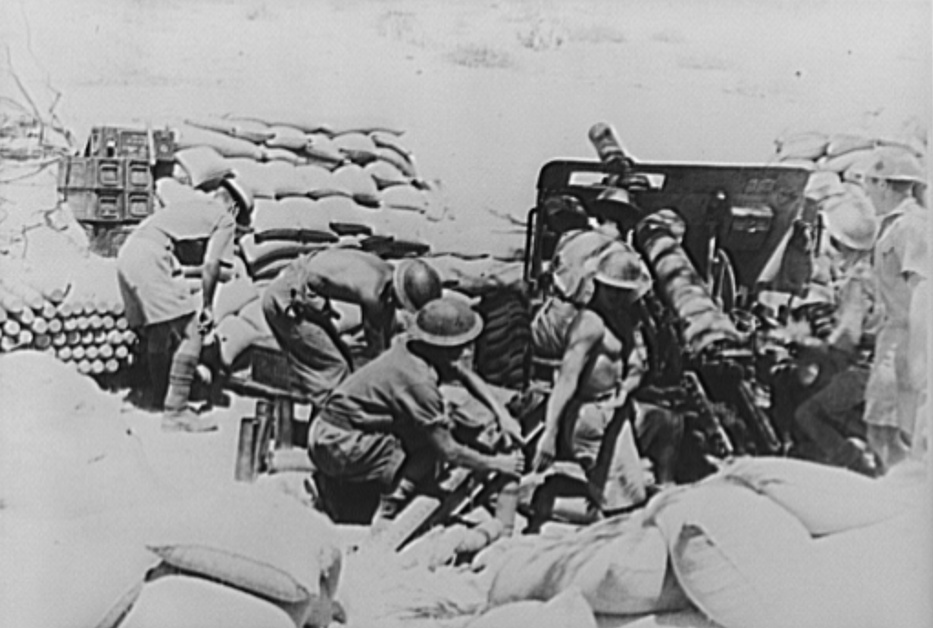
Indian soldiers in action before the capture of Keren in Eritrea, 1941

- Syria – 1 (Jammu and Kashmir) Mountain Battery
- Aden – 27 and 18 Indian Mountain Batteries
- Iraq – 1 Indian Anti-tank Regiment, 4 Maratha Anti Tank Regiment
- North Africa – 2 Indian Field Regiment
- Malaya – 22 Mountain Regiment
- Burma –
  - 1 Indian Field Regiment, 2 Indian Field Regiment, 4 Indian Field Regiment, 5 Indian Field Regiment, 7 Indian Field Regiment
  - 20 Indian Mountain Regiment, 21 Indian Mountain Regiment, 23 Mountain Regiment, 24 Mountain Regiment, 25 Indian Mountain Regiment, 30 Indian Mountain Regiment, 33 Mountain Regiment
  - 1 Indian Anti-tank Regiment, 5 (Maratha) Anti-tank Regiment, 7 Indian Anti-tank Regiment, 8 (Maratha) Anti-tank Regiment
  - 1 Indian Survey Regiment
  - 1 Light Anti-aircraft Regiment, 2 Light Anti-aircraft Regiment, 5 Indian Heavy Anti-aircraft Regiment

By the end of Second World War, Indian gunners had won one Victoria Cross, One George Medal, 15 Military Crosses, two IOMs, 22 IDSMs, 18 Military Medals, five OBEs, One MBE, three BEMs, 13 Burma Gallantry Medals and 467 Jangi Inams. In acknowledgement of their contribution, Indian Artillery earned the coveted title of `Royal' in 1945. Though originally called the 'Indian Regiment of Artillery', it later became 'The Regiment of Indian Artillery' on 1 November 1940 and 'Royal Regiment of Indian Artillery' in October 1945, after its success in World War II. The title 'Royal' was dropped when India became a Republic on 26 January 1950.

=== Post Independence ===
At the time of independence, Indian Artillery consisted of Field, Medium, Air Defence, Counter Bombardment, Coastal, Air Observation Post and Survey branches. After the partition of India in 1947, the Royal Indian Artillery was divided with India being allotted eighteen and a half regiments while remaining nine and half units went to Pakistan. Artillery units have taken part and showed their prowess in the Indo-Pakistani War of 1947–1948, Sino-Indian War of 1962, Indo-Pakistani War of 1965, Indo-Pakistani War of 1971 and the Kargil War.

A major restructuring of Indian Artillery took place after the Chinese Aggression of 1962. This included fresh raising and induction of newer equipment. In 1964, Coastal Artillery was handed over to Indian Navy. In its peace time duties, the Regiment undertakes infantry type and counter insurgency tasks in Jammu and Kashmir and in the North Eastern States. Air Observation Post and Air Defence branches bifurcated in 1986 and 1994 respectively and formed new arms of Indian Army – Army Aviation Corps and Corps of Army Air Defence.

== Culture ==
=== Crest ===
Regimental Crest

The crest of the Regiment of Artillery is largely a legacy of the Royal Artillery. Their heraldic crest depicted a field gun with a crown above it, separated by the word Ubique (Latin for everywhere). Below the gun was emblazoned the motto; Quo Fas Et Gloria Ducunt (where right and glory lead). In the Royal Indian Artillery, the crown was replaced by star – representing the Star of India and instead of Ubique, the crest carried the word India to distinguish the Royal Indian Artillery from the Royal Artillery. The motto below was also changed to Izzat-o-Iqbal. After independence, the word India was dropped from the regimental crest and replaced with Sarvatra.

The gun in the crest, the same used in the crest of the Royal Artillery, is a homage to the gunners of the old kingdoms of India and in the regiments of artillery of the Royal Indian Artillery, whose traditions are carried on by the current Regiment of Artillery.

=== Motto ===
The motto of the Regiment of Artillery is Sarvatra Izzat-o-Iqbal (Everywhere with Honour and Glory), the Hindustani equivalent of the Royal Artillery motto Ubique Quo Fas Et Gloria Ducunt (Everywhere that Right and Glory Lead). The Hindustani motto honours the memory of the Hindu and Muslim gunners of the British Indian Army. The motto, Izzat-o-Iqbal, was retained but not without controversy. In 1954, as part of the process of Indianisation of the armed forces, the government ordered that regimental mottos be changed to Hindi or Sanskrit. The final decision was, however, left with the then Chief of the Army Staff, General Rajendra Sinhji. The Regiment of Artillery made a forceful case for retaining its motto, as it was felt the most suitable in content and meaning. It was finally decided to retain the motto, though it was in Persian, in time for the 1957 double celebrations of the centennial of the Indian Rebellion and the 150th sequicentennial anniversary of the Indian Artillery.

=== Flag and Colours ===
Flag of Indian Army Regiment of Artillery

A distinctive red and navy blue background the official colours of the Artillery flag forms an ideal setting for the golden gun (the Gunner crest) which forms the centrepiece of the flag. Gunner folklore had it, that the red and blue represents the flash and the smoke of the gun, though this is not quite true. Red has been traditionally common to all combat arms – Infantry, Armour and Artillery. The blue in the Artillery flag was taken from the ribbon of the 'Star of India' which had been incorporated into the Artillery crest. The original colour was light blue, but since a similar shade was adopted by the Corps of Signals, it was changed to navy blue to avoid confusion.

While the Artillery Regiments carry navy blue and burgundy red President's Banners, the guns are regarded as the regimental colours and are accorded the same compliments as the Standards, Guidons and Colours of the Cavalry and Infantry and the Banners of the Light Infantry and Services and Corps.

=== Raising day (Gunner's Day) ===
5 (Bombay) Mountain Battery, the first unit of the Indian Regiment of Artillery, was raised on 28 September 1827 as the 8th Company of the Golandaz battalion, Bombay Foot Artillery. This also marked the raising of the first native artillery unit and is celebrated as the day of raising of the Indian Regiment of Artillery. The battery is presently part of the 57 Field Regiment.

=== Composition ===
As in many pre-independence regiments, many of the units have been allotted on the basis of regional, historical or class/caste backgrounds – e.g. Sikhs, Ahirs, Dogras, Rajputs, Jats, Brahmins, Gurkhas, Marathas and SICs (South Indian Classes).

=== Women in the Regiment of Artillery ===
In the year 2023, it was decided to allow the entry of women officers in the Regiment of Artillery. In April 2023, five women officers who had passed out from Officers Training Academy, Chennai, joined their respective units.

=== Commemorative Postal Stamps ===
Commemorative stamps have been released were released by India Post depicting field artillery, a gunner and howitzer from Mountain Battery on the Golden Jubilee of the Regiment of Artillery and on the 50th anniversary of the 9 (Parachute) Field Regiment.

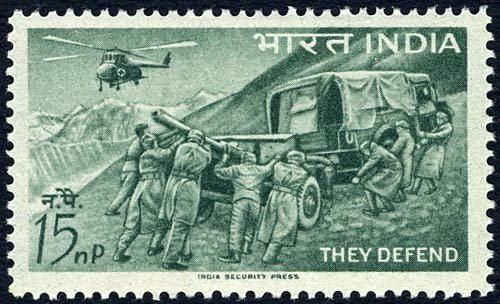
Field artillery (1963)

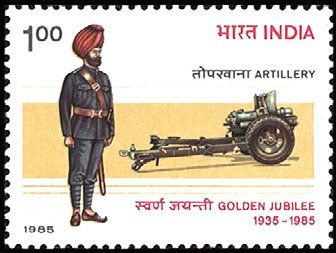
Golden Jubilee (1985)

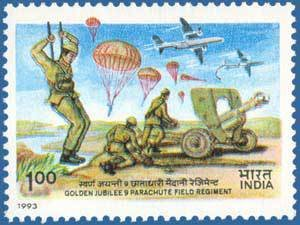
9th Parachute Field Artillery Regiment – 50th Anniversary (1993)

== School and Centre ==
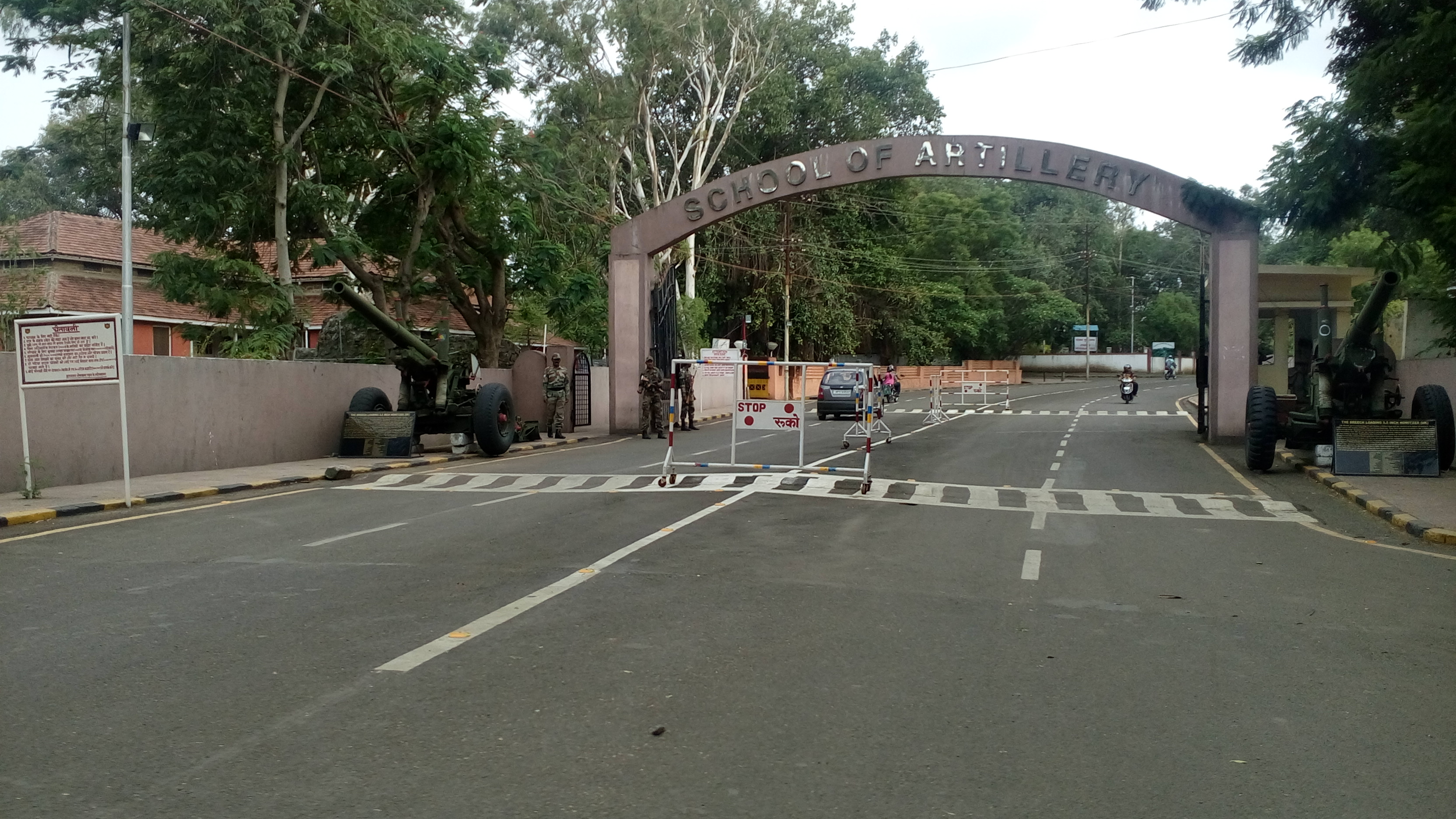
School of Artillery, Deolali

The School of Artillery is the premier institution for imparting training to the officers of the regiment. In pre-Independent India, the school was established in Kakul in 1918. In 1941, the present school was established at Deolali in Nashik district of Maharashtra. The Anti – Aircraft School at Karachi was also moved to Deolali and merged with the School of Artillery as one of its Wings in 1947. The Coastal Artillery Wing of the School, which was located at Bombay, was handed over to the Indian Navy in 1965. The Air Defence Wing, after bifurcation, has moved to Gopalpur in Orissa and has been renamed as the Air Defence and Guided Missile School (now Army Air Defence College). The air observation post wing was renamed as Aviation Wing in Jan 1982. Combat Army Aviation Training School (CAATS) was established in April 2004 and the Aviation Wing of the School was completely amalgamated with the CAATS in May 2004.

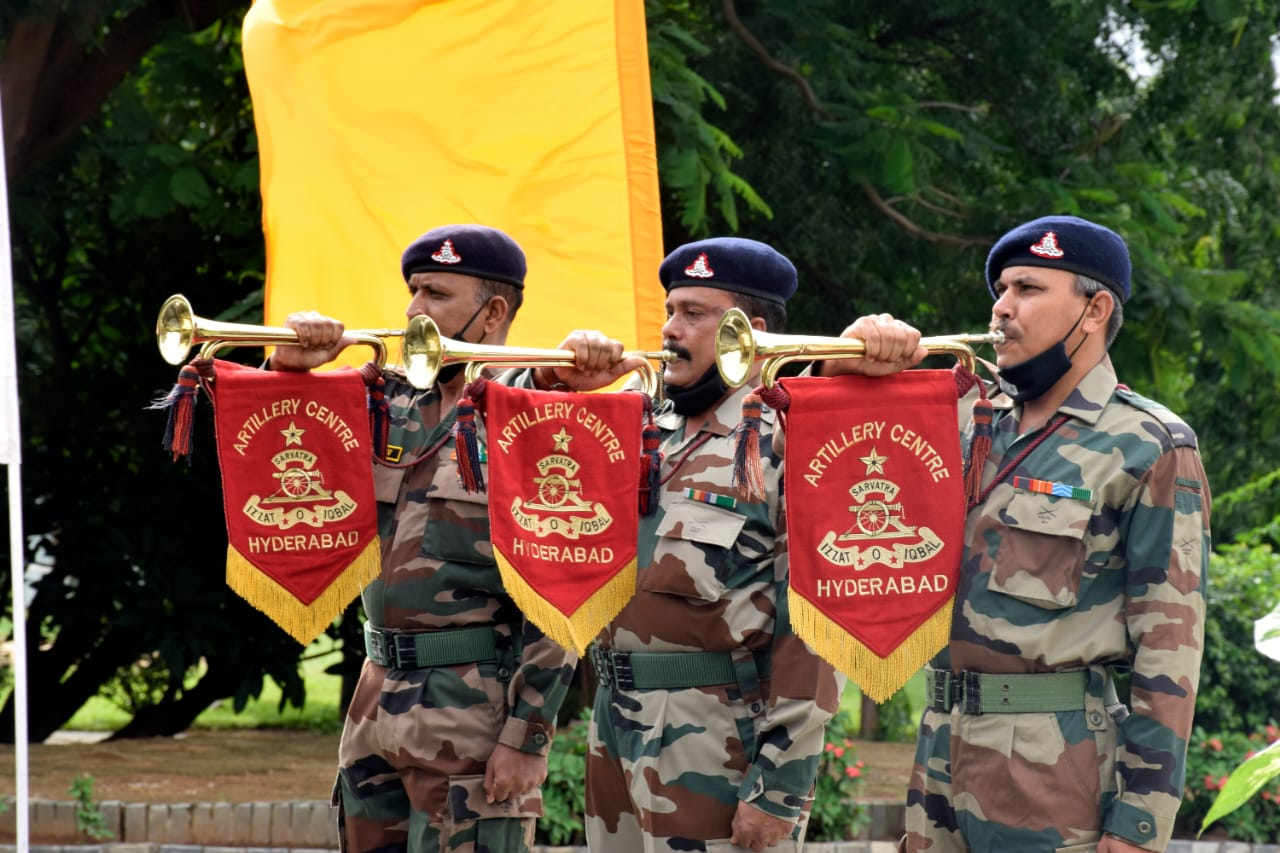
195th Gunners' Day Celebration at Golconda Artillery Centre, Hyderabad, 28 September 2021

The Mountain Artillery Training Centre came into being at Dehradun in August 1920 moving to Lucknow in October 1921 and in 1928 to Ambala. The Field Artillery Training Centre came up at Mathura. By 1947, there were six separate training centres, which were amalgamated to form the Royal Indian Artillery Centre (North). On 7 April 1948, the 'Royal' prefix was dropped and the Nasik centre was the sole remaining centre. At present there are two Artillery Training Centres – the Centre at Nashik Road, Maharashtra has the capacity to train 3,000-4,000 recruits at any given time. The other centre is at Golconda in Hyderabad, Telangana which came into being on August 15, 1962. The Golconda centre has three training regiments and presently trains 2900 recruits at a time. The Regiment of Artillery Museum, Artillery Records and Artillery Depot are located in Nashik Road.

== Units ==
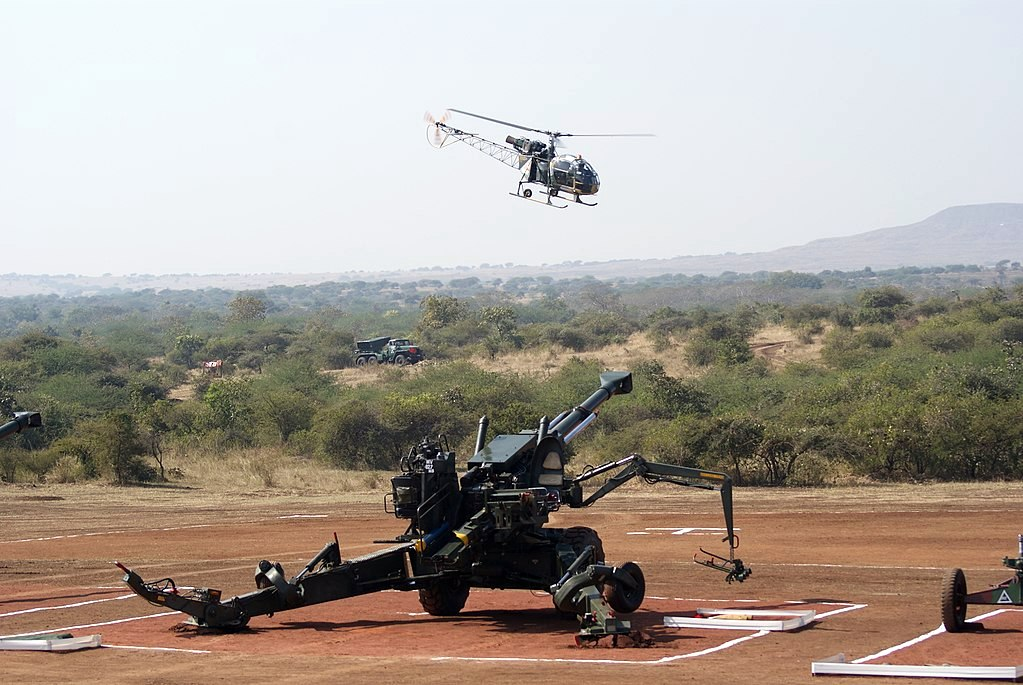
Dhanush (howitzer)

Artillery regiments can be Light Regiments, Medium Regiments, Field Regiments, Missile Regiments, Rocket Regiments and SATA (Surveillance & Target Acquisition) Regiments, depending on the nature of guns or equipment. There are two Airborne Artillery Regiments – 9 (Parachute) Field Regiment and 17 (Parachute) Field Regiment. Self-propelled artillery regiments carry the (SP) suffix to their names.

An Artillery Regiment is commanded by an officer of the rank of Colonel. His second in command (2IC) is a of a Lieutenant Colonel rank. Most regiments have four batteries. In addition to the headquarter battery, the regiment has three batteries (a section of guns), each commanded by officers of the rank of Major or Captain (called Battery Commanders). The three batteries are numbered and may be also designated as P, Q and R batteries. Each battery has six guns or missile launchers. Officers and other ranks from service arms, viz Army Medical Corps and Electronics and Mechanical Engineers also form part of the unit.

Three to four regiments are grouped to form a Brigade – which is part of Infantry or Armoured and recently Artillery Divisions. Independent Brigades are under Corps or Commands. Since the 1990s, three Artillery Divisions have been raised –

- 40 Artillery Division (Deep Strikers Division) – Ambala, Haryana, under II Corps of Western Command
- 41 Artillery Division (Agnibaaz Division) – Pune, Maharashtra, under XXI Corps of Southern Command
- 42 Artillery Division (Strategic Strikers Division) – Bassi, Rajasthan, under I Corps of South Western Command

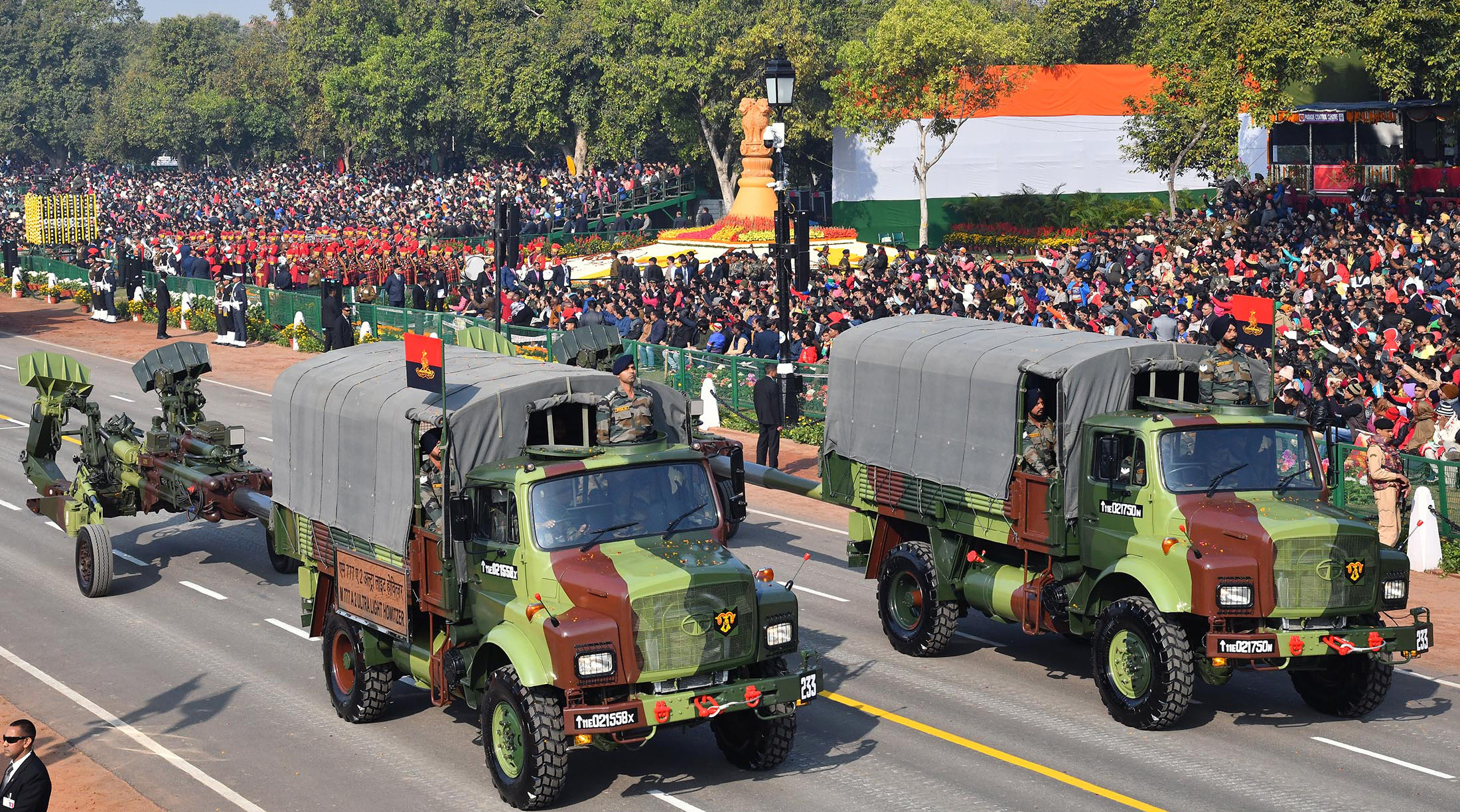
M777 howitzer

== Equipment ==
Light Artillery (Mortars)

- 120 mm E1 Light Mortar

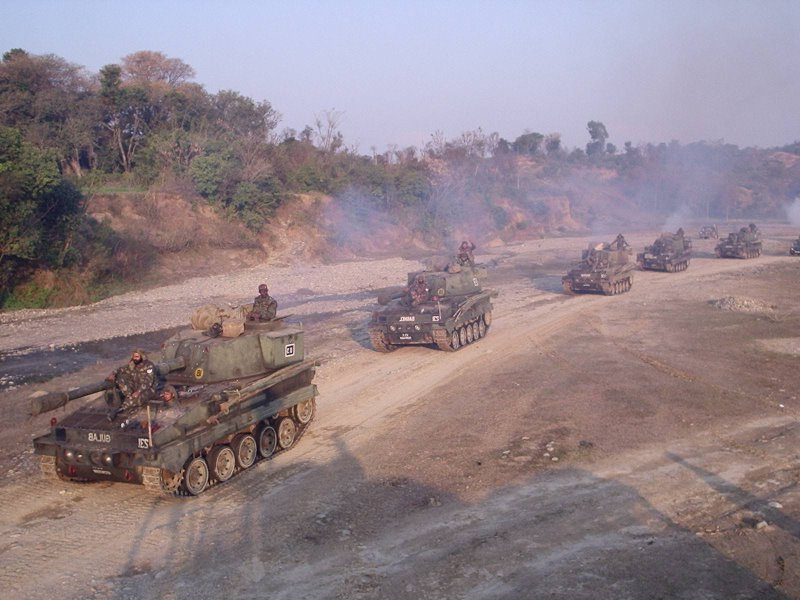
FV433 Abbot SPG (self-propelled artillery)

Field Artillery

- 105 mm Indian Field Gun and Light Field Gun

Medium Artillery

- 130 mm M-46 Field Gun; including 155 mm upgraded versions – by Soltam Systems and by Ordnance Factory Board (Sharang)
- 155 mm Haubits FH77/B Howitzer
- 155 mm Dhanush (howitzer)
- 155 mm M777 howitzer

By 2040, all medium artillery regiments will be converted to 155 mm standard. This is part of Field Artillery Rationalisation Plan (FARP), cleared in 1999.

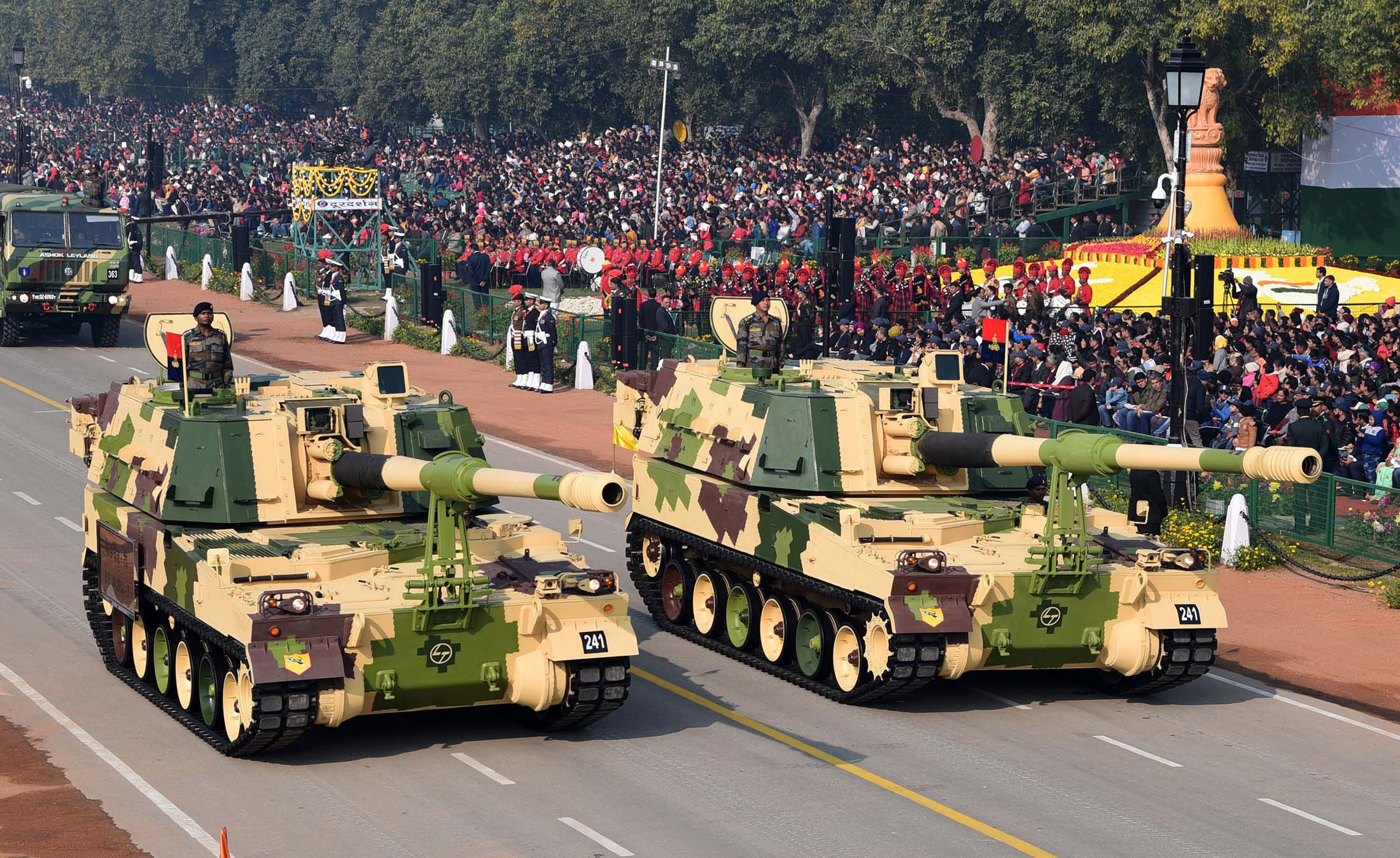
K9 Vajra

Self-propelled Artillery

- 155 mm K9 Vajra

Rocket Artillery

- 122 mm BM-21 Grad Multiple Barrel Rocket Launcher (Agnibaan)
- 214 mm Pinaka Multi Barrel Rocket Launcher
- 300 mm BM-30 Smerch Multiple Barrel Rocket Launcher

Missile Artillery

- Brahmos Missile System

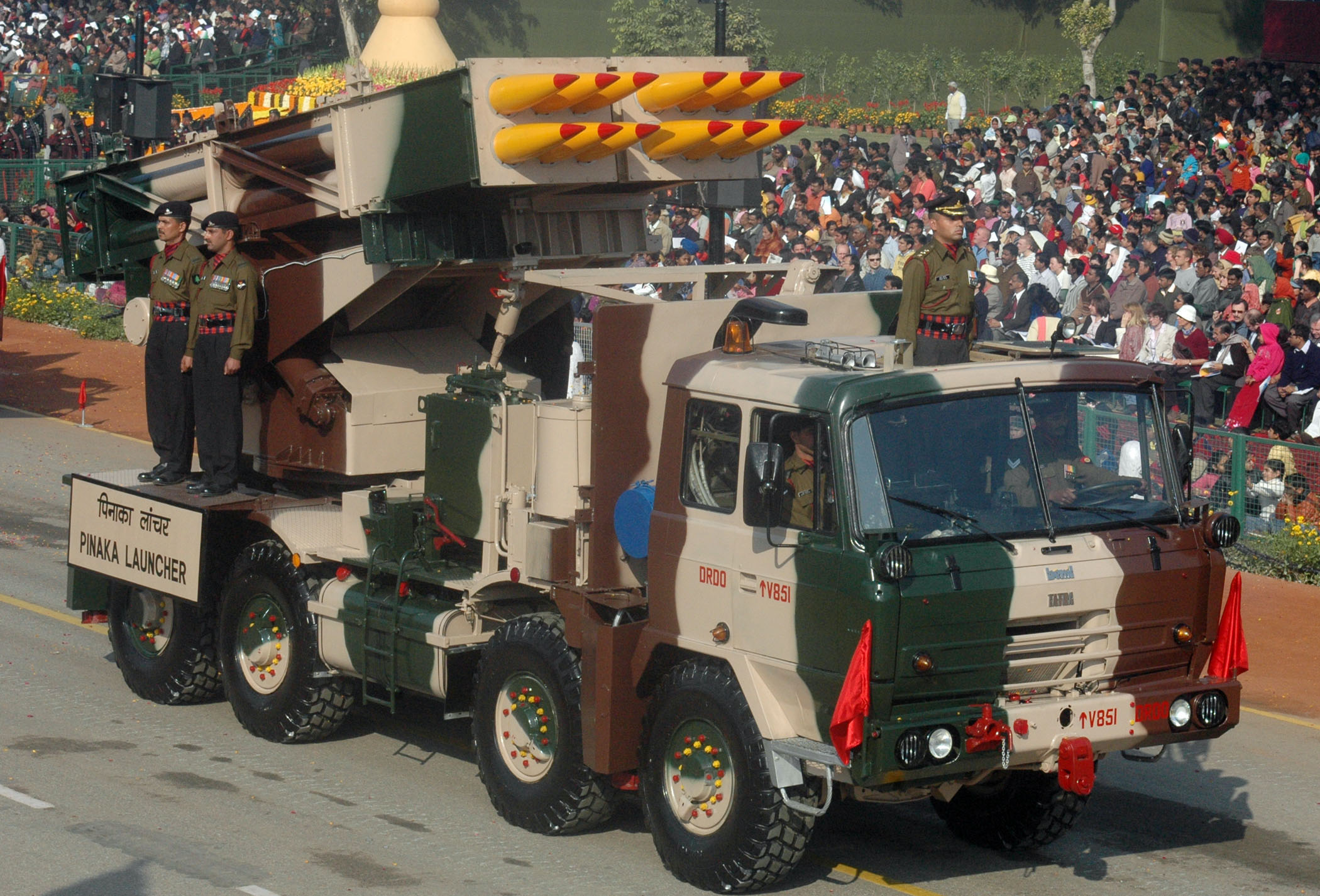
Pinaka Multi Barrel Rocket Launcher

Surveillance & Target Acquisition

- WLR (Weapons Locating Radar) System
- LORROS (Long Range Reconnaissance and Observation Systems)
- MBFSR (Medium Range Battlefield Surveillance Radar) System

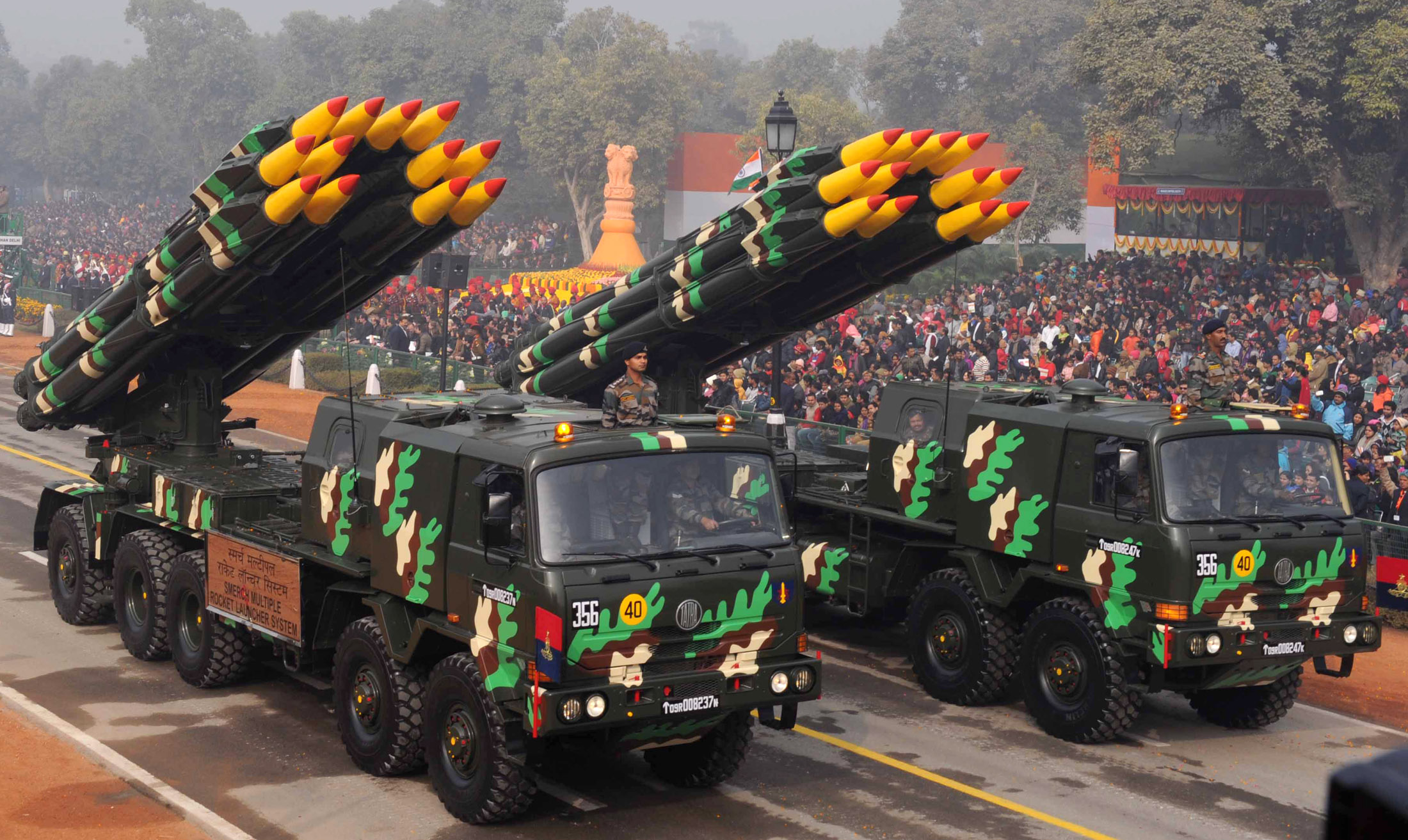
Smerch Multiple Rocket Launcher System

Command and control

- Artillery Combat Command and Control System

== Notable personnel ==
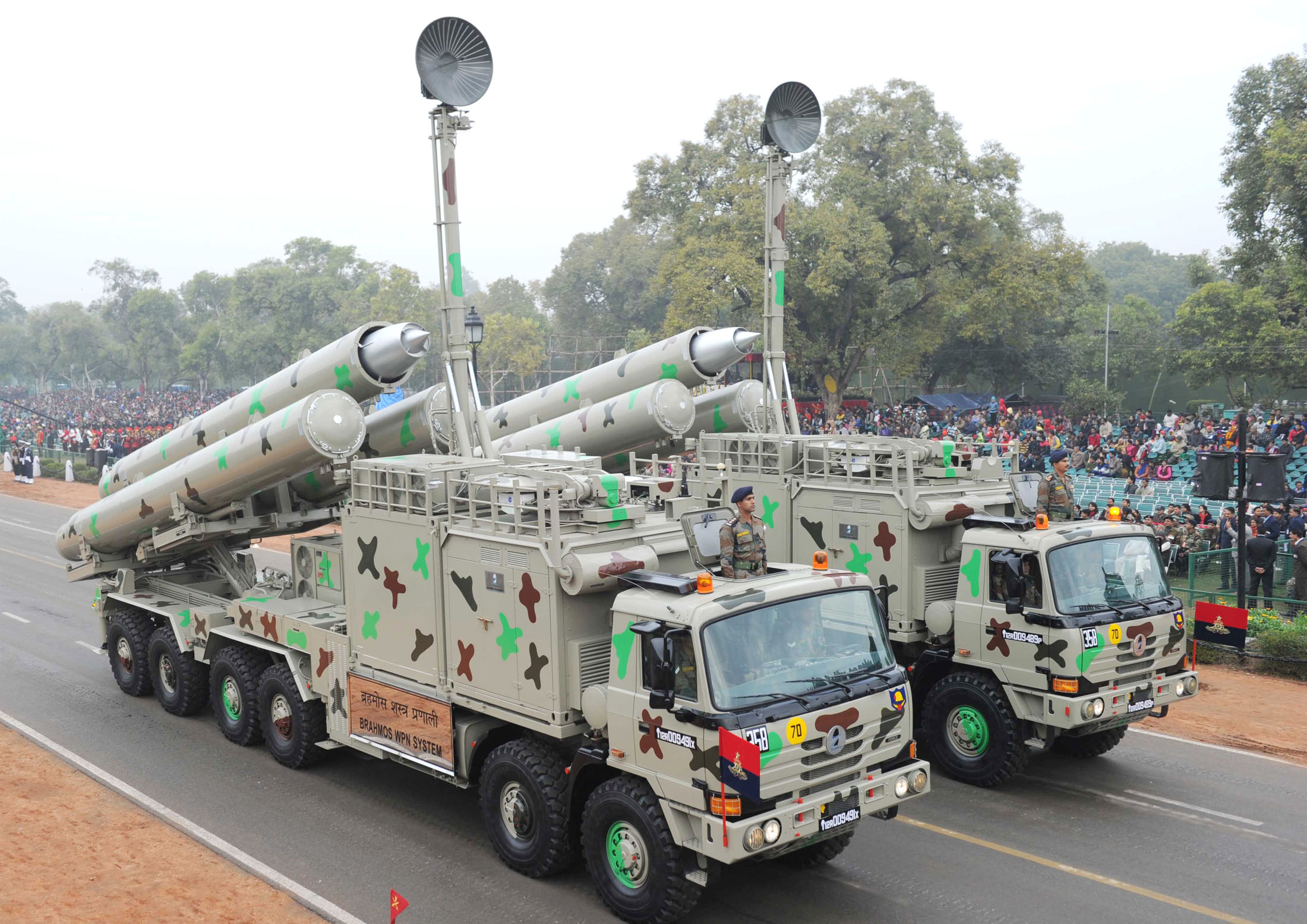
BrahMos missiles

Governor of States of India

- General O.P. Malhotra, PVSM – Punjab (1990–1991)
- Lieutenant General J.F.R. Jacob, PVSM – Goa (1998 to 1999) and Punjab (1999 to 2003)
- Lieutenant General K.M. Seth, PVSM, AVSM – Tripura (2002–2003), Chhattisgarh (2003–2007) and Madhya Pradesh (2004)
- General S.F. Rodrigues, PVSM, VSM – Punjab (2004–2009)
- Lieutenant General M.M. Lakhera, PVSM, AVSM, VSM – Governor of Mizoram (2006–2011) & Lieutenant Governor of Puducherry (2004–2006) and Andaman & Nicobar Islands (2006).
- Captain Shekhar Dutt, SM, IAS – Chhattisgarh (2010–2014)

Commanders-in-Chief of India

- Field Marshal Frederick Sleigh Roberts, 1st Earl Roberts, VC, KG, KP, GCB, OM, GCSI, GCIE, KStJ, VD, PC, FRSGS (November 1885 – April 1893)

Chief of Army Staff of the Indian Army

- General Paramasiva Prabhakar Kumaramangalam DSO, OBE (7 June 1966 – 7 June 1969)
- General Om Prakash Malhotra PVSM (31 May 1978 – 31 May 1981)
- General Sunith Francis Rodrigues PVSM, VSM (30 June 1990 – 30 June 1993)
- General Sundararajan Padmanabhan PVSM, AVSM, VSM (30 September 2000 – 31 December 2002)
- General Deepak Kapoor PVSM, AVSM, SM, VSM (30 September 2007 – 31 March 2010)

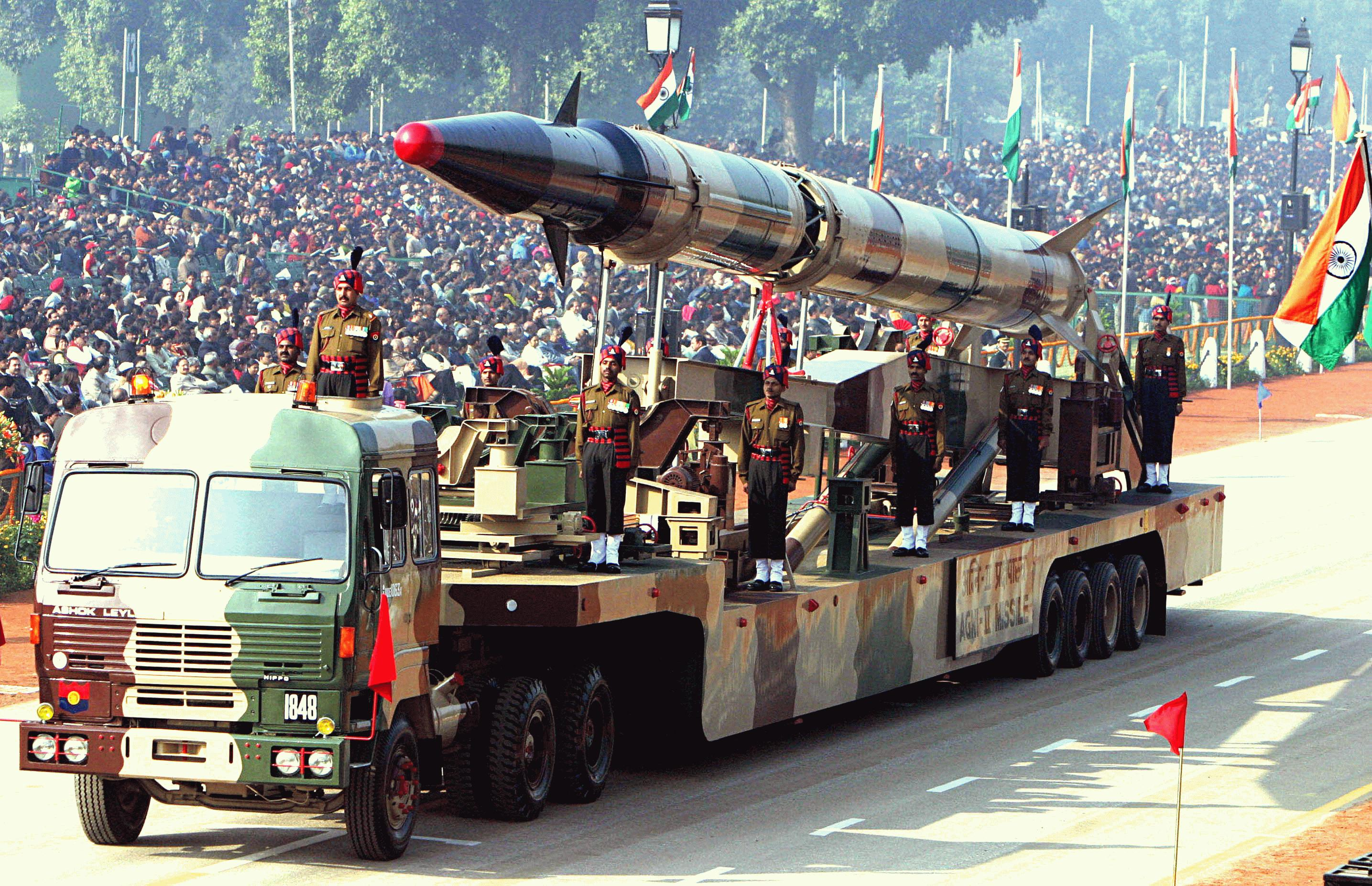
Agni-II missile

Victoria Cross winners

- Indian Rebellion of 1857 -
  - Sergeant Bernard Diamond, Gunner Richard Fitzgerald, Lieutenant Hastings Edward Harrington, Lieutenant James Hills-Johnes, Rough Rider Edward Jennings, Gunner Thomas Laughnan, Gunner Hugh McInnes, Captain William Olpherts, Gunner James Park, Captain George Alexander Renny, Lieutenant Frederick Roberts, Bombardier Jacob Thomas, Lieutenant Colonel Henry Tombs, Major Richard Keatinge.
- World War II -
  - Captain Umrao Singh Yadav

Post-Independence -

- Ashok Chakra winners -
  - Major D. Sreeram Kumar
- Maha Vir Chakra winners –
  - Major General Mohindar Singh
  - Major Sushil Kumar Mathur
  - Captain Dara Dineshaw Mistry
  - Brigadier Kailash Prasad Pande
  - Captain Pradip Kumar Gour
  - Second Lieutenant Shyamal Dev Goswamy
  - Captain Pratap Singh
- Kirti Chakra winners -
  - Major Braj Kishore Sharma
  - Major Kumandur Prabhakar Vinay
  - Major Sukhwinder Jeet Singh Randhawa
  - Major Krishna Murthy Balasubramaniam
  - Major Gurcharan Singh
  - Captain (Later Colonel) Arjun Singh Guleria
  - Havildar Indra Bahadur Gurung
  - Lance Naik Attar Singh
  - Naik Dilwar Khan
  - Lance Naik Meenatchi Sundaram A

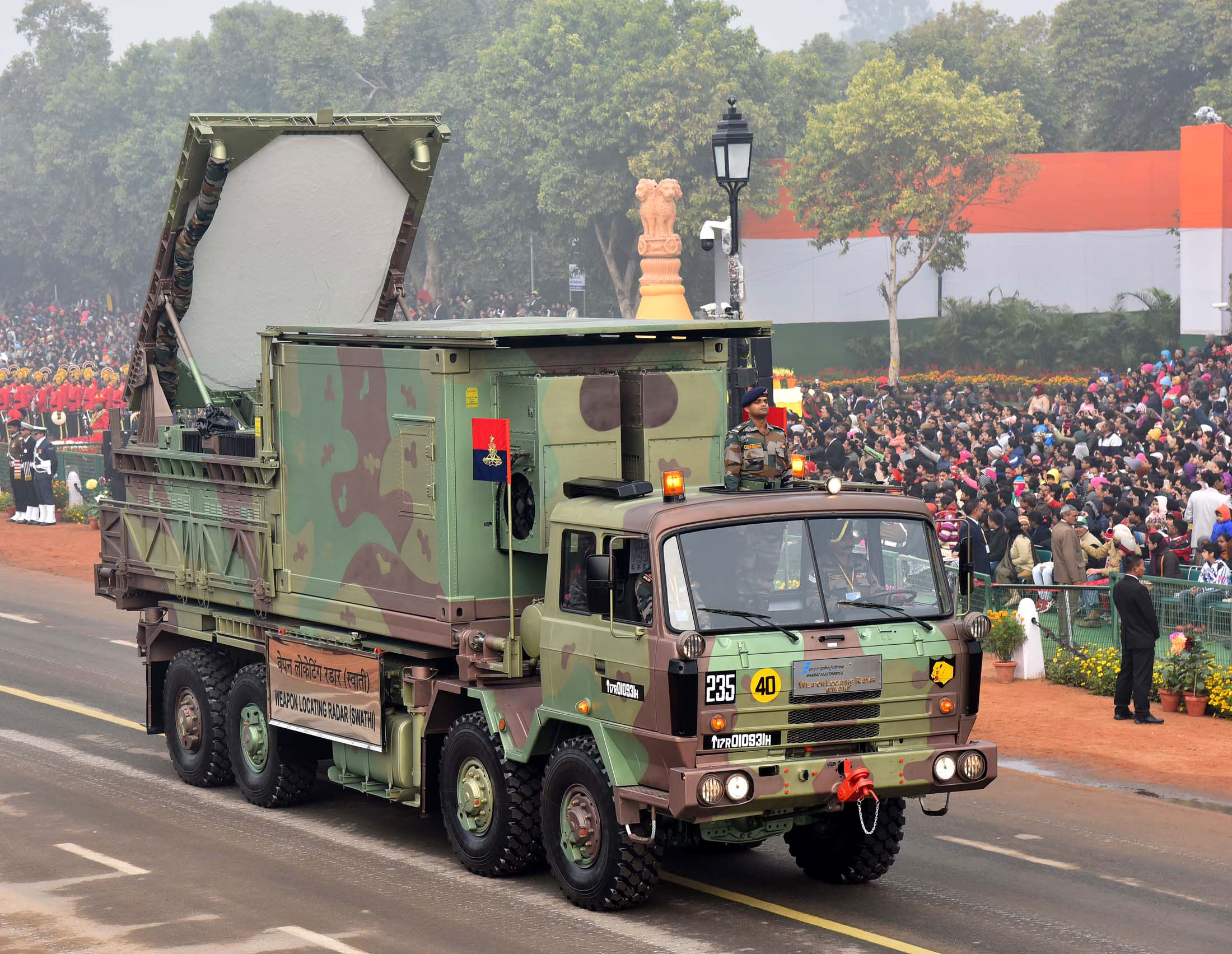
Weapon Locating Radar (Swathi)

Others

- Lieutenant General Prem Singh Gyani – First Indian officer to be commissioned out of the Royal Military Academy, Woolwich, in 1932. He became the first Indian officer to command an Indian field regiment, the 2 Indian Field Regiment.
- Brigadier Furdoon Siavax Byramji Mehta – first Indian Artillery officer to wear the wings of the Air Observation Post (Air OP) in 1944, now known as Army Aviation Corps, believed to be the only Indian officer to have flown with a British Air Observation Post Squadron in the Second World War.
