= List of serving generals of the Indian Army =

This is a list of serving generals of the Indian Army. The Army’s senior leadership has 2 Generals, almost 90 Lieutenant Generals, 300 Major Generals and 1,200 Brigadiers in its 43,000-strong officer cadre.

== Chief of Defence Staff ==
Post	Rank	Name	Photo	Decorations	Reference
Chief of Defence Staff (Secretary, Department of Military Affairs)*	General	N. S. Raja Subramani		PVSM, AVSM, SM, VSM	

*Rotational appointment among the Indian Armed Forces.

== Chief of the Army Staff ==
Post	Rank	Name	Photo	Decorations	Reference
Chief of the Army Staff	General	Dhiraj Seth		PVSM, UYSM, AVSM	

== Vice Chief of the Army Staff ==
Post	Rank	Name	Photo	Decorations	Reference
Vice Chief of the Army Staff	Lieutenant General	Sandeep Jain		AVSM, SM	

== Army Commanders (Commander-in-Chief grade) ==
Post	Rank	Name	Photo	Decorations	Reference
General Officer Commanding-in-Chief; Northern Command	Lieutenant General	Pratik Sharma		SYSM, PVSM, AVSM, SM	
General Officer Commanding-in-Chief; Eastern Command	Lieutenant General	V. M. Bhuvana Krishnan		PVSM, AVSM, YSM	
General Officer Commanding-in-Chief; Western Command	Lieutenant General	Pushpendra Pal Singh		AVSM, SM**	
General Officer Commanding-in-Chief; Central Command	Lieutenant General	Sanjay Mitra		AVSM	
General Officer Commanding-in-Chief; Southern Command	Lieutenant General	Rajesh Pushkar		AVSM, VSM	
General Officer Commanding-in-Chief; South Western Command	Lieutenant General	Mohit Malhotra		AVSM, SM	
General Officer Commanding-in-Chief; Army Training Command	Lieutenant General	Shrinjay Pratap Singh		AVSM, YSM	
Commander-in-Chief, Strategic Forces Command**	Lieutenant General	Dinesh Singh Rana		PVSM, AVSM, YSM, SM, PhD	
Commander-in-Chief, Andaman and Nicobar Command**	Lieutenant General	Presently tenanted by an Indian Navy Officer			
Chief of Integrated Defence Staff**	Lieutenant General	Presently tenanted by an Indian Air Force Officer			
Director General Armed Forces Medical Services**	Lieutenant General	Presently tenanted by an Indian Air Force Officer			

**Rotational Command among the Indian Armed Forces

== Principal Staff Officers (PSO) ==
Post	Rank	Name	Photo	Decorations	Reference
Deputy Chief of Army Staff (Strategy)	Lieutenant General	Rajiv Ghai		SYSM, UYSM, AVSM, SM***	
Deputy Chief of Army Staff (Information Systems and Training)	Lieutenant General	Vipul Shinghal		AVSM, SM	
Deputy Chief of Army Staff (Capability Development and Sustenance)	Lieutenant General	Shamsher Singh Virk		AVSM, SM	
Adjutant General	Lieutenant General	Viresh Pratap Singh Kaushik		PVSM, UYSM, YSM, SM	
Military Secretary	Lieutenant General	Rashim Bali		PVSM, UYSM, AVSM, SM, VSM	
Quartermaster General	Lieutenant General	Prashant Srivastava		UYSM, AVSM, SM	
Master General Sustenance	Lieutenant General	Amardeep Singh Aujla		PVSM, UYSM, YSM, SM, VSM	
Engineer-In-Chief	Lieutenant General	Vikas Rohella		AVSM, SM**	

== General Officers of Armed Forces Commands ==
Post	Rank	Name	Photo	Decorations	Reference
Additional Secretary, Department of Military Affairs	Lieutenant General	Presently tenanted by an Indian Air Force Officer			
Deputy Chief of Integrated Defence Staff (Operations)	Lieutenant General	Zubin A. Minwalla		UYSM, AVSM, YSM	
Deputy Chief of Integrated Defence Staff (Policy Planning & Force Development)	Lieutenant General	Presently tenanted by an Indian Air Force Officer			
Director General DIA & Deputy Chief of Integrated Defence Staff (Intelligence)	Lieutenant General	V. Hariharan		AVSM, SM	
Deputy Chief of Integrated Defence Staff (Doctrine, Organization & Training)	Lieutenant General	Presently tenanted by an Indian Navy Officer			
Deputy Chief of Integrated Defence Staff (Medical)	Lieutenant General	Presently tenanted by an Indian Navy Officer			
Deputy Commander-in-Chief, Strategic Forces Command	Lieutenant General	Sanjeev Chauhan		AVSM, YSM	
Director General (Organisation & Personnel); Armed Forces Medical Services	Lieutenant General	Presently tenanted by an Indian Air Force Officer			
Director General Hospital Services; Armed Forces Medical Services	Lieutenant General	Presently tenanted by an Indian Navy Officer			

== Chiefs of Staff of Army Commands ==
Post	Rank	Name	Photo	Decorations	Reference
Chief of Staff Northern Command	Lieutenant General	M P Singh		AVSM, YSM, SM	
Chief of Staff Eastern Command	Lieutenant General	Gambhir Singh		UYSM, AVSM, YSM	
Chief of Staff Western Command	Lieutenant General	Harjeet Singh Sahi		PVSM, UYSM, AVSM, YSM, SM	
Chief of Staff Central Command	Lieutenant General	C J Jayachandran			
Chief of Staff Southern Command	Lieutenant General	Ajay Kumar		AVSM, VSM	
Chief of Staff South Western Command	Lieutenant General	Padam Singh Shekhawat		PVSM, AVSM, SM	
Chief of Staff Army Training Command	Lieutenant General	Ranbir Singh Lamba			

== Heads of Combat and Combat Support Arms ==
Post	Rank	Name	Photo	Decorations	Reference
Director General Infantry	Lieutenant General	Anil Kumar Pundir		SM, VSM	
Director General Artillery	Lieutenant General	Anoop Shinghal		AVSM, SM	
Director General Army Aviation	Lieutenant General	Vinod Nambiar		SM	
Director General Army Air Defence	Lieutenant General	I S Panjrath		SM, VSM	
Director General Armoured Corps	Lieutenant General	Prit Pal Singh		PVSM, AVSM	
Signal Officer-in-Chief	Lieutenant General	Vivek Dogra		SM	

== Heads of Services and Directorates ==
Post	Rank	Name	Photo	Decorations	Reference
Director General Military Operations	Lieutenant General	Abhijit S Pendharkar		UYSM, AVSM, YSM	
Director General Military Intelligence	Lieutenant General	Yash Singh Ahlawat		AVSM, YSM	
Director General Operational Logistics	Lieutenant General				
Director General Supplies and Transport	Lieutenant General	Mukesh Chadha		AVSM, SM, VSM	
Director General Medical Services (Army)	Lieutenant General	C G Muralidharan		AVSM	
Director General Manpower Planning and Personnel Services	Lieutenant General	Rajeev Puri		AVSM, VSM	
Director General Ordnance Services	Lieutenant General	Deepak Ahuja			
Director General Dental Services	Lieutenant General	Balakrishnan Jayan			
Director General Electronics and Mechanical Engineers	Lieutenant General	Rajiv Kumar Sahni		AVSM, VSM, PhD	
Director General Border Roads Organisation	Lieutenant General	Harpal Singh		AVSM, VSM	
Director General Capability Development	Lieutenant General	Vineet Gaur		PVSM, AVSM	
Director General Integrated Training	Lieutenant General	Sushil Chander Mahant		SM	
Director General Information Systems	Lieutenant General	Harsh Chhibber		AVSM, VSM, PhD	
Director General Information Warfare	Lieutenant General				
Director General Strategic Planning	Lieutenant General	Puneet Ahuja		AVSM, SM, VSM	
Director General Staff Duties	Lieutenant General				
Director General National Cadet Corps	Lieutenant General	Virendra Vats		YSM, SM, VSM	
Director General Recruiting	Lieutenant General	R S Sundaram		SM, VSM	
Director General Financial Planning	Lieutenant General				
Director General Territorial Army	Lieutenant General	Prasanna Kishore Mishra		UYSM, AVSM, YSM, SM	
Director General Land, Works and Environment	Lieutenant General				
Director General Discipline, Ceremonials and Welfare	Lieutenant General	Ranjeet Singh		AVSM	
Director General Resettlement	Major General	S B K Singh		SM	
Additional Director General; International Cooperation	Major General				
Additional Director General Strategic Communication	Major General	Sandeep S Sharda		YSM, SM, VSM	
Additional Director General Rashtriya Rifles	Major General	S H Naqvi		SM, VSM	
Additional Director General Army Education Corps	Major General	Tamojeet Biswas			
Provost Marshal Corps of Military Police	Major General	Vikram Singh Sekhon		YSM, SM	
Judge Advocate General, Indian Army	Major General	B S Negi			
Additional Director General (Litigation) Indian Army	Major General	Javed Iqbal			
Additional Director General Military Nursing Service	Major General	Rachel Thomas			
Additional Director General Army Postal Service Corps	Major General	Shipra Sharma		VSM	
Additional Director General of Human Rights	Major General	Anand Saxena			

== Commandants of Training Institutions ==
Post	Rank	Name	Photo	Decorations	Reference
Commandant Indian Military Academy	Lieutenant General	Nagendra Singh		AVSM, YSM, SM	
Commandant National Defence Academy	Lieutenant General	Presently tenanted by an Indian Navy Officer			
Commandant Armed Forces Medical College	Lieutenant General	Presently tenanted by an Indian Navy Officer			
Commandant Officers Training Academy, Gaya	Lieutenant General	Sandeep Singh		AVSM	
Commandant Officers Training Academy, Chennai	Lieutenant General	Michael A J Fernandez		PVSM, AVSM, VSM	
Commandant Defence Services Staff College	Lieutenant General	Manish Mohan Erry		PVSM, UYSM, AVSM, SM	
Commandant Army Hospital Research and Referral	Lieutenant General	Avinash Das			
Commandant Infantry School	Lieutenant General	Vijay B Nair		AVSM, SM	
Commandant Army War College	Lieutenant General	Ajay Chandpuria		AVSM, VSM	
Commandant National Defence College	Lieutenant General	Presently tenanted by an Indian Air Force Officer			
Commandant School of Artillery	Lieutenant General	Navneet Singh Sarna		PVSM, AVSM, SM, VSM	
Commandant Army Air Defence College	Lieutenant General	Amit Rao			
Commandant Military Intelligence Training School and Depot	Lieutenant General	Devinder Pal		AVSM, SM	
Commandant Army Service Corps Centre and College	Lieutenant General	Ajay Ramdev		SM	
Commandant Army Medical Corps Centre and College	Lieutenant General	J Debnath			
Commandant College of Military Engineering	Lieutenant General	Amit Singh Sohal		VSM**	
Commandant Military College of Telecommunication Engineering	Lieutenant General	Praveen Bakshi		VSM	
Commandant Military College of Electronics and Mechanical Engineering	Lieutenant General	I S Rathore			
Commandant College of Materials Management	Lieutenant General	Sandeep Narang		SM	
Commandant Counter Insurgency and Jungle Warfare School	Major General	Kulvir Singh		SM**	
Commandant High Altitude Warfare School	Major General	Anil Kumar		KC	
Commandant College of Defence Management	Major General	Presently tenanted by an Indian Air Force Officer			
Commandant Military Institute of Technology	Major General	Presently tenanted by an Indian Navy Officer			
Commandant Armoured Corps Centre and School	Major General	Vikram Varma		SM, VSM**	
Commandant Indian Military Training Team Bhutan	Major General				

== General Officers Commanding Corps ==
Post	Rank	Name	Photo	Decorations	Reference
General Officer Commanding I Corps; Strike One Corps	Lieutenant General	Akhilesh Kumar		SM, VSM	
General Officer Commanding II Corps; Kharga Corps	Lieutenant General	Manish Luthra		AVSM	
General Officer Commanding III Corps; Spear Corps	Lieutenant General	Girish Kalia		AVSM, VSM	
General Officer Commanding IV Corps; Gajraj Corps	Lieutenant General	Neeraj Shukla		AVSM, SM**	
General Officer Commanding IX Corps; Rising Star Corps	Lieutenant General	Akaash Johar		AVSM	
General Officer Commanding X Corps; Chetak Corps	Lieutenant General	Vikrant Suresh Deshpande		AVSM	
General Officer Commanding XI Corps; Vajra Corps	Lieutenant General	Amit Kabthiyal		YSM, SM**	
General Officer Commanding XII Corps; Konark Corps	Lieutenant General	Aditya Vikram Singh Rathee		AVSM, SM, VSM	
General Officer Commanding XIV Corps; Fire and Fury Corps	Lieutenant General	Madanraj Pande		AVSM, SM, VSM	
General Officer Commanding XV Corps; Chinar Corps	Lieutenant General	Balbir Singh		AVSM, YSM, VSM	
General Officer Commanding XVI Corps; White Knight Corps	Lieutenant General	Mohit Seth		SM, VSM**	
General Officer Commanding XVII Corps; Brahmastra Corps	Lieutenant General	Sameer S. Kartikeya		YSM, SM	
General Officer Commanding XXI Corps; Sudarshan Chakra Corps	Lieutenant General	Arvind Chauhan		YSM, SM	
General Officer Commanding XXXIII Corps; Trishakti Corps	Lieutenant General	Man Raj Singh Mann		SM**	

== General Officers Commanding Areas ==
Post	Rank	Name	Photo	Decorations	Reference
General Officer Commanding Delhi Area	Lieutenant General	Rajesh Sethi		AVSM, SM, VSM	
General Officer Commanding Uttar Bharat Area	Lieutenant General	Divya Gaurav Misra		AVSM	
General Officer Commanding Madhya Bharat Area	Lieutenant General	Harbinder Singh Vandra		AVSM, SM	
General Officer Commanding Dakshin Bharat Area	Lieutenant General	Ulhas Kirpekar		AVSM, SM	
General Officer Commanding Maharashtra, Gujarat and Goa Area	Lieutenant General	Dheerendra Singh Kushwah		PVSM, AVSM, SM	
General Officer Commanding 101 Area	Lieutenant General	Mohit Wadhwa		SM	
General Officer Commanding 111 Area	Lieutenant General	Pawan Chadha		SM, VSM	

== Other General Officers ==
Post	Rank	Name	Photo	Decorations	Reference
Director General of Assam Rifles	Lieutenant General	Vikas Lakhera		AVSM, SM	
Force Commander, UNMISS	Lieutenant General	Mohan Subramanian	Fremaless	PVSM, AVSM, SM, VSM	
Military Secretary to the President	Major General	Voodev Parida		AVSM, VSM	
Joint Secretary Army & TA	Major General	Gurpreet Singh Choudhry		AVSM, SM, VSM	

== See also ==
- List of serving admirals of the Indian Navy
- List of serving marshals of the Indian Air Force
