= Manoj Kumar Katiyar =

Lieutenant general in Indian Army

Lieutenant General Manoj Kumar Katiyar PVSM UYSM AVSM
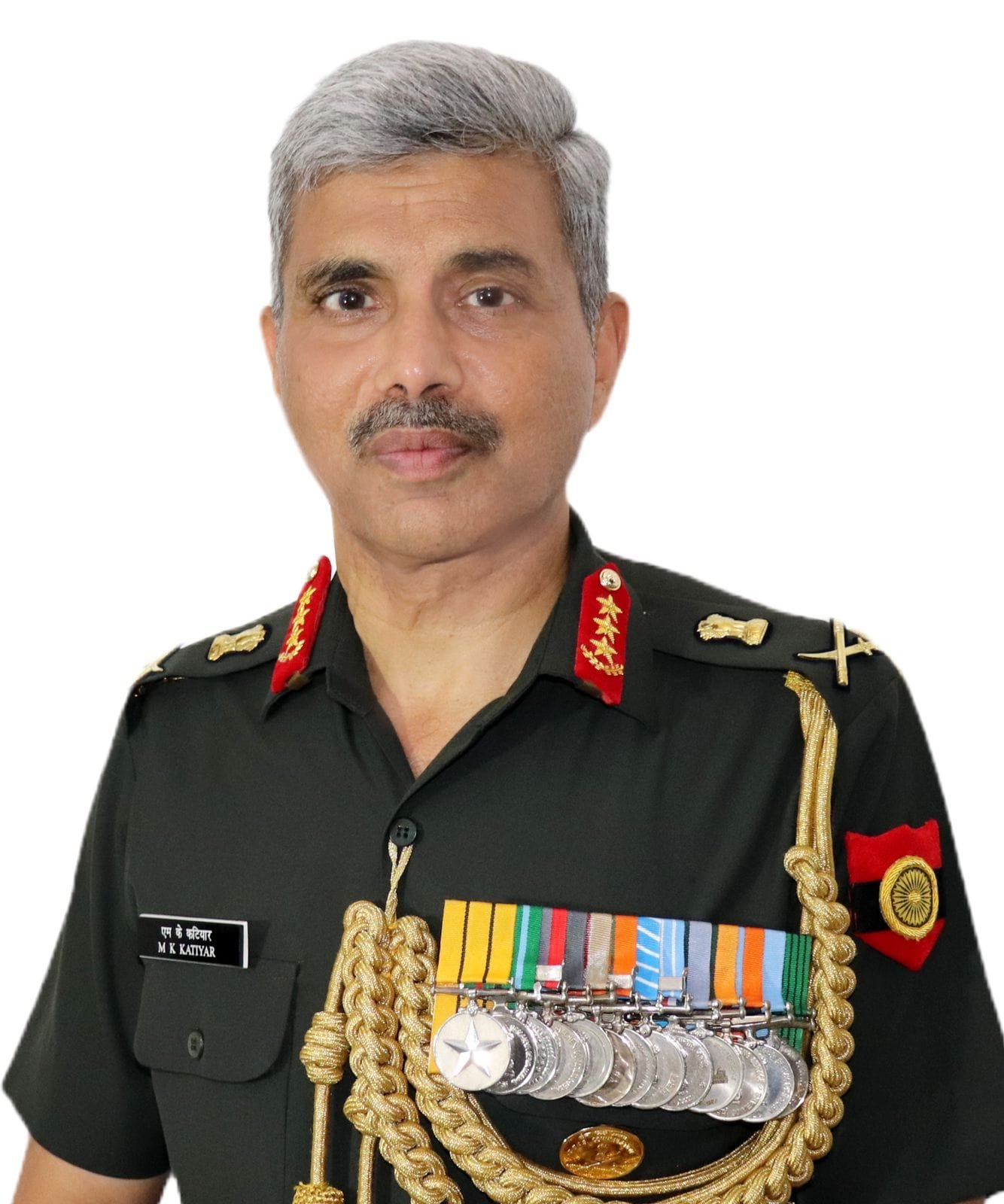
- Official Portrait, 2023

General Officer Commanding-in-Chief Western Command
- In office 1 July 2023 – 31 March 2026
- Chief of Army Staff: Manoj Pande; Upendra Dwivedi
- Preceded by: Nav Kumar Khanduri
- Succeeded by: Pushpendra Pal Singh

Personal details
- Spouse: Suchi Katiyar
- Education: Sainik School Ghorakhal; National Defence Academy; Indian Military Academy

Military service
- Allegiance: India
- Branch/service: Indian Army
- Years of service: 14 June 1986 – 31 March 2026
- Rank: Lieutenant General
- Unit: 23 Rajput Regiment
- Commands: Western Command; I Corps; 6th Mountain Division
- Battles/wars: Operation Sindoor
- Service number: IC-43725N
- Awards: Param Vishisht Seva Medal; Uttam Yudh Seva Medal; Ati Vishisht Seva Medal

Lieutenant General Manoj Kumar Katiyar, PVSM, UYSM, AVSM is a retired general officer of the Indian Army. He last served as the General Officer Commanding-in-Chief Western Command. He earlier served as the Director General of Military Operations (DGMO) at IHQ of MoD (Army), prior to that he was General Officer Commanding I Corps. He is also the Colonel of the Regiment of the Rajput Regiment since 1 February 2022.

== Early life and education ==
The general officer is an alumnus of Sainik School, Ghorakhal. He then attended the National Defence Academy and the Indian Military Academy. He has done all important courses to include Defence Services Staff Course, Wellington and National Defence College course. Besides, he is also a Distinguished graduate of National War College, USA.

== Military career ==
He was commissioned into the 23th battalion of the Rajput Regiment in June 1986 from the Indian Military Academy, Dehradun. In a distinguished career spanning over 37 years he has served across vivid terrains and has undertaken many staff and instructional appointments. He has served in Siachen Glacier, along LC both in 15 & 16 Corps and along LAC in 3, 14 and 33 Corps. He commanded his battalion twice; in Uri Sect and at Taksing in Western RALP. He commanded an Infantry Brigade along Western Borders, Army HQ Res Mountain Division along Northern Borders. He has been an instructor in Indian Military Training Team in Bhutan and a Directing Staff at Defence Services Staff College. The general officers' staff appointments include a Grade 1 post in Military Operations Directorate, Brigadier General Staff appointments in HQ Corps and in HQ Central Command and Director General of Staff Duties at IHQ of MoD (Army), New Delhi.

On 5 April 2021, he took over as the General Officer Commanding I Corps from Lieutenant General C. P. Cariappa. After completing his term as I Corps Commander, on 11 May 2022 he assumed the appointment as the Director General of Military Operations.

On 1 July 2023, Lieutenant General Manoj Kumar Katiyar took over as the General Officer Commanding-in-Chief Western Command succeeding Lieutenant General Nav K Khanduri when the latter superannuated from service on 30 June 2023.

== Personal life ==
He is married to Mrs Shuchi Katiyar, a homemaker, and the couple is blessed with two sons; Achintya Katiyar is working in an IT Company in Bangalore and Kushagra Katiyar is pursuing graduation.

== Awards and decorations ==
The General officer has been awarded with the Param Vishisht Seva Medal on Republic Day 2025, the Uttam Yudh Seva Medal on Independence Day 2025 and the Ati Vishisht Seva Medal in 2021.

Param Vishisht Seva Medal	Uttam Yudh Seva Medal		Ati Vishisht Seva Medal
Samanya Seva Medal	Special Service Medal	Siachen Glacier Medal	Operation Parakram Medal
Sainya Seva Medal	High Altitude Medal	Videsh Seva Medal	75th Independence Anniversary Medal
50th Independence Anniversary Medal	30 Years Long Service Medal	20 Years Long Service Medal	9 Years Long Service Medal

== Dates of rank ==
Insignia	Rank	Component	Date of rank
	Second Lieutenant	Indian Army	14 June 1986
	Lieutenant	Indian Army	14 June 1988
	Captain	Indian Army	14 June 1991
	Major	Indian Army	14 June 1997
	Lieutenant Colonel	Indian Army	16 December 2004
	Colonel	Indian Army	1 May 2007
	Brigadier	Indian Army	14 December 2012 (acting); 1 April 2013 (substantive, with seniority from 11 June 2011)
	Major General	Indian Army	1 October 2018 (seniority from 1 February 2017)
	Lieutenant General	Indian Army	1 January 2021

Military offices
Preceded by Nav Kumar Khanduri	General Officer Commanding-in-Chief Western Command; 1 July 2023 – 31 March 2026	Succeeded by Pushpendra Pal Singh
Preceded by B. S. Raju	Director General Military Operations; 1 May 2022 - 30 June 2023	Succeeded by Pratik Sharma
Preceded by C.P. Cariappa	General Officer Commanding I Corps; 6 April 2021 – 30 April 2022	Succeeded by Gajendra Joshi
