= Sanjay Mitra =

Sanjay Mitra may refer to:

- Sanjay Mitra (actor), Indian film actor
- Sanjay Mitra (civil servant) (born 1959), Former Defence Secretary, India
- Sanjay Mitra (general), Lieutenant General in the Indian Army
