= Rashim Bali =

Indian Army general

Lieutenant General Rashim Bali PVSM UYSM AVSM SM VSM
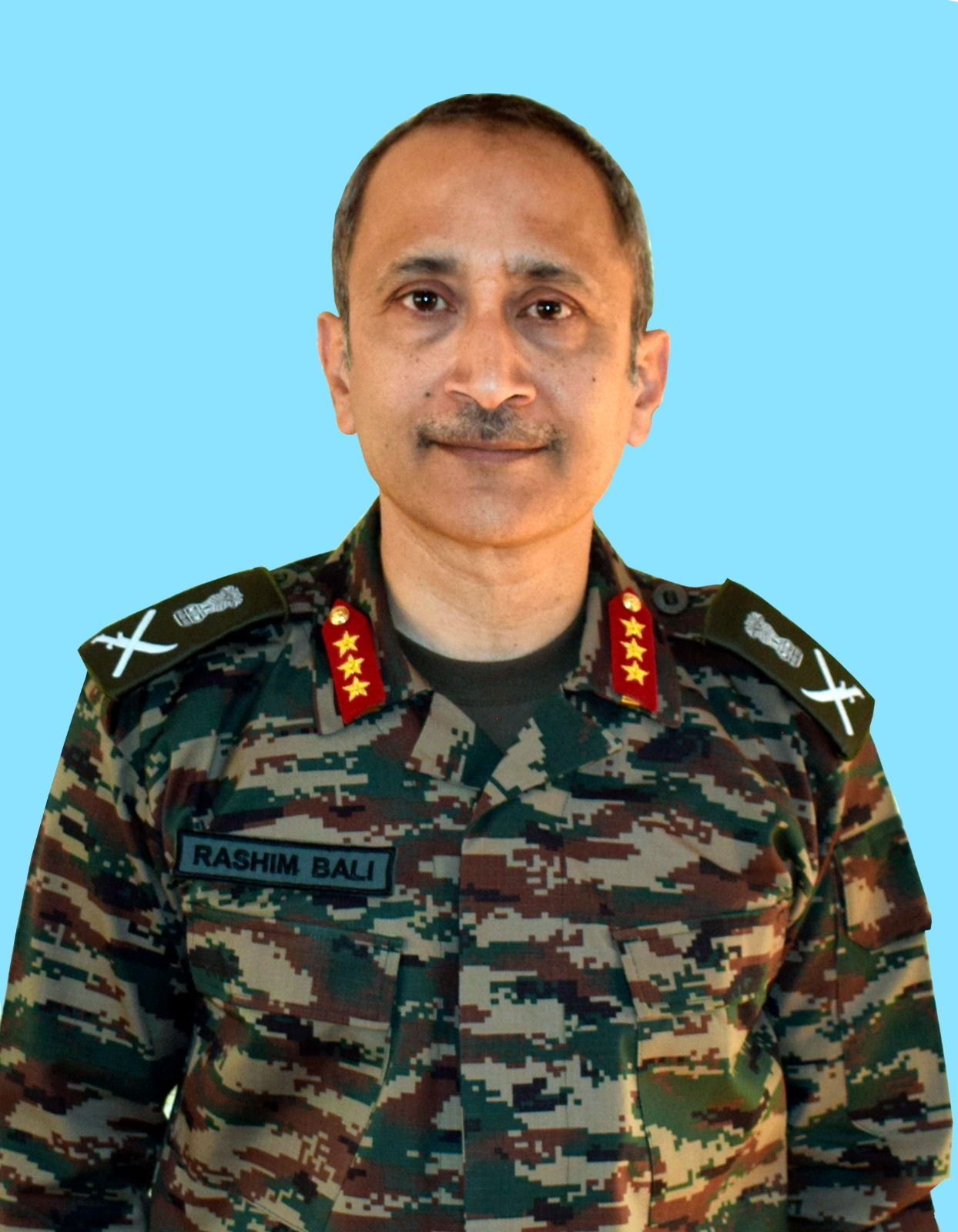
- Lieutenant General Rashim Bali
- Military career
- Allegiance: India
- Branch: Indian Army
- Service years: December 1988–present
- Rank: Lieutenant General
- Unit: Sikh Light Infantry
- Commands: Military Secretary; XIV Corps; Victor Force
- Conflicts: Counter-insurgency operations in Jammu and Kashmir; Ladakh border standoff
- Awards: Param Vishisht Seva Medal; Uttam Yudh Seva Medal; Ati Vishisht Seva Medal; Sena Medal; Vishisht Seva Medal

Rashim Bali PVSM UYSM AVSM SM VSM is a serving Lieutenant General of the Indian Army. He currently serves as the Military Secretary at Army Headquarters. Previously, he commanded the XIV Corps (Fire and Fury Corps) responsible for the Ladakh sector of the Line of Actual Control with China.

== Military career ==
Bali was commissioned into the Sikh Light Infantry regiment of the Indian Army.

His career has included a tenure as the Defence Attaché to Afghanistan, a key diplomatic-military role.

He later commanded the Victor Force (a counter-insurgency formation of the Rashtriya Rifles) in South Kashmir. During his tenure there, the army conducted successful operations that led to the elimination and surrender of terrorists, and initiatives to educate parents to dissuade their children from militancy and join the mainstream.

On 13 March 2023, Bali took over command of the strategically important XIV Corps (Fire and Fury Corps) in Leh from Lieutenant General Anindya Sengupta. The XIV Corps is responsible for security along the Line of Actual Control (LAC) with China in the Ladakh sector and the Line of Control with Pakistan. His appointment as Corps Commander came amid the continued stand-off with China along the LAC in Eastern Ladakh and ahead of the 18th round of Corps Commander-level talks between India and China. Upon assuming command, he paid homage at the War Memorial in Leh and exhorted all ranks to continue working with soldierly commitment and zeal. One of his first acts as corps commander was to visit the troops at the Siachen Glacier, the world's highest battlefield, where he interacted with and commended them for their zeal and enthusiasm in the harsh terrain and inclement weather. He also visited frontline troops deployed at the frozen frontiers of the Siachen Glacier, complimenting all ranks for maintaining the highest standards of combat readiness and operational preparedness.

Bali relinquished command of XIV Corps on 30 June 2024.

Following his command of XIV Corps, Bali was appointed as the Military Secretary at Army Headquarters.

He also serves as the Colonel of the Regiment for the Sikh Light Infantry.

== Awards and decorations ==
Bali has been awarded the Param Vishisht Seva Medal (PVSM), Uttam Yudh Seva Medal (UYSM), Ati Vishisht Seva Medal (AVSM), Sena Medal (SM), and Vishisht Seva Medal (VSM) during his military career.

Param Vishisht Seva Medal		Uttam Yudh Seva Medal	
Ati Vishisht Seva Medal	Sena Medal	Vishisht Seva Medal	Wound Medal
Samanya Seva Medal	Special Service Medal	Siachen Glacier Medal	Operation Vijay Medal
Sainya Seva Medal	High Altitude Medal	Videsh Seva Medal	75th Independence Anniversary Medal
50th Independence Anniversary Medal	30 Years Long Service Medal	20 Years Long Service Medal	9 Years Long Service Medal
