= Uttar Pradesh State Disaster Management Authority =

State Disaster Management Authority, Government of Uttar Pradesh, India

- Established: 2011
- Chair: Chairman - Hon'ble Chief Minister Yogi Adityanath, Vice Chairman - Hon'ble Lt. General Yogendra Dimri, AVSM
- Address: Picup Bhawan, B-2 Ground floor, Vibhuti Khand, Gomti Nagar, Lucknow, Uttar Pradesh 226010
- Location: VX9W+5PP, Mandi Parishad Rd, Vibhuti Khand, Gomti Nagar, Lucknow, Uttar Pradesh 226010, Lucknow, Uttar Pradesh, India
- Website: https://upsdma.up.nic.in/

== Uttar Pradesh State Disaster Management Authority ==
The Uttar Pradesh State Disaster Management Authority is a government agency tasked with the responsibility of coordinating disaster management efforts within the state of Uttar Pradesh, India. It was established to address the growing challenges posed by natural and man-made disasters, and operates under the mandate of the Disaster Management Act, 2005. Since its inception on January 12, 2011, the Uttar Pradesh State Disaster Management Authority has been at the forefront of disaster preparedness, response, and mitigation efforts within the state of Uttar Pradesh, India.

== Background ==
The authority was established under Section 14 of the Disaster Management Act, 2005, making it compulsory for each State Government to establish a State Disaster Management Authority. This body comprises the State's Chief Minister, serving as the chairperson, and a maximum of eight members appointed by the Chief Minister. Furthermore, as outlined in Section 22, the State Executive Committee is tasked with formulating the state disaster management plan and executing the National Plan. Additionally, under Section 28, the State Disaster Management Authority is obligated to ensure that all state departments develop disaster management plans in accordance with the directives issued by the National and State Authorities.

== Vice Chairperson ==
Lt. Gen. Yogendra Dimri, PVSM, AVSM, VSM, has assumed the role of Vice Chairman of the Uttar Pradesh State Disaster Management Authority, succeeding Lt. Gen. Ravindra Pratap Sahi, AVSM, who served in this capacity from 2018 to 2024. According to the provisions outlined in clause (b) of subsection (2) of Section 14 of the Disaster Management Act, 2005, the Vice Chairperson is designated by the chairman, who is the Chief Minister of the state. Lt. Gen. Dimri commenced his new position effective January 15, 2024.

== State Executive Committee (SEC) ==
According to section 20(1) of the Disaster Management Act, 2005, there is a provision for the establishment of a State Executive Committee (SEC). This committee, led by the Chief Secretary of the state, is tasked with the coordination and oversight of the implementation of the National Policy, the National Plan, and the State Plan as outlined in the DM Act 2005.

The State Executive Committee comprises several members, including the Chief Secretary to the State Government, who serves as the Chairperson ex officio, and four Secretaries to the Government of the State from relevant departments as determined by the State Government. The primary role of the State Executive Committee is to support the Uttar Pradesh State Disaster Management Authority in its functions and to facilitate coordinated action in line with guidelines set by the State Authority. Additionally, it ensures compliance with directives issued by the State Government.

== State Advisory Committee ==
Section 17 of the Disaster Management Act, 2005, the lays down the procedure of appointing advisory committee by the State Authority. This committee can be formed as deemed necessary by the State Authority and is typically composed of experts with specialised knowledge and practical experience in disaster management. The primary purpose of this advisory committee is to provide recommendations on various aspects of disaster management based on their expertise and experience. Under Section 17(1) of Disaster Management Act, 2005 the UPSDMA has appointed Dr. Bhanu Mall, Dr. Kashif Imdad and Dr. P.K. Rao as members of the State Advisory Committee.

== State Disaster Management Plan-2023 ==
The Uttar Pradesh State Disaster Management Plan-2023, formulated by UPSDMA, aims to build a disaster-resilient state aligned with national and global frameworks. Its objectives include assessing risks, promoting disaster risk reduction, strengthening governance, mainstreaming DRM into development, ensuring effective response, and building back better. Key features include a multi-hazard approach, time-bound implementation, stakeholder engagement, and a focus on prevention, mitigation, and technology integration. The organizational structure involves the SDMA at the state level, headed by the Chief Minister, the SEC led by the Chief Secretary, the State Relief Commissioner, SDRF, SEOC, and DDMAs at the district level. The plan outlines procedures for various disasters and emphasizes social inclusion and capacity building.
