= Department of Military Affairs =

Department under ministry of defence, Government of India

- Parent Agency - Ministry of Defence

- Seal of the Chief of Defence Staff

Department overview
- Formed: 1 January 2020; 6 years ago
- Headquarters: Secretariat
- Minister responsible: Rajnath Singh, Minister of Defence
- Deputy Minister responsible: Sanjay Seth, Minister of State for Defence
- Department executive: General N. S. Raja Subramani, Chief of Defence Staff and ex-officio Secretary
- Parent department: Ministry of Defence
- Website: https://www.dmamod.gov.in/

Department of Military Affairs (DMA) is the department in charge of military matters (Note: As compared to the Department of Defence which is in charge of defence matters of the country.) within the Indian Ministry of Defence. Headed by the Chief of Defence Staff, as its ex-officio secretary, the DMA provides integration between the Indian Armed Forces and the Ministry of Defence.

== Function ==
Consisting of military and civilian officers, the DMA promotes jointness in various areas such as procurement, training and staffing. The DMA deals with the tri-service Integrated Defence Staff (IDS) Headquarters, with the headquarters of the three armed forces, the Army, Air Force and Navy, the Territorial Army and certain procurement requirements. DMA also deals with promoting jointness through joint planning, facilitates restructuring for optimal utilisation of resources and promotes the use of indigenous equipment by the Services. The DMA, being under the Chief of Defence Staff also deals with the role and responsibilities assigned to the chief.

As per the Second Schedule to Government of India (Allocation of Business) Rules 1961, the following subjects were allocated to DMA:-

- The Armed Forces of the Union, namely, Army, Navy and Air Force.
- Integrated Headquarters of the Ministry of Defence comprising Army Headquarters, Naval Headquarters, Air Headquarters and Defence Staff Headquarters.
- The Territorial Army.
- Works relating to Army, Navy and Air Force.
- Procurement exclusive to the Services except capital acquisitions, as per prevalent rules and procedures.
- Promoting jointness in procurement, training and staffing for the Services through joint planning and integration of their requirements.
- Facilitation of restructuring of Military Commands for optimal utilisation of resources by bringing about jointness in operations, including through establishment of joint / theatre commands.
- Promoting use of indigenous equipment by the Services.

== Organisation ==
The department comes under the Ministry of Defence and is headed by the Chief of Defence Staff, who acts as its ex-officio secretary. In addition to the Chief of Defence Staff, the department comprises an additional secretary, five joint secretaries, thirteen deputy secretaries, and twenty-five under-secretaries.

Appointment	Incumbent	Branch	References
Chief of Defence Staff & Secretary (DMA)	General N. S. Raja Subramani, PVSM, AVSM, SM, VSM	Indian Armed Forces	
Additional Secretary	Air Marshal Vikram Gaur, AVSM, VSM		
Joint Secretary (Army & Territorial Army)	Major General G S Choudhry, AVSM, SM, VSM	Indian Army	
Joint Secretary (Navy & Defence Staff)	Rear Admiral Kunal Singh Rajkumar VSM	Indian Navy	
Joint Secretary (Air & Staff Duties)	Air Vice Marshal Vikram Gaur, AVSM, VSM	Indian Air Force	
Joint Secretary (Establishment & Coordination)	Anil Kumar Chhapolia	Indian Railway Personnel Service	
Joint Secretary (Works & Parliament Affairs)	Vacant	Indian Administrative Service	
