= Rajan Bakhshi =

Indian general

Lieutenant General Rajan Bakhshi is a retired Indian Army General, who previously had served as the General Officer Commanding in Chief of the Central Command, in Lucknow. Prior to the aforementioned post, he was General Officer Commanding of the Leh-based XIV Corps of the Indian Army.

== Early life and education ==
Lt Gen Rajan Bakhshi completed his school education at St. Xavier's School, Delhi and thereafter attended the Shri Ram College of Commerce, Delhi University.

== Military career ==
After attending the Indian Military Academy, Dehradun, Lt Gen Bakhshi was commissioned into the 17 Horse on 21 Dec 1975. He has served in various command and instructional appointments during his long career, including at the National Defence Academy, Khadakvasala, and is a graduate of the Defense Services Staff College, Wellington.
