= Pushpendra Pal Singh =

GOCinC Western Command

Lieutenant General Pushpendra Pal Singh AVSM SM**
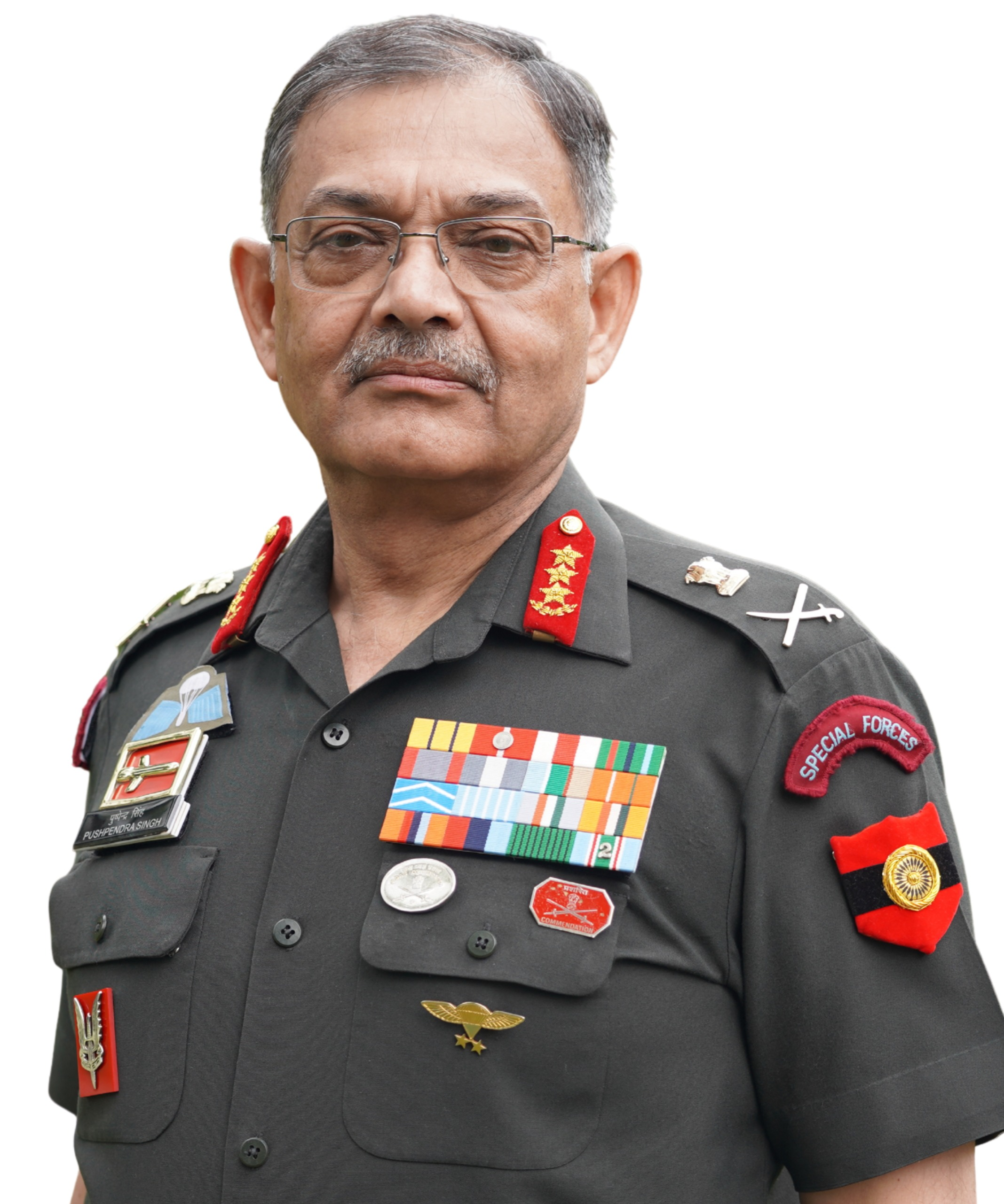

General Officer Commanding-in-Chief Western Command
- Incumbent
- Assumed office 1 April 2026
- Chief of Army Staff: Upendra Dwivedi
- Preceded by: Manoj Kumar Katiyar

48th Vice Chief of the Army Staff
- In office 1 August 2025 – 31 March 2026
- President: Droupadi Murmu
- Chief of Army Staff: Upendra Dwivedi
- Preceded by: N. S. Raja Subramani
- Succeeded by: Dhiraj Seth

Personal details
- Education: La Martinière College; Lucknow University

Military service
- Allegiance: India
- Branch/service: Indian Army
- Years of service: 19 December 1987 — Present
- Rank: Lieutenant General
- Unit: 4 Para SF
- Commands: Western Command; IX Corps; 4 Para SF
- Battles/wars: Operation Pawan; Operation Meghdoot; Operation Rakhskak; Operation Orchid
- Service number: IC-47139H
- Awards: Ati Vishisht Seva Medal; Bar to Sena Medal

Lieutenant General Pushpendra Pal Singh, AVSM, SM & bar is a serving general officer of the Indian Army. He currently serves as the General Officer Commanding-in-Chief, Western Command. He previously served as the 48th Vice Chief of the Army Staff. prior to that he was Director General of Operational Logistics & Strategic Movement. He earlier served as General Officer Commanding IX Corps, and as Chief of Staff, Central Command. He is also the Colonel of the Regiment of the Parachute Regiment since 1 November 2022.

== Early life and education ==
The general officer is an alumnus of La Martinière College, Lucknow and the Lucknow University. He then attended the Indian Military Academy, Dehradun. He also attended the Staff Course at Defence Services Staff College, Wellington, Higher Defence Management Course at College of Defence Management, Secunderabad and Advance Professional Programme in Public Administration at Indian Institute of Public Administration, New Delhi. He holds a master's in management studies from Osmania University and a master's in philosophy from Punjabi University.

== Military career ==
He was commissioned into the 4th battalion of the Parachute Regiment (Special Forces) on 19 December 1987 from the Indian Military Academy, Dehradun. In a career spanning over 37 years, he has tenanted various Command and Staff appointments and served across various operational, field and highly active Counter Insurgency area. He participated in numerous military operations, including Operation Pawan, Operation Meghdoot, Operation Rakshak and Operation Orchid. He also served in the United Nations under UNIFIL and Sri Lanka. He commanded a Special Forces Unit in the Kashmir Valley and on the Line of Control. As a brigadier, he served as the brigade commander of an Infantry Brigade and as a Major general, he has commanded a Mountain Division during 2020–2021 China–India skirmishes. Later on, he served as MG GS at headquarters Central Command. He has also served at the Infantry School, situated at Mhow and at the Strategic Forces Command.

After getting promoted to the rank of Lieutenant general, he assumed the appointment of Chief of Staff, Central Command. Later on, 14 April 2022, he took over as the General Officer Commanding IX Corps. A year later in June 2023, he was appointed as the Director General Operational Logistics & Strategic Movement.

On 1 August 2025, Lieutenant General Pushpendra Singh took over as the 48th Vice Chief of the Army Staff succeeding Lieutenant General N. S. Raja Subramani when the latter superannuated on 31 July 2025. He relinquished the appointment of Vice Chief of Army Staff on 30 March 2026. On 1 April 2026, he took over as the General Officer Commanding-in-Chief, Western Command succeeding Lieutenant General Manoj Kumar Katiyar who superannuated on 31 March 2026. He was instrumental in reverting the coveted Maroon Beret to Brigadiers and above ranked officers.

== Awards and decorations ==
The general officer has been awarded with the Ati Vishisht Seva Medal in 2025, the Sena Medal in 2015 and a Bar to Sena Medal (Note: Bar refers to same medal being awarded twice) in 2021. He has also been awarded with COAS Commendation card twice and Army Commander's commendation.

Ati Vishisht Seva Medal	Bar to Sena Medal	Wound Medal	Samanya Seva Medal
Special Service Medal	Siachen Glacier Medal	Operation Parakram Medal	Sainya Seva Medal
High Altitude Medal	Videsh Seva Medal	75th Independence Anniversary Medal	50th Independence Anniversary Medal
30 Years Long Service Medal	20 Years Long Service Medal	9 Years Long Service Medal	UNIFIL

== Dates of rank ==
Insignia	Rank	Component	Date of rank
	Second Lieutenant	Indian Army	19 December 1987
	Lieutenant	Indian Army	19 December 1989
	Captain	Indian Army	19 December 1992
	Major	Indian Army	19 December 1998
	Lieutenant Colonel	Indian Army	16 December 2004
	Colonel	Indian Army	1 January 2008
	Brigadier	Indian Army	14 February 2014 (acting); 5 December 2014 (substantive, seniority from 2 February 2012)
	Major General	Indian Army	1 October 2019 (seniority from 1 January 2018)
	Lieutenant General	Indian Army	9 December 2021

== Notes ==
Military offices
Preceded by Manoj Kumar Katiyar	General Officer Commanding-in-Chief; Western Command; 1 April 2026 – Present	Succeeded by Incumbent
Preceded by N. S. Raja Subramani	Vice Chief of the Army Staff; 1 July 2025 – 31 March 2026	Succeeded by Dhiraj Seth
Preceded by Rahul R Singh	Director General; Operational Logistics & Strategic Movement; 9 June 2023 – 31 July 2025	Succeeded by Sanjay Mitra
Preceded by P N Ananthanarayanan	General Officer Commanding; IX Corps; 14 April 2022 – 8 June 2023	Succeeded by Shrinjay Pratap Singh
