= Chief of Defence Staff (India) =

Overall professional head of the Indian Armed Forces

- Flag of the Chief of Defence Staff

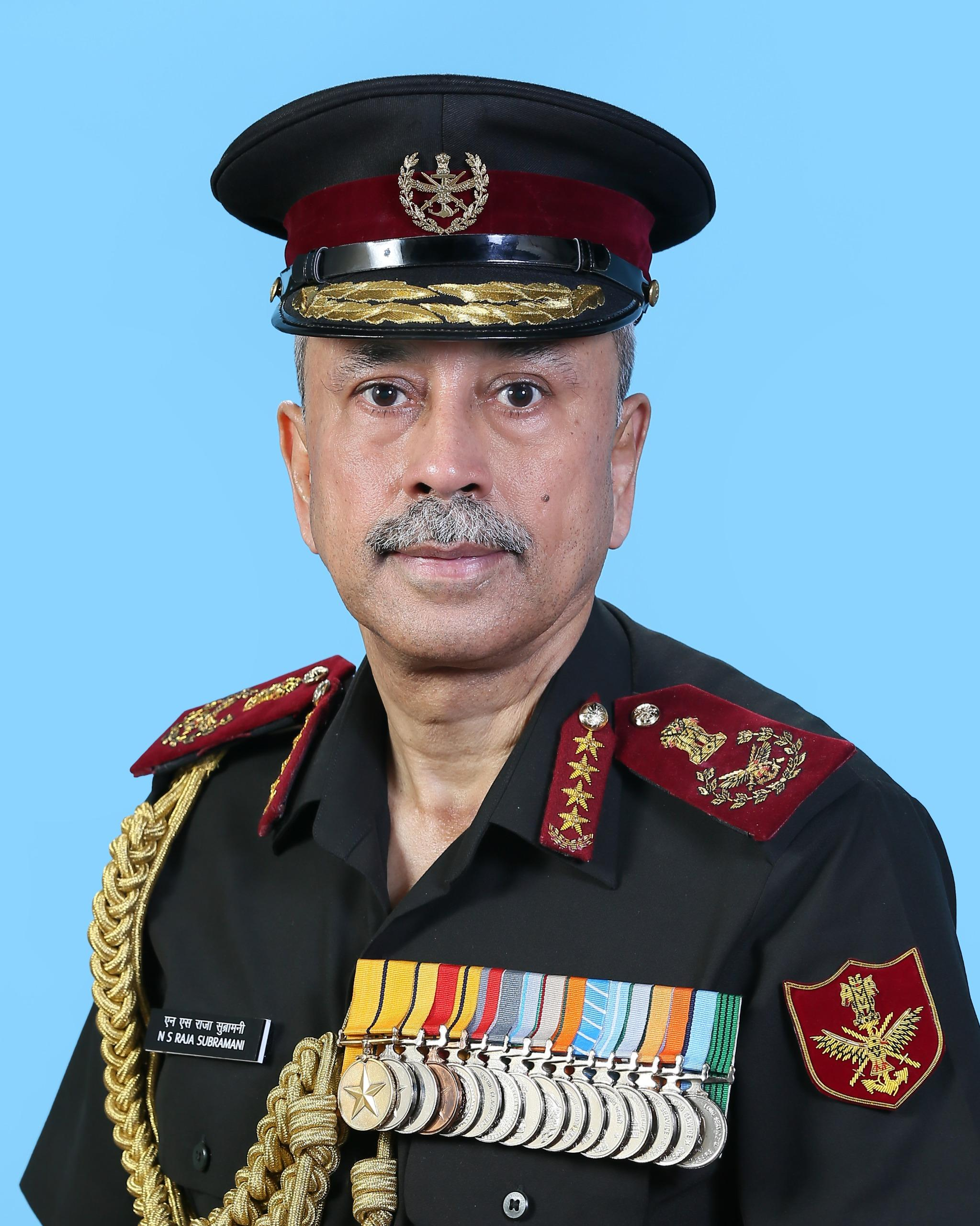
- Incumbent; General N. S. Raja Subramani; PVSM AVSM SM VSM since 31 May 2026
- Indian Armed Forces
- Type: Chief of Defence
- Status: Chief of the Indian Armed Forces.
- Abbreviation: CDS
- Member of: Chiefs of Staff Committee; Defence Acquisition Council; Department of Military Affairs; National Security Council; Nuclear Command Authority
- Reports to: President of India; Prime Minister of India; Minister of Defence
- Residence: Residence 3, Kamraj Ln, Meena Bagh, Krishna Manon Lane Area, New Delhi
- Seat: Room No 104. Department of Military Affairs, Ministry of Defence, South Block, Secretariat Building, New Delhi
- Appointer: Appointments Committee of the Cabinet President of India
- Term length: No fixed duration, only from appointment till the age of 65.
- Formation: 1 January 2020; 6 years ago
- First holder: General Bipin Rawat, PVSM UYSM AVSM YSM SM VSM ADC
- Deputy: Chief of Integrated Defence Staff (CISC)
- Salary: ₹250,000 (US$2,600) monthly
- Website: Official website

The Chief of Defence Staff (CDS) is the professional head of the Indian Armed Forces. The CDS is the highest-ranking military officer in service, responsible for overseeing inter-service jointness across all disciplines related to military functioning. Primarily, the office operates on a status of primus inter pares i.e., first among equals with the chiefs of the three services, and functions as the Permanent-Chairman of the Chiefs of Staff Committee (COSC) – the inter-service syndicate responsible for ensuring the establishment and preservation of military integration.

Statutorily, the CDS is the Secretary to the Government of India of the Department of Military Affairs, the civil-cum-military entity responsible for fostering professional coordination between the services, and by extension, is also the principal military advisor to the nation’s civilian leadership i.e., the Ministry of Defence on affairs privy to inter-service integration; as such, the office exists primarily as an advisor and adjudicator position, endowed with no operational command control.

Since its formal creation in 2020, the CDS has been officiated on a rotational basis by four-star officers nominated from any of the three services. Domestically, the office ranks 12th-overall in the Indian order of precedence, and is the status-equivalent of the Chief of the Army Staff, the Chief of the Naval Staff and the Chief of the Air Staff; internationally, it is identical to the United Kingdom's Chief of the Defence Staff.

== Description ==
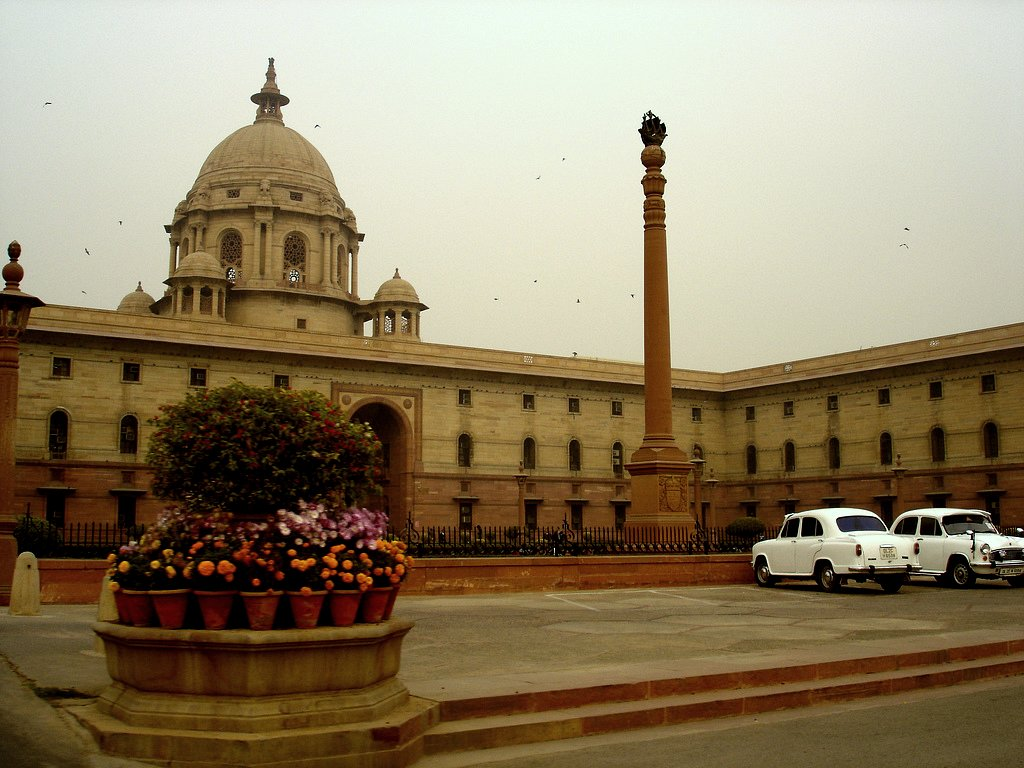
The South Block, Central Secretariat, New Delhi - where the CDS is seated.

=== Mandate ===
As the principal military authority of the Indian Armed Forces, the CDS bears responsibility for overseeing two distinct bodies, namely, the Chiefs of Staff Committee (COSC) and the Department of Military Affairs (DMA).

==== Chiefs of Staff Committee ====
The COSC is an inter-service syndicate of the armed forces, which functions as a principal advisory body dealing with matters related to inter-service coordination, policy formulation, and strategy development. It comprises the chiefs of the three armed services, in addition to the CDS, who acts as its Permanent Chairman, responsible for the following duties:

- Acting as the principal military advisor to the Minister of Defence on all affairs related to inter-service integration, coherence, and functioning.
- Participating as a member of the Defence Acquisition Council chaired by Minister of Defence and Defence Planning Committee chaired by National Security Advisor.
- Exercising command authority over specific inter-service organisations/agencies/commands, namely, the Defence Cyber Agency (DCyA), the Defence Space Agency, and the Armed Forces Special Operations Division vis-à-vis the Integrated Defence Staff (IDS).
- Functioning as the Military Adviser to the Nuclear Command Authority.
- Ensuring jointness in operation, logistics, transport, training, support services, communications, repairs, and maintenance of the three armed services.
- Assigning inter-service prioritisation to capital acquisition proposals based on the anticipated budget. And ensure optimal utilisation of infrastructure and rationalise it through jointness amongst the services.
- Implementing Five-Year Defence Capital Acquisition Plan and Two-Year roll-on Annual Acquisition Plans, as a follow-up of Integrated Capability Development Plan.

==== Department of Military Affairs ====
The DMA is one of the five departments within the Ministry of Defence, which functions as a joint civilian-cum-military syndicate tasked with overseeing administrative duties related to the headquarters of the three armed services, the Integrated Defence Staff (IDS) plus the Territorial Army, and procurement initiatives except for capital acquisitions. Herein, the CDS acts as the department's ex-officio Secretary, responsible for the following duties:

- Answering Parliament on all affairs exclusively related to the armed forces.
- Facilitating the restructuring of service-specific military commands to ensure the optimal utilization of resources by fostering jointness in operations, principally through the establishment of joint-service theatre commands.
- Promoting jointness in procurement, training, and staffing for the three armed services through joint planning and integration of their respective requirements.

=== Ambiguities ===
Although the CDS is recognised as the principal authority in the armed forces, the office has been noted to have several ambiguities as to its perceived powers and roles:

- The Ministry of Defence is categorised into five departments, of which the Defence Secretary heads the Department of Defence, whilst the CDS heads the Department of Military Affairs. However, the Cabinet Secretariat – Manual of Office Procedures, from which the Defence Secretary's powers are derived, states that the office "is the principal adviser of the Minister on all matters of policy and administration within his Ministry/Department, and his responsibility is complete and undivided"; thus, the manual would have indicated the Defence Secretary the officer responsible for the Ministry of Defence's five departments, including the Department of Military Affairs, which obscures the clarity of the powers held by the CDS.
- The mandate for defence of India lies with the Department of Defence but procurement initiatives except capital acquisitions lies with CDS-led Department of Military Affairs; this gives birth to a dichotomy where on one hand CDS is expected to prioritise the expenditure between the three services but the wherewithal still lies with the Defence Secretary.

=== Promotion ===
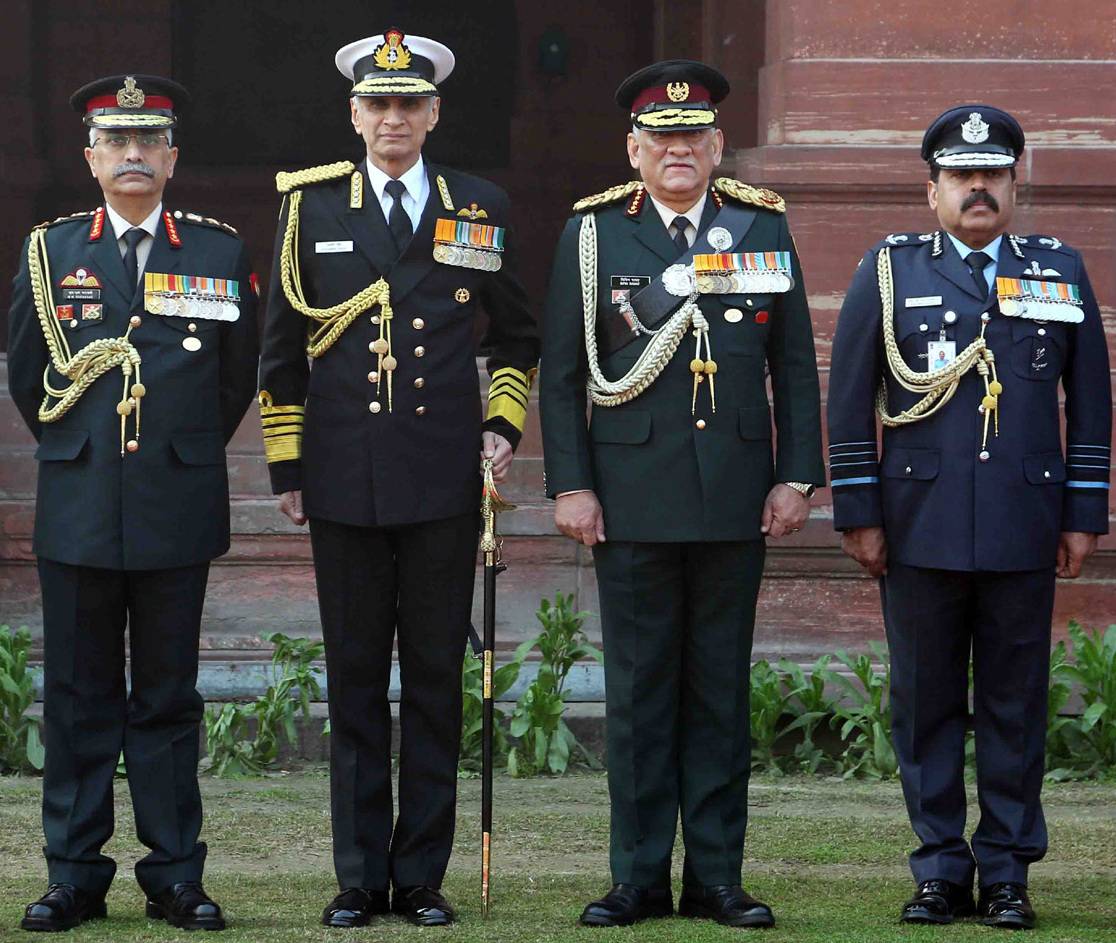
General Bipin Rawat the first CDS, second-from-right, along with the three service chiefs in January 2020; his later acting successor, General M. M. Naravane, is seen far-left.

The office of CDS has customarily been held by a four-star officer from the three-armed services, specifically, either a general, admiral, or air chief marshal. The appointment of the CDS is initiated by Ministry of Defence, wherein the résumés of candidates recommended by the armed services are submitted for review, before being sent to the Appointments Committee of the Cabinet.

At the time of the office's creation, no fixed structure for an order of succession existed; thus, in the formative period of the office's existence, the senior-most service chief was recommended for appointment; the first instance of this was General Bipin Rawat, the then Chief of the Army Staff and senior-most amongst the three service chiefs. However, Rawat's unexpected death in 2021 whilst in tenure exposed this flaw and left the office vacant for nine months before a successor. Accordingly, in June 2022, the Ministry of Defence established a permanent set of appointment-cum-succession rules, stating that four-star and three-star officers from the armed services, notwithstanding their status of being active or retired, would be deemed eligible candidates to be appointed, provided they hadn't attained the age of 62 at the time of appointment.

As of 2022, the appointment regulations for CDS, whilst the same for the three services, are classified distinctively, namely:

- Indian Army: Army (Amendment) Rules, 2022
- Indian Navy: Naval Ceremonial, Conditions of Service and Miscellaneous (Amendment) Regulations, 2022
- Indian Air Force: Air Force (Amendment) Regulations, 2022

The first time the regulations were actively exercised was in the appointment of Lieutenant General Anil Chauhan in September 2022; Chauhan, who had retired in May 2021, was recalled to service and promoted to general.

=== Tenure ===
Under an initial set of regulations established by the Ministry of Defence in December 2019, the service chiefs from the three services, namely, the Chief of the Army Staff, the Chief of the Naval Staff and the Chief of the Air Staff, having completed their mandated three-year tenure or having attained the age of 62, were deemed eligible to be appointed CDS, with the chosen designate tenuring the office to the maximum deemed age of 65; unlike the service chiefs, the CDS has no fixed tenure, but only an upper age limit. The aforementioned 2022 regulations expanded the office's reach, allowing both active and retired officers to occupy the office until the age of 65.

Previously, in the event of an abrupt stoppage during the incumbent's tenure - by termination, resignation or sudden demise, the senior-most service chief was made acting-COSC and by extension, an ex officio-CDS until a suitable successor was appointed; this situation has occurred only once, when General Manoj Mukund Naravane, then-Chief of the Army Staff, was made acting-COSC upon the death of General Rawat, the then-incumbent CDS.

== Insignia ==
=== Command flag ===
The office of CDS maintains a separate command flag, regardless of the incumbent appointee's parent service, symbolising the independence of the position and its associated authority from the armed services. The flag comprising a maroon field - representing the inter-service jointness, furnished with the National Flag of India in the canton and the inter-service insignia of the Indian Armed Forces - comprising twin-crossed swords, an unfouled anchor and an eagle surrounded by an oak wreath in gold-furnishing. Similar to that of the service chiefs, this particular command flag is preferably displayed on the CDS's official car and at his office.

=== Accoutrements ===
Whilst the CDS is a rotational appointment held by officers drawn from the three armed services, the CDS is an independent entity, thus mandating a distinct set of accoutrements. Notably, the CDS uniform allows the appointee to retain certain paraphernalia, such as the uniform of the appointee's parent service and its associated decorations; nonetheless, it lacks a lanyard, unlike the uniforms of the service chiefs. In addition, the office's uniform has several distinct emendations, the primary of which are undermentioned:

| Item | Image | Description |
|---|---|---|
| Epaulette | | Maroon shoulder epaulette attached with the State Emblem of India atop the inter-service insignia of the Indian Armed Forces surrounded by an oak wreath, in gold-furnishing. |
| Service cap | | Peak cap of the appointee's parent service, with an additional maroon band attached with the inter-service insignia surrounded by an oak wreath, in gold-furnishing. |
| Belt buckle | | Silver buckle designed with the inter-service insignia surrounded by an oak wreath, in gold-furnishing. |
| Button | | Gold-coloured button furnished solely with inter-service insignia. |

== Appointees ==
The undermentioned table chronicles the appointees to the office of Chief of Defence Staff beginning from 1 January 2020 to the present-day. Ranks and honours are as at the completion of their tenure.

Key

† denotes people who died in office.

* denotes veteran recalled to active service.

| No. | Portrait | Name | Assumed office | Left office | Time in office | Service branch | Preceding office | Ref. |
|---|---|---|---|---|---|---|---|---|
| 1 | Bipin RawatPVSM UYSM AVSM YSM SM VSM† | General; Bipin Rawat; PVSM UYSM AVSM YSM SM VSM† (1958–2021) | 1 January 2020 | 8 December 2021 ‽ | 1 year, 341 days | Indian Army | Chief of the Army Staff (31 December 2016 – 31 December 2019) | |
Vacant (9 December 2021–29 September 2022)
| 2 | Anil Chauhan* PVSM UYSM AVSM SM VSM | General; Anil Chauhan*; PVSM UYSM AVSM SM VSM (born 1961) | 30 September 2022 | 30 May 2026 | 3 years, 242 days | Indian Army | General Officer Commanding-in-Chief, Eastern Command (1 September 2019 – 31 May 2021) | |
| 3 | N. S. Raja Subramani* PVSM AVSM SM VSM | General; N. S. Raja Subramani*; PVSM AVSM SM VSM (born 1965) | 31 May 2026 | Incumbent | 102 days | Indian Army | Vice Chief of the Army Staff (1 July 2024 – 31 July 2025) | |

Tally of CDS-officeholders from the Armed Forces
| Branch | Count |
| Indian Army | 3 |
| Indian Navy | 0 |
| Indian Air Force | 0 |

== See also ==
=== Inter-service offices ===
- Chairman of the Chiefs of Staff Committee
- Chief of Integrated Defence Staff

=== Other offices of the Indian Armed Forces ===
- Chief of the Army Staff
- Chief of the Naval Staff
- Chief of the Air Staff

=== International equivalents ===
- Chief of the Defence Staff, British Armed Forces
- Chairman Joint Chiefs of Staff Committee, Pakistan Armed Forces
- Chairman of the Joint Chiefs of Staff, United States Armed Forces
