= Yogendra Dimri =

Retired Indian Army General

Lieutenant General Yogendra Dimri PVSM, AVSM, VSM
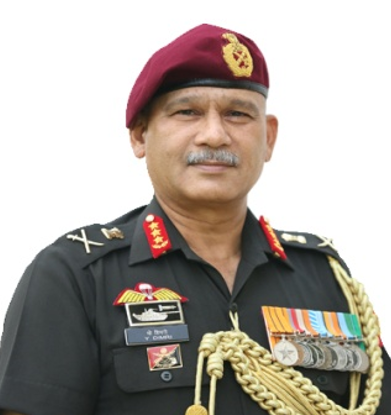
- Born: Chamoli, Uttarakhand, India
- Alma mater: National Defence Academy; Indian Military Academy; Defence Services Staff College; Defence Services Command and Staff College; Army War College, Mhow
- Military career
- Allegiance: India
- Branch: Indian Army
- Service years: 17 December 1983 – 28 February 2023
- Rank: Lieutenant general
- Service number: IC-41461Y
- Commands: Central Command; XXI Corps; Defence Services Staff College; United Nations Transitional Authority, Cambodia
- Awards: Param Vishisht Seva Medal; Ati Vishisht Seva Medal; Vishisht Seva Medal

Lieutenant General Yogendra Dimri, PVSM, AVSM, VSM is a former General Officer in the Indian Army. He last served as the General Officer Commanding-in-Chief of the Central Command in April 2021. He previously served as a Corps Commander and as Chief of Staff of the Western Command, he was appointed as a military attaché in the United Nations Transitional Authority in Cambodia and directing staff at the Defence Services Staff College.

Prior to his appointment to the Central Command, he commanded XXI Corps and infantry brigade on the Line of Control (LOC).

== Biography ==
Dimri was commissioned into the Indian military's regiment Bombay Engineer Group on 17 December 1983. He did his schooling from St. Joseph's College, Allahabad and St. Aloysius Senior Secondary School in Jabalpur. He obtained his professional courses from the various institutions such as National Defence Academy in Khadakwasla, Indian Military Academy, Defence Services Staff College, Defence Services Command and Staff College and the Army War College, Mhow.

He was the recipient of the Silver Grenade in the Young Officers Course and the Gold Medal in the military Engineers Degree Course. He was also awarded President's Gold Medal at the Indian Military Academy for qualifying with "first" in the order of merit.

He also served at staff and instructional posts such as brigadier general at Staff Operations of a Corps and deputy director general for Military Operations at the Integrated Defence Staff of the Ministry of Defence.

== Awards and decorations ==
He was awarded the Vishisht Seva Medal in 2016, the Ati Vishisht Seva Medal in 2019. and the Param Vishisht Seva Medal in 2023.

	Param Vishisht Seva Medal	Ati Vishisht Seva Medal	
Vishisht Seva Medal	Special Service Medal	Operation Parakram Medal	Sainya Seva Medal
High Altitude Service Medal	Videsh Seva Medal	75th Independence Anniversary Medal	50th Anniversary of Independence Medal
30 Years Long Service Medal	20 Years Long Service Medal	9 Years Long Service Medal	UN Transitional Authority, Cambodia

== Dates of rank ==
Insignia	Rank	Component	Date of rank
	Second Lieutenant	Indian Army	17 December 1983
	Lieutenant	Indian Army	17 December 1985
	Captain	Indian Army	17 December 1988
	Major	Indian Army	17 December 1994
	Lieutenant-Colonel	Indian Army	16 December 2004
	Colonel	Indian Army	15 March 2006
	Brigadier	Indian Army	1 September 2010 (acting, substantive 1 December 2010 with seniority from 28 August 2009)
	Major General	Indian Army	1 February 2016 (substantive, seniority from 23 August 2014)
	Lieutenant-General	Indian Army	1 May 2018

Military offices
Preceded by Iqroop Singh Ghuman	General Officer Commanding-in-Chief Central Command; 1 April 2021 - 28 February 2023	Succeeded by N. S. Raja Subramani
