= N. S. Raja Subramani =

3rd Chief of Defence Staff (India)

General N. S. Raja Subramani PVSM AVSM SM VSM
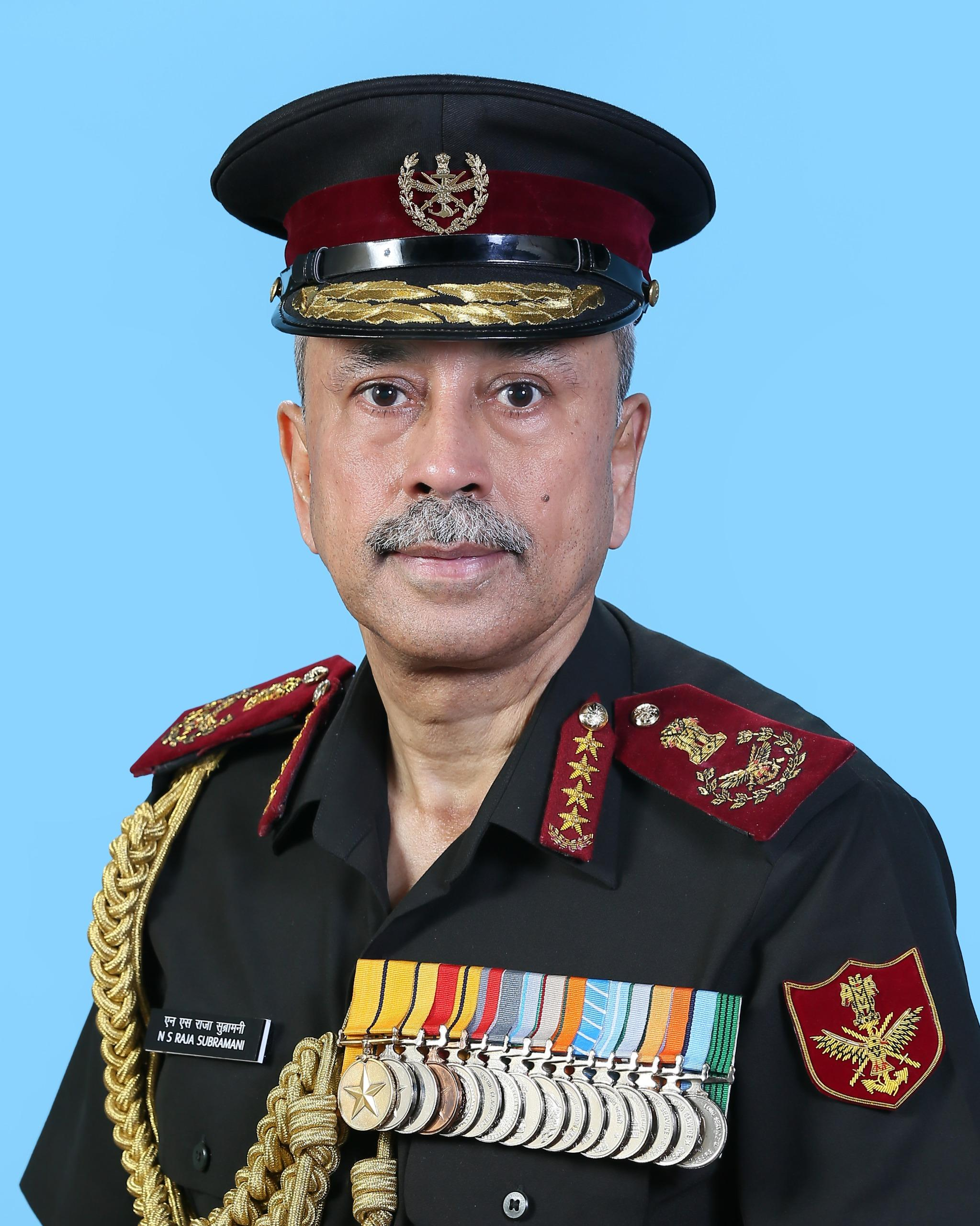
- Official portrait, 2026

3rd Chief of Defence Staff
- Incumbent
- Assumed office 31 May 2026
- President: Droupadi Murmu
- Minister of Defence: Rajnath Singh
- Preceded by: Anil Chauhan

59th Chairman of the Chiefs of Staff Committee
- Incumbent
- Assumed office 31 May 2026
- President: Droupadi Murmu
- Minister of Defence: Rajnath Singh
- Preceded by: Anil Chauhan

47th Vice Chief of the Army Staff
- In office 1 July 2024 – 31 July 2025
- President: Droupadi Murmu
- Chief of Army Staff: Upendra Dwivedi
- Preceded by: Upendra Dwivedi
- Succeeded by: Pushpendra Pal Singh

General Officer Commanding-in-Chief Central Command
- In office 1 March 2023 – 30 June 2024
- Chief of Army Staff: Manoj Pande
- Preceded by: Yogendra Dimri
- Succeeded by: Anindya Sengupta

Personal details
- Born: 21 July 1965 (age 61)
- Spouse: Mahalakshmi Subramani

Military service
- Allegiance: India
- Branch/service: Indian Army
- Years of service: 14 December 1985 – 31 July 2025; 31 May 2026 – Present (as CDS)
- Rank: General
- Unit: 8 Garhwal Rifles
- Commands: Central Command; II Corps; Uttar Bharat Area; 17th Mountain Division; 168 Infantry Brigade; 16 Garhwal Rifles
- Service number: IC-43245K
- Awards: Param Vishisht Seva Medal; Ati Vishisht Seva Medal; Sena Medal; Vishisht Seva Medal

General N. S. Raja Subramani, PVSM, AVSM, SM, VSM (born 21 July 1965) is a four-star general of the Indian Army. He currently serves as the 3rd Chief of Defence Staff of the Indian Armed Forces and as Secretary, Department of Military Affairs. He previously served as the Military Adviser to National Security Council Secretariat prior to which he served as the 47th Vice Chief of the Army Staff. He earlier served as the General Officer Commanding-in-Chief, Central Command,as the Chief of Staff of the Northern Command and as General Officer Commanding II corps. He also served as General Officer Commanding Uttar Bharat Area.

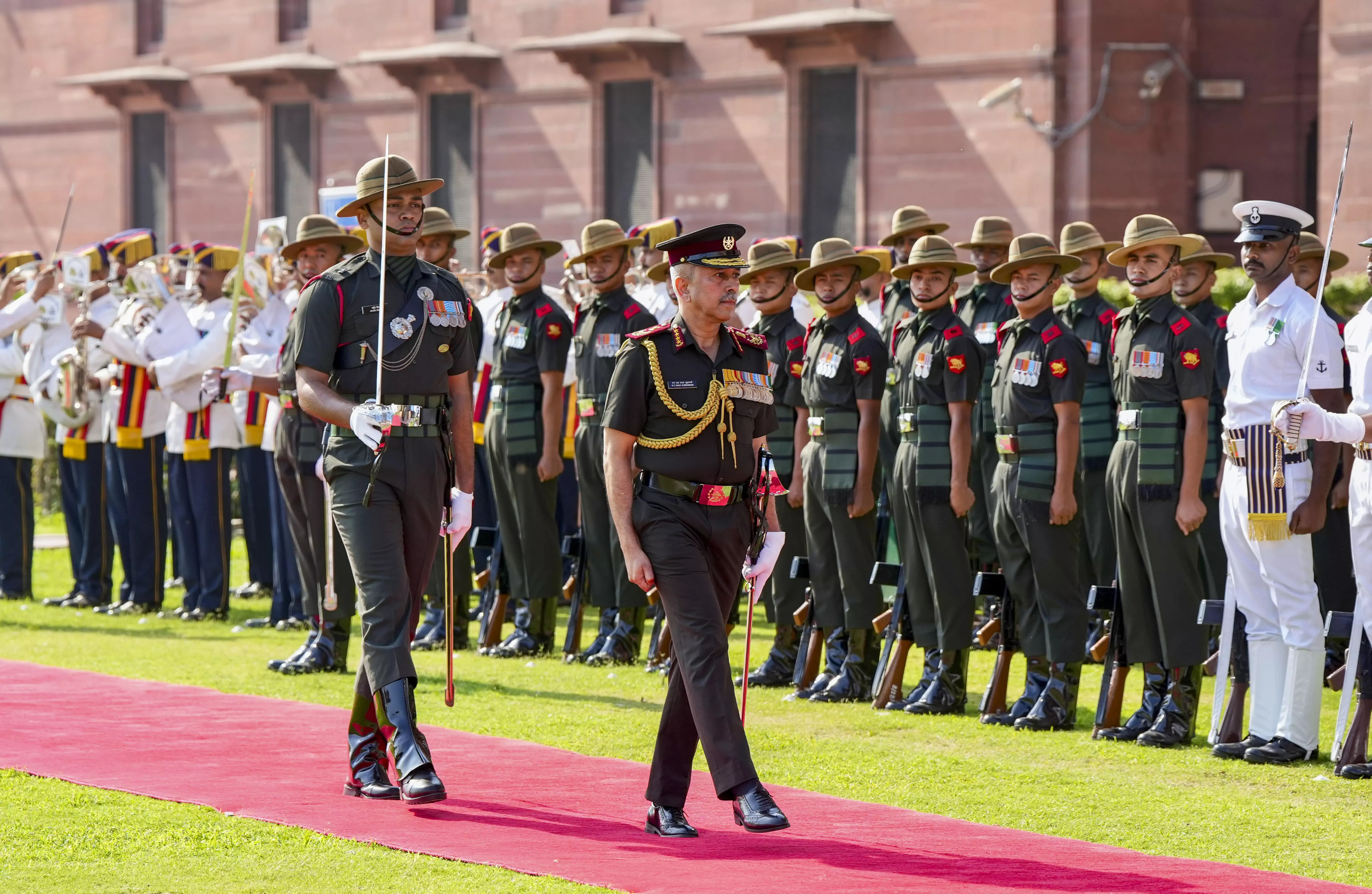
General Raja Subramani receiving a guard of honour on assuming charge as the Chief of Defence Staff

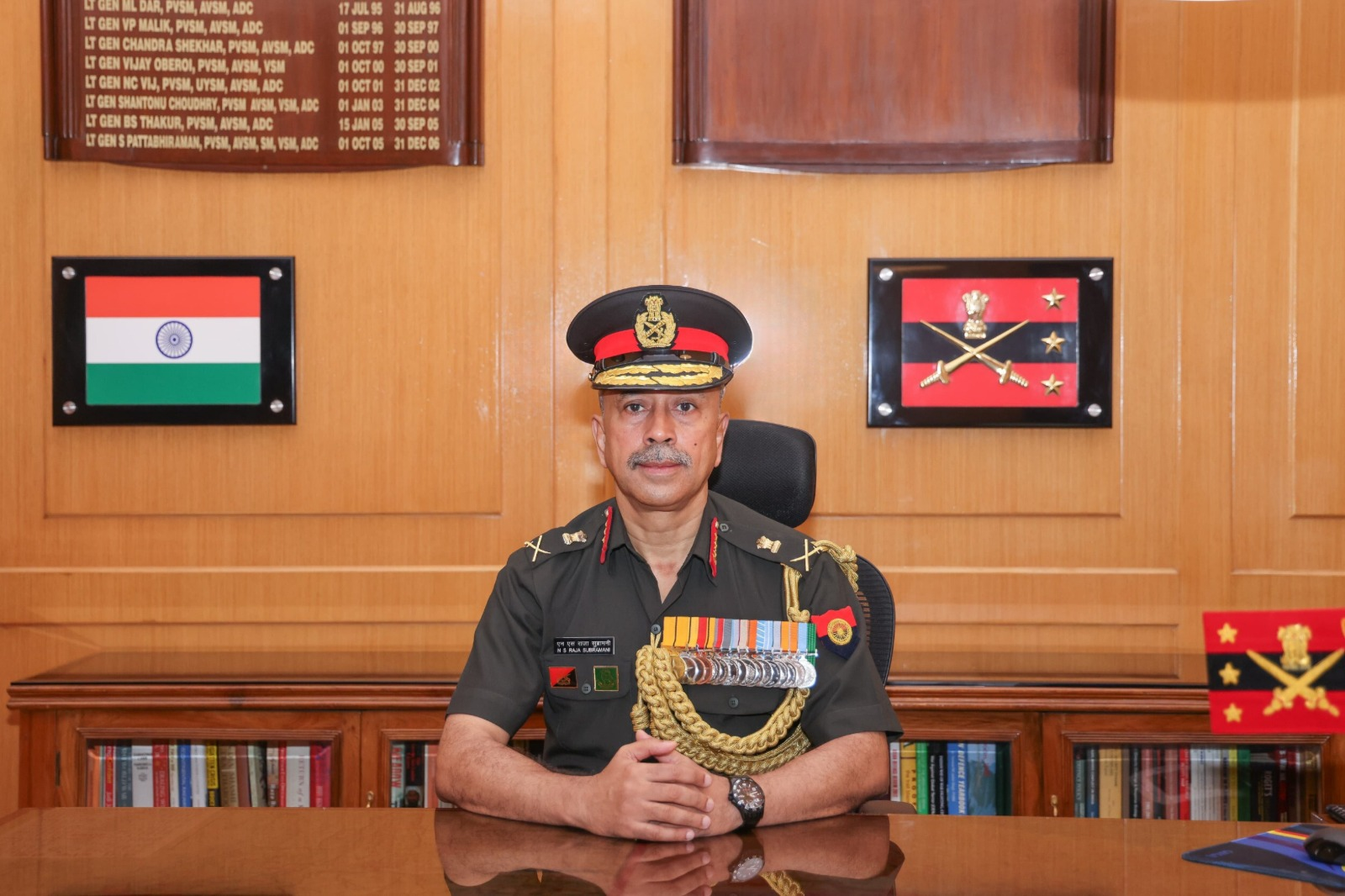
Gen Raja Subramani as VCOAS

== Early life and education ==
The general officer is an alumnus of the 67th course of the National Defence Academy and the 77th course of the Indian Military Academy. The General Officer also attended the Joint Services Command Staff College, Bracknell (UK) and National Defence College, New Delhi. He later studied at King's College London and earned Master of Arts Degree from University of London and an M Phil in Defence Studies from University of Madras.

== Military career ==
He was commissioned into the 8th battalion of the Garhwal Rifles on 14 December 1985. In a career spanning over four decades, he has tenanted various command, staff & instructional appointments. He served as a Divisional officer at his alma-mater, the National Defence Academy. He then attended the Joint Services Command and Staff College in Bracknell, United Kingdom. After completing the course, he returned to India and was appointed Brigade major of a mountain brigade and later commanded the 16th battalion of the Garhwal Rifles in Assam. The battalion was deployed in a counter-insurgency role as part of Operation Rhino. He was subsequently appointed as the Defence attaché at the Embassy of India in Astana, Kazakhstan. In the rank of Colonel, he also served as the Assistant Military Secretary in the MS branch at Army headquarters, as the Colonel General Staff (Operations) at Headquarters Eastern Command and later as the Deputy Commander of a Rashtriya Rifles sector in Jammu and Kashmir.

On promotion to the rank of Brigadier, he commanded the 168 Infantry Brigade in Samba. He was then selected to attend the National Defence College in New Delhi, as part of the 55th course. After the course, he took charge as Deputy Director General Military Intelligence (DDGMI) at Army HQ. He subsequently served as the Brigadier General Staff (Operations) at Eastern Command.

=== General officer ===
The general officer was promoted to the rank of Major General and appointed General Officer Commanding 17th Mountain Division in Sikkim. After completing his tenure, he moved to the Defence Services Staff College, Wellington as the Chief Instructor (Army). After getting promoted to the rank of Lieutenant General on 3 February 2020, he was appointed General Officer Commanding, Uttar Bharat Area. On 12 February 2021, Lieutenant General Raja Subramani took over as the General Officer Commanding II Corps succeeding Lieutenant General Surinder Singh Mahal. After a year-long tenure, he moved to the Northern Command in Udhampur as the Chief of Staff taking over on 10 May 2022.

On 1 March 2023, Lieutenant General N. S. Raja Subramani took over as General Officer Commanding-in-Chief Central Command succeeding Lieutenant General Yogendra Dimri who superannuated on 28 February 2023.

On 1 July 2024, Lieutenant General N. S. Raja Subramani took over as the 47th Vice Chief of the Army Staff. He assumed the post from General Upendra Dwivedi upon his elevation as the Chief of Army Staff. Following his retirement from active military service, the Government of India appointed him as the Military Adviser to the National Security Council Secretariat (NSCS) assuming charge on 1 September 2025.

=== Chief of the Defence Staff ===
On 9 May 2026, the Government of India appointed Lieutenant General N. S. Raja Subramani as the next Chief of Defence Staff marking his return to active military service. On 31 May 2026, General Raja Subramani took over as the 3rd Chief of Defence Staff and Secretary, Department of Military Affairs succeeding General Anil Chauhan, who superannuated after more than four decades of service.

== Awards and decorations ==
During his career, the general officer has been awarded the Param Vishisht Seva Medal in 2024, the Ati Vishisht Seva Medal in 2020, the Sena Medal in 2005 and the Vishisht Seva Medal in 2015.

Param Vishisht Seva Medal	Ati Vishisht Seva Medal	Sena Medal	Vishisht Seva Medal
Special Service Medal	Siachen Glacier Medal	Operation Vijay Medal	Operation Parakram Medal
Sainya Seva Medal	High Altitude Medal	Videsh Seva Medal	75th Independence Anniversary Medal
50th Independence Anniversary Medal	30 Years Long Service Medal	20 Years Long Service Medal	9 Years Long Service Medal

== Dates of rank ==
Insignia	Rank	Component	Date of rank
	Second Lieutenant	Indian Army	14 December 1985
	Lieutenant	Indian Army	14 December 1987
	Captain	Indian Army	14 December 1990
	Major	Indian Army	14 December 1996
	Lieutenant Colonel	Indian Army	16 December 2004
	Colonel	Indian Army	15 August 2006
	Brigadier	Indian Army	27 April 2012 (acting); 13 August 2012 (substantive, with seniority from 28 October 2010)
	Major General	Indian Army	2 January 2018 (seniority from 1 June 2015)
	Lieutenant General	Indian Army	3 February 2020
	General (CDS)	Indian Armed Forces	31 May 2026

Military offices
Preceded by Anil Chauhan	Chief of Defence Staff; 31 May 2026 – Present	Succeeded by Incumbent
Preceded by Upendra Dwivedi	Vice Chief of the Army Staff; 1 July 2024 – 31 July 2025	Succeeded by Pushpendra Pal Singh
Preceded by Yogendra Dimri	General Officer Commanding-in-Chief; Central Command; 1 March 2023 - 30 June 2024	Succeeded by Anindya Sengupta
Preceded by S. Harimohan Iyer	Chief of Staff, Northern Command; 10 May 2022 - 28 February 2023	Succeeded by Anindya Sengupta
Preceded by Surinder Singh Mahal	General Officer Commanding; II Corps; 12 February 2021 – 21 March 2022	Succeeded by Pratik Sharma
Preceded by Chandi Prasad Mohanty	General Officer Commanding; Uttar Bharat Area; 2020 - 2021	Succeeded by Surinder Singh Mahal
