= Jointness =

Cooperation of military branches

Jointness is a neologism coined by the United States Armed Forces to describe cross-service cooperation in all stages of the military processes, from research, through procurement and into operations. Today, it is accepted by many advanced militaries. Jointness is aimed at satisfying the requirements for increasing efficiency and economizing the military budget.

"Jointness" has been defined as "the integration of the strengths of at least two limbs of the military in a coordinated effort to achieve a common goal". Jointness is an important factor in developing Joint Operations. It enables flexible leadership for the commander of a group, increases effective functioning, and creates an involvement between military limbs.

Jointness also creates the possibility for a new manner of warfare called Network-centric warfare. Network-centric Warfare is characterized by the representation and analysis of information, and its transfer between agents and the center of command who may be distant from one another or even members of different units in the military. This new technology and outlook enable the military to improve operational efficiency in a way that was not possible in the past. What began as a gradual technological advancement within individual military limbs has grown to include several branches of the armed forces.

This approach views jointness as key for proceeding flexibly in a changing world. It stresses conceptual flexibility which is obtained through the development of new mindsets and which precedes flexibility of power and resource.
