= Western Command (India) =

Indian army command

- Insignia of the Western Command
- Active: 1904 – 1908; 1920 – 1938; 1948 – present
- Country: British India (former); India (after 1947)
- Branch: British Indian Army (former); Indian Army (after 1947)
- Type: Command
- Garrison/HQ: Chandimandir, Panchkula district, Haryana
- Motto: Ever Westwards

Commanders
- Current commander: Lt Gen Pushpendra Pal Singh AVSM, SM**
- Notable commanders: FM K. M. Cariappa; Gen S M Shrinagesh; Gen K. S. Thimayya; Gen P. N. Thapar; FM Sam Manekshaw; Lt Gen Harbaksh Singh; Lt Gen K. P. Candeth; Gen T. N. Raina; Gen K. V. Krishna Rao; Lt Gen Srinivas Kumar Sinha; Gen Krishnaswamy Sundarji; Gen S. F. Rodrigues; Gen B. C. Joshi; Gen J. J. Singh

Insignia
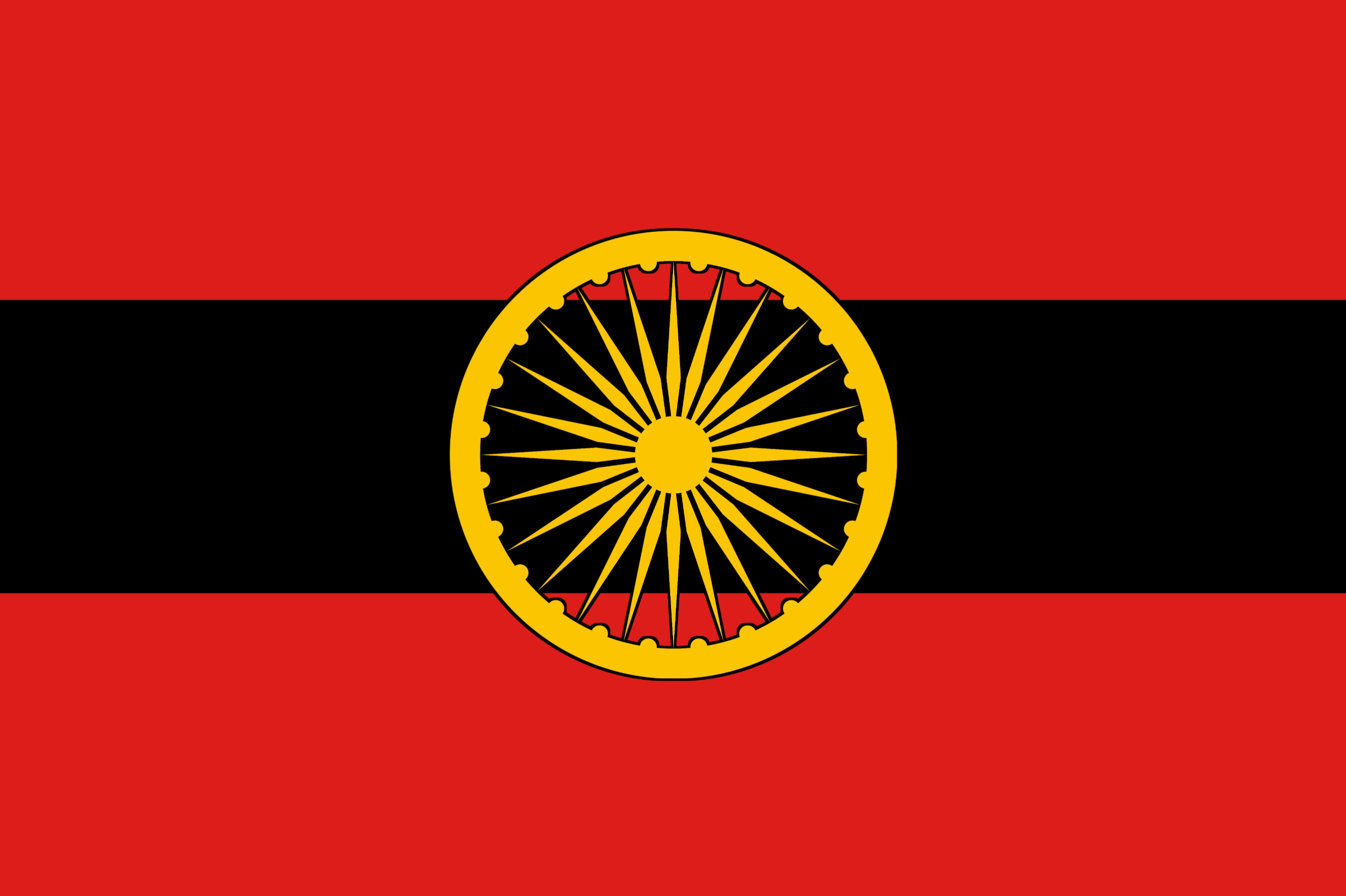
- Flag

Western Command is a Command-level formation of the Indian Army. It was formed in 1920. It was disbanded following its demotion to an independent district and eventual merge with Northern Command to form the North-western Army. It was re-raised in 1947 following the transfer of Northern Command HQ to Pakistan. Until 1972, it was responsible for India's border with Pakistan in the North and West and the Chinese border in the North. The Command HQ is located at Chandimandir, Haryana, about 5 km east of Panchkula-Chandigarh.

Lieutenant General Pushpendra Pal Singh is the present Western Army Commander since 1 April 2026.

== History ==
=== Pre-Independence ===
The Presidency armies were abolished with effect from 1 April 1895 when the three Presidency armies of Bengal, Bombay, and Madras became the Indian Army. The Indian Army was divided into four Commands: Bengal Command, Bombay Command, Madras Command and Punjab Command, each under a lieutenant general.

Between 1904 and 1908, the Bombay Command was renamed as the Western Command. In 1908, the four commands were merged into two Armies: Northern Army and Southern Army as recommended by then Commander-in-Chief, Indian Army Lord Kitchener. This system persisted until 1920 when the arrangement reverted to four commands again: Eastern Command, Northern Command, Southern Command and Western Command.

In 1937, Western Command was downgraded to become the Western Independent District commanded by a major general. In April 1942, the Western Independent District was absorbed in the Northern Command which itself was re-designated as North Western Army.

=== Re-raising ===
After the partition of India, the erstwhile command HQ, Northern Command, went to Pakistan and was renamed as GHQ, Pakistan. The communal violence of partition necessitated the raising of a new command headquarters to relieve Army Headquarters of the day to day overseeing of operations of the two independent areas in north India.

This command, initially named Delhi and East Punjab Command was raised in Delhi on 14 September 1947 with Lt Gen Sir Dudley Russell as its commander. It was responsible to administer the Delhi Independent Area and the East Punjab Independent Area.

On 26 October 1947, following the accession of Jammu and Kashmir to India, Western Command was put in charge of all Indian Army operations to secure the area for India.

Initially a division sized force, Jammu and Kashmir Division was raised on 5 November 1947 under Maj Gen Kulwant Singh for overseeing operations in Jammu and Kashmir. This was later split into two parts Jammu Division (under Maj Gen Atma Singh) and Srinagar Division (under Maj Gen K.S. Thimayya) to oversee operations in Jammu and Kashmir respectively.

The II Corps (Ambala), IX Corps (Yol), XI Corps (Jalandhar) and 40th Artillery Division (Ambala) are control operational units in Western Command.

== Structure ==
Command's Area Of Responsibility (AOR) covers the states of Punjab, Haryana, Delhi and parts of Jammu.

The Western Command has been assigned operational units:- II Corps, IX Corps, XI Corps and 40th Artillery Division. The command in total has following units under its belt:- 6 infantry divisions, 1 armoured division, 1 artillery division, 1 Reorganised Army Plains Infantry Division (RAPID), 3 armoured brigades, 1 mechanized brigade, 1 Air-defence brigade, and 1 engineering brigade.

Structure of Western Command
Insignia	Corps/Area	Corps/Area HQ	GOC of Corps/Area	Assigned Units	Unit HQ
	II Corps (Kharga Corps)	Ambala, Haryana	Lt Gen Manish Luthra	1 Armoured Division	Patiala, Punjab
	II Corps (Kharga Corps)	Ambala, Haryana	Lt Gen Manish Luthra	9 Infantry Division	Meerut, Uttar Pradesh
	II Corps (Kharga Corps)	Ambala, Haryana	Lt Gen Manish Luthra	22 Infantry Division	Meerut, Uttar Pradesh
	II Corps (Kharga Corps)	Ambala, Haryana	Lt Gen Manish Luthra	40 Artillery Division	Ambala, Haryana
	II Corps (Kharga Corps)	Ambala, Haryana	Lt Gen Manish Luthra	16 (Independent) Armoured Brigade	Mamun, Punjab
	II Corps (Kharga Corps)	Ambala, Haryana	Lt Gen Manish Luthra	612 Air-defence Brigade	N/A
	II Corps (Kharga Corps)	Ambala, Haryana	Lt Gen Manish Luthra	474 Engineering Brigade	N/A
	IX Corps (Rising Star Corps)	Yol, Himachal Pradesh	Lt Gen Akaash Johar	26 Infantry Division	Jammu, Jammu & Kashmir
	IX Corps (Rising Star Corps)	Yol, Himachal Pradesh	Lt Gen Akaash Johar	29 Infantry Division	Pathankot, Punjab
	IX Corps (Rising Star Corps)	Yol, Himachal Pradesh	Lt Gen Akaash Johar	2 (Independent) Armoured Brigade	Mamun, Punjab
	IX Corps (Rising Star Corps)	Yol, Himachal Pradesh	Lt Gen Akaash Johar	3 (Independent) Armoured Brigade	Ratnuchak, Jammu & Kashmir
	XI Corps (Vajra Corps)	Jalandhar, Punjab	Lt Gen Amit Kabthiyal	7 Infantry Division	Firozpur, Punjab
	XI Corps (Vajra Corps)	Jalandhar, Punjab	Lt Gen Amit Kabthiyal	15 Infantry Division	Amritsar, Punjab
	XI Corps (Vajra Corps)	Jalandhar, Punjab	Lt Gen Amit Kabthiyal	23 (Independent) Armoured Brigade	Khasa, Punjab
	XI Corps (Vajra Corps)	Jalandhar, Punjab	Lt Gen Amit Kabthiyal	55 (Independent) Mechanised Brigade	Beas, Punjab
	Delhi Area	Delhi, New Delhi	Lt Gen Rajesh Sethi	N/A	N/A

== Precursors (1855–1947) ==
Following is the list of precursors to the Western Command and their commanders:

=== Bombay Army (1855–1895) ===
Commander-in-Chief Bombay Army
S.No	Name	Assumed office	Left office	Unit of Commission	References
1	Lieutenant General Sir Henry Somerset KCB	March 1855	March 1860	N/A	
2	Lieutenant General Sir Hugh H. Rose GCB	March 1860	May 1860	19th Regiment of Foot	
3	Lieutenant General Sir William R. Mansfield KCB	May 1860	March 1865	53rd Regiment of Foot	
4	Lieutenant General Lord Napier of Magdala GCB, GCSI	November 1865	August 1869	Bengal Engineers	
5	Lieutenant General Sir Augustus A. Spencer KCB	August 1869	October 1874	43rd Light Infantry	
6	General Sir Charles W. D. Staveley KCB	October 1874	October 1878	Royal Irish Fusiliers	
7	General Sir Henry J. Warre KCB	October 1878	March 1881	54th Regiment of Foot	
8	General Arthur E. Hardinge KCB, CIE	March 1881	February 1886	41st Regiment of Foot	
9	Lieutenant General Charles G. Arbuthnot KCB	February 1886	December 1886	Royal Artillery	
10	Lieutenant General Duke of Connaught and Strathearn	December 1886	March 1890	Royal Engineers	
11	Lieutenant General Sir George R. Greaves KCB, KCMG	March 1890	April 1893	N/A	
12	Lieutenant General Sir John Hudson KCB	April 1893	June 1893	64th Regiment of Foot	
13	Lieutenant General Sir Charles E. Nairne KCB	September 1893	April 1895	Bengal Artillery	

=== Bombay Command (1895–1904) ===
General Officer Commanding-in-Chief Bombay Command
S.No	Name	Assumed office	Left office	Unit of Commission	References
1	Lieutenant General Sir Charles E. Nairne KCB	April 1895	October 1898	Bengal Artillery	
2	General Sir Robert C. Low GCB	October 1898	October 1903	Bengal Army	
3	Lieutenant General Sir Archibald Hunter KCB, DSO	October 1903	October 1904	4th (King's Own Royal) Regiment	

=== Western Command (1904–1908) ===
General Officer Commanding Western Command
S.No	Name	Assumed office	Left office	Unit of Commission	References
1	Lieutenant General Sir Archibald Hunter KCB, DSO	Oct 1904	Jun 1907	4th (King's Own Royal) Regiment	

=== Western Command (1920–1938) ===
General Officer Commanding Western Command
S.No	Name	Assumed office	Left office	Unit of Commission	References
1	Lieutenant General Sir Walter P. Braithwaite KCB	Dec 1920	Jun 1923	Somerset Light Infantry	
2	Lieutenant General Sir George M. Kirkpatrick KCB, KCSI	Jun 1923	Jun 1927	Royal Engineers	
3	Lieutenant General Sir Charles H. Harington GBE, KCB, DSO	Jun 1927	Jun 1931	King's Regiment (Liverpool)	
4	Lieutenant General Sir Torquil G. Matheson KCB, CMG	Jun 1931	Jun 1935	Bedfordshire and Hertfordshire Regiment	
5	Lieutenant General Sir Ivo L. B. Vesey KCB, KBE, CMG, DSO	Jun 1935	Mar 1936	Queen's Royal Regiment (West Surrey)	
6	Lieutenant General Sir Walter W. Pitt-Taylor KCB, CMG, DSO	Mar 1936	Nov 1938	Rifle Brigade (The Prince Consort's Own)	

=== Western Independent District (1938–1942) ===
General Officer Commanding Western Independent District
S.No	Name	Assumed office	Left office	Unit of Commission	References
1	Major General Thomas J. Hutton CB, MC*	Aug 1938	July 1940	Royal Artillery	
2	Major General John F. Evetts CB, CBE, MC	July 1940	Feb 1941	Cameronians (Scottish Rifles)	
3	Lieutenant General Edward F. Norton DSO, MC	Feb 1941	Apr 1942	Royal Artillery	

=== North-Western Army (1942–1945) ===
General Officer Commanding-in-Chief North-Western Army
S.No	Name	Assumed office	Left office	Unit of Commission	References
1	General Sir Cyril D. Noyes CB, CBE, MC*	Apr 1942	May 1943	Royal Scots Fusiliers	
1	General Sir Edward P. Quinan KCIE, CB, DSO, OBE	May 1943	Aug 1943	Worcestershire Regiment	
3	General Sir Henry Finnis KCB, CB, MC	Aug 1943	May 1945	Indian Staff Corps	
Acting	Major-General Cecil Toovey CB, CBE, MC*	Jun 1945	Oct 1945	Indian Staff Corps	
4	General Sir Richard N. O'Connor KCB, DSO*, MC	Oct 1945	Nov 1945	Cameronians (Scottish Rifles)	

=== Delhi and East Punjab Command (1947–1948) ===
General Officer Commanding-in-Chief Delhi and East Punjab Command
S.No	Name	Assumed office	Left office	Unit of Commission	References
1	Lieutenant General Dudley Russell CBE, CB, DSO, MC	15 August 1947	19 January 1948	97th Deccan Infantry	

== List of GOC-in-C of Western Command (1948–present) ==
General Officer Commanding-in-Chief Western Command
S.No	Name	Assumed office	Left office	Unit of Commission	References
1	Lieutenant General Kodandera Madappa Cariappa OBE	20 Jan 1948	14 Jan 1949	Rajput Regiment	
2	Lieutenant General Satyawant Mallana Shrinagesh	15 Jan 1949	14 Jan 1953	19th Hyderabad Regiment	
3	Lieutenant General Kodandera Subayya Thimayya DSO	15 Jan 1953	31 Aug 1953	19th Hyderabad Regiment	
4	Lieutenant General Kalwant Singh	01 Sep 1953	24 Mar 1954	1st Punjab Regiment	
5	Lieutenant General Kodandera Subayya Thimayya DSO	25 Mar 1954	14 May 1955	19th Hyderabad Regiment	
6	Lieutenant General Kalwant Singh	15 May 1955	14 May 1959	1st Punjab Regiment	
7	Lieutenant General Pran Nath Thapar PVSM	25 May 1959	7 May 1961	1st Punjab Regiment	
8	Lieutenant General Daulet Singh	8 May 1961	22 Nov 1963	Armoured Corps	
9	Lieutenant General Sam Manekshaw MC	04 Dec 1963	15 Nov 1964	12th Frontier Force Regiment	
10	Lieutenant General Harbaksh Singh VrC	16 Nov 1964	26 Sep 1969	5 Sikh Regiment	
11	Lieutenant General Kunhiraman Palat Candeth PVSM	27 Sep 1969	21 Oct 1972	Royal Indian Artillery	
12	Lieutenant General M. L. Thapan PVSM	23 Oct 1972	26 Oct 1973	Jat Regiment	
13	Lieutenant General Tapishwar Narain Raina MVC	27 Oct 1973	31 May 1975	Kumaon Regiment	
14	Lieutenant General Inderjit Singh Gill PVSM, MC	10 Jun 1975	30 May 1979	Royal Engineers	
15	Lieutenant General Kotikalapudi Venkata Krishna Rao PVSM	31 May 1979	31 May 1981	Mahar Regiment	
16	Lieutenant General Srinivas Kumar Sinha PVSM	01 Jun 1981	31 Dec 1982	5th Gorkha Rifles (Frontier Force)	
17	Lieutenant General Krishnaswamy Sundarji PVSM	01 Jun 1983	13 Feb 1985	Mahar Regiment	
18	Lieutenant General Hriday Kaul PVSM, AVSM	14 Feb 1985	30 Sep 1986	2nd Lancers	
19	Lieutenant General P. N. Hoon PVSM, AVSM, SM	01 Oct 1986	31 Oct 1987	Dogra Regiment	
20	Lieutenant General V. K. Nayar PVSM, SM	01 Nov 1987	31 Oct 1989	Parachute Regiment	
21	Lieutenant General Sunith Francis Rodrigues PVSM, VSM	1 November 1989	30 June 1990	Regiment of Artillery	
22	Lieutenant General G. S. Grewal PVSM	01 Jul 1990	31 Jul 1992	1st Horse	
23	Lieutenant General Bipin Chandra Joshi PVSM, AVSM	14 Aug 1992	30 Jun 1993	64th Cavalry	
24	Lieutenant General R. K. Gulati PVSM	01 Jul 1993	15 Apr 1995	9th Deccan Horse	
25	Lieutenant General Arun Kumar Gautama PVSM	16 Apr 1995	31 Oct 1996	16th Light Cavalry	
26	Lieutenant General H. B. Kala PVSM, AVSM, SC	01 Nov 1996	14 Oct 1999	Jat Regiment	
27	Lieutenant General Vijay Oberoi PVSM, AVSM, VSM	15 Oct 1999	29 Sep 2000	Maratha Light Infantry	
28	Lieutenant General Surjit Singh Sangra PVSM, VSM	1 Oct 2000	31 Mar 2002	Dogra Regiment	
29	Lieutenant General Shamsher Singh Mehta PVSM, AVSM, VSM	5 Apr 2002	31 Jan 2004	63rd Cavalry	
30	Lieutenant General Joginder Jaswant Singh PVSM, AVSM, VSM	1 Feb 2004	31 Jan 2005	Maratha Light Infantry	
31	Lieutenant General S. Pattabhiraman,PVSM, AVSM, SM, VSM	1 Feb 2005	30 Sep 2005	Bombay Sappers	
32	Lieutenant General Daljeet Singh PVSM, AVSM, VSM	1 Oct 2005	31 Oct 2007	8th Light Cavalary	
33	Lieutenant General T. K. Sapru PVSM, YSM	1 Nov 2007	30 Nov 2009	1st Gorkha Rifles	
34	Lieutenant General S. R. Ghosh PVSM, AVSM, SM	3 Dec 2009	31 May 2012	Brigade of The Guards	
35	Lieutenant General Sanjiv Chachra AVSM, VSM	1 Jun 2012	30 Jun 2013	Rajput Regiment	
36	Lieutenant General Philip Campose AVSM, VSM	1 Jul 2013	31 Jul 2014	Mechanised Infantry Regiment	
37	Lieutenant General Kamaljit Singh PVSM, AVSM	1 Aug 2014	31 Jul 2016	63rd Cavalry	
38	Lieutenant General Surinder Singh PVSM, AVSM, VSM	17 Sep 2016	31 Jul 2019	Brigade of the Guards	
39	Lieutenant General Ravendra Pal Singh PVSM, AVSM, VSM	1 Aug 2019	31 Oct 2021	Mechanised Infantry Regiment	
40	Lieutenant General Nav Kumar Khanduri PVSM, AVSM, VSM	1 Nov 2021	30 June 2023	Army Air Defence Corps	
41	Lieutenant General Manoj Kumar Katiyar PVSM, UYSM, AVSM	1 July 2023	31 March 2026	Rajput Regiment	
42	Lieutenant General Pushpendra Pal Singh AVSM, SM**	1 April 2026	Incumbent	Parachute Regiment	
