= Vikas Rohella =

Lieutenant General in the Indian Army

Lieutenant General Vikas Rohella AVSM, SM**
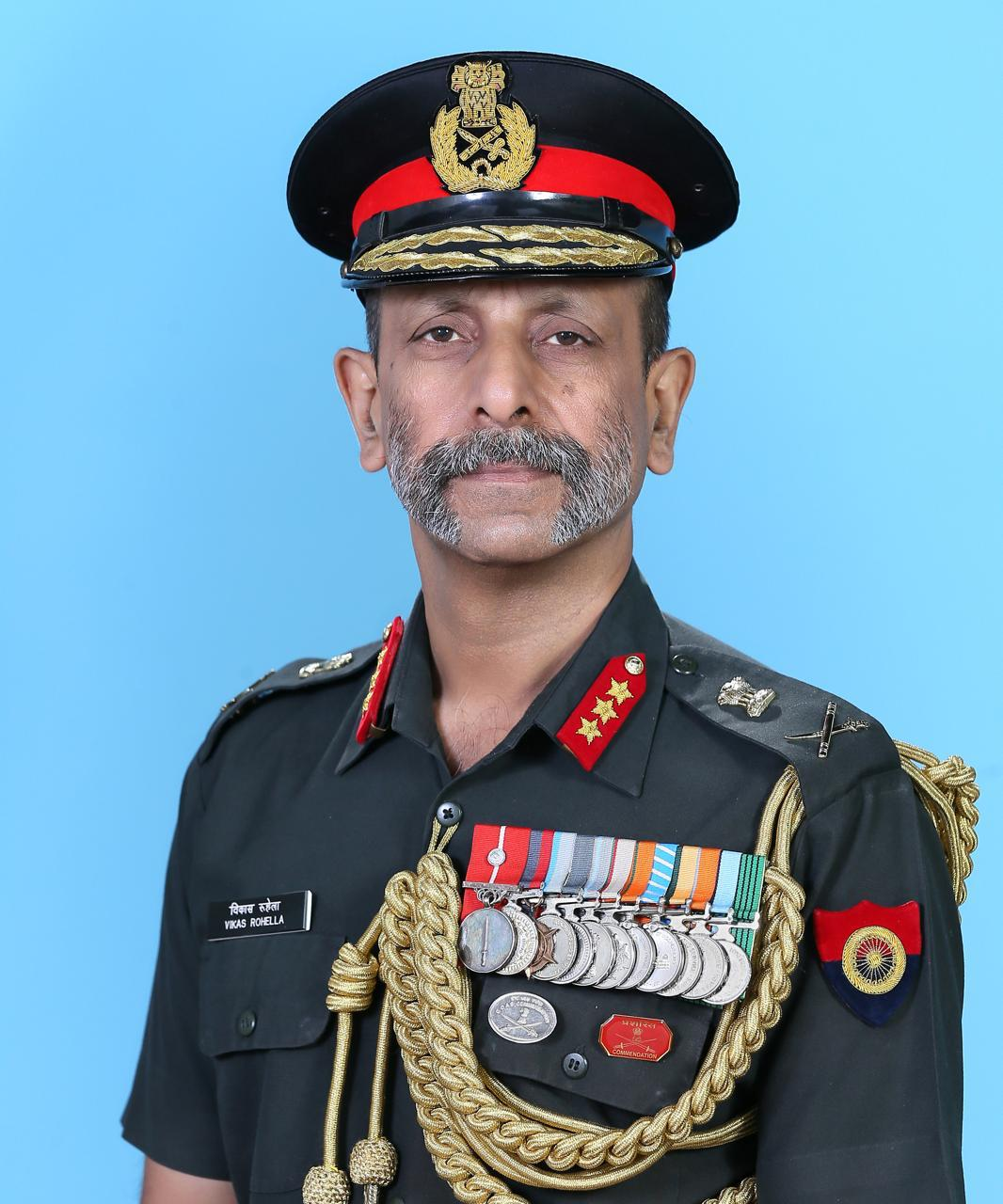
- Lieutenant General Vikas Rohella
- Military career
- Allegiance: India
- Branch: Indian Army
- Rank: Lieutenant General
- Unit: Corps of Engineers
- Awards: AVSM, Bar to Sena Medal

Vikas Rohella is a senior officer of the Indian Army who currently serves as the Engineer-in-Chief (E-in-C) of the Army, heading the Corps of Engineers and advising the Service and the Ministry of Defence on engineering and infrastructure matters.

== Military career ==
Rohella was commissioned into the Corps of Engineers and has held a range of staff and command appointments related to infrastructure, land management and environmental planning for the Service.

As DGLWE he oversaw Army-wide policies on land, works and environmental management and represented the Corps in national-level forums. During this tenure he also served as Colonel Commandant of the Bombay Engineer Group.

On 4 October 2025 he formally assumed charge as Engineer-in-Chief of the Indian Army.

== Awards and decorations ==
The general officer has been awarded the Sena Medal twice.

Ati Vishisht Seva Medal		Sena Medal	
Samanya Seva Medal	Operation Vijay Star	Siachen Glacier Medal	Operation Vijay Medal
Operation Parakram Medal	Sainya Seva Medal	High Altitude Medal	75th Independence Anniversary Medal
50th Independence Anniversary Medal	30 Years Long Service Medal	20 Years Long Service Medal	9 Years Long Service Medal
