= Anindya Sengupta =

Retired Lieutenant General of the Indian Army

Lieutenant General Anindya Sengupta PVSM UYSM AVSM YSM
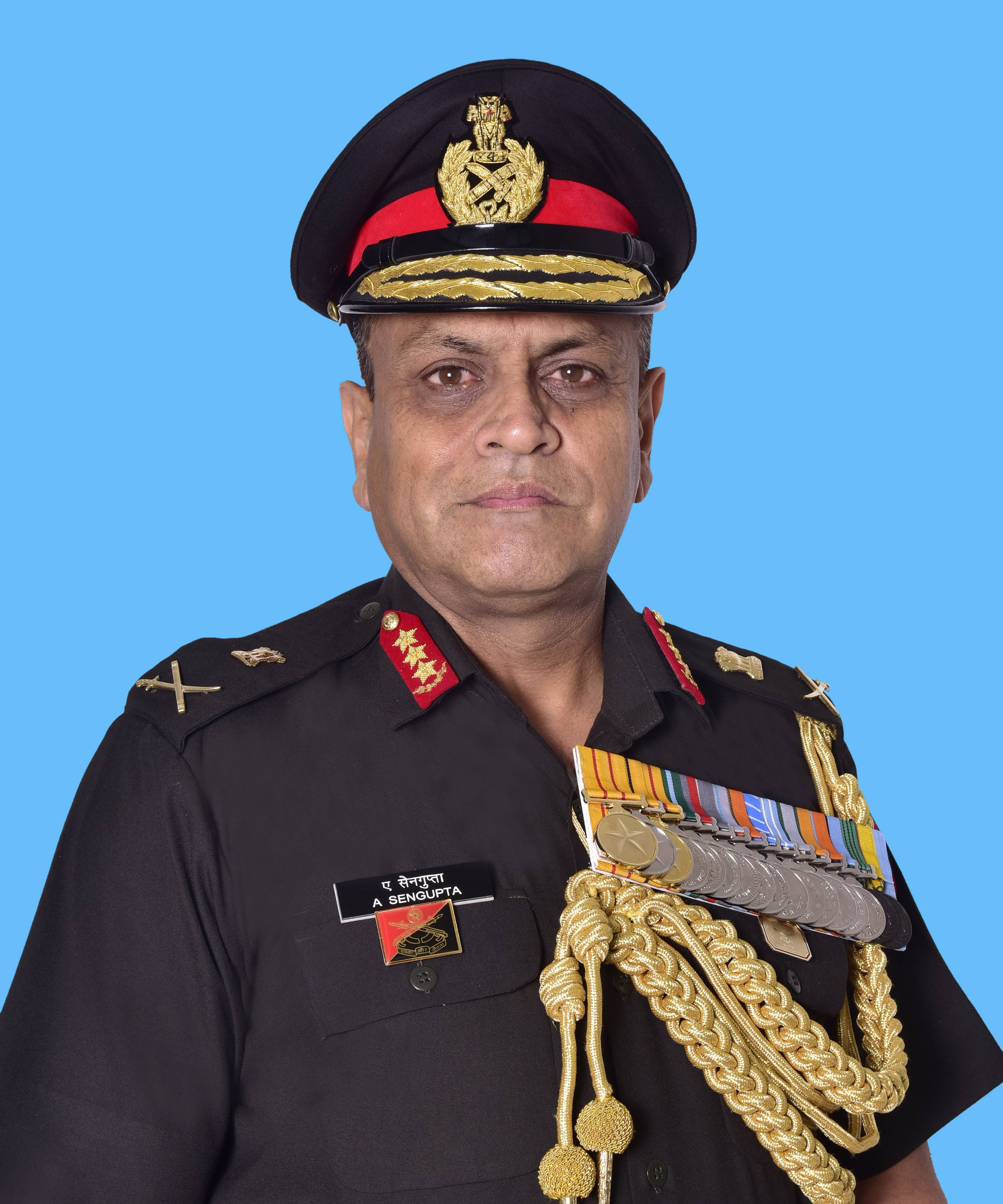

General Officer Commanding-in-Chief Central Command
- In office 1 July 2024 – 30 September 2026
- Chief of Army Staff: Upendra Dwivedi; Dhiraj Seth
- Preceded by: N. S. Raja Subramani
- Succeeded by: Sanjay Mitra

Military service
- Allegiance: India
- Branch/service: Indian Army
- Years of service: 13 June 1987 – 30 September 2026
- Rank: Lieutenant General
- Unit: 14 Punjab Regiment
- Commands: Central Command; XIV Corps; Victor Force
- Service Number: IC-44545X
- Awards: Param Vishisht Seva Medal; Uttam Yudh Seva Medal; Ati Vishisht Seva Medal; Yudh Seva Medal

Lieutenant General Anindya Sengupta PVSM, UYSM, AVSM, YSM is a former general officer of the Indian Army. He last served as the General Officer Commanding-in-Chief Central Command. He previously served as the Chief of Staff, Northern Command. He earlier served as General Officer Commanding of the Leh-based Fire and Fury Corps (XIV).

== Early life and education ==
The general Officer is an alumnus of National Defence Academy, Khadakwasla and the Indian Military Academy, Dehradun. He is also an alumnus of Defence Services Staff College, Wellington, Army War College, Mhow and the National Defence College.

== Military career ==
He was commissioned into the 14th battalion of the Punjab Regiment on 13 June 1987 from the Indian Military Academy. He has tenanted various Command and Staff appointments with a wide spectrum of operational, field and highly active Counter Insurgency profile. He has served on the line of actual control at Arunachal Pradesh, Manipur and Nagaland, on the line of control in Kashmir Valley, Siachen Glacier and line of actual control in Eastern Ladakh.

He has been an instructor at National Defence Academy, directing staff at Defence Services Staff College, Wellington, military observer in Congo, Brigade Major of an Infantry Brigade, director force structuring at Strategic Planning Directorate, Brigadier Staff duties at staff duties directorate, Additional Director General Complaint Advisory Board in Chief of Army Staff secretariat.

As Colonel, he acted as Chief of Staff for the CPX portion of Exercise Yudh Abhyas 2013, a joint force exercise between the U.S. and Indian Armed forces, promoting cooperation and coercion in a simulation UN peacekeeping mission. He had commanded an infantry regiment in plains, an infantry brigade on the Line of Control, an infantry brigade in the Democratic Republic of Congo as part of UN Mission (MONUSCO) and Counter Insurgency Force (Victor Force) in Kashmir. He also served as the Director General of Strategic Planning at the IHQ of MoD (Army) in New Delhi.

On 5 January 2022, he took over as the General Officer Commanding Fire and Fury Corps from Lieutenant General PGK Menon. The general officer was awarded Uttam Yudh Seva Medal in 2023 for his distinguished service while commanding the XIV Corps in the Northern Theatre. A year later, in March 2023, he was appointed as the Chief of Staff of Northern Command.

On 1 July 2024, he took over as the General Officer Commanding-in-Chief Central Command succeeding Lieutenant General N. S. Raja Subramani upon his elevation as the Vice Chief of Army Staff. He supperannuated on 30 September 2026 after four decades of sevice.

== Awards and decorations ==
The General officer has been awarded with the Param Vishisht Seva Medal in 2025, the Uttam Yudh Seva Medal in 2023, the Ati Vishisht Seva Medal and the Yudh Seva Medal. He is also a recipient of Chief of Integrated Defence Staff to the Chairman Chiefs of Staff Committee Commendation Card and Mention-in-Dispatches.

Param Vishisht Seva Medal		Uttam Yudh Seva Medal	
Ati Vishisht Seva Medal	Yudh Seva Medal	Samanya Seva Medal	Special Service Medal
Siachen Glacier Medal	Operation Vijay Medal	Sainya Seva Medal	High Altitude Medal
Videsh Seva Medal	75th Independence Anniversary Medal	50th Independence Anniversary Medal	30 Years Long Service Medal
20 Years Long Service Medal	9 Years Long Service Medal	UNAVEM	MONUSCO

== Dates of Rank ==
Insignia	Rank	Component	Date of rank
	Second Lieutenant	Indian Army	13 June 1987
	Lieutenant	Indian Army	13 June 1989
	Captain	Indian Army	13 June 1992
	Major	Indian Army	13 June 1998
	Lieutenant Colonel	Indian Army	16 December 2004
	Colonel	Indian Army	1 January 2008
	Brigadier	Indian Army	5 July 2013 (acting) 1 June 2014 (substantive, with seniority from 13 January 2012)
	Major General	Indian Army	3 May 2019 (seniority from 1 January 2018)
	Lieutenant General	Indian Army	27 September 2021

Military offices
Preceded by N. S. Raja Subramani	General Officer Commanding-in-Chief Central Command; 1 July 2024 - 30 September 2026	Succeeded by Sanjay Mitra
Preceded by N. S. Raja Subramani	Chief of Staff, Northern Command; 14 March 2023 - 30 June 2024	Succeeded by Vijay B Nair
Preceded by PGK Menon	General Officer Commanding XIV Corps; 5 January 2022 - 12 March 2023	Succeeded by Rashim Bali
