= Military Secretary (India) =

Appointment in the Indian Army

Military Secretary is a senior position in the Army Headquarters of the Indian Army, the post is a headed by a senior officer of the Lieutenant General rank. Military Secretary controls appointments of officers above the rank of Lieutenant except the Medical Corps.

Military Secretary is also responsible for promotions, postings, tenures and for the grant of honorary ranks in Indian Army. The Military Secretary is one of seven Principal Staff Officers of the Indian Army.

== Military Secretaries ==
- Lt Gen Avadhesh Prakash
- Lt Gen G. M. Nair, PVSM, AVSM, SM, VSM.
- Lt Gen C. R. Sampath Kumar, PVSM, AVSM, VSM, Colonel of the Regiment - Artillery
- Lt Gen Syed Ata Hasnain, PVSM, UYSM, AVSM, SM, VSM & BAR
- Lt Gen Shakti Gurung, PVSM, UYSM, AVSM, VSM, Colonel of the Regiment - Grenadiers.
- Lt Gen Rajiv Bhalla, PVSM, AVSM, SM, VSM
- Lt Gen G. S. Gill
- Lt Gen JS Sandhu, PVSM, UYSM, AVSM, VSM - 5 Gorkha Rifles (FF)
- Lt Gen Anil Kumar Bhatt
- LT Gen Rajeev Sirohi, AVSM, VSM
- Lt Gen P Gopalakrishna Menon, UYSM, AVSM
