= Central Command (India) =

Indian Army regional command

- Insignia of the Central Command
- Active: 1942–1946; 1 May 1963 – Present
- Country: India
- Branch: Indian Army
- Type: Command
- Garrison/HQ: Lucknow, Uttar Pradesh
- Nickname: Surya Command

Commanders
- Current commander: Lt Gen Sanjay Mitra, AVSM
- Notable commanders: Gen S F Rodrigues; Gen N. S. Raja Subramani

Insignia
- Flag

The Central Command is of the seven operational commands of the Indian Army which was established on 1 May 1963. It is also known as the 'Surya Command' and headquarterd at Lucknow, Uttar Pradesh.

The current Central Army Commander is Lieutenant General Sanjay Mitra, who assumed command on 1 October 2026.

== History ==
=== Second World War ===
Central Command was first established in 1942 during World War II and then disbanded in 1946. Southern Command was responsible for most of the training activities for Indian Army until Central Command was formed in April 1942 which took over the responsibility of some of the training areas.

=== Post 1962 Indo-China war ===
With its HQ at Lucknow the Command was re-established on 1 May 1963 due to the Sino-Indian War of 1962. Lt Gen K Bahadur Singh was the first Army Commander of the new Central Command. Prior to that date Lucknow had been the headquarters of the Eastern Command.

=== Humanitarian assistance and flood relief operations ===
Central Command undertook humanitarian and Flood Relief Operations at various locations during flash floods including Delhi and Kinnaur (Himachal Pradesh).

== Structure ==
Central Command's Area Of Responsibility (AOR) covers eight states of India: Uttar Pradesh, Uttarakhand, Himachal Pradesh, Madhya Pradesh, Chhattisgarh, Bihar, Jharkhand and Odisha. 18 Regimental Centres and a large number of logistic and training establishments come under Central Command. The responsibility for the central sector of the Western border with Pakistan also lies with Central Command. Almost half of the 62 cantonments in India lie within the Central Command's theatre.

In February 2024, reports emerged for the formation of a new Corps under the Central Command for deployment along Line of Actual Control (LAC). The XVIII Corps will consist of at least one division (with around 15,000 to 18,000 combat soldiers each) and three independent brigades. This includes 14 RAPID Division, 9 Mountain Brigade, 136 Mountain Brigade and 119 Mountain Brigade. This move will convert HQ Uttar Bharat from a Static Formation into 'Full-fledged Combat Arm'.

There are two Static Area Formations:– Uttar Bharat Area and Madhya Bharat Area. Central Command earlier used to act as a strategic reserve but now it is looking after Uttarakhand sector of Indo-Tibet and Indo-Nepal border.

Structure of Central Command
Insignia	Corps/Area	Corps/Area HQ	General Officer Commanding	Assigned Units	Unit HQ
	Uttar Bharat Area	Bareilly, Uttar Pradesh	Lt Gen Divya Gaurav Misra		
	Madhya Bharat Area	Jabalpur, Madhya Pradesh	Lt Gen Harbinder Singh Vandra		
				14 RAPID Division	Dehradun, Uttarakhand
				50 (Independent) Parachute Brigade	Agra, Uttar Pradesh
				9 (Independent) Mountain Brigade	Joshimath, Uttarakhand
				136 (Independent) Mountain Brigade	Poo, Himachal Pradesh
				119 (Independent) Mountain Brigade	Pithoragarh, Uttarakhand

== Precursors ==
Following is the list of precursors to the Western Command and their commanders:

=== Central Command (1942–1946) ===
General Officer Commanding-in-Chief Central Command
S.No	Rank	Name	Portrait	Assumed office	Left office	Unit of Commission	References
1	Lieutenant General	Henry B. D. Willcox		May 1942	December 1944	Sherwood Foresters	
2	General	Sir Geoffry A. P. Scoones		December 1944	December 1946	2nd King Edward VII's Own Gurkha Rifles (The Sirmoor Rifles)	

== List of GOC-in-C of Central Command (1963–present) ==
S.No	Rank	Name	Portrait	Assumed office	Left office	Unit of Commission	References
1	Lieutenant General	Kanwar Bahadur Singh		May 1963	August 1966	19th Hyderabad Regiment	
2	Lieutenant General	Joginder Singh Dhillon		August 1966	August 1970	Corps of Engineers	
3	Lieutenant General	Premindra Singh Bhagat		August 1970	Jun 1972	Corps of Engineers	
4	Lieutenant General	Har Krishen Sibal		June 1972	November 1973	5th Gorkha Rifles (Frontier Force)	
5	Lieutenant General	Khem Karan Singh		November 1973	March 1975	16 Light Cavalry	
6	Lieutenant General	J. S. Nakai		April 1975	March 1979	Regiment of Artillery	
7	Lieutenant General	Ram Dharam Dass Hira		April 1979	June 1980	11th Gorkha Rifles	
8	Lieutenant General	Walter Anthony Gustavo Pinto		July 1980	June 1982	Brigade of the Guards	
9	Lieutenant General	H. C. Dutta		July 1982	November 1983	8th Gorkha Rifles	
10	Lieutenant General	Bhupinder Singh		December 1983	September 1985	Regiment of Artillery	
11	Lieutenant General	K. K. Hazari		October 1985	January 1986	Regiment of Artillery	
12	Lieutenant General	K. B. Mehta		February 1986	December 1987	Brigade of the Guards	
13	Lieutenant General	Sami Khan		January 1988	March 1989	Madras Regiment	
14	Lieutenant General	Sunith Francis Rodrigues		April 1989	October 1989	Regiment of Artillery	
15	Lieutenant General	Faridoon Noshir Billimoria		November 1989	June 1991	5th Gorkha Rifles (Frontier Force)	
16	Lieutenant General	Vijai Singh		July 1991	February 1992	8th Light Cavalry	
17	Lieutenant General	Y. N. Sharma		March 1992	March 1994	The Grenadiers	
18	Lieutenant General	Arun Kumar Gautama		April 1994	April 1995	16th Light Cavalry	
19	Lieutenant General	R. K. Gulati		April 1995	May 1996	9th Deccan Horse	
20	Lieutenant General	Chandra Sekhar		June 1996	September 1997	4th Gorkha Rifles	
21	Lieutenant General	Surjit Singh		October 1997	September 2000	Dogra Regiment	
22	Lieutenant General	Pankaj Shivram Joshi		October 2000	September 2001	8th Gorkha Rifles	
23	Lieutenant General	D. S. Chauhan		October 2001	December 2003	Madras Regiment	
24	Lieutenant General	Ram Subramanyam		January 2004	December 2005	Corps of Engineers	
25	Lieutenant General	Om Prakash Nandrajog		January 2006	February 2008	Brigade of the Guards	
26	Lieutenant General	Harcharanjit Singh Panag		March 2008	December 2008	Sikh Regiment	
27	Lieutenant General	Jayanta Kumar Mohanty		January 2009	February 2010	Dogra Regiment	
28	Lieutenant General	Vijay Kumar Ahluwalia		March 2010	February 2012	Regiment of Artillery	
29	Lieutenant General	Anil Chait		March 2012	June 2013	Armoured Corps	
30	Lieutenant General	Rajan Bakhshi		July 2013	November 2015	17th Horse (Poona Horse)	
31	Lieutenant General	Balwant Singh Negi		December 2015	30 September 2018	Assam Regiment	
32	Lieutenant General	Abhay Krishna		1 October 2018	30 September 2019	Rajputana Rifles	
33	Lieutenant General	Iqroop Singh Ghuman		1 October 2019	31 March 2021	Brigade of The Guards	
34	Lieutenant General	Yogendra Dimri		1 April 2021	28 February 2023	Corps of Engineers	
35	Lieutenant General	N. S. Raja Subramani		1 March 2023	30 June 2024	Garhwal Rifles	
36	Lieutenant General	Anindya Sengupta		1 July 2024	30 September 2026	Punjab Regiment	
37	Lieutenant General	Sanjay Mitra		1 October 2026	Incumbent	The Grenadiers	

== Notes ==
1.Later promoted to the rank of General.

== See also ==
- Operation Surya Hope
