= Sanjay Mitra (general) =

Lieutenant General in the Indian Army

Lieutenant General Sanjay Mitra AVSM
- Official portrait, 2026

General Officer Commanding-in-Chief Central Command
- Incumbent
- Assumed office 1 October 2026
- Chief of Army Staff: Dhiraj Seth
- Preceded by: Anindya Sengupta

Military service
- Allegiance: India
- Branch/service: Indian Army
- Years of service: 10 June 1989 – Present
- Rank: Lieutenant General
- Unit: Grenadiers
- Commands: Central Command; I Corps; 39 Mountain Division
- Service number: IC-48520H
- Awards: Ati Vishisht Seva Medal

Lieutenant General Sanjay Mitra, AVSM is a serving general officer of the Indian Army. He is currently serving as the General Officer Commanding-in-Chief, Central Command. He previously served Director General of Operational Logistics & Strategic Movement, prior to that he was General Officer Commanding I Corps. He is also the Colonel of the Regiment of The Grenadiers since 1 July 2024.

Lt Gen Sanjay Mitra taking over as Central Army Commander

== Early life and education ==
He is an alumnus of the National Defence Academy and the Indian Military Academy. He is also an alumnus of Defence Services Staff College, Wellington and National Defence College, New Delhi.

== Military career ==
Mitra was commissioned into the Grenadiers on 10 June 1989 from the Indian Military Academy. In a career spanning over three decades, he has held numerous command and staff appointments. He has commanded an Infantry Battalion, an Infantry Brigade and an Infantry Division along the Line of Control in Northern Jammu and Kashmir and the Line of Actual Control in Eastern Ladakh. His instructional appointment include a tenure as instructor at Commando School Belgaum and Chief Instructor (Army) at Defence Services Staff College, Wellington. He also served as a Squadron Commander in National Security Guard and a Colonel General Staff in Faculty of Studies, Army War College.

After getting promoted to the rank of Lieutenant General, on 9 June 2023 he took over as the General Officer Commanding I Corps succeeding Lieutenant General Gajendra Joshi and relinquished the command on 17 June 2025. He then moved to the Army headquarters as Director General of Operational Logistics & Strategic Movement taking over from Lieutenant General Pushpendra Singh upon his elevation as the Vice Chief of Army Staff.

On 1 October 2026, Lieutenant General Mitra took over as the General Officer Commanding-in-Chief, Central Command succeeding Lieutenant General Anindya Sengupta when the latter superannuated on 30 September 2026.

== Awards and decorations ==
The general officer has been awarded with the Ati Vishisht Seva Medal in 2023 and received the Chief of Army Staff Commendation and Army Commander Commendation.

Ati Vishisht Seva Medal		Samanya Seva Medal	
Special Service Medal	Operation Vijay Star	Siachen Glacier Medal	Operation Vijay Medal
Operation Parakram Medal	Sainya Seva Medal	High Altitude Medal	75th Independence Anniversary Medal
50th Independence Anniversary Medal	30 Years Long Service Medal	20 Years Long Service Medal	9 Years Long Service Medal

== Dates of rank ==
Insignia	Rank	Component	Date of rank
	Second Lieutenant	Indian Army	10 June 1989
	Lieutenant	Indian Army	10 June 1991
	Captain	Indian Army	10 June 1994
	Major	Indian Army	10 June 2000
	Lieutenant Colonel	Indian Army	16 December 2004
	Colonel	Indian Army	1 May 2009
	Brigadier	Indian Army	1 April 2015 (acting) 22 November 2016 (substantive with seniority from 8 July 2014)
	Major General	Indian Army	4 December 2020 (seniority from 19 July 2019)
	Lieutenant General	Indian Army	9 June 2023

Military offices
Preceded by Anindya Sengupta	General Officer Commanding-in-Chief; Central Command; 1 October 2026 - Present	Succeeded by Incumbent
Preceded by Pushpendra Pal Singh	Director General; Operational Logistics & Strategic Movement; August 2025 - September 2026	Succeeded by
Preceded by Gajendra Joshi	General Officer Commanding; I Corps; 9 June 2023 – 17 June 2025	Succeeded by V. Hariharan
