= General (India) =

Rank in the Indian Army

- Flag of a general

- Rank insignia of a general

- Vehicle Star Plate of The General
- Country: India
- Service branch: Indian Army
- Abbreviation: Gen
- Rank: Four-star rank
- Next higher rank: Field marshal
- Next lower rank: Lieutenant general
- Equivalent ranks: Admiral (Indian Navy); Air chief marshal (Indian Air Force)

General is a four-star general officer rank in the Indian Army. It is the highest active rank in the Indian Army. General ranks above the three-star rank of lieutenant general and below the five-star rank of field marshal, which is largely a war-time or ceremonial rank.

A general may be referred to as a full general or four-star general to distinguish them from lower general officer ranks like lieutenant general and major general. The equivalent rank in the Indian Navy is admiral and in the Indian Air Force is air chief marshal.

As of 2026, there are two serving full generals in the Indian Armed Forces, General N. S. Raja Subramani, the Chief of Defence Staff and Chairman, Chiefs of Staff Committee, and General Dhiraj Seth, the Chief of the Army Staff.

== History ==
The first Indian to hold the rank of full general was K. M. Cariappa. He was promoted to the acting rank of General when he took over as the Commander-in-Chief of the Indian Army on 15 January 1949. All the chiefs of the Indian Army after him, have been full generals.

Since 1950, it has been a tradition for the President of India to award the chief of the Nepalese Army with the honorary rank of General of the Indian Army.

The rank is held by the Chief of the Army Staff (COAS), the professional head of the Indian Army, and may also be held by the Chief of Defence Staff (CDS). Until 1 January 2020, when the post of Chief of the Defence Staff (CDS) was established, the COAS was the only officer to hold the rank of full general. Upon the creation of the post and the appointment of General Bipin Rawat as the first CDS, there were two serving full generals for the first time in Independent India.

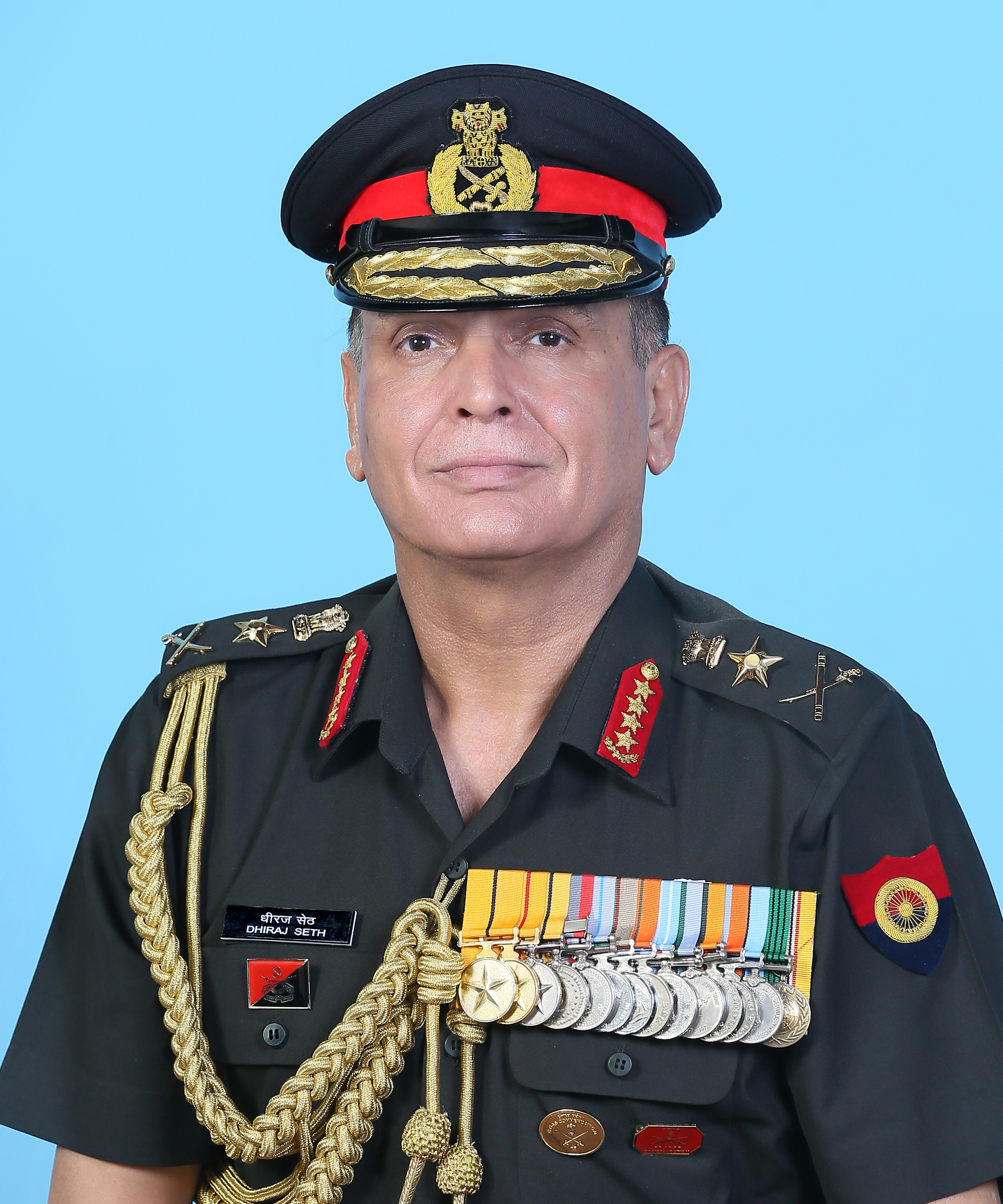
General Dhiraj Seth in uniform

== Insignia ==
The rank insignia of a general are:

- CDS - Gold-wreathed tri-service emblem of the Indian Armed Forces (the Naval anchor, crossed Army swords and Air Force eagle, all surmounted by the Ashoka emblem).
- COAS - Crossed sword and baton with a five-pointed star and Ashoka emblem above.

The gorget patches of a general are:

- CDS - maroon patches with four golden stars and golden laurel wreath
- COAS - crimson patches with four golden stars and golden laurel wreath

== Appointment and term length ==
Appointments to the office of CDS and COAS are made by the Appointments Committee of the Cabinet (ACC), which is chaired by the Prime Minister of India. The Chief of Defence Staff serves from the date of appointment until reaching the maximum age of 65. The Chief of the Army Staff reaches superannuation upon three years in the office or at the age of 62, whichever is earlier.

== Order of precedence ==
A general ranks at No. 12 on the Indian order of precedence, along with the CDS and the Chiefs of Staff of the Indian Navy and Indian Air Force (the CNS and the CAS). A general is at pay level 18, equivalent to Cabinet Secretary of India (at No. 11 on the warrant of precedence), with a monthly pay of ₹250,000 (US$3,500).

Equivalent ranks of Indian military
Commission	Indian Navy	Indian Army	Indian Air Force
Commissioned	Admiral of the fleet	Field marshal	Marshal of the Indian Air Force
Commissioned	Admiral	General	Air chief marshal
Commissioned	Vice admiral	Lieutenant general	Air marshal
Commissioned	Rear admiral	Major general	Air vice marshal
Commissioned	Commodore	Brigadier	Air commodore
Commissioned	Captain	Colonel	Group captain
Commissioned	Commander	Lieutenant colonel	Wing commander
Commissioned	Lieutenant commander	Major	Squadron leader
Commissioned	Lieutenant	Captain	Flight lieutenant
Commissioned	Sub lieutenant	Lieutenant	Flying officer
Junior commissioned	Master chief petty officer 1st class	Subedar major (Note: Risaldar major in cavalry and armoured regiments)	Master warrant officer
Junior commissioned	Master chief petty officer 2nd class	Subedar (Note: Risaldar in cavalry and armoured regiments)	Warrant officer
Junior commissioned	Chief petty officer	Naib subedar (Note: Naib risaldar in cavalry and armoured regiments. Called jemadar until 1965.)	Junior warrant officer
Non-commissioned	Petty officer	Havildar/Daffadar	Sergeant
Non-commissioned	Leading seaman	Naik/Lance daffadar	Corporal
Non-commissioned	Seaman 1	Lance naik/Acting Lance-Daffadar	Leading aircraftsman
Non-commissioned	Seaman 2	Sepoy/Sowar	Aircraftsman

== See also ==
- Chief of Defence Staff
- Chief of the Army Staff
- List of serving generals of the Indian Army
- Army ranks and insignia of India
