= Bansi Ponnappa =

Indian Army officer

Lieutenant General Channira Bansi Ponnappa PVSM AVSM VSM
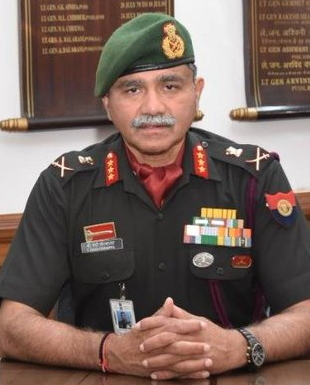
- Military career
- Allegiance: India; United Nations
- Branch: Indian Army
- Service years: 8 June 1985 – 31 July 2024
- Rank: Lieutenant General
- Unit: 2 Mahar Regiment
- Commands: XI Corps; 28 Infantry Division; 104 Infantry Brigade; 2 Mahar Regiment
- Conflicts: M23 rebellion
- Awards: Param Vishisht Seva Medal; Ati Vishisht Seva Medal; Vishisht Seva Medal

Lieutenant General Channira Bansi Ponnappa, PVSM, AVSM, VSM is a retired general officer of the Indian Army. He last served as the Adjutant General of the Indian Army. He previously served as the General Officer Commanding of the XI Corps. The general officer is also the Colonel of the Mahar Regiment. As a UN peacekeeper, he is known for his role as commander of the United Nations' MONUSCO forces in the North Kivu region of the Democratic Republic of the Congo during the M23 rebellion.

== Early life and education ==
Gen Ponnappa hails from the Nangala village near Bittangala in the Kodagu district in Karnataka. He attended the St Joseph's Boys' High School, Bangalore, a part of the batch of 1980. He then attended the St Joseph's College, Bangalore for a year before joining the National Defence Academy in 1981. He graduated from the Indian Military Academy in 1985. He is also an alumnus of Defence Services Staff College, Wellington, College of Defence Management, Secunderabad, and National Defence College, Delhi.

== Military career ==
He was commissioned into the 2nd battalion of the Mahar Regiment in June 1985 from the Indian Military Academy. He commanded a company, combating the counter insurgency in Manipur. He attended the Defence Services Staff College, Wellington. He subsequently served as the Brigade Major of an Independent Armoured Brigade. As a colonel, he later commanded his battalion in amphibious operations. He then served as the Colonel General Staff Operations (Col GS (Ops)) of an Infantry Division.

Promoted to the rank of Brigadier, he commanded the Shakti Vijay Brigade (104 Infantry Brigade) along the Line of Control (LOC) in Jammu and Kashmir in 2012. As a representative of the Indian Army, he had flagged off an educational and motivational tour under Operation Sadhbhavana in Tangdhar area of north Kashmir's Kupwara district. He also attended the prestigious National Defence College, New Delhi.

=== UN Peacekeeping ===
In 2012, Gen Ponnappa was sent to Goma in the Democratic Republic of the Congo as part of India's UN Peacekeeping Force deployment. He was appointed the Commander of MONUSCO's North Kivu Brigade (NKB). During the M23 rebellion in North Kivu, the UN Peacekeepers secured the airport and maintained status quo while the security responsibilities of Goma was shared between the police deployment, the formed police of MONUSCO and the MONUSCO military.

He served under Brazilian Lieutenant General Carlos Alberto dos Santos Cruz and his predecessor Indian Lieutenant General Chander Prakash as Force Commander in March 2013. In 2013, the Indian Army planned and implemented a water treatment plant at Otobora, a Congolese village in Walikale, D R Congo, with MONUSCO's approval. The facility was inaugurated by Brigadier C B Ponnappa on 4 October 2014.

Promoted to the rank of Major general, the general officer took over command of the 28 Infantry Division in Gurez. On promotion to the rank Lieutenant General, he was appointed as the Chief of Staff of the Northern Command. After a stint as COS Northern Command, on 2 January 2021 he took over as the General Officer Commanding Vajra Corps (XI Corps) and relinquished the command of XI Corps on 10 February 2022.

== Awards and decorations ==
Ponnappa was awarded the COAS Commendation Card in 1997 and the GOC-in-C Commendation Card in 2006. In 2017, he was awarded the Vishisht Seva Medal and in 2019, the Ati Vishisht Seva Medal.

| Param Vishisht Seva Medal | Ati Vishisht Seva Medal | | Vishisht Seva Medal |
| Samanya Seva Medal | Special Service Medal | Operation Parakram Medal | Sainya Seva Medal |
| Videsh Seva Medal | 75th Anniversary of Independence Medal | 50th Anniversary of Independence Medal | 30 Years Long Service Medal |
| 20 Years Long Service Medal | 9 Years Long Service Medal | UN Mission in DR Congo Medal | UN Mission in Somalia Medal |

== Gallery ==
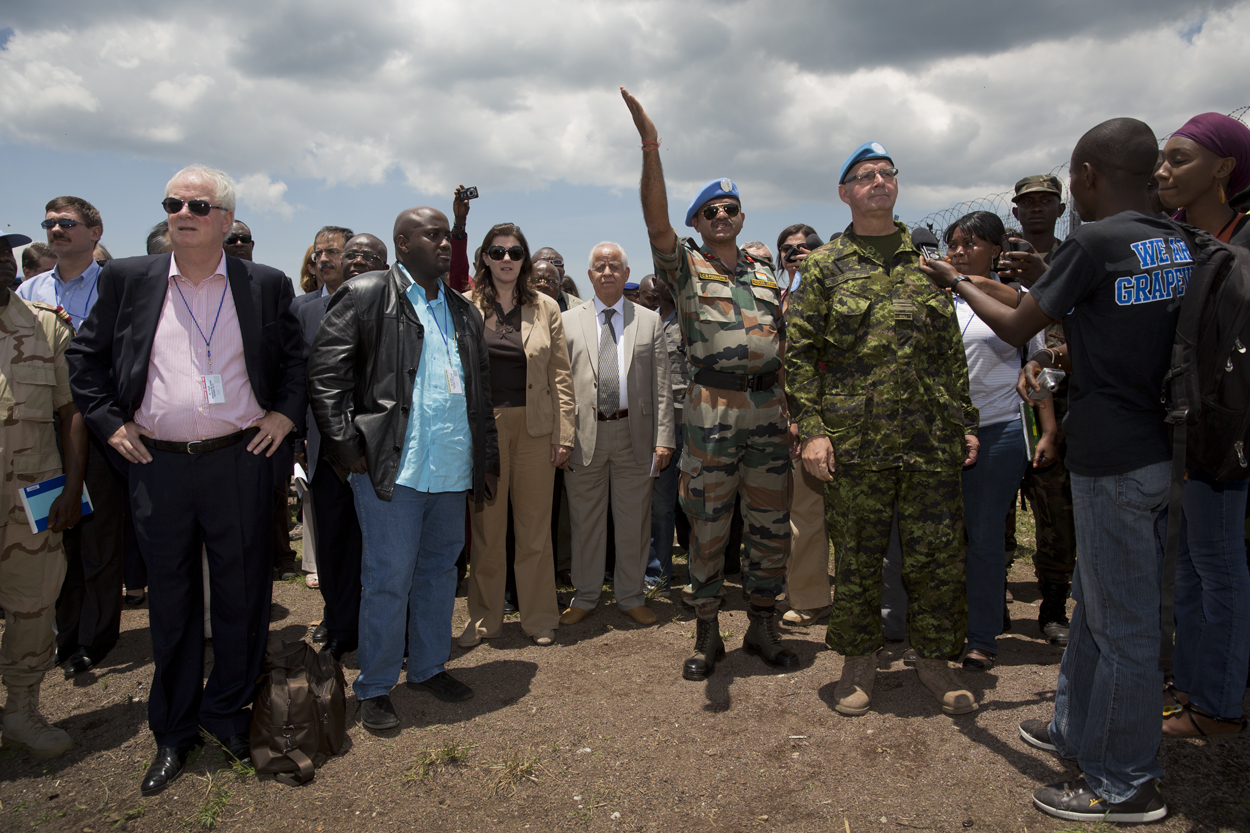
MONUSCO NKB commander, Brigadier General C B Ponnappa, briefs members of UN Security Council as they visit the front line in Kibati near Goma from where the M23 rebels have been recently defeated, 6 October 2013

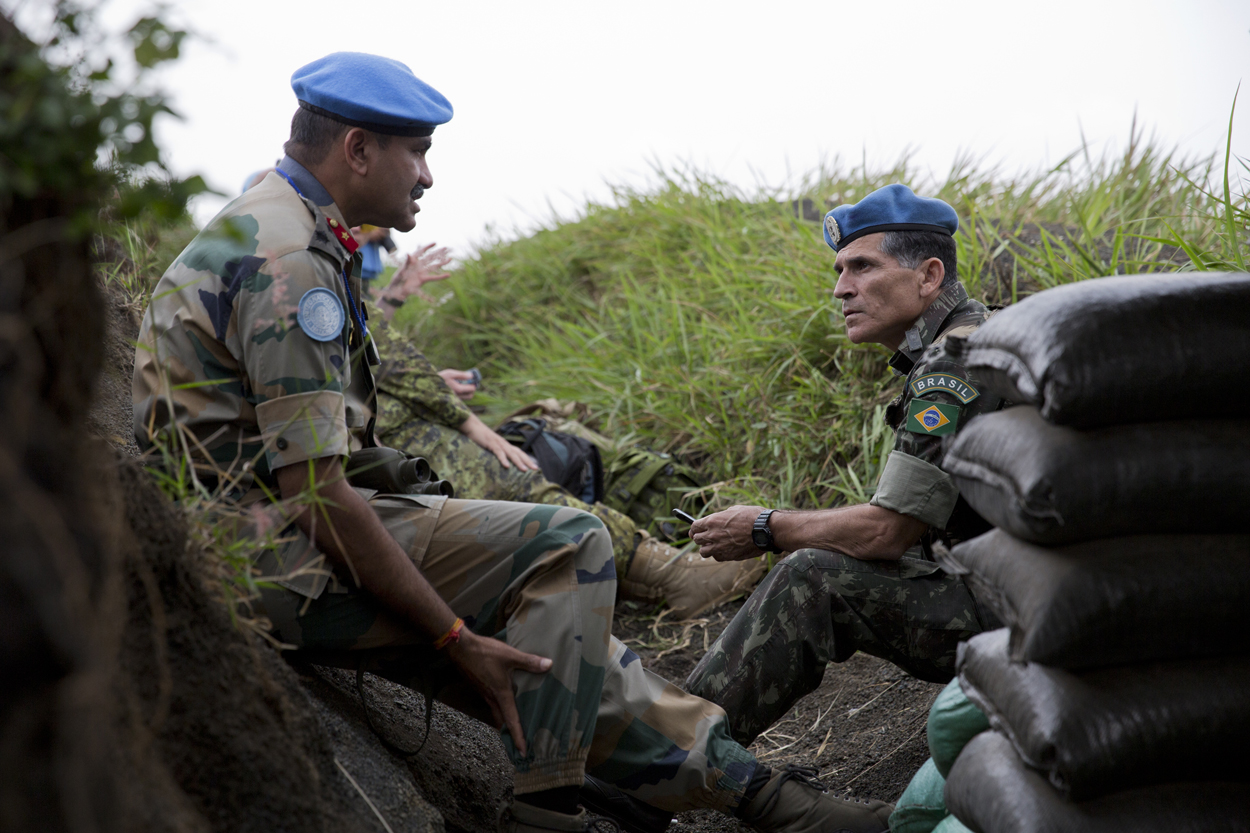
NKB commander, Brigadier General C B Ponnappa and FC Gen. Santos Cruz in the trenches of Munigi hill, 22 August 2013

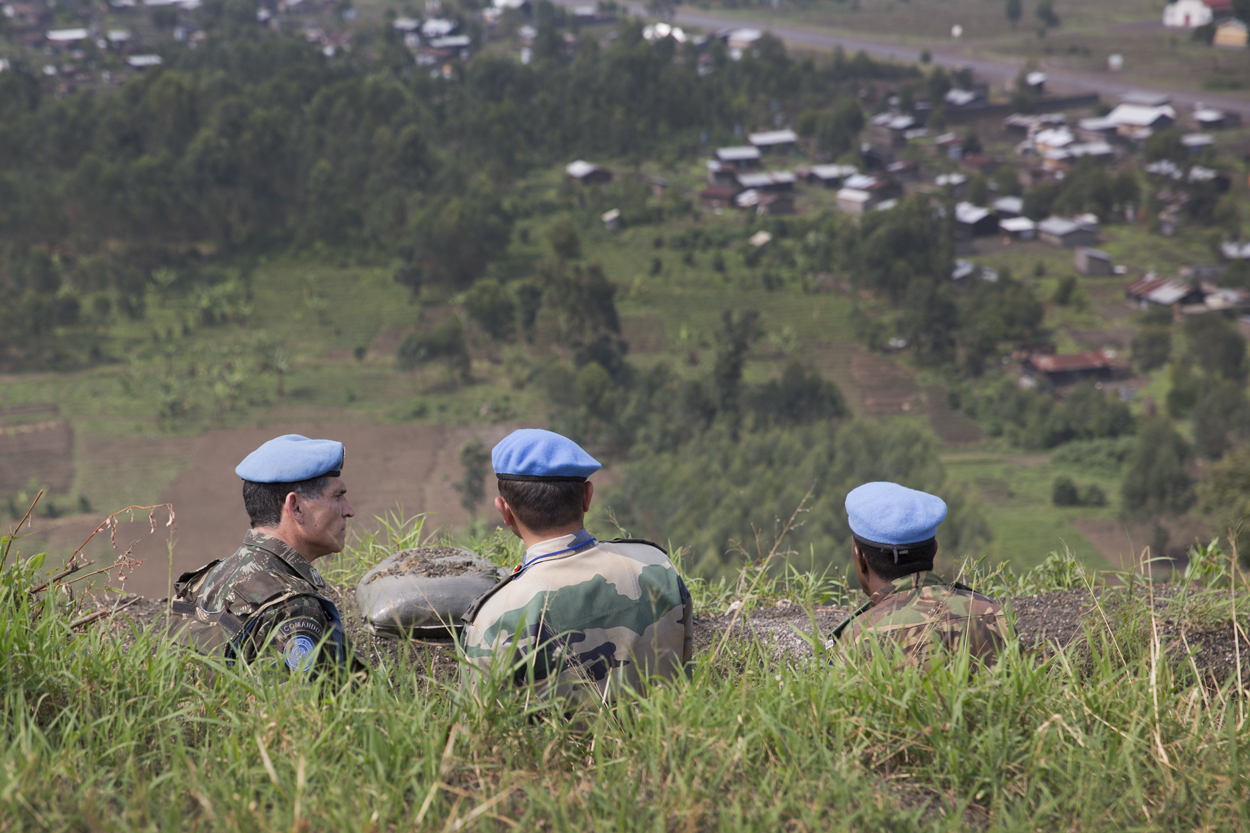
FC Gen. Santos Cruz, NKB commander, Brigadier General C B Ponnappa and FIB commander James Aloizi Mwakibolwa in the trenches of Munigi hill, 22 August 2013

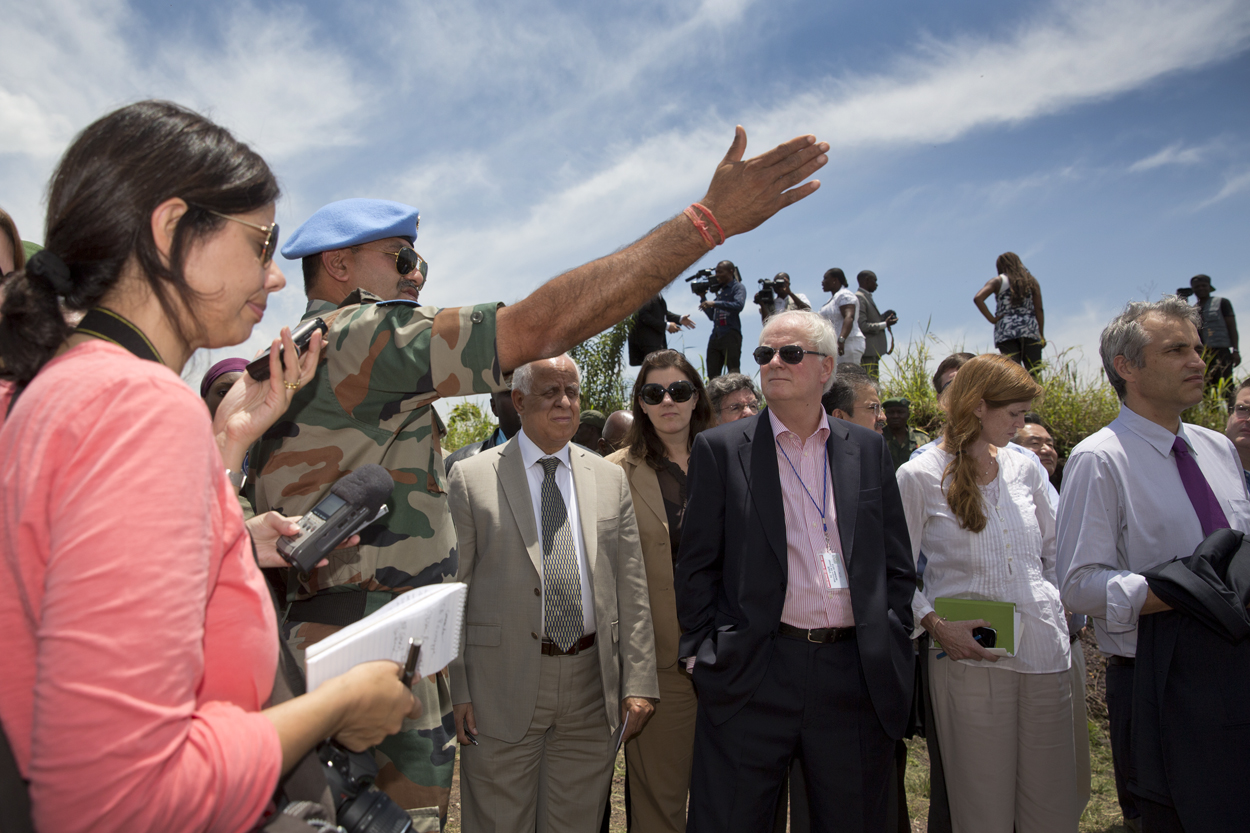
MONUSCO NKB commander, Brigadier General C B Ponnappa, briefs members of UN Security Council as they visit the front line in Kibati near Goma from where the M23 rebels have been recently defeated, 6 October 2013

Military offices
| Preceded by Harsha Gupta | Adjutant General; 2022 - present | Incumbent |
