= Joginder Singh Dhillon =

Indian military officer

- Born: Joginder Singh Dhillon; 19 November 1914
- Died: 20 November 2003 (aged 89)
- Military career
- Allegiance: British India; India
- Branch: British Indian Army; Indian Army
- Service years: 1936–1970
- Rank: Lieutenant-General
- Service number: IC-177
- Units: 11th Light Dragoons; 59th (2nd Nottinghamshire) Regiment of Foot; 16th The Queen's Lancers
- Awards: Padma Bhushan

Lieutenant General Joginder Singh Dhillon (19 November 1914 – 20 November 2003) was an Indian military officer and the first recipient from the military to be awarded India's third highest civilian award, the Padma Bhushan, for his role in the Indo-Pakistani War of 1965, where he was the general officer commanding the XI corps.

== Career ==
Dhillon served overseas in the British Indian Army after his 1939 graduation with honours from Thomason Engineering College in Roorkee. His active service during World War II occurred in Burma, Iran and Iraq, following which he spent some time at the Staff College in Quetta. He served as commander of a field company in Malaya during 1945–1946 and then briefly of another in Surabaya.

From 1946 to 1947, Dhillon served as a staff officer in the Engineer-in-Chief's Office and then returned to Quetta as a garrison engineer. He was promoted to lieutenant-colonel in late 1947, becoming GSO1 in the Engineer-in-Chief Branch from October 1947 to February 1948, before being put in charge of the regimental centre of the Bengal Sappers in Roorkee. This centre was soon to become a part of the newly-created Pakistan and thus there were significant administrative preparations during his time there. Among his significant changes, other than those related to the forthcoming split with Pakistan, were measures to end caste-ist practices and to encourage joint celebration by Sikhs and Hindus of their respective significant religious days.

Jawaharlal Nehru visited the Roorkee centre in 1949 and was so impressed that he asked for Dhillon to command the first Republic Day Parade held in Delhi in 1950. On 6 December 1949, by then a major (temporary lieutenant-colonel and acting colonel) Dhillon was promoted to acting brigadier and given command of a brigade.

Dhillon then commanded two infantry brigades and also served as director of technical development and director of weapons and equipment at army headquarters before being promoted to major general in 1957. As major general, he was selected to attend a course at Imperial Defence College in the United Kingdom, and returned to a posting at the National Defence College. In August 1960, he was given command of a division, and then he became Deputy Chief of General Staff at Army headquarters when he was promoted to GOC, XI corps in Punjab. He was promoted to substantive lieutenant-general on 17 January 1964.

== Role in the 1965 Indo-Pakistani War ==
Dhillon, as commander of XI Corps, was responsible for the Punjab sector during the 1965 India-Pakistan War. He is credited in producing and conducting the battle plan that destroyed or captured over 100 superior Pakistani battle tanks, turning a potentially dangerous defeat into victory, as the Pakistani tanks were poised to head for the Beas Bridge and then on to Delhi.

Frank Moraes, the editor-in-chief of the Indian Express, who spent time on the frontlines, wrote:

I was fortunate to spend some time with Lt General J.S. Dhillon, the corps commander in this sector, and to note and understand how greatly the spirit of all, from jawans to divisional commanders, depends on the calibre of the corps commander. Jogi Dhillon is an enthusiastic, intelligent soldier with a physical vigour, drive and combativeness which enable him to be extraordinarily mobile over his wide command and an inspiring presence and example to his officers and men.

Dhillon was awarded the Padma Bhushan in 1966 for his role in the 1965 Indo Pak war won decisively by India, becoming the first Army officer to receive the award. The citation given for the award was as follows:

In this Sector, the enemy launched repeated counter-attacks and the conduct of day to day operations called for great tenacity, strong determination and robust mind. Lieutenant General Dhillon displayed all these qualities in abundance and the success achieved by his Corps was to a great extent due to the personality of the General officer.

Following the war, Dhillon was promoted to Army Commander of the Central Command, from where he retired on 4 August 1970.

== Personal life ==
Dhillon was married for 62 years to his wife Minnie, who survived him after his death, aged 89, on 20 November 2003. They had three daughters.

== Dates of rank ==
Insignia	Rank	Component	Date of rank
	Second Lieutenant	British Indian Army	1 February 1936
	Lieutenant	British Indian Army	15 April 1938
	Captain	British Indian Army	1940 (acting); 1 December 1940 (temporary); 23 August 1942 (war-substantive); 3 February 1943 (substantive)
	Major	British Indian Army	1 December 1940 (acting); 23 August 1942 (temporary)
	Captain	Indian Army	15 August 1947 (Note: Upon independence in 1947, India became a Dominion within the British Commonwealth of Nations. As a result, the rank insignia of the British Army, incorporating the Tudor Crown and four-pointed Bath Star ("pip"), was retained, as George VI remained Commander-in-Chief of the Indian Armed Forces. After 26 January 1950, when India became a republic, the President of India became Commander-in-Chief, and the Ashoka Lion replaced the crown, with a five-pointed star being substituted for the "pip.")
	Lieutenant-Colonel	Indian Army	September 1947 (temporary)
	Major	Indian Army	1948 (substantive)
	Colonel	Indian Army	1949 (acting)
	Brigadier	Indian Army	6 December 1949 (acting)
	Major	Indian Army	26 January 1950 (recommissioning and change in insignia)
	Lieutenant-Colonel	Indian Army	3 February 1953
	Colonel	Indian Army	3 February 1957
	Brigadier	Indian Army	1953 (acting); 3 February 1958 (substantive)
	Major General	Indian Army	15 January 1958 (acting); 1 June 1960 (substantive)
	Lieutenant-General	Indian Army	23 November 1963 (acting); 17 January 1964 (substantive)

== Notes ==
Military offices
Preceded by T. B. Henderson Brooks	General Officer Commanding XI Corps; 1963–1966	Succeeded by Premindra Singh Bhagat
Preceded by Kanwar Bahadur Singh	General Officer Commanding-in-Chief Central Command; 1966–1970	Succeeded by Premindra Singh Bhagat
