= XI Corps (India) =

Military field formation of the Indian Army

- Vajra Corps formation sign
- Active: 1950 - present
- Country: India
- Branch: Indian Army
- Role: Holding Corps
- Size: Corps
- Part of: Western Command
- Garrison/HQ: Jalandhar
- Nicknames: Vajra Corps; Defenders of Punjab
- Engagements: 2025 India–Pakistan border skirmishes
- Battle honours: Theatre Honour: Punjab; Battle Honours: Dograi; Barki; Asal Uttar; Sehjra; Dera Baba Nanak

Commanders
- Current commander: Lt Gen Amit Kabthiyal; YSM, SM**
- Notable commanders: General Ved Prakash Malik; General Om Prakash Malhotra; Lt Gen Naveen Chand Rawlley; Lt Gen J S Dhillon; Lt Gen T B Henderson Brooks

The XI Corps of the Indian Army is based in Jalandhar and is a part of Western Command. XI Corps is also known as Vajra Corps.

== History ==
XI Corps was raised to take command of the formations in the Punjab in 1950 as India reorganised its post-1947 army to meet the new threat of Pakistan. It was raised on March 1, 1950 at Ambala under the command of Lieutenant General Kalwant Singh. The corps headquarters was relocated to Jalandhar in July 1951.

To reduce the load of XI Corps, X Corps was formed at Bathinda on 1 July 1979, taking over south Punjab and north Rajasthan.

== Formation sign ==
The Corps formation sign consists of the 'red-white-red background' depicting a corps of the Indian Army overlaid by a Vajra, the powerful thunderbolt weapon of Lord Indra, the symbol of sacrifice of the great sage Dadhichi, who voluntarily sacrificed his body to make the fiercest weapon from his thighbone.

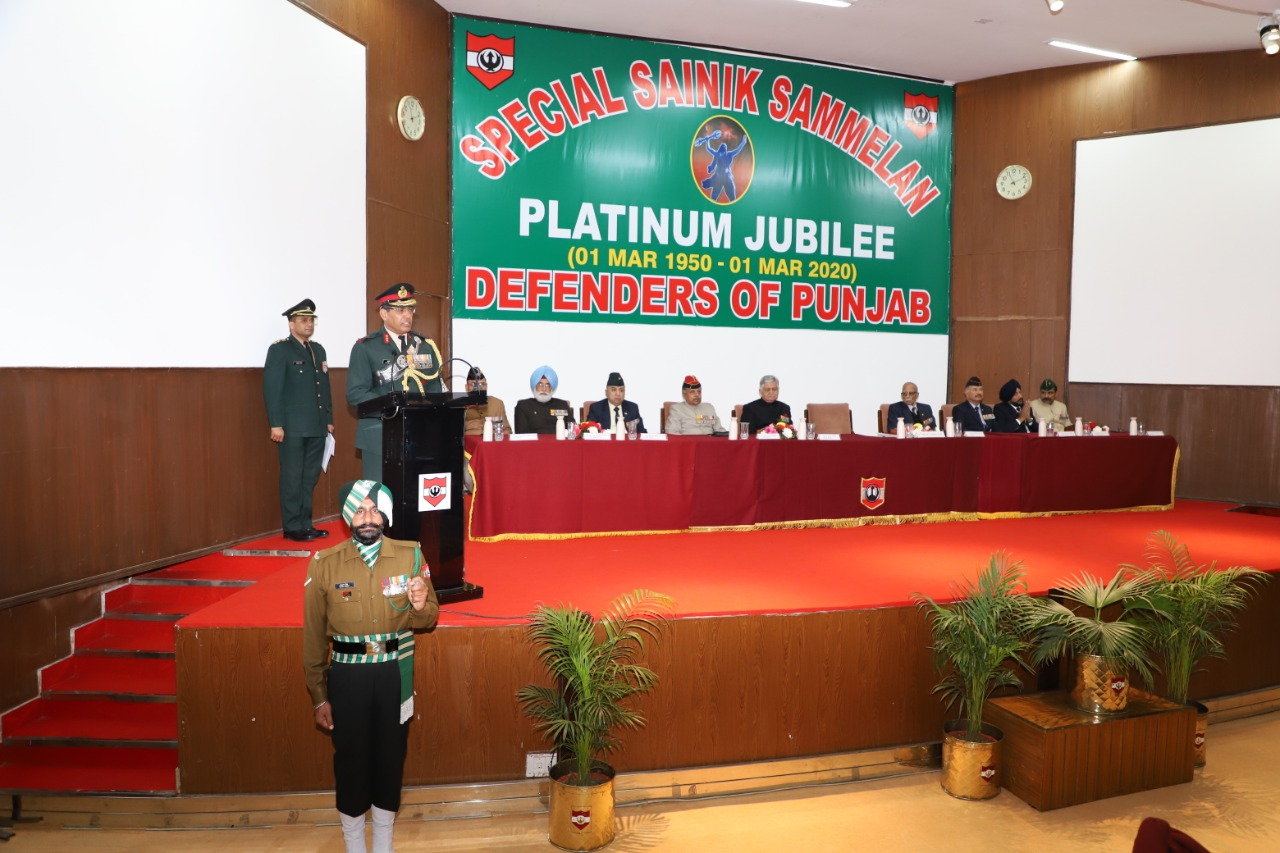
Vajra Corps Platinum Jubilee, 1 March 2020

== Organisation ==
The corps consists of:

- 7 Infantry Division (Golden Arrow Division) headquartered at Firozpur, raised in 1964.
- 9 Infantry Division (Pine Division) headquartered at Meerut. It has one brigade each at Meerut, Delhi and Jalandhar.
- 15 Infantry Division (Panther Division) headquartered at Amritsar. Appears to include 350 Infantry Brigade.
- 23 (Independent) Armoured Brigade (Flaming Arrow Brigade) at Khasa, Amritsar.
- 55 (Independent) Mechanised Brigade (Double Victory Brigade) at Beas
- Corps Artillery Brigade headquartered at Jalandhar
- Corps Air Defence Brigade headquartered at Ludhiana.
- 333 Missile Group equipped with Prithvi-I missile at Secunderabad

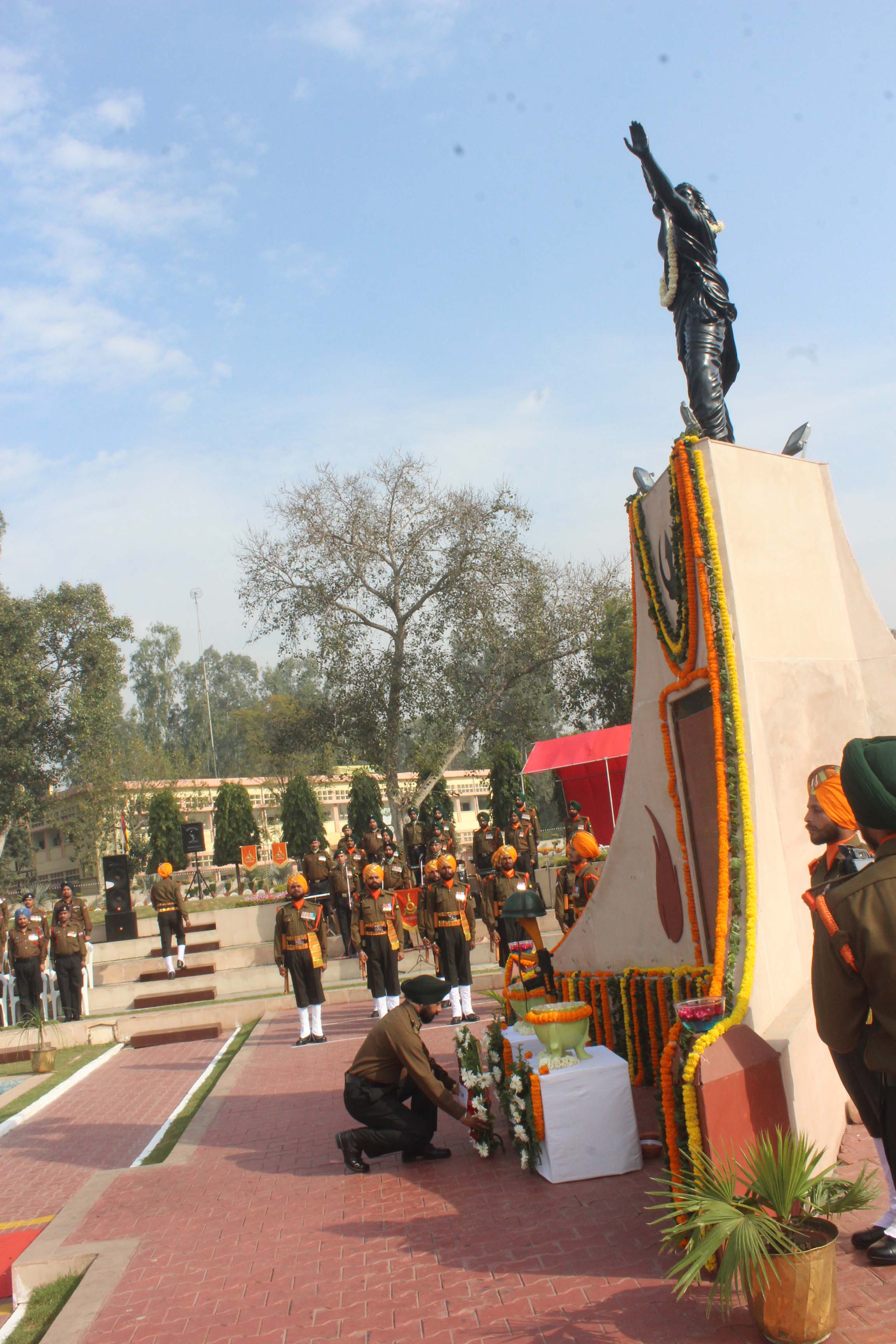
Vajra Shaurya Sthal, Jalandhar Cantonment - the Corps war memorial

== Operations ==
- Indo-Pakistani War of 1965
- Indo-Pakistani War of 1971

== List of Commanders ==
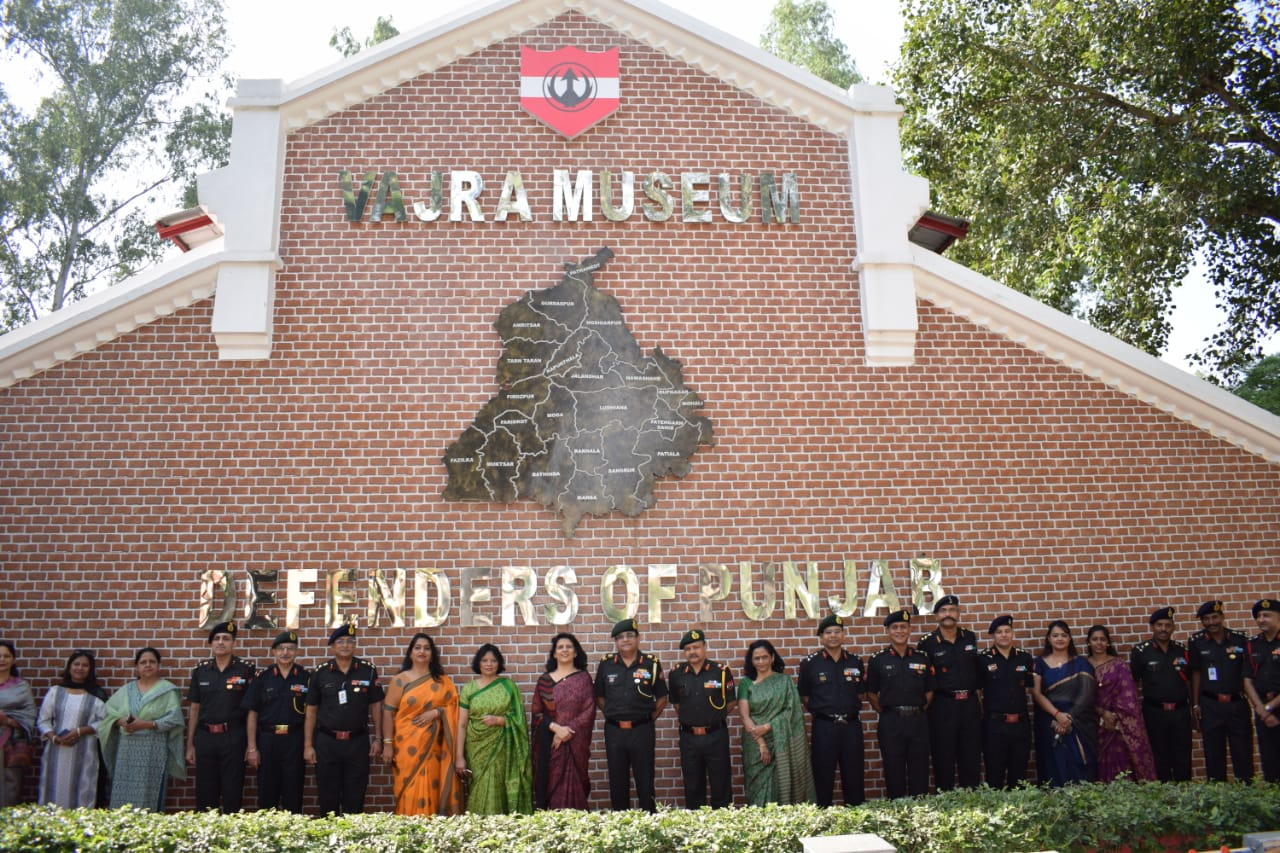
Vajra Museum, Jalandhar

Rank	Name	Appointment Date	Left office	Unit of Commission	References
Lieutenant General	Kalwant Singh	1 March 1950		1st Punjab Regiment	
Lieutenant General	S P P Thorat	1955	May 1957	1/14 Punjab Regiment	
Lieutenant General	T B Henderson Brooks	1962	1963	5th Maratha Light Infantry	
Lieutenant General	Joginder Singh Dhillon	November 1963	August 1966	Bengal Sappers	
Lieutenant General	Premindra Singh Bhagat	August 1966	August 1970	Bombay Sappers	
Lieutenant General	Naveen Chand Rawlley	1970	1972	12th Frontier Force Regiment	
Lieutenant General	Om Prakash Malhotra	May 1972	July 1974	Regiment of Artillery	
Lieutenant General	Krishnaswamy Gowri Shankar	1984	1985	Corps of Signals	
Lieutenant General	V K Nayar	1985	31 October 1987	Parachute Regiment (Note: Originally a Signals officer, General Nayar, after persistent pestering of his bosses, managed a transfer to his desired regiment — the Maratha Light Infantry (MLI), securing a billet with 2 Para (3rd battalion, MLI, converted to paratroop infantry).)	
Lieutenant General	Bakshi Krishan Nath Chhibber	July 1990	September 1992	9th Gorkha Rifles	
Lieutenant General	Ved Prakash Malik	August 1992	March 1994	Sikh Light Infantry	
Lieutenant General	H B Kala	April 1994		Jat Regiment	
Lieutenant General	Virendra Kumar Sewal			Armoured Corps	
Lieutenant General	Kamal Davar	March 2000	April 2001	7th Light Cavalry	
Lieutenant General	Shantonu Choudhry	April 2001	April 2002	Regiment of Artillery	
Lieutenant General	Krishnamurthy Nagaraj	Apr 2002	May 2003	Maratha Light Infantry	
Lieutenant General	S Pattabhiraman	May 2003	May 2004	Bombay Sappers	
Lieutenant General	Parmendra Kumar Singh	May 2004	May 2005	Regiment of Artillery	
Lieutenant General	Mandhata Singh	May 2005	April 2006	9th Gorkha Rifles	
Lieutenant General	Noble Thamburaj	May 2006	September 2007	Bombay Sappers	
Lieutenant General	S S Kumar	October 2007	August 2008	Brigade of the Guards	
Lieutenant General	Virender Singh Tonk	August 2008	July 2009	Rajput Regiment	
Lieutenant General	Ramesh Halgali	24 July 2009	August 2010	Sikh Light Infantry	
Lieutenant General	Munish Sibal	August 2010	November 2011	Rajputana Rifles	
Lieutenant General	Sanjeev Madhok	November 2011	March 2013	Brigade of the Guards	
Lieutenant General	Ashwini Kumar Bakshi	March 2013	July 2014	Bihar Regiment	
Lieutenant General	N P S Hira	August 2014	31 July 2015	Sikh Light Infantry	
Lieutenant General	Jagbir Singh Cheema	21 August 2015	31 August 2016	Sikh Regiment	
Lieutenant General	B S Sahrawat	1 September 2016	2 November 2017	Kumaon Regiment	
Lieutenant General	Dushyant Singh	2 November 2017	4 November 2018	Maratha Light Infantry	
Lieutenant General	Arvind Dutta	5 November 2018	5 November 2019	Dogra Regiment	
Lieutenant General	Sanjeev Sharma	6 November 2019	2 December 2020	Rajputana Rifles	
Lieutenant General	C B Ponnappa	2 December 2020	10 February 2022	Mahar Regiment	
Lieutenant General	Devendra Sharma	11 February 2022	15 May 2023	14th Horse (Scinde Horse)	
Lieutenant General	Vijay B Nair	15 May 2023	30 June 2024	Punjab Regiment	
Lieutenant General	Ajay Chandpuria	1 July 2024	31 March 2026	Dogra Regiment	
Lieutenant General	Amit Kabthiyal	1 April 2026	Incumbent	Garhwal Rifles	
