= Kanwar Bahadur Singh =

Indian general (1910–2007)

- Born: 5 August 1910; Palaitha, British Raj
- Died: 8 May 2007 (aged 96)
- Military career
- Allegiance: India
- Branch: Indian Army
- Rank: Lieutenant-General
- Unit: The Kumaon Regiment
- Commands: Central Command
- Conflicts: World War II; Indo-Pakistani War of 1947
- Awards: MBE
- Other work: Lt. Governor of Himachal Pradesh

Lieutenant-General Kanwar Bahadur Singh (5 August 1910 – 8 May 2007) was a senior officer in The Kumaon Regiment of Indian Army.

== Early life and education ==
Bahadur Singh was born in the Thikana of Palaitha in the princely state of Kotah on 5 August 1910, the son of Major-General Sir Onkar Singh, KCIE, a minister for the state of Kotah. He attended the Prince of Wales Royal Indian Military College (RIMC) from August 1923 to 26 August 1929. During his time at the college, he became Section Commander for Kitchener Section and Cadet Captain. Following his education at RIMC, he gained entrance to the Royal Military College, Sandhurst. He would join Sandhurst as the top student from India.

== Military career ==
Upon graduation from Sandhurst, he was commissioned as a Second Lieutenant on the Unattached List for appointment to the Indian Army on 27 August 1931. He was attached to the 2nd battalion, Highland Light Infantry which was stationed in India for a year before being appointed to the Indian Army and posted to the 4th battalion, 19th Hyderabad Regiment.

He was promoted to Captain on 1 January 1939. His battalion participated in the ill-fated Malayan Campaign. Following their defeat in the Battle of Singapore, he was taken prisoner and spent the remainder of the war in a Japanese internment camp. On 9 May 1946, in recognition of gallant and distinguished services as a prisoner of war, he was appointed a Member of the Order of the British Empire.

He opted for the Indian Army on partition in 1947 and rose up the ranks to serve as GOC-in-C for Central Command from 1962 to 1966 before retiring as a Lieutenant-General.

He was Colonel of the Kumaon Regiment from 16 May 1961 to 15 May 1971.

== Later life ==
After retiring from the army, Lt. Gen. K. Bahadur Singh was appointed Lieutenant Governor of the Union Territory of Himachal Pradesh from 16 May 1967 to 24 January 1971.

He was married to Rajendra Kumari of Barwani and had five children, a son (Kr Jaivir Singh Palaitha) and 4 daughters (Jyostna, Jaya, Padmini & Durga). He died in May 2007 at the age of 97.

== Dates of rank ==
Insignia	Rank	Component	Date of rank
	Second Lieutenant	British Indian Army	27 August 1931
	Lieutenant	British Indian Army	29 April 1933
	Captain	British Indian Army	29 January 1939
	Major	British Indian Army	1946
	Major	Indian Army	15 August 1947 (Note: Upon independence in 1947, India became a Dominion within the British Commonwealth of Nations. As a result, the rank insignia of the British Army, incorporating the Tudor Crown and four-pointed Bath Star ("pip"), was retained, as George VI remained Commander-in-Chief of the Indian Armed Forces. After 26 January 1950, when India became a republic, the President of India became Commander-in-Chief, and the Ashoka Lion replaced the crown, with a five-pointed star being substituted for the "pip.")
	Lieutenant-Colonel	Indian Army	1948 (temporary)
	Colonel	Indian Army	29 January 1949 (acting); 1 January 1950 (substantive)
	Brigadier	Indian Army	13 December 1949 (acting)
	Colonel	Indian Army	26 January 1950 (recommissioning and change in insignia)
	Brigadier	Indian Army	29 January 1952
	Major-General	Indian Army	29 January 1956
	Lieutenant-General	Indian Army	1 August 1958 (acting); 29 January 1959 (substantive)

== Campaign medals ==
- War Medal 1939-1945
- Pacific Star
- Order of the British Empire

== Notes ==
Military offices
New title New office	General Officer Commanding-in-Chief Central Command; 1963 - 1966	Succeeded by Joginder Singh Dhillon
