= Premindra Singh Bhagat =

Recipient of the Victoria Cross (1918–1975)

Lieutenant General P S Bhagat PVSM, VC
- Lt. Gen. P.S. Bhagat, PVSM, VC
- Born: 13 October 1918; Gorakhpur, United Provinces of Agra and Oudh, British India
- Died: 23 May 1975 (aged 56); Kolkata, West Bengal, India
- Relatives: Mirai Chatterjee (niece)
- Military career
- Allegiance: British India (1939–1947); India (1947–1974)
- Branch: British Indian Army; Indian Army
- Service years: 1939–1974
- Rank: Lieutenant-General
- Units: Corps of Engineers
- Commands: Northern Army; Central Army; Indian Military Academy; 165 Infantry Brigade
- Conflicts: World War II: Capture of Gallabat (1940) Indo-Pakistan War of 1947 Sino-Indian War Indo-Pakistan War of 1965 Indo-Pakistan War of 1971
- Awards: Victoria Cross; Param Vishisht Seva Medal
- Other work: Chairman of the Damodar Valley Corporation (1974–1975)

Lieutenant General Premindra Singh Bhagat PVSM VC (14 October 1918 – 23 May 1975) was a general in the Indian Army and an Indian recipient of the Victoria Cross, the highest and most prestigious award for gallantry in the face of the enemy that can be awarded to British and Commonwealth forces. The Victoria Cross was conferred on him for his actions in the Sudan Theatre during World War II.

An alumnus of the famous Prince of Wales Royal Indian Military College Dehradun, Bhagat was the most senior Indian Army officer to be ever awarded the Victoria Cross.

== Early life and education ==
Bhagat was born on 13 October 1918 in Gorakhpur, British India to Surendra Singh Bhagat, an executive engineer in the provincial government of the then United Provinces. His mother died in 1927. In 1930, he entered the Royal Indian Military College, a military school in Dehradun, where he was an average student. In June 1937, he entered the Indian Military Academy. As a gentleman cadet, Bhagat captained the academy tennis and squash teams. While noted by his instructors as an intelligent all-round sportsman, he was also described as a careless student. In January 1938, Surendra Singh Bhagat died in a riding accident in Varanasi.

== Military career ==
Bhagat applied himself to his studies in his final year and was commissioned in the British Indian Army on 15 July 1939 as a Second lieutenant (2Lt.) in the Royal Bombay Sappers and Miners. He was posted to the 21 Field Company of Engineers at Pune in September, shortly after war began in Europe.

=== World War II ===
On 23 September 1940, Bhagat's company was sent to East Africa, as part of the 10th Indian Infantry Brigade, 5th Indian Division, Sudan Defence Force under the overall command of Lieutenant General William Platt. The 10th Infantry Brigade was commanded by Brigadier William Slim, MC (later Field Marshal the Viscount Slim). On 6 November, Slim launched an attack on the fort of Gallabat, with the assault spearheaded by the 3rd Royal Garhwal Rifles, under Lieutenant-Colonel S.E. Taylor. Gallabat was captured, but an enemy counterattack forced the brigade to withdraw. The Sappers were tasked with obstructing the enemy to prevent them from following too closely. At one stage, two broken-down tanks were filled with explosives and placed on a culvert to collapse it and halt the enemy. The charges were detonated, but one tank failed to explode, and the culvert did not collapse. With the enemy closing in, Bhagat dashed out from under cover and, with bullets flying all around him, detonated the remaining explosives and collapsed the culvert. For his heroism, he was recommended for a Military Cross, but it was downgraded to a mentioned in dispatches. After the brigade was relieved by 9th Indian Infantry Brigade in mid-November, it readied for the Battle of Keren.

On 31 January 1941, a mobile column of 3/12 Royal Frontier Force Rifles, including a detachment of 21 Field Company under Second Lieutenant Bhagat, was sent on a reconnaissance mission towards Metemma. Bhagat's Bren carrier passed through a heavily-mined stretch of road and detonated two mines, the second of which destroyed the carrier and killed the driver and a sapper. Bhagat then continued in another carrier and defused mines by hand as the column moved down the road. Under close enemy fire and without food or rest, he worked for four days, clearing a total of 15 minefields over a distance of 55 miles. After having another Bren carrier blown up under him on 2 February, which resulted in punctured eardrums, he was relieved of further duties and evacuated to Khartoum for treatment. He was decorated with the Victoria Cross later that month and presented with the ribbon by General Wavell (later Field Marshal the Earl Wavell), the Commander-in-Chief, India in June at Asmara and formally invested with the decoration by the Governor-General of India, Lord Linlithgow, at Viceroy's House in Delhi on 10 November.

=== Victoria Cross ===
At 22, the Second Lieutenant (King's Commissioned Indian Officer) in the Corps of Indian Engineers, Indian Army, attd. Royal Bombay Sappers and Miners during the Second World War when the following deed took place for which he was awarded the Victoria Cross:

War Office, 10th June, 1941

His Majesty The KING has been graciously pleased to approve of the award of the Victoria Cross to the undermentioned officer: —

Second-Lieutenant Premindra Singh Bhagat, Corps of Indian Engineers (serving with Royal Bombay Sappers and Miners).

For most conspicuous gallantry on active service in the Middle East. During the pursuit of the enemy following the capture of Metemma on the night 31 – 1 January February 1941, Second-Lieutenant Bhagat was in command of a section of a Field Company, Sappers and Miners, detailed to accompany the leading mobile troops (Bren Carriers) to clear the road and adjacent areas of mines. For a period of four days and over a distance of 55 miles this officer in the leading carrier led the Column. During this period, he himself detected and personally supervised the clearing of no less than 15 minefields of varying dimensions. Speed being essential, he worked at high pressure from dawn to dusk each day. On two occasions when his carrier was blown up with casualties to others, and on a third occasion when ambushed and under close enemy fire he himself carried straight on with his task. He refused relief when worn out with strain and fatigue and with one eardrum punctured by an explosion, on the grounds that he was now better qualified to continue his task to the end.

His coolness, persistence over a period of 96 hours, and gallantry, not only in battle, but throughout the long period when the safety of the Column and the speed at which it could advance were dependent on his personal efforts, were of the highest order. — London Gazette: 10 June 1941

On 24 February 1942 in Pune, Bhagat married Mohini Bhandari (b. 1923), the daughter of a colonel in the Indian Army Medical Corps. He spent the remainder of the war away from the front, first as a successful recruiting officer for the Bombay Sappers and then as the commanding officer of 484 Field Company. In mid-1943, the unit was posted to Chhindwara in the Central Provinces for training in jungle warfare for the war in Burma. In January 1945, Bhagat was nominated to attend a course at Camberley Staff College and became one of the first two Indian officers to attend Staff College in the United Kingdom. At the end of the war in August 1945, Bhagat returned to India and attended a course at the School of Military Engineering at Roorkee. He then returned to England in June 1946 to complete a further engineering course and was promoted to substantive captain on 1 July 1946, returning to India in June 1947. Bhagat was the highest decorated officer in the Indian Army at Indian independence.

== Post-Independence ==
After his return to India, Major Bhagat was assigned to the Punjab Boundary Force under Major General Thomas Wynford Rees, trying to maintain law and order in the chaotic region following Indian independence and Partition in August. On 1 September, after the dissolution of the Punjab Boundary Force, Bhagat was promoted to acting lieutenant-colonel and appointed CO of the Royal Engineers, 4th Infantry Division. In July 1948, Bhagat was posted as GSO 1 at the Armed Forces Academy. On 15 February 1949, he was appointed Commandant of the Bombay Sappers at Pune, and he was promoted to substantive major on 28 August 1951. In 1954, he was promoted to lieutenant-colonel and assigned as the Chief Instructor (Army Wing) at the Defence Services Staff College at Wellington. He was promoted to acting brigadier on 11 March 1957 and assigned command of 165 Infantry Brigade at Ramgarh.

He was posted to Army headquarters on 29 August 1959 as Director of Military Intelligence. During his tenure, Bhagat completed a thorough assessment of the Chinese Army's threat to India, but his report was not heeded before the 1962 Sino-Indian War. He was promoted to colonel on 2 February 1959, and to substantive brigadier on 28 August 1961. From June 1961 to May 1962, Bhagat took the National Defence College course and was then posted as Commandant of the Indian Military Academy (IMA). As Commandant of the IMA, he co-authored (with Lieutenant General T. B. Henderson Brooks) the Henderson Brooks-Bhagat Report, an incisive "Operations Review" of the Indian Army during the Sino-Indian War. The report, initially suppressed and still classified top secret, soon led to sweeping changes in the army. On 29 January 1963, Bhagat was appointed Brigadier General Staff (BGS) for an army corps.

=== General Officer ===
Promoted acting major-general on 14 May 1963, he was appointed Chief of Staff (COS) for Eastern Command. He was appointed GOC of a mountain division on 18 September 1964, and promoted to major-general in 1965. He was promoted to the rank of lieutenant general op on 19 May 1967, and subsequently took over as the General Officer Commanding-in-Chief (GOC-in-C) of the Central Command on 4 August 1970. In June 1972, he became the first GOC-in-C of the re-established Northern Command, in Udhampur, Jammu and Kashmir. He was also awarded the Param Vishisht Seva Medal (PVSM).

In January 1973, the Chief of the Army Staff (COAS), Field Marshal Sam Manekshaw was to relinquish office. Although Manekshaw's choice of successor was Lieutenant General Bhagat, however, Lt General Bewoor was senior to Bhagat, but Bhagat could still conceivably become army chief when Bewoor was to retire on his 58th birthday. But, the Government extended Bewoor's tenure by nine months to give him a full two years on the job. By many that was construed as a deliberate manipulation to deny Bhagat the position of COAS. That decision resulted effectively to end Bhagat's army career, as he retired naturally a few months later. Bhagat was a strong General who was also very popular in the army.

== Post-retirement ==
In July 1974, he became Chairman of the Damodar Valley Corporation, a major electric utility company. He arranged to remain in army service while he headed DVC. During his tenure, DVC increased its power production from 45 MW to 700 MW, and its morale and productivity improved greatly. However, after only ten months at DVC, Bhagat died on 23 May 1975 of anaphylactic shock after an injection of penicillin, to which he was allergic, by a careless military doctor. His wife, Mohini Bhagat, presented Bhagat's medals, including his Victoria Cross, to the museum of the Bombay Sappers in Pune on 1 February 1976, where they remain on display.

== Legacy ==
The Indian Army has dedicated a Chair of Excellence in his memory at the United Service Institution of India (USI). USI and the Bombay Sappers also organise the annual Lieutenant General PS Bhagat Memorial Lecture.

== Dates of rank ==
Insignia	Rank	Component	Date of rank
	Second Lieutenant	British Indian Army	15 July 1939
	Lieutenant	British Indian Army	28 November 1940.
	Captain	British Indian Army	28 November 1940 (acting); 15 January 1942 (temporary); 7 April 1943 (war-substantive); 1 July 1946 (substantive)
	Major	British Indian Army	15 January 1942 (acting); 7 April 1943 (temporary)
	Captain	Indian Army	15 August 1947 (Note: Upon independence in 1947, India became a Dominion within the British Commonwealth of Nations. As a result, the rank insignia of the British Army, incorporating the Tudor Crown and four-pointed Bath Star ("pip"), was retained, as George VI remained Commander-in-Chief of the Indian Armed Forces. After 26 January 1950, when India became a republic, the President of India became Commander-in-Chief, and the Ashoka Lion replaced the crown, with a five-pointed star being substituted for the "pip.")
	Lieutenant-Colonel	Indian Army	1 September 1947 (acting); July 1948 (temporary)
	Captain	Indian Army	26 January 1950 (recommissioning and change in insignia)
	Major	Indian Army	28 August 1951 (substantive)
	Lieutenant-Colonel	Indian Army	1954 (acting); 28 August 1956 (substantive)
	Colonel	Indian Army	2 February 1959
	Brigadier	Indian Army	11 March 1957 (acting); 28 August 1961 (substantive)
	Major General	Indian Army	14 May 1963 (acting); 1965 (substantive)
	Lieutenant-General	Indian Army	19 May 1967

== See also ==
- East African Campaign (World War II)

== Sources ==
- Monuments to Courage (David Harvey, 1999)
- The Register of the Victoria Cross (This England, 1997)
- The Sapper VCs (Gerald Napier, 1998)

Military offices
Preceded by Joginder Singh Dhillon	General Officer Commanding XI Corps; 1966 - 1970	Succeeded by Naveen Chand Rawlley
Preceded by Joginder Singh Dhillon	General Officer Commanding-in-Chief Central Command; 1970–1972	Succeeded by H. K. Sibal
New title New office	General Officer Commanding-in-Chief Northern Command; 1972–1974	Succeeded by H. C. Rai
