= Henderson Brooks–Bhagat Report =

Military review of India's performance in the 1962 Sino-Indian War

The Henderson Brooks-Bhagat report (or the Henderson Brooks report) is the report of an investigative commission, which conducted an Operations Review of the Indian Army's operation during the Sino-Indian War of 1962. It was commissioned by General J. N. Chaudhuri, the Acting Army Chief at the time. Its authors were Lieutenant-General T.B. Henderson Brooks and Brigadier Premindra Singh Bhagat, a Victoria Cross recipient and a former director of Military Intelligence. The report was mainly written by Brig. Bhagat.

The Government of India has left the report classified, citing national security reasons. The lessons learned from it were summarised by the defence minister Y. B. Chavan in the Indian Parliament. Journalist Neville Maxwell acquired a copy of Part I of the report and published it on his blog site. The published version was not validated by the Indian government but scholars generally take it to be authentic.

== Investigation ==
The functioning of the Army Headquarters was outside the purview of the commission, as was the civilian direction of the army. The commission had access to the directives issued to the lower levels of the army command but these did not provide information about the political directions given by the civilian authorities.

Scholar Willem van Eeekelen states that General Chaudhuri did not want to "dig too deeply" into the conduct of the top military echelon.

== The Report ==
According to R. D. Pradhan, the private secretary of Defence Minister Y. B. Chavan, the report was in seven bound volumes, along with appendices. There were two copies of the report, one with General Chaudhuri and the second with Chavan under Pradhan's own care.

The leaked version of the report reveals that the report was divided into two parts. Part 1 contained four chapters:

- Chapter I – Western Command
- Chapter II – Eastern Command
- Chapter III – IV Corps
- Chapter IV – Conclusions

Part 2 contained "detailed lessons" in the tactical sphere, written for a more general distribution.

The report was critical of the Indian Army high command of the time as well as of the execution of operations. It states that the Indian government, which would have been keen to recover territory, advocated a cautious policy, but that the Army Headquarters dictated a policy that was militarily unsound.

On 17 March 2014, Australian–British journalist Neville Maxwell posted a portion of the Part 1 the report on his website. (Note: The leaked version contains Chapters I and II, and a portion of Chapter III from Part 1. The Chapter IV (Conclsions) and the entire Part 2 (Detailed Lessons) are missing.) He had acquired a copy of this portion while writing his book India's China War, and included a "gist" of it in the book. In an interview, Maxwell said he had never seen Part 2 but understood it to be "mainly memos, written statements and other documents on which the authors based the report".

== Discussion ==
Some analysts argue that the continuing public controversy over the report indicates that many of the problems identified in the report still continue.

Governments led by Indian National Congress as well as the Bharatiya Janata Party have refused to declassify the report over the decades, claiming that its contents are extremely sensitive and are of "current operational value". BJP leader Arun Jaitley, who had argued for the report's declassification while in opposition changed his stance after his appointment as the Minister of Defence and continued the former policy of classification. A report in The Wire wondered if the BJP's reluctance to release the report indicates that Nehru, their primary political target, was in fact innocent of all blame.

Col. Anil Athale, India's official historian of the 1962 war, stated that the report was fully utilised by him and P. B. Sinha in writing History of the Conflict with China (the "official history" of the war).

== Bibliography ==
- Henderson Brooks, T. B.; Bhagat, P. B. (1963), Operational review (PDF) – via Indian Defence Review
- Hoffmann, Steven A. (1990), India and the China Crisis, University of California Press, ISBN 978-0-520-06537-6
- Maxwell, Neville (14–20 April 2001). "Henderson Brooks Report: An Introduction". Economic and Political Weekly. 36 (14/15): 1189–1193. JSTOR 4410481.
- Pradhan, R. D. (1999), Debacle to Revival: Y.B. Chavan as Defence Minister, 1962–65, Orient Blackswan, ISBN 978-81-250-1477-5
- Van Eekelen, Willem (2015), Indian Foreign Policy and the Border Dispute with China: A New Look at Asian Relationships, Brill, ISBN 978-90-04-30431-4
