= Capture of Gallabat (1940) =

1940 battle of East African Campaign of WWII

- Part of Northern front, East Africa, 1940
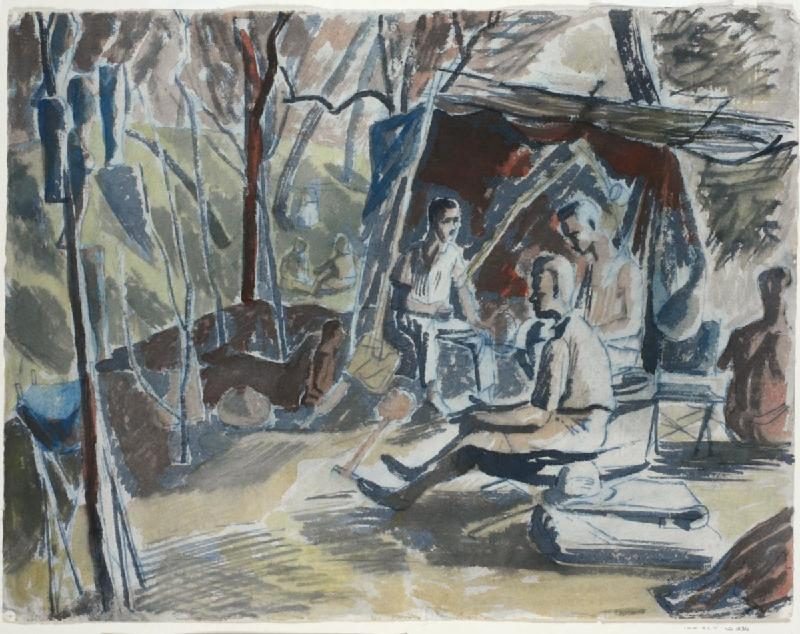
- Painting of British and Indian troops in tents at Gallabat during the Capture of Gallabat
| Date | 6 November 1940 |
| Location | Gallabat, Italian East Africa |
| Result | Italian victory |
| Territorial changes | Annexed to Italian East Africa |

Belligerents
| Kingdom of Italy; Africa | British Empire; India |

Commanders and leaders
| (Kingdom of Italy) Duke of Aosta; (Kingdom of Italy) Luigi Frusci | (United Kingdom) William Slim; (British Raj) P. S. Bhagat (WIA) |

Units involved
| Italian 27th Colonial Battalion | 10th Indian Brigade; 5th Indian Brigade |

Casualties and losses
- The Italian 27th Colonial Battalion that defended Gallabat was destroyed and did not fight again during the East Africa Campaign.

The Capture Of Gallabat was fought in Sudan, near Gallabat, in the Second World War, on 6 November 1940. The operation was part of the East African campaign. The capture led to an Italian occupation that lasted for a few months. On 18 January 1941, forces led by General William Platt re-occupied the town of Gallabat.

== Background ==
=== Anglo-Egyptian Sudan ===
In 1940, the British had three infantry battalions in Sudan and the SDF, which had 4,500 men in 21 companies, the best-equipped being Motor Machine-Gun companies, with light machine-guns mounted in vans, lorries and a few locally made armoured cars; the Sudan Horse was converting to a 3.7-inch mountain howitzer battery. (Note: The SDF comprised the Camel Corps, Eastern Arab Corps, Western Arab Corps and the Equatorial Corps.) Platt held Khartoum with 2nd Battalion, West Yorkshire Regiment, the 1st Battalion, Essex Regiment at Atbara and the 1st Battalion, Worcestershire Regiment at Gebeit and Port Sudan. The SDF garrisoned the frontier with the provincial police and a motley group of irregular scouts, to watch, harass and delay the Italians.

Should the Italians invade, the units would converge against the attackers, exploit distance, the inadequate roads, and supply difficulties, to impede their advance. The Royal Air Force (RAF) had three bomber squadrons, K Flight, 112 Squadron, with six Gladiator fighters at Port Sudan and 430 Flight, 47 Squadron for army co-operation. The aircraft were convenient for Port Sudan and the Red Sea but far from Kassala and Gedaref. In August, 203 Group RAF was formed at Khartoum, to guard the eastern end of the Takoradi air route from the Gold Coast (Ghana), with 1 (Fighter) Squadron, South African Air Force (SAAF), equipped with Gladiators.

=== Italian preparations ===
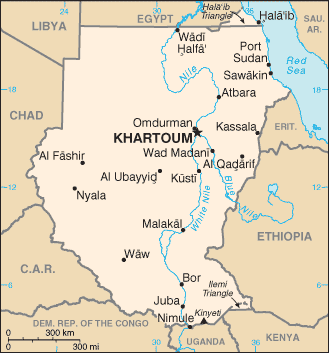
Sudan (CIA WFB Map [2004])

Before the Italian declaration of war, Mussolini intended a defensive strategy in Italian East Africa (AOI), with tactical offensives to protect Eritrea by attacking French Somaliland (Djibouti) and conducting limited attacks on Sudan. The Italian army in the AOI had one metropolitan division, the equivalent of two more European divisions, all short of heavy weapons and transport and seven understrength colonial divisions.

The army was organised in four commands, the Northern Sector in the vicinity of Asmara, Eritrea (Lieutenant-General Luigi Frusci, Comando Truppe dell'Eritrea of the Regio corpo truppe coloniali d'Eritrea, Governor of the Eritrea Governorate and Amhara Governorate), the Southern Sector in the Galla-Sidamo Governorate (General Pietro Gazzera), the Eastern Sector on the border with French Somaliland and British Somaliland (General Guglielmo Nasi) and the Giuba Sector (Lieutenant-General Carlo De Simone) covering southern Somalia near Kismayo, Italian Somaliland.

The Regia Aeronautica had 325 aircraft in the AOI, 142 of which were in reserve (not all operational) with little prospect of more supplies of fuel, ammunition and spare parts. A force was concentrated near the Sudan border for an attack on Kassala, comprising two colonial brigades, four squadrons of cavalry, approximately 24 light tanks, medium tanks and armoured cars and ten batteries of artillery.

=== Italian invasion of British Somaliland ===
The Somaliland Camel Corps (SCC) skirmished with the advancing Italians as the main British force slowly retired. On 11 August, Major-General Reade Godwin-Austen took command as reinforcements increased the British garrison to five battalions with about 4,500 British and Commonwealth troops, 75 per cent being African infantry and Somali irregulars. The main British defensive position was at the Tug Argan Gap, which commanded the road to Berbera and on 11 August, the Italian forces attacked beginning the Battle of Tug Argan. By 14 August, the British were close to being cut off, with only one battalion left in reserve.

On the next day, Godwin-Austen received permission to withdraw from the colony. On 18 August, most of the British and local troops had been evacuated to Aden and the Italians entered Berbera on the evening of 19 August. The British had 38 fatal casualties and 222 wounded; the Italians suffered 2,052 casualties and consumed irreplaceable resources. The British Prime Minister, Winston Churchill, criticised Wavell for abandoning the colony but Wavell called Godwin-Austen's retirement a textbook withdrawal in the face of superior numbers.

== Prelude ==
Gallabat fort lay in Sudan about 200 mi (320 km) south of Kassala, opposite Metemma over the Ethiopian border beyond the Boundary Khor, a dry river bed with steep banks covered by long grass. British orders forbade firing across the frontier if war was declared but the platoon in Gallabat heard over the wireless that it had begun and fired 13,000 rounds from a ridge overlooking Metemma. Both places were surrounded by field fortifications and Gallabat was held by a colonial infantry battalion. Metemma had two colonial battalions and a bande formation, under the command of Lieutenant-Colonel Castagnola. The 10th Indian Infantry Brigade, a field artillery regiment, B Squadron, 6th Royal Tank Regiment (RTR) with six Cruiser tanks and six Light Tank Mk VI, attacked Gallabat on 6 November at 5:30 a.m.

== Battle ==
=== British capture of Gallabat ===
At 5:30 am, on November 6, 1940, British soldiers conducted an attack after bombardment by artillery at 5:30 am. However, the British soldiers could not land at their airfield in Sarai Sayyid, north of Gallabat until 9:00 am because of overnight rain which had made it impossible for them to conduct aerial operations. The preparatory shelling lasted until 6:15 am, when the Garhwal Rifles supported by six medium and four light tanks from the 6th RTR had been able to carry out their assault on the defenders of Fort Gallabat. Most of the tanks were immobilized by either throwing off their tracks or breaking their tracks on rocks during their approach to the fort. Four medium tanks were able to reach Fort Gallabat. The infantry expected the tanks to breach the barbed wire around the fort and when they did not do so immediately, the infantry stalled. Due to the poor visibility, the infantry mistook the tank crews, who had changed from Wolsey helmets to black berets, for Italian Blackshirts (Italian militia). Some troops of the 10th Indian Brigade opened fire on the tank crews as they dismounted from disabled tanks to assess the damage. Some of the Garhwalis made their way into Fort Gallabat and captured it while others remained in a secure position outside the perimeter of the fort.

=== Recapture of Gallabat ===
Gallabat Fort had been captured by the 10th infantry Division but Brigadier William Slim found that Phase II could not be achieved with not enough operational tanks left to crash through the wire defences of Metemma Fort. Operations were suspended to repair the damaged tanks. The 1st Battalion of the Essex Regiment moved into and around Gallabat Fort where the troops continued to find it difficult to dig slit trenches into the rocky ground. The two companies of the Garhwal Rifles who were moving towards the khor were withdrawn more to the high ground surrounding Gallabat Fort. As there were also radio transmissions from Metemma, the Regia Aeronautica bombed Gallabat extensively during the course of the day. All the RAF Gladiator fighters arrived singly against the Italians, rather than together as planned. Five of the Gladiators were shot down by Fiat CR42s that flew from Gondar. Afterwards, it was alleged that the Italians had used incendiary ammunition, which caused a number of the British aircraft quickly to catch fire. The Regia Aeronautica bombed Gallabat and followed it by ground attack that caused many casualties in the 10th Indian Infantry Brigade. The brigade could not hold their positions against the Italian counterattack. They were ordered to withdraw from Gallabat to a ridge 3 mi (4.8 km) to the west. During the withdrawal, the 21st Field Company Royal Engineers was ordered to delay the Italians during the withdrawal.

After the Italian air attack destroyed the workshop truck of 6th RTR which also had spare parts on it and wounded 3 of their mechanics, the 6th RTR could not repair their tanks and Slim therefore had to rethink his plan of attacking Metemma Fort. Slim had previously been considering carrying out a daring night-time thrust on Jebel Mariam Waha (the high ground overlooking the fort), to confound the Italian Commander, before attacking the fort from behind at dawn. Infrastructure has been constructed to facilitate access by troops from the Baluchistan and Sudan regions to the back of the fort, however the staff officers felt that due to the unfit state of one of the battalions and the non-availability of most of their armoured vehicles, it was too risky to undertake this operation. Therefore, upon consideration of all factors and possible adverse consequences, Slim decided to abandon the attack, as should he have been unsuccessful in attacking the fort, this would have allowed the Italians to move into the Sudan region. The 10th Indian Division was withdrawn from Gallabat to a position in which they were under artillery fire range to the Metemma Fort, providing continued pressure to the fort through the use of patrols and bombardments.

== Aftermath ==
In January 1941, British forces started their advance into Eritrea, with Archibald Wavell using deceptions to hide his main thrust to Asmara. While the northern forces advanced towards Keren, the 9th Infantry Brigade was assigned to the southern sector by way of Metemma. After the Italians were defeated at Agordat on 31 January, the Italian commanders realised that the British main effort was at Keren and they began to withdraw toward Gondar. The 9th Infantry Brigade occupied Metemma. The 3/12th Frontier Force Regiment (now the Sikh Light Infantry) (Lieutenant Colonel Blood) had to pursue the Italians and was supported by Lieutenant 2nd Premindra Singh Bhagat and an engineering detachment. The 10th Indian Infantry Brigade, which included units from the 5th Mahratta Light Infantry and the Garhwal Rifles, assaulted Gallabat Fort. The fort was captured but the Indians suffered significant losses.

== See also ==
- East African campaign (World War II)
- Battle of Kassala (1940)
- Tunisian campaign
