= N. C. Rawlley =

Indian General

Lieutenant General N C Rawlley PVSM, AVSM, MC
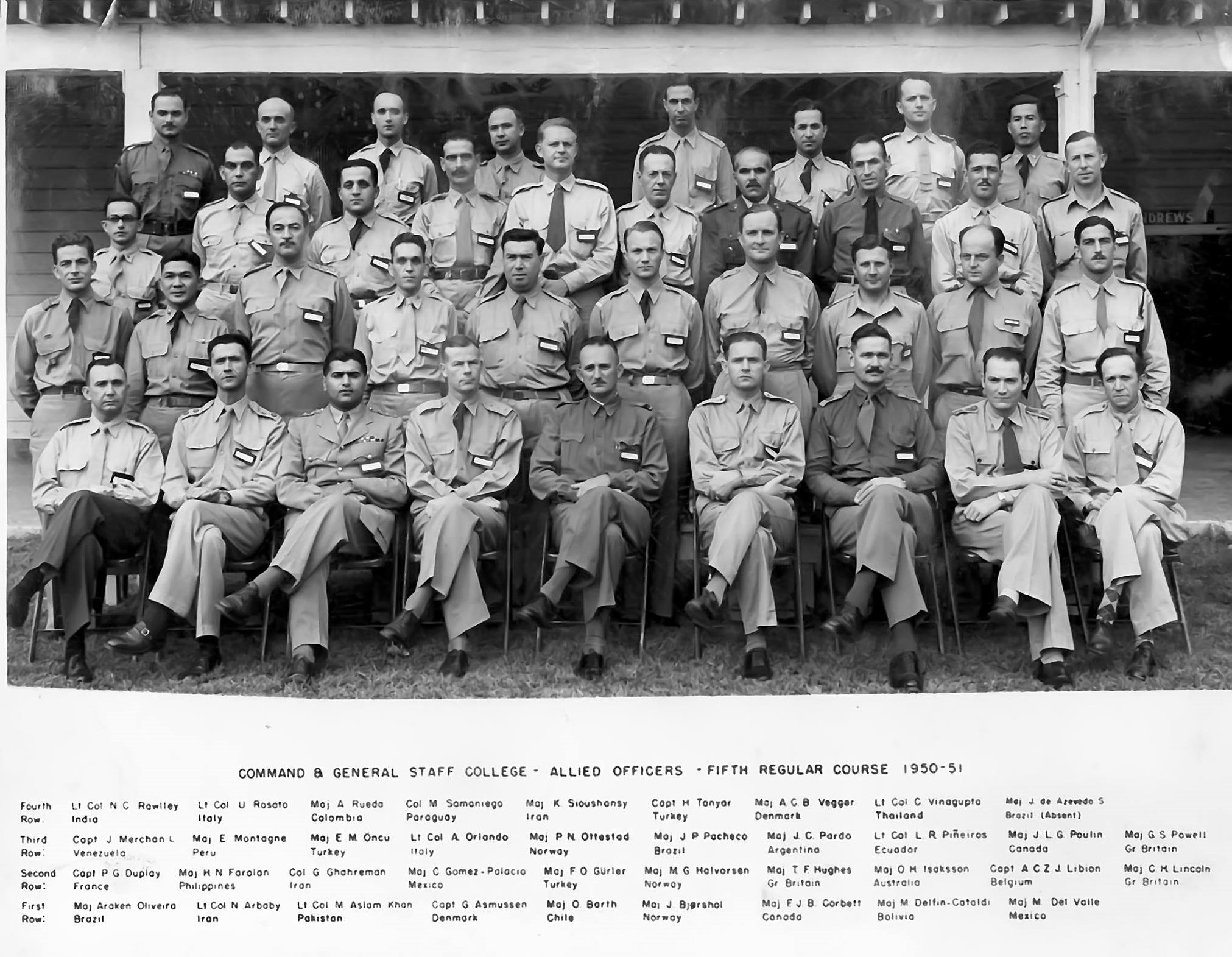
- Lt Col Rawlley, pictured with fellow officers from various countries attending the CGSC (1950–51)

5th Vice Chief of the Army Staff (India)
- In office 1 August 1974 – 31 December 1975

Personal details
- Born: 15 August 1919
- Died: 1 November 2004 (aged 85)
- Education: Bishop Cotton School (Shimla); Indian Military Academy; Staff College, Quetta; US Army Command and General Staff College
- Awards: Param Vishisht Seva Medal; Ati Vishisht Seva Medal; Military Cross

Military service
- Branch/service: British Indian Army (1941–47); Indian Army (1947–75)
- Years of service: 1941–1975
- Rank: Lieutenant General
- Unit: 12th Frontier Force Regiment (until 1947); Brigade of the Guards (after 1947)
- Commands: Eastern Army; XI Corps; 11th Infantry Division; 11th Infantry Brigade; 4 Guards (1 Rajput)
- Battles/wars: World War II; Burma Campaign; Indo-Pakistani War of 1947; Sino-Indian War; Indo-Pakistani War of 1965; Indo-Pakistani War of 1971

Lieutenant General Naveen Chand Rawlley, PVSM, AVSM, MC (15 August 1919 – 1 November 2004) was a General Officer in the Indian Army. He served as the General Officer Commanding-in-Chief Eastern Command before taking over as the 5th Vice Chief of the Army Staff.

== Early life ==
Rawlley was born on 15 August 1919. He attended the Bishop Cotton School in Shimla. He was also educated at Bombay subsequently.

== Military career ==
=== World War II ===
Rawlley graduated from the Indian Military Academy and in 1941, he was commissioned into the 9th Battalion of the 12th Frontier Force Regiment on 15 May. In 1943, the battalion moved to Burma and saw action in the Burma Campaign. He was awarded the Military Cross during the Battle of Kohima. He commanded his battalion during the Battle of Imphal. He then attended the Staff College, Quetta in 1945. After the year-long staff course, he was posted to the 25th Infantry Division. As part of Operation Zipper, the division was chosen for the invasion of British Malaya in an amphibious role. Although hostilities ceased, the operation proceeded as planned and 25th Division was the first formation to land in Malaya, occupying the capital, Kuala Lumpur, and then accepting the surrender of the Japanese Army. Rawlley was mentioned in dispatches for distinguished service in British Malaya.

=== Post-Independence ===
After Independence and the ensuing Partition of India, he opted to join the Indian Army. With the creation of the Brigade of the Guards in 1949, he was assigned to this regiment. Rawlley commanded the Fourth Battalion, the Brigade of Guards, the erstwhile First Battalion, the Rajput Regiment, twice, first from 1949 to 1950, and later from 1956 to 1957.

He attended the United States Army Command and General Staff College in Fort Leavenworth, Kansas. He served as the directing staff at the Defence Services Staff College, Wellington for a period of three years.

He led the Indian Army team of officers which helped set up the Haile Selassie Military Academy in Harar, Ethiopia. After the academy was set up, he served as the first Commandant of the academy. For his outstanding services, the Emperor of Ethiopia, Haile Selassie made Rawlley a Grand officer of the Order of the Star of Ethiopia.

In 1961, he returned to India and took command of the 11th Infantry Brigade. He was awarded the Ati Vishisht Seva Medal (then called Vishisht Seva Medal Class II) in January 1962. During the Sino-Indian War, the brigade fought well in Walong in the Lohit division of the then North-East Frontier Agency. The Battle of Walong was the only counterattack of the war.

Rawlley was appointed Commandant of the Infantry School in Mhow in 1963. After a short stint, he was selected to attended the Imperial Defence College in the United Kingdom. On 1 January 1964, he became the first Colonel of the Regiment of the Brigade of the Guards. Until then the Colonel was the Chief of the Army Staff. After the year-long course, he returned to India and was appointed Director of Military Operations (DMO) at Army headquarters. This appointment was later upgraded to Major General and then to Lieutenant General, and is now termed Director General Military Operations (DGMO).

=== General Officer ===
In May 1965, Rawlley was promoted to the rank of Major General and appointed General Officer Commanding 11th Infantry Division. The division fought in the Rajasthan front during the Indo-Pakistani War of 1965. He took over as the Director of Military training (DMT) at Army HQ in 1969. In January 1970, he was awarded the Param Vishisht Seva Medal for distinguished service of the highest order.

Rawlley was promoted to Lieutenant General in August 1970. He took command of the XI Corps in Jalandhar. In November 1970, he received the salute at the passing out parade of the Haile Selassie Military Academy in Ethiopia. As the first Commandant of the academy, he was a special guest of the Government of Ethiopia. He commanded the corps as part of the Western Command during the Indo-Pakistani War of 1971. In June 1972, he moved to Army HQ as the Quarter Master General (QMG). Rawlley was promoted to the Army Commander grade on 22 January 1973 and was appointed the next General Officer Commanding-in-Chief (GOC-in-C) Eastern Command. He succeeded Lieutenant General Jagjit Singh Aurora and took over as GOC-in-C Eastern Command at Fort William, Calcutta in February.

On 1 August 1974, Rawlley assumed office of the Vice Chief of the Army Staff from lieutenant General M L Thapan. In March 1975, the Government of India decided to appoint Lieutenant General Tapishwar Narain Raina the next Chief of the Army Staff superseding Rawlley. Rawlley was the senior-most Lieutenant General in the Army in May 1975, when General Gopal Gurunath Bewoor retired.

== Personal life ==
Rawlley was married to Sita Rawlley, a well-known golfer. Called the leading light of Indian Women's golf, she won the Ladies All India Amateur Golf championship three time consecutively from 1976 to 1978. Sita was awarded the Arjuna Award in 1977. She represented India on multiple occasions, both as a player and an official. She was a member of the Indian team which participated in the Queen Sirikit Cup in 1981 and 1983.

Rawlley died on 1 November 2004. He was cremated with full military honours.

== Dates of rank ==
Insignia	Rank	Component	Date of rank
	Second Lieutenant	British Indian Army	15 May 1941 (emergency); 15 March 1942 (substantive)
	Lieutenant	British Indian Army	15 March 1942 (war-substantive)
	Captain	British Indian Army	1941 (acting); 15 March 1942 (temporary); 3 February 1944 (war-substantive)
	Major	British Indian Army	15 March 1942 (acting); 3 February 1944 (temporary)
	Lieutenant	Indian Army	15 August 1947 (Note: Upon independence in 1947, India became a Dominion within the British Commonwealth of Nations. As a result, the rank insignia of the British Army, incorporating the Tudor Crown and four-pointed Bath Star ("pip"), was retained, as George VI remained Commander-in-Chief of the Indian Armed Forces. After 26 January 1950, when India became a republic, the President of India became Commander-in-Chief, and the Ashoka Lion replaced the crown, with a five-pointed star being substituted for the "pip.")
	Captain	Indian Army	1947
	Captain	Indian Army	26 January 1950 (recommissioning and change in insignia)
	Major	Indian Army	1954
	Lieutenant-Colonel	Indian Army	15 May 1957
	Colonel	Indian Army	10 May 1957 (acting); 1963 (substantive)
	Brigadier	Indian Army	9 May 1959 (local); 16 January 1961 (acting); 15 May 1964 (substantive)
	Major General	Indian Army	21 December 1966
	Lieutenant General	Indian Army	1 September 1970

== See also ==
- Indo-Pakistani War of 1971
- Sino-Indian War

== Bibliography ==
- Jeffreys, Alan; Anderson, Duncan (2005), The British Army in the Far East 1941–45, Osprey Publishing, ISBN 9781841767901
- Singh, Depinder (2002), Field Marshal Sam Manekshaw, M.C.: Soldiering with Dignity, Natraj Publishers, ISBN 978-81-85019-02-4
- Wilkinson, Steven I. (2015), Army and Nation – The Military and Indian Democracy, Harvard University Press, ISBN 978-0674728806

Military offices
Preceded by Premindra Singh Bhagat	General Officer Commanding XI Corps; 1970–1972	Succeeded by Om Prakash Malhotra
Preceded by Jagjit Singh Aurora	General Officer Commanding-in-Chief Eastern Command; 1973–1974	Succeeded by J. F. R. Jacob
Preceded by M L Thapan	Vice Chief of the Army Staff; 1974–1975	Succeeded by A. M. Vohra
