= Neville Maxwell =

English-born Australian journalist and scholar

- Born: 1926; London
- Died: 23 September 2019 (aged 92–93)
- Education: McGill University; University of Cambridge
- Occupation: Journalist
- Writing career
- Notable work: India's China War

Neville Maxwell (1926–2019) was an English-born Australian journalist and scholar who covered South Asia for The Times of London during 1959–1967, and one of the few who have seen the Henderson-Brooks Report, which was India's internal report of the 1962 border war with China, which is still currently being classified by the Indian government, and publicly unavailable to Indians. After five decades of the Indian government failing to declassify the Henderson-Brooks report, Maxwell later uploaded part of the report online and authored the book India's China War. The book is considered a revisionist analysis of the 1962 Sino-Indian War, putting the blame for it on India. His views received praise in People's Republic of China and in the Richard Nixon administration.

== Early life ==
Maxwell was an Australian born in London. He studied at McGill University, Canada, and the Cambridge University. After graduation, he joined The Times of London, and got posted to its Washington bureau.

== Career ==
In 1959 he was posted to New Delhi as the South Asia correspondent, shortly after the Longju incident, the first Sino-Indian border clash. During the next few years, he reported on the emerging Sino-Indian border conflict, then the end of the Nehru era and the post-Nehru developments in India. During the 1962 Sino-Indian War, Maxwell wrote for The Times from New Delhi and was the only reporter there who did not uncritically accept the official Indian account of events.

In 1967, Maxwell joined the School of Oriental and African Studies, University of London, as a senior fellow to write his book India's China War. He was with the Institute of Commonwealth Studies at Oxford University when the book was published in 1970. He remained at Oxford for at least ten years, and created a visiting fellowship programme for journalists from developing countries.

Regarded as a comprehensive revisionist study, India's China War contradicted the then prevalent understanding of the war as a product of Chinese "betrayal and expansionism", and set out to prove that it was "in fact of India’s making, that it was 'India's China War'". The book drew extensively from India's classified Henderson Brooks–Bhagat Report, an internal operational review of India's military debacle, which Maxwell was able to obtain a copy of. Due to the lack of available information from China, Maxwell had to rely on inferences based on official Chinese statements with regards to China's perceptions. He did not attempt to evaluate the accuracy of these perceptions.

India's China War was widely praised across a diverse range of opinions, including British historian A. J. P. Taylor, Chinese premier Zhou Enlai and US Secretary of State Henry Kissinger. On the other hand, Singaporean leader Lee Kuan Yew considered it "revisionist, pro-China history". In India, the Indian government charged him with breach of the Official Secrets Act, forcing him to stay out of India to avoid arrest until the charges were annulled by Prime Minister Morarji Desai eight years later.

The book was apparently instrumental in bridging the gulf between the US and China. Henry Kissinger had read the book, and recommended it to Richard Nixon. He told Zhou Enlai, "Reading that book showed me I could do business with you people." Nixon too is said to have discussed the book with Zhou Enlai during his 1972 visit to China. Chinese leaders heaped praise on the book. In a banquet in 1971, Zhou En-lai and Zulfikar Ali Bhutto walked up to Maxwell and raised a toast. Zhou said, "your book did a service to truth which benefitted China."

=== Anti-Indian biases ===
Indian journalist Kuldip Nayar, who was a reporter for The Times during the same time that Maxwell was its correspondent in Delhi, says that Maxwell had deep an anti-Indian bias, labelling it an "understatement". He likened him to a British colonial. At the same time, Maxwell was said to have had full praise for China's authoritarian regime. Others that knew him echo similar sentiments.

In 1967, he wrote a series of articles claiming that India's democracy was "disintegating". He said the famine was "threatening", the administration was "strained" and universally believed to be corrupt, the government and the governing party (Indian National Congress) had lost public confidence etc. The experiment of developing India within a democratic was said to have failed. He predicted that the next general election (for the 4th Lok Sabha) would be last one.

=== Leak of the Henderson Brooks–Bhagat report ===
On 17 March 2014, Maxwell posted the first part of the Henderson Brooks–Bhagat Report on his website. The report was written by two Indian army officers in 1963 to examine India's defeat in the Sino-Indian War. It has been classified as top secret by the Indian government, but Maxwell acquired a copy and his India's China War contains the gist of the report. After the Indian government refused to release the report for over 50 years, Maxwell decided to make it public.

== Reception ==
Scholars regard Maxwell's India's China War as a revisionist account of the Sino-Indian War. The earliest accounts of the war regarded China as the aggressor that unleashed its forces on an unsuspecting India. Maxwell inverted the blame, by asserting that India was the aggressor and China the victim.

The book received negative reviews in India. Historian Parshotam Mehra commented that "deeply-rooted prejudice" oozed out of its every sentence, with examples such as:

Hostilities were provoked by India’s reactionary ruling clique which, itself successor to a hateful imperialist regime (British Raj), had been guilty of continuing the latter’s unabashed aggression against a peaceful neighbour....worse still at places, Indian troops in the East crossed the McMahon Line into China’s Tibet region. Nor was that all. For towards Peking’s oft-repeated offers to negotiate and settle the dispute in a spirit of mutual understanding and mutual accommodation, New Delhi’s attitude was one of arrogance, even intransigence. It laid down impossible pre-conditions, including the ridiculous one that China should withdraw from the territory which New Delhi claimed! Provoked beyond patience itself, the Chinese frontier guards fighting in self-defence, wiped out New Delhi’s armed aggression all along the 2,000-mile frontier.

— Neville Maxwell, India's China War

To sustain his narrative, Maxwell cited those facts alone that were convenient and omitted the others. Well-known scholarly analyses such as the Himalayan Battleground or Francis Watson's The Frontiers of China were missing from Maxwell's bibliography, and so too were the writings of men who had first-hand knowledge, such as Sir Olaf Caroe. Notwithstanding these defects, Mehra believed that the book made a contribution as an "alternative point of view to an understanding of the events" that led to the hostilities.

Historian Sarvepalli Gopal, himself a key player in the Sino-Indian dispute as the Head of Indian MEA's historical division, wrote a lengthy rebuttal in The Round Table. He pointed out that the Indian case for its border definition was set out in considerable detail in the Report of the Officials, which Maxwell dismisses with a one-liner and no real analysis.

Historian Srinath Raghavan, Senior Fellow at the Centre for Policy Research, called India's China War a "seminal revisionist account". He argued that Maxwell "overreached" and that he "curiously interpreted Delhi's actions almost as Beijing would have viewed it". Raghavan recommended "post-revisionist" accounts, such as Steven Hoffman's India and the China Crisis.

Shekhar Gupta praised Maxville as a "relentless journalist and scholar" over his findings of the Sino-Indian war. K. N. Raghavan described the book as the "most authoritative work" on Sino-Indian war but also noted that "the pronounced anti-India bias" of Maxwell's work "ensured the book was denied the credibility that such an account should have deserved".

In 2002, Rediff News included a book extract from India's China War in its "Remembering a War" series, with the comment "no account of the 1962 war would be complete without Neville Maxwell's authoritative analysis."

American political scientist John Garver wrote that Maxwell shaped the orthodox scholarly view, which was also reached by American scholar Allen Whiting, regarding China's perception of and response to India's Forward Policy: "in deciding for war, China's leaders were responding to an Indian policy of establishing Indian military outposts in territory claimed by both India and China but already under effective Chinese military occupation." Garver pointed out that Maxwell did not have access to Chinese documents or archives which would have given him insights into their policy making process.

== Publications ==
=== Books ===
- India's China War. London: Cape. 1970. ISBN 978-0-224-61887-8.
- Maxwell, Neville (1979). China's Road to Development. Oxford; New York: Pergamon Press. ISBN 978-0-08-023140-2.
- Maxwell, Neville (1980). India, the Nagas, and the North-East. London: MRG. ISBN 978-0-903114-19-6.
- Maxwell, Neville; McFarlane, Bruce J. (1984). China's Changed Road to Development. Oxford; New York: Pergamon Press. ISBN 978-0-08-030849-4.

=== Selected articles ===
- "China and India: The Un-Negotiated Dispute". The China Quarterly. 43: 47–80. 1970. doi:10.1017/s030574100004474x. S2CID 154434828.
- Maxwell, Neville (1971). "India's Forward Policy". The China Quarterly. 45: 157–163. doi:10.1017/s0305741000010481. S2CID 153895462.
- Maxwell, Neville (January 1971). "The Threat from China". International Affairs. 47 (1): 31–44. doi:10.2307/2614677. JSTOR 2614677.
- Maxwell, Neville (1999). "Sino-Indian Border Dispute Reconsidered". Economic and Political Weekly. 34 (14): 905–918. JSTOR 4407848.
- Maxwell, Neville (2001). "Henderson Brooks Report: An Introduction". Economic and Political Weekly. 36 (14/15): 1189–1193. JSTOR 4410481.
- Maxwell, Neville (2003). "Forty Years of Folly". Critical Asian Studies. 35 (1): 99–112. doi:10.1080/14672710320000061497. S2CID 146537027.
- Maxwell, Neville (2006). "Settlements and Disputes: China's Approach to Territorial Issues". Economic and Political Weekly. 41 (36): 3873–3881. JSTOR 4418678.

== Bibliography ==
- Hoffmann, Steven A. (1990), India and the China Crisis, University of California Press, ISBN 978-0-520-06537-6
- Maxwell, Neville (1970), India's China War, Pantheon Books, ISBN 978-0-394-47051-1 – via archive.org
