= Bittangala =

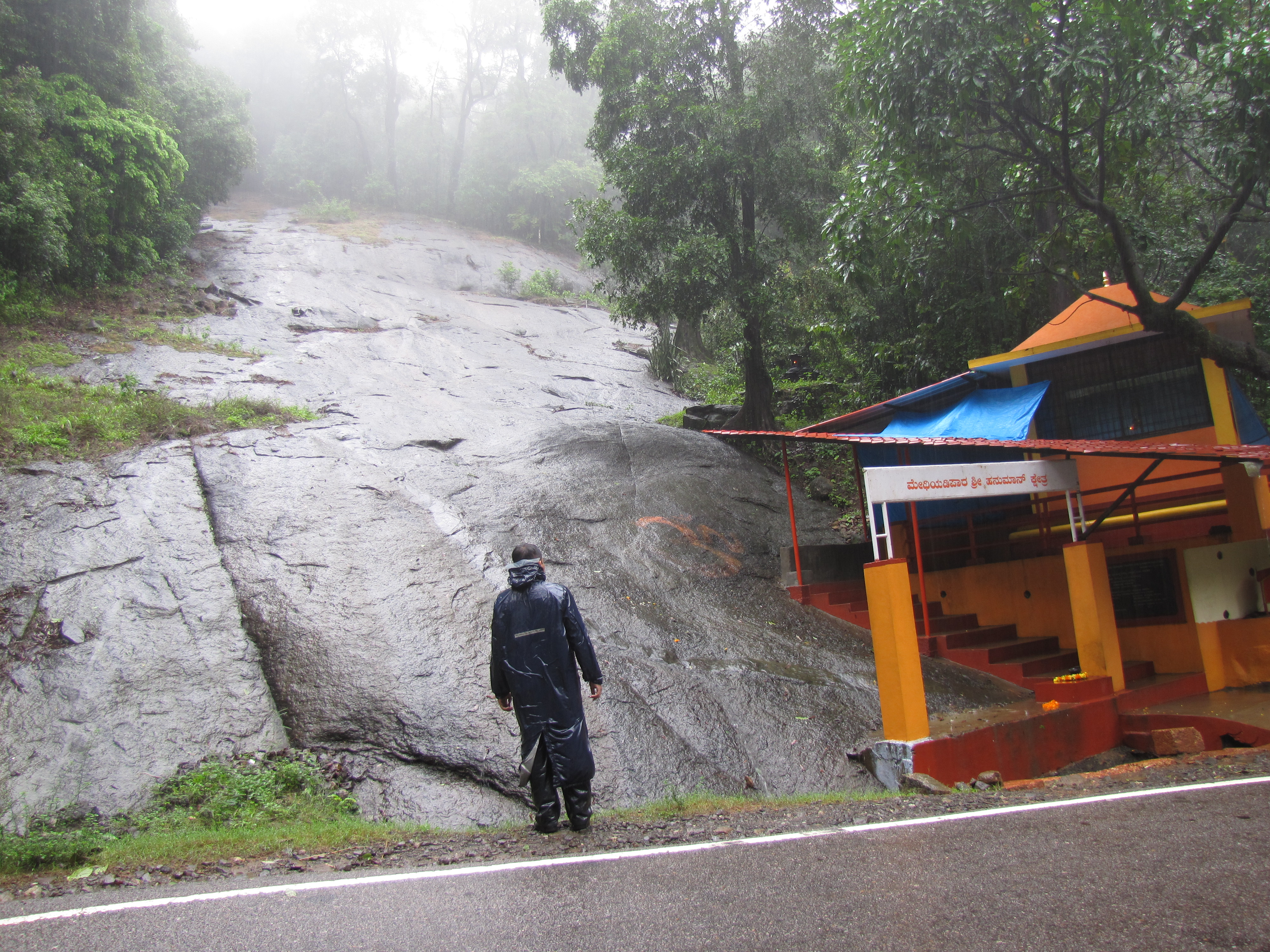
- Hanuman Temple, Perumbadi
- Interactive map of Bittangala
- Coordinates: 12.174425°N 75.832690°E
- Country: India
- State: Karnataka
- District: Kodagu
- Time zone: UTC+5:30 (IST)
- PIN: 571218

Bittangala is a small village in Kodagu district of Karnataka state, India.

== Temples ==
- Methiyadippara Hanuman Temple, Perumbadi

== Location ==
Perumpadi is located near Virajpet town on Gonikoppal road. It is located at a distance of 170 km from the port city of Mangalore.

== Administration ==
Bittangala is administered from Virajpet Taluk. It is five km from Virajpet.

== Suburbs and villages ==
- Balugodu, 5 km
- Ammathi, 8 km
- Chembebellur, 8 km

== Schools ==
- G.H.P.School, Bittangala
