= Brigade of the Guards =

Regiment of the Indian Army

Brigade of The Guards
- Regimental Insignia of the Brigade of The Guards
- Active: 1949 - Present
- Country: India
- Branch: Indian Army
- Type: Foot Guards
- Role: Mechanized Infantry
- Size: 23 battalions
- Regimental Centre: Kamptee, Maharashtra.
- Motto: Pahla Hamesha Pahla (First Always First)
- War Cry: Garud Ka Hun Bol Pyare (I am the son of Eagle, Say O my Beloved)
- Theatre Honours: Jammu & Kashmir - 1947-48, Rajasthan - 1965, Punjab - 1965, East Pakistan - 1971 and Jammu & Kashmir - 1971
- Decorations: 1 Param Vir Chakra, 2 Ashoka Chakras, 1 Padma Bhushan, 8 Param Vishisht Seva Medals, 6 Maha Vir Chakras, 4 Kirti Chakras, 46 Vir Chakras, 18 Shaurya Chakras, 77 Sena Medals, 10 Ati Vishisht Seva Medals, 3 Yudh Seva Medals, 16 Vishisht Seva Medals, 45 Mention-in-Despatches, 151 COAS's Commendation Cards and 79 GOC-in-C's Commendation Cards
- Battle honours: Akhaura, Burki, Gadra Road, Hilli, Naushera, Gurais, Shingo River Valley, Sylhet and Ganga Sagar

Commanders
- Colonel of the Regiment: Major General Pankaj Malhotra, AVSM, SM

Insignia
- Regimental Insignia: Garuda - A mythological eagle king.
- Hackle: Red over Yellow
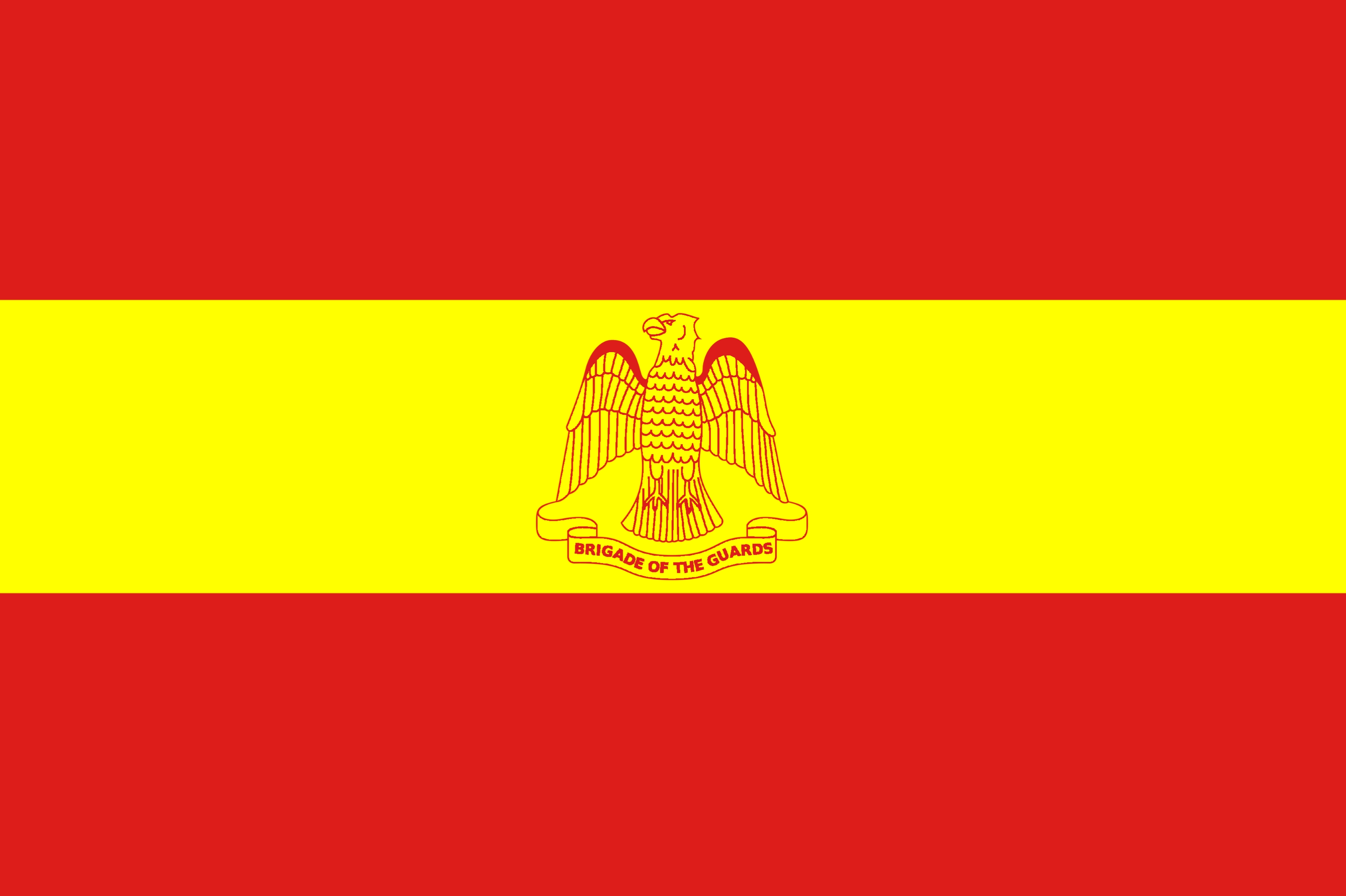
- Flag

The Brigade of The Guards is a mechanised infantry regiment of the Indian Army. It was raised as the first "all India", "all class" infantry unit of the Army where troops from all parts of India serve together, as opposed to other regiments that recruit from specific regions, ethnic groups or religions.

The Brigade of The Guards distinguished itself by being awarded the most battle honours after Indian independence in 1947. The regiment was the brain-child of Field Marshal K. M. Cariappa, who was the first Indian commander-in-chief (C-in-C) and Field Marshal of the Indian Army. He raised the Brigade of the Guards and coined the phrase – The Guards, The Elite.

The President of India is the Honorary Colonel-in-Chief and the Chief of Army Staff is the Colonel-in-Chief of The Guards. The Guards Regimental Centre is at Kamptee in Maharashtra. The Brigade of The Guards was the senior most line infantry regiment of the Indian Army before its selection and conversion to the mechanised infantry role. It now holds the title of the senior most infantry regiment in an honorary/ceremonial capacity. Together with the Mechanised Infantry Regiment, they form part of the Mechanised Infantry arm, which along with the Armoured Corps form the Mechanised Forces.

== History and raising ==
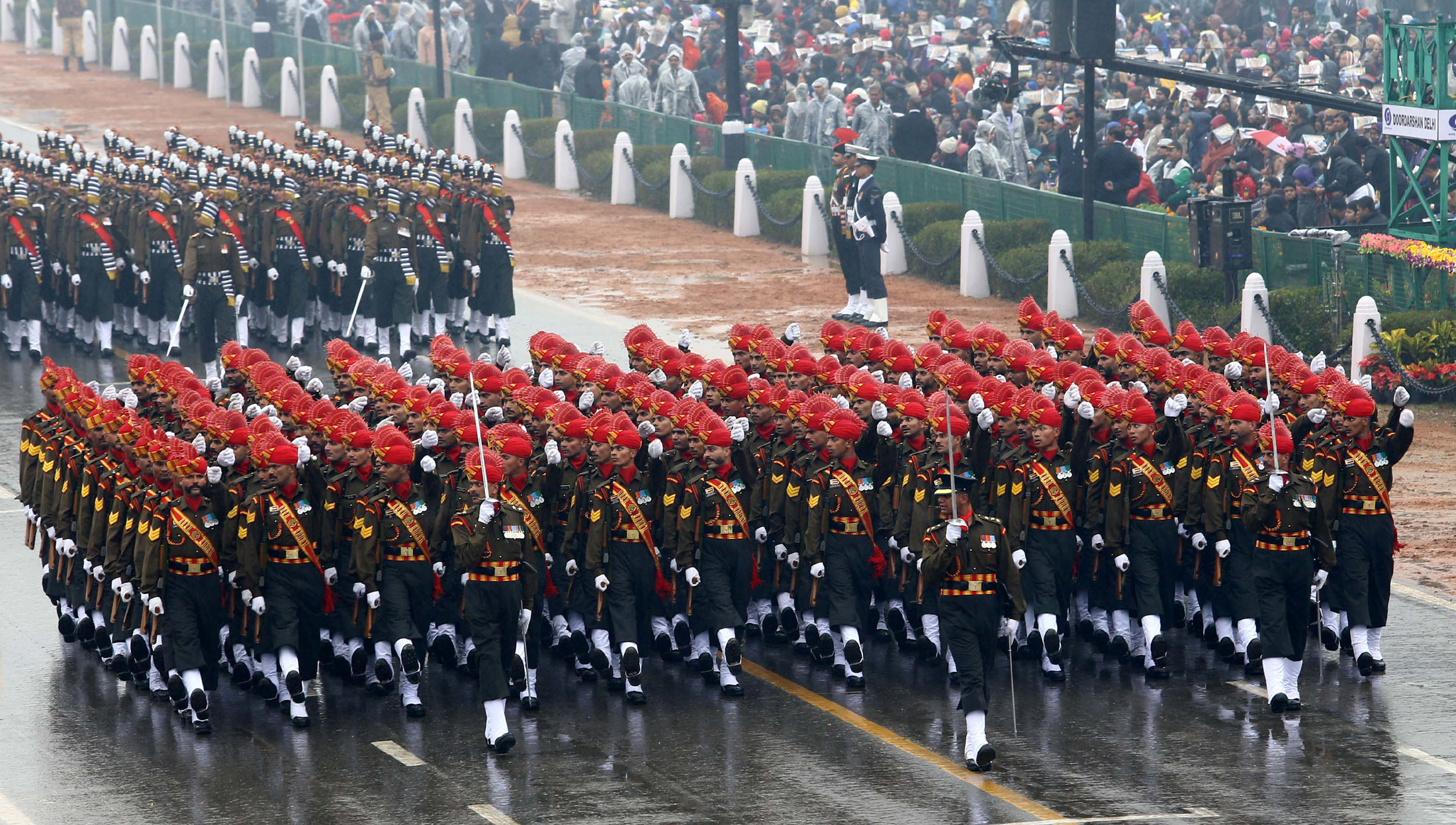
The Guards marching contingent passes through the Rajpath during the 66th Republic Day Parade, 2015

The Brigade of Guards was raised in 1949 on the lines of the elite Guards units of the world, particularly, the Coldstream Guards of the British Army's Guards Division. The regiment was raised to implement the government's policy of encouraging Army recruitment from classes and regions which had been under-represented in the forces. Raised as The Guards Brigade, the old system of class composition was replaced with recruitment open to all regions, castes, creeds, and sections of society.

Prior to the raising of the Guards, Indian Army infantry regiments derived their name and troop composition from region, religion or sub-caste. There was a message with its formation that the country comes before everything else, including religion and caste. The regiment was formed as the first mixed class Indian regiment to be raised after Indian independence by Field Marshal KM Cariappa OBE. Three of the Army's oldest and most distinguished battalions were converted as Guards battalions in 1949:

- 2nd Battalion, Punjab Regiment - 1st Battalion
- 1st Battalion, The Grenadiers - 2nd Battalion
- 1st Battalion, Rajputana Rifles - 3rd Battalion

A year later, they were joined by the 1st Battalion, Rajput Regiment as the 4th Battalion. It was the only regiment of foot guards in the Indian Army. Though the Brigade of The Guards is only 70 years old, its constituent battalions go back as far as 225 years and between them share 93 battle honours earned around the globe.

From its raising till 1964, the Colonel of the Regiment was the serving Chief of the Army Staff. On 1 January 1964, Brigadier (later Lieutenant General) NC Rawlley became the first Colonel of the Regiment of the Brigade of the Guards. The Chiefs of the Army Staff continue to be the Honorary Colonels of the Brigade of Guards.

Currently the Brigade of the Guards consists of 23 regular battalions and 2 territorial battalions and 1 RR (Rashtriya Rifles) battalion. In the 1980s, the Indian Army began to increase the number of mechanized infantry battalions on its order of battle. As part of this program, the battalions of the Brigade of Guards were eventually converted to mechanized infantry.

== Regimental Centre ==
Soon after its raising, the Brigade of the Guards Regimental Centre was started as a training company at the Rajputana Rifles Training Centre at Delhi Cantonment on 6 June 1950. It was later upgraded to the Guards Training Wing at the same location. The centre then moved to Kota, where it became operational on 11 June 1956. The centre moved to its present location in Kamptee near the city of Nagpur in October 1976. After their initial infantry training, Guardsmen undertake their mechanised conversion at Mechanised Infantry Centre and School at Ahmednagar.

== Operations ==
=== 1971 Liberation War ===
In the 1971 war, the Brigade of the Guards participated in actions on both the Eastern and the Western fronts. The 14th Guards earned their first PVC ( Param Vir Chakra) through L/Nk Albert Ekka of Bravo Company, for heroism in the Gangasagar theatre Near TRIPURA: he single-handedly turned the tide against Pakistani defenders firing downrange with LMG's and MMG's from the top of a fortified structure, putting the entire operation in jeopardy.

=== Operation Blue Star (1984) ===
This was an Indian military action carried out between 1 and 8 June 1984 to capture the extremist Sikh leader Jarnail Singh Bhindranwale and his followers along with demolition of the buildings of the Harmandir Sahib (Golden Temple) complex in Amritsar, Punjab.

The 10th battalion under Lt. Col. Ishrar Rahim Khan was located in Jalandhar in 1984 and moved to Amritsar to assist the civil administration. Along with 1 Para, 10 Guards moved in from the north entrance to the temple and, though suffering heavy casualties, achieved their objectives. The unit was awarded one Ashok Chakra (Capt. Jasbir Singh Raina), one Kirti Chakra and three Shaurya Chakras. Total casualties suffered by the unit were 19 killed and 50 wounded.

=== UN operations and counter-insurgency operations ===
One the first deployments overseas, both for this newly formed regiment as well as for the newly independent India, was to Indo-china, where the 2nd Bn. was posted, in 1954, to support the International Control Commission: India was the lead-nation for the project, and from its own history was well-aware of how risky the task of Partition could be. Detachments of the battalion provided both security and an air of authority to the various subordinate headquarters in North Vietnam, South Vietnam, Laos and Cambodia, and the all-India regiment exemplified the national commitment to a fraught operation.

The Brigade of the Guards has also taken part in UN peace keeping operations in Gaza and Angola.

The regiment has also been used in counter-insurgency operations within India.

== Regimental battalions ==
The regiment currently consists of a total of 23 battalions for Regular Army, one for Rashtriya Rifles and two for Territorial Army. The majority of these operate as standard mechanized infantry, 6 operate in the reconnaissance and support role (3 wheeled and 3 tracked), one is equipped as an anti-tank guided missile (ATGM) battalion and three (including two territorial army battalions) remain as infantry. Today, the regiment is one of three in the Indian Army that is made up of men from the different castes and regions of India.

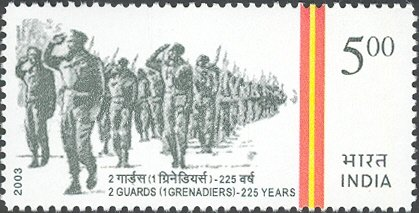
2003 postal stamp to commemorate '225 years of 2nd Battalion of the Guards (1 Grenadiers)'.

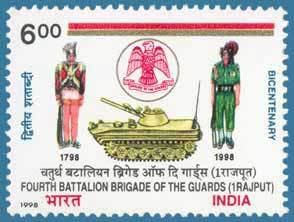
1998 postal stamp to mark the bicentenary of 4th Battalion of the Guards (former 1st battalion, 7th Rajput)

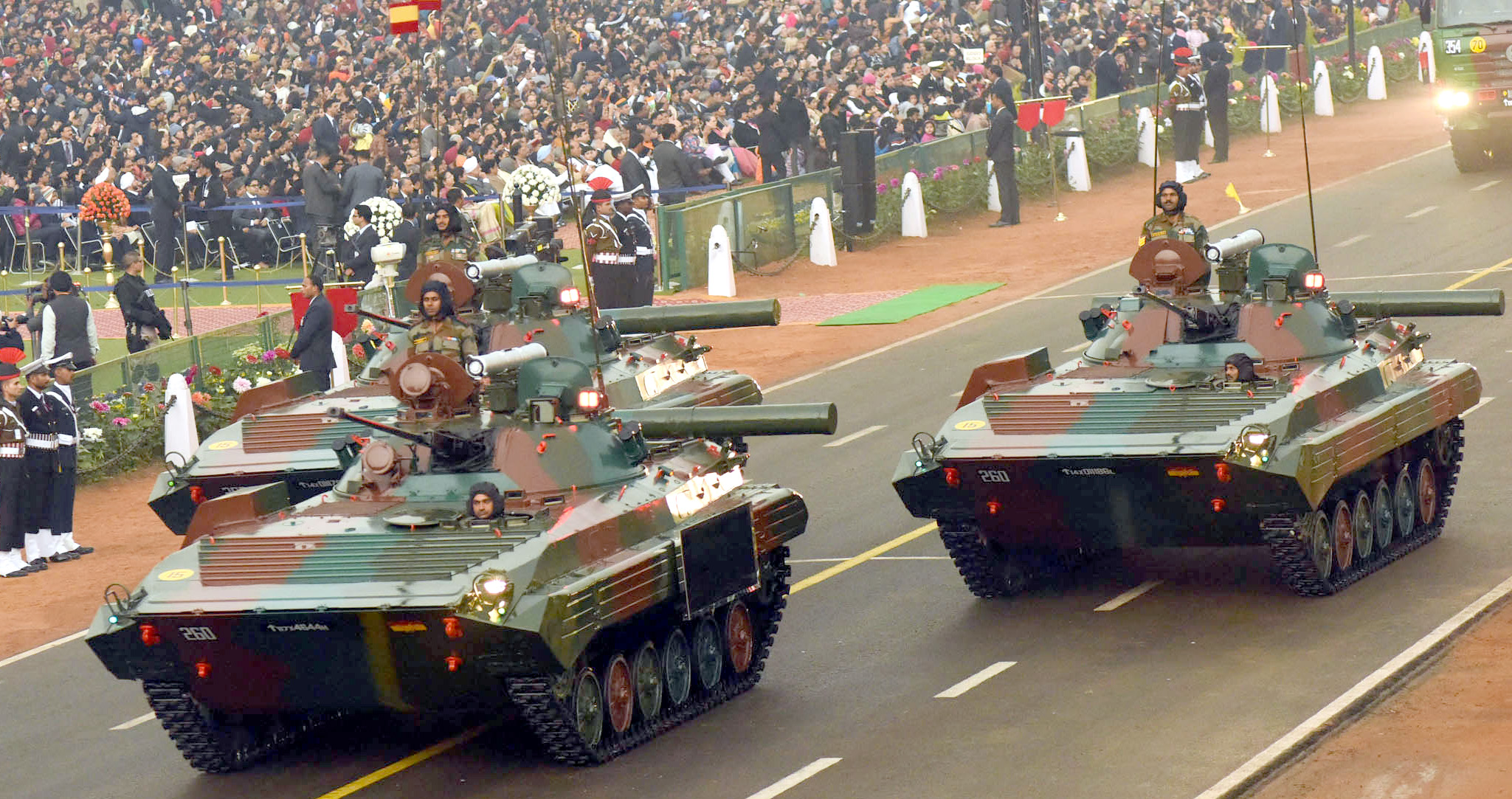
The contingent of the 10th Battalion, Brigade of the Guards on BMP-2 passes through the Rajpath, on the occasion of the 68th Republic Day Parade, 2017

The list of battalions is as follows:

Battalion	Raising Date	Former designations	Remarks	References
1st Battalion	1759 (Note: The Indian Army List, 1923 gives the date of raising between 1762 and 1765.)	10th Battalion Coast Sepoys (1759), 10th Carnatic Battalion (1769), 9th Carnatic Battalion (1770), 9th Madras Battalion (1784), 1st Battalion, 9th Madras Native Infantry (1796), 9th Madras Native Infantry (1824), 9th Madras Infantry (1885), 69th Punjabis (1903), 2nd battalion, 2nd Punjab Regiment (1922), 2 Punjab	Raised at Madura (now Madurai). Battle honours - 31 - Pre-independence - Carnatic, Sholinghur, Mysore, Ava, Pegu. (Note: Incomplete list) Post independence – Naushera. Designated as 1 Guards on 1 April 1951, mechanised in March 1994.	
2nd Battalion	22 Nov 1778 (Note: The Indian Army List, 1923 gives the date of raising as 1779.)	8th Regiment of Bombay Sepoys (1778), 8th Grenadier Regiment of Bombay Sepoys (1783), 1st Grenadier Regiment of Bombay Native Infantry (1793), 1st Grenadier Bombay Infantry (1901), 101st Grenadiers (1903), 1st Battalion, 4th Bombay Grenadiers (1922), 1st Battalion, The Grenadiers.	Raised at Bombay. Battle honours - Mangalore, Mysore, Hyderabad, Kandahar 1880, Afghanistan 1878–80, Burma 1885–87, Somaliland 1901–04, East Africa 1914–16, Egypt, Gaza, Megiddo, Nablus, Palestine 1917–18. Post independence – Gurais. Became 2 Guards on 1 August 1952.	
3rd Battalion	10 Jan 1775	5th Battalion, Bombay Sepoys (1775), 9th Battalion, Bombay Sepoys (1778), 2nd Battalion, 2nd Regiment of Bombay Native Infantry (1796), 4th Bombay Native Infantry (1824), 4th Bombay Infantry (or Rifle Corps) (1885), 4th (1st Battalion Rifle Corps) Bombay Infantry (1889), 4th Bombay Rifles – (1901), 104th Wellesley's Rifles (1903), 1st Battalion, 6th Rajputana Rifles (1921), 1st Battalion, Rajputana Rifles (1945)	Battle honours (pre-independence) 28; (post-independence) – Gadra Road. 3 Guards on 1 September 1949, mechanised in December 1991.	
4th Battalion	1798	2nd Battalion, 15th Regiment of Bengal Native Infantry (1798), 31st Bengal Native Infantry (1824), 31st Bengal Native (Light) Infantry (1858), 2nd Bengal Native (Light) Infantry (1861), 2nd (The Queen's Own) Regiment of Bengal Native (Light) Infantry (1876), 2nd (The Queen's Own) Regiment of Bengal (Light) Infantry (1885), 2nd (Queen's Own) Rajput Regiment of Bengal (Light) Infantry (1897), 2nd (Queen's Own) Rajput Light Infantry (1901), 2nd Queen Victoria's Own Rajput Light Infantry (1911), 1st light infantry battalion, 7th Rajput Regiment (1922), 1st battalion, Rajput Regiment (1947).	Raised at Sasaram. Battle honours (pre-independence) - Delhi 1803, Laswaree, Deig, Bhurtpore, Khelat. Afghanistan, Maharajpore, Punjaub, Chillianwallah, Goojerat, Central India, Afghanistan 1879-80, Burma 1885-87, China 1900; (post-independence) – Akhaura. The battalion has won two Victoria Crosses and one Param Vir Chakra. Designated 4 Guards on 26 January 1950.	
5th Battalion	1960		Reconnaissance & Support, battle honour – Burki.	
6th Battalion				
7th Battalion	1 Jan 1963		Raised at Kota, Rajasthan; mechanised in 2003. Battle honour – Shingo River Valley.	
8th Battalion	1 Oct 1963		Raised at Kota, Rajasthan; mechanised in 1998. Battle honour – Hilli.	
9th Battalion	1 Apr 1964		Raised at Kota, Rajasthan. Battle honour – Sylhet.	
10th Battalion	1 Jan 1965		Raised at Kota, Rajasthan; mechanised in 1988. Ashok Chakra Battalion.	
11th Battalion	1 Jun 1966		Raised at Babina, Uttar Pradesh as a para commando battalion, then converted to regular infantry; mechanised in 2011.	
12th Battalion			Reconnaissance & Support	
13th Battalion	4 Jan 1968	31st Battalion, Brigade of the Guards (I)	Raised as a specialised unit for counter-insurgency operation in the Northeast. Now in regular mechanised infantry role.	
14th Battalion	13 Jan 1968		Param Vir Chakra battalion, battle honour – Ganga Sagar.	
15th Battalion			Reconnaissance & Support	
16th Battalion				
17th Battalion	1981		Nicknamed Tank Busters. Raised in Kamptee as a specialised anti tank guided missile battalion, first to be equipped with MILAN. Had deployed 9 missile detachments during Kargil War. Converted to Reconnaissance & Support role after mechanisation.	
18th Battalion	1985			
19th Battalion	1985		Reconnaissance & Support	
20th Battalion	?2016			
21st Battalion			Rashtriya Rifles	
22nd Battalion				
23rd Battalion				
24th Battalion	1966	17th battalion, The Grenadiers	Raised as a camel battalion in Bikaner. Nicknamed The Desert Hawks. Motorised Infantry Regiment. Became 24 Guards in 2023. Reconnaissance & Support battalion.	
117th Battalion	1960		Territorial Army (based at Tiruchirapalli), nicknamed the Trichy Terriers.	
125th Battalion			Territorial Army (based at Tirumalagiri, Secunderabad)	

== Traditions ==
Crest

The regimental crest consists of the image of Garuda with a scroll below inscribed ‘BRIGADE OF THE GUARDS’. Garuda is a mythological bird and is the mount of the Hindu God Vishnu. It symbolises the values of invulnerability, immortality, elegance, strength, courage and vitality.

Uniform

The uniform of the Brigade of The Guards includes a yellow and red lanyard on the right shoulder. Instead of a brass title on the epaulette, guardsmen wear red arm titles with the words ‘THE GUARDS’. The rank slides are embroidered in red over olive green straps. The green beret (common to all infantry units in India) has the regimental crest on a red-yellow-red vertical striped diamond base stitched to the beret and a red over yellow hackle. Guardsmen wear brass buttons on the uniform instead of the traditional green buttons. The regimental turban is worn by personnel during ceremonial occasions, parades, on guard duty and by those in the regimental band. It consists of a red background with yellow and red stripes.

Regimental tune

The four senior battalions and the Guards Training Centre each have their own march past for the Pipes and Drums. The 1 GUARDS plays Nachtlager En Grenada, 2 GUARDS plays Back O’Benachie, 3 GUARDS plays With Wellesley’s Rifles at Keren, 4 GUARDS plays The Cock O’ the North, and the Guards Training Centre plays Hundred Pipers. In 1966, the Brigade adopted the march past of the 2nd Guards Back O’ Benachie for the Pipes and Drums. The Cariappa March was approved for the Brass Band of the 3rd Battalion and the centre in 1970.

Colours

1 GUARDS was the first and as of 2020, is the only battalion to receive Colours from the President of India in front of the Red Fort in New Delhi, with the colours being presented on 20 September 1962. The centre and the 2nd to 14th battalions received colours from President VV Giri at Kota on 16 March 1973. Battalions 15 to 19 were presented with colours by COAS General Gopal Gurunath Bewoor at Kamptee.

== Gallantry awards ==
Param Vir Chakra

- Naik Jadunath Singh - 1st battalion, 7th Rajput Regiment, later 4 Guards
- Lance Naik Albert Ekka - 14 Guards

Ashoka Chakra

- Captain Jasbir Singh Raina - 10 Guards

Maha Vir Chakra - 6

- Lieutenant Kishan Singh Rathore - 1st battalion, 7th Rajput Regiment, later 4 Guards
- Lance Naik Nar Bahadur Chhetri - 12 Guards
- Lieutenant Colonel Shamsher Singh - 8 Guards
- Second Lieutenant Shamsher Singh Samra - 8 Guards
- Lance Naik Ram Ugrah Pandey - 8 Guards

Kirti Chakra - 4

- Captain Dinesh Prasad Mathur - 1 Guards
- Captain Ransher Singh Ranawat - 9 Guards
- Lieutenant Colonel Israr Rahim Khan - 10 Guards
- Havildar Sarwan Singh - 10 Guards

Others

- Padma Bhushan - 1
- Param Vishisht Seva Medal - 8
- Vir Chakra - 46
- Shaurya Chakra - 18
- Sena Medal - 77
- Ati Vishisht Seva Medal - 10
- Yudh Seva Medal - 3
- Vishisht Seva Medal - 16
- Mention-in-Despatches - 45
- COAS's Commendation Cards - 151
- GOC-in-C's Commendation Cards - 79

== Battle honours ==
=== Pre-independence ===
Delhi 1803; Selinghar; Carnatic; Mysore; Ava; Pegu; Suez Canal; Nels, Krithia; Laos; Aden; Point-551; Kanghaw; Naushera; Mangalore; Hyderabad; Gaza; Megiodo; Nablus; Curais; Seringapatnam; Beurabone; Punjab; Mooltan; Persia; Reshire; Khooshab; Central India; Basra; Shaiba; Ctesiphon; Defence of Kut-Al-Amara; Sidi Barrani; Keren; Cassino; Castele Hill; Leswarree; Deig; Bharatpore; Khelat; Mahrakpore; Chilianwallah; Goojerat; Punjab; Egypt 1876–1917; British East Africa 1878; Afghanistan 1878–80; Kandahar 1880; Burma 1891; China 1900; East Africa 1914–1916; Mesopotamia 1914–1918, Egypt 1915, Gallipoli 1915, France and Flanders 1915, Kutal Amarah 1915; Palestine 1916–1918; Tigris 1916; Macedonia 1918; Afghanistan 1919; Donbaik 1943; Italy 1943–45; Burma 1945; Jammu and Kashmir 1947–1948.

=== Post-independence ===
Akhaura, Burki, Gadra Road, Hilli, Naushera, Gurais, Shingo River Valley, Sylhet and Ganga Sagar.

== Notable Officers ==
- Lieutenant General Naveen Chand Rawlley PVSM, AVSM, MC - GOC-in-C Eastern Command, 1973 - 1974 and Vice Chief of the Army Staff, 1974 - 1975
- Lieutenant General Walter Anthony Gustavo Pinto PVSM - GOC-in-C Central Command, 1980 - 1982
- Lieutenant General Suraj Prakash Malhotra PVSM - GOC-in-C Northern Command, 1980 - 1982
- Lieutenant General AK Handoo PVSM - GOC-in-C Northern Command, 1985 - 1987
- Lieutenant General CN Somanna PVSM - Deputy Chief of the Army Staff, 1985 - 1986
- Lieutenant General KB Mehta PVSM - GOC-in-C Central Command, 1986 - 1987
- Lieutenant General OP Nandrajog PVSM, AVSM, VSM - GOC-in-C Central Command, 2006 - 2008
- Lieutenant General SR Ghosh PVSM, AVSM, SM - GOC-in-C Western Command, 2009 - 2012
- Lieutenant General Ashok Singh PVSM, AVSM, SM, VSM - GOC-in-C Southern Command, 2013 - 2015
- Lieutenant General Sanjeev Madhok PVSM, AVSM, VSM - GOC-in-C Army Training Command, 2013 - 2015
- Lieutenant General Surinder Singh PVSM, AVSM, VSM - GOC-in-C Western Command, 2016 - 2019
- Lieutenant General Iqroop Singh Ghuman PVSM, AVSM - GOC-in-C Central Command, 2019 - 2021
- Lieutenant General JB Chaudhari PVSM, SM, VSM - Deputy Chief of Army Staff (Capability Development and Sustenance), 2022 - 2024

== See also ==
- List of regiments of the Indian Army
