= T. B. Henderson Brooks =

Indian Army general (1909–1997)

Lieutenant General T B Henderson Brooks PVSM
- Born: 11 January 1909
- Died: 5 January 1997 (aged 87)
- Military career
- Allegiance: British India (1929–1947); India (1947–1964)
- Branch: British Indian Army; Indian Army
- Service years: 1929–1964
- Rank: Lieutenant-General
- Unit: 5/5 Mahratta Light Infantry
- Commands: Eastern Army; XI Corps; 20 Infantry Division; 161 Infantry Brigade (India)
- Conflicts: World War II; Indo-Pakistani War of 1947

Thomas Bryan Henderson Brooks PVSM (11 January 1909 – 5 January 1997) was a General Officer in the Indian Army. He is best known for authoring the still-classified Henderson Brooks-Bhagat Report, along with Brigadier P S Bhagat (later lieutenant general). At the time, Henderson Brooks was the commander of XI Corps, based in Jalandhar. The report is an internal operational analysis of the Indian Army after the Indian defeat in the 1962 Sino-Indian War. He was an Anglo-Indian and a second-generation Indian Army officer. He was also an excellent sportsman and reached the 3rd round of the men's singles at the 1938 Wimbledon Tennis Championships.

== Early life ==
Thomas Bryan Henderson Brooks was born in Burma, the son of Captain Thomas Henderson Brooks, Indian Medical Department (1872-1943).

== Military career ==
He attended the Royal Military College, Sandhurst, and was commissioned a second lieutenant on to the Unattached List for the Indian Army on 29 August 1929. Arriving in India on 13 October 1929, he was attached on 14 October 1929, to the 2nd Battalion of the Duke of Wellington's Regiment of the British Army stationed in India.

He was accepted into the Indian Army and posted to the 5th battalion 5th Mahratta Light Infantry on 5 November 1930. He was promoted lieutenant 29 November 1931. He was appointed an Assistant Recruiting Officer from 1 January 1935 to 14 October 1936. He was promoted Captain 29 August 1938 (the date of promotion was later antedated to 1 August 1938).

He was appointed acting major 15 September to 14 December 1941, then temporary major from 15 December 1941 By October 1942, he was serving with the 3rd battalion 5th Mahratta Light Infantry. He was promoted substantive major 29 August 1946 (the date of promotion was later antedated to 1 July 1946).

After the 1947 Partition, he opted for the Indian Army. As a temporary lieutenant colonel (acting brigadier), he was appointed Commander, 161 Infantry Brigade based in Uri during the Kashmir War General Officer Commanding Patiala and East Punjab States Union (PEPSU) Forces on 6 December 1949, with the local rank of major general. He was promoted to colonel on 1 January 1950 and to major-general on 29 August 1954. As a major general, he would later command the 20th Infantry Division.

As a lieutenant general, he commanded Eastern Army from 8 November 1963 to 14 March 1964. He was awarded the Vishisht Seva Medal I on 5 March 1964, which was subsequently renamed the Param Vishisht Seva Medal (PVSM) in 1967.

== Later life ==
After retirement, he emigrated to Australia, where he died on 5 January 1997.

Military offices
Preceded by L P Sen	General Officer Commanding-in-Chief Eastern Command; 1963-1964	Succeeded by P P Kumaramangalam
