= General Singh =

General Singh may refer to:

- A. K. Singh (born 1953), Indian Army general
- Ajai Singh (lieutenant general) (fl. 1980s–2020s), Indian Army lieutenant general
- Ajai Singh (born 1934), Indian Army lieutenant general
- Akali Phula Singh (1761–1823), Sikh Khalsa Army senior general
- Baj Singh (died 1716), Sikh general
- Bhopinder Singh (born 1946), Indian Army general
- Bikram Singh (general, born 1911) (1911–1963), Indian Army lieutenant general
- Bikram Singh (general, born 1952) (born 1952), Indian Army general
- Dalvir Singh (born 1946), Indian Army major general
- Depinder Singh (born 1930), Indian Army lieutenant general
- Hanut Singh (soldier) (1933–2015), Indian Army lieutenant general
- Harbaksh Singh (1913–1999), Indian Army lieutenant general
- Harinder Singh (general) (fl. 1980s–2020s), Indian Army lieutenant general
- Harkirat Singh (general) (fl. 1980s), Indian Army major general
- Joginder Jaswant Singh (born 1945), Indian Army general
- Kamal Jit Singh (fl. 1970s–2010s), Indian Army lieutenant general
- Kanwar Bahadur Singh (1910–2007), Indian Army lieutenant general
- Kanwar Zorawar Singh (1920–1994), Indian Army major general
- Khem Karan Singh (1921–2016), Indian Army lieutenant general
- Konsam Himalay Singh (fl. 1970s–2010s), Indian Army lieutenant general
- Kulwant Singh (general) (born 1939), Indian Army major general
- Linda L. Singh (fl. 1980s–2000s), Maryland Army National Guard major general
- Man Mohan Singh Rai (fl. 1970s–2010s), Indian Army lieutenant general
- Manjinder Singh (general) (fl. 1980s–2020s), Indian Army lieutenant general
- Mohan Singh (general) (fl. 1909–1989), Indian National Army general
- Ranbir Singh (general) (fl. 1980–2020s), Indian Army lieutenant general
- Ravendra Pal Singh (general) (fl. 1980–2020s), Indian Army lieutenant general
- S. K. Singh (general) (fl. 1970–2010s), Indian Army lieutenant general
- Sagat Singh (1919–2001), Indian Army lieutenant general
- Sardar Chuhar Singh (born c. 1743), Shaheedan Misl general
- Sartaj Singh (general) (died 1998), Indian Army lieutenant general
- Shabeg Singh (1925–1984), Indian Army major general
- Surinder Singh (general) (fl. 1970s–2010s), Indian Army lieutenant general
- Taranjit Singh (general) (fl. 1980s–2020s), Indian Army lieutenant general
- V. K. Singh (born 1951), Indian Army four-star

== See also ==
- Attorney General Singh (disambiguation)
