= ECHS =

ECHS may refer to:

== Schools ==
=== Canada ===
- Edmonton Christian High School, Edmonton, Alberta

=== United States ===
- East Catholic High School, Manchester, Connecticut
- East Central High School (disambiguation), Tulsa, Oklahoma
- East Chambers High School, Winnie, Texas
- East Coweta High School, Coweta County, Georgia
- Eastern Christian High School, North Haledon, New Jersey
- Effingham County High School, Effingham County, Georgia
- El Camino High School (disambiguation)
- El Capitan High School, Lakeside, California
- El Cerrito High School, El Cerrito, California
- Elkhart Central High School, Elkhart, Indiana
- Elyria Catholic High School, Elyria, Ohio
- Environmental Charter High School, Lawndale, California
- Escondido Charter High School, Escondido, California
- Essex Catholic High School, Newark and East Orange, New Jersey

== Other uses ==
- Early college high school, programs that allow students to obtain college credit while in high school
- ECHS1 (Enoyl Coenzyme A hydratase), a human gene
- Ex-servicemen Contributory Health Scheme (ECHS); see Military Hospital, Hisar
- Extended cylinder-head-sector) block, a translation scheme for data storage
