= Chung, India =

Chung
- Village
- Location in Punjab, India Chung (India)
- Coordinates: 31.3484°N 74.6764°E
- Country: India
- State: Punjab
- District: Tarn Taran
- Tehsil: Patti

Languages
  - Official: Punjabi
  - Other spoken: Hindi
- Time zone: UTC+5:30 (IST)
- Pin code: 143114
- Telephone code: 01852
- ISO 3166 code: IN-PB
- Vehicle registration: PB-46

Chung is a historical village in (Bhikhiwind), just 33 km from Tarn Taran Sahib in Patti tehsil of Tarn Taran district in the Indian state of Punjab. Before 1947, it was part of Kasur tehsil of Lahore district. Rice and wheat are the most cultivated crops.

== Demographics ==
Chung has been a predominantly Waraich village for three centuries. The population numbers 2,137 people, including 866 in scheduled castes, across 432 households. It has a lower literacy rate compared to Punjab as a whole. In 2011, the literacy rate of the village was 54.87% compared to 75.84% of Punjab. Male literacy stands at 60.38% and female literacy at 48.33%.

== History ==
During the Mughal period, the Mirza clan of Muslims were Mughal faujdars of the Patti area. Chung was founded by landlord Mirza Shujayat Allah Beg who partially inherited it from his in-laws and partially purchased it. Initially, its name was Fatehpur Aman Allah. At that time, Waraich Jatt was a addana malik (tenant). The village was deserted when Mughal authority ended in the area in the mid-18th century. The village remained under the Bhangi Misl until the end of eighteen century. During this time, Sardar Chuhar Singh and Rai Singh Bhangi of the village took part in the Battle of Sirhind (1764) against Mughal Governor Zain Khan Sirhindi.

During the reign of Nau Nihal Singh (1839–40), more Waraich Jatt migrated there. They changed the name of the village to Chung, as Chung is another name for the Waraich clan. Since then the village has never been deserted.

The village was electrified in 1975.

== Guru Nanak Dev University College, Chung ==
On a sprawling campus, the college occupies lush green surroundings. It was established in 2011 as a constituent college of Guru Nanak Dev University, Amritsar. The college offers degree classes in commerce and science. It operates under the new scheme of the Punjab Government with the special purpose of raising the standard of higher education, especially in the rural areas.

== Mela Pir Rodey Shah ==
Two km from the village is a tykya of Pir Rodey Shah, where an annual mela is held on every 4–5 July. A major attraction is the dangal wrestling show among the local Pehwans. Invited Punjabi folk singers perform.

== Transport ==
Two highways provide access to Chung. These roads intersect at Bhikhiwind.

== Notables ==
- Sardar Chuhar Singh.
- Sardar Rai Singh Bhangi, an eighteen-century Sikh warrior.
- Pir Baba Rodey Shah.
