= East Central =

East Central may refer to:

- EC postcode area ("East Central"), which serves most of the City of London
- East Central College, Union, Missouri
- East Central, Spokane, a neighborhood of Spokane, Washington
- East Central University, Ada, Oklahoma
- East Central Community College, Decatur, Mississippi
- East Central Community School District in Miles and Sabula, Iowa

== See also ==
- East Central High School (disambiguation)
