= Hisar Military Station =

Base headquarters of the 33rd Armoured Division of Mathura-headquartered I Corps

Hisar Military Station is an Indian Army installation located near the city of Hisar in Haryana state of India. It is the base headquarters of 33rd Armoured Division.

== History ==
It was raised on 15 November 1982 by Major General L. B. Sondhi. It was converted into a fully Armoured Division in December 1993.

== Facilities ==
=== Married Accommodation ===
Hisar Military station has 2366 married Dwelling Units (DU) of 152,200.000 Sqm carpet area for Officers, JCO’s & other ranks.

Construction started in 2006 and work was completed in four packages (Pkg-II, III, IV & V) in April, 2009 at the cost o Rs. 250 crores at 2009 price.

The scope of work comprises building work of RCC Frame structure construction (G+2 Storied), underground/overhead RCC reservoirs, Internal & External electrification, Internal & External Water supply, Road/Path/Culvers, Plumbing work, Sewage works etc. Whole project completed in 30 months period without any penalty.

After waiting over a year for the authorities to act on a complaint of alleged irregularities and corruption at the Hisar Military Station, a Colonel has petitioned the President and the Defence Ministry seeking their intervention. The Army has denied the allegations.

=== Schools ===
There are currently two schools located at the military station.

- Kendriya Vidyalaya, Military Station, Hisar provides education facilities in the cantonment area under Kendriya Vidyalaya system.
- Army Public School, Hisar was also established in 1990 within the cantonment area to provide education facilities.

=== Medical and Hospital Care ===
In 2011, a 250-bedded Military Hospital, Hisar was inaugurated to provide medical facilities. The Military Hospital in Hisar is the 111th hospital of the Army. When fully commissioned the hospital will have nine specialities. It will also have a Blood Bank, an ICU and a Physiotherapy Department.

==== Ex-servicemen Contributory Health Scheme (ECHS) for the Ex-Services & Their Families ====
In addition to Military Hospital, Hisar, Central medical Center near Dabra Chowk, NC Jindal Institute of Eye Care at Model Town and Dr. kalra's Sarvodya Multispeciality Hospital opposite Red Cross on Delhi Road in Hissar town are also on the official list of hospitals empanelled to provide the medical care to the ex-servicemen and their families under the Ex-servicemen Contributory Health Scheme (ECHS),

=== CSD Canteen ===
CSD Canteen, Hisar depot run by the Canteen Stores Department (India) is on the Delhi Road, just opposite the Police Post.

With effect from 1 January 2009, following are the new monetary limits for buying Non-AFD Items (groceries and low value items) and AFD (Against Firm Demand) Items from the CSD stores. An AFD item can be bought only on the CSD Smart Card of the original cardholder.

=== Golf Course ===
There is an 18 hole Golf Course.

=== Army Skill Training Centre (ASTC) ===
Hisar DOT Division inaugurated its Army Skill Training Centre (ASTC) on 20 October 2018 which imparts employable skills to the spouses and dependents of working army men & veterans. The ASTC runs National Skill Development Agency (NSDA)'s National Skills Qualification Framework (NSQF) recognised skill development course under the Pradhan Mantri Kaushal Vikas Yojna of Government of India. Those who successfully complete the courses will conferred Certificates as well as facilitated with placement and self employment opportunities.

== See also ==
- I Corps
- Brigade of the Guards
- Ambala Air Force Station
- Sirsa Air Force Station
- Raja Nahar Singh Faridabad Air Force Logistics Station
- List of Armed Forces Hospitals In India
- List of Indian Air Force stations
- List of Indian Navy bases
- Airports in Haryana
- Railway in Haryana
- Road Highways and Expressways in Haryana
