= Jharauli =

Jharauli Khurd
- Village
- Location in Haryana, India Jharauli Khurd (India)
- Coordinates: 30.1476°N 76.8000°E
- Country: India
- State: Haryana
- District: Kurukshetra

Population (2011)
  - Total: 1,301

Jharauli Khurd is a village located in Shahabad Markanda town of Kurukshetra district in Haryana state of India. It is about 4 km off the Grand Trunk Road.The village is surrounded by Babain Tehsil towards East, Ambala Tehsil towards North, Thanesar Tehsil towards South, Kurukshetra Tehsil towards South. According to the 2011 Census , its population was 1301 of which, 515 were a scheduled caste population. There were 241 families, of which only two were Muslim families. The area of the village is 345 hectares, with one primary school (Geeta Vidya Mandir Jhrouli Khurd est.1998), one middle school (GMS Jharauli Khurd est. 1956) and one veterinary dispensary in the village. The Literacy rate is 75.31 % which is slightly lower than that of Haryana. The village is administrated by an elected Sarpanch. Mr. Hartinder Pal Singh is the present Sarpanch of the village. Wheat, paddy and sugar cane are the main yields of the village. The village code of Jharauli Khurd is 58347.

== History ==
According to Punjab Chief, Sardar Chuhar Singh from village Chung in Patti Tehsil, Amritsar, Punjab, India received Jharauli Ilaqa as his share after winning the battle of Sirhind in 1764. Under the British protection in 1809, Jharauli was one of ten villages collectively given the status of Jagir under Chuhar Singh's descendants. Although the village is now dominated by Sikhs, there were less than ten Sikh families in Jharauli during the 1890s. Jharauli, Rania and Khari states were the center of Shaheedi Misl in Sikh period. The Muslim population of the village migrated to Pakistan in 1947. The village received electricity in 1961.
