= 62nd Cavalry (India) =

Indian Army regiment

- Active: 1957–present
- Country: India
- Allegiance: India
- Branch: Indian Army
- Type: Cavalry
- Size: Regiment
- Mottos: Hindi: धैर्य एवं शौर्य, romanized: Dhairya evm Shaurya, lit. 'Fortitude & Valour'
- Colors: Azure Blue and Canary Yellow
- Equipment: T-72

Commanders
- Colonel of the Regiment: Lieutenant General PP Singh
- Notable commanders: Brigadier Thomas Krishnan Theogaraj, MVC; Maj Gen KMKS Barach; Maj Gen Kulwant Singh, UYSM

Insignia
- Abbreviation: 62 Cav

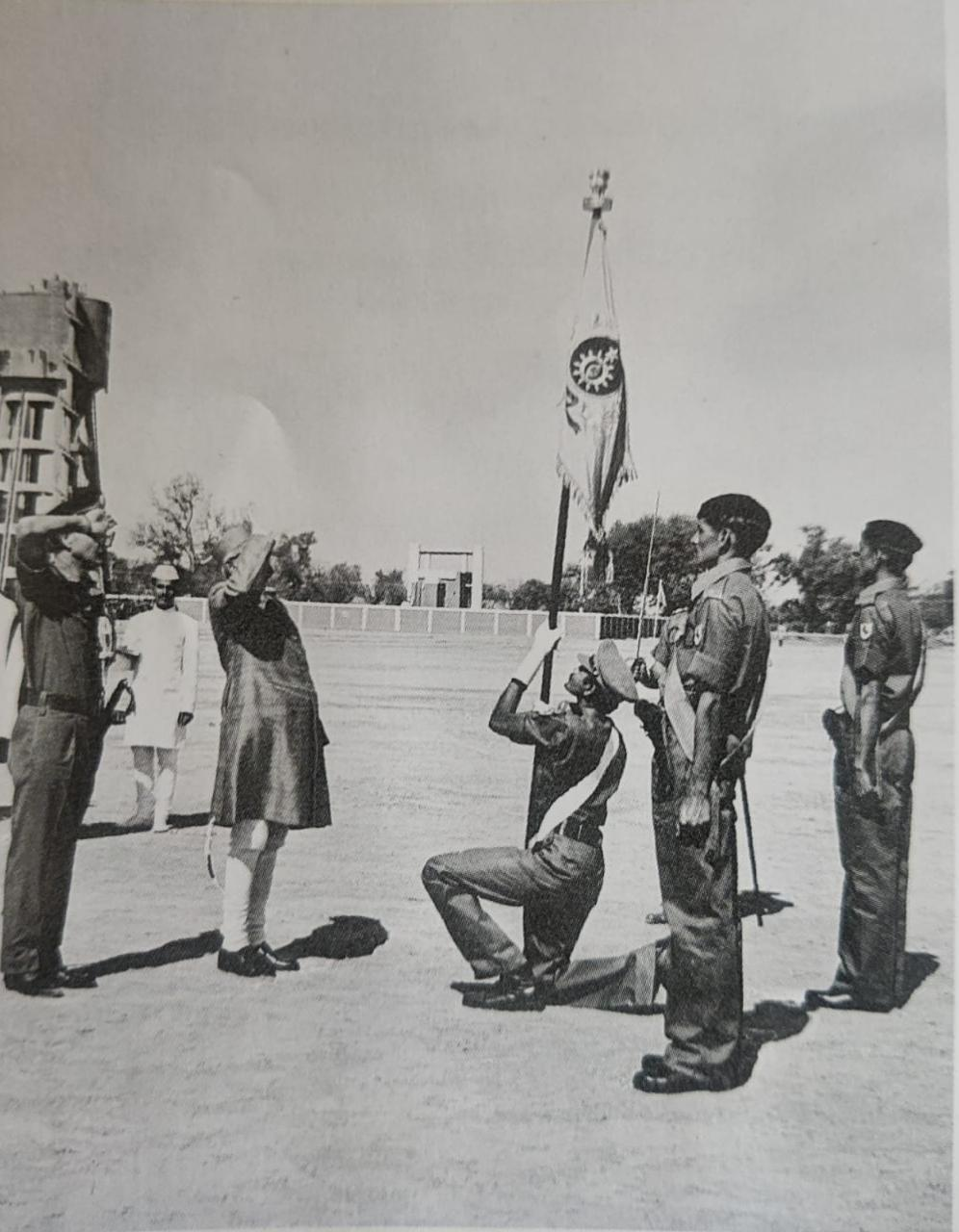
2Lt DK Tripathi receiving the Guidon on behalf of the Regiment from the President of India Shri Neelam Sanjiva Reddy on 31st Mar 1981

62 Cavalry is a pioneering component of the armoured corps of India. Its raising as the first armoured regiment of an independent nation merged the flair of Risala with the vision of an emergent army. The regiment is exemplified in an array of regimental insignia and colours that were a break from the usual pennants and lances, and reflected the efforts put into their design and conception.

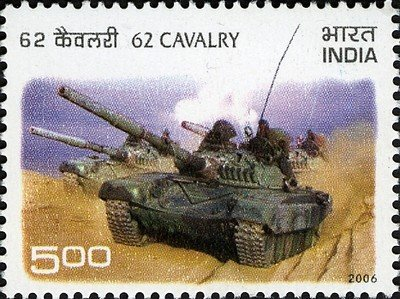
Postal stamp issued in 2006

== Formation ==
The 62nd Cavalry is an armoured regiment of the Indian Army and was raised by Lt Col RS Butalia on 31 Mar 1957 at Ambala cantonment. Drawn from the existing cavalry regiments of the time, the 62nd Cavalry was recruited from Sikh, Jat and Dogra communities.

== Indo-Pakistani War of 1965 ==
=== Introduction ===
The regiment, equipped with obsolete Sherman tanks fought modern Pakistani Patton tanks and outgunned and out-tanked them.

This is a brief account of the operations carried out by 62 Cavalry against Pakistan in Sialkot Sector from 05 to 23 September 1965. The 62 Cavalry was operationally deployed for the first-time during Operation Ablaze in April 1965. It provided the regiment an experience of preparations of war. A few exercises with troops with full strength were also conducted during May and June 1965, which came handy subsequently during operations later on.

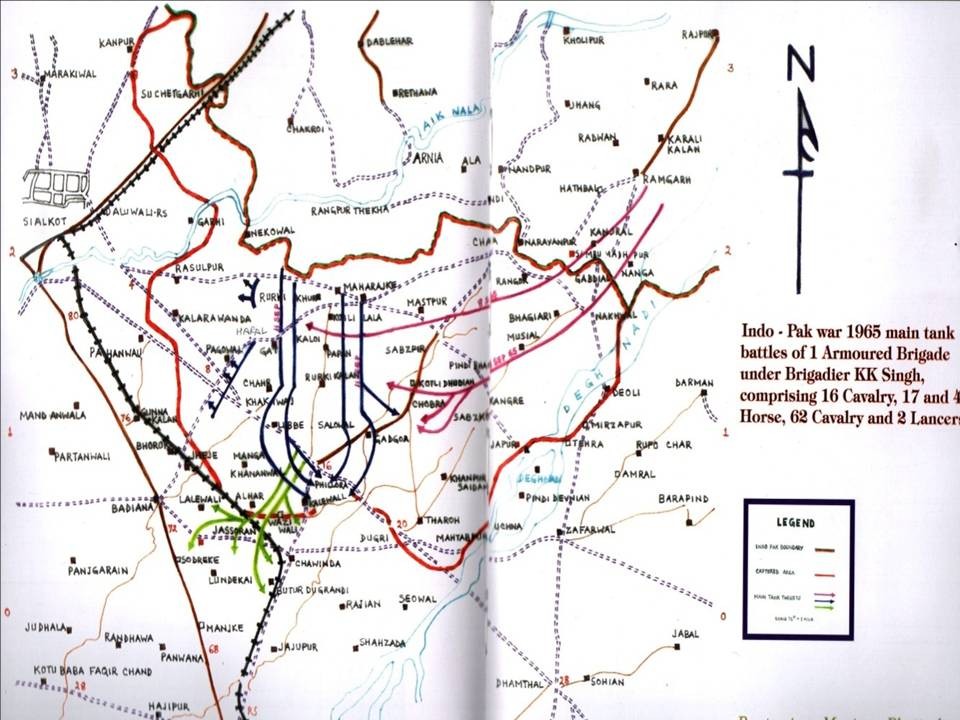
Map of 1965 War: Sialkot Sector

=== Plan of Operations ===
In early September 1965, the stage was set for operations into Pakistan and additional formations including HQ 1 Corps moved into Jammu and Kashmir. On 6 September 1965, 62 Cavalry was placed under command 6 Mountain Division for operations across Indo-Pakistan border. At an 'order' group conference held at Headquarters 6 Mountain Division, attended by the commandant, Lieutenant Colonel BM Singh the plan of attack finalised was as under:

(a) 99 Mountain Brigade with 'B' Squadron 62 Cavalry to capture Charwa.

(b) 69 Mountain Brigade with 'A' Squadron 62 Cavalry to capture Maharajke.

(c) 'C' Squadron 62 Cavalry to protect the left flank of 1 Armoured Division during its advance onto Phillora.

(d) Charwa and Maharajke to be secured by 0500 Hours on 8 September 1965.

(e) 43 Lorried Brigade Group to advance after capture of Charwa, to Koga-Likoke.

(f) 62 Cavalry less 'C' Squadron subsequently to come under command 43 Lorried Brigade at 0900 Hours on 8 September 1965 for advance to Koga – Likoke.

=== Move to Forward Concentration Area ===
The commandant at 1100 hours same day, issued final orders and action was completed by all concerned to get tanks and administrative echelons ready with full battle loads. The regiment moved from its permanent location to Chatta near Jammu at 2000 Hours on 6 September 1965 on tracks, a distance of 20 miles on indifferent roads along with hundreds of B vehicles of infantry moving to forward concentration by 2300 hours as under:

- 62 CAVALRY less 'A' Squadron in area Iron Bridge.
- 'A' Squadron in area Noria.

The following officers and JCOs moved to the concentration area –

- Regiment Headquarters: Lieutenant Colonel BM Singh, (Commandant), Major BK Mukherjee (Second-in-Command), Captain J Baskaran (Adjutant), Captain GN Yedur, AMC (Regiment Medical Officer), Lieutenant CS Brar (Intelligence Officer).
- A Squadron: Major BIS Khurana (Squadron Commander), Lieutenant Heminder Singh, Lieutenant NG Datta, Second Lieutenant PK Langar, Risaldar Mukhtiar Singh, Naib Risaldar Santokh Singh, Naib Risaldar Santokh Singh.
- B Squadron: Major KMKS Barach (Squadron Commander), Captain Kulwant Singh, Captain Achu Nair, Second Lieutenant SW Barnabas, Risaldar Fateh Singh, Naib Risaldar Sham Lal, Naib Risaldar Sultan Singh.
- C Squadron: Major SS Kirtane (Squadron Commander), Captain DPN Singh, Risaldar Lekh Raj, Risaldar Inder Singh, Naib Risaldar Prem Singh.

=== 7 September 1965 ===
On 7 September 1965, whilst in forward concentration area at about 0730 hours, four Pakistani F-86 Sabre Jets strafed and rocketed the regiment. However, due to good concealment and dispersal, it suffered no casualties. During whole of 7 September 1965, the regiment prepared itself for the attack. After the regimental order group where details of impending attacks on Charwa and Maharajke were given out, the squadron commanders attended the order groups at respective brigade headquarters and limited marrying up with infantry units was carried out. The commandant addressed all ranks and exhorted them to trust in God and carryout the assigned tasks boldly and fearlessly.

=== Battle of Charwa ===
Own guns opened up at 2300 hours on 7 September and 99 Mountain Brigade crossed SL at 2330 hours. Regiment headquarters and 'B' Squadron moved out to join 99 Mountain Brigade to provide anti-tank protection in the Charwa bridgehead. Due to difficult going a few tanks could not keep pace with leading elements; thus initially two troops of 'B' Squadron reached Charwa at 0500 hours and remainder of 'B' Squadron and regiment headquarter arrived at 0730 hours. Although the main enemy position at Charwa was captured by 0500 hours but small parties still held out in surrounding sugarcane fields. Later, 'B' Squadron with a company of 2/5 Gorkha Rifle, combed the area 2000 yards south and southwest of Charwa.

=== Battle of Maharajke ===
Maharajke, a nodal point on road Zafarwal – Sialkot put up a stiff resistance. 69 Mountain Brigade with 'A' Squadron captured it by 0530 hours in spite of heavy casualties. During early stages of battle, when communications were disrupted due to enemy action, Naib Risaldar Santokh Singh (JC-16039) carried the brigade commander in his tank to forward localities. Meanwhile, Lance Dafadar Santokh Singh (who was later killed in a tank battle near Pagowal) charged with his tank on enemy RCL gun which was engaging tanks and overran it.

=== Advance from Charwa ===
At about 1500 hours on 8 September 1965, Commander 43 Lorried Infantry Brigade ordered the regiment headquarter and 'B' Squadron to resume their advance from Charwa and clear the area between Charwa and Maharajke. Small pockets of Pakistani fighters still held at Khanor and Sangial, and fired automatic weapons on tank commanders who were moving with hatches open. Near Sangial, a party of armed mujahids firing from high ground was effectively engaged by Commandant and Adjutant (Captain J Bhaskaran) themselves taking a shoot. At about 1730 hours 4 Pakistani F-86 Sabre Jets strafed and rocketed the column and at 1830 Hours it reached Maharajke. A1 & A2 echelons joined the Regiment at Maharajke. While in harbour, the regiment at night was fired upon by enemy small parties using MMGs.

=== 9 and 10 September 1965 ===
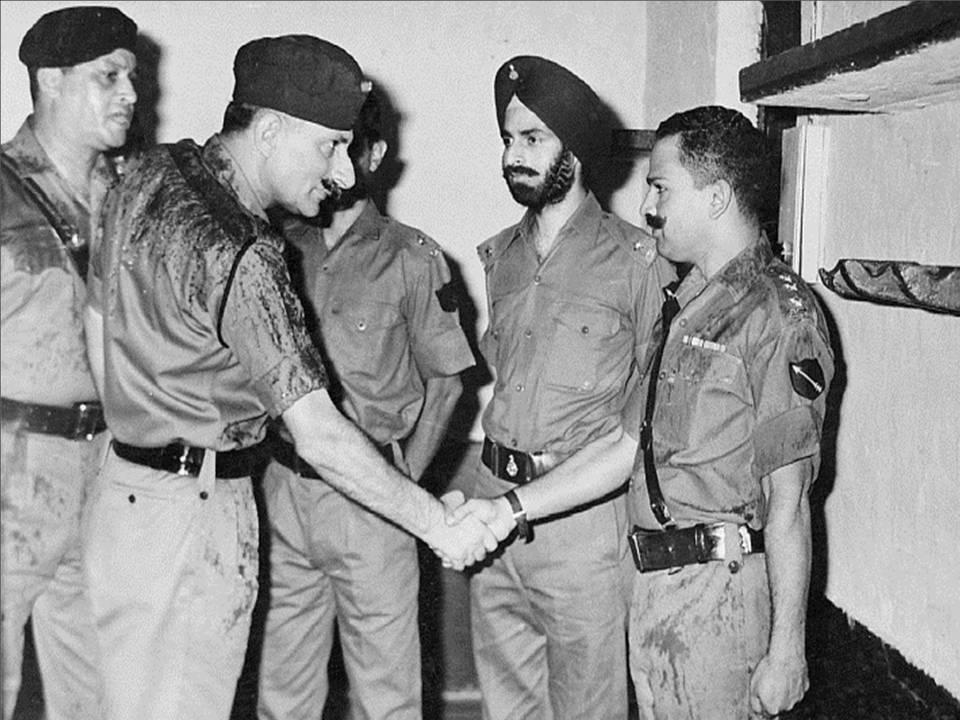
COAS(later Field Marshal) SHFJ Manekshaw visiting the Regiment in Sep 1969

=== Capture of Kaloi ===
Due to bad going, advance of 43 Lorried Brigade had been slowed down and it completed concentration in Maharajke during night 8/9 September 1965. At an order group held at headquarters 43 Lorried Brigade at 2330 Hours, the regiment was ordered to advance next morning and secure Pagowal. Following additional troops were placed under command:

Under Command – 8 Garhwal Rifles

Indirect Support – R Battery 101 Field Regiment (SP)

At 0915 hours advance commenced and 'A' Squadron secured first bound Parashayan. Thereafter, the advance continued with 'B' Squadron leading and area Kaloi was secured by 1400 hours after brushing aside minor opposition in the villages. At about 1445 Hours, Commander 43 Lorried Brigade ordered the regiment to firm in area Kaloi. 43 Lorried Brigade occupied a defended sector in area Kaloi–Rurki Khurd and the regiment was deployed to provide anti-tank defense to the brigade defended Sector. At about 1100 hours on 10 September 1965, Pakistani fighters brought down a heavy concentration of medium artillery fire on the defended sector and No 1034723 Sowar Sher Singh became the first battle casualty.

=== Battle of Haral ===
Task

On 11 September 1965, 62 Cavalry, less 'C' Squadron, was located at Kaloi. At a briefing by the commandant; general officer commanding, 1 Armoured Division, tasked the regiment "To secure the important area crossroads, so as to protect the western area flank of 1 Armoured Brigade attack on Phillora".

Enemy Dispositions

Intelligence sources believed that little, if any, Pakistani armour was in the area Pagowal – Wadianwala. It was felt, that they had either already moved their armour further east to block the advance of 1 Armoured Brigade onto Phillora or were holding it in reserve for defense of Sialkot.

Advance to Cross-Roads

The regiment advanced at 0930 Hours from Kaloi along track Kaloi – Haral – Pagowal crossroads. The village Haral was secured by 1110 hours. As leading troops advanced further skirting village Pagowal, about 1500 yards from the objective, Pakistani Patton tanks located in a grove near Pagowal opened fire on the leading tanks. The leading squadron was ordered to deploy in the area Lone Tree – Haral to engage enemy armour frontally. The other squadron was to move up West of Haral, to take on enemy armour from that flank. Two troops of Patton tanks located in the grove were engaged and soon after were hit and set on fire. The remainder pulled back behind village Pagowal. The squadron was to keep edging forward towards cross roads, but ensuring that two troops, constantly kept a watch on enemy armour which was still in that area. Meanwhile, Pakistani artillery observation posts apparently located on top of houses in village Pagowal, which in itself was on a rise, brought down intense medium artillery fire on the leading troops of both squadrons, which were in their full view and further advance was held up.

Enemy Counter Attack

Soon after a big cloud of dust was seen approaching Pagowal from the southwest. It appeared enemy was fast moving armour reinforcements from Wadianwala-Chak Lwaranda to block further advance. The Pakistani reaction to the regiment's advance to area Pagowal was because it was the deepest thrust made till then towards Sialkot; and moreover threatened to cut off their forces still fighting in Phillora. Thereafter, two squadrons of Pakistani Patton tanks supported by heavy artillery fire made an aggressive thrust to envelop the regiment around village Haral. When this thrust was held, enemy developed two parallel thrusts with a squadron each moving to the west and east of Haral aimed at cutting off communications with Brigade Defended Sector at Kaloi or possibly to drive a deep wedge towards Maharajke which then was then lightly undefended. Both the regiment's flanks were vulnerable; 168 Brigade was still at Bajragarhi and 1 Armoured Brigade was fighting in area Libbe – Phillora.

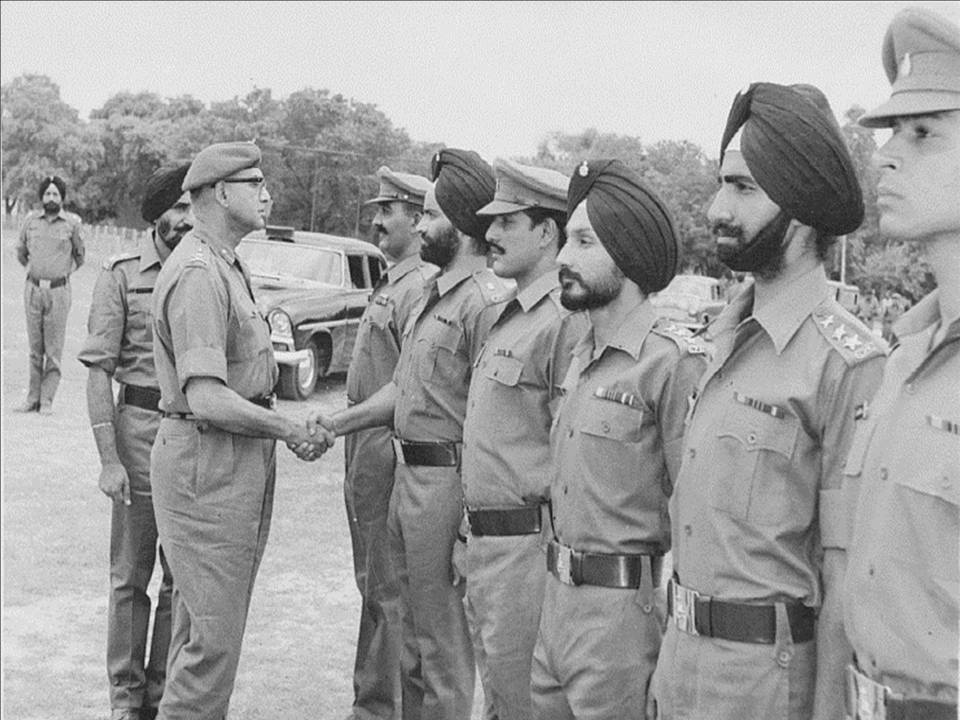
Gen GB Bewoor visiting the Regiment in Feb 1974

Own Plan The Commandant quickly evolved a plan, which called for holding a number of layback positions and time till each one was to be denied to the enemy. Due to the Pakistani's qualitative superiority in armour, it was vital that one squadron should hold the enemy to gain time for second squadron to move to the next layback position and settle before contact; as in a running fight Sherman tanks would likely have fared badly against Pattons. The regiment headquarter remained with each squadron as it held layback position, from where it could watch the progress of the Pakistani outflanking moves, and thus was able to control and direct the early move of troops to thwart their aim. By late afternoon, the fighting had lasted over six hours and though three Patton tanks had been knocked out and several more damaged, five Sherman tanks on the Indian side had been destroyed. Further, the tanks had almost exhausted their ammunition. However, by then, on the Commandant's incessant requests to General Officer Commanding, 1 Armoured Division, a medium artillery regiment was allocated for support and this greatly helped slow down the Pakistani enemy advance. Meanwhile officers and men collected ammunition from A1 echelon and fed it to leading tanks in open jeeps, at times under enemy artillery fire. Finally, the Pakistani armour was halted on line Ring Contour – Ghaon – Grave Yard and the Regiment held area Kaloi – Chak Ali to block their passage to Maharajke or its interference with Brigade Defended Sector at Kaloi. 1 Armoured Division account of operations for 11 September 1965 reads:-

"62 Cavalry less one squadron with 8 Garhwal Rifles were ordered to establish themselves in area GAT to ensure that no enemy armour broke through our Right flank from Sialkot side. At about 1530 hours, the enemy launched a furious attack with a regiment of Patton tanks directed against our right flank troops established in GAT. The enemy's intention was to cut off our rear, a sensitive spot in so far as it affected the overall day's battle". Even though the crossroads was not captured, by drawing away and fighting to a standstill a major enemy armour force throughout that day, the overall aim was fully achieved, as it helped to safeguard West flank of 1 Armoured Brigade which captured Phillora at 1600 hours, on 11 September 1965. After Pagowal was captured on 13 September 1965 by 69 Mountain Brigade and 62 Cavalry, the sight of a large number of tank tracks in Wadianwala – Chak Lwaranda area confirmed the earlier estimate that on 11 September 1965 almost a Patton regiment had fought against 62 Cavalry. This tank battle was the climax of the battle till then which resulted in knocking out of three Patton tanks, two of which remained on the ground near Pagowal till 24 February 1966.

== Indo-Pakistani War of 1971 ==
The regiment with their T-55 tanks were part of Mike force under XI Corps. Mike Force with its Headquarter at Abohar was a reserve held by Western Command and consisted of 62 Cavalry (T-55), 18 Cavalry less B Squadron (T-54), one Mechanised Infantry Company and a medium artillery regiment.

== Other operations ==
It has participated in Operation Trident, Operation Vijay and Operation Parakram.

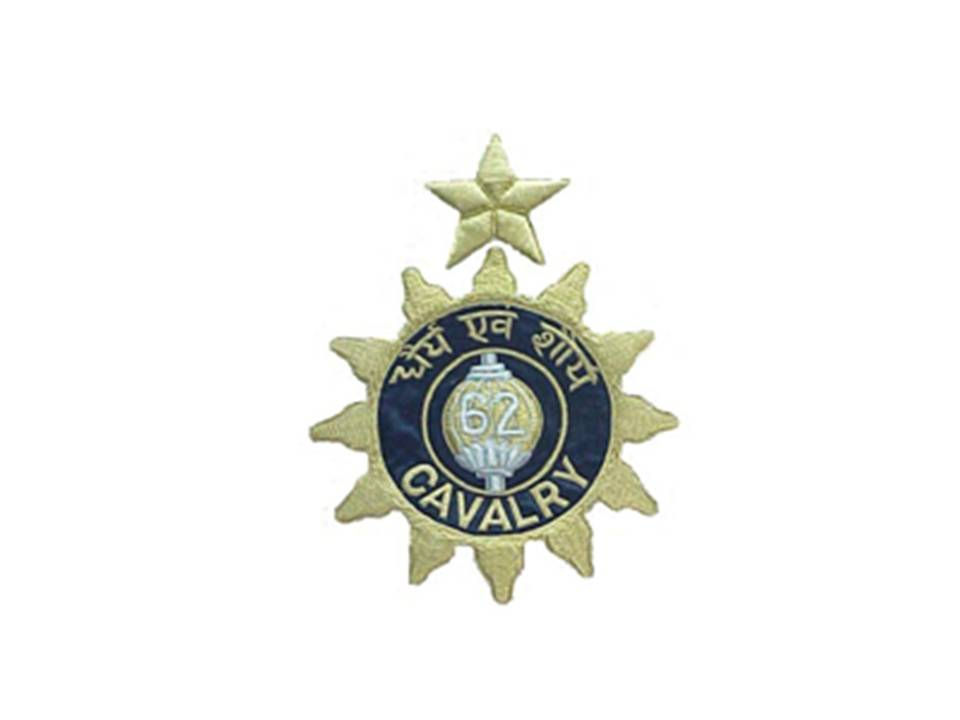
62 CAVALRY Crest

== President's colours ==
The regiment was honoured by President Neelam Sanjiva Reddy during its silver jubilee when he presented a Guidon to them at Ambala on 31 March 1981.

Chief of the Army Staff General J. J. Singh presented a new 'President's Standard to the 62nd Cavalry on 31 March 2006 at Dehra Dun.

== Equipment ==
Though the regiment was initially raised on Churchill tanks, by the time the country had to face Pakistan in 1965, it was armed with Sherman tanks. The regiment used the T-55 tanks during the Indo-Pakistani War of 1971. It is presently equipped with the T-72 tanks.

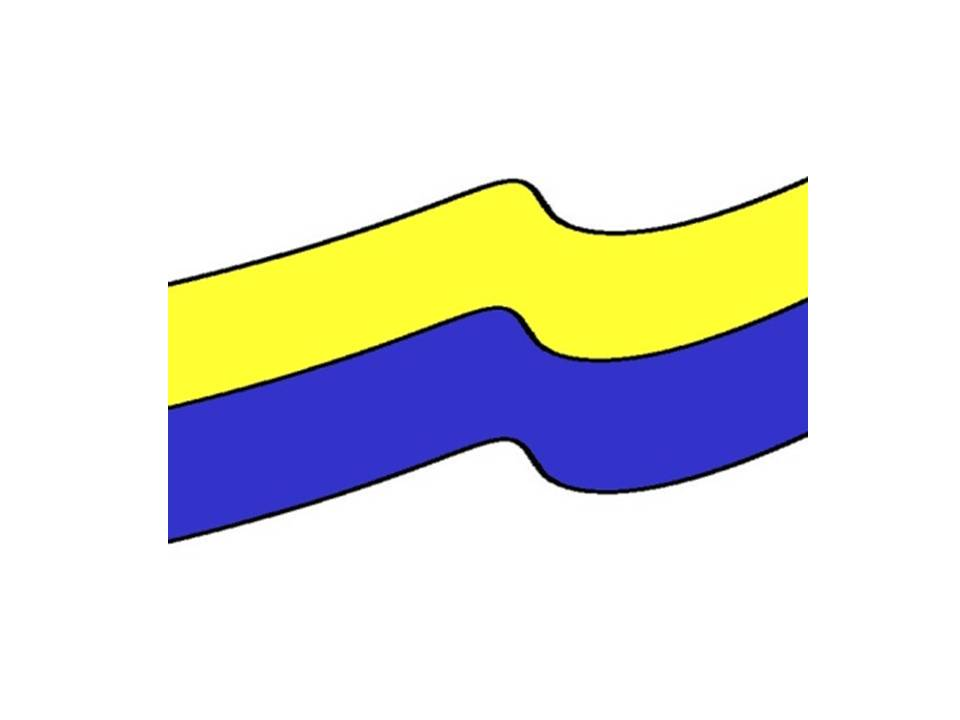
Regiment Colours of 62 Cavalry

== Regimental insignia ==
Regimental Crest: The five pointed star is the symbol of the Lord creator, in the sense that it represents the five basic elements of creation: earth, air, fire, water and ether. The twelve pointed chakra may be linked to the symbol of Lord Krishna's Sudarshan Chakra. It can also be taken as a twelve pointed lotus, the symbol of Lord Shiva in his benign form. Both the forms are very dear to the Jats and the Dogras. The inner chakra symbolizes the guru's grace in battle, so near and dear to the Sikhs, whereas, the five pointed star, twelve pointed Chakra and the plain Chakra all symbolize faith in god and his protection to the wearer of the badge. The mace-head symbolizes the Yama or Kal (Pran Nath) or Shiva as the destroyer of the enemy and evil. In its modern connotation the badge consists of a sprocket, conveying mobility in battle, and a mace-head that represents the destruction of the enemy through firepower.

Regiment Colours: The colours of the regiment are Azure Blue and Canary Yellow. The yellow signifies the divine light (Jyoti) and blue stands for purity of action (or mind) a colour that is dear to both Lord Krishna and Guru Gobind Singh. It is also the colour of Vayu and of Lord Shiva.

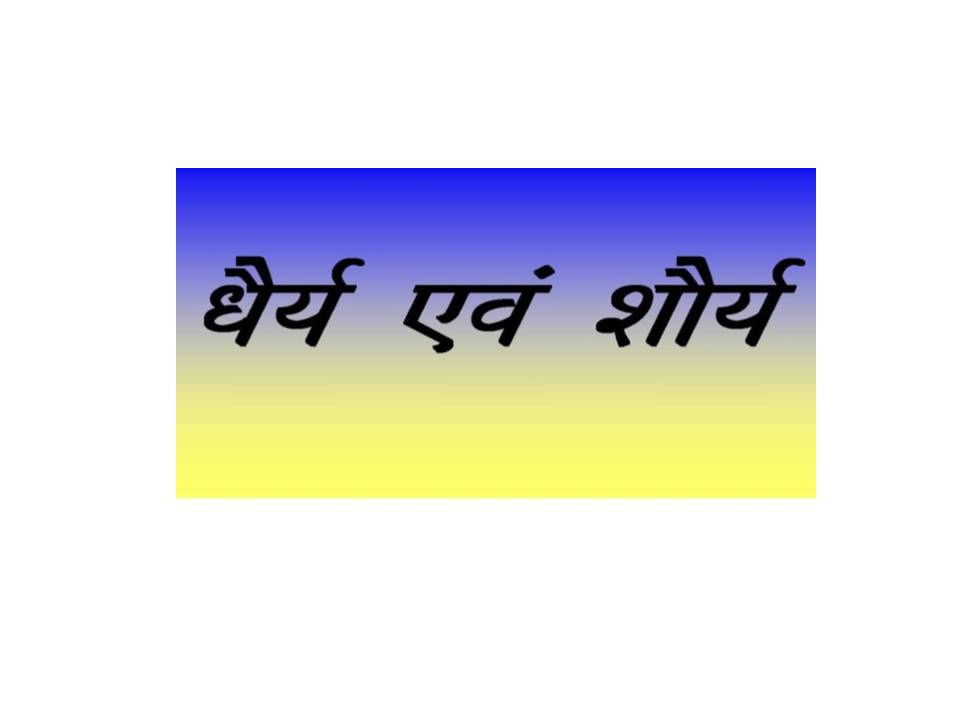
Regiment Motto

Regimental Motto: After research on Regimental Crest and colours, the regiment motto was selected. It was a follow-up to the sentiments behind the crest and the colours. The founders of the regiment selected धैर्य एवं शौर्य (Dhairya evm Shaurya) as the motto which signifies 'With Faith in God, Fight with Valour' or 'Fortitude & Valour'. Thus the interpretation is 'having surrendered to the will of god, fight with courage'. Lieutenant Colonel RS Butalia, first Commandant of the Regiment, played an instrumental role in selection of the motto, which reflects the blend of military and religious convictions, thus reinforcing the belief that victory has always been the privilege of the brave and the righteous.

== List of firsts about 62 Cavalry ==
- First Armoured Regiment to be raised entirely on tanks – July 1956
- First Armoured Regiment to be raised post-independence – June 1956
- First Regiment to innovate navigation on gyro – April 1977
- First CG (MIKE Force) of Indian Army – December 1971
- First T-72 Regiment to be inducted across River Chenab – 2011
- First Regiment to take T-72 on Zoji La top and across to Leh – 2011
- First Regiment to fire utilising Cdr's TI sight – 2019
