= Flirting with Fate =

Flirting with Fate may refer to:

- Flirting with Fate (1916 film), a 1916 American film
- Flirting with Fate (1938 film), a 1938 American comedy film
- Flirting with Fate (novel), a 2012 novel
