= Kendriya Vidyalaya, Military Station, Hisar =

Location
- Hisar Military Station, Haryana, India; 29°09′N 75°42′E

Information
- School type: Public funded
- School district: Hisar
- Principal: Mr. Satyaveer singh
- Gender: Co-educational
- Age: 3 to 18
- Website: www.kvhisarcantt.org

Kendriya Vidyalaya, Hisar is a govt school located in Hisar Military Station at Hisar in the Indian state of Haryana.

== Details ==
The school has 38 classrooms, 10 labs, 1 library and other facilities.

== Academics ==
The schools offer classes till and also classes 1st10+2.

== See also ==
- List of Universities and Colleges in Hisar
- List of schools in Hisar
- List of institutions of higher education in Haryana
