= Attorney General Singh =

Attorney General Singh may refer to:

- Vijay R. Singh (1931–2006), KBE (1931–2006) Attorney General of Fiji
- Anand Singh (Fijian politician) (born 1948), Attorney General of Fiji
- Doodnauth Singh (1933–2013), Attorney General of Guyana

== See also ==
- General Singh (disambiguation)
