= El Camino High School =

El Camino High School may refer to the following schools in California, United States:

- El Camino High School (Norwalk) in Norwalk
- El Camino High School (Oceanside, California)
- El Camino High School (Rohnert Park) in Rohnert Park
- El Camino High School (Salinas) in Salinas
- El Camino High School (South San Francisco) in South San Francisco
- El Camino High School (Ventura) in Ventura
- El Camino High School (Whittier) in Whittier

It may also refer to:

- El Camino Fundamental High School in Sacramento
- El Camino Real Senior High School in Woodland Hills, Los Angeles
- El Camino Real High School (Placentia) in Placentia
