= Sardar Chuhar Singh =

- Born: Sardar Chuhar Singh circa 1743; Chung 31.3052°N 74.6506°E
- Resting place: Punjab
- Years active: 1764–
- Known for: fought in Battle of Sirhind (1764)
- Successor: Mahar Singh
- Children: Karam Singh, Mahar Singh

Sardar Chuhar Singh (born c. 1743) of Jharauli was a general of Shaheedan Misl. He was the paternal cousin of Rai Singh Bhangi and close relative of Sikh warrior Baba Deep Singh. Under the command of Jassa Singh Ahluwalia, he fought for Shaheedan Misl in the Battle of Sirhind (1764) against Mughal Faujdar of Sirhind, Zain Khan Sirhindi. He secured Jharauli, Fatehgarh Atri, Ajrana and seven other villages by Markanda River. He had two sons, Karam Singh (died 1808) and Mohar Singh (died 1845). The younger son, Mohar Singh, took charge of the Jharauli estate. His elder son Karam Singh took control of the family estate at Chung that was finally incorporated to Lahore Darbar by issueless Ranjit Singh after his death in 1808. Mohar Singh lost seven villages of the Jharauli estate to Bhunga Singh of Thanesar in 1780. The Jharauli estate remained under the Court of Wards during 1885-1893 and again between 1922-1947.

== Early life ==
Sardar Chuhar Singh came from the village Chung, situated about 45 km south of Amritsar. He was born into the Waraich clan of Sindhu Jats, around 1743. The village was named Chung after the Waraich Jats who settled there in the time of Addana Maliks (tenants).

== Warrior ==
Motivated by Baba Deep Singh's teachings, he joined the Shaheedan Misl, led by Misl Karam Singh Shahid, grandson of Baba Deep Singh. At that time, the Sikhs of Mahja and Malwa were determined to conquer the Muslim province of Sirhind. Hence the seven Sikh Misls, including the Shaheedan Misl from this area, were united under the leadership of Jassa Singh Ahluwalia.

=== Fall of Sirhind, 14 January 1764 ===
The total strength of the Sikh army, Dal Khalsa, was 50,000.The Sikhs lay encamped in three divisions. The six misls of Budha Dal under Jassa Singh Ahluwalia were stationed at Bhaganpur, while other five misls, Trauna Dal, were at Punja and the Phulkian misl was at Patiala. Zain Khan was informed of this situation and determined to take advantage of their scattered forces. One night he attacked Trauna Dal at village Pir Zain Khan Munayra, seven miles east of Sirhind. The Sikhs had decided the prior night to make a united attack on Sirhind. The news of Zain Khan’s attack was immediately conveyed to the other two bodies and in a short time they surrounded Zain Khan on all sides. Zain Khan was forced to fight and found himself unable to cope with the situation. He maintained his position at night and in the early hours of the morning began to send his detachments with guns, swivels and matchlocks with a view to divert the attention of Sikhs away from himself, so that he might escape. He was partially successful, because the Tranuna Dal actually fell upon the baggage and busied themselves in plunder. But the Budha Dal under Jasa Singh Ahluwalia besieged him after he had gone only a little further. Zain Khan evaded his besiegers again, but he was eventually shot dead. His Afghan troops fled in a state of panic, but they were hotly pursued and cut to pieces. A vast tract of Sirhind, 220 miles longs and 160 miles wide, was taken by the Sikhs. This vast illaka was divided among the Sardars. From his share, Chuhar Singh retained ten villages for himself and gave the rest to his lieutenants.

== Later years ==
After appointing his sons at Jharauli and Chung, he returned to Amritsar and was in charge of Gurdwara Shahid Bunga Baba Dip Singh for a long period of time. According to an other source Sahifa-e-Zarrin 1902. 23 October 2023., he settled in Lahore or Gujranwala, where he won fifteen to twenty villages with power of his sword and was accounted as one of the most powerful Sardars of his time. He was killed in a battle with Ranjit Singh and his land was confiscated by him. The descendants of Chuhar Singh now live in Jharauli, Chandigarh and London.
