= 33rd Armoured Division =

Part of I Corps "Strike Corp" of Indian Army

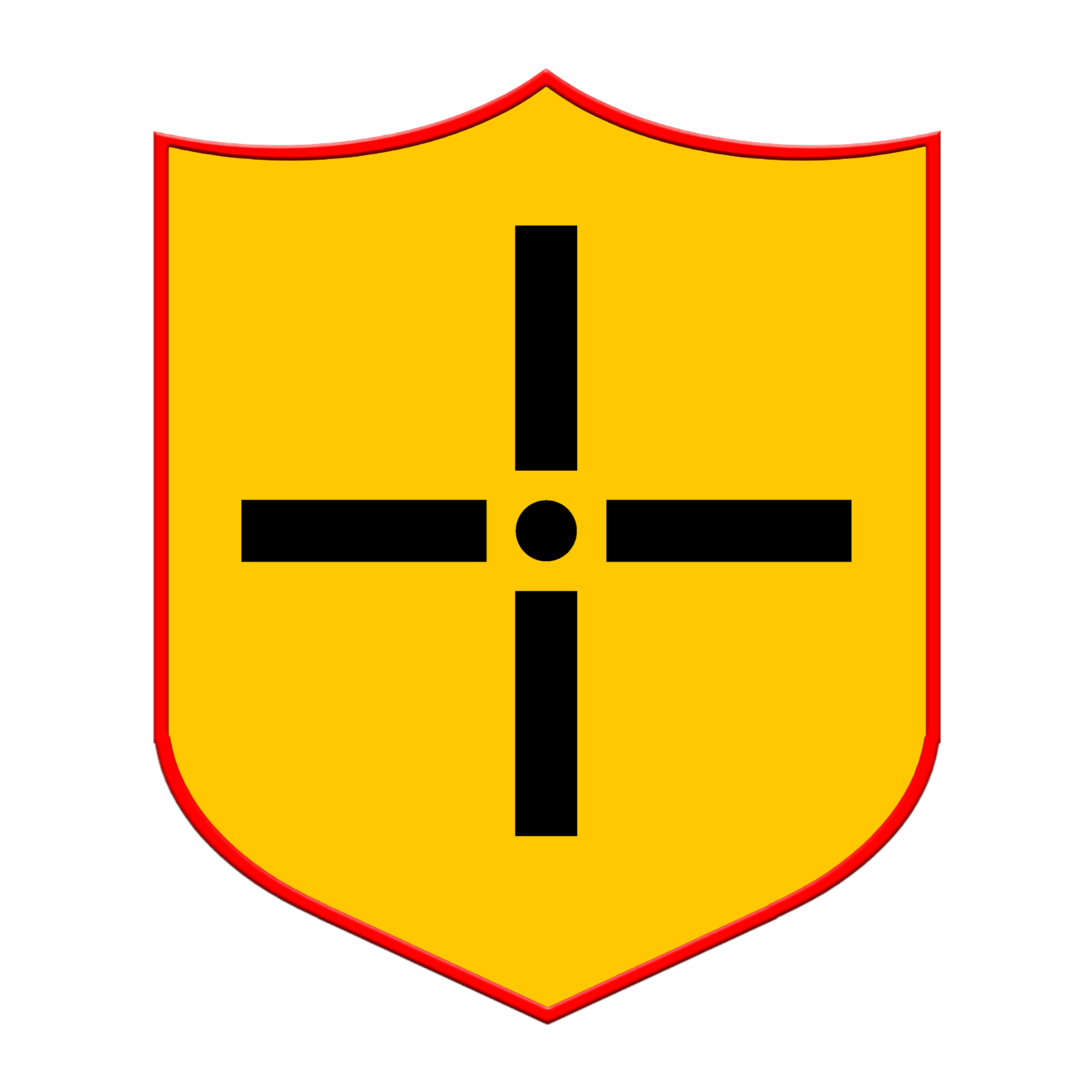
- Formation Badge of the 33rd Armoured Division
- Founded: 15 November 1982 – present
- Country: India
- Branch: Indian Army
- Type: Armoured
- Size: Division
- Part of: I Corps
- Garrison/HQ: Jaipur

The 33rd Armoured Division, based at Hisar Military Station, is part of I Corps "Strike Corps" of Indian Army. I Corps is a battle formation under South Western Command headquartered at Jaipur.

Indian armoured regiment, the 1 Horse (Skinner's Horse) raised by James Skinner at Hansi in 1803 is based at Hissar.

== History ==
=== Formation ===
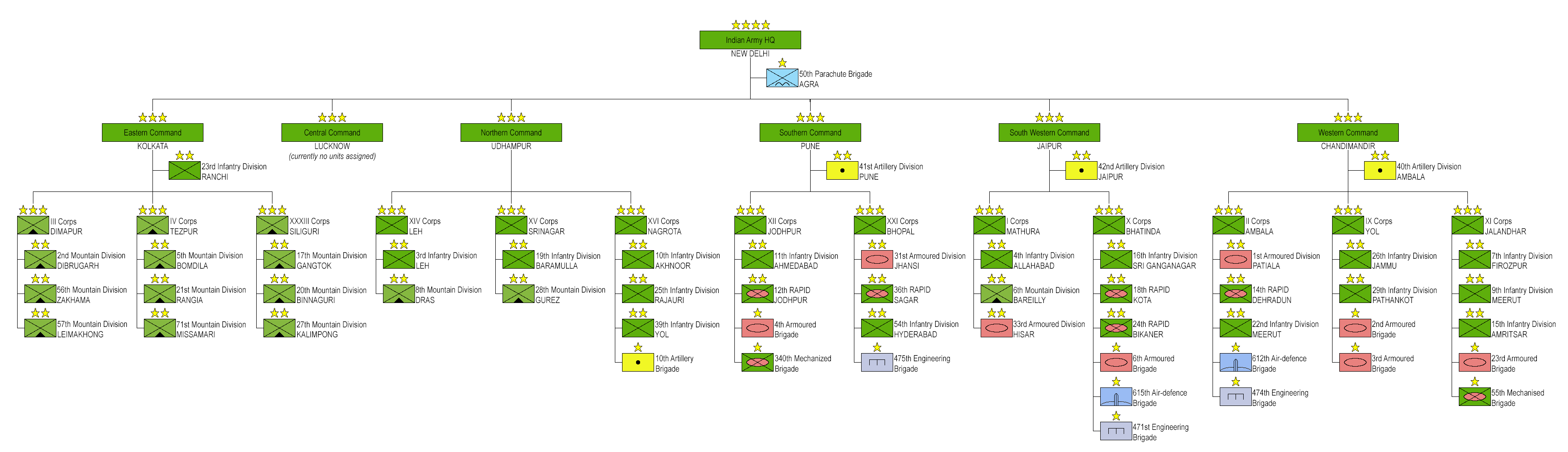
Indian Army Structure

33rd Armoured Division was raised on 15 November 1982 by Major General L. B. Sondhi. It was converted into an Armoured Division in December 1993.

=== Arjun Tank Trial ===
Phase II of Arjun Tank was conducted at Hisar, Haryana and check was made for medium fording capability.

== Component units ==
=== Command: South Western Command (Jaipur) ===
The 33rd Armoured Division is part of I Corps under South Western Command of Indian Army.

- I Corps, headquartered at Mathura, Uttar Pradesh, consists of the following 3 army divisions:
  - the 4th Infantry Division (Allahabad, Uttar Pradesh) also called Red Eagle
  - the 23rd Infantry Division(Ranchi, Jharkhand) also called Cockerel
  - the 33rd Armoured Division (Hisar Military Station, Haryana)
- the X Corps headquartered at Bathinda, Punjab consists of
  - the 16th Infantry Division (Sudarshan) (Ganganagar, Rajasthan)
  - the 18th RAPID (Kota, Rajasthan)
  - the 24th RAPID (Bikaner, Rajasthan).
  - the 6th Independent Armoured Brigade, SAND VIPER BRIGADE (Suratgarh, Rajasthan).

=== Corps: I Corps (Mathura) ===
The I Corps strike corps of the South Western Command, created in 1965 and headquartered at Mathura, consists of the following 3 army divisions:

- the 4th Infantry Division (Allahabad), Uttar Pradesh), also called "Red Eagle"
- the 23rd Infantry Division (Ranchi), Jharkhand, also called "Cockerel"
- the 33rd Armoured Division (Hisar Military Station, Haryana)

=== Division: 33rd Armoured Division (Hisar) ===
The 33rd Armoured Division has 5 Brigades (3 Armoured, 1 Artillery & 1 Air Defence brigades).

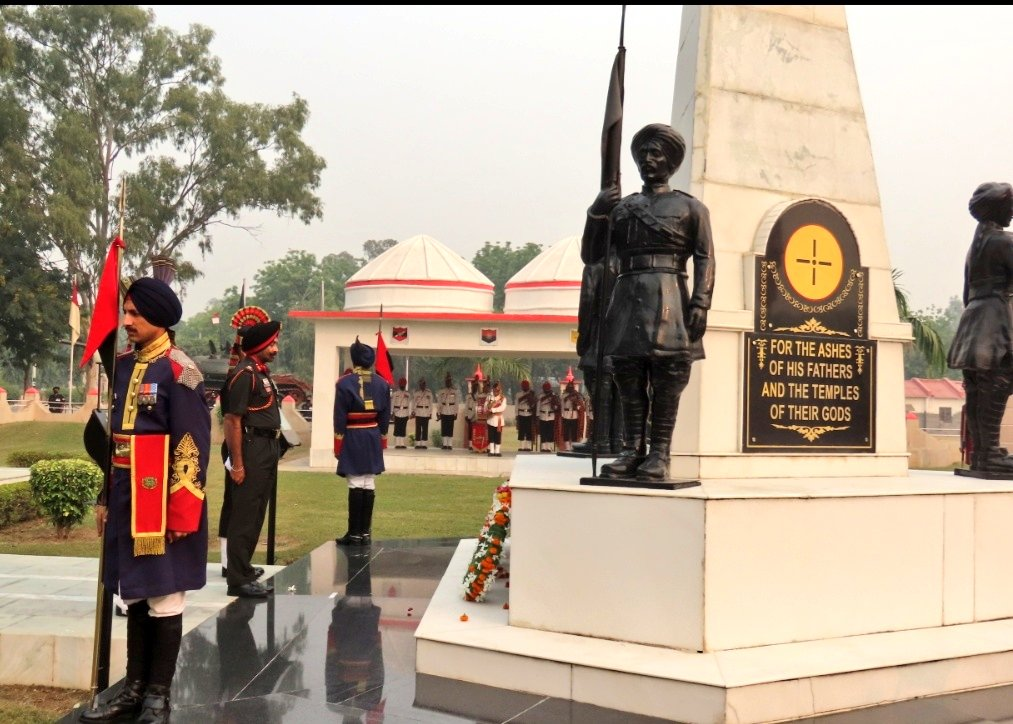
33 Armoured (Dot on target) Division - War Memorial, Hisar Military Station.

=== Brigade: 5 Brigades of the 33rd Armoured Division ===
A Regiment is a homogenous unit from one of the combat arms, like Armoured (tank), Mechanised (vehicles) or Artillery. A Brigade is multi-functional unit composed of different types of Battalions or Regiments.

The '33rd Armoured Division' has total 5 Brigades:

- the 39th Armoured Brigade (formerly '39th Mechanised Brigade')
- the 57th Armoured Brigade (formerly '57th Mechanised Brigade')
- the 88th Armoured Brigade (formerly '88th Mechanised Brigade')
- the 627th (Independent) Armoured Air Defence Brigade (formerly '627th (Independent) Mechanised Air Defence Brigade')
- the 33rd Artillery Brigade

It initially consisted of the 88 Mechanised Brigade (was already in existence), the 39 Mechanised Brigade and the 33 Artillery Brigade were also raised on 15 November 1982. The 57 Mechanised Brigade was raised on 1 March 1983. The 627th (Independent) Mechanised Air Defence Brigade became part of the Division's Orbat (Order of battle) on 1 December 1989. Later, all Mechanised Brigades were converted to the Armoured Brigades.

=== Battalion ===
- Each of the three Armoured Brigades (39, 57 & 88 Armoured Brigades) in the 33rd Armoured Division comprise
  - Two Armoured Regiments (equipped with T-72 or T-90). This includes the historical 1 Horse Armoured Regiment (Skinner's Horse) raised by James Skinner at Hansi in 1803.
  - 2 Mechanised Battalions (equipped with BMP-2).
- the 33rd Artillery Brigade comprises three regiments:
  - 1 × Towed artillery Regiment (e.g. Howitzer),
  - 1 × Self propelled artillery Regiment
  - 1 × LT AD (Light Air Defence) artillery and was located at Faridkot & Ferozpur.

== Notable Soldiers ==
- late Maj. Gen. L.B.S. Sondhi - founder of 33rd Armoured Division

== See also ==
- Mechanised Infantry Regiment
- Order of battle
