= Preeti Singh =

Indian author (born 1971)

- Preeti Singh
- Born: 26 October 1971 (age 54); Ambala
- Occupation: Author
- Children: 1
- Parent: Kulwant Singh
- Writing career
- Language: English
- Genre: Thriller fiction
- Notable works: Flirting with Fate (2012); Crossroads (2014); Watched (2016); Of Epilepsy Butterflies (2020)

Preeti Singh (born 26 October 1971) is an Indian author based in Chandigarh, known for writing thriller fiction. She is the author of the novels Flirting with Fate (2012), Crossroads (2014), and Watched (2016). Her fourth book, Of Epilepsy Butterflies (2020), deals with the experiences of people living with epilepsy. Singh began her career as an editor and content writer before publishing her debut novel in 2012.

== Early life and education ==
Singh was raised in an army family. Her father, Kulwant Singh, was a Major General in the Indian Army. She completed her schooling at La Martiniere Lucknow and graduated in English from MCM DAV College for Women, Chandigarh. She later obtained a master's degree in English literature from Panjab University, a postgraduate diploma in journalism and mass communication from Indira Gandhi National Open University, and a Bachelor of Education degree from Annamalai University.

== Career ==
Singh worked as a freelance writer before publishing her debut novel, Flirting with Fate, in 2012. The crime thriller is set in Shimla during the 1980s, and Singh spent five years writing it. Some of its characters were based on people she had encountered in her life.

She followed it with Crossroads, a contemporary fiction novel published in 2014. The novel explores domestic violence, abuse and the choices faced by a woman in a troubled marriage, and features characters based on real-life individuals.

Her third book, Watched, was published in October 2016 and is a crime thriller centred on an investigation into a series of murders.

In 2020, she published Of Epilepsy Butterflies, a work of non-fiction containing the stories of eight people living with epilepsy, including Singh. The book deals with the social stigma associated with epilepsy.

=== Television ===
In September 2026, Singh made her television acting debut in the StarPlus series Sayoneee, playing Mrs. Sethi in a cameo role. The series stars Rashami Desai, Janhavi Soni and Gautam Singh Vig in lead roles, and Singh filmed her scenes in her hometown of Chandigarh.

== Bibliograophy ==
- Flirting with Fate. Mahaveer Publishers. 2012. ISBN 9788183520324.
- Crossroads: It's About Time. Authors Press. 2014. ISBN 9789382647157.
- Watched... Don't Say a Word. Omji Publishing House. 2016. ISBN 9789384028831.
- Of Epilepsy Butterflies: Flying Beyond Stigmas. Vitasta Publishing. 2020. ISBN 9788194820048.

== Advocacy and social work ==
Singh has lived with epilepsy since early childhood and was diagnosed with the condition at the age of two. She has worked to raise awareness about epilepsy. In 2020, she published Of Epilepsy Butterflies: Flying Beyond Stigmas, an anthology of testimonies, fictional stories and poems concerning the experiences of people affected by epilepsy, which she said was intended to encourage open discussion of the condition and challenge misconceptions surrounding it.

In March 2022, Singh unveiled her book at Fortis Hospital in Mohali to raise awareness of epilepsy. She had a helpline and an email contact for counselling people with epilepsy, and ran a Facebook page called "Epilepsy Champs of Chandigarh".

In November 2023, Singh delivered a TEDx talk on epilepsy at the Indian Institute of Technology Bombay. She became the first individual from India to deliver a TEDx talk on the subject.

In 2015, she volunteered with Helping Souls, which was a Panchkula-based NGO that worked on animal welfare and initiatives supporting women and children in slum communities.

== Personal life ==
She resides in Chandigarh with her family and has a daughter, Harsheen Kaur Manaise.

In 2019, she spoke to The Tribune about her adopted Cocker Spaniel, Sizzler Singh, who she said could alert her before some seizures.

== Awards and recognition ==
In 2011, Singh was featured in the Coffee Table Book of Leading Personalities of Chandigarh. Her debut novel, Flirting with Fate, was nominated for the Commonwealth Bookers Prize in 2012 and received the Best Debut Crime Fiction of 2012 award from Butterfly & Bee.

Her book Crossroads – It's About Time was listed by the India Book of Records in 2015 as the first Indian fiction novel based on real-life characters using their real names.

She received the Swayamsiddha Award in the Self-made man category from the Anupama Foundation in Lucknow in 2015, followed by the Best Author Award at the Sanmati Literary Awards for her novel Crossroads in 2016. In 2017, she was awarded the Bharat Nirman Literary Excellence Award at the 5th Asiad Literature Festival in Chandigarh. Her non-fiction book, Of Epilepsy Butterflies, was later named the best non-fiction work of 2021 by the A3 Foundation for Literary Awards.

== See also ==
- List of Indian writers
