= Ranbir Singh (general) =

Indian Army general

Lieutenant General Ranbir Singh PVSM, AVSM**, YSM, SM, ADC
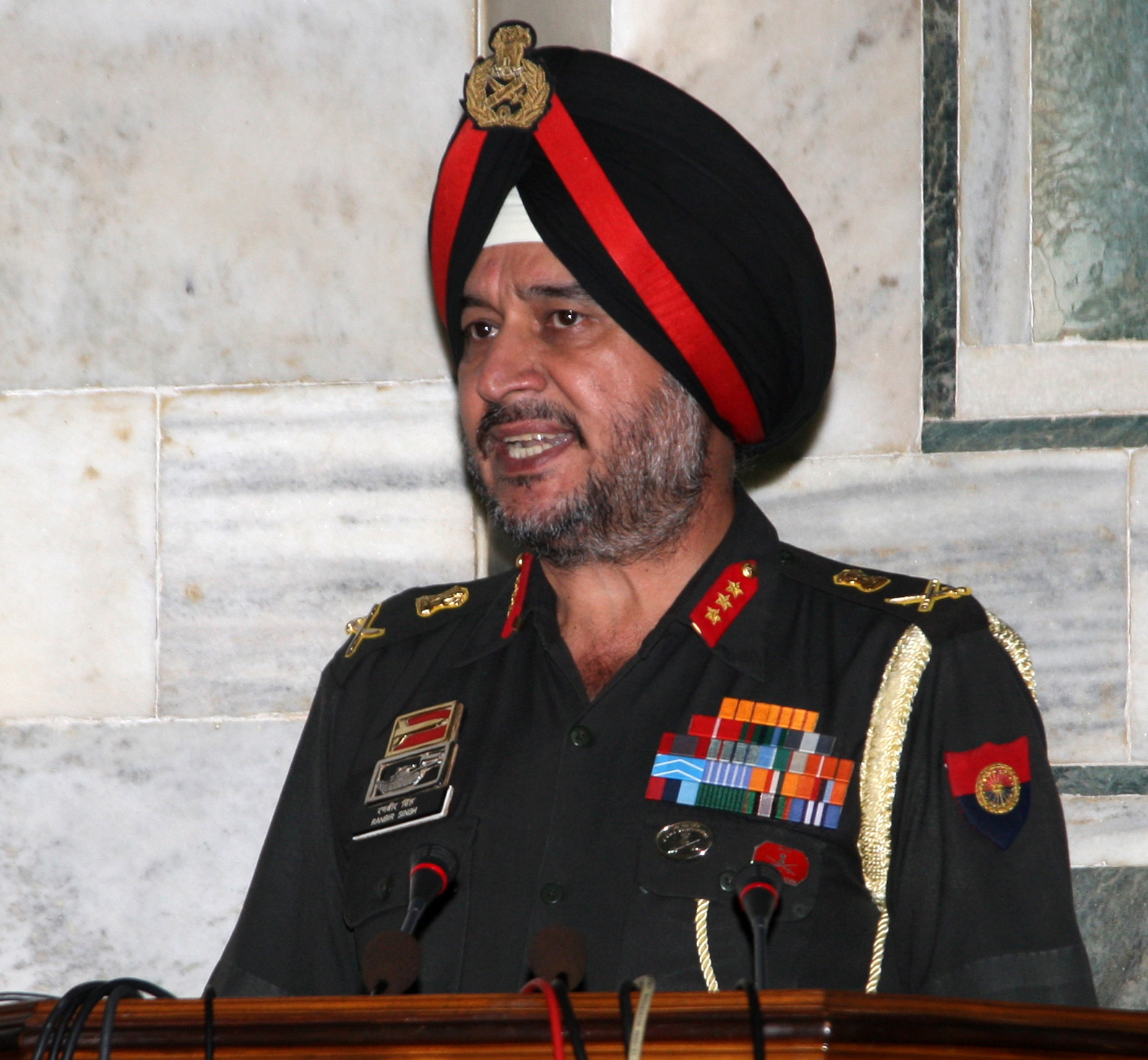
- Spouse: Kalpana
- Relatives: Colonel Manmohan Singh (retd) (Uncle)
- Military career
- Allegiance: India
- Branch: Indian Army
- Service years: 13 December 1980 – 31 January 2020
- Rank: Lieutenant General
- Service number: IC-39070P
- Unit: 9 Dogra
- Commands: Northern Army; I Corps; 33 Armoured Division; 181 Mountain Brigade
- Awards: Param Vishisht Seva Medal; Ati Vishisht Seva Medal (Bar); Yudh Seva Medal; Sena Medal

Lieutenant General Ranbir Singh, PVSM, AVSM & Bar, YSM, SM, ADC is a former General Officer in the Indian Army. He last served as the General Officer-Commanding-in-Chief (GOC-in-C) Northern Command. He assumed office on 1 June 2018 from Lt Gen Devraj Anbu who assumed the office of Vice Chief of the Army Staff. He was the Director General of Military Operations (DGMO) of the Indian Army during the 2016 Indian Line of Control strike and the Additional Director General of Military Operations (ADGMO) during the 2015 Indian counter-insurgency operation in Myanmar. He was considered the face of the operations because he briefed the media after both the strikes.

== Early life and education ==
Singh is from Jalandhar and his family belongs to Ambala Jattan, Hoshiarpur district, Punjab. His father, who was a JCO in the Indian Army, died when he was young. His uncle, Colonel Manmohan Singh (retd), adopted him when he was three years old.

He is an alumnus of St. Joseph’s Convent School, Lajpat Nagar; Sainik School, Kapurthala; National Defence Academy, Pune and Indian Military Academy, Dehradun. He has also attended Defence Services Staff College, Wellington; Faculty of Studies at Army War College, Mhow and Royal College of Defence Studies, London.

== Career ==
Singh was commissioned into the 9th battalion, Dogra Regiment on 13 December 1980. He has held various important Command, Staff and Instructor appointments during his career. He is considered to be an expert at counter insurgency operations, operational art and information operations. He has also served in the military operations directorate as a Colonel and Brigadier. His commands include the 181 Mountain Brigade, 33 Armoured division and I Corps (Mathura). He has held various staff appointments including that of Additional Director General of Military Operations(ADGMO) when he was Major general, Director General of Military Operations (DGMO) and Deputy Chief of Army Staff (Information Systems and Training). He has also served in UN Peacekeeping Missions to Rwanda and as a Chief Operations Officer at Sudan.

In 2011, he attended the Royal College of Defence Studies, London where he obtained a Master of Arts degree in International Relations from King's College London. His Indian course mates at the RCDS were Commodore Philipose George Pynumootil and Air Commodore Diptendu Choudhury.

During his career, he has been awarded the Yudh Seva Medal (2010) as the Commander of 181 Mountain Brigade, the Ati Vishisht Seva Medal twice (in 2015 and in 2018), and the Param Vishisht Seva Medal in 2020.

== Honours and decorations ==

Param Vishisht Seva Medal		Ati Vishisht Seva Medal (Bar)	
Yudh Seva Medal	Sena Medal	Samanya Seva Medal	Siachen Glacier Medal
Special Service Medal	Operation Vijay Medal	Operation Parakram Medal	Sainya Seva Medal
High Altitude Service Medal	Videsh Seva Medal	50th Anniversary of Independence Medal	30 Years Long Service Medal
20 Years Long Service Medal	9 Years Long Service Medal	UNAMIR	UNMIS

== Dates of rank ==
Insignia	Rank	Component	Date of rank
	Second Lieutenant	Indian Army	13 December 1980
	Lieutenant	Indian Army	13 December 1982
	Captain	Indian Army	13 December 1985
	Major	Indian Army	13 December 1991
	Lieutenant-Colonel	Indian Army	31 December 2002
	Colonel	Indian Army	1 February 2005
	Brigadier	Indian Army	1 November 2008 (seniority from 21 January 2008)
	Major General	Indian Army	26 June 2013 (seniority from 9 April 2011)
	Lieutenant-General	Indian Army	2 December 2015

== Personal life ==
Singh met his wife when he was posted in Mumbai and they have a son.

Military offices
Preceded by Devraj Anbu	General Officer-Commanding-in-Chief Northern Command; 1 June 2018 – 31 January 2020	Succeeded by Yogesh Kumar Joshi
Preceded by Shokin Chauhan	General Officer Commanding I Corps; 30 November 2016 – 28 December 2017	Succeeded by Taranjit Singh
Preceded by	Director General of Military Operations	Succeeded by Anil Kumar Bhatt
