= Taranjit Singh (general) =

Lieutenant General Taranjit Singh AVSM, VSM*
- Military career
- Allegiance: India
- Branch: Indian Army
- Service years: 19 December 1981 – Present
- Rank: Lieutenant General
- Service number: IC-39874K
- Unit: 65th Armoured Regiment
- Commands: I Corps
- Conflicts: Operation Pawan
- Awards: Ati Vishisht Seva Medal; Vishisht Seva Medal*

Lieutenant General Taranjit Singh, AVSM, VSM*, is the current Dy Chief of Integrated Defence Staff (Operations) previously he was General Officer Commanding I Corps of the Indian Army.

== Early life and education ==
He is an alumnus of National Defence Academy.

== Career ==
He was commissioned into 65th Armoured Regiment on 19 December 1981. He has special experience in mechanised warfare and operational art. He was part of the Indian Peacekeeping Force during Operation Pawan. He has held numerous commands including an armoured brigade and a Rapid Division which is part of a Strike Corps. He has also held staff appointments at the Army HQ and United Nations peacekeeping missions. He was General Officer Commanding I Corps of the Indian Army from 29 December 2017 to 31 January 2019. He assumed the post from Lt General Ranbir Singh.

During his career, he has been awarded the Vishisht Seva Medal twice (2016 and 2017) for his service and the Ati Vishisht Seva Medal in 2019.

== Honours and decorations ==

Ati Vishisht Seva Medal	Vishisht Seva Medal	Special Service Medal	Operation Vijay Medal
Operation Parakram Medal	Sainya Seva Medal	Videsh Seva Medal	50th Anniversary of Independence Medal
30 Years Long Service Medal	20 Years Long Service Medal	9 Years Long Service Medal	UN Mission in Angola Medal

Military offices
Preceded by Ranbir Singh	General Officer Commanding I Corps; 29 December 2017 -	Succeeded by Amardeep Singh Bhinder
