= Military Hospital, Hisar =

Coordinates: 29.11°N 75.81°E

- Indian Army Medical Corps

Geography
- Location: Hisar Military Station, Haryana, India

Organisation
- Care system: Free from Army and Ex-servicemen Contributory Health Scheme (ECHS) for the ex-servicemen and their families
- Funding: Government hospital
- Type: Non-teaching
- Affiliated university: Indian Army Medical Corps

Services
- Emergency department: Intensive care unit (ICU)
- Beds: 250

History
- Opened: 2010

Links
- Website: https://echs.gov.in
- Lists: Hospitals in India

Military Hospital, Hisar at Hisar Military Station, Haryana, India is a 250-bed multi-specialty hospital with Intensive care unit (ICU), 9 medical specialties, physiotherapy, and blood bank for the free treatment of Army and ex-army personnel and their families.

== History ==
The Military Hospital in Hisar is the 111th hospital of the Indian Army Medical Corps which provides medical services to all Army personnel.

In 2011, a 250-bedded Military Hospital, Hisar was inaugurated to provide medical facilities.

=== Construction ===
Work for the construction of hospital was tendered to Varindra Constructions Limited by Chief Engineer Jaipur Zone (Military Engineering Services department of Defence services under MoD) in the year 2006–2007.

The work was completed in 2010 at cost of the work was Rs. 38.00 Crores approx. at 2010 price.

== Specialities ==
The hospital has an Intensive care unit (ICU).

When fully commissioned the hospital will have nine medical specialties.

In addition, hospital also has Polyclinic, Blood Bank, Physiotherapy Department, medical test laboratory, etc.

== See also ==
- List of Armed Forces Hospitals In India
