= Surinder Singh (general) =

Indian Army officer

Lieutenant General Surinder Singh PVSM, AVSM & Bar, VSM
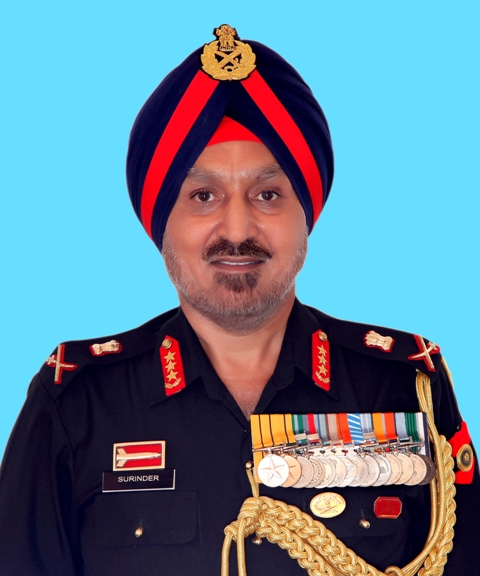
- Military career
- Allegiance: India
- Branch: Indian Army
- Service years: 1979 – 31 July 2019
- Rank: Lieutenant General
- Service number: IC-38266W
- Unit: Brigade of the Guards
- Commands: Western Command; XXXIII Corps
- Conflicts: 2019 India–Pakistan border skirmishes
- Awards: Param Vishisht Seva Medal; Ati Vishisht Seva Medal & Bar; Vishisht Seva Medal

Lieutenant General Surinder Singh, PVSM, AVSM & Bar, VSM is a retired officer of Indian Army who served as General Officer Commander-in-Chief (GOC-in-C), Western Command. He took office of the Chairman, Punjab Public Service Commission on 21 August 2019.

== Early life and education ==
Singh is an alumnus of National Defence Academy, Pune and Indian Military Academy, Dehradun. He has also attended National Defence College, New Delhi and the Higher Command Course at Staff College, Camberley (Surrey).

== Career ==
Singh was commissioned into 2nd Battalion Brigade of the Guards in 1979. He has vast experience counter insurgency and operational environments. He has taught at The Infantry School, Mhow and College of Military Engineering, Pune. He has commanded an Armoured Brigade, a Division in a Strike Corps and a Mountain Corps in SikkimXXXIII Corps (Sukhna). He has also held staff appointments at the Military Operations Directorate, the Perspective Planning Directorate at the Army Headquarters, He has also served as a Team Leader of military observers with the UN mission in Liberia and has had other key operational roles.

He assumed the office of General Officer Commander-in-Chief (GOC-in-C), Western Command on 17 September 2016, and served in the same capacity till 31 July 2019.

During four decades of his career, he has been awarded the Vishisht Seva Medal in 2010, the Ati Vishisht Seva Medal in 2015, Bar to Ati Vishisht Seva Medal in 2017 and the Param Vishisht Seva Medal in 2019. He was also ‘The Colonel’ of the Brigade of The Guards.

After his retirement from Indian Army, Singh was appointed Chairman of Punjab Public Service Commission.

== Honours and decorations ==

Param Vishisht Seva Medal	Ati Vishisht Seva Medal		Vishisht Seva Medal
Samanya Seva Medal	Special Service Medal	Operation Vijay Medal	Operation Parakram Medal
Sainya Seva Medal	High Altitude Service Medal	Videsh Seva Medal	50th Anniversary of Independence Medal
30 Years Long Service Medal	20 Years Long Service Medal	9 Years Long Service Medal	UN Mission in Liberia

== Dates of rank ==
Insignia	Rank	Component	Date of rank
	Second Lieutenant	Indian Army	22 December 1979
	Lieutenant	Indian Army	22 December 1981
	Captain	Indian Army	13 January 1983
	Major	Indian Army	22 December 1990
	Lieutenant-Colonel	Indian Army	27 September 1997
	Colonel	Indian Army	11 August 1999
	Brigadier	Indian Army	1 August 2007(seniority from 16 July 2007)
	Major General	Indian Army	30 April 2012 (seniority from 11 October 2010)
	Lieutenant-General	Indian Army	24 April 2015

Military offices
Preceded by K J Singh	General Officer Commander-in-Chief Western Command; 17 September 2016 – 31 July 2019	Succeeded by Ravendra Pal Singh
Preceded by	General Officer Commanding XXXIII Corps; 2014 - 2016	Succeeded by S K Jha
