= Battle of Sirhind (1764) =

1764 conflict between the Durrani Empire and Sikh Misls

- Part of Indian Campaign of Ahmad Shah Durrani
Date	14 January 1764
Location	Sirhind
Result	Sikh victory
Territorial changes	Sikhs capture Sirhind.

Belligerents
Sikh Misls	Durrani Empire

Commanders and leaders
Jassa Singh Ahluwalia; Charat Singh; Jassa Singh Ramgarhia; Hari Singh Dhillon; Jai Singh Kanhaiya; Baghel Singh; Sardar Chuhar Singh; Aghar Singh †; Ala Singh; Tara Singh Ghaiba	Zain Khan Sirhindi (executed)

Strength
23,000 According to Surjit Singh Gandhi; 40,000 According to Joseph Davey Cunningham; 50,000 According to Giani Gian Singh	Unknown believed to be smaller

Casualties and losses
Unknown	10,000 horsemen killed.

The Battle of Sirhind was fought between Durrani Empire and Sikh Misls on 14 January 1764.

== Background ==
In January 1764, after the sack of Morinda, the Sikhs marched upon Sirhind. Zain Khan Sirhindi, the Afghan commander in charge of the region, had been facing mounting issues. His leadership had become corrupt and ineffective. He stopped paying his soldiers and revenue officials, instead resorting to plundering nearby villages for personal gain. The stolen goods were used to pay his men, but the payments didn’t even cover a fraction of their dues. As a result, many of his soldiers, starving and dissatisfied, began to desert him and join other leaders like Najib-ud-Daula. Miskin, an eyewitness who had worked for Zain Khan, left his service in early 1763, deeply disappointed by his greed and mismanagement. Zain Khan realized he was alone, with no help coming from his allies, and had to face the Sikhs on his own.

== Battle ==
Ahmad Shah Durrani returned to Afghanistan after appointing Zain Khan Sirhindi as the governor of Sirhind. Zain Khan Sirhindi, the Durrani governor, was attacked by a well-equipped force of 40,000 Sikhs. In the battle, the Sikhs killed Sirhindi and many other leading officers of the Durrani army. The Sikhs then established their rule between the rivers Satluj and Yamuna. The Sikhs captured Sirhind and later handed over the land to Maharaja Ala Singh of Patiala State. The city's inhabitants faced particularly harsh treatment from the Sikh armies who razed much of the city and made a deliberate policy of destroying the city's buildings and mosques.

Zain Khan Sirhindi attempted to strike first, hoping to take advantage of the Sikhs’ scattered forces. One night, he attacked the Taruna Dal Sikh group near the village of Pir Zain Khan Munayra. However, the Sikhs had already planned a coordinated attack on Sirhind, and as soon as they heard of Zain Khan’s assault, the other Sikh groups rushed to his aid. Soon, Zain Khan was surrounded from all sides. Desperate to escape, he tried to divert the Sikhs’ attention by sending detachments with weapons to distract them. While some Sikhs got involved in the plunder, Jassa Singh Ahluwalia’s group continued to close in on Zain Khan. Despite his efforts to flee, Zain Khan was shot and killed during his attempt to escape. His troops, in a panic, scattered in all directions, but the Sikhs relentlessly pursued and slaughtered them.

== Aftermath ==
The city was set on fire, and most of the buildings were destroyed. The Sikhs also demolished the walls of the fort where Guru Gobind Singh’s sons had been bricked up alive. In their memory, they built a platform at the site of their execution and established a Gurdwara named, Fatehgarh Sahib in honor of the Guru’s sons. This victory was a major triumph for the Sikhs, who had not initially aimed to capture Sirhind but took advantage of the opportunity after Zain Khan’s defeat.

The battle was a landmark moment in Sikh history, as it marked the beginning of Sikh-domination in the cis-Sutlej tract. Sirhind had been attacked by the Sikhs four times in the 18th century. After the last attack known as the Battle of Sirhind in 13–14 January 1764, the cis-Sutlej tract became dominated by Sikhs after its Afghan governor, Zain Khan Sirhindi, was killed by a coalition of Sikh forces of both the Buddha Dal and Taruna Dal divisions of the Dal Khalsa military of the Sikh Confederacy. The victory of the Sikhs ended foreign Afghan-rule over the region. Lepel Henry Griffin stated:

The storm burst at last. The Sikhs of the Majha country of Lahore, Amritsar, Ferozepur combined their forces at Sirhind, routed and killed the Afghan governor, Zain Khan and pouring across Sutlej occupied the whole country to the Jamna without further opposition. It is enough to say that with few exceptions, the leading families of today are the direct descendants of the conquerors of Zain Khan.

— Lepel Henry Griffin

Artillery, supplies, and treasures fell into the possession of the Sikh forces after the victory at Sirhind, which helped them further, especially Ala Singh of Patiala. The victory helped consolidate the political entity of Patiala. The settlement of Sirhind was mostly completely destroyed after the battle, which meant its former residents shifted to other locations, especially Patiala in Ala Singh's state. Ala Singh would strike coins in the aftermath of the victory, with the coins bearing similarities to coins that had earlier been struck by Ahmad Shah Abdali at the Sirhind mint. The triumph of the Sikhs attracted the hostilities of the Malerkotla ruler Bhikhan Khan, whom was anxious about a similar fate for Malerkotla, as Malerkotla had assisted Zain Khan in the Vadda Ghalughara massacre. Amar Singh of Patiala and Bhikhan Khan later would fight at Kakra, with Patiala prevailing and capturing the settlements of Sherpur and Bhasaur, and the Malerkotla ruler being killed. Also, Amar Singh obtained an Afghan sword of the Malerkotla ruler as war-booty.
