= Khem Karan Singh =

Indian military officer (1921–2016)

Lieutenant General Khem Karan Singh MVC
- Born: March 5, 1919
- Died: July 26, 2016 (aged 97)
- Military career
- Allegiance: India
- Branch: Indian Army
- Rank: Lieutenant General
- Service number: IC-39607H
- Unit: 16th Light Cavalry
- Commands: Central Command; I Corps; 1 Armoured Division; 16th Light Cavalry
- Awards: Padma Bhushan; Maha Vir Chakra

Lieutenant General Khem Karan Singh, MVC (March 5, 1921 – July 26, 2016) was an Indian senior military officer. He was awarded the Padma Bhushan for his role in the 1971 Indo-Pakistani War. He also received the Maha Vir Chakra for his services during the Indo-Pakistani war of 1965.

== Early life and education ==
He was born in 1919 in Rohtak district in Haryana. A third generation Cavalry Officer, his grandfather Risaldar Major Ram Singh and father Honorary Major Bharat Singh has served in the 14th Murray's Jat Lancers (which later became 20th Lancers). Singh attended the St. Stephen's College, Delhi.

== Military career ==
Singh was commissioned into the 16th Light Cavalry in 1941, which he later commanded. In the Indo-Pakistani War of 1965, Singh commanded the 1 Armoured Brigade and was awarded the Maha Vir Chakra.

=== Maha Vir Chakra ===
The citation for the Maha Vir Chakra reads as follows:

Gazette Notification: 129 Pres/65,11-11-65

Operation: 1965 Op Riddle Date of Award: 06 Sep 1965

CITATION

BRIGADIER KHEM KARAN SINGH

IC-2014

Brigadier Khem Karan Singh, commander of an armoured brigade, led his brigade and some additional armoured units into action during the operations in the Sialkot Sector from 6 to 22 September 1965. He was to cope with enemy tanks which were superior in number and better in technical performance.

During the first three days of battle, the force under the command of Brigadier Singh destroyed over 75 enemy tanks at the cost of a small number of our own tanks. This was possible due to Brigadier Singh's personal example, as he, in his own task, was present at the point of maximum enemy threat.

Brigadier Singh fought the battle of Phillora for three days and nights, throwing out the enemy from this important communication centre. The enemy's morale was so much demoralised because of this action that he avoided close combat and engaged our forces only at extreme range.

Brigadier Khem Karan Singh displayed outstanding leadership, high tactical ability and great devotion to duty, in the best traditions of the Indian Army.

After the war, Singh was promoted to the rank of Major General and commanded a division and served as the Chief of Staff of the Western Command. He then took over the important appointment of Director of Military Operations (DMO) at Army HQ under the Chief of the Army Staff General Sam Manekshaw. In October 1971, just before the outbreak of the war, Singh was sent to command I Corps, then the only Strike Corps of the Indian Army. For his meritorious service, Singh was awarded the third highest civilian award - the Padma Bhushan.

In November 1973, Singh was promoted to Army Commander grade and took over as the 5th General Officer Commanding-in-Chief (GOC-in-C) Central Command.

After a two-year stint as GOC-in-C Central Command, Singh retired in 1975.

Military offices
Preceded by H K Sibal	General Officer Commanding-in-Chief Central Command; 1973 - 1975	Succeeded by J S Nakai
