= El Camino High School (Rohnert Park) =

Coordinates: 38°20′26″N 122°41′26″W

- Rohnert Park, California

Information
- Staff: 2.10 (FTE)
- Enrollment: 52 (2023-2024)
- Student to teacher ratio: 24.76

El Camino High School is an alternative education high school located in Rohnert Park, California in the United States.

== Campus ==
El Camino High School along with two other schools share a campus designed for what used to be Richard Crane Elementary School.

== See also ==
- Cotati-Rohnert Park Unified School District
