= Ravendra Pal Singh (general) =

Lieutenant general in the Indian Army

Lieutenant General R P Singh PVSM, AVSM, VSM
- Military career
- Allegiance: India
- Branch: Indian Army
- Service years: June 1982 – October 2021
- Rank: Lieutenant General
- Service number: IC-40302P
- Unit: Mechanised Infantry Regiment
- Commands: Western Army; XXI Corps
- Awards: Param Vishisht Seva Medal; Ati Vishisht Seva Medal; Vishisht Seva Medal

Lieutenant General Ravendra Pal Singh PVSM, AVSM, VSM is a former General Officer Commanding-in-Chief (GOC-in-C) Western Command of the Indian Army. He assumed office on 1 August 2019, succeeding Gen Surinder Singh.

== Early life and education ==
Gen Singh was commissioned into the Mechanised Infantry Regiment on 12 Jun 1982. An alumnus of National Defence Academy and Indian Military Academy, the General officer has attended the Defence Services Staff College, Senior Command Course, Higher Command Course and the National Defence College.

== Career ==
The general officer has held various regimental, staff and instructional appointments. These include brigade major of an Infantry Brigade in intense Counter Insurgency areas in J&K, GSO-2, Military Intelligence Directorate at IHQ of MoD (Army), Col GS (Military Doctrine) at Army War College, Mhow, BGS (Ops) of a command in the Western Theatre, ADG (Discipline & Vigilance), DG LWE & DG DC&W at IHQ of MoD (Army). He was instructor at School of Armoured Warfare Ahmednagar and was also posted as United Nations military observer in United Nations in Africa.

The general officer commanded a Mechanised Infantry Battalion, an Armoured Brigade and an Infantry Division in the Western Theatre.

He was also 'the colonel' of The Mechanised Infantry Regiment.

== Military awards and aecorations ==
He is a recipient of Param Vishisht Seva Medal, Ati Vishisht Seva Medal, and Vishisht Seva Medal for distinguished service.

Param Vishisht Seva Medal	Ati Vishisht Seva Medal		Vishisht Seva Medal
Wound Medal	Special Service Medal	Operation Vijay Medal	Operation Parakram Medal
Sainya Seva Medal	High Altitude Service Medal	Videsh Seva Medal	50th Anniversary of Independence Medal
30 Years Long Service Medal	20 Years Long Service Medal	9 Years Long Service Medal	UN Mission in Angola Medal

== Dates of rank ==
Insignia	Rank	Component	Date of rank
	Second Lieutenant	Indian Army	12 June 1982
	Lieutenant	Indian Army	12 June 1984
	Captain	Indian Army	12 June 1987
	Major	Indian Army	12 June 1993
	Lieutenant-Colonel	Indian Army	16 December 2004
	Colonel	Indian Army	1 March 2006
	Brigadier	Indian Army	1 June 2010 (seniority from 7 January 2009)
	Major General	Indian Army	1 January 2015 (seniority from 4 June 2012)
	Lieutenant-General	Indian Army	20 May 2017 (seniority from 1 May)

Military offices
Preceded by Surinder Singh	General Officer Commanding-in-Chief Western Command; 1 August 2019 - 31 October 2021	Succeeded by Nav Kumar Khanduri
Preceded by Iqroop Singh Ghuman	General Officer Commanding XXI Corps; June 2018 - July 2019	Succeeded by Yogendra Dimri
