= Kulwant Singh (general) =

Indian military officer

Major General Kulwant Singh UYSM
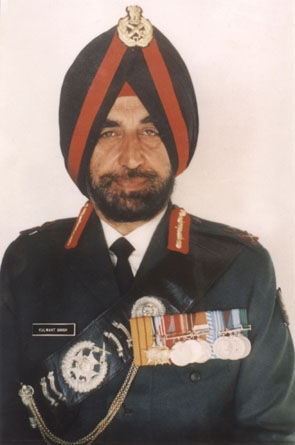
- Born: 10 September 1939 (age 87); Kohmari, Murree, British India
- Other name: Kalwant Singh
- Military career
- Allegiance: India
- Branch: Indian Army
- Service years: 7 June 1959 – 30 September 1995
- Rank: Major General
- Service number: IC-11528
- Unit: 19 Rajputana Rifles
- Commands: 19 Rajputana Rifles; 104 Infantry Brigade; 27 Mountain Division
- Conflicts: Indo-Pakistani War of 1965; Indo-Pakistani War of 1971; Sri Lankan Civil War
- Awards: Uttam Yudh Seva Medal

Major General Kulwant Singh, (Note: Certain sources may also spelt his name as Kalwant Singh.) UYSM (born 10 September 1939), is an Indian former military officer. He last served as the General Officer Commanding (GOC) the 27 Mountain Division. He had earlier served as the Deputy GOC 54th Infantry Division that was a part the Indian Peace Keeping Force (IPKF) in Sri Lanka, and as Deputy Commandant and Chief Instructor of the Infantry School at Mhow.

== Early life and education ==
Singh was born on 10 September 1939, at Kohmari (now in Pakistan). He traveled with his family during the partition of India in 1947 and settled in Lucknow, India. He is the son of Sewa Singh, who was a Major with the Indian Army during the Second World War and was awarded the MBE. Singh completed his primary education at Rawalpindi, Pakistan (when it was a part of British India) and then completed rest of the school education at Lucknow, India.

Singh joined the National Defence Academy (NDA) at Khadakwasla near Pune, Maharashtra in 1955 and thereafter the Indian Military Academy (IMA) at Dehradun in 1958. He qualified for the prestigious Higher Command Course at College of Combat, Mhow and is a graduate of the Defence Service Staff College (DSSC), Wellington, India.

Singh received his Ph.D. from Devi Ahilya University, Indore and M.Sc. in Defence Studies from University of Madras. He holds a postgraduate diploma in Human Resource Development from Indira Gandhi National Open University (IGNOU) in New Delhi. He also holds a postgraduate diploma in Management from the Regional College of Management and Technology (RCMT), Secunderabad.

== Army career ==
Singh was commissioned into the 62 Cavalry of the Indian Army in June 1959. He commanded the 19 Rajputana Rifles, and as a full Colonel, he raised the Naugam Sector. As a Brigadier, he commanded the 104 Infantry Brigade. Thereafter, Singh was posted as BGS Headquarters Western Command. He was the Dy. G.O.C (General Officer Commanding) of the 54 Infantry Division. Singh was one of the key strategists in the battle for Jaffna with the IPKF in Sri Lanka. As a Major-General, he was the General Officer Commanding (G.O.C.) of the 27 Mountain Division at Kalimpong. He was then posted as MGGS Headquarters at Western Command.

Singh is a veteran of two wars with Pakistan (1965 and 1971). He commanded squadron of tanks in both the wars. Singh also commanded two active combat formations: a division deployed along Indo-China border, and a Brigade deployed on the Line of Control (LoC) against Pakistan in Jammu and Kashmir (both in snow bound high altitude areas). He also has long experience in tackling terrorism and insurgency.

== Post-retirement ==
Singh retired in 1995 as Major-General from the Infantry School, Mhow. After retirement, he became the Director of Maharishi Institute of Management (MIM) at Noida, and Vice Chancellor of Maharishi University of Management and Technology (MUMT) located at Bilaspur in Chhattisgarh.

Singh was made the Defense Minister of Global Country of World Peace founded by Maharishi Mahesh Yogi. He was also the Director General of Invincible Defense (Vedic Defense), Director General of Maharishi Corporate Development Programme (MCDP), the Director General for Center for Advanced Military Science (CAMS), USA and the Director, Global Union of Scientists for Peace.

Singh held a press conference at the National Press Club in Washington on the morning of 11 September 2001, where he and other scientists advocated deployment of Invincible Defense Technology for peace. The press conference had to be stopped mid-way because of the 9/11 attack on the World Trade Center complex in Lower Manhattan on the same day.

== Personal life ==
Singh was married to Sonya Kulwant Singh (died in 1999). He has two daughters, Harleena Singh and Preeti Singh. His family is based in Panchkula, Haryana, India.

== Awards and decorations ==
During his career, Singh was awarded the Uttam Yudh Seva Medal (1988), the second highest decoration of senior officers, during IPKF operations in Sri Lanka, for outstanding performance in a war situation.

Uttam Yudh Seva Medal		Samar Seva Star	
Paschimi Star	Special Service Medal		Raksha Medal
Sangram Medal	Sainya Seva Medal	High Altitude Service Medal	Videsh Seva Medal
25th Independence Anniversary Medal	30 Years Long Service Medal	20 Years Long Service Medal	9 Year Long Service Medal

== Publications ==
His articles have been published in various newspapers and websites as a defense expert advocating the Maharishi Invincible Defense Technology for peace. Singh has also written articles for The Tribune newspaper on various episodes of Sikh history.

== See also ==
- Indian Peace Keeping Force
- Rajputana Rifles
