= Ambala Jattan =

Ambala Jattan Ambaa'n wala
- village
- Location in Punjab, India Ambala Jattan (India)
- Coordinates: 31.721049°N 75.708944°E
- Country: India
- State: Punjab
- District: Hoshiarpur
- Founder: Hardas (Baba Kharh Sutta)

Government
  - Type: Village Panchat
  - Body: Panchat

Languages
  - Official: Punjabi
- Time zone: UTC+5:30 (IST)

Ambala Jattan (Village ID 30864) is a village in Punjab, India, in the district Hoshiarpur, near Garhdiwala. Ambala Jattan is located 28.9 km away from the main Hoshiarpur city and 150 km from the state capital Chandigarh. According to the 2011 census it has a population of 1125 living in 246 households. Its main agriculture product is wheat.
