= Flirting with Fate (novel) =

- First edition
- Author: Preeti Singh
- Language: English
- Publisher: Mahaveer Publishers, New Delhi
- Publication date: July 2012
- Publication place: India
- Media type: Print (Paperback)
- Pages: 248
- ISBN: 978-81-8352-032-4

Flirting With Fate is a 2012 novel conceived by Pinaki Chaudhuri, written and edited by Indian author and Freelance Editor Writer Preeti Singh. The book was released on Saturday 14 July 2012 by Writer Vivek Atray at CII in Chandigarh. Preeti was fond of writing since the age of nine.

An article in the Times of India stated that Preetis debut book is crime thriller which took about 5 years to complete it and is dedicated to her Mother & Kiran Bedi.

The story is a journey of a boy from childhood to youth, who takes the easy path of crime, bloodshed, theft, rape, lies and which makes him realise that one has to reap what one sows. The story is set in the backdrop of Shimla hills and the eighties era.

Preeti Singh was also interviewed by Spectralhues Website & Isahitya Online Magazine.

== Plot ==
A journey of a boy where he yearns for love...almost finds it but fate takes it away from him. The story of this book begins in the suburbs of Shimla where a little boy is adopted in an orphanage. He gets all attention and love there but yearns to be adopted by a wealthy family. A turn of events happen where he is rejected often, this giving birth to the devil in him. As and when he is denied love and acceptance, Anand, the boy turns to crime to get what he wants. Petty thefts and lies slowly lay their foundation in him and soon he moves onto larger crimes like rape and murder. After committing plenty of petty crimes in Shimla, he moves to Delhi to make quick money and return to Shimla to his lady love. He does that…makes quick money the wrong way but when he returns, his girl is no longer his. The cruel twist of fate teaches him a lesson and he reaps what he has sown…it all comes back when he is hit step by step by God who enables Karma to return. The highlight of the book is a dog Fluffy who is a witness to all the crimes but is unable to tell anyone, being a dog…but his constant chatter and him sharing his thoughts now and then is a unique concept. The end is completely unpredictable with each scene being a compelling read, making the book difficult to put down. The mystery remains how Anand is punished in the end.
