= Zain Khan Sirhindi =

Mughal Faujdar of Sirhind, India

Zain-ud-Din Khan known as Zain Khan Sirhindi (died 14 January 1764) was the Mughal Faujdar of Sirhind, a serviceman of Shah Alam II, and an ally of Najib-ud-Daula and Ahmad Shah Durrani. Zain Khan Sirhindi fought during the Third Battle of Panipat and strengthened Mughal rule in the region.

== Biography ==
Zain Khan was sipahsalar and a noble at the court of Ahmad Shah Durrani. After the conquest of Delhi by Durrani, (Note: also known as Abdālī) he held the subahdarship of Sirhind.

Zain Khan however soon grew notorious for plundering villages within his own territory as well as refusing to pay his own soldiers. Tahmas Khan was disgusted by Zain Khan's actions and he soon left his services and predicted that Zain Khan along with the city of Sirhind would fall.

Zain Khan supported the Durranis and participated in the Battle of Kup of Sikhs that occurred on 5 February 1762.

In January 1764, Ahmad Shah Durrani led his sixth expedition to assist Sadat Yar Khan of Doab and Zain Khan Sirhindi and his Mughal Army which was later overrun outside Sirhind, by 36,000 Sikh rebels led by Jassa Singh Ahluwalia, who plundered Lahore and the upper Doab.

== Death ==
Zain Khan Sirhindi was killed after capture in the Sikh invasion of Sirhind prompted by the absence of Ahmad Shah Abdali from India at Khorasan at the Battle of Sirhind.

== Descendants ==
Zain Khan was originally from the Khan Khel (family) of Tarakzaī Lalpura Mohmands. His direct descendants are traced in the book "The Mohmands" by W. R. H. Merk. Most influential of them are the ones descended from the four sons of Nauroz Khan, who migrated to Peshawar.

Most influential member of the family is Khan Tahir Zaman Khan, who is living in Peshawar and has khani over lalpura.

== See also ==
- Shah Alam II

== Reading ==
- Singh, Ganda (1959). Ahmad Shāh Durrānī - Father of Modern Afghanistan.

Military personnel of the Mughal Empire
