= East Central High School =

East Central High School may refer to several schools in the United States:

- East Central High School (Indiana), Saint Leon, Indiana
- East Central High School (Minnesota), East Central Schools, Pine County, Minnesota
- East Central High School (Mississippi), Jackson County, Mississippi
- East Central High School (Oklahoma), Tulsa, Oklahoma
- East Central High School (Texas), San Antonio, Texas
