= I Corps (India) =

Strike Corps of the Indian Army

- Indian Army I Corps Formation Sign
- Active: 1965–present
- Country: India
- Branch: Indian Army
- Role: Strike Corps
- Size: Corps
- Part of: Northern Command
- Garrison/HQ: Mathura
- Engagements: Indo-Pakistani War of 1965; Indo-Pakistani War of 1971 Sino-Indian border dispute: 2020–2021 China–India skirmishes

Commanders
- Current commander: Lt Gen Akhilesh Kumar
- Notable commanders: General Joginder Jaswant Singh; General Vishwa Nath Sharma; Lt Gen Sagat Singh; Lt Gen Khem Karan Singh

The I Corps is a military field formation of the Indian Army. The Corps is headquartered at Mathura in Uttar Pradesh. It was raised on 1 April 1965. It was still being raised when it was despatched to the front in 1965. Raised as the First Strike Corps of the Indian Army, it was launched into operations in the Sialkot sector. The Corps conducted a counteroffensive during the Indo-Pakistani War of 1965. In the 1971 war against Pakistan, it took part in the Battle of Basantar.

The corps conducts Exercise Parvat Prahaar (Mountain Strike) to maintain combat readiness in the northern sector along Line of Actual Control. The exercise which is conducted in high-altitude, rugged terrain conditions, includes tanks, artillery (including K-9 Vajra T), air-defence systems and other assets. The editions of the exercise are 2022 and 2024.

== Indo-Pakistani War of 1971 ==
Under Lt. Gen. K. K. Singh during 1971, the composition of the corps was:

- X Sector
- 36th Infantry Division (8, 115 Brigades initially)
- 39th Infantry Division
- 54th Infantry Division

== Present Day ==
In 2021, the Strike One Corps was shifted to Northern Command from the South Western Command to focus on Sino-Indian border in Ladakh. According to reports, around 500 main battle tanks and 50,000 troops are deployed in Eastern Ladakh region.

The I Corps created in 1965 and headquartered at Mathura, consists of the following formations:

- 4 RAPID Division (Allahabad, Uttar Pradesh), also called Red Eagle Division.
  - 7 Infantry Brigade (Kanpur)
  - 41 Infantry Brigade (Lucknow)
  - 62 Infantry Brigade (Kanpur)
  - 4 Artillery Brigade (Allahabad)
- 6 Mountain Division (Bareilly, Uttar Pradesh) also called Garud Division
- 14 (Independent) Armoured Brigade, also called Black Chargers Brigade

The following were moved to direct command of South Western Command

- 33 Armoured Division (Hisar Military Station, Haryana), also called Dot On Target (DOT) Division, consisting of –
  - 33 Artillery Brigade
    - 1 × Towed artillery Regiment (e.g. Howitzer),
    - 1 × Self propelled artillery Regiment
    - 1 × LT AD (Light Air Defence) artillery and was located at Faridkot & Ferozpur
  - 39 Armoured Brigade (formerly 39th Mechanised Brigade)
  - 57 Armoured Brigade (formerly 57th Mechanised Brigade)
  - 88 Armoured Brigade (formerly 88th Mechanised Brigade).
  - 627th (Independent) Armoured Air Defence Brigade (formerly '627th (Independent) Mechanised Air Defence Brigade')
- 42 Artillery Division (Bassi, Rajasthan), also called Strategic Striker Division.

== List of General Officers Commanding ==
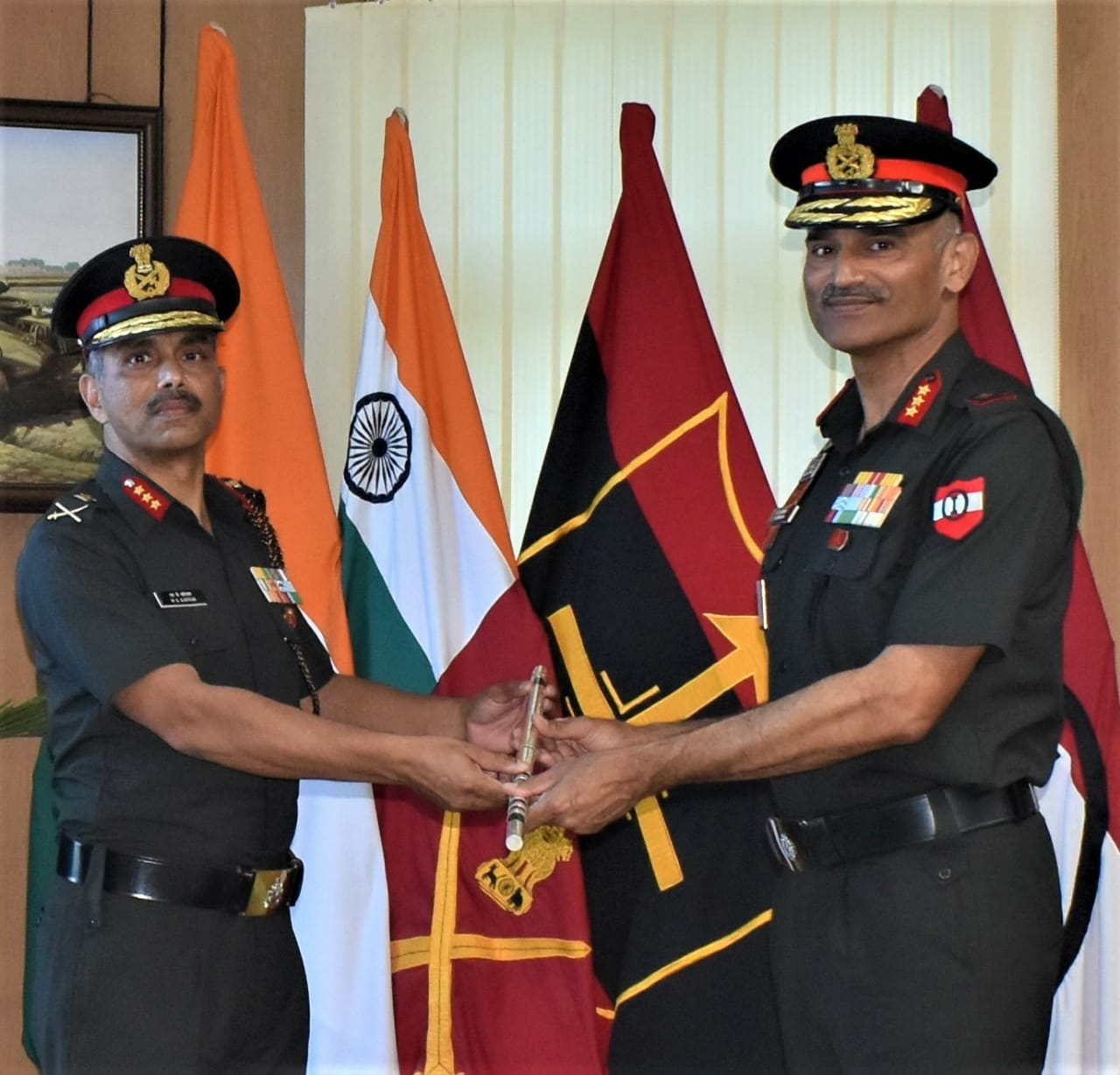
Lt Gen Manoj Kumar Katiyar taking over as the General Officer Commanding of 'Strike 1' from Lt Gen CP Cariappa, 5 April 2021.

Rank	Name	Appointment Date	Left office	Unit of Commission	References
Lieutenant General	Patrick Oswald Dunn	May 1965	January 1967	3rd Gorkha Rifles	
Lieutenant General	Jahangir Tehmursap Sataravala	January 1967	August 1971	13th Frontier Force Rifles	
Lieutenant General	Khem Karan Singh	August 1971	November 1973	16th Light Cavalry	
Lieutenant General	Sagat Singh	November 1973	November 1974	3rd Gorkha Rifles	
Lieutenant General	D.K. Chandorkar	December 1974	March 1978	Rajputana Rifles	
Lieutenant General	Jaswant Singh	March 1978	January 1980	Punjab Regiment	
Lieutenant General	Tirath Singh Oberoi	January 1980	August 1981	Punjab Regiment, Parachute Regiment	
Lieutenant General	Harish Chandra Dutta	August 1981	August 1982	8th Gorkha Rifles	
Lieutenant General	Anand Sarup	August 1982	August 1984	8th Gorkha Rifles	
Lieutenant General	Vishwa Nath Sharma	October 1984	March 1986	16th Light Cavalry	
Lieutenant General	Y.S. Tomar	March 1986	June 1987	The Grenadiers	
Lieutenant General	R.N. Mahajan	June 1987	December 1988	Kumaon Regiment	
Lieutenant General	R. Sharma	December 1988	January 1991	2nd Lancers	
Lieutenant General	V.K. Singh	January 1991	April 1992	Madras Regiment	
Lieutenant General	Y.M. Bammi	April 1992	July 1993	4th Gorkha Rifles	
Lieutenant General	A.S. Sandhu	July 1993	April 1995	Deccan Horse	
Lieutenant General	Vijay Oberoi	April 1995	June 1997	Maratha Light Infantry	
Lieutenant General	Rajendra Singh Kadyan	August 1997	January 2001	Rajputana Rifles	
Lieutenant General	J.J. Singh	January 2001	December 2002	Maratha Light Infantry	
Lieutenant General	Tej S Pathak	December 2002	May 2004	Parachute Regiment	
Lieutenant General	Susheel Gupta	May 2004	April 2006	Jammu and Kashmir Rifles	
Lieutenant General	P.C. Katoch	April 2006	October 2007	Parachute Regiment	
Lieutenant General	Tejinder Singh	October 2007	October 2008	Brigade of the Guards	
Lieutenant General	S.R. Ghosh	October 2008	November 2009	Brigade of The Guards	
Lieutenant General	A.K. Singh	November 2009	April 2011	7th Light Cavalry	
Lieutenant General	Ashok Singh	May 2011	August 2012	Brigade of The Guards	
Lieutenant General	P.R. Kumar	August 2012	August 2013	Regiment of Artillery, Army Aviation Corps	
Lieutenant General	Ravindra Thogde	August 2013	September 2014	1st Gorkha Rifles	
Lieutenant General	Ashok Bhim Shivane	September 2014	October 2015	7th Light Cavalry	
Lieutenant General	Shokin Chauhan	8 October 2015	November 2016	11th Gorkha Rifles	
Lieutenant General	Ranbir Singh	30 November 2016	29 December 2017	Dogra Regiment	
Lieutenant General	Taranjit Singh	29 December 2017	25 January 2019	65 Armoured Regiment	
Lieutenant General	Amardeep Singh Bhinder	25 January 2019	3 April 2020	Deccan Horse	
Lieutenant General	Codanda Poovaiah Cariappa	4 April 2020	5 April 2021	Rajputana Rifles	
Lieutenant General	Manoj Kumar Katiyar	6 April 2021	30 April 2022	Rajput Regiment	
Lieutenant General	Gajendra Joshi	1 May 2022	08 June 2023	Garhwal Rifles	
Lieutenant General	Sanjay Mitra	09 June 2023	16 June 2025	The Grenadiers	
Lieutenant General	V Hariharan	17 June 2025	30 September 2026	Garhwal Rifles	
Lieutenant General	Akhilesh Kumar	1 October 2026	Incumbent	Rajputana Rifles	
