= Ex-servicemen Contributory Health Scheme =

Indian government health scheme for military veterans

Agency overview
- Formed: 1 April 2003; 23 years ago
- Jurisdiction: Government of India
- Headquarters: New Delhi, India
- Parent department: Department of Ex-Servicemen Welfare, Ministry of Defence
- Website: www.echs.gov.in

The Ex-Servicemen Contributory Health Scheme (ECHS) is a health-care scheme of the Government of India for eligible former members of the Indian Armed Forces and their dependants. It provides outpatient care through ECHS polyclinics and access to specialised and inpatient treatment through service hospitals, government hospitals and empanelled private health-care organisations.

The scheme was sanctioned by the Ministry of Defence in December 2002 and came into effect on 1 April 2003. As of 31 March 2025, government figures placed its beneficiary base at approximately 6.4 million, including about 1.9 million primary members.

== History ==
Before ECHS was introduced, retired service personnel generally received treatment at service hospitals subject to the availability of facilities. The Government of India approved ECHS on 30 December 2002, and the scheme began operating on 1 April 2003.

At its inception, the government sanctioned a central organisation, 13 regional centres and 227 polyclinics. An expansion approved in 2010 added regional centres and polyclinics, including facilities in Nepal. Further expansion and upgrading of the network was sanctioned in 2024.

== Eligibility and membership ==
ECHS primarily covers former service personnel who receive a pension, disability pension or family pension from defence estimates, together with eligible dependants. Membership is compulsory for personnel who retired on or after 1 April 2003 and optional for those who retired earlier.

Coverage has subsequently been extended to specified additional groups, including eligible pensioners of the Territorial Army, Defence Security Corps, Indian Coast Guard, Military Nursing Service, Special Frontier Force and Assam Rifles, as well as Nepal-domiciled Gorkha pensioners and certain other categories. Members make a one-time contribution determined by their pension or rank category, subject to exemptions laid down by government policy.

== Organisation and services ==
Policy and executive oversight are exercised by the Department of Ex-Servicemen Welfare in the Ministry of Defence. The Central Organisation ECHS, based in Delhi, functions through the Adjutant General's Branch of the Integrated Headquarters of the Ministry of Defence (Army). Regional centres oversee polyclinics and empanelled health-care organisations in their respective areas.

The polyclinic is the usual first point of care. Services may include medical consultation, basic investigations, dental care, physiotherapy and dispensing of medicines. Cases requiring facilities unavailable at a polyclinic may be referred to service hospitals, government facilities or empanelled private hospitals and diagnostic centres. Treatment at private empanelled facilities is generally governed by package rates linked to the Central Government Health Scheme.

In 2025, the network comprised 30 regional centres and 456 polyclinics, including eight facilities in Nepal. Of the polyclinics, 129 were located near military medical facilities and 327 were classified as non-military polyclinics.

== Audits and challenges ==
The Comptroller and Auditor General of India (CAG) has conducted two major performance audits of ECHS. Its 2015 report, covering 2012–2015, examined whether the scheme was meeting its objectives and assessed staffing, infrastructure, medicine supply, referrals and online bill processing.

A second performance audit, tabled in Parliament in December 2025, covered the period from 2018–19 to 2022–23. It found inadequate and uneven geographical coverage of empanelled hospitals, which required some beneficiaries to travel long distances for specialised treatment. The audit also reported persistent manpower shortages, short supply of medicines at some polyclinics, deficiencies in equipment, ageing ambulances, problems with mobile medical units, and delays in hospital and reimbursement payments.

The Ministry of Defence told the auditors that it had simplified hospital empanelment procedures and expanded the network. It also sanctioned additional staff in November 2024 for 23 new polyclinics and the upgrading of 50 existing polyclinics.

== See also ==
- Department of Ex-Servicemen Welfare
- Central Government Health Scheme
- Military medicine in India
