= List of Param Vishisht Seva Medal recipients (2020–2029) =

The Param Vishisht Seva Medal (PVSM) (IAST: Parama Viśiṣṭa Sēvā, lit. 'supreme distinguished service medal') is the highest peacetime medal of the Indian Armed Forces, and is awarded for "distinguished service of the most exceptional order." The medal was instituted on Republic Day 1960 as the highest class of the Vishisht Seva Medal ("Distinguished Service Medal") intended to recognise "distinguished service rendered by personnel of the Armed Forces." All ranks of the Armed Forces are eligible for the medal, which may be awarded multiple times as well as posthumously.

At its creation, it was designated the Vishisht Seva Medal (Class I). On 27 January 1967, it received its present name. Post-nominals for recipients were approved on 19 August 1967.

== Recipients ==
No.	Rank	Name	Branch	Service Number (Unit)	Date of Award
1221	Lieutenant General	Ranbir Singh AVSM & bar YSM, SM	Indian Army	IC-39070P (Infantry)	26 January 2020
1222	Lieutenant General	Sanjeev Kumar Shrivastava AVSM	Indian Army	IC-39073H (Engineers)	26 January 2020
1223	Lieutenant General	Rajeev Chopra AVSM	Indian Army	IC-39130Y (Infantry)	26 January 2020
1224	Lieutenant General	Podali Shankar Rajeshwar AVSM VSM	Indian Army	IC-39380A (Artillery)	26 January 2020
1225	Lieutenant General	Satinder Kumar Saini AVSM YSM VSM	Indian Army	IC-39436F (Infantry)	26 January 2020
1226	Lieutenant General	Amarjeet Singh Bedi UYSM YSM VSM	Indian Army	IC-39465W (Infantry)	26 January 2020
1227	Lieutenant General	Anil Chauhan UYSM AVSM SM VSM	Indian Army	IC-39492A (Infantry)	26 January 2020
1228	Lieutenant General	Jaiveer Singh Negi AVSM, YSM, VSM & bar	Indian Army	IC-39522M (Infantry)	26 January 2020
1229	Lieutenant General	Santosh Kumar Upadhya AVSM SM VSM	Indian Army	IC-39871W (Infantry)	26 January 2020
1230	Lieutenant General	Sanjeev Kanal AVSM	Indian Army	IC-40031H (Artillery)	26 January 2020
1231	Lieutenant General	Rajnikant Jagga AVSM VSM (Ret'd)	Indian Army	IC-40101W (Armoured Corps)	26 January 2020
1232	Lieutenant General	Alok Singh Kler VSM	Indian Army	IC-40293Y (Armoured Corps)	26 January 2020
1233	Lieutenant General	Ravendra Pal Singh AVSM VSM	Indian Army	IC-40302P (Mechanised Infantry)	26 January 2020
1234	Lieutenant General	Arvind Dutta AVSM VSM	Indian Army	IC-40382X (Infantry)	26 January 2020
1235	Lieutenant General	Harpal Singh AVSM VSM	Indian Army	IC-40703K (Engineers)	26 January 2020
1236	Lieutenant General	Dalip Singh VSM	Indian Army	IC-37882K (AOC)	26 January 2020
1237	Major General	Sandeepan Handa (Ret'd)	Indian Army	IC-40003W (AAC)	26 January 2020
1238	Major General	Mukesh Kumar SM	Indian Army	IC-40471W (Infantry)	26 January 2020
1239	Major General	Ashwani Kumar Channan SM	Indian Army	IC-41960N (Artillery)	26 January 2020
1240	Vice Admiral	Anil Kumar Chawla AVSM NM VSM	Indian Navy	02312-B	26 January 2020
1241	Vice Admiral	G. Ashok Kumar AVSM VSM	Indian Navy	02470-N	26 January 2020
1242	Vice Admiral	Atul Kumar Jain AVSM VSM	Indian Navy	02459-N	26 January 2020
1243	Air Marshal	Raj Karan Singh Shera AVSM VSM	Indian Air Force	16315 AE(E)	26 January 2020
1244	Air Marshal	Kuldeep Sharma AVSM VSM (Ret'd)	Indian Air Force	16541 AE(M)	26 January 2020
1245	Air Marshal	Harjit Singh Arora AVSM	Indian Air Force	16557 F(P)	26 January 2020
1246	Air Marshal	Surendra Kumar Ghotia VSM	Indian Air Force	16575 F(P)	26 January 2020
1247	Air Marshal	Rajiv Dayal Mathur AVSM VSM	Indian Air Force	16772 F(P)	26 January 2020
1248	Air Marshal	Pradeep Padmakar Bapat VSM	Indian Air Force	17227 (ADM)	26 January 2020
1249	Lieutenant General	Shashank Tarakant Upasani AVSM SM VSM	Indian Army	IC-39437K (Infantry)	26 January 2021
1250	Lieutenant General	Taranjit Singh AVSM, VSM & bar (Ret'd)	Indian Army	IC-39874K (Armoured Corps)	26 January 2021
1251	Lieutenant General	Saranjeet Singh UYSM YSM (Ret'd)	Indian Army	IC-39929H (Infantry)	26 January 2021
1252	Lieutenant General	Rajeev Sabherwal AVSM VSM (Ret'd)	Indian Army	IC-39996N (Signals)	26 January 2021
1253	Lieutenant General	Yenduru Venkata Krishna Mohan AVSM SM VSM (Ret'd)	Indian Army	IC-40007M (Infantry)	26 January 2021
1254	Lieutenant General	Anil Kumar Bhatt UYSM AVSM SM VSM (Ret'd)	Indian Army	IC-40022F (Infantry)	26 January 2021
1255	Lieutenant General	Gopal R UYSM AVSM SM (Ret'd)	Indian Army	IC-40235P (Infantry)	26 January 2021
1256	Lieutenant General	Sanjay Verma AVSM, VSM & bar (Ret'd)	Indian Army	IC-40299A (EME)	26 January 2021
1257	Lieutenant General	Chandi Prasad Mohanty AVSM SM VSM	Indian Army	IC-40314K (Infantry)	26 January 2021
1258	Lieutenant General	Asit Bhailal Mistry AVSM SM VSM	Indian Army	IC-40360Y (Infantry)	26 January 2021
1259	Lieutenant General	Raj Shukla YSM SM	Indian Army	IC-40685M (Artillery)	26 January 2021
1260	Lieutenant General	Vadlamani Shanmukha Sreenivas VSM & bar	Indian Army	IC-40760L (Infantry)	26 January 2021
1261	Lieutenant General	Kalisipudi Ravi Prasad VSM	Indian Army	IC-40948A (Artillery)	26 January 2021
1262	Lieutenant General	Harinder Singh AVSM YSM SM VSM	Indian Army	IC-41528M (Infantry)	26 January 2021
1263	Lieutenant General	Anup Banerji SM (Ret'd)	Indian Army	MR-04428K (AMC)	26 January 2021
1264	Lieutenant General	Sanjay Manohar Londhe SM (Ret'd)	Indian Army	DR-10359P (ADC)	26 January 2021
1265	Lieutenant General	Nardeep Naithani	Indian Army	MR-04745L (AMC)	26 January 2021
1266	Lieutenant General	Pailoor Ramachandran Venkatesh SM	Indian Army	V-00391W (RVC)	26 January 2021
1267	Major General	Alok Raj AVSM (Ret'd)	Indian Army	IC-41154F (Infantry)	26 January 2021
1268	Vice Admiral	Radhakrishnan Hari Kumar AVSM NM VSM	Indian Navy	02540-Y	26 January 2021
1269	Vice Admiral	Murlidhar Sadashiv Pawar AVSM VSM	Indian Navy	02483-T	26 January 2021
1270	Vice Admiral	Sishtla Rajasekhara Sarma AVSM VSM	Indian Navy	50832-A	26 January 2021
1271	Air Marshal	Navkaranjit Singh Dhillon AVSM	Indian Air Force	16580 F(P)	26 January 2021
1272	Air Marshal	Rajesh Kumar AVSM VM	Indian Air Force	16770 F(P)	26 January 2021
1273	Air Marshal	Arvindra Singh Butola VM VSM (Ret'd)	Indian Air Force	16789 F(P)	26 January 2021
1274	Air Marshal	Amit Tiwari AVSM VM	Indian Air Force	16806 F(P)	26 January 2021
1275	Air Marshal	Vivek Ram Chaudhari AVSM VM	Indian Air Force	16978 F(P)	26 January 2021
1276	Air Marshal	Mothlampet Sabari Gireesa Menon VSM	Indian Air Force	17035 (ADM)	26 January 2021
1277	Chief Engineer	K. P. Purushothaman VSM	Border Roads Organisation	GO-1968X	26 January 2021
1278	Director General	Krishnaswamy Natarajan PTM, TM	Indian Coast Guard	0091-E	26 January 2021
1279	Lieutenant General	Anant Prasad Singh AVSM (Ret'd)	Indian Army	IC-39501W (Army Air Defence)	26 January 2022
1280	Lieutenant General	Paramjit Singh Sangha UYSM AVSM SM (Ret'd)	Indian Army	IC-40353H (Infantry)	26 January 2022
1281	Lieutenant General	Yogesh Kumar Joshi UYSM AVSM VrC SM	Indian Army	IC-40500A (Infantry)	26 January 2022
1282	Lieutenant General	Manoj Pande AVSM VSM	Indian Army	IC-40716F (Engineers)	26 January 2022
1283	Lieutenant General	Manmohan Jeet Singh Kahlon AVSM	Indian Army	IC-40753P (Armoured Corps)	26 January 2022
1284	Lieutenant General	Jai Singh Nain AVSM SM	Indian Army	IC-41067N (Infantry)	26 January 2022
1285	Lieutenant General	Rajeev Sirohi UYSM AVSM VSM	Indian Army	IC-41072Y (Infantry)	26 January 2022
1286	Lieutenant General	Rakesh Kumar Anand AVSM SM VSM (Ret'd)	Indian Army	IC-41456N (Signals)	26 January 2022
1287	Lieutenant General	Surendar Kumar Prashar AVSM VSM (Ret'd)	Indian Army	IC-41471H (Infantry)	26 January 2022
1288	Lieutenant General	Kanwal Jeet Singh Dhillon UYSM YSM VSM	Indian Army	IC-41509F (Infantry)	26 January 2022
1289	Lieutenant General	Savneet Singh YSM SM VSM	Indian Army	IC-42475L (Infantry)	26 January 2022
1290	Lieutenant General	Sanjiv Rai AVSM SM VSM	Indian Army	IC-43686A (Infantry)	26 January 2022
1291	Lieutenant General	Manik Kumar Das SM & bar, VSM	Indian Army	IC-43842Y (Infantry)	26 January 2022
1292	Lieutenant General	Sukhdeep Sangwan AVSM, SM & bar (Ret'd)	Indian Army	IC-45009F (Infantry)	26 January 2022
1293	Lieutenant General	Joy Chatterjee VSM (Ret'd)	Indian Army	MR-04744H (AMC)	26 January 2022
1294	Lieutenant General	Madhuri Kanitkar AVSM VSM (Ret'd)	Indian Army	MR-05596P (AMC)	26 January 2022
1295	Lieutenant General	Nanda Kishore Sahoo VSM	Indian Army	DR-10339F (ADC)	26 January 2022
1296	Major General	Shailjanand Jha VSM (Ret'd)	Indian Army	IC-42294A (Armoured Corps)	26 January 2022
1297	Subedar	Neeraj Chopra VSM	Indian Army	JC-471869A (Infantry - 4 Rajputana Rifles)	26 January 2022
1298	Vice Admiral	Ajendra Bahadur Singh AVSM VSM	Indian Navy	02619-A	26 January 2022
1299	Vice Admiral	Ravneet Singh AVSM NM	Indian Navy	02646-N	26 January 2022
1300	Vice Admiral	Satishkumar Namdeo Ghormade AVSM NM	Indian Navy	02671-W	26 January 2022
1301	Air Marshal	Amit Dev AVSM VSM	Indian Air Force	16972 F(P)	26 January 2022
1302	Air Marshal	Manavendra Singh AVSM VrC VSM	Indian Air Force	16983 F(P)	26 January 2022
1303	Air Marshal	Sandeep Singh AVSM VM	Indian Air Force	17312 F(P)	26 January 2022
1304	Air Marshal	Balabhadra Radha Krishna AVSM SC	Indian Air Force	17326 F(P)	26 January 2022
1305	Air Marshal	Diptendu Choudhury AVSM VM VSM (Ret'd)	Indian Air Force	17335-L F(P)	26 January 2022
1306	Air Marshal	Shashiker Choudhary AVSM VSM	Indian Air Force	17645 AE(M)	26 January 2022
1307	Air Marshal	Vijay Pal Singh Rana VSM	Indian Air Force	17736 (ADM)	26 January 2022
1308	Lieutenant General	Milind N. Bhurke AVSM VSM (Ret'd)	Indian Army	IC-40534N (Signals)	26 January 2023
1309	Lieutenant General	Amardeep Singh Bhinder AVSM VSM	Indian Army	IC-41083L (Armoured Corps)	26 January 2023
1310	Lieutenant General	Shashank Shekhar Mishra AVSM VSM (Ret'd)	Indian Army	IC-41091K (Infantry)	26 January 2023
1311	Lieutenant General	Yogendra Dimri AVSM VSM	Indian Army	IC-41461Y (Engineers)	26 January 2023
1312	Lieutenant General	Ajai Singh AVSM	Indian Army	IC-41465P (Armoured Corps)	26 January 2023
1313	Lieutenant General	Nav Kumar Khanduri AVSM VSM	Indian Army	IC-41495M (Army Air Defence)	26 January 2023
1314	Lieutenant General	Harsha Gupta UYSM AVSM YSM VSM (Ret'd)	Indian Army	IC-41521H (Infantry)	26 January 2023
1315	Lieutenant General	Ravindra Kumar Singh Kushwaha AVSM (Ret'd)	Indian Army	IC-41599N (AOC)	26 January 2023
1316	Lieutenant General	Codanda Poovaiah Cariappa AVSM SM VSM	Indian Army	IC-41858L (Infantry)	26 January 2023
1317	Lieutenant General	Shantanu Dayal UYSM AVSM SM VSM (Ret'd)	Indian Army	IC-41860H (Infantry)	26 January 2023
1318	Lieutenant General	Tarun Kumar Chawla AVSM	Indian Army	IC-41912N (Artillery)	26 January 2023
1319	Lieutenant General	Rana Pratap Kalita UYSM AVSM SM VSM	Indian Army	IC-42004X (Infantry)	26 January 2023
1320	Lieutenant General	Anil Puri AVSM SM VSM	Indian Army	IC-42288M (Engineers)	26 January 2023
1321	Lieutenant General	Raju Somashekar Baggavalli UYSM AVSM YSM	Indian Army	IC-42389A (Infantry)	26 January 2023
1322	Lieutenant General	Channira Bansi Ponnapa AVSM VSM	Indian Army	IC-42753N (Infantry)	26 January 2023
1323	Lieutenant General	Vijay Kumar Mishra AVSM	Indian Army	IC-43296X (Infantry)	26 January 2023
1324	Lieutenant General	Jyotinder Singh Sandhu AVSM	Indian Army	IC-43354W (Armoured Corps)	26 January 2023
1325	Lieutenant General	Pradeep Chandran Nair AVSM YSM	Indian Army	IC-43472K (Infantry)	26 January 2023
1326	Lieutenant General	Rajinder Dewan AVSM VSM	Indian Army	IC-43877P (Infantry)	26 January 2023
1327	Vice Admiral	Ravindra Bhartruhari Pandit AVSM	Indian Navy	02746-R	26 January 2023
1328	Vice Admiral	Biswajit Dasgupta AVSM YSM VSM	Indian Navy	02782-Y	26 January 2023
1329	Vice Admiral	Makarand Aravind Hampiholi AVSM NM	Indian Navy	02859-Y	26 January 2023
1330	Air Marshal	Suraj Kumar Jha AVSM	Indian Air Force	17445 F(P)	26 January 2023
1331	Air Marshal	Amar Preet Singh AVSM	Indian Air Force	17695 F(P)	26 January 2023
1332	Air Marshal	Sandesh Prabhakar Wagle VM (Ret'd)	Indian Air Force	17710 F(P)	26 January 2023
1333	Air Marshal	Sujeet Pushpakar Dharkar AVSM	Indian Air Force	17841 F(P)	26 January 2023
1334	Air Marshal	Pankaj Mohan Sinha AVSM VSM	Indian Air Force	17842 F(P)	26 January 2023
1335	Air Marshal	Krishnaswamy Anantharaman VSM	Indian Air Force	17882 ADM	26 January 2023
1336	Director General	Virender Singh Pathania PTM, TM	Indian Coast Guard	0137-L	26 January 2023
1337	Lieutenant General	Basant Kumar Repswal AVSM VSM	Indian Army	IC-42273K (ASC)	26 January 2024
1338	Lieutenant General	Upendra Dwivedi AVSM	Indian Army	IC-42298W (Infantry)	26 January 2024
1339	Lieutenant General	Ajai Kumar Singh AVSM YSM SM VSM	Indian Army	IC-42336F (Infantry)	26 January 2024
1340	Lieutenant General	Surinder Singh Mahal AVSM VSM (Ret'd)	Indian Army	IC-42387P (Armoured Corps)	26 January 2024
1341	Lieutenant General	Madhavan Unnikrishnan Nair AVSM SM	Indian Army	IC-42390P (Signals)	26 January 2024
1342	Lieutenant General	M. V. Suchindra Kumar AVSM, YSM & bar, VSM	Indian Army	IC-42794X (Infantry)	26 January 2024
1343	Lieutenant General	N. S. Raja Subramani AVSM SM VSM	Indian Army	IC-43245K (Infantry)	26 January 2024
1344	Lieutenant General	Kulbhushan Hanumant Gawas VSM	Indian Army	IC-43252A (Signals)	26 January 2024
1345	Lieutenant General	Arun Ananthanarayan YSM SM VSM	Indian Army	IC-43262K (Infantry)	26 January 2024
1346	Lieutenant General	Devendra Pratap Pandey UYSM AVSM VSM	Indian Army	IC-43285L (Infantry)	26 January 2024
1347	Lieutenant General	Ravin Khosla UYSM AVSM SM VSM (Ret'd)	Indian Army	IC-43295P (Infantry)	26 January 2024
1348	Lieutenant General	Johnson P Mathew UYSM AVSM VSM	Indian Army	IC-43370N (Infantry)	26 January 2024
1349	Lieutenant General	P Gopalakrishna Menon UYSM AVSM	Indian Army	IC-43444X (Infantry)	26 January 2024
1350	Lieutenant General	Jagdish Baliram Chaudhari SM VSM	Indian Army	IC-43684P (Mechanised Infantry)	26 January 2024
1351	Lieutenant General	Tarun Kumar Aich AVSM	Indian Army	IC-43710L (Infantry)	26 January 2024
1352	Lieutenant General	Mohan Subramanian AVSM SM VSM	Indian Army	IC-43771H (Army Air Defence)	26 January 2024
1353	Lieutenant General	Samir Gupta VSM	Indian Army	IC-43796P (Artillery)	26 January 2024
1354	Lieutenant General	Gurbipal Singh AVSM VSM	Indian Army	IC-44504N (Infantry)	26 January 2024
1355	Lieutenant General	Ashok Kumar Jindal AVSM YSM (Ret'd)	Indian Army	MR-04902M (AMC)	26 January 2024
1356	Lieutenant General	Ajith Nilakantan	Indian Army	MR-05712M (AMC)	26 January 2024
1357	Major General	Hariharan Dharmarajan AVSM, SM & bar, VSM	Indian Army	IC-44038K (Engineers)	26 January 2024
1358	Major General	Ravi Murugan AVSM	Indian Army	IC-44473Y (Mechanised Infantry)	26 January 2024
1359	Vice Admiral	Dinesh Kumar Tripathi AVSM NM	Indian Navy	02904-Z	26 January 2024
1360	Vice Admiral	Sandeep Naithani AVSM VSM (Ret'd)	Indian Navy	50884-W	26 January 2024
1361	Vice Admiral	Sanjay Mahindru AVSM NM (Ret'd)	Indian Navy	02797-F	26 January 2024
1362	Air Marshal	Chalapati Jonnalagada AVSM VSM	Indian Air Force	17358 F(P)	26 January 2024
1363	Air Marshal	Vibhas Pande AVSM VSM	Indian Air Force	17647 AE(M)	26 January 2024
1364	Air Marshal	Vikram Singh AVSM VM (Ret'd)	Indian Air Force	17699 F(P)	26 January 2024
1365	Air Marshal	Bavisetti Chandra Sekhar AVSM (Ret'd)	Indian Air Force	17726 F(P)	26 January 2024
1366	Air Marshal	Radhakrishnan Radhish AVSM VM	Indian Air Force	17853 F(P)	26 January 2024
1367	Air Marshal	Ravi Gopal Krishna Kapoor AVSM VM	Indian Air Force	18253 F(P)	26 January 2024
1368	Lieutenant General	Paramjit Singh Minhas AVSM (Ret'd)	Indian Army	IC-43218A (Armoured Corps)	26 January 2025
1369	Lieutenant General	Karanbir Singh Brar AVSM	Indian Army	IC-43667P (Armoured Corps)	26 January 2025
1370	Lieutenant General	Manoj Kumar Katiyar AVSM	Indian Army	IC-43725N (Infantry)	26 January 2025
1371	Lieutenant General	Adosh Kumar AVSM SM	Indian Army	IC-43746K (Artillery)	26 January 2025
1372	Lieutenant General	Dhiraj Seth AVSM	Indian Army	IC-44044X (Armoured Corps)	26 January 2025
1373	Lieutenant General	Preet Mohindera Singh VSM (Ret'd)	Indian Army	IC-44239H (ASC)	26 January 2025
1374	Lieutenant General	Ram Chander Tiwari UYSM AVSM SM	Indian Army	IC-44498L (Infantry)	26 January 2025
1375	Lieutenant General	Anindya Sengupta UYSM AVSM YSM	Indian Army	IC-44545X (Infantry)	26 January 2025
1376	Lieutenant General	Raghu Srinivasan VSM	Indian Army	IC-44552N (Engineers)	26 January 2025
1377	Lieutenant General	Vivek Kashyap AVSM VSM	Indian Army	IC-44603W (Armoured Corps)	26 January 2025
1378	Lieutenant General	Devendra Sharma AVSM SM	Indian Army	IC-47003Y (Armoured Corps)	26 January 2025
1379	Lieutenant General	Padam Singh Shekhawat AVSM SM	Indian Army	IC-47004F (Mechanised Infantry)	26 January 2025
1380	Lieutenant General	Dinesh Singh Rana AVSM YSM SM	Indian Army	IC-47020Y (Infantry)	26 January 2025
1381	Lieutenant General	Pratik Sharma AVSM SM	Indian Army	IC-47032N (Infantry)	26 January 2025
1382	Lieutenant General	Amardeep Singh Aujla UYSM YSM SM VSM	Indian Army	IC-47261Y (Infantry)	26 January 2025
1383	Lieutenant General	V. M. Bhuvana Krishnan AVSM YSM	Indian Army	IC-47566Y (Infantry)	26 January 2025
1384	Lieutenant General	Raghavachari Santhana Raman AVSM YSM	Indian Army	IC-48681L (Infantry)	26 January 2025
1385	Lieutenant General	Vineet Gaur AVSM	Indian Army	IC-49349F (EME)	26 January 2025
1386	Lieutenant General	Shankar Narayan NM VSM	Indian Army	MR-05533M (AMC)	26 January 2025
1387	Brigadier	Sanjay Kumar Mishra AVSM, SM & bar, VSM & bar	Indian Army	MR-06750P (AMC)	26 January 2025
1388	Vice Admiral	Sanjay Jasjit Singh AVSM NM	Indian Navy	03081-A	26 January 2025
1389	Vice Admiral	Rajesh Sudhakar Pendharkar AVSM VSM	Indian Navy	03130-N	26 January 2025
1390	Vice Admiral	Suraj Berry AVSM NM VSM	Indian Navy	03101-Y	26 January 2025
1391	Vice Admiral	Srinivas Vennam AVSM NM	Indian Navy	03227-H	26 January 2025
1392	Air Marshal	Narmdeshwar Tiwari AVSM VM	Indian Air Force	18270 F(P)	26 January 2025
1393	Air Marshal	Balakrishnan Manikantan AVSM VM	Indian Air Force	18291 F(P)	26 January 2025
1394	Air Marshal	Chakalayil Rajappa Mohan AVSM VSM (Ret'd)	Indian Air Force	18517 AE(E)	26 January 2025
1395	Air Marshal	Nagesh Kapoor AVSM VM	Indian Air Force	18557 F(P)	26 January 2025
1396	Air Marshal	Rajesh Kumar Anand VSM (Ret'd)	Indian Air Force	18892 ADM	26 January 2025
1397	Air Marshal	Saju Balakrishnan AVSM VM	Indian Air Force	18300 F(P)	26 January 2025

== See also ==
- List of Param Vishisht Seva Medal recipients (1960–1969)
- List of Param Vishisht Seva Medal recipients (1970–1979)
- List of Param Vishisht Seva Medal recipients (1980–1989)
- List of Param Vishisht Seva Medal recipients (1990–1999)
- List of Param Vishisht Seva Medal recipients (2000–2009)
- List of Param Vishisht Seva Medal recipients (2010–2019)
