= List of Param Vishisht Seva Medal recipients (2000–2009) =

The Param Vishisht Seva Medal (PVSM) (IAST: Parama Viśiṣṭa Sēvā, lit. 'supreme distinguished service medal') is the highest peacetime medal of the Indian Armed Forces, and is awarded for "distinguished service of the most exceptional order." The medal was instituted on Republic Day 1960 as the highest class of the Vishisht Seva Medal ("Distinguished Service Medal") intended to recognise "distinguished service rendered by personnel of the Armed Forces." All ranks of the Armed Forces are eligible for the medal, which may be awarded multiple times as well as posthumously.

At its creation, it was designated the Vishisht Seva Medal (Class I). On 27 January 1967, it received its present name. Post-nominals for recipients were approved on 19 August 1967.

== Recipients ==
No.	Rank	Name	Branch	Service Number (Unit)	Date of Award
667	Lieutenant General	Shailendra Kumar Bhatnagar AVSM	Indian Army	IC-12405 (AOC)	26 January 2000
668	Lieutenant General	Malik Ram Sharma VSM	Indian Army	IC-12508 (Infantry)	26 January 2000
669	Lieutenant General	Dharambir Singh AVSM	Indian Army	IC-12552 (EME)	26 January 2000
670	Lieutenant General	Yuvraj Kumar Mehta AVSM	Indian Army	IC-7013 (Engineers)	26 January 2000
671	Lieutenant General	Hind Ravi Singh Mann AVSM	Indian Army	IC-12813 (Infantry)	26 January 2000
672	Lieutenant General	Sudhir Kumar	Indian Army	IC-12850 (Signals)	26 January 2000
673	Lieutenant General	Prakash Gokarn AVSM	Indian Army	IC-12855 (Signals)	26 January 2000
674	Lieutenant General	Jitendra Swarup Bhatnagar AVSM VSM	Indian Army	IC-13021 (Army Service Corps)	26 January 2000
675	Lieutenant General	Malvinder Singh Shergill AVSM VrC	Indian Army	IC-13152 (Armoured Corps)	26 January 2000
676	Lieutenant General	Surinder Bir Singh Kochar AVSM	Indian Army	IC-13247 (Infantry)	26 January 2000
677	Lieutenant General	Satish Chandra Chopra AVSM VSM	Indian Army	IC-13963 (Infantry)	26 January 2000
678	Lieutenant General	Harjinder Singh Bagga VSM	Indian Army	IC-13969 (Infantry)	26 January 2000
679	Lieutenant General	Amarjit Singh	Indian Army	IC-12827 (EME)	26 January 2000
680	Lieutenant General	Ramanand Jayaswal	Indian Army	MR-01515 (AMC)	26 January 2000
681	Lieutenant General	Satish Chandra Verma	Indian Army	MR-02482 (AMC)	26 January 2000
682	Vice Admiral	Ravindra Nath Ganesh AVSM NM	Indian Navy	00523-N	26 January 2000
683	Surgeon Vice Admiral	Jagdish Chandra Sharma VSM	Indian Navy	75524-W	26 January 2000
684	Surgeon Vice Admiral	Pramod Chandra Bhasin AVSM VSM	Indian Navy	50155-N	26 January 2000
685	Air Marshal	Pran Nath Bajaj AVSM	Indian Air Force	6392 AE(M)	26 January 2000
686	Air Marshal	Philip Rajkumar AVSM VM	Indian Air Force	6748 F(P)	26 January 2000
687	Air Marshal	Satish Govind Inamdar VSM	Indian Air Force	7189 F(P)	26 January 2000
688	Air Marshal	Sahab Prasad Varma VSM	Indian Air Force	6466 (Medical)	26 January 2000
689	Air Marshal	Sayyid Shahid Hussein Naqvi AVSM VrC	Indian Air Force	7193 F(P)	26 January 2000
690	Air Marshal	Thrunillayi Ramaswamy Janakiraman AVSM	Indian Air Force	7058 AE(M)	26 January 2000
691	Lieutenant General	Ashok Kumar Puri AVSM	Indian Army	IC-12326 (Engineers)	26 January 2001
692	Lieutenant General	Madan Pal Singh Bhandari VSM	Indian Army	IC-12581 (Artillery)	26 January 2001
693	Lieutenant General	Avtar Singh	Indian Army	IC-12909 (Artillery)	26 January 2001
694	Lieutenant General	Cadambi Ramaswamy Sampath Kumar AVSM VSM	Indian Army	IC-13027 (Artillery)	26 January 2001
695	Lieutenant General	Rajendra Singh Kadyan AVSM VSM	Indian Army	IC-13153 (Infantry)	26 January 2001
696	Lieutenant General	Bhupal Singh Malik AVSM (Ret'd)	Indian Army	IC-13198 (Infantry)	26 January 2001
697	Lieutenant General	Vijay Lall AVSM	Indian Army	IC-13306 (AOC)	26 January 2001
698	Lieutenant General	Adusumilli Seshagiri Rao AVSM	Indian Army	IC-13385 (Infantry)	26 January 2001
699	Lieutenant General	Mohan Anand Gurbaxani AVSM	Indian Army	IC-13633 (Infantry)	26 January 2001
700	Lieutenant General	Shankar Prasad VSM	Indian Army	IC-13642 (Infantry)	26 January 2001
701	Lieutenant General	Shamsher Singh Mehta AVSM & bar VSM	Indian Army	IC-13898 (Armoured Corps)	26 January 2001
702	Lieutenant General	Gurpreet Singh	Indian Army	IC-13194 (Infantry)	26 January 2001
703	Lieutenant General	Virendra Kuar Sewal	Indian Army	IC-13947 (Armoured Corps)	26 January 2001
704	Lieutenant General	Inder Kumar Chhitwal	Indian Army	IC-14145 (Army Service Corps)	26 January 2001
705	Lieutenant General	Gurbaksh Singh Sihota AVSM VrC VM	Indian Army	IC-15471 (Artillery)	26 January 2001
706	Lieutenant General	Arjun Singh Khanna AVSM VrC	Indian Army	IC-15511 (Artillery)	26 January 2001
707	Lieutenant General	John Ranjan Mukherjee AVSM VSM	Indian Army	IC-15795 (Infantry)	26 January 2001
708	Vice Admiral	Rajeshwar Nath AVSM VSM	Indian Navy	40175-F	26 January 2001
709	Vice Admiral	Harinder Singh AVSM	Indian Navy	00531-F	26 January 2001
710	Vice Admiral	John Colin De Silva AVSM	Indian Navy	00556-N	26 January 2001
711	Air Marshal	Prakash Sadashivrao Pingale AVSM VrC VM	Indian Air Force	6755 F(P)	26 January 2001
712	Air Marshal	Teshter Jall Master AVSM	Indian Air Force	7224 F(P)	26 January 2001
713	Air Marshal	Khurshinder Singh Bindra AVSM VM	Indian Air Force	6863 F(P)	26 January 2001
714	Air Vice Marshal	Surender Singh Chauhan AVSM VSM	Indian Air Force	7853 AE(M)	26 January 2001
715	Air Vice Marshal	Gulshan Kumar Kawatra AVSM VSM	Indian Air Force	8001 AE(M)	26 January 2001
716	Lieutenant General	Sarab Jot Singh Saighal VM VSM	Indian Army	IC-13244 (Artillery)	26 January 2002
717	Lieutenant General	Ravindra Mohan Chadha AVSM	Indian Army	IC-13129 (Engineers)	26 January 2002
718	Lieutenant General	Surendra Kumar Jain AVSM VSM	Indian Army	IC-13954 (EME)	26 January 2002
719	Lieutenant General	Onkar Singh Lochhab AVSM VSM	Indian Army	IC-14531 (Infantry)	26 January 2002
720	Lieutenant General	Gopal Krishan Duggal AVSM VrC	Indian Army	IC-14541 (Infantry)	26 January 2002
721	Lieutenant General	Dattatray Balajirao Shekatkar AVSM VSM	Indian Army	IC-14765 (Infantry)	26 January 2002
722	Lieutenant General	Tejinder Singh Shergill	Indian Army	IC-15786 (Armoured Corps)	26 January 2002
723	Lieutenant General	Vijay Kumar Kapoor	Indian Army	IC-15861 (Armoured Corps)	26 January 2002
724	Lieutenant General	Arjun Ray VSM	Indian Army	IC-15938 (Mechanised Infantry)	26 January 2002
725	Lieutenant General	Ravinder Kumar Jetley VSM	Indian Army	MR-01652 (AMC)	26 January 2002
726	Lieutenant General	Harcharan Singh	Indian Army	MR-01987 (AMC)	26 January 2002
727	Vice Admiral	Arun Prakash AVSM VrC VSM	Indian Navy	00590-R	26 January 2002
728	Vice Admiral	Raman Puri AVSM VSM	Indian Navy	00604-Y	26 January 2002
729	Vice Admiral	Madan Jit Singh AVSM	Indian Navy	00614-W	26 January 2002
730	Surgeon Vice Admiral	Hara Prasad Mukherjee AVSM VSM	Indian Navy	75091-K	26 January 2002
731	Air Marshal	Sriperumbudur Raghavan AVSM VSM (Ret'd)	Indian Air Force	6710 (LGS)	26 January 2002
732	Air Marshal	Manjit Singh Sekhon VrC SC VM	Indian Air Force	6756 F(P)	26 January 2002
733	Air Marshal	Proteep Kumar Ghosh AVSM VSM (Ret'd)	Indian Air Force	7106 AE (E)	26 January 2002
734	Air Marshal	Michael McMahon AVSM VM	Indian Air Force	7399 F(P)	26 January 2002
735	Air Marshal	Teja Mohan Asthana AVSM VM	Indian Air Force	7672 F(P)	26 January 2002
736	Air Marshal	Manek Bomanshaw Madon AVSM VM & bar	Indian Air Force	7681 F(P)	26 January 2002
737	Lieutenant General	Tejinder Jit Singh Gill	Indian Army	IC-15201 (Artillery)	26 January 2003
738	Lieutenant General	Ananthanarayan Natarajan AVSM VSM	Indian Army	IC-15464 (Artillery)	26 January 2003
739	Lieutenant General	Prakash Suri	Indian Army	IC-15025 (Engineers)	26 January 2003
740	Lieutenant General	Dharam Parkash Sehgal AVSM VSM	Indian Army	IC-15403 (Signals)	26 January 2003
741	Lieutenant General	Bijoy Nandan Shahi AVSM VSM	Indian Army	MR-02562 (AMC)	26 January 2003
742	Lieutenant General	Sarvjit Singh Chahal AVSM VSM	Indian Army	IC-16240 (Infantry)	26 January 2003
743	Lieutenant General	Brij Mohan Kapur AVSM	Indian Army	IC-14385 (Armoured Corps)	26 January 2003
744	Lieutenant General	Kamaleshwar Davar AVSM	Indian Army	IC-14405 (Armoured Corps)	26 January 2003
745	Lieutenant General	Dinesh Singh Chauhan UYSM AVSM VSM	Indian Army	IC-13951 (Infantry)	26 January 2003
746	Lieutenant General	Mahesh Vij AVSM	Indian Army	IC-15787 (Infantry)	26 January 2003
747	Lieutenant General	Rajinder Kumar Mehta AVSM VSM	Indian Army	IC-14851 (EME)	26 January 2003
748	Lieutenant General	Naresh Chand	Indian Army	IC-15490 (Artillery)	26 January 2003
749	Lieutenant General	Hari Uniyal	Indian Army	IC-13971 (Engineers)	26 January 2003
750	Lieutenant General	Bhopinder Singh AVSM	Indian Army	IC-16272 (Infantry)	26 January 2003
751	Lieutenant General	Ashok Chaki AVSM SM VSM	Indian Army	IC-15915 (Infantry)	26 January 2003
752	Lieutenant General	Parinder Paul Singh Bindra AVSM VSM	Indian Army	IC-18964 (Infantry)	26 January 2003
753	Lieutenant General	Vijay Kumar Dua AVSM VSM	Indian Army	IC-15041 (Engineers)	26 January 2003
754	Lieutenant General	Narayan Chatterjee AVSM SM VSM	Indian Army	IC-15543 (Artillery)	26 January 2003
755	Lieutenant General	Roshan Lal Magotra VSM	Indian Army	IC-16176 (Signals)	26 January 2003
756	Vice Admiral	Om Prakash Bansal AVSM VSM	Indian Navy	00660-Z	26 January 2003
757	Vice Admiral	Pravesh Jaitly AVSM VSM	Indian Navy	50166-N	26 January 2003
758	Vice Admiral	Yashwant Prasad AVSM VSM	Indian Navy	00709-K	26 January 2003
759	Air Marshal	Adi Rustomji Ghandhi AVSM VrC	Indian Air Force	7722 F(P)	26 January 2003
760	Air Marshal	Dinesh Chandra Nigam AVSM VSM	Indian Air Force	7938 AE(E)	26 January 2003
761	Air Marshal	Satish Kumar Ramlal Dham AVSM VSM	Indian Air Force	8097 (Medical)	26 January 2003
762	Air Marshal	Shashindra Pal Tyagi AVSM VM	Indian Air Force	8130 F(P)	26 January 2003
763	Air Marshal	Ashok Kumar Goel AVSM VM	Indian Air Force	8151 F(P)	26 January 2003
764	Air Marshal	Vijay Achyut Patkar AVSM VSM	Indian Air Force	8632 AE(E)	26 January 2003
765	Lieutenant General	Ranjit Singh Nagra VSM	Indian Army	IC-15492 (Artillery)	26 January 2004
766	Lieutenant General	Shantonu Choudhry AVSM VSM	Indian Army	IC-15690 (Artillery)	26 January 2004
767	Lieutenant General	Arvind Kumar AVSM	Indian Army	IC-15831 (Armoured Corps)	26 January 2004
768	Lieutenant General	Jitendra Singh Varma AVSM	Indian Army	IC-16033 (Armoured Corps)	26 January 2004
769	Lieutenant General	Joginder Jaswant Singh AVSM VSM	Indian Army	IC-16078 (Infantry)	26 January 2004
770	Lieutenant General	Jai Bhagwan Singh Yadava AVSM VrC VSM	Indian Army	IC-16095 (Infantry)	26 January 2004
771	Lieutenant General	Hari Prasad AVSM VSM	Indian Army	IC-16109 (Infantry)	26 January 2004
772	Lieutenant General	Bhupinder Singh Thakur AVSM	Indian Army	IC-16234 (Armoured Corps)	26 January 2004
773	Lieutenant General	Vinayak Gopal Patankar UYSM VSM	Indian Army	IC-16313 (Artillery)	26 January 2004
774	Lieutenant General	Vijay Kumar Jetley UYSM	Indian Army	IC-16542 (Infantry)	26 January 2004
775	Lieutenant General	Balraj Singh Takhar VSM	Indian Army	IC-16543 (Armoured Corps)	26 January 2004
776	Lieutenant General	Gambhir Singh Negi AVSM VSM	Indian Army	IC-16545 (Infantry)	26 January 2004
777	Lieutenant General	Tej Pratap Singh Brar YSM	Indian Army	IC-16783 (Infantry)	26 January 2004
778	Lieutenant General	Mohinder Singh AVSM	Indian Army	IC-16838 (Infantry)	26 January 2004
779	Lieutenant General	Richard Khare AVSM SM VSM	Indian Army	IC-17240 (Infantry)	26 January 2004
780	Lieutenant General	Nirbhay Sharma AVSM VSM	Indian Army	IC-17244 (Infantry)	26 January 2004
781	Lieutenant General	Harbans Singh Kanwar AVSM VSM	Indian Army	IC-21254 (Infantry)	26 January 2004
782	Lieutenant General	Bittianda Cariappa Bopanna AVSM VSM	Indian Army	IC-22834 (Infantry)	26 January 2004
783	Major General	Anand Sagar Bhagat AVSM SM	Indian Army	IC-19029 (Signals)	26 January 2004
784	Major General	Manmohan Singh AVSM (Ret'd)	Indian Army	IC-16300 (Signals)	26 January 2004
785	Vice Admiral	Leslie Alexander Lowe AVSM VSM	Indian Navy	40202-T (Infantry)	26 January 2004
786	Vice Admiral	Srinivasa Varadachari Gopalachari AVSM VSM	Indian Navy	00713-W	26 January 2004
787	Vice Admiral	Satish Chandra Suresh Bangara AVSM	Indian Navy	00726-Z	26 January 2004
788	Air Marshal	Anil Kumar Trikha AVSM VSM (Ret'd)	Indian Air Force	8436 F(P)	26 January 2004
789	Air Marshal	Brijendra Mohan Bali AVSM VM	Indian Air Force	8438 F(P)	26 January 2004
790	Air Marshal	Bijoy Krishna Pandey AVSM VM	Indian Air Force	8990 F(P)	26 January 2004
791	Air Marshal	Narayan Menon UYSM AVSM	Indian Air Force	9005 F(P)	26 January 2004
792	Air Marshal	Raghu Rajan	Indian Air Force	8997 F(P)	26 January 2004
793	Air Marshal	Prakashchandra Khandubhai Desai AVSM VSM	Indian Air Force	10078 AE(M)	26 January 2004
794	Lieutenant General	Mathew Mammen AVSM VSM	Indian Army	IC-15792 (Engineers)	26 January 2005
795	Lieutenant General	Jagdish Chander AVSM VSM	Indian Army	IC-15931 (Army Service Corps)	26 January 2005
796	Lieutenant General	Charanjit Singh Chima	Indian Army	IC-16100 (Air Defence Artillery)	26 January 2005
797	Lieutenant General	Satish Bhalchandra Satpute AVSM (Ret'd)	Indian Army	IC-16139 (Infantry)	26 January 2005
798	Lieutenant General	Raghubir Singh Shahrawat AVSM VSM (Ret'd)	Indian Army	IC-16260 (AOC)	26 January 2005
799	Lieutenant General	Ramchandra Subramanyam	Indian Army	IC-16268 (Engineers)	26 January 2005
800	Lieutenant General	Virinder Kumar Dhir AVSM	Indian Army	IC-16567 (EME)	26 January 2005
801	Lieutenant General	Davinder Kumar VSM	Indian Army	IC-16582 (Signals)	26 January 2005
802	Lieutenant General	Krishnamurthy Nagaraj UYSM	Indian Army	IC-16620 (Infantry)	26 January 2005
803	Lieutenant General	Avtar Singh VSM	Indian Army	IC-16632 (Infantry)	26 January 2005
804	Lieutenant General	Rana Sudhir Kumar Kapur AVSM SM VSM	Indian Army	IC-16782 (Engineers)	26 January 2005
805	Lieutenant General	Padam Pal Singh Bhandari AVSM	Indian Army	IC-16818 (Armoured Corps)	26 January 2005
806	Lieutenant General	Mohinder Puri UYSM	Indian Army	IC-16907 (Infantry)	26 January 2005
807	Lieutenant General	Pramod Kumar Grover AVSM VSM	Indian Army	IC-17252 (Engineers)	26 January 2005
808	Lieutenant General	Amrik Singh Bahia AVSM	Indian Army	IC-17576 (Infantry)	26 January 2005
809	Lieutenant General	Ashok Kapur VSM	Indian Army	IC-17699 (Infantry)	26 January 2005
810	Lieutenant General	Janak Raj Bhardwaj AVSM VSM	Indian Army	MR-02600 (AMC)	26 January 2005
811	Lieutenant General	Ramesh Chander Dhir	Indian Army	DR-10206 (ADC)	26 January 2005
812	Major General	Tej Krishen Kaul AVSM VSM	Indian Army	IC-28531 (Infantry)	26 January 2005
813	Vice Admiral	Sureesh Mehta AVSM	Indian Navy	00727-A	26 January 2005
814	Vice Admiral	Venkat Bharathan AVSM VSM	Indian Navy	00790-W	26 January 2005
815	Surgeon Vice Admiral	Vijay Kumar Singh AVSM VSM	Indian Navy	75111-F	26 January 2005
816	Air Marshal	Sunil Kumar Malik AVSM	Indian Air Force	9002 F(P)	26 January 2005
817	Air Marshal	Satish Kumar Jain AVSM VM	Indian Air Force	9716 F(P)	26 January 2005
818	Air Marshal	Subhash Bhojwani AVSM VSM	Indian Air Force	9734 F(P)	26 January 2005
819	Air Marshal	Ajit Bhavnani AVSM VM	Indian Air Force	10440 F(P)	26 January 2005
820	Air Marshal	Harendrajit Singh Garkal VSM	Indian Air Force	11780 (ADM)	26 January 2005
821	Air Marshal	Parimal Kumar Sarkar (Ret'd)	Indian Air Force	26480 (Medical)	26 January 2005
822	Lieutenant General	Bhopinder Singh AVSM VSM	Indian Army	IC-16289 (Infantry)	26 January 2006
823	Lieutenant General	Trevor Aloysius D'Cunha	Indian Army	IC-16309 (AOC)	26 January 2006
824	Lieutenant General	Vijay Kumar Chopra VSM & bar	Indian Army	IC-16338 (Artillery)	26 January 2006
825	Lieutenant General	Ranjit Singh SM	Indian Army	IC-16650 (Engineers)	26 January 2006
826	Lieutenant General	Arvind Sharma AVSM VSM	Indian Army	IC-16900 (Infantry)	26 January 2006
827	Lieutenant General	Anup Singh Jamwal AVSM & bar, VSM	Indian Army	IC-17206 (Artillery)	26 January 2006
828	Lieutenant General	Srinivasa Pattabhiraman AVSM SM VSM	Indian Army	IC-17210 (Engineers)	26 January 2006
829	Lieutenant General	Manikath Govindan Girish AVSM VSM	Indian Army	IC-17214 (EME)	26 January 2006
830	Lieutenant General	Charanjit Singh AVSM VSM	Indian Army	IC-17279 (Artillery)	26 January 2006
831	Lieutenant General	Vir Chand Jain AVSM, VSM & bar	Indian Army	IC-17280 (EME)	26 January 2006
832	Lieutenant General	Ravinder Nath Kapur AVSM & bar	Indian Army	IC-17291 (Infantry)	26 January 2006
833	Lieutenant General	Gurditar Singh AVSM	Indian Army	IC-17327 (Armoured Corps)	26 January 2006
834	Lieutenant General	Devraj Singh AVSM	Indian Army	IC-17594 (Infantry)	26 January 2006
835	Lieutenant General	Mohan Chandra Bhandari AVSM & bar	Indian Army	IC-17615 (Infantry)	26 January 2006
836	Lieutenant General	Kamal Krishna Khanna AVSM & bar	Indian Army	IC-17640 (Infantry)	26 January 2006
837	Lieutenant General	Arun Kumar Chopra AVSM	Indian Army	IC-17674 (Infantry)	26 January 2006
838	Lieutenant General	Madan Gopal AVSM & bar	Indian Army	IC-17733 (Infantry)	26 January 2006
839	Lieutenant General	Madan Lal Chawla VSM (Ret'd)	Indian Army	MR-02068 (AMC)	26 January 2006
840	Lieutenant General	Ramji Rai AVSM VSM (Ret'd)	Indian Army	MR-02064 (AMC)	26 January 2006
841	Vice Admiral	Datla Sai Prasad Varma AVSM VSM	Indian Navy	50199-N	26 January 2006
842	Vice Admiral	Sangram Singh Byce AVSM NM	Indian Navy	00883-F	26 January 2006
843	Vice Admiral	Arun Kumar Singh AVSM NM	Indian Navy	00876-R	26 January 2006
844	Vice Admiral	Vijay Swarup Mathur AVSM VSM	Indian Navy	60147-Y	26 January 2006
845	Air Marshal	Avinash Deodatta Joshi VM	Indian Air Force	10886 F(P)	26 January 2006
846	Air Marshal	Fali Homi Major AVSM SC VM	Indian Air Force	11442 F(P)	26 January 2006
847	Air Marshal	Padma Bandopadhyay AVSM VSM	Indian Air Force	11528 (Medical)	26 January 2006
848	Air Marshal	Avdesh Kumar Singh AVSM VM VSM	Indian Air Force	11005 F(P)	26 January 2006
849	Air Marshal	Jaspal Singh Gujral VM VSM	Indian Air Force	11300 F(P)	26 January 2006
850	Air Marshal	Sharad Yeshwant Savur AVSM	Indian Air Force	10525 F(P)	26 January 2006
851	Lieutenant General	Bachittar Singh Dhaliwal AVSM VSM	Indian Army	IC-17239 (Engineers)	26 January 2007
852	Lieutenant General	Aditya Singh AVSM & bar	Indian Army	IC-17565 (Armoured Corps)	26 January 2007
853	Lieutenant General	Balbir Singh VSM & bar (Ret'd)	Indian Army	IC-17587 (Infantry)	26 January 2007
854	Lieutenant General	Deepak Kapoor AVSM SM VSM	Indian Army	IC-17622 (Artillery)	26 January 2007
855	Lieutenant General	Ashok Vasudeva AVSM VSM	Indian Army	IC-17631 (Artillery)	26 January 2007
856	Lieutenant General	Daljeet Singh AVSM VSM	Indian Army	IC-17644 (Armoured Corps)	26 January 2007
857	Lieutenant General	Devinder Dayal Singh Sandhu	Indian Army	IC-17759 (AOC)	26 January 2007
858	Lieutenant General	Kantamneni Sudhakar Rao SC SM	Indian Army	IC-19038 (Engineers)	26 January 2007
859	Lieutenant General	Kunwar Daulat Singh Shekhawat VSM	Indian Army	IC-19393 (Armoured Corps)	26 January 2007
860	Lieutenant General	Mohan Pande VSM	Indian Army	IC-19410 (Infantry)	26 January 2007
861	Lieutenant General	Chander Bhan Vijan	Indian Army	IC-19510 (Artillery)	26 January 2007
862	Lieutenant General	Randhir Kumar Mehta AVSM YSM VSM	Indian Army	IC-19550 (Infantry)	26 January 2007
863	Lieutenant General	Dilip Nemajirao Desai AVSM VSM	Indian Army	IC-19845 (Armoured Corps)	26 January 2007
864	Lieutenant General	Arvind Mahajan AVSM, VSM & bar	Indian Army	IC-19853 (EME)	26 January 2007
865	Lieutenant General	Ashok Kumar Saini AVSM SM	Indian Army	IC-24465 (Engineers)	26 January 2007
866	Lieutenant General	Utpal Bhattacharyya AVSM	Indian Army	IC-24528 (Engineers)	26 January 2007
867	Lieutenant General	Satyevir Yadav UYSM AVSM	Indian Army	IC-26838 (Infantry)	26 January 2007
868	Lieutenant General	Luxhmi Prakash Sadhotra AVSM	Indian Army	MR-03158 (AMC)	26 January 2007
869	Lieutenant General	Paramjit Singh AVSM, VSM & bar	Indian Army	DR-10267 (Dental)	26 January 2007
870	Vice Admiral	Jagjit Singh Bedi UYSM AVSM VSM	Indian Navy	01022-A	26 January 2007
871	Surgeon Vice Admiral	Punita Arora SM VSM (Ret'd)	Indian Navy	75894-K	26 January 2007
872	Air Marshal	Pramod Kumar Mehra AVSM VM	Indian Air Force	11581 F(P)	26 January 2007
873	Air Marshal	Bhushan Nilkant Gokhale AVSM VM	Indian Air Force	11630 F(P)	26 January 2007
874	Air Marshal	Padamjit Singh Ahluwalia AVSM & bar, VM, VSM	Indian Air Force	11631 F(P)	26 January 2007
875	Air Marshal	Arvind Kumar Nagalia AVSM VM VSM	Indian Air Force	11633 F(P)	26 January 2007
877	Air Marshal	Kirti Shekhar Chaturvedi VSM	Indian Air Force	12100 AE(E)	26 January 2007
878	Air Marshal	Balatikalandra Uthaiah Chengappa AVSM VSM (Ret'd)	Indian Air Force	12112 AE(E)	26 January 2007
879	Lieutenant General	Kuldip Singh Jamwal AVSM, VSM & bar	Indian Army	IC-19001 (Artillery)	26 January 2008
880	Lieutenant General	Om Prakash Nandrajog AVSM VSM	Indian Army	IC-19002 (Infantry)	26 January 2008
881	Lieutenant General	Ajeet Singh Bajwa AVSM VSM	Indian Army	IC-19004 (Artillery)	26 January 2008
882	Lieutenant General	Hardev Singh Lidder UYSM YSM VSM	Indian Army	IC-19009 (Infantry)	26 January 2008
883	Lieutenant General	Parmendra Kumar Singh AVSM	Indian Army	IC-19050 (Artillery)	26 January 2008
884	Lieutenant General	Milan Lalitkumar Naidu AVSM YSM	Indian Army	IC-19077 (Infantry)	26 January 2008
885	Lieutenant General	Susheel Gupta AVSM YSM	Indian Army	IC-19080 (Infantry)	26 January 2008
886	Lieutenant General	Zameer Uddin Shah SM VSM	Indian Army	IC-19429 (Artillery)	26 January 2008
887	Lieutenant General	Sudhir Sharma AVSM YSM VSM	Indian Army	IC-19440 (Infantry)	26 January 2008
888	Lieutenant General	Harcharanjit Singh Panag AVSM	Indian Army	IC-19834 (Infantry)	26 January 2008
889	Lieutenant General	Thomas Mathew AVSM	Indian Army	IC-19848 (Infantry)	26 January 2008
890	Lieutenant General	Mandhata Singh YSM VSM	Indian Army	IC-19860 (Infantry)	26 January 2008
891	Lieutenant General	Sarabjit Singh Dhillon AVSM & bar, VSM	Indian Army	IC-19868 (Infantry)	26 January 2008
892	Lieutenant General	Puttammadam Rajah Gangadharan AVSM, VSM & bar	Indian Army	IC-19873 (Infantry)	26 January 2008
893	Lieutenant General	Sivasankara Pillai Sree Kumar AVSM	Indian Army	IC-19891 (Signals)	26 January 2008
894	Lieutenant General	Pitamber Kishore Rampal AVSM	Indian Army	IC-19931 (Infantry)	26 January 2008
895	Lieutenant General	Prakash Singh Chaudhary AVSM SM VSM	Indian Army	IC-23030 (Infantry)	26 January 2008
896	Lieutenant General	Paramjit Singh AVSM VSM	Indian Army	IC-23039 (Infantry)	26 January 2008
897	Lieutenant General	Saibal Mukherjee AVSM	Indian Army	MR-02753 (AMC)	26 January 2008
898	Vice Admiral	Nirmal Verma AVSM	Indian Navy	01139-N	26 January 2008
899	Vice Admiral	Birinder Singh Randhawa AVSM VSM	Indian Navy	40298-K	26 January 2008
900	Vice Admiral	Vijay Shankar AVSM	Indian Navy	01088-Y	26 January 2008
901	Air Marshal	Jal Krishan Gupta AVSM	Indian Air Force	12308 (Medical)	26 January 2008
902	Air Marshal	Ajit Vishwanath Vaidya VM	Indian Air Force	11848 F(P)	26 January 2008
903	Air Marshal	Gurnam Singh Chaudhry AVSM VSM	Indian Air Force	11870 F(P)	26 January 2008
904	Air Marshal	Pradeep Vasant Naik	Indian Air Force	12005 F(P)	26 January 2008
905	Air Marshal	Packiam Paul Rajkumar AVSM	Indian Air Force	12018 F(P)	26 January 2008
906	Air Marshal	Jayant Satchidanand Apte AVSM (Ret'd)	Indian Air Force	11900 AE(E)	26 January 2008
907	Air Marshal	Yeshwant Rao Rane AVSM VM	Indian Air Force	12210 F(P)	26 January 2008
908	Air Marshal	Pranab Kumar Barbora VM	Indian Air Force	12375 F(P)	26 January 2008
909	Lieutenant General	Baldev Singh Pawar AVSM (Ret'd)	Indian Army	IC-19391 (Artillery)	26 January 2009
910	Lieutenant General	Rama Ranjan Goswami (Ret'd)	Indian Army	IC-19422 (Engineers)	26 January 2009
911	Lieutenant General	Isaac John Koshy AVSM	Indian Army	IC-23011 (Artillery)	26 January 2009
912	Lieutenant General	Noble Thamburaj SM	Indian Army	IC-23276 (Engineers)	26 January 2009
913	Lieutenant General	Jayanta Kumar Mohanty UYSM SM VSM	Indian Army	IC-23291 (Infantry)	26 January 2009
914	Lieutenant General	Tej Kumar Sapru YSM	Indian Army	IC-23302 (Infantry)	26 January 2009
915	Lieutenant General	Rajender Singh SM VSM	Indian Army	IC-23928 (Infantry)	26 January 2009
916	Lieutenant General	Vijay Kumar Singh AVSM YSM	Indian Army	IC-24173 (Infantry)	26 January 2009
917	Lieutenant General	Prabodh Chandra Bhardwaj AVSM VrC SC VSM	Indian Army	IC-24178 (Infantry)	26 January 2009
918	Lieutenant General	Amarjeet Singh Sekhon AVSM YSM	Indian Army	IC-24208 (Infantry)	26 January 2009
919	Lieutenant General	Amar Nath Aul UYSM AVSM	Indian Army	IC-24255 (Infantry)	26 January 2009
920	Lieutenant General	Digambar Singh Bartwal	Indian Army	IC-24604 (Infantry)	26 January 2009
921	Lieutenant General	Avadhesh Prakash AVSM VSM	Indian Army	IC-24611 (Infantry)	26 January 2009
922	Lieutenant General	Rakesh Kumar Gupta	Indian Army	IC-24810 (Army Service Corps)	26 January 2009
923	Lieutenant General	Kulwant Singh Dogra AVSM & bar, VSM (Ret'd)	Indian Army	IC-28805 (Army Air Defence)	26 January 2009
924	Lieutenant General	Krishna Pillai Sankaranarayana Pillai Venugopal AVSM (Ret'd)	Indian Army	IC-32703 (EME)	26 January 2009
925	Lieutenant General	Yogendra Singh VSM	Indian Army	MR-02475 (AMC)	26 January 2009
926	Lieutenant General	Jayakrishnan Jayaram AVSM	Indian Army	MR-02669 (AMC)	26 January 2009
927	Lieutenant General	Narayan Mohanty AVSM VSM	Indian Army	V-00321 (RVC)	26 January 2009
928	Vice Admiral	Raman Prem Suthan AVSM VSM	Indian Navy	01137-H	26 January 2009
929	Vice Admiral	Sunil Krishnaji Damle AVSM NM VSM	Indian Navy	01168-B	26 January 2009
930	Vice Admiral	Brij Krishna Kaul AVSM (Ret'd)	Indian Navy	50272-B	26 January 2009
931	Vice Admiral	Rustom Framroze Contractor AVSM NM (Ret'd)	Indian Navy	01224-F	26 January 2009
932	Air Marshal	Kanwar Dalinderjit Singh AVSM	Indian Air Force	12403 F(P)	26 January 2009
933	Air Marshal	Sadasivan Radhakrishnan AVSM	Indian Air Force	12408 F(P)	26 January 2009
934	Air Marshal	Vinod Kumar Verma AVSM VM VSM (Ret'd)	Indian Air Force	11638 F(P)	26 January 2009
935	Air Marshal	Pradeep Vasant Naik	Indian Air Force	12005 F(P)	26 January 2008
936	Air Marshal	Shiv Kumar Bhan AVSM VM	Indian Air Force	12510 F(P)	26 January 2009
937	Air Marshal	Gautam Nayyar VSM	Indian Air Force	13024 AE(M)	26 January 2009
938	Air Marshal	Suresh Chand Mukul AVSM VM VSM	Indian Air Force	12930 F(P)	26 January 2009

== See also ==
- List of Param Vishisht Seva Medal recipients (1960–1969)
- List of Param Vishisht Seva Medal recipients (1970–1979)
- List of Param Vishisht Seva Medal recipients (1980–1989)
- List of Param Vishisht Seva Medal recipients (1990–1999)
- List of Param Vishisht Seva Medal recipients (2010–2019)
- List of Param Vishisht Seva Medal recipients (2020–2029)
