= List of Param Vishisht Seva Medal recipients (1970–1979) =

The Param Vishisht Seva Medal (PVSM) (IAST: Parama Viśiṣṭa Sēvā, lit. 'supreme distinguished service medal') is the highest peacetime medal of the Indian Armed Forces, and is awarded for "distinguished service of the most exceptional order." The medal was instituted on Republic Day 1960 as the highest class of the Vishisht Seva Medal ("Distinguished Service Medal") intended to recognise "distinguished service rendered by personnel of the Armed Forces." All ranks of the Armed Forces are eligible for the medal, which may be awarded multiple times as well as posthumously.

At its creation, it was designated the Vishisht Seva Medal (Class I). On 27 January 1967, it received its present name. Post-nominals for recipients were approved on 19 August 1967.

== Recipients ==
No.	Rank	Name	Branch	Service Number (Unit)	Date of Award
57	Lieutenant General	Ajit Singh	Indian Army	IC-344	26 January 1970
58	Lieutenant General	Jagjit Singh Aurora	Indian Army	IC-214	26 January 1970
59	Vice Admiral	Nilakanta Krishnan DSC	Indian Navy		26 January 1970
60	Major General	Mihirsingh Gehirsingh Hazari	Indian Army	IC-646	26 January 1970
61	Major General	Naveen Chand Rawlley AVSM MC	Indian Army	IC-525	26 January 1970
62	Major General	Sagat Singh	Indian Army	IC-4295	26 January 1970
63	Major General	Umrao Singh	Indian Army	IC-361	26 January 1970
64	Rear Admiral	Bansh Raj Singh	Indian Navy		26 January 1970
65	Air Vice Marshal	Ajit Nath	Indian Air Force	1666 (Medical)	26 January 1970
66	Lieutenant General	Ram Adhar Loomba	Indian Army	IC-347 (Engineers)	26 January 1971
67	Lieutenant General	Inder Dev Verma	Indian Army	IC-414 (Signals)	26 January 1971
68	Lieutenant General	Sailendra Nath Chatterjee MC	Indian Army	MR-152 (Medical)	26 January 1971
69	Lieutenant General	M. Balakrishna Menon	Indian Army	MR-147 (Medical)	26 January 1971
70	Vice Admiral	Jal Cursetji	Indian Navy		26 January 1971
71	Major General	Inder Singh	Indian Army	MR-174 (Medical)	26 January 1971
72	Major General	Kartar Singh	Indian Army	DR-10002 (Dental)	26 January 1971
73	Major General	Sri Kanth Korla DSO MC	Indian Army	IC-382	26 January 1971
74	Major General	Santokh Singh Padda	Indian Army	IC-699 (Armoured Corps)	26 January 1971
75	Major General	Premanghsu Chowdry	Indian Army	IC-902	26 January 1971
76	Rear Admiral	Balwant Singh	Indian Navy		26 January 1971
77	Air Vice Marshal	Madhukar Mallanah Srinagesh AVSM	Indian Air Force	1665 (Medical)	26 January 1971
78	Air Vice Marshal	Idris Latif	Indian Air Force	1804 GD (P)	26 January 1971
79	Air Commodore	Lal Singh Grewal AVSM VrC	Indian Air Force	2337 GD (P)	26 January 1971
80	Lieutenant General	Edgar George Pettengell MBE	Indian Army	IC-795	20 January 1972
81	Air Marshal	Hirendra Nath Chatterjee DFC	Indian Air Force	1620 GD(P)	20 January 1972
82	Major General	Harish Chandra Rai	Indian Army	IC-592	20 January 1972
83	Major General	Jack Frederick Ralph Jacob	Indian Army	IC-470	20 January 1972
84	Major General	Biswa Nath Sarkar	Indian Army	IC-1417	20 January 1972
85	Major General	Gurbaksh Singh	Indian Army	IC-630	20 January 1972
86	Major General	Dalbir Singh	Indian Army	IC-557	20 January 1972
87	Major General	Lachhman Singh Lehl VrC	Indian Army	IC-1461	20 January 1972
88	Major General	Narayanai Pillai Sankaran Nair	Indian Army	IC-2042 (Madras)	20 January 1972
89	Major General	Mohindar Singh Brar	Indian Army	IC-1528 (Artillery)	20 January 1972
90	Major General	Eustace D'Souza	Indian Army	IC-518 (Maratha)	20 January 1972
91	Major General	Kundan Singh	Indian Army	IC-1522 (Raj Rif)	20 January 1972
92	Major General	Suraj Prakash Malhotra	Indian Army	IC-1804 (Guards)	20 January 1972
93	Major General	Raizada Dev Raj Anand	Indian Army	IC-2097 (Armoured Corps)	20 January 1972
94	Major General	Rustom Framji Khambatta	Indian Army	IC-1047 (Artillery)	20 January 1972
95	Major General	Frank Dalton Larkins	Indian Army	IC-482 (Artillery)	20 January 1972
96	Brigadier (Honorary Major General)	Sujan Singh Uban AVSM (Ret'd)	Indian Army	IC-1003 (Artillery)	20 January 1972
97	Major General	Stanley Leslie Menezes SC	Indian Army	IC-540 (Grenadiers)	20 January 1972
98	Major General	Walter Anthony Gustave Pinto	Indian Army	IC-605 (Guards)	20 January 1972
99	Major General	Bejoy Mohan Bhattacharjea MVC	Indian Army	IC-1338 (Garhwal Rifles)	20 January 1972
100	Major General	Arun Kumar Biswas	Indian Army	IC-1185 (Army Ordnance Corps)	20 January 1972
101	Major General	Ved Parkash	Indian Army	MR-177 (Medical)	20 January 1972
102	Rear Admiral	Elenjikal Chandy Kuruvila AVSM	Indian Navy		20 January 1972
103	Captain (Acting Rear Admiral)	Shree Harilal Sarma	Indian Navy		20 January 1972
104	Rear Admiral	Bansh Raj Singh PVSM	Indian Navy		20 January 1972
105	Air Vice Marshal	Maurice Barker	Indian Air Force	1691 F(P)	20 January 1972
106	Air Vice Marshal	Satya Pal Shahi	Indian Air Force	1601 ADM	20 January 1972
107	Air Vice Marshal	Charandas Gurudas Devasher	Indian Air Force	1867 F(P)	20 January 1972
108	Air Vice Marshal	Devaiah Subia VrC	Indian Air Force	1866 F(P)	20 January 1972
109	Brigadier	Shabeg Singh AVSM	Indian Army	IC-778 (Gorkha Rifles)	20 January 1972
110	Commodore	Bishambar Nath Thapar	Indian Navy		20 January 1972
111	Commodore	Dorab Ratanshaw Mehta	Indian Navy		20 January 1972
112	Commodore	John Thomas Goslin Pereira AVSM	Indian Navy		20 January 1972
113	Air Commodore	Randhir Singh AVSM VrC	Indian Air Force	2135 F(P)	20 January 1972
114	Air Commodore	John Francis Lazaro VM	Indian Air Force	2944 F(P)	20 January 1972
115	Captain	Mohan Singh Grewal AVSM	Indian Navy		20 January 1972
116	Group Captain	Malcolm Shirley Dundas Wollen VM	Indian Air Force	3641 F(P)	20 January 1972
117	Group Captain	Peter Maynard Wilson VrC	Indian Air Force	3590 F(P)	20 January 1972
118	Group Captain	Chandra Kant Viswanath Gole AVSM	Indian Air Force	3652 F(P)	20 January 1972
119	Lieutenant General	Premindra Singh Bhagat VC	Indian Army	IC-267	26 January 1972
120	Lieutenant General	Jaswant Kishan Khanna MC	Indian Army	IC-264	26 January 1972
121	Lieutenant General	Har Prasad	Indian Army	IC-242	26 January 1972
122	Lieutenant General	Brij Lall Kapoor AVSM	Indian Army	MR-173 (Medical)	26 January 1972
123	Major General	Mohindra Nath Batra	Indian Army	IC-308 (Intelligence Corps)	26 January 1972
124	Major General	Syed Mahdi Hasnain	Indian Army	IC-2065 (Garhwal Rifles)	26 January 1972
125	Major General	Mohinder Singh	Indian Army	IC-1021 (Army Service Corps)	26 January 1972
126	Major General	Jonathan Reuben Samson	Indian Army	IC-887 (Engineers)	26 January 1972
127	Rear Admiral	Pritam Singh Mahindroo	Indian Navy		26 January 1972
128	Surgeon Rear Admiral	Harcharan Lal Bhatia AVSM MC	Indian Navy		26 January 1972
129	Air Vice Marshal	Bandi Sreeramulu Krishnarao	Indian Air Force	1727 F (P)	26 January 1972
130	Air Vice Marshal	Dadi Ardeshir Mehta	Indian Air Force	1625 F (N)	26 January 1972
131	Air Vice Marshal	Amolak Singh Rikhy	Indian Air Force	2024 A&SD	26 January 1972
132	Air Commodore	Chandrasekhar Rao Kurpad	Indian Air Force	2414 RAD	26 January 1972
133	Air Commodore	Mondan Bhaskaran	Indian Air Force	2761 ENG	26 January 1972
134	Major General	Ram Dharamdas Hira MVC	Indian Army	IC-2531 (Gorkha Rifles)	20 March 1972
135	Major General	Benjamin Franklin Gonsalves	Indian Army	IC-1884 (Artillery)	20 March 1972
136	Major General	Kotikalapudi Venkata Krishnarao	Indian Army	IC-1164 (Mahar Regiment)	20 March 1972
137	Major General	Prature Venkata Ramaniah	Indian Army	MR-183 (Medical)	20 March 1972
138	Rear Admiral	Vasudeva Anant Kamath	Indian Navy		20 March 1972
139	Lieutenant General	Daljit Singh Kalha	Indian Army	IC-615 (Army Service Corps)	26 January 1973
140	Major General	Satinder Singh	Indian Army	IC-444	26 January 1973
141	Major General	Madhav Rao Rajwade VSM MC	Indian Army	IC-658 (Engineers)	26 January 1973
142	Major General	Kumar Ranjit Singh	Indian Army	IC-1742 (Armoured Corps)	26 January 1973
143	Major General	Anil Krishna Barat	Indian Army	MR-196 (Medical)	26 January 1973
144	Major General	Trichinopoly Vadival Jagannathan AVSM	Indian Army	IC-556 (Engineers)	26 January 1973
145	Major General	Robert George Williams	Indian Army	IC-298 (Artillery)	26 January 1973
146	Major General	Srinivas Kumar Sinha	Indian Army	IC-1536	26 January 1973
147	Rear Admiral	Rabinder Nath Batra	Indian Navy		26 January 1973
148	Rear Admiral	Sarosh Jehangir Lalkaka	Indian Navy	60000N	26 January 1973
149	Rear Admiral	Kamalakar Laxman Kulkarni	Indian Navy	00008T	26 January 1973
150	Group Captain	Prabhu Datt Chopra	Indian Air Force	3497 ENG	26 January 1973
151	Lieutenant General	C. Sundara Rao	Indian Army	IC-2556 (EME)	26 January 1974
152	Lieutenant General	Mohan Lal Thapan	Indian Army	IC-286	26 January 1974
153	Air Marshal	Krishnamahari Narasimhan	Indian Air Force	2278 SIG	26 January 1974
154	Major General	T. N. P. Ramachandran Nayar	Indian Army	IC-1295	26 January 1974
155	Major General	Ravinder Nath Dogra	Indian Army	DR-10003 (Dental)	26 January 1974
156	Major General	K. Velayadhan Pillai	Indian Army	MR-242 (Medical)	26 January 1974
157	Surgeon Rear Admiral	J. N. Ghosh	Indian Navy		26 January 1974
158	Air Vice Marshal	Edul Jahangir Dhatigara KC	Indian Air Force	1899 F(P)	26 January 1974
159	Lieutenant General	Brijmohan Narain Das	Indian Army	IC-411 (Engineers)	26 January 1975
160	Lieutenant General	Mohinder Singh Sandhu	Indian Army	IC-813 (AOC)	26 January 1975
161	Air Marshal	Hrushikesh Moolgavkar MVC	Indian Air Force	1644 F(P)	26 January 1975
162	Major General	Manohar Sadashiv Patankar (Ret'd)	Indian Army	IC-1087 (Infantry)	26 January 1975
163	Major General	Raghunath Singh Hoon AVSM	Indian Army	MR-235 (Medical)	26 January 1975
164	Major General	Bhaskar Mahadevan AVSM	Indian Army	MR-245 (Medical)	26 January 1975
165	Major General	Ishwar Chand Katoch (Ret'd)	Indian Army	IC-631 (Infantry)	26 January 1975
166	Major General	Jasbir Singh Bawa AVSM	Indian Army	IC-438 (Engineers)	26 January 1975
167	Major General	Krishna Datt Vasishta (Ret'd)	Indian Army	IC-627 (Artillery)	26 January 1975
168	Major General	Amreek Singh (Ret'd)	Indian Army	IC-408 (Artillery)	26 January 1975
169	Major General	Harkesh Chandra Gahlaut	Indian Army	IC-911 (Infantry)	26 January 1975
170	Major General	Rajendra Prasad	Indian Army	IC-684 (Artillery)	26 January 1975
171	Major General	Shyam Sunder Kaul	Indian Army	IC-2798 (Infantry)	26 January 1975
172	Major General	Ranjit Lal Chopra	Indian Army	IC-3315 (Armoured Corps)	26 January 1975
173	Major General	Om Prakash Dutta AVSM	Indian Army	IC-857 (Engineers)	26 January 1975
174	Lieutenant General	Om Prakash Malhotra	Indian Army	IC-478 (Artillery)	26 January 1976
175	Lieutenant General	Abhimanyu Vohra	Indian Army	IC-829 (Infantry)	26 January 1976
176	Lieutenant General	Zorawar Chand Bakhshi MVC VrC VSM	Indian Army	IC-1510 (Infantry)	26 January 1976
177	Lieutenant General	Kehar Singh Garewal	Indian Army	IC-585 (Signals)	26 January 1976
178	Lieutenant General	Noble Adiseshiah AVSM	Indian Army	MR-254 (Medical)	26 January 1976
179	Lieutenant General	Gurbachan Singh	Indian Army	IC-1191 (Armoured Corps)	26 January 1976
180	Lieutenant General	Jagdiswar Singh Nakai	Indian Army	IC-926 (Artillery)	26 January 1976
181	Vice Admiral	Rajendra Tandon AVSM	Indian Navy	40000-H	26 January 1976
182	Air Marshal	Bawa Sampuran Singh Bedi AVSM	Indian Air Force	1795 AE(M)	26 January 1976
183	Major General	Krishan Chand Soni AVSM (Ret'd)	Indian Army	IC-2053 (Engineers)	26 January 1976
184	Major General	Bantval Ramamohan Prabhu (Ret'd)	Indian Army	IC-720 (Artillery)	26 January 1976
185	Major General	Paida Chandra Sekhara Reddy (Ret'd)	Indian Army	IC-1667 (Artillery)	26 January 1976
186	Major General	Vanic Minas	Indian Army	IC-2587 (EME)	26 January 1976
187	Major General	Ram Singh	Indian Army	IC-3198 (Infantry)	26 January 1976
188	Major General	Gurcharan Singh Sandhu	Indian Army	IC-3234 (Armoured Corps)	26 January 1976
189	Major General	Uma Prasanna Mukherjee	Indian Army	MR-274 (Medical)	26 January 1976
190	Major General	Gajendra Singh Rawat AVSM	Indian Army	IC-2281 (Infantry)	26 January 1976
191	Major General	Krishna Kumar Mehta	Indian Army	IC-1011 (EME)	26 January 1976
192	Major General	Percy Harold Alfred AVSM	Indian Army	IC-2751 (AOC)	26 January 1976
193	Air Vice Marshal	Jaspal Singh VM	Indian Air Force	2451 F(P)	26 January 1976
194	Air Vice Marshal	Jafar Zaheer AVSM	Indian Air Force	3173 F(P)	26 January 1976
195	Air Vice Marshal	Jemi Harmusji Framji Manekshaw AVSM	Indian Air Force	2690 MED	26 January 1976
196	Lieutenant General	Puthiya Veetil Ramachandran	Indian Army	MR-264 (Medical)	26 January 1977
197	Lieutenant General	Som Dev Gupta	Indian Army	IC-579 (Artillery)	26 January 1977
198	Lieutenant General	Madan Mohan Lal Chhabra AVSM	Indian Army	IC-3915 (EME)	26 January 1977
199	Lieutenant General	Eric Alexander Vas	Indian Army	IC-722 (Infantry)	26 January 1977
200	Lieutenant General	Anand Narain Mathur	Indian Army	IC-1446 (Signals)	26 January 1977
201	Lieutenant General	Jaswant Singh VSM	Indian Army	IC-604 (Infantry)	26 January 1977
202	Vice Admiral	Ronald Lynsdale Pereira AVSM	Indian Navy	00018-R	26 January 1977
203	Vice Admiral	Rustom Khushro Shapoorjee Ghandhi VrC	Indian Navy	00021-Y	26 January 1977
204	Air Marshal	Anand Ramdas Pandit AVSM, DFC	Indian Air Force	1707 F(P)	26 January 1977
205	Air Marshal	Gian Dev Sharma AVSM	Indian Air Force	1742 F(P)	26 January 1977
206	Major General	Lok Nath Budhraja AVSM, MBE (Ret'd)	Indian Army	MR-315 (Medical)	26 January 1977
207	Major General	Jaswant Mayadas	Indian Army	IC-2145 (Signals)	26 January 1977
208	Major General	Kunwar Surendra Singh AVSM MC	Indian Army	IC-608 (Artillery)	26 January 1977
209	Major General	Sardul Singh Sandhu	Indian Army	IC-1800 (AOC)	26 January 1977
210	Major General	Sushil Kumar	Indian Army	IC-2362 (Infantry)	26 January 1977
211	Major General	Krishan Kumar Tewari AVSM (Ret'd)	Indian Army	IC-520 (Signals)	26 January 1977
212	Surgeon Rear Admiral	De Rosario Faust Pinto AVSM	Indian Navy	75001-F	26 January 1977
213	Air Vice Marshal	Waman Raghunath Dani (Ret'd)	Indian Air Force	1807 F(P)	26 January 1977
214	Lieutenant General	Charanjit Singh	Indian Army	IC-1507 (Artillery)	26 January 1978
215	Lieutenant General	Gurbaksh Lal Chopra	Indian Army	IC-963 (AOC)	26 January 1978
216	Lieutenant General	Raj Pall Sapra	Indian Army	IC-4299 (Signals)	26 January 1978
217	Vice Admiral	Swaraj Parkash MVC AVSM	Indian Navy	00022-Z	26 January 1978
218	Air Marshal	Trilok Nath Ghadiok AVSM VrC	Indian Air Force	2354 F(P)	26 January 1978
219	Major General	Aban Naidu AVSM	Indian Army	IC-717 (Infantry)	26 January 1978
220	Major General	Shriniwas Sadashiv Apte AVSM	Indian Army	IC-2329 (EME)	26 January 1978
221	Major General	Krishnaswamy Sundarji	Indian Army	IC-4708 (Infantry)	26 January 1978
222	Major General	Manohar Lal Chibber AVSM	Indian Army	IC-2263 (Infantry)	26 January 1978
223	Air Vice Marshal	Devendra Nath Gupta AVSM	Indian Air Force	2703 MED	26 January 1978
224	Air Vice Marshal	Achutha Viswanathan AVSM	Indian Air Force	3607 AE(M)	26 January 1978
225	Colonel	Narendra Kumar KC AVSM	Indian Army	IC-6729 (Infantry)	26 January 1978
226	Lieutenant General	Diyal Chand Sachdeva AVSM (Ret'd)	Indian Army	MR-384 (Medical)	26 January 1979
227	Lieutenant General	Biradavolu Durga Prasad Rao MBE (Ret'd)	Indian Army	MR-247 (Medical)	26 January 1979
228	Vice Admiral	Nar Pati Datta AVSM	Indian Navy	0024-B	26 January 1979
229	Air Marshal	Dilbagh Singh AVSM	Indian Air Force	2998 F(P)	26 January 1979
230	Air Marshal	Idandas Werhoma Sabhaney AVSM	Indian Air Force	2607 AEM	26 January 1979
231	Major General	Vijay Chander Khanna	Indian Army	IC-1061 (Signals)	26 January 1979
232	Major General	Sat Gur Payara	Indian Army	IC-1479 (Artillery)	26 January 1979
233	Major General	Satnam Singh Opal	Indian Army	IC-1572 (Artillery)	26 January 1979
234	Major General	Gertrude Alice Ram (Ret'd)	Indian Army	NR-680881 (Military Nursing Service)	26 January 1979
235	Major General	Mohan Dev Mehra (Ret'd)	Indian Army	DR-10007 (Dental)	26 January 1979
236	Major General	Mahesh Chandra Gupta (Ret'd)	Indian Army	MR-419 (Medical)	26 January 1979
237	Surgeon Rear Admiral	Gerald Justin Kenneth Peck	Indian Navy	75007-W	26 January 1979
238	Air Vice Marshal	Harkrishan Lal Kapur AVSM	Indian Air Force	2165 ADM	26 January 1979
239	Air Vice Marshal	Vettakkorumakankav Sivarama Narayanan AVSM VSM	Indian Air Force	3549 SIGS	26 January 1979

== See also ==
- List of Param Vishisht Seva Medal recipients (1960–1969)
- List of Param Vishisht Seva Medal recipients (1980–1989)
- List of Param Vishisht Seva Medal recipients (1990–1999)
- List of Param Vishisht Seva Medal recipients (2000–2009)
- List of Param Vishisht Seva Medal recipients (2010–2019)
- List of Param Vishisht Seva Medal recipients (2020–2029)
