= List of Param Vishisht Seva Medal recipients (1990–1999) =

The Param Vishisht Seva Medal (PVSM) (IAST: Parama Viśiṣṭa Sēvā, lit. 'supreme distinguished service medal') is the highest peacetime medal of the Indian Armed Forces, and is awarded for "distinguished service of the most exceptional order." The medal was instituted on Republic Day 1960 as the highest class of the Vishisht Seva Medal ("Distinguished Service Medal") intended to recognise "distinguished service rendered by personnel of the Armed Forces." All ranks of the Armed Forces are eligible for the medal, which may be awarded multiple times as well as posthumously.

At its creation, it was designated the Vishisht Seva Medal (Class I). On 27 January 1967, it received its present name. Post-nominals for recipients were approved on 19 August 1967.

== Recipients ==
No.	Rank	Name	Branch	Service Number (Unit)	Date of Award
440	Lieutenant General	Gurinder Singh AVSM	Indian Army	IC-6123 (Armoured Corps)	26 January 1990
441	Lieutenant General	Faridoon Noshir Billimoria	Indian Army	IC-6403 (Infantry)	26 January 1990
442	Lieutenant General	Hanut Singh MVC	Indian Army	IC-6126 (Armoured Corps)	26 January 1990
443	Lieutenant General	Gurdial Singh Grewal	Indian Army	IC-7013 (Armoured Corps)	26 January 1990
444	Lieutenant General	Vijai Singh	Indian Army	IC-7034 (Armoured Corps)	26 January 1990
445	Lieutenant General	Jagmohan Singh Rawat VSM	Indian Army	IC-6616 (Infantry)	26 January 1990
446	Lieutenant General	Kuldeep Singh Khajuria	Indian Army	IC-6715 (Armoured Corps)	26 January 1990
447	Lieutenant General	Gorakh Nath AVSM	Indian Army	IC-6529 (Army Service Corps)	26 January 1990
448	Lieutenant General	Naresh Pal Singh Bal	Indian Army	IC-7616 (Infantry)	26 January 1990
449	Lieutenant General	Suraj Prakash	Indian Army	MR-0660 (Medical)	26 January 1990
450	Lieutenant General	Ram Kumar Gaur	Indian Army	IC-6730 (Infantry)	26 January 1990
451	Lieutenant General	Harbans Lal VSM (Ret'd)	Indian Army	IC-6945 (EME)	26 January 1990
452	Major General	Vinod Badhwar VSM	Indian Army	IC-6701 (Infantry)	26 January 1990
453	Vice Admiral	Surendra Prakash Govil AVSM	Indian Navy	00165-Z	26 January 1990
454	Vice Admiral	Heathwood Johnson VSM	Indian Navy	00179-F	26 January 1990
455	Air Marshal	Har Krishan Oberai AVSM VM	Indian Air Force	4583 F(P)	26 January 1990
456	Air Marshal	Raj Kumar Mehra VSM	Indian Air Force	4518 AE(M)	26 January 1990
457	Air Marshal	Brijesh Dhar Jayal AVSM	Indian Air Force	4972 F(P)	26 January 1990
458	Air Marshal	Gandharva Sen AVSM VM (Ret'd)	Indian Air Force	4429 F(P)	26 January 1990
459	Lieutenant General	Bipin Chandra Joshi AVSM	Indian Army	IC-7011 (Armoured Corps)	26 January 1991
460	Lieutenant General	Ravindar Nath Mahajan VSM	Indian Army	IC-6482 (Infantry)	26 January 1991
461	Lieutenant General	Bhartruhari Trimbak Pandit VrC	Indian Army	IC-7320 (Engineers)	26 January 1991
462	Lieutenant General	Rangaswami Narasimhan SC VSM	Indian Army	IC-7384 (Infantry)	26 January 1991
463	Lieutenant General	Ashok Mangalik SM	Indian Army	IC-6161 (Artillery)	26 January 1991
464	Lieutenant General	Yash Pal Khurana	Indian Army	IC-6170 (Engineers)	26 January 1991
465	Lieutenant General	Christopher Anthony Barretto	Indian Army	IC-6602 (Engineers)	26 January 1991
466	Lieutenant General	Mohammad Ahmad Zaki AVSM VrC	Indian Army	IC-7613 (Infantry)	26 January 1991
467	Lieutenant General	Vinod Kumar Singh	Indian Army	IC-7709 (Infantry)	26 January 1991
468	Lieutenant General	Rajender Pal Agarwal VSM	Indian Army	IC-6770 (AOC)	26 January 1991
469	Lieutenant General	Rajendra Kumar Upadhyay VSM	Indian Army	MR-965 (Medical)	26 January 1991
470	Lieutenant General	Harbhajan Singh	Indian Army	IC-6115 (Signals)	26 January 1991
471	Lieutenant General	Ashish Banerjee (Ret'd)	Indian Army	IC-6436 (Artillery)	26 January 1991
472	Vice Admiral	Vijai Singh Shekhawat AVSM VrC	Indian Navy	00189-B	26 January 1991
473	Surgeon Vice Admiral	Om Prakash Chawla AVSM (Ret'd)	Indian Navy	75048-N	26 January 1991
474	Air Marshal	Parduman Kumar Jain VSM	Indian Air Force	4366 (A)	26 January 1991
475	Air Marshal	Rajendra Kumar Dhawan AVSM VM	Indian Air Force	4736 F(P)	26 January 1991
476	Air Marshal	Shashi Kumar Samuel Ramdas AVSM VM VSM	Indian Air Force	4930 AE(M)	26 January 1991
477	Air Vice Marshal	Trilochan Singh AVSM VrC VM	Indian Air Force	5043 F(P)	26 January 1991
478	Lieutenant General	Harwant Singh AVSM	Indian Army	IC-7697 (Armoured Corps)	26 January 1992
479	Lieutenant General	Ajai Singh AVSM	Indian Army	IC-7745 (Armoured Corps)	26 January 1992
480	Lieutenant General	Jagdish Singh VrC	Indian Army	IC-6703 (Artillery)	26 January 1992
481	Lieutenant General	Tej Pratap Singh AVSM	Indian Army	IC-7048 (Artillery)	26 January 1992
482	Lieutenant General	Malay Kumar Lahiri	Indian Army	IC-7012 (Infantry)	26 January 1992
483	Lieutenant General	Francis Tibertius Dias AVSM VrC	Indian Army	IC-7044 (Infantry)	26 January 1992
484	Lieutenant General	Vijay Madan VSM	Indian Army	IC-7057 (Infantry)	26 January 1992
485	Lieutenant General	Nirendra Chandra Sanyal	Indian Army	MR-00904 (AMC)	26 January 1992
486	Lieutenant General	Dharam Vir Kalra AVSM	Indian Army	IC-7107 (AOC)	26 January 1992
487	Lieutenant General	Kuldip Kumar Mehra	Indian Army	IC-7958 (EME)	26 January 1992
488	Lieutenant General	Ajab Singh Bhullar AVSM (Ret'd)	Indian Army	IC-6125 (EME)	26 January 1992
489	Lieutenant General	Mahendra Singh Gosain AVSM VSM (Ret'd)	Indian Army	IC-6610 (Engineers)	26 January 1992
490	Vice Admiral	Kankipati Appala Satyanarayana Zagapathi Raju AVSM NM	Indian Navy	00304-R	26 January 1992
491	Vice Admiral	Vasant Laxman Koppikar AVSM	Indian Navy	00180-H	26 January 1992
492	Vice Admiral	Shriniwas Wamanrao Lakhkar NM VSM	Indian Navy	00191-H	26 January 1992
493	Vice Admiral	Indrashil Chennagiri Rao AVSM	Indian Navy	40061-Y	26 January 1992
494	Air Marshal	Swaroop Krishna Kaul MVC	Indian Air Force	4721 F(P)	26 January 1992
495	Air Marshal	Sukhdev Mohan AVSM	Indian Air Force	4789 F(P)	26 January 1992
496	Air Marshal	Pinnapakkam Masilamani Sundaram AVSM	Indian Air Force	4857 (Medical)	26 January 1992
497	Air Marshal	Indrakanty Gopala Krishna AVSM VSM	Indian Air Force	5398 AE(M)	26 January 1992
498	Air Marshal	Abraham Mathews AVSM (Ret'd)	Indian Air Force	4547 AE(E)	26 January 1992
499	Additional Director General	Devaraja Sankara Narayana Ayyar (Ret'd)	Border Roads Organisation	GO-300F	26 January 1992
500	Lieutenant General	Prakash Mani Tripathi AVSM	Indian Army	IC-7349 (Armoured Corps)	26 January 1993
501	Lieutenant General	Ravinder Sharma AVSM	Indian Army	IC-7603 (Armoured Corps)	26 January 1993
502	Lieutenant General	Yogendra Nath Sharma AVSM VSM	Indian Army	IC-7386 (Infantry)	26 January 1993
503	Lieutenant General	Kulbir Singh	Indian Army	IC-7791 (Artillery)	26 January 1993
504	Lieutenant General	Ramesh Vishnu Kulkarni UYSM AVSM	Indian Army	IC-7810 (Infantry)	26 January 1993
505	Lieutenant General	Bakshi Krishan Nath Chhibber AVSM VSM	Indian Army	IC-8155 (Infantry)	26 January 1993
506	Lieutenant General	Maharaj Singh AVSM	Indian Army	IC-7060 (Engineers)	26 January 1993
507	Lieutenant General	Sher Amir Singh VSM	Indian Army	IC-8401 (Infantry)	26 January 1993
508	Lieutenant General	Surinder Nath AVSM	Indian Army	IC-8525 (Artillery)	26 January 1993
509	Lieutenant General	Vishweshwar Nath Kapur	Indian Army	IC-7309 (Engineers)	26 January 1993
510	Lieutenant General	Manmohan Singh (Ret'd)	Indian Army	IC-11409 (Electrical & Mechanical Engineers)	26 January 1993
511	Lieutenant General	Santosh Gopal Mookerjee AVSM VSM (Ret'd)	Indian Army	IC-7017 (Signals)	26 January 1993
512	Lieutenant General	Ashok Joshi AVSM	Indian Army	IC-8142 (Engineers)	26 January 1993
513	Lieutenant General	Yogendra Kumar Vadhera AVSM	Indian Army	IC-2814 (Infantry)	26 January 1993
514	Vice Admiral	Sudarshan Kumar Chand AVSM	Indian Navy	00316-T	26 January 1993
515	Vice Admiral	Bimalendu Guha AVSM	Indian Navy	00317-W	26 January 1993
516	Vice Admiral	Bharat Bhushan AVSM NM	Indian Navy	40069-R	26 January 1993
517	Air Marshal	Palamadai Muthuswamy Ramachandran AVSM SC	Indian Air Force	4973F(P)	26 January 1993
518	Air Marshal	Ravinder Nath Bhardwaj MVC VM	Indian Air Force	5001F(P)	26 January 1993
519	Air Marshal	Pondicherry Jayarao Jayakumar AVSM	Indian Air Force	5037F(P)	26 January 1993
520	Air Marshal	Dushyant Singh VM VSM	Indian Air Force	5043F(P)	26 January 1993
521	Lieutenant General	Shankar Roychowdhury	Indian Army	IC-8417 (Armoured Corps)	26 January 1994
522	Lieutenant General	Gurbaksh Lal Bakshi	Indian Army	IC-8111 (Armoured Corps)	26 January 1994
523	Lieutenant General	Dhirender Krishen Khanna AVSM	Indian Army	IC-10013 (Infantry)	26 January 1994
524	Lieutenant General	Satish Nambiar AVSM VrC	Indian Army	IC-10018 (Mechanised Infantry)	26 January 1994
525	Lieutenant General	Jagdish Chandra Pant	Indian Army	IC-10064 (Infantry)	26 January 1994
526	Lieutenant General	Vasantha Rao Raghavan UYSM AVSM	Indian Army	IC-10150 (Infantry)	26 January 1994
527	Lieutenant General	Jaswant Singh Ahluwalia	Indian Army	IC-10085 (Electrical & Mechanical Engineers)	26 January 1994
528	Lieutenant General	Birinder Singh Nalwa	Indian Army	IC-8117 (Artillery)	26 January 1994
529	Lieutenant General	Harish Kumar Kapoor AVSM	Indian Army	IC-8236 (Artillery)	26 January 1994
530	Lieutenant General	Piyush Kanti Chakrabarti	Indian Army	MR-01397K (AMC)	26 January 1994
531	Lieutenant General	Amarjit Singh Kalkat SYSM AVSM VSM (Ret'd)	Indian Army	IC-7347 (Infantry)	26 January 1994
532	Lieutenant General	Dhirendra Dutt Saklani AVSM (Ret'd)	Indian Army	IC-7779 (Infantry)	26 January 1994
533	Lieutenant General	Kuldip Chander Taneja (Ret'd)	Indian Army	IC-7612 (Engineers)	26 January 1994
534	Lieutenant General	Satish Chandra Ahuja AVSM (Ret'd)	Indian Army	IC-7022 (Signals)	26 January 1994
535	Lieutenant General	Velachery Jagadesan Sundram AVSM VSM (Ret'd)	Indian Army	IC-10587 (Electrical & Mechanical Engineers)	26 January 1994
536	Lieutenant General	Prakash Chand Mankotia AVSM (Ret'd)	Indian Army	IC-7877 (Infantry)	26 January 1994
537	Lieutenant General	Nirvikar Swarup Bhatnagar AVSM (Ret'd)	Indian Army	IC-7711 (Army Service Corps)	26 January 1994
538	Vice Admiral	Inderjit Bedi AVSM	Indian Navy	00327-T	26 January 1994
539	Vice Admiral	Avinash Chandra Bhatia AVSM	Indian Navy	60066-N	26 January 1994
540	Vice Admiral	Mauli Bhushan Ghosh AVSM NM	Indian Navy	40070-T	26 January 1994
541	Air Marshal	Naresh Kumar AVSM VM	Indian Air Force	5057 F(P)	26 January 1994
542	Air Marshal	Amal Kumar Mukhopadhyaya AVSM	Indian Air Force	5237 AE(M)	26 January 1994
543	Air Marshal	Prabhat Kumar Varma AVSM VM	Indian Air Force	4822 F(P)	26 January 1994
544	Air Marshal	Keith David Kingsley Lewis AVSM VM (Ret'd)	Indian Air Force	5109 F(P)	26 January 1994
545	Lieutenant General	Surinder Singh AVSM	Indian Army	IC-10008 (Armoured Corps)	26 January 1995
546	Lieutenant General	Rameshwar Nath Batra VSM	Indian Army	IC-10032 (Armoured Corps)	26 January 1995
547	Lieutenant General	Ravinder Kumar Gulati	Indian Army	IC-10447 (Armoured Corps)	26 January 1995
548	Lieutenant General	Moti Lal Dar AVSM	Indian Army	IC-10462 (Armoured Corps)	26 January 1995
549	Lieutenant General	Arun Kumar Gautama	Indian Army	IC-10489 (Armoured Corps)	26 January 1995
550	Lieutenant General	Ramesh Khoda	Indian Army	IC-7777 (Artillery)	26 January 1995
551	Lieutenant General	Malay Kumar Ghosh AVSM	Indian Army	IC-7802 (Corps of Signals)	26 January 1995
552	Lieutenant General	Surender Verma	Indian Army	IC-8572 (Army Ordnance Corps)	26 January 1995
553	Lieutenant General	Ranjit Shivdasani	Indian Army	IC-10104 (Engineers)	26 January 1995
554	Lieutenant General	Satish Talwar VSM	Indian Army	IC-10457 (Army Ordnance Corps)	26 January 1995
555	Lieutenant General	Madan Mohan Lakhera AVSM VSM	Indian Army	IC-10497 (Infantry)	26 January 1995
556	Lieutenant General	Jagdish Narain AVSM VSM	Indian Army	IC-11728 (Engineers)	26 January 1995
557	Lieutenant General	Chander Kailash Kapur AVSM	Indian Army	IC-12169 (Infantry)	26 January 1995
558	Lieutenant General	Apurba Daityari VSM (Ret'd)	Indian Army	MR-0990 (AMC)	26 January 1995
559	Lieutenant General	Rajinder Kumar Suri VSM (Ret'd)	Indian Army	MR-1420 (AMC)	26 January 1995
560	Lieutenant General	Suresh Nath Endley AVSM (Ret'd)	Indian Army	IC-10107 (Engineers)	26 January 1995
561	Lieutenant General	Jawahar Lal Malhotra AVSM VSM (Ret'd)	Indian Army	IC-10109 (Mechanised Infantry)	26 January 1995
562	Lieutenant General	Kishan Bhatia (Ret'd)	Indian Army	IC-10158 (Army Service Corps)	26 January 1995
563	Brigadier	Mohinder Pratap Bhagat	Indian Army	IC-16634 (Infantry)	26 January 1995
564	Vice Admiral	Raj Bahadur Suri AVSM VSM	Indian Navy	00375-A	26 January 1995
565	Vice Admiral	Achanta Venkata Rama Narayana Rao AVSM VSM	Indian Navy	50077-K	26 January 1995
566	Air Marshal	Pratap Rao AVSM VM	Indian Air Force	5188 F(P)	26 January 1995
567	Air Marshal	Verinder Puri VM	Indian Air Force	5199 F(P)	26 January 1995
568	Air Marshal	Sadanand Kulkarni VM	Indian Air Force	5292 F(N)	26 January 1995
569	Air Marshal	Satish Kumar Sareen AVSM VM	Indian Air Force	5370 F(P)	26 January 1995
570	Air Marshal	Kodandera Cariappa 'Nanda' Cariappa VM	Indian Air Force	5376 F(P)	26 January 1995
571	Air Marshal	Rajamani Ramamurthy VSM (Ret'd)	Indian Air Force	5614 AE(M)	26 January 1995
572	Lieutenant General	Suresh Kumar Sharma AVSM	Indian Army	IC-11517 (Armoured Corps)	26 January 1996
573	Lieutenant General	Ved Prakash Malik AVSM	Indian Army	IC-11537 (Infantry)	26 January 1996
574	Lieutenant General	Vimal Shinghal	Indian Army	IC-10401 (Engineers)	26 January 1996
575	Lieutenant General	Neel Rattan Khanna	Indian Army	IC-10443 (Engineers)	26 January 1996
576	Lieutenant General	Kulbir Suri VSM	Indian Army	IC-11009 (Artillery)	26 January 1996
577	Lieutenant General	Deepak Ajwani VSM	Indian Army	IC-11043 (Engineers)	26 January 1996
578	Lieutenant General	Kevin Louis D'Souza AVSM	Indian Army	IC-11507 (Mechanized Infantry)	26 January 1996
579	Lieutenant General	Parshotam Dass Bhargava AVSM	Indian Army	IC-11577 (Engineers)	26 January 1996
580	Lieutenant General	Pran Krishan Pahwa	Indian Army	IC-11628 (Air Defence Artillery)	26 January 1996
581	Lieutenant General	Om Prakash Kaushik AVSM VSM (Ret'd)	Indian Army	IC-11689 (Infantry)	26 January 1996
582	Lieutenant General	Mohinder Mohan Walia AVSM SM	Indian Army	IC-11830 (Infantry)	26 January 1996
583	Lieutenant General	Venkatesh Madhav Patil AVSM	Indian Army	IC-11885 (Artillery)	26 January 1996
584	Lieutenant General	Apurba Kumar Sengupta AVSM	Indian Army	IC-11942 (Armoured Corps)	26 January 1996
585	Lieutenant General	Kulwant Singh Mann	Indian Army	IC-12027 (Infantry)	26 January 1996
586	Lieutenant General	Ravi Inder Singh Kahlon UYSM AVSM	Indian Army	IC-12048 (Grenadiers)	26 January 1996
587	Lieutenant General	Ramdas Mohan AVSM VSM	Indian Army	IC-12584 (Infantry)	26 January 1996
588	Lieutenant General	Narender Kumar Kapur AVSM	Indian Army	IC-11536 (Infantry)	26 January 1996
589	Lieutenant General	Amarjit Singh Parmar	Indian Army	IC-10063 (Artillery)	26 January 1996
590	Lieutenant General	Harbans Lal Gulati (Ret'd)	Indian Army	MR-01476 (AMC)	26 January 1996
591	Vice Admiral	Vishnu Bhagwat AVSM	Indian Navy	00387-B	26 January 1996
592	Vice Admiral	Premvir Saran Das UYSM VSM	Indian Navy	00393-T	26 January 1996
593	Vice Admiral	Kailash Kumar Kohli AVSM	Indian Navy	00407-Z	26 January 1996
594	Air Marshal	Mohinder Kumar Anand VM (Ret'd)	Indian Air Force	5498 (ADM)	26 January 1996
595	Air Marshal	Sharadkumar Ramakrishna Deshpande AVSM VM	Indian Air Force	5694 F(P)	26 January 1996
596	Air Marshal	Dinanath Ramchander Nadkarni AVSM VM (Ret'd)	Indian Air Force	5587 F(P)	26 January 1996
597	Air Marshal	Shiv Nath Rathour AVSM VM (Ret'd)	Indian Air Force	5580 F(N)	26 January 1996
598	Air Marshal	Machianda Chinapa Uthaya (Ret'd)	Indian Air Force	5627 AE(E)	26 January 1996
599	Air Marshal	Janak Kapur VSM	Indian Air Force	5585 F(P)	26 January 1996
600	Lieutenant General	Ravi Eipe AVSM	Indian Army	IC-11566 (Infantry)	26 January 1997
601	Lieutenant General	Chandra Shekhar AVSM	Indian Army	IC-11837 (Infantry)	26 January 1997
602	Lieutenant General	Sundararajan Padmanabhan AVSM VSM	Indian Army	IC-11859 (Artillery)	26 January 1997
603	Lieutenant General	Hari Mohan Khanna AVSM	Indian Army	IC-12315 (Infantry)	26 January 1997
604	Lieutenant General	Hira Ballabh Kala AVSM SC	Indian Army	IC-12356 (Infantry)	26 January 1997
605	Lieutenant General	Harnarinder Singh Bedi	Indian Army	IC-11558 (Infantry)	26 January 1997
606	Lieutenant General	Amarjit Singh Sandhu	Indian Army	IC-11823 (Armoured Corps)	26 January 1997
607	Lieutenant General	Surjit Singh Sethi AVSM	Indian Army	IC-11825 (Artillery)	26 January 1997
608	Lieutenant General	Krishna Mohan Seth AVSM	Indian Army	IC-12070 (Artillery)	26 January 1997
609	Lieutenant General	Kuldip Singh Sethi AVSM	Indian Army	IC-12361 (Artillery)	26 January 1997
610	Lieutenant General	Baldev Singh Randhawa AVSM	Indian Army	IC-12410 (Infantry)	26 January 1997
611	Lieutenant General	Manjit Singh Bhullar VSM	Indian Army	IC-12524 (Infantry)	26 January 1997
612	Lieutenant General	Jagdish Singh Dhillon YSM	Indian Army	IC-12534 (Infantry)	26 January 1997
613	Lieutenant General	Vijay Kumar Kapoor AVSM	Indian Army	IC-12793 (EME)	26 January 1997
614	Lieutenant General	Tej Pal Singh Rawat VSM	Indian Army	IC-12836 (Infantry)	26 January 1997
615	Lieutenant General	Sarabjit Singh Grewal AVSM SM VSM	Indian Army	IC-13264 (Infantry)	26 January 1997
616	Lieutenant General	Chandan Singh Nugyal UYSM	Indian Army	IC-12851 (Infantry)	26 January 1997
617	Vice Admiral	Avnish Rai Tandon AVSM	Indian Navy	00421-F	26 January 1997
618	Vice Admiral	Adolph Britto AVSM VSM	Indian Navy	40143-K	26 January 1997
619	Vice Admiral	Verghese Kolthara AVSM VSM	Indian Navy	60086-H	26 January 1997
620	Air Marshal	Bharat Kumar AVSM	Indian Air Force	5787 F(P)	26 January 1997
621	Air Marshal	Anil Yashwant Tipnis AVSM VM	Indian Air Force	5859 F(P)	26 January 1997
622	Air Marshal	Krishna Bihari Singh AVSM VM VSM	Indian Air Force	5865 F(P)	26 January 1997
623	Air Marshal	Trevor Raymond Joseph Osman AVSM	Indian Air Force	6005 F(P)	26 January 1997
624	Air Marshal	Ghanshyam Gururani AVSM VSM	Indian Air Force	6387 AE(M)	26 January 1997
625	Air Marshal	Ramesh Chandra Bajpai AVSM (Ret'd)	Indian Air Force	5967 AE(E)	26 January 1997
626	Lieutenant General	Vijay Oberoi AVSM VSM	Indian Army	IC-12522 (Infantry)	26 January 1998
627	Lieutenant General	Surjit Singh Sangra VSM	Indian Army	IC-12618 (Infantry)	26 January 1998
628	Lieutenant General	Niranjan Singh Malik	Indian Army	IC-11804 (Armoured Corps)	26 January 1998
629	Lieutenant General	Surinder Kumar Jetley AVSM SM	Indian Army	IC-12303 (Armoured Corps)	26 January 1998
630	Lieutenant General	Kamaljit Singh VSM	Indian Army	IC-12536 (Armoured Corps)	26 January 1998
631	Lieutenant General	Mitlesh Rai Kochhar AVSM	Indian Army	IC-11815 (EME)	26 January 1998
632	Lieutenant General	Gurprit Singh Brar AVSM VSM	Indian Army	IC-12642 (Infantry)	26 January 1998
633	Lieutenant General	Inder Kumar Varma AVSM	Indian Army	IC-12707 (Infantry)	26 January 1998
634	Lieutenant General	Amar Nath Sinha AVSM	Indian Army	IC-11870 (Engineers)	26 January 1998
635	Lieutenant General	Vinay Shankar AVSM VSM	Indian Army	IC-12090 (Artillery)	26 January 1998
636	Lieutenant General	Ravi Kumar Sawhney AVSM	Indian Army	IC-12992 (Infantry)	26 January 1998
637	Lieutenant General	Amitava Mukherjee AVSM	Indian Army	IC-12149 (Artillery)	26 January 1998
638	Lieutenant General	Alla Rama Krishna Reddy AVSM	Indian Army	IC-13379 (Infantry)	26 January 1998
639	Lieutenant General	Amar Jit Singh Bhalla	Indian Army	IC-12561 (Signals)	26 January 1998
640	Lieutenant General	Ashok Kumar Agarwal	Indian Army	IC-12797 (EME)	26 January 1998
641	Lieutenant General	Dasarathy Raghunath AVSM (Ret'd)	Indian Army	MR-01435 (AMC)	26 January 1998
642	Vice Admiral	Sushil Kumar UYSM AVSM NM	Indian Navy	00419-W	26 January 1998
643	Vice Admiral	Madhvendra Singh AVSM	Indian Navy	00502-R	26 January 1998
644	Vice Admiral	Desh Bandhu Kapila AVSM VSM (Ret'd)	Indian Navy	50104-Y	26 January 1998
645	Air Marshal	Prithvi Singh Brar AVSM & bar VM	Indian Air Force	6007 F(P)	26 January 1998
646	Air Marshal	Vinod Patney AVSM VrC	Indian Air Force	6125 F(P)	26 January 1998
647	Air Marshal	Srinivasapuram Krishnaswamy AVSM VM & bar	Indian Air Force	6338 F(P)	26 January 1998
648	Air Marshal	Krishnan Narayanan Nair AVSM	Indian Air Force	6346 F(P)	26 January 1998
649	Air Marshal	Vinod Kumar Bhatia AVSM VrC & bar	Indian Air Force	6497 F(P)	26 January 1998
650	Air Marshal	Manmohan Singh Vasudeva UYSM VM (Ret'd)	Indian Air Force	6128 F(P)	26 January 1998
651	Lieutenant General	Har Ranjit Singh Kalkat AVSM	Indian Army	IC-13193 (Infantry)	26 January 1999
652	Lieutenant General	Russell Jacob Mordecai AVSM	Indian Army	IC-12543 (Engineers)	26 January 1999
653	Lieutenant General	Srirangam Rajagopalan Ranganathan Aiyenger AVSM VSM	Indian Army	IC-12577 (Signals)	26 January 1999
654	Lieutenant General	Nirmal Chander Vij AVSM	Indian Army	IC-13710 (Infantry)	26 January 1999
655	Lieutenant General	Rustum Kaikhusrau Nanavatty UYSM AVSM	Indian Army	IC-13878 (Infantry)	26 January 1999
656	Lieutenant General	Pankaj Shivram Joshi AVSM VSM	Indian Army	IC-13720 (Mechanised Infantry)	26 January 1999
657	Lieutenant General	Krishan Pal VSM & bar	Indian Army	IC-14039 (Infantry)	26 January 1999
658	Vice Admiral	Perumpacheruvilla Johnson Jacob AVSM VSM	Indian Navy	00511-K	26 January 1999
659	Vice Admiral	Vinod Pasricha AVSM NM	Indian Navy	00522-K	26 January 1999
660	Vice Admiral	Alampallam Sundara Rajan Krishnan AVSM VSM	Indian Navy	40157-R	26 January 1999
661	Air Marshal	Jagbir Singh Rai VM & bar	Indian Air Force	6507 F(P)	26 January 1999
662	Air Marshal	Darshan Singh Basra AVSM VM	Indian Air Force	6519 F(P)	26 January 1999
663	Air Marshal	Vinod Kumar Verma AVSM VM	Indian Air Force	6528 F(P)	26 January 1999
664	Air Marshal	Dinesh Chandra Dhyani AVSM VSM	Indian Air Force	6590 (A)	26 January 1999
665	Air Marshal	Velayudhan Girish Kumar AVSM VM	Indian Air Force	6747 F(P)	26 January 1999
666	Air Marshal	Shanti Swaroop Gupta AVSM VSM	Indian Air Force	6805 AE(M)	26 January 1999

== See also ==
- List of Param Vishisht Seva Medal recipients (1960–1969)
- List of Param Vishisht Seva Medal recipients (1970–1979)
- List of Param Vishisht Seva Medal recipients (1980–1989)
- List of Param Vishisht Seva Medal recipients (2000–2009)
- List of Param Vishisht Seva Medal recipients (2010–2019)
- List of Param Vishisht Seva Medal recipients (2020–2029)
