= List of Param Vishisht Seva Medal recipients (1960–1969) =

The Param Vishisht Seva Medal (PVSM) (IAST: Parama Viśiṣṭa Sēvā, lit. 'supreme distinguished service medal') is the highest peacetime medal of the Indian Armed Forces, and is awarded for "distinguished service of the most exceptional order." The medal was instituted on Republic Day 1960 as the highest class of the Vishisht Seva Medal ("Distinguished Service Medal") intended to recognise "distinguished service rendered by personnel of the Armed Forces." All ranks of the Armed Forces are eligible for the medal, which may be awarded multiple times as well as posthumously.

At its creation, it was designated the Vishisht Seva Medal (Class I). On 27 January 1967, it received its present name. Post-nominals for recipients were approved on 19 August 1967.

== Recipients ==
Key
†	Indicates posthumous honour

No.	Rank	Name	Branch	Service Number (Unit)	Date of Award
1	Lieutenant General	Brij Mohan Kaul	Indian Army	AI-162	26 January 1961
2	Rear Admiral	Daya Shankar DSC	Indian Navy		26 January 1961
3	Air Vice Marshal	Harjinder Singh	Indian Air Force	1963 ENG	26 January 1962
4	Major General	Kunhiraman Palat Candeth	Indian Army	IC-162	26 January 1963
5	Brigadier	Kottimukkla Alagaraja Singapparaja Raja	Indian Army	IC-801	26 January 1963
6	Brigadier	Kalyan Singh	Indian Army	IC-403	26 January 1963
7	Major General	Mahindra Singh Pathania	Indian Army	IC-104	26 January 1963
8	Air Vice Marshal	Kanwar Jaswant Singh	Indian Air Force	1587 GD(P)	26 January 1963
9	Major General	Rawind Singh Garewal MC	Indian Army	IC-127	26 January 1963
10	Major General	Diwan Prem Chand	Indian Army	IC-161	4 April 1963
11	Brigadier	Reginald Stephen Noronha MC	Indian Army	IC-531	4 April 1963
12	Lieutenant General	Daulet Singh	Indian Army	IA-977	26 January 1964
13	Lieutenant General	Bikram Singh	Indian Army	AI-112	26 January 1964
14	Lieutenant General	Prem Singh Gyani OBE	Indian Army	IA-1281	26 January 1964
15	Air Vice Marshal	Erlic Wilmot Pinto	Indian Air Force	1593 GD(P)	26 January 1964
16	Air Vice Marshal	Minoo Merwan Engineer MVC DFC	Indian Air Force	1614 GD(P)	26 January 1964
17	Lieutenant General	Thomas Bryan Henderson Brooks	Indian Army	AI-824	5 March 1964
18	Major General	Kartar Nath Dubey	Indian Army	IC-603 (Engineers)	26 January 1965
19	Brigadier	Shavak Naswaranji Antia	Indian Army	IC-2130 (Signals)	26 January 1965
20	Brigadier	Syed Baquar Raza	Indian Army	IC-806 (Artillery)	26 January 1965
21	Brigadier	Badri Nath Upadhyay	Indian Army	IC-2958 (9 Gorkha Rifles)	26 January 1965
22	Brigadier	Shewak Singh Mulchand Pahlajani	Indian Army	IC-424 (Infantry)	8 July 1965
23	Brigadier	Vijay Kumar Ghai	Indian Army	IC-1672 (Artillery)	8 July 1965
24	Major General	Joginder Singh	Indian Army	IC-203	10 November 1965
25	Group Captain	George Kanisht Kumar John	Indian Air Force	2132 GD(P)	10 November 1965
26	Group Captain	Walter Vernon Alexander Lloyd	Indian Air Force	2623 GD(P)	10 November 1965
27	Lieutenant General	Moti Sagar	Indian Army	IC-25	26 January 1966
28	Major General	Amrik Singh MC	Indian Army	IC-133	26 January 1966
29	Major General	Rajinder Nath Batra	Indian Army	IC-446	26 January 1966
30	Rear Admiral	Benjamin Abraham Samson	Indian Navy		26 January 1966
31	Rear Admiral	Sardarilal Mathradas Nanda AVSM	Indian Navy		26 January 1966
32	Brigadier	Iorwerth George Jenkins MC	Indian Army	IC-1389	26 January 1966
33	Brigadier	Zora Singh	Indian Army	IC-3287	26 January 1966
34	Brigadier	Onkar Singh Kalkat	Indian Army	IC-810	26 January 1966
35	Air Commodore	Krishna Mahesh Agerwala	Indian Air Force	1648 GD(N)	26 January 1966
36	Brigadier	Bhumi Chand Chauhan	Indian Army	IC-660	30 September 1966
37	Lieutenant General	Tirath Ram Pahwa	Indian Army	MR-158 (Medical)	26 January 1967
38	Major General	Sailendra Mohan Basu	Indian Army	MR-145 (Medical)	26 January 1967
39	Rear Admiral	Pabitra Kumar Mukherjee	Indian Navy		26 January 1967
40	Air Vice Marshal	Yeshwant Vinayak Malse	Indian Air Force	1616 GD(P)	26 January 1967
41	Air Vice Marshal	Kanianthra Alexander Joseph	Indian Air Force	2960 SIGS	26 January 1967
42	Air Commodore	Gurbachan Singh	Indian Air Force	1779 EQPT	26 January 1967
43	Lieutenant General	Amarendra Krishna Dey	Indian Army	MR-135 (Medical)	26 January 1968
44	Major General	Satya Paul Vohra	Indian Army	IC-609 (EME)	26 January 1968
45	Rear Admiral	Sourendra Nath Kohli	Indian Navy		26 January 1968
46	Air Vice Marshal	Shivdev Singh	Indian Air Force	1595 GD(P)	26 January 1968
47	Air Vice Marshal	Om Prakash Mehra	Indian Air Force	1639 GD(P)	26 January 1968
48	Lieutenant General	Apparanda Chengappa Iyappa (Ret'd)	Indian Army	IC-89 (Signals)	26 January 1969
49	Lieutenant General	Bidyapati Bhattacharjya	Indian Army	MR-147 (Medical)	26 January 1969
50	Lieutenant General	Gopal Gurunath Bewoor	Indian Army	IC-129 (Infantry)	26 January 1969
51	Lieutenant General	Rajinder Singh Paintal	Indian Army	IC-125 (Infantry)	26 January 1969
52	Major General	Panavelil Thomas Joseph AVSM	Indian Army	MR-150 (Medical)	26 January 1969
53	Major General	Inderjit Singh Gill MC	Indian Army	IC-1641 (Infantry)	26 January 1969
54	Rear Admiral	Kesavapillai Ramakrishnan Nair	Indian Navy		26 January 1969
55	Air Vice Marshal	Hari Chand Dewan	Indian Air Force	1598 GD(P)	26 January 1969
56	Air Vice Marshal	Teja Singh Virk	Indian Air Force	1621 GD(N)	26 January 1969

== See also ==
- List of Param Vishisht Seva Medal recipients (1970–1979)
- List of Param Vishisht Seva Medal recipients (1980–1989)
- List of Param Vishisht Seva Medal recipients (1990–1999)
- List of Param Vishisht Seva Medal recipients (2000–2009)
- List of Param Vishisht Seva Medal recipients (2010–2019)
- List of Param Vishisht Seva Medal recipients (2020–2029)
