= List of Param Vishisht Seva Medal recipients (1980–1989) =

The Param Vishisht Seva Medal (PVSM) (IAST: Parama Viśiṣṭa Sēvā, lit. 'supreme distinguished service medal') is the highest peacetime medal of the Indian Armed Forces, and is awarded for "distinguished service of the most exceptional order." The medal was instituted on Republic Day 1960 as the highest class of the Vishisht Seva Medal ("Distinguished Service Medal") intended to recognise "distinguished service rendered by personnel of the Armed Forces." All ranks of the Armed Forces are eligible for the medal, which may be awarded multiple times as well as posthumously.

At its creation, it was designated the Vishisht Seva Medal (Class I). On 27 January 1967, it received its present name. Post-nominals for recipients were approved on 19 August 1967.

== Recipients ==
No.	Rank	Name	Branch	Service Number (Unit)	Date of Award
240	Lieutenant General	Jitendra Chandra Chatterji	Indian Army	MR-495 (Medical)	26 January 1980
241	Vice Admiral	Vivian Eric Charles Barboza AVSM & bar	Indian Navy	00033-Z	26 January 1980
242	Air Marshal	Chandrakant Shridhar Naik AVSM VSM	Indian Air Force	3499 AE(M)	26 January 1980
243	Air Marshal	Lakshman Madhav Katre AVSM & bar	Indian Air Force	3117 F(P)	26 January 1980
244	Major General	Jagdarshan Singh Soin	Indian Army	IC-1595 (Engineers)	26 January 1980
245	Major General	Natarajan Ramachandran	Indian Army	IC-3755 (Infantry)	26 January 1980
246	Major General	Mohan Lal	Indian Army	IC-2429 (Infantry)	26 January 1980
247	Major General	Girish Narayan Sinha	Indian Army	IC-2781 (Infantry)	26 January 1980
248	Major General	Lachman Das Khurana VSM	Indian Army	MR-426 (Medical)	26 January 1980
249	Major General	Hari Narayan Shingal AVSM (Ret'd)	Indian Army	IC-3210 (Infantry)	26 January 1980
250	Major General	Mulamootil Geevarughese Abraham (Ret'd)	Indian Army	IC-2103 (AOC)	26 January 1980
251	Major General	Prithvi Raj (Ret'd)	Indian Army	IC-4281 (Infantry)	26 January 1980
252	Major General	Anand Vishwanath Natu MVC (Ret'd)	Indian Army	IC-4703 (Infantry)	26 January 1980
253	Air Vice Marshal	Kuppuswamier Chidambaram (Ret'd)	Indian Air Force	3531 LGS	26 January 1980
254	Lieutenant General	Adi M. Sethna AVSM	Indian Army	IC-522 (Infantry)	26 January 1981
255	Lieutenant General	Harish Chandra Dutta	Indian Army	IC-2266 (Infantry)	26 January 1981
256	Lieutenant General	Surinder Nath Sharma AVSM	Indian Army	IC-1475 (Engineers)	26 January 1981
257	Lieutenant General	Tirath Singh Oberoi VrC	Indian Army	IC-1591 (Infantry)	26 January 1981
258	Lieutenant General	Amar Singh AVSM	Indian Army	IC-2905 (Army Service Corps)	26 January 1981
259	Vice Admiral	Melville Raymond Schunker AVSM	Indian Navy	00034-A	26 January 1981
260	Vice Admiral	Oscar Stanley Dawson AVSM	Indian Navy	000358	26 January 1981
261	Air Marshal	Saroj Jena AVSM VM	Indian Air Force	3157 F(P)	26 January 1981
262	Air Marshal	Hemant Ramkrishna Chitnis AVSM VM	Indian Air Force	2964 F(P)	26 January 1981
263	Air Marshal	Trilochan Singh Brar AVSM	Indian Air Force	2884 F(P)	26 January 1981
264	Major General	Som Nath Bhaskar (Ret'd)	Indian Army	IC-4239 (EME)	26 January 1981
265	Major General	Baljit Kumar Mehta AVSM	Indian Army	IC-5445 (Infantry)	26 January 1981
266	Major General	Samir Chandra Sinha	Indian Army	IC-1813 (Infantry)	26 January 1981
267	Major General	Pullode Kulathingal Lakshmikutty	Indian Army	NR-680954 (Military Nursing Service)	26 January 1981
268	Major General	Prikshat Raj Puri	Indian Army	IC-2261 (Engineers)	26 January 1981
269	Major General	Ram Chandra Vinayak Apte AVSM (Ret'd)	Indian Army	IC-1909 (Artillery)	26 January 1981
270	Air Vice Marshal	Mulk Raj AVSM	Indian Air Force	3518 MED	26 January 1981
271	Lieutenant General	Harbhajan Singh Banga VSM	Indian Army	IC-4183 (EME)	26 January 1982
272	Lieutenant General	Raj Kumar Jasbir Singh	Indian Army	IC-2409 (Infantry)	26 January 1982
273	Lieutenant General	Vallury Venkateswara Surya Prataprao	Indian Army	MR-00445 (Medical)	26 January 1982
274	Lieutenant General	Harnam Singh Seth	Indian Army	MR-00536 (Medical)	26 January 1982
275	Vice Admiral	Manohar Prahlad Awati VrC	Indian Navy	00037-H	26 January 1982
276	Air Marshal	Douglas George King-Lee AVSM	Indian Air Force	3040 F(P)	26 January 1982
277	Air Marshal	Balwant Wickram Chauhan AVSM	Indian Air Force	3352 F(P)	26 January 1982
278	Air Marshal	Jagdish Raj Bhasin AVSM VM	Indian Air Force	3591 F(P)	26 January 1982
279	Major General	Hardit Singh Sobti AVSM	Indian Army	IC-1585 (Engineers)	26 January 1982
280	Major General	Rajendra Nath	Indian Army	IC-2306 (Infantry)	26 January 1982
281	Major General	Uttam Chand Chopra (Ret'd)	Indian Army	IC-4435 (AOC)	26 January 1982
282	Major General	Mithilesh Chandra Gupta	Indian Army	IC-2300 (Engineers)	26 January 1982
283	Major General	Kailash Chander	Indian Army	IC-1609 (Artillery)	26 January 1982
284	Major General	Krishan Lal Kochar	Indian Army	IC-4844 (Infantry)	26 January 1982
285	Major General	Chittor Venugopal MVC	Indian Army	IC-5096 (Infantry)	26 January 1982
286	Major General	Man Mohan Suri (Ret'd)	Indian Army	DR-10023 (Dental)	26 January 1982
287	Major General	Onkar Singh Bhandari	Indian Army	IC-7247 (Infantry)	26 January 1982
288	Major General	Avtar Singh AVSM	Indian Army	IC-2438 (Artillery)	26 January 1982
289	Surgeon Rear Admiral	Narinder Nath Katariya	Indian Navy	75223-K; MR-00384-A (Medical)	26 January 1982
290	Air Vice Marshal	Lareto Pestana Pereira	Indian Air Force	3705 AEM	26 January 1982
291	Air Vice Marshal	Vajjha Sriman Narayana Murthy	Indian Air Force	3587 MED	26 January 1982
292	Lieutenant General	Arunkumar Shridhar Vaidya MVC & bar AVSM	Indian Army	IC-1701 (Armoured Corps)	26 January 1983
293	Lieutenant General	Yashwanth Dattatreya Sahasrabuddhe	Indian Army	IC-1603 (ASC)	26 January 1983
294	Lieutenant General	Man Mohan Lal Ghai	Indian Army	IC-3954 (Engineers)	26 January 1983
295	Lieutenant General	Kanwal Kishan Hazari AVSM	Indian Army	IC-4468 (Artillery)	26 January 1983
296	Lieutenant General	Manohar Singh Sodhi	Indian Army	IC-1592 (Signals)	26 January 1983
297	Lieutenant General	Tilak Bahadur Nanda	Indian Army	IC-1001	26 January 1983
298	Vice Admiral	Sardari Lal Sethi AVSM NM	Indian Navy	00052T	26 January 1983
299	Vice Admiral	Anil Kumar Bhatia AVSM VSM	Indian Navy	50005Y	26 January 1983
300	Surgeon Vice Admiral	Gopala Kuppuswamy VSM (Ret'd)	Indian Navy	75006T	26 January 1983
301	Air Marshal	Kanwar Iqbal Singh Chhabra AVSM	Indian Air Force	3591 F(N)	26 January 1983
302	Air Marshal	Minoo Jehangir Dotiwalla	Indian Air Force	3839 F(P)	26 January 1983
303	Air Marshal	Satish Chandra Lal	Indian Air Force	3793 AE(L)	26 January 1983
304	Air Marshal	Kapil Dev Chadha VM	Indian Air Force	3845 F(P)	26 January 1983
305	Major General	Narinder Singh	Indian Army	IC-3935 (Armoured Corps)	26 January 1983
306	Major General	Sudarshan Lal Malhotra AVSM	Indian Army	IC-4789 (Infantry)	26 January 1983
307	Major General	Naresh Kumar	Indian Army	IC-5844 (Artillery)	26 January 1983
308	Major General	Vijay Kumar Nayar SM	Indian Army	IC-5858 (Infantry)	26 January 1983
309	Major General	Ashoke Banerjee VrC	Indian Army	MR-381 (AMC)	26 January 1983
310	Major General	Stanley William Burrett AVSM (Ret'd)	Indian Army	IC-1589 (Engineers)	26 January 1983
311	Major General	Brij Nath Dhar (Ret'd)	Indian Army	IC-2381 (AOC)	26 January 1983
312	Major General	Vattarangath Gouri (Ret'd)	Indian Army	NR-680965 (MNS)	26 January 1983
313	Air Vice Marshal	Shri Krishna Chandra Gupta VSM	Indian Air Force	3568 A	26 January 1983
314	Lieutenant General	Krishnaswami Balaram	Indian Army	IC-2271 (Signals)	26 January 1984
315	Lieutenant General	Hridaya Kaul AVSM	Indian Army	IC-3941 (Armoured Corps)	26 January 1984
316	Lieutenant General	Mathew Thomas AVSM VSM	Indian Army	IC-3950 (Infantry)	26 January 1984
317	Lieutenant General	Ranjit Singh Dyal MVC	Indian Army	IC-4004 (Infantry)	26 January 1984
318	Lieutenant General	Sahdev Sehgal	Indian Army	IC-2304 (Infantry)	26 January 1984
319	Lieutenant General	Anant Dattatraya Mohoni VSM	Indian Army	IC-1730 (AOC)	26 January 1984
320	Lieutenant General	Devendra Swaroop	Indian Army	IC-4241 (EME)	26 January 1984
321	Vice Admiral	Mihir Kumar Roy AVSM	Indian Navy	00040R	26 January 1984
322	Vice Admiral	Radhakrishna Hariram Tahiliani AVSM	Indian Navy	00050N	26 January 1984
323	Vice Admiral	Subimal Mookerjee AVSM	Indian Navy	00053W	26 January 1984
324	Vice Admiral	Kewal Krishan Nayyar AVSM	Indian Navy	00054Y	26 January 1984
325	Air Marshal	Erasseri Pathayapurayil Radhakrishnan Nair AVSM VSM	Indian Air Force	3837 F(N)	26 January 1984
326	Air Marshal	Denis Arthur La Fontaine AVSM VM	Indian Air Force	3844 F(P)	26 January 1984
327	Air Marshal	Jagjit Singh Sandhanwalia VSM	Indian Air Force	3810 AE(M)	26 January 1984
328	Major General	Aravind Moreshwar Joglekar	Indian Army	IC-2352 (Engineers)	26 January 1984
329	Major General	Rajendra Keshavrao Gupte	Indian Army	IC-2390 (Signals)	26 January 1984
330	Major General	Amar Singh Sehgal	Indian Army	IC-4022 (AOC)	26 January 1984
331	Major General	Misbah Mayadas	Indian Army	IC-5102 (Armoured Corps)	26 January 1984
332	Major General	Sami Khan SM	Indian Army	IC-5376 (Infantry)	26 January 1984
333	Air Vice Marshal	Madan Lal Sethi AVSM	Indian Air Force	4009 F(N)	26 January 1984
334	Air Vice Marshal	Johnny William Greene AVSM VrC VM	Indian Air Force	4093 F(P)	26 January 1984
335	Air Vice Marshal	Jugal Kishor Kapur AVSM VSM	Indian Air Force	4044 AE(M)	26 January 1984
336	Lieutenant General	Bhupindar Singh	Indian Army	IC-2257 (Artillery)	26 January 1985
337	Lieutenant General	Kanwar Chiman Singh	Indian Army	IC-2276 (Infantry)	26 January 1985
338	Lieutenant General	Mohan Lal Tuli	Indian Army	IC-2355 (Infantry)	26 January 1985
339	Lieutenant General	Himmeth Singh	Indian Army	IC-4665 (Infantry)	26 January 1985
340	Lieutenant General	Codanda Nanjappa Somanna	Indian Army	IC-4471 (AOC)	26 January 1985
341	Lieutenant General	Jagdish Raj Malhotra AVSM	Indian Army	IC-3964 (Artillery)	26 January 1985
342	Lieutenant General	Rajindar Singh	Indian Army	IC-4525 (Artillery)	26 January 1985
343	Lieutenant General	Pran Nath Kathpalia AVSM	Indian Army	IC-4528 (Infantry-Kumaon Regiment)	26 January 1985
344	Lieutenant General	Jagat Mohan Vohra SM	Indian Army	IC-4767 (Armoured Corps)	26 January 1985
345	Lieutenant General	Kumar Mahipat Sinhji	Indian Army	IC-5095 (Infantry)	26 January 1985
346	Lieutenant General	Ananta Narayanan Ramasubramaniam	Indian Army	MR-371 (Medical)	26 January 1985
347	Major General	Tirath Singh Verma	Indian Army	IC-4566 (Infantry)	26 January 1985
348	Major General	Ravinder Nath Kapoor	Indian Army	IC-5132 (Artillery)	26 January 1985
349	Major General	Mahendra Nath Rawat (Ret'd)	Indian Army	IC-4779 (Infantry)	26 January 1985
350	Major General	Karam Singh SM	Indian Army	IC-5839 (Infantry)	26 January 1985
351	Major General	Jagdish Narayan VSM	Indian Army	MR-0597 (Medical)	26 January 1985
352	Major General	Baldev Rai Prashar AVSM	Indian Army	IC-19384 (JAG)	26 January 1985
353	Vice Admiral	Narendra Bhalla AVSM	Indian Navy	40010-F	26 January 1985
354	Vice Admiral	Jayant Ganpat Nadkarni AVSM NM VSM	Indian Navy	00086-W	26 January 1985
355	Air Marshal	Prem Pal Singh MVC AVSM	Indian Air Force	3871 F(P)	26 January 1985
356	Air Marshal	Subramaniam Raghavendran AVSM	Indian Air Force	3840 F(P)	26 January 1985
357	Air Marshal	Puran Singh Bajwa	Indian Air Force	3520 (Medical)	26 January 1985
358	Air Vice Marshal	Narayanan Krishnan Nair VSM (Ret'd)	Indian Air Force	4075 AE(E)	26 January 1985
359	Air Vice Marshal	Daya Shanker Mishra AVSM VSM (Ret'd)	Indian Air Force	4067 AE(M)	26 January 1985
360	Lieutenant General	Ashoka Kumar Handoo	Indian Army	IC-4502 (Infantry)	26 January 1986
361	Lieutenant General	Kul Bhushan Mehta	Indian Army	IC-4509 (Infantry)	26 January 1986
362	Lieutenant General	Prem Nath Hoon AVSM SM	Indian Army	IC-4591 (Infantry)	26 January 1986
363	Lieutenant General	Palakkal Erasa Menon	Indian Army	IC-4831 (Artillery)	26 January 1986
364	Lieutenant General	Jageshwar Nath Singh	Indian Army	IC-4518 (ASC)	26 January 1986
365	Lieutenant General	Sushil Kumar	Indian Army	IC-4012 (EME)	26 January 1986
366	Lieutenant General	Rattan Kumar Dhawan	Indian Army	IC-3968 (Engineers)	26 January 1986
367	Lieutenant General	Jitinder Sud	Indian Army	IC-4116 (Artillery)	26 January 1986
368	Lieutenant General	Vishwa Nath Sharma AVSM	Indian Army	IC-4769 (Armoured Corps)	26 January 1986
369	Lieutenant General	Bharat Bhushan Sehgal	Indian Army	IC-5304 (Infantry)	26 January 1986
370	Vice Admiral	Gulab Mohanlal Hiranandani AVSM NM	Indian Navy	00123-F	26 January 1986
371	Vice Admiral	Sukhmal Jain AVSM NM	Indian Navy	00130-W	26 January 1986
372	Vice Admiral	Lajpat Rai Mehta AVSM	Indian Navy	50011-K	26 January 1986
373	Air Marshal	Ripu Daman Sahni AVSM	Indian Air Force	3867 F(P)	26 January 1986
374	Air Marshal	Vir Narain	Indian Air Force	4007 F(N)	26 January 1986
375	Air Marshal	Man Mohan Singh AVSM VrC	Indian Air Force	4023 F(P)	26 January 1986
376	Air Marshal	Kuldip Singh Bhatia AVSM & bar	Indian Air Force	4139 AE (Electronics)	26 January 1986
377	Major General	Krishan Kumar Sudan	Indian Army	IC-5144 (Artillery)	26 January 1986
378	Major General	Kartar Singh Gill	Indian Army	IC-5956 (Artillery)	26 January 1986
379	Major General	Anthony Cajetan d'Silva	Indian Army	IC-5993 (Artillery)	26 January 1986
380	Major General	Shiv Kumar Sharma	Indian Army	IC-6416 (Infantry)	26 January 1986
381	Major General	Bachittar Singh	Indian Army	IC-5113 (Infantry)	26 January 1986
382	Major General	Yogendra Singh Tomar	Indian Army	IC-6615 (Infantry)	26 January 1986
383	Major General	Satya Pal Sethi AVSM	Indian Army	IC-5321 (Signals)	26 January 1986
384	Major General	Vijay Kumar Sood AVSM	Indian Army	IC-6636 (Infantry)	26 January 1986
385	Major General	Prabhakar Kashinath Joglekar	Indian Army	IC-5343 (Signals)	26 January 1986
386	Major General	Surindur Kumar (Malhotra)	Indian Army	IC-6631 (ASC)	26 January 1986
387	Major General	Harbhajan Singh	Indian Army	MR-783 (Medical)	26 January 1986
388	Air Vice Marshal	Chotey Lal Gupta	Indian Air Force	5027 (Accounts)	26 January 1986
389	Lieutenant General	Jitendra Kumar Puri AVSM	Indian Army	IC-4472 (Artillery)	26 January 1987
390	Lieutenant General	Anand Sarup MVC	Indian Army	IC-4501 (Infantry)	26 January 1987
391	Lieutenant General	Rajendra Pal Singh	Indian Army	IC-4801 (Signals)	26 January 1987
392	Lieutenant General	Tripat Singh AVSM	Indian Army	IC-5892 (EME)	26 January 1987
393	Lieutenant General	Nuggahalli Srinivasa Iyengar Narahari	Indian Army	IC-7505 (Engineers)	26 January 1987
394	Lieutenant General	Inder Mohan Ahuja	Indian Army	MR-616 (AMC)	26 January 1987
395	Lieutenant General	Ram Labhaya Kapur	Indian Army	IC-7264 (EME)	26 January 1987
396	Lieutenant General	Biddanda Chengappa Nanda AVSM	Indian Army	IC-5310 (Infantry)	26 January 1987
397	Lieutenant General	Kuldip Singh Brar AVSM VrC	Indian Army	IC-6732 (Infantry)	26 January 1987
398	Major General	Jagdish Singh Jamwal	Indian Army	IC-6419 (Infantry)	26 January 1987
399	Major General	Jagdish Chander Sachdeva	Indian Army	IC-8733 (Engineers)	26 January 1987
400	Brigadier	Jal Master VSM	Indian Army	IC-12071 (Infantry)	26 January 1987
401	Vice Admiral	Inder Jit Singh Khurana	Indian Navy	00072-N	26 January 1987
402	Vice Admiral	Surinder Mohan Gadihoke	Indian Navy	00126-K	26 January 1987
403	Vice Admiral	Subhash Chandra Chopra AVSM NM	Indian Navy	00131-Y	26 January 1987
404	Vice Admiral	Bhalchandra Ganesh Mudholkar AVSM (Ret'd)	Indian Navy	50008-B	26 January 1987
405	Air Marshal	Chandrakant Shantaram Raje AVSM	Indian Air Force	4038 F(P)	26 January 1987
406	Air Marshal	Surendra Kumar Mehra AVSM VM	Indian Air Force	4197 F(P)	26 January 1987
407	Air Marshal	Nirmal Chandra Suri AVSM VM	Indian Air Force	4236 F(P)	26 January 1987
408	Air Marshal	Pynammoottil Simon George AVSM	Indian Air Force	4240 F(P)	26 January 1987
409	Air Marshal	Gyanendra Nath Kunzru AVSM	Indian Air Force	MR-00600H (AMC)	26 January 1987
410	Air Marshal	Brijpal Singh Sikand AVSM (Ret'd)	Indian Air Force	3947 F(P)	26 January 1987
411	Lieutenant General	Depinder Singh VSM	Indian Army	IC-5169 (Infantry)	26 January 1988
412	Lieutenant General	Sunith Francis Rodrigues VSM	Indian Army	IC-6119 (Artillery)	26 January 1988
413	Lieutenant General	Sukhmoy Mazumdar VSM	Indian Army	IC-5821 (Engineers)	26 January 1988
414	Lieutenant General	Prem Singh Vadehra	Indian Army	IC-5330 (Infantry)	26 January 1988
415	Lieutenant General	Kirpal Singh Randhawa AVSM	Indian Army	IC-5987 (Armoured Corps)	26 January 1988
416	Lieutenant General	Robindra Sarin	Indian Army	IC-4922 (AOC)	26 January 1988
417	Lieutenant General	Kanwar Mahendra Singh	Indian Army	IC-5322 (Infantry)	26 January 1988
418	Vice Admiral	Laxminarayan Ram Das AVSM VrC VSM	Indian Navy	00132-Z	26 January 1988
419	Vice Admiral	Shri Bans Narayan Singh AVSM	Indian Navy	50023-N	26 January 1988
420	Air Marshal	Jagdish Kumar Seth AVSM VM	Indian Air Force	4403 F(P)	26 January 1988
421	Air Marshal	Partha Kumar Dey AVSM	Indian Air Force	4404 F(P)	26 January 1988
422	Air Marshal	Krishnaswamy Subramanian AVSM VM	Indian Air Force	4213 F(N)	26 January 1988
423	Air Marshal	Man Mohan Sinha AVSM VM	Indian Air Force	4408 F(P)	26 January 1988
424	Lieutenant General	Ashoke Kumar Chatterjee VSM	Indian Army	IC-6008 (Infantry)	26 January 1989
425	Lieutenant General	Raj Mohan Vohra MVC	Indian Army	IC-6121 (Armoured Corps)	26 January 1989
426	Lieutenant General	Lakshman Singh Rawat AVSM (Ret'd)	Indian Army	IC-5316 (Infantry)	26 January 1989
427	Lieutenant General	Vijay Kumar	Indian Army	IC-5319 (ASC)	26 January 1989
428	Lieutenant General	Diwan Siri Ram Sahni SM	Indian Army	IC-7314 (Engineers)	26 January 1989
429	Lieutenant General	Sushil Kumar Pillai	Indian Army	IC-7325 (Infantry)	26 January 1989
430	Lieutenant General	Satish Kumar Bahri	Indian Army	IC-6117 (Artillery)	26 January 1989
431	Lieutenant General	Krishan Dass Kapur (Ret'd)	Indian Army	MR-0610 (AMC)	26 January 1989
432	Major General	Naresh Kumar PVSM (Ret'd)	Indian Army	IC-5844 (Artillery)	26 January 1989
433	Vice Admiral	Ravi Prakash Sawhney	Indian Navy	00136-H	26 January 1989
434	Vice Admiral	Radhey Shyam Sharma AVSM VSM	Indian Navy	60027-Z	26 January 1989
435	Vice Admiral	Jagat Narayan Sukul AVSM	Indian Navy	50027-Y	26 January 1989
436	Air Marshal	Prithi Singh AVSM	Indian Air Force	4480 F(P)	26 January 1989
437	Air Marshal	Mohinder Singh Bawa AVSM VM	Indian Air Force	4494 F(P)	26 January 1989
438	Air Marshal	Gursharan Singh AVSM VM VSM (Ret'd)	Indian Air Force	4263 AE(M)	26 January 1989
439	Air Vice Marshal	Denzil Keelor KC AVSM VrC	Indian Air Force	4805 F(P)	26 January 1989

== See also ==
- List of Param Vishisht Seva Medal recipients (1960–1969)
- List of Param Vishisht Seva Medal recipients (1970–1979)
- List of Param Vishisht Seva Medal recipients (1990–1999)
- List of Param Vishisht Seva Medal recipients (2000–2009)
- List of Param Vishisht Seva Medal recipients (2010–2019)
- List of Param Vishisht Seva Medal recipients (2020–2029)
