= Ashwani Kumar Channan =

Retired artillery officer of Indian Army

Major General Ashwani Kumar Channan PVSM, SM
- Military career
- Allegiance: India
- Branch: Indian Army
- Service years: August 1983 – August 2020
- Rank: Major general
- Service number: IC-41960N
- Unit: Regiment of Artillery
- Awards: Param Vishisht Seva Medal; Sena Medal

Maj Gen AK Channan, PVSM, SM, VSM is a retired artillery officer of the Indian Army. He served for 38 years and held various command and staff appointments in operational areas. He also served in the Direcorate of Perspective Planning at Army Headquarters and was the first ADG of Army Design Bureau.

== Career ==
He is an alumnus of National Defence Academy, Khadakvasala, and National Defence College, Delhi. He is graduated from the DSSC, Wellington. and completed the HC from AWC, Mhow. He is a prolific writer.

He was GSO 1 in Counter Insurgency area and in the Directorate of PP at Army Headquarters. He served as a Colonel Adm and Colonel MS of a Div, DDG P& M Cell and was the ADG of Perspective Planning & ADB. He retired on 31 August 2020.

== Awards and decorations ==
During his military career of 38 years, he has been awarded Param Vishist Sewa Medal in 2020 and Sena Medal in 2015.

Param Vishist Seva Medal	Sena Medal		
Samanya Seva Medal	Special Service Medal	Operation Vijay Star	Operation Vijay Medal
Operation Parakram Medal	Sainya Seva Medal	High Altitude Service Medal	Videsh Seva Medal
50th Anniversary of Independence Medal	30 Years Long Service Medal	20 Years Long Service Medal	9 Years Long Service Medal
