= Narayan Menon =

Air Marshal Narayan Menon (born 27 September 1944) was a former Air Officer-in-Charge (Personnel) with the Indian Air Force. He was commissioned on 24 December 1964. He received Ati Vishisht Seva Medal on 26 January 1998, Uttam Yudh Seva Medal on 15 August 1999 and Param Vishisht Seva Medal on 26 January 2004.
