= Lieutenant general (India) =

Three-star general officer rank in the Indian Army

Lieutenant general लेफ्टीनेंट जनरल
- Flag of a lieutenant general

- Rank insignia of a lieutenant general

- Vehicle star plate of lieutenant general
- Country: India
- Service branch: Indian Army
- Abbreviation: Lt Gen
- Rank group: General officer
- Rank: Three-star rank
- NATO rank code: OF 8
- Pay grade: Pay level 15,16,17
- Next higher rank: General
- Next lower rank: Major general
- Equivalent ranks: Vice admiral (Indian Navy); Air marshal (Indian Air Force)

Lieutenant general is a three-star general officer rank in the Indian Army. It is the second-highest active rank in the Indian Army. Lieutenant generals rank above the two-star rank of Major General and below the four-star rank of General, which is held by the Chief of the Army Staff.

The equivalent rank in the Indian Navy is Vice Admiral and in the Indian Air Force is Air Marshal.

Officers in the rank of lieutenant general hold important appointments at the army commands and at the army headquarters.

== Army commanders (C-in-C grade) ==
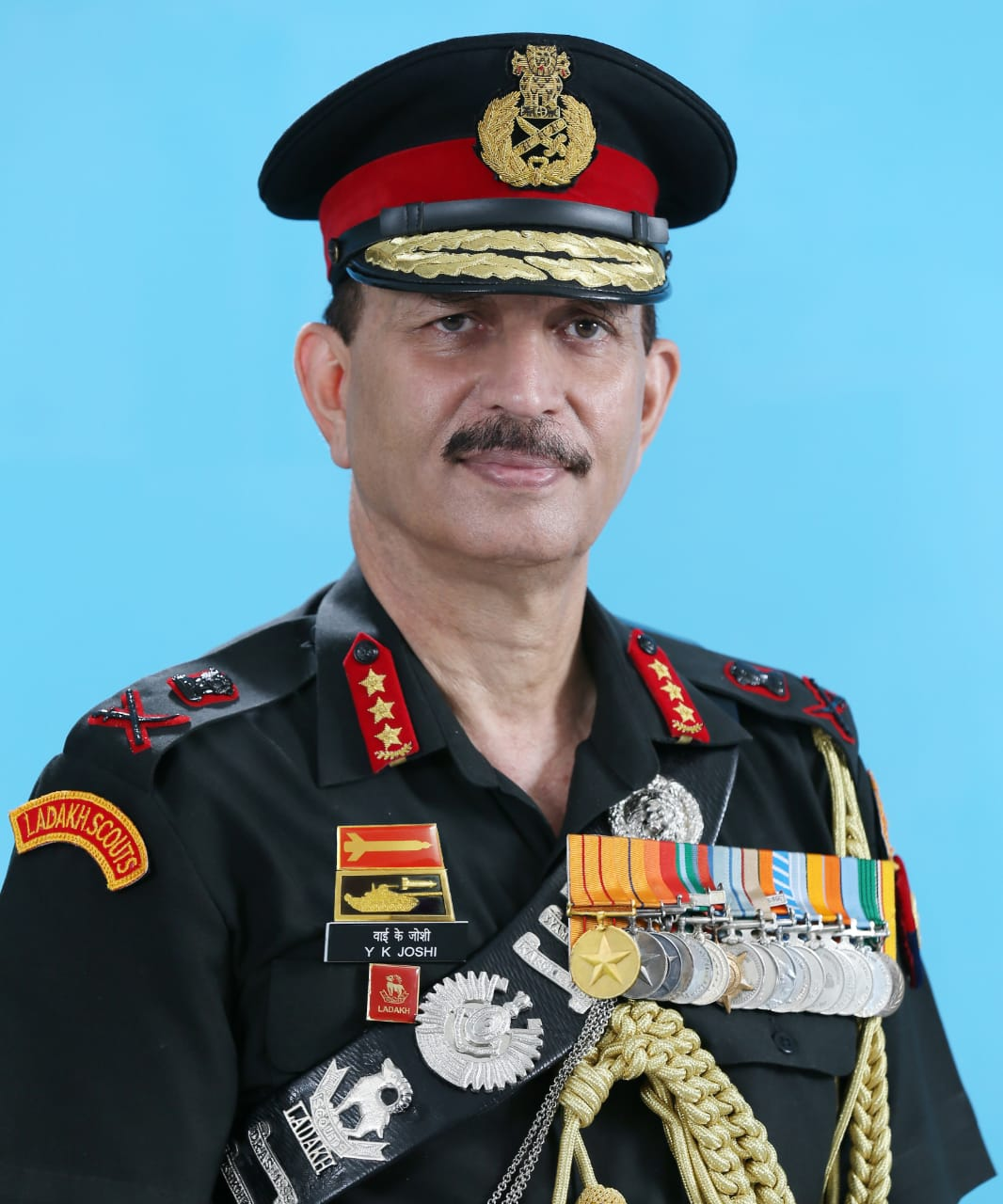
Lieutenant General Y K Joshi in uniform

Senior lieutenant generals who are in the C-in-C grade (army commanders), are considered to be in a grade higher than other lieutenant generals. They hold the most senior appointments like the Vice Chief of the Army Staff and the heads of the seven army commands (styled general officer commanding-in-chief). The seven GOC-in-C appointments are:

- General Officer Commanding-in-Chief Central Command
- General Officer Commanding-in-Chief Eastern Command
- General Officer Commanding-in-Chief Northern Command
- General Officer Commanding-in-Chief Southern Command
- General Officer Commanding-in-Chief South Western Command
- General Officer Commanding-in-Chief Western Command
- General Officer Commanding-in-Chief Army Training Command

== Insignia ==
The badges of rank have a crossed sword and baton and Ashoka emblem above.

A lieutenant general wears gorget patches which are crimson patches with three golden stars. Army commanders in the C-in-C grade have additional oak leaves under the three golden stars.

== Appointments ==
Officers in the rank of Lieutenant general hold important appointments like general officer commanding a corps. The Indian Army has 14 corps. The general officer commanding areas are also officers of the rank of Lieutenant general. Areas are static formations which consist of sub-areas. At army headquarters, the principal staff officers (PSO) are senior lieutenant generals. The Heads of Combat and Combat Support Arms, Heads of services and directorates (Director General) are officers of the rank of lieutenant general. The chiefs of staff of the seven commands of the Army are also of the rank of lieutenant general.

== Order of precedence ==
A lieutenant general in the C-in-C grade ranks at No. 23 on the Indian order of precedence, along with vice admirals of the Indian Navy and air marshals of the Indian Air Force in the C-in-C grade. The other lieutenant generals rank at No. 24 in the order of precedence.

Lieutenant generals in the C-in-C grade are at the apex pay scale (pay level 17), with a monthly pay of ₹225,000 (US$3,100). Other lieutenant generals, in the HAG+ pay scale (pay level 16) draw lesser, depending on the years in service. However, since they should not draw equivalent or more than the next higher level, the remuneration is capped at ₹224,400.

== See also ==
- List of serving generals of the Indian Army
- Army ranks and insignia of India
- General officer commanding
