= Manjinder Singh (general) =

Retired Lieutenant General of the Indian Army

Lieutenant General Manjinder Singh PVSM AVSM YSM VSM
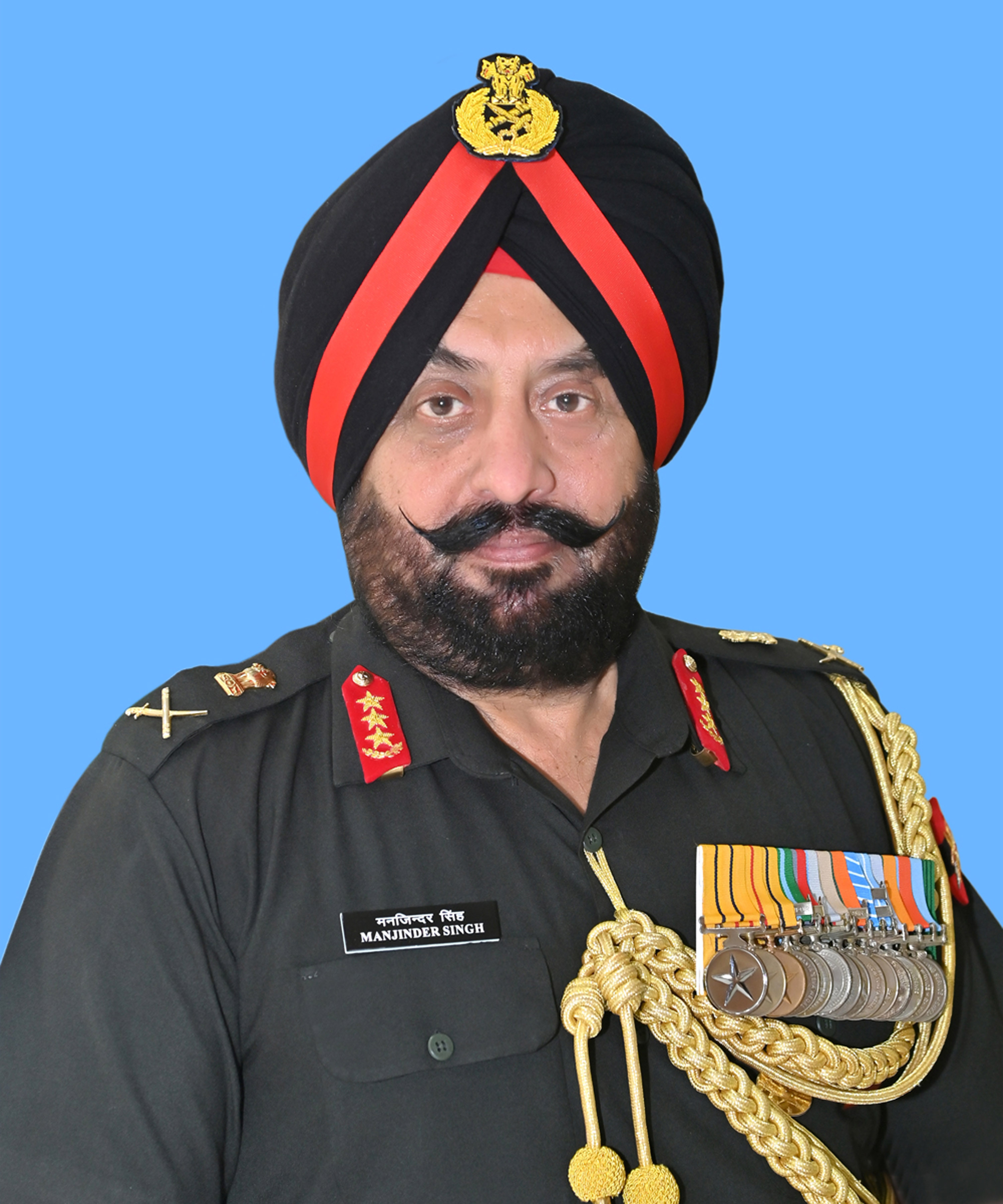

General Officer Commanding-in-Chief South Western Command
- In office 1 July 2024 – 30 June 2026
- Chief of Army Staff: Upendra Dwivedi
- Preceded by: Dhiraj Seth
- Succeeded by: Mohit Malhotra

General Officer Commanding-in-Chief Army Training Command
- In office 1 December 2023 – 30 June 2024
- Chief of Army Staff: Manoj Pande
- Preceded by: Surinder Singh Mahal
- Succeeded by: Devendra Sharma

Military service
- Allegiance: India
- Branch/service: Indian Army
- Years of service: 20 December 1986 – 30 June 2026
- Rank: Lieutenant General
- Unit: 19 Madras Regiment
- Commands: South Western Command; Army Training Command; XVI Corps; Indian Military Training Team; 19 Madras Regiment
- Battles/wars: Operation Meghdoot; Operation Rakshak
- Service number: IC-44065N
- Awards: Param Vishisht Seva Medal; Ati Vishisht Seva Medal; Yudh Seva Medal; Vishisht Seva Medal

Lieutenant general Manjinder Singh, PVSM, AVSM, YSM, VSM is a retired general officer of the Indian Army. He last served as the General Officer Commanding-in-Chief South Western Command. He previously held the appointment of General Officer Commanding-in-Chief Army Training Command. He earlier served as the Deputy Chief of Integrated Defence Staff (Policy Planning & Force Development) at HQ IDS, prior to this he was General Officer Commanding XVI Corps. He also served as Chief of Staff, Western Command.

== Early life and education ==
The general officer is an alumnus of Sainik School, Kapurthala. He then attended the National Defence Academy, Khadakwasla and the Indian Military Academy, Dehradun. He obtained other military courses from various institutions such as Defence Services Staff College, Higher Command Course and National Defence College of Thailand.

== Military career ==
He was commissioned into 19th Battalion of the Madras Regiment on 20 December 1986 from the Indian Military Academy. In his lengthy military career spanning over 30 years, he has the distinction of tenanting notable command and staff appointments in Jammu & Kashmir and on the Western Front. He commanded his battalion in a counter-insurgency environment in Jammu and Kashmir, and tenanted varied staff appointments in Corps and Commands along the Western Front. He was also appointed as a commanding officer for Insurgency in Jammu and Kashmir, infantry brigade at the Line of Control (LOC) and an Infantry Division as part of Strike Corps. and a Corps deployed along Line of Control in Counter Insurgency Operations in J&K. The General Officer has tenanted varied staff appointments in Corps and Commands along the Western Front and in the Counter Insurgency Operations environment. The general Officer has also been as an instructor at the Indian Military Academy and Commandant Indian Military Training Team Bhutan. He has also served as the MGGS (Ops) at Headquarters of the Western Command

After being promoted to the rank of Lieutenant General, he was appointed as the Chief of Staff of the Western Command. On 29 October 2021, he took over as the General Officer Commanding of White Knight Corps (XVI) from Lieutenant General M.V. Suchindra Kumar. A year later on 4 Jan 2023, he assumed the appointment of Deputy Chief of Integrated Defence Staff (Policy Planning & Force Development) at the Integrated Defence Staff.

On 1 December 2023, he took over as the General Officer Commanding-in-Chief Army Training Command succeeding Lieutenant General Surinder Singh Mahal, who superannuated on 30 November 2023. On 1 July 2024, Lieutenant General Manjinder Singh took over as General Officer Commanding-in-Chief South Western Command succeeding Lieutenant General Dhiraj Seth who moved to Southern Command as an Army Commander.

== Awards and decorations ==
During his career, the general officer was awarded with the Param Vishisht Seva Medal in 2026, the Ati Vishisht Seva Medal in 2024, the Yudh Seva Medal in 2015 and the Vishisht Seva Medal in 2019.

Param Vishisht Seva Medal	Ati Vishisht Seva Medal	Yudh Seva Medal	Vishisht Seva Medal
Samanya Seva Medal	Special Service Medal	Operation Vijay Medal	Operation Parakram Medal
Sainya Seva Medal	High Altitude Medal	Videsh Seva Medal	75th Independence Anniversary Medal
50th Independence Anniversary Medal	30 Years Long Service Medal	20 Years Long Service Medal	9 Years Long Service Medal

== Dates of rank ==
Insignia	Rank	Component	Date of rank
	Second Lieutenant	Indian Army	20 December 1986
	Lieutenant	Indian Army	20 December 1988
	Captain	Indian Army	20 December 1991
	Major	Indian Army	20 December 1997
	Lieutenant-Colonel	Indian Army	16 December 2004
	Colonel	Indian Army	1 May 2007
	Brigadier	Indian Army	24 December 2012 (acting); 1 October 2013 (substantive, with seniority from 26 June 2011)
	Major General	Indian Army	1 December 2018 (seniority from 1 February 2017)
	Lieutenant-General	Indian Army	10 February 2021

Military offices
Preceded by Yogendra Dimri	Chief of Staff, Western Command; 1 April 2021 - 18 October 2021	Succeeded by Devendra Sharma
Preceded by M. V. Suchindra Kumar	General Officer Commanding XVI Corps; 29 October 2021 - 23 December 2022	Succeeded by Sandeep Jain
Preceded by Atulya Solankey	Deputy Chief of Integrated Defence Staff) (Policy Planning & Force Development); 4 January 2023 - 30 November 2023	Succeeded by Sanjay Vatsayan
Preceded by Surinder Singh Mahal	General Officer Commanding-in-Chief Army Training Command; 1 December 2023 - 30 June 2024	Succeeded by Devendra Sharma
Preceded by Dhiraj Seth	General Officer Commanding-in-Chief South Western Command; 1 July 2024 - 30 June 2026	Succeeded by Mohit Malhotra
