= Mohit Malhotra (general) =

Lieutenant General in the Indian Army

Lieutenant General Mohit Malhotra AVSM SM
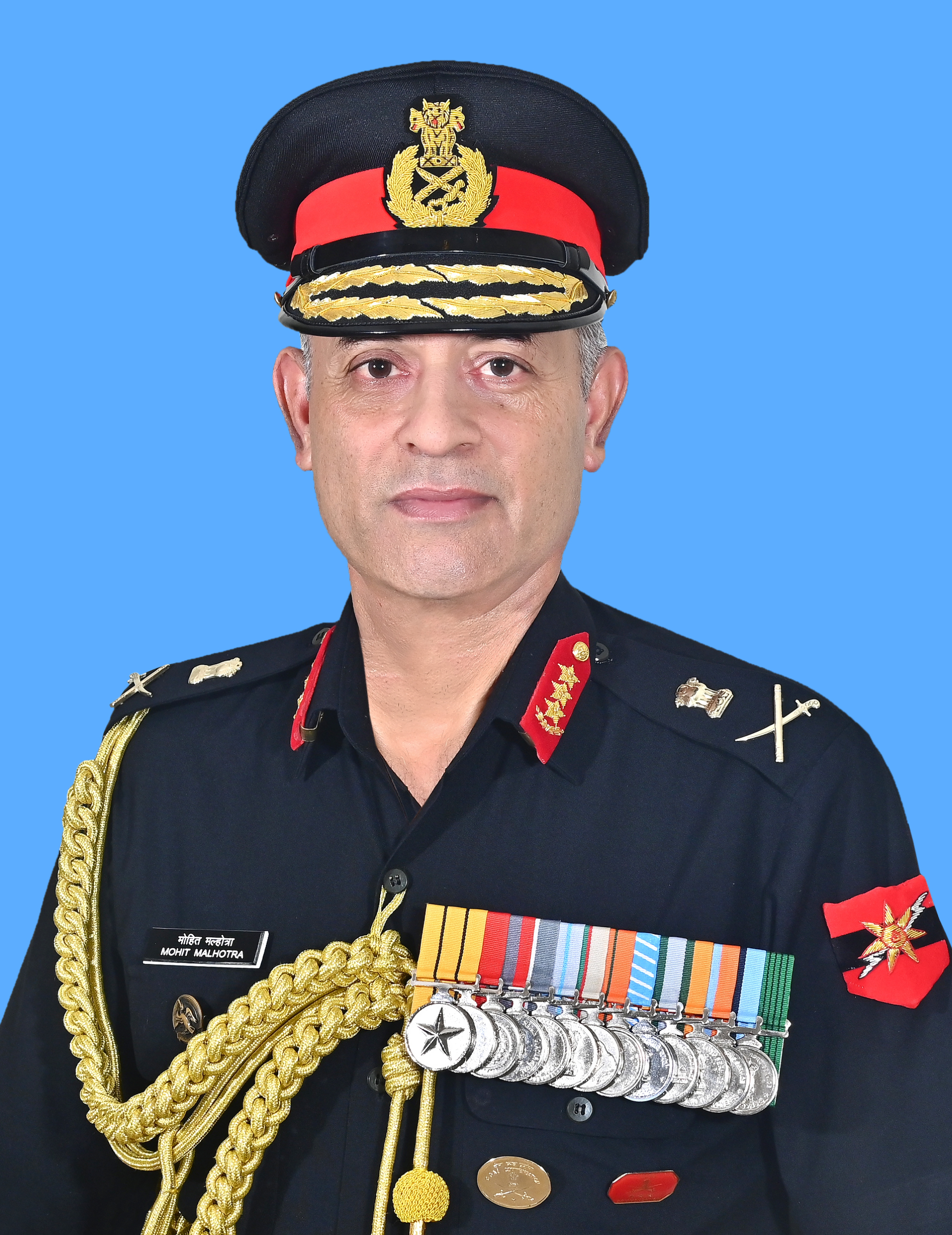
- Official portrait, 2026

General Officer Commanding-in-Chief South Western Command
- Incumbent
- Assumed office 1 July 2026
- Chief of Army Staff: Dhiraj Seth
- Preceded by: Manjinder Singh

Military service
- Allegiance: India
- Branch/service: Indian Army
- Years of service: 10 June 1989 – Present
- Rank: Lieutenant General
- Unit: 47 Armoured Regiment
- Commands: South Western Command; XII Corps; 1 Armoured Division
- Service number: IC-48518L
- Awards: Ati Vishisht Seva Medal; Sena Medal

Lieutenant General Mohit Malhotra, AVSM, SM is a serving general officer of the Indian Army. He is currently serving as the General Officer Commanding-in-Chief, South Western Command. He was previously serving as the Chief of Staff of Eastern Command, prior to that he was General Officer Commanding, XII Corps. He earlier served as Additional Director General Strategic Communication. He is also the Colonel of the Regiment of the Armoured Corps.

== Early life and education ==
He is an alumnus of the National Defence Academy, Khadakwasla and the Indian Military Academy, Dehradun. He is also a graduate of the Advanced Command and Staff Course, United Kingdom. He holds two Masters in Defence Studies, including one from King's College, London, in addition to two M Phil degrees in Political Science & Defence and Strategic Studies.

== Military career ==
The general officer was commissioned into the 47th Armoured Regiment on 10 June 1989 from the Indian Military Academy. In a career spanning over three decades he has held numerous command and staff appointments. He has commanded the 47 Armoured Regiment, an Independent Armoured Brigade and was General Officer Commanding 1 Armoured Division (Airawat Division). His staff assignments include serving in an infantry brigade, a strike corps and an operational command. He has also served as the Additional Director General Strategic Communication at the Army Headquarters, New Delhi.

After promotion to the rank of Lieutenant General, on 9 June 2023, he took over as General Officer Commanding, XII Corps succeeding Lieutenant General Rakesh Kapoor. He relinquished the command on 15 June 2025 and assumed the appointment of Chief of Staff, Eastern Command.

A year later, On 1 July 2026, Lieutenant General Malhotra took over as the General Officer Commanding-in-Chief, South Western Command succeeding Lieutenant General Manjinder Singh when the latter superannuated on 30 June 2026.

== Awards and decorations ==
The general officer has been awarded with the Ati Vishisht Seva Medal in 2023 and the Sena Medal. He has also received the Chief of Army Staff Commendation and Army Commander Commendation.

Ati Vishisht Seva Medal		Sena Medal	
Special Service Medal	Siachen Glacier Medal		Operation Vijay Medal
Operation Parakram Medal	Sainya Seva Medal	High Altitude Medal	75th Independence Anniversary Medal
50th Independence Anniversary Medal	30 Years Long Service Medal	20 Years Long Service Medal	9 Years Long Service Medal

== Dates of rank ==
Insignia	Rank	Component	Date of rank
	Second Lieutenant	Indian Army	10 June 1989
	Lieutenant	Indian Army	10 June 1991
	Captain	Indian Army	10 June 1994
	Major	Indian Army	10 June 2000
	Lieutenant Colonel	Indian Army	16 December 2004
	Colonel	Indian Army	1 May 2009
	brigadier	Indian Army	1 June 2016 (acting) 12 November 2016 (substantive with seniority from 8 July 2014)
	Major General	Indian Army	4 December 2020 (seniority from 19 July 2019)
	Lieutenant General	Indian Army	9 June 2023

Military offices
Preceded by Manjinder Singh	General Officer Commanding-in-Chief South Western Command; 1 July 2026 - Present	Succeeded by Incumbent
Preceded by R. C. Srikanth	Chief of Staff, Eastern Command; 17 June 2025 - 30 June 2026	Succeeded by Gambhir Singh
Preceded by Rakesh Kapoor	General Officer Commanding XII Corps; 9 June 2023 – 15 June 2025	Succeeded by Aditya Vikram Singh Rathee
