= Surinder Singh Mahal =

Retired Army General Officer

Lieutenant General Surinder Singh Mahal PVSM, AVSM, VSM
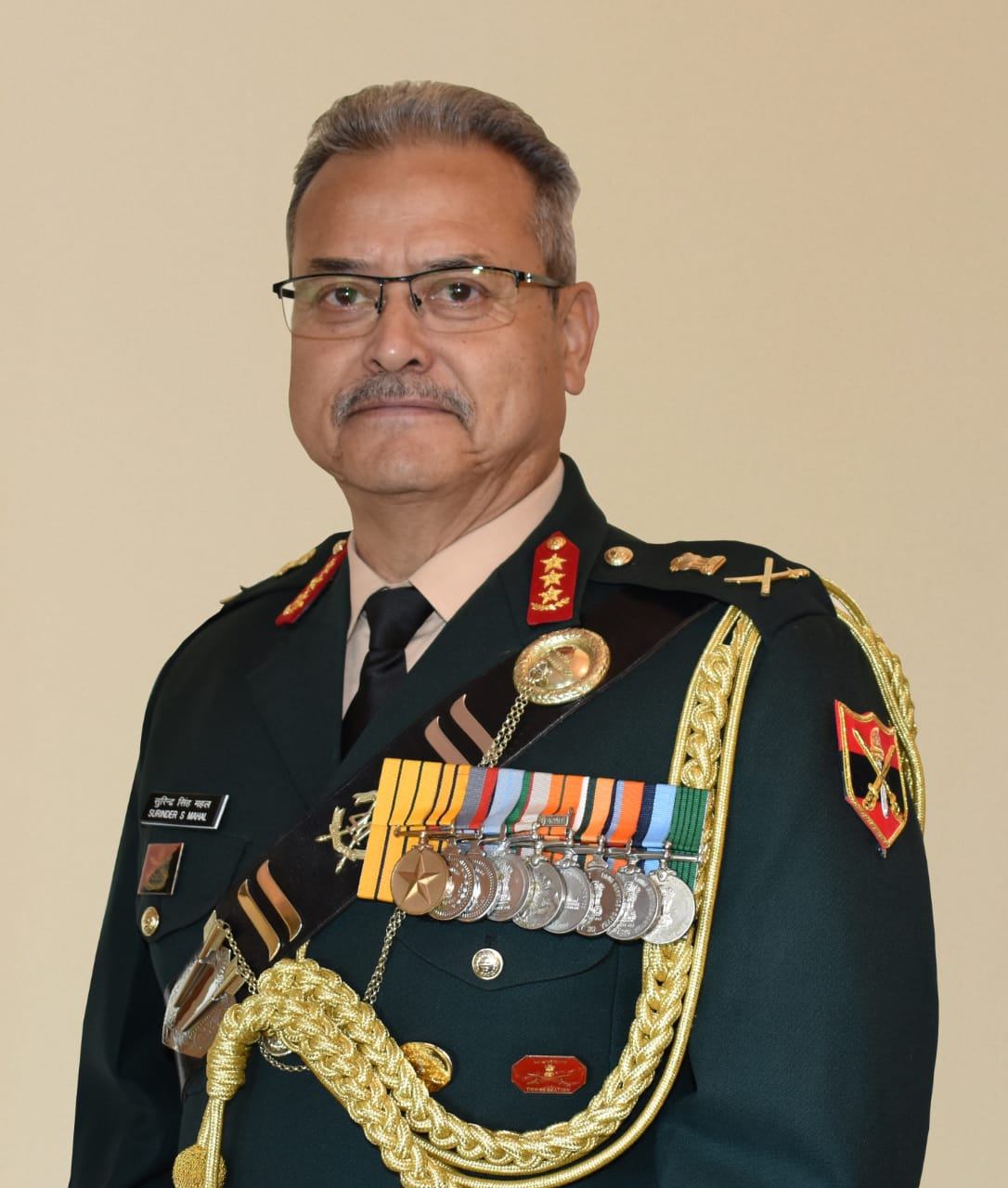
- Military career
- Allegiance: India
- Branch: Indian Army
- Service years: December 1984 – November 2023
- Rank: Lieutenant General
- Service number: IC-42387P
- Unit: 41st Armoured Regiment
- Commands: Army Training Command; Uttar Bharat Area; II Corps
- Awards: Param Vishisht Seva Medal; Ati Vishisht Seva Medal; Vishisht Seva Medal

Lieutenant General Surinder Singh Mahal PVSM AVSM VSM is a retired general officer in the Indian Army who served as the General Officer Commanding-in-Chief of the Army Training Command (ARTRAC). He superannuated on 30 November 2023.

== Biography ==
From Kathgarh village in Nawanshahar District, Punjab, Mahal is an alumnus of National Defence Academy, Khadakwasla, Pune and Indian Military Academy, Dehradun. He was commissioned in the 41st Armoured Regiment in December 1984. After commanding II Corps at Ambala, he commanded the Uttar Bharat (UB) Area before his appointment as GOC-in-C, ARTRAC.

== Awards and decorations ==

Ati Vishisht Seva Medal	Vishisht Seva Medal		Special Service Medal
Operation Vijay Medal	Operation Parakram Medal	Sainya Seva Medal	75th Independence Anniversary Medal
50th Independence Anniversary Medal	30 Years Long Service Medal	20 Years Long Service Medal	9 Years Long Service Medal

== Dates of rank ==
Insignia	Rank	Component	Date of rank
	Second Lieutenant	Indian Army	15 December 1984
	Lieutenant	Indian Army	15 December 1986
	Captain	Indian Army	15 December 1989
	Major	Indian Army	15 December 1995
	Lieutenant-Colonel	Indian Army	16 December 2004
	Colonel	Indian Army	1 April 2006
	Brigadier	Indian Army	24 October 2011 (acting); 27 December 2011 (substantive, with seniority from 6 April 2010)
	Major General	Indian Army	27 March 2017 (seniority from 1 February 2015)
	Lieutenant-General	Indian Army	1 September 2019

Military offices
Preceded by Manmohan Jeet Singh Kahlon	General Officer Commanding II Corps; 3 February 2020 – 11 February 2021	Succeeded by N. S. Raja Subramani
Preceded by N. S. Raja Subramani	General Officer Commanding Uttar Bharat Area; February 2020 – March 2022	Succeeded by Johnson P Mathew
Preceded by Raj Shukla	General Officer Commanding-in-Chief Army Training Command; 1 April 2022 – 30 November 2023	Succeeded by Manjinder Singh
