= South Western Command (India) =

Indian army command

- Insignia of the South Western Command
- Active: 15 April 2005 - Present
- Country: India
- Branch: Indian Army
- Type: Command
- Garrison/HQ: Jaipur, Rajasthan
- Nickname: Sapta Shakti Command
- Mottos: Sarvada Vijayee Bhava transl. 'Forever Victorious'

Commanders
- GOC-in-C: Lt Gen Mohit Malhotra, AVSM SM
- Notable commanders: General Dhiraj Seth

Insignia
- Flag

The South Western Command of the Indian Army was established on 15 April 2005 and became fully operational on 15 August 2005. It was established in response to the emerging threats and opportunities on the Western Indo-Pak border and is headquartered at Jaipur, Rajasthan.

Lieutenant General Mohit Malhotra is the present South Western Army Commander who took over on 1 July 2026.

== History and Role ==
The South Western Command of the Indian Army was formally raised on 15 April 2005 as the seventh operational command, with its headquarters established at Jaipur Military Station in Rajasthan with Lieutenant General Krishnamurthy Nagaraj taking over as the first General Officer Commanding-in-Chief. This creation involved carving out sectors from the existing Western Command to enhance dedicated oversight of the arid western frontier, responding to evolving security dynamics along the Indo-Pak border. The South Western Command is operationally responsible for the defence of Southern Punjab and Northern Rajasthan.

== Structure ==
Currently, the South Western Command has been assigned operational units under:- X Corps and 42nd Artillery Division. The command in total has following units under its belt:- 3 infantry divisions (1 for Mountain warfare), 1 armoured division, 1 artillery division, 2 Reorganised Army Plains Infantry Division (RAPID), 1 armoured brigade, 1 Air-defence brigade, and 1 engineering brigade.

In 2021, except the 33 Armoured Division all the units of I Corps was transferred to Northern Command to focus on the Sino-Indian border at Ladakh.

Structure of South-Western Command
| Insignia | Corp | Corp HQ | General Officer Commanding | Assigned Units | Unit HQ |
|---|---|---|---|---|---|
| | X Corps (Chetak Corps) | Bathinda, Punjab | Lt Gen Vikrant Suresh Deshpande | 16 Infantry Division | Sri Ganganagar, Rajasthan |
| | X Corps (Chetak Corps) | Bathinda, Punjab | Lt Gen Vikrant Suresh Deshpande | 18 RAPID Division | Kota, Rajasthan |
| | X Corps (Chetak Corps) | Bathinda, Punjab | Lt Gen Vikrant Suresh Deshpande | 24 RAPID Division | Bikaner, Rajasthan |
| | X Corps (Chetak Corps) | Bathinda, Punjab | Lt Gen Vikrant Suresh Deshpande | 6 (Independent) Armoured Brigade | Bhatinda, Punjab |
| | X Corps (Chetak Corps) | Bathinda, Punjab | Lt Gen Vikrant Suresh Deshpande | 615 Air-defence Brigade | Agra, Uttar Pradesh |
| | X Corps (Chetak Corps) | Bathinda, Punjab | Lt Gen Vikrant Suresh Deshpande | 471 Engineering Brigade | N/A |
| N/A | N/A | N/A | N/A | 42 Artillery Division | Jaipur, Rajasthan |
| N/A | N/A | N/A | N/A | 33 Armoured Division | Hisar, Haryana |

== List of GOC-in-C of South Western Command ==
The following table chronicles the appointees as the General Officer Commanding-in-Chief, South Western Command.

| S.No | Rank | Name | Portrait | Assumed office | Left office | Unit of Commission | References |
|---|---|---|---|---|---|---|---|
| 1 | Lieutenant General | Krishnamurthy Nagaraj | | 15 April 2005 | 31 July 2006 | Maratha Light Infantry | |
| 2 | Lieutenant General | Parmendra Kumar Singh | | 1 August 2006 | 31 July 2008 | Regiment of Artillery | |
| 3 | Lieutenant General | Chanroth Kunnumal Suchindra Sabu | | 1 September 2008 | 30 November 2010 | Regiment of Artillery | |
| 4 | Lieutenant General | Shri Krishna Singh | | 1 December 2010 | 31 October 2011 | 8th Gorkha Rifles | |
| 5 | Lieutenant General | Gyan Bhushan | | 1 November 2011 | 31 December 2013 | Mahar Regiment | |
| 6 | Lieutenant General | Arun Kumar Sahni | | 1 January 2014 | 31 January 2016 | Regiment of Artillery | |
| 7 | Lieutenant General | Sarath Chand | | 1 February 2016 | 12 January 2017 | Garhwal Rifles | |
| 8 | Lieutenant General | Abhay Krishna | | 25 January 2017 | 31 July 2017 | Rajputana Rifles | |
| 9 | Lieutenant General | Cherish Mathson | | 1 August 2017 | 31 August 2019 | Garhwal Rifles | |
| 10 | Lieutenant General | Alok Singh Kler | | 1 September 2019 | 31 March 2021 | 68 Armoured Regiment | |
| 11 | Lieutenant General | Amardeep Singh Bhinder | | 1 April 2021 | 28 February 2023 | The Deccan Horse | |
| 12 | Lieutenant General | B. S. Raju | | 1 March 2023 | 31 October 2023 | Jat Regiment | |
| 13 | Lieutenant General | Dhiraj Seth | | 1 November 2023 | 30 June 2024 | 2nd Lancers (Gardner's Horse) | |
| 14 | Lieutenant General | Manjinder Singh | | 1 July 2024 | 30 June 2026 | Madras Regiment | |
| 15 | Lieutenant General | Mohit Malhotra | | 1 July 2026 | Incumbent | 47 Armoured Regiment | |

== Notes ==
1.Later promoted to the rank of General and to the post of Chief of the Army Staff.
