= XXI Corps (India) =

Military field formation of the Indian Army

- Indian Army XXI Corps Formation Sign
- Active: 1917-18; 1942–1943; 1990–present
- Country: (British Raj) British India; India
- Allegiance: British Empire; India
- Branch: British Indian Army; Indian Army
- Role: Strike Corps
- Size: Corps
- Part of: Southern Command
- Garrison/HQ: Bhopal
- Nickname: Sudarshan Chakra Corps
- Engagements: World War II

Commanders
- Current commander: Lt Gen Arvind Chauhan, YSM SM VSM
- Notable commanders: General Nirmal Chander Vij; Lieutenant General Syed Ata Hasnain; Lieutenant General Dhiraj Seth

The XXI Corps, or the Sudarshan Chakra Corps, is a strike corps of the Indian Army and is headquartered at Bhopal.

== World War I ==
The XXI Indian Corps was first raised on 12 August 1917 during the World War I, specifically for operations in the Middle East region against the German–Ottoman alliance. The corps was part of the Egyptian Expeditionary Force under Allenby and took active part in the capture of Gaza and Jerusalem from October to December 1917, and against the Turkish Seventh and Eight Armies in 1918. The Corps was disbanded in 1918, at the end of the war.

== World War II ==
The corps was re-raised in Persia on 6 June 1942 as a formation of the Indian Army during World War II. The corps was commanded throughout its existence by Lieutenant General Mosley Mayne and was part of the Tenth Army. The corps, composed of the 8th Indian Infantry Division (Major-General Dudley Russell) and the British 56th Infantry Division (Major-General Eric Miles), was created as part of the Allied buildup of forces in Persia and Iraq to create Persia and Iraq Command in order to prevent a German invasion of the Caucasus. The invasion never occurred and the corps was disbanded on 24 August 1943.

== Present ==
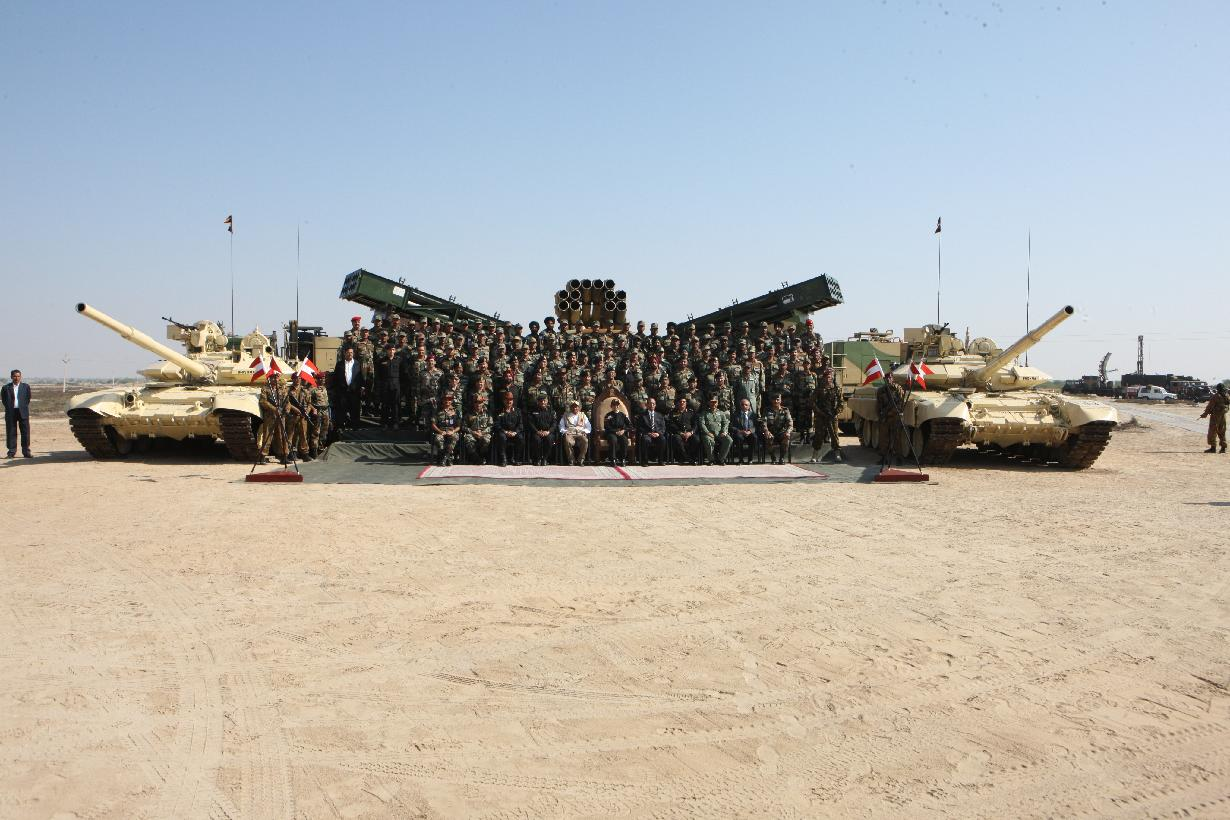
Exercise Sudarshan Shakti, 21 Corps, December 2011

After India's intervention in Sri Lanka, the provisional headquarters (HQ) controlling India's expeditionary force, HQ Indian Peace Keeping Force, became HQ XXI Corps in April 1990 at Chandimandir. Permanent retention of the Corps at Bhopal was authorised on 29 October 1990. It is the only strike corps in the Indian Army’s Pune based Southern Command, the other three being - I Corps, II Corps and XVII Corps. XXI corps functions as both a strike corps and would also be used if India were to make another large intervention overseas.

It currently consists of:

- 31 Armored Division (White Tiger Division) headquartered at Jhansi-Babina in Uttar Pradesh, Central India.
  - 94 Armoured Brigade
- 36 Infantry Division (RAPID) (Shahbaaz Division) at Sagar
  - Division Artillery Brigade at Talbehat (2001)
  - 18 Armoured Brigade at Gwalior (2001)
  - 72 Infantry Brigade at Gwalior
  - 115 Infantry Brigade was at Dhana.
- 54 Infantry Division (Bison Division) headquartered at Secunderabad. It includes -
  - 91 Infantry Brigade at Thiruvananthapuram (Amphibious)
  - 47 Infantry Brigade at Hyderabad
  - 76 Infantry Brigade at Secunderabad
- 41 Artillery Division (Agnibaaz Division) headquartered at Pune.
- Corps Artillery Brigade
- Corps Air Defence Brigade (First To Strike Brigade)
- 475 Engineering Brigade

== List of Commanders ==
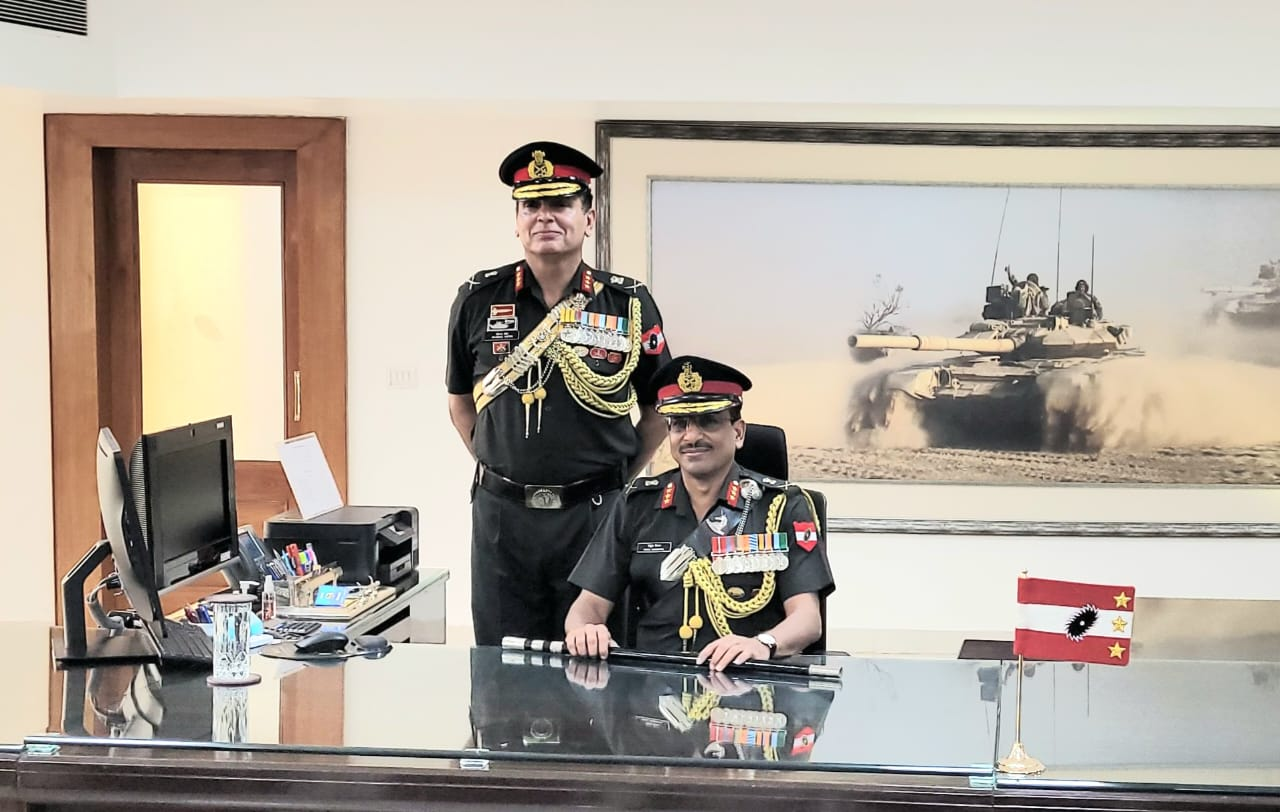
Lt Gen Vipul Shinghal taking over the command of the Corps from Lt Gen Dhiraj Seth, August 2022.

Rank	Name	Appointment Date	Left office	Unit of Commission	References
Lieutenant General	G L Bakshi	April 1990	January 1992	Kumaon Regiment	
Lieutenant General	R K Gulati	January 1992	October 1992	9th Deccan Horse	
Lieutenant General	Krishna Mohan Seth	October 1992	October 1994	Regiment of Artillery	
Lieutenant General	Chandra Shekhar	October 1994	1996	4th Gorkha Rifles	
Lieutenant General	Nirmal Chander Vij	1996	1997	Dogra Regiment	
Lieutenant General	B M Kapur	1997		Armoured Corps	
Lieutenant General	Satish Satpute		30 August 2002	Maratha Light Infantry	
Lieutenant General	P P S Bhandari	31 August 2002	31 December 2004	4th Horse (Hodson's Horse)	
Lieutenant General	Aditya Singh	1 January 2004	January 2005	9th Deccan Horse	
Lieutenant General	Harcharanjit Singh Panag	January 2005	December 2006	Sikh Regiment	
Lieutenant General	Pradeep Khanna	January 2007	May 2008	20 Lancers	
Lieutenant General	Arvinder Singh Lamba	26 May 2008	May 2009	Regiment of Artillery	
Lieutenant General	Rajinder Singh	May 2009	2010	Mechanised Infantry Regiment	
Lieutenant General	Syed Ata Hasnain	2010	December 2010	Garhwal Rifles	
Lieutenant General	Sanjiv Langer	December 2010	January 2012	Armoured Corps	
Lieutenant General	S H Kulkarni	January 2012	January 2013	Armoured Corps	
Lieutenant General	Amit Sharma	January 2013	February 2014	45 Cavalry	
Lieutenant General	Rajeev Vasant Kanitkar	February 2014	2015	17th Horse (Poona Horse)	
Lieutenant General	Pradeep Singh Mehta	2015	31 June 2016	1st Horse (Skinner's Horse)	
Lieutenant General	Cherish Mathson	1 July 2016	30 June 2017	Garhwal Rifles	
Lieutenant General	Iqroop Singh Ghuman	1 July 2017	31 June 2018	Brigade of the Guards	
Lieutenant General	Ravendra Pal Singh	1 July 2018	July 2019	Mechanised Infantry Regiment	
Lieutenant General	Yogendra Dimri	July 2019	25 July 2020	Bombay Sappers	
Lieutenant General	Atulya Solankey	26 July 2020	30 July 2021	11th Gorkha Rifles	
Lieutenant General	Dhiraj Seth	31 July 2021	31 July 2022	2nd Lancers (Gardner's Horse)	
Lieutenant General	Vipul Shinghal	3 August 2022	31 December 2023	51 Armoured Regiment	
Lieutenant General	Prit Pal Singh	1 January 2024	31 July 2025	62 Cavalry	
Lieutenant General	Arvind Chauhan	1 August 2025	Incumbent	1 Gorkha Rifles	

== See also ==
- Indian Peace Keeping Force
- 72nd Indian Infantry Brigade
