= Rajesh Pushkar =

Lieutenant General in the Indian Army

Lieutenant General Rajesh Pushkar AVSM VSM
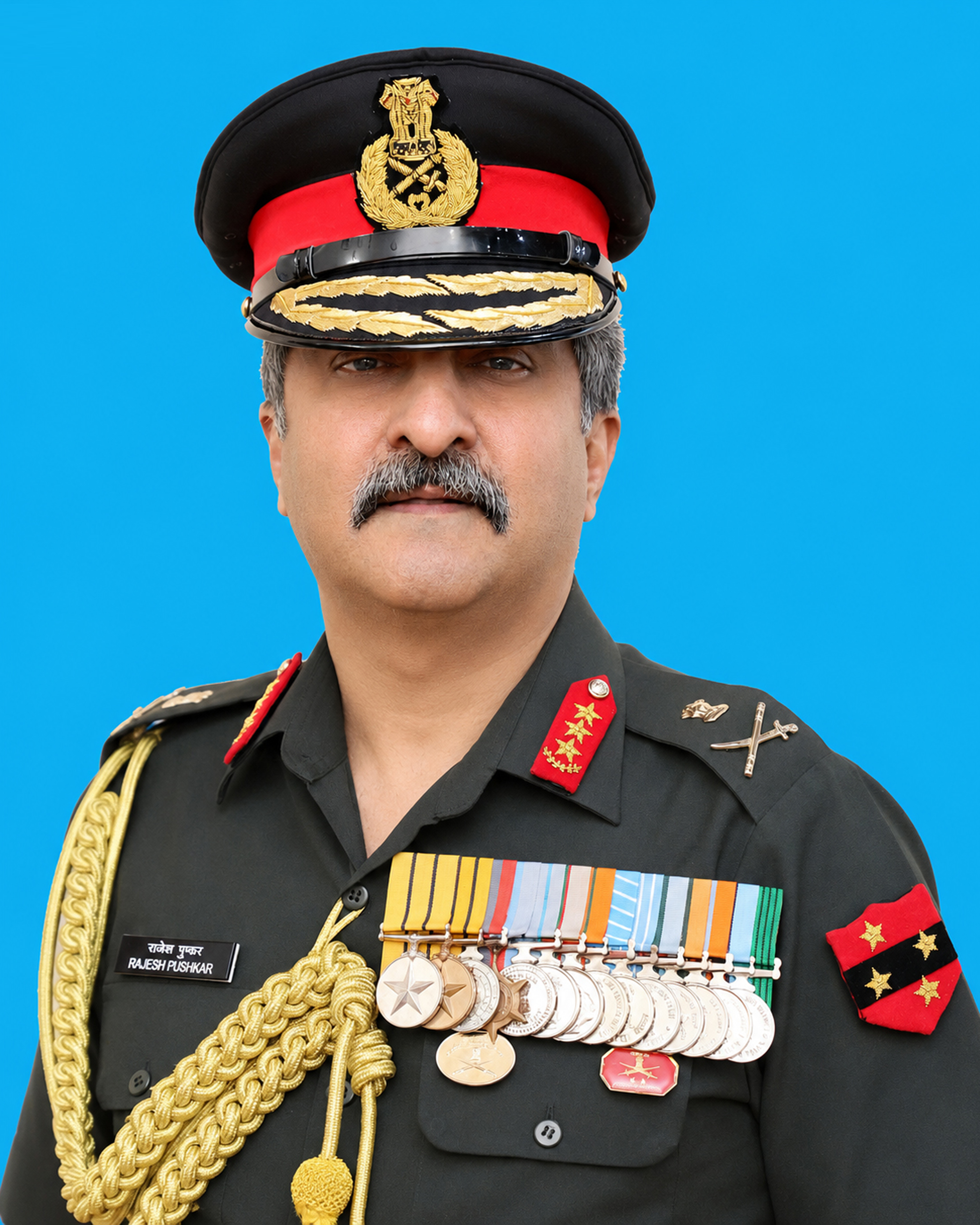
- Official portrait, 2026

General Officer Commanding-in-Chief Southern Command
- Incumbent
- Assumed office 1 July 2026
- Chief of Army Staff: Dhiraj Seth
- Preceded by: Sandeep Jain

Personal details
- Relations: Sunanda Pushkar (Sister); Shashi Tharoor (Brother-in-Law)

Military service
- Allegiance: India
- Branch/service: Indian Army
- Years of service: 17 December 1988 – Present
- Rank: Lieutenant General
- Unit: 74 Armoured Regiment
- Commands: Southern Command; II Corps; Indian Military Training Team; 15th Infantry Division; 14 (I) Armoured Brigade
- Service number: IC-48046A
- Awards: Ati Vishisht Seva Medal; Vishisht Seva Medal

Lieutenant General Rajesh Pushkar, AVSM, VSM is a serving general officer of the Indian Army. He is currently serving as the General Officer Commanding-in-Chief, Southern Command. He earlier served as the General Officer Commanding II Corps and as the Director General of Territorial Army. He is also the Colonel of the Regiment of the Armoured Corps.

== Early life and education ==
Pushkar is one of three children born to Lieutenant Colonel Pushkar Nath Dass and Jaya Dass. His elder sister Sunanda Pushkar was a businesswoman and was married to Shashi Tharoor.

Pushkar is an alumnus of the National Defence Academy, Khadakwasla and the Indian Military Academy, Dehradun. He is also an alumnus of Defence Services Staff College, Wellington, College of Defence Management, Secunderabad, and the National Defence College, New Delhi. He holds a Masters in Defence and Strategic Studies, a Masters in Management Studies and a Master of Philosophy in Defence and International Relations.

== Military career ==
Pushkar was commissioned into the 74th Armoured Regiment on 17 December 1988 from the Indian Military Academy. In a career spanning over three decades he has held various command and staff appointments. He attended the Defence Services Staff College, Wellington. He also served as an instructor at his alma mater, the National Defence Academy.

As a Colonel, Pushkar commanded an armoured regiment in an operational area, served as Colonel Military Secretary (Col MS) in a Strike Corps and as Colonel General Staff (Col GS) of an Armoured Division in the Western Sector. As a Brigadier, he commanded the 14th Independent Armoured Brigade, served as Brigadier Quartermaster General (Brig Q) of a Strike Corps and Brigadier General Staff (BGS) of an Operational Command. He undertook an diplomatic assignment as Defence Attaché at the Embassy of India, Moscow, with accreditation to Armenia and Belarus.

=== General officer ===
As a Major General, Pushkar commanded the 15th Infantry Division in the western sector. He also served as the Commandant of Indian Military Training Team, Bhutan in Bhutan and as the Additional Director General, Armoured Corps at Army headquarters, New Delhi. On promotion to the rank of Lieutenant General, he assumed the appointment of Director General of Territorial Army.

After a short stint as DGTA, on 1 July 2024, Pushkar took over as the General Officer Commanding, II Corps succeeding Lieutenant General Rahul R Singh. He was in command of II Corps during Operation Sindoor. On 1 July 2026, Lieutenant General Pushkar took over as the General Officer Commanding-in-Chief, Southern Command succeeding Lieutenant General Sandeep Jain upon his elevation as the Vice Chief of Army Staff.

== Awards and decorations ==
Pushkar was awarded the Ati Vishisht Seva Medal in 2025 and the Vishisht Seva Medal in 2016. He has also received the Chief of Army Staff Commendation and three Army Commander Commendations.

Ati Vishisht Seva Medal		Vishisht Seva Medal	
Special Service Medal	Operation Vijay Star	Operation Vijay Medal	Operation Parakram Medal
Sainya Seva Medal	High Altitude Medal	Videsh Seva Medal	75th Independence Anniversary Medal
50th Independence Anniversary Medal	30 Years Long Service Medal	20 Years Long Service Medal	9 Years Long Service Medal

== Dates of rank ==
Insignia	Rank	Component	Date of rank
	Second Lieutenant	Indian Army	17 December 1988
	Lieutenant	Indian Army	17 December 1990
	Captain	Indian Army	17 December 1993
	Major	Indian Army	17 December 1999
	Lieutenant Colonel	Indian Army	16 December 2004
	Colonel	Indian Army	17 December 2008
	Brigadier	Indian Army	1 December 2014 (acting) 1 February 2016 (substantive with seniority from 24 September 2012)
	Major General	Indian Army	1 February 2022 (seniority from 20 November 2018)
	Lieutenant General	Indian Army	2024

Military offices
Preceded by Sandeep Jain	General Officer Commanding-in-Chief Southern Command; 1 July 2026 - Present	Incumbent
Preceded by Rahul R Singh	General Officer Commanding II Corps; 1 July 2024 - 30 June 2026	Succeeded by Manish Luthra
