= Sandeep Jain =

50th Vice Chief of Army Staff, Indian Army

Lieutenant General Sandeep Jain AVSM SM
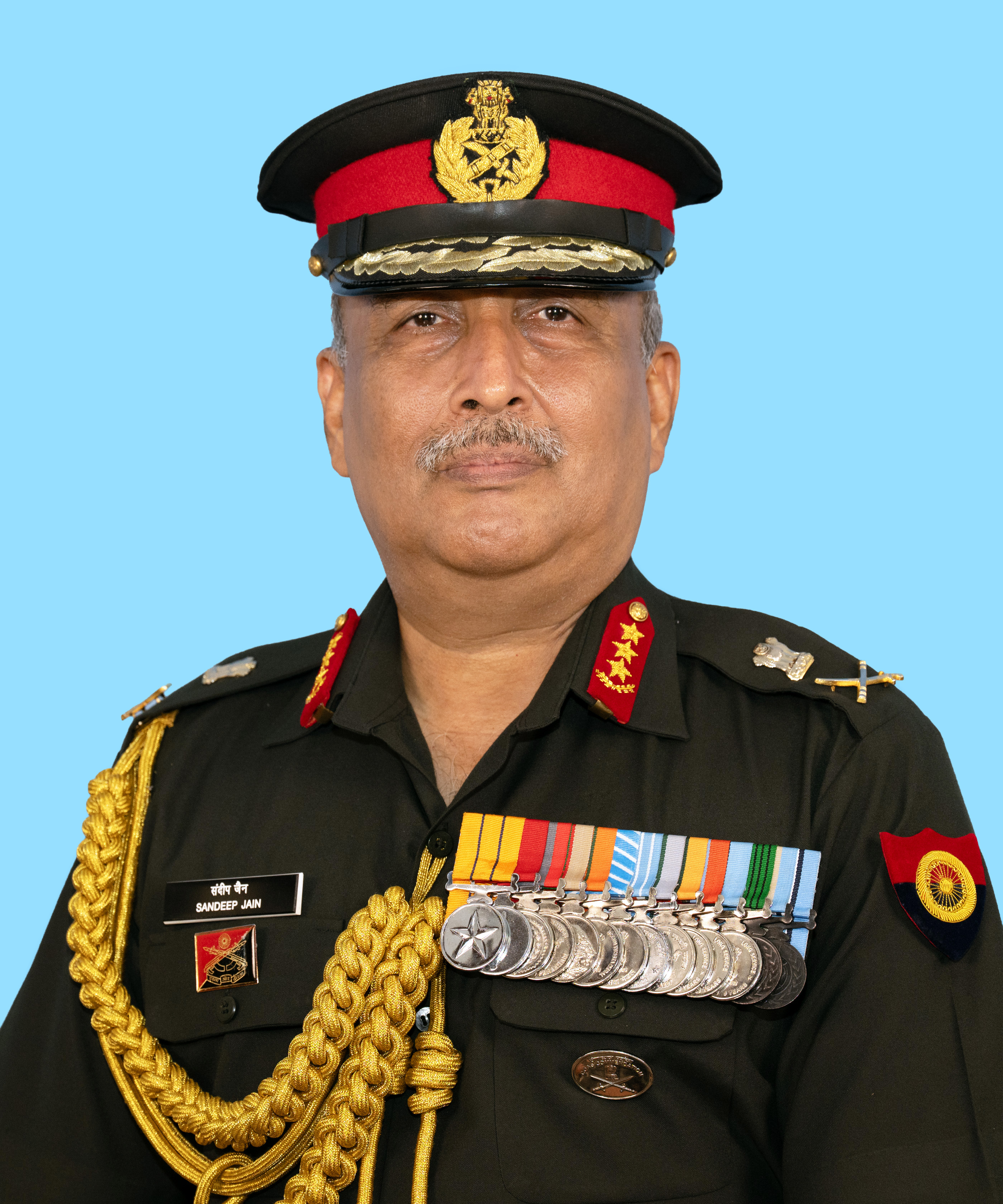
- Official Portrait, 2026

50th Vice Chief of the Army Staff
- Incumbent
- Assumed office 1 July 2026
- President: Droupadi Murmu
- Chief of Army Staff: Dhiraj Seth
- Preceded by: Dhiraj Seth

General Officer Commanding-in-Chief Southern Command
- In office 1 April 2026 – 30 June 2026
- Chief of Army Staff: Upendra Dwivedi
- Preceded by: Dhiraj Seth
- Succeeded by: Rajesh Pushkar

Military service
- Allegiance: India
- Branch/service: Indian Army
- Years of service: 11 June 1988 – Present
- Rank: Lieutenant General
- Unit: 13 Mahar Regiment
- Commands: Southern Command; Indian Military Academy; XVI Corps
- Service number: IC-47661L
- Awards: Ati Vishisht Seva Medal; Sena Medal

Lieutenant General Sandeep Jain, AVSM, SM is a serving general officer of the Indian Army. He currently serves as the 50th Vice Chief of the Army Staff. He was previously serving as the General Officer Commanding-in-Chief, Southern Command, prior to that he was Chief of Staff, Southern Command. He earlier served as the Commandant, Indian Military Academy and as General Officer Commanding XVI Corps. He is also the Colonel of the Regiment of the Mahar Regiment since 1 August 2024.

== Early life and education ==
He is an alumnus of the National Defence Academy, Khadakwasla and the Indian Military Academy, Dehradun. He is also an alumnus of the Defence Services Staff College, Wellington and the National Defence College, Kenya.

== Military Career ==
The general officer was commissioned into 13th Battalion of the Mahar Regiment on 11 June 1988 from the Indian Military Academy. In a career spanning over three decades, he has undertaken numerous command and staff appointments. He was a Sector Commander at United Nations Mission in Sudan, an Infantry Brigade in Strike Corps and was General Officer Commanding of a Counter Insurgency Force in Jammu & Kashmir. He has also served with the Military Operations Directorate, Military Secretary’s Branch and as a Military observer in Ethiopia.

After being promoted to the rank of Lieutenant General, he assumed the appointment of Director General (Capability Development) at the Army Headquarters, New Delhi. On 24 December 2022, he took over as the General Officer Commanding XVI Corps. A year later on 1 February 2024, he took over as the Commandant of the Indian Military Academy. He subsequently assumed the appointment of Chief of Staff, Southern Command in June 2025.

On 1 April 2026, Lieutenant General Sandeep Jain took over as the General Officer Commanding-in-Chief, Southern Command and relinquished the command of Southern Command on 30 June 2026.

On 1 July 2026, he took over as the 50th Vice Chief of the Army Staff succeeding General Dhiraj Seth upon his elevation as the Chief of the Army Staff.

== Awards and decorations ==
During his career, the general officer has been awarded the Ati Vishisht Seva Medal in 2025 and the Sena Medal in 2022.

	Ati Vishisht Seva Medal	Sena Medal	
Special Service Medal	Operation Parakram Medal	Sainya Seva Medal	High Altitude Medal
Videsh Seva Medal	75th Independence Anniversary Medal	50th Independence Anniversary Medal	30 Years Long Service Medal
20 Years Long Service Medal	9 Years Long Service Medal	UNMEE	UNMIS

== Dates of rank ==
Insignia	Rank	Component	Date of rank
	Second Lieutenant	Indian Army	11 June 1988
	Lieutenant	Indian Army	11 June 1990
	Captain	Indian Army	11 June 1993
	Major	Indian Army	11 June 1999
	Lieutenant Colonel	Indian Army	16 December 2004
	Colonel	Indian Army	11 June 2008
	Brigadier	Indian Army	13 June 2014 (acting) 29 October 2015 (substantive, with seniority from 14 September 2012)
	Major General	Indian Army	6 February 2020 (seniority from 20 November 2018)
	Lieutenant General	Indian Army	6 May 2022

Military offices
Preceded by Dhiraj Seth	Vice Chief of Army Staff; 1 July 2026 - Present	Incumbent
Preceded by Dhiraj Seth	General Officer Commanding-in-Chief Southern Command; 1 April 2026 - 30 June 2026	Succeeded by Rajesh Pushkar
Preceded by Shrinjay Pratap Singh	Chief of Staff, Southern Command; 1 June 2025 – 31 March 2026	Succeeded by Ajay Kumar
Preceded by Vijay Kumar Mishra	Commandant; Indian Military Academy; 1 February 2024 – 31 May 2025	Succeeded by Nagendra Singh
Preceded by Manjinder Singh	General Officer Commanding XVI Corps; 24 December 2022 – 31 December 2023	Succeeded by Navin Sachdeva
