= II Corps (India) =

Military field formation of the Indian Army

- Indian Army II Corps Formation Sign
- Active: 1971 - Present
- Country: India
- Allegiance: Indian Army
- Role: Strike Corps
- Size: Corps
- Part of: Western Command
- Garrison/HQ: Ambala
- Nickname: Kharga Corps

Commanders
- Current commander: Lt Gen Manish Luthra
- Notable commanders: Gen Tapishwar Narain Raina; Lt Gen Zorawar Chand Bakhshi; Lt Gen Srinivas Kumar Sinha; Lt Gen B.C. Nanda; Lt Gen Hanut Singh; Gen V. K. Singh; Gen Manoj Mukund Naravane; Gen N. S. Raja Subramani

II Corps is a corps of the Indian Army, based in Ambala and known as Kharga Corps.

The Corps was raised on October 6, 1971 by Lt Gen T N Raina at Krishna Nagar in West Bengal and saw action two months later in December. During the Indo-Pakistani War of 1971, it captured the important towns of Khulna, Jessore, Jhenida, Magura and Faridpur and also the area between the rivers Ganges and Padma. Subsequently, the Corps was shifted to the Western Theatre where it was initially located at Chandimandir Cantonment till 1984, and then moved to Ambala in January 1985.

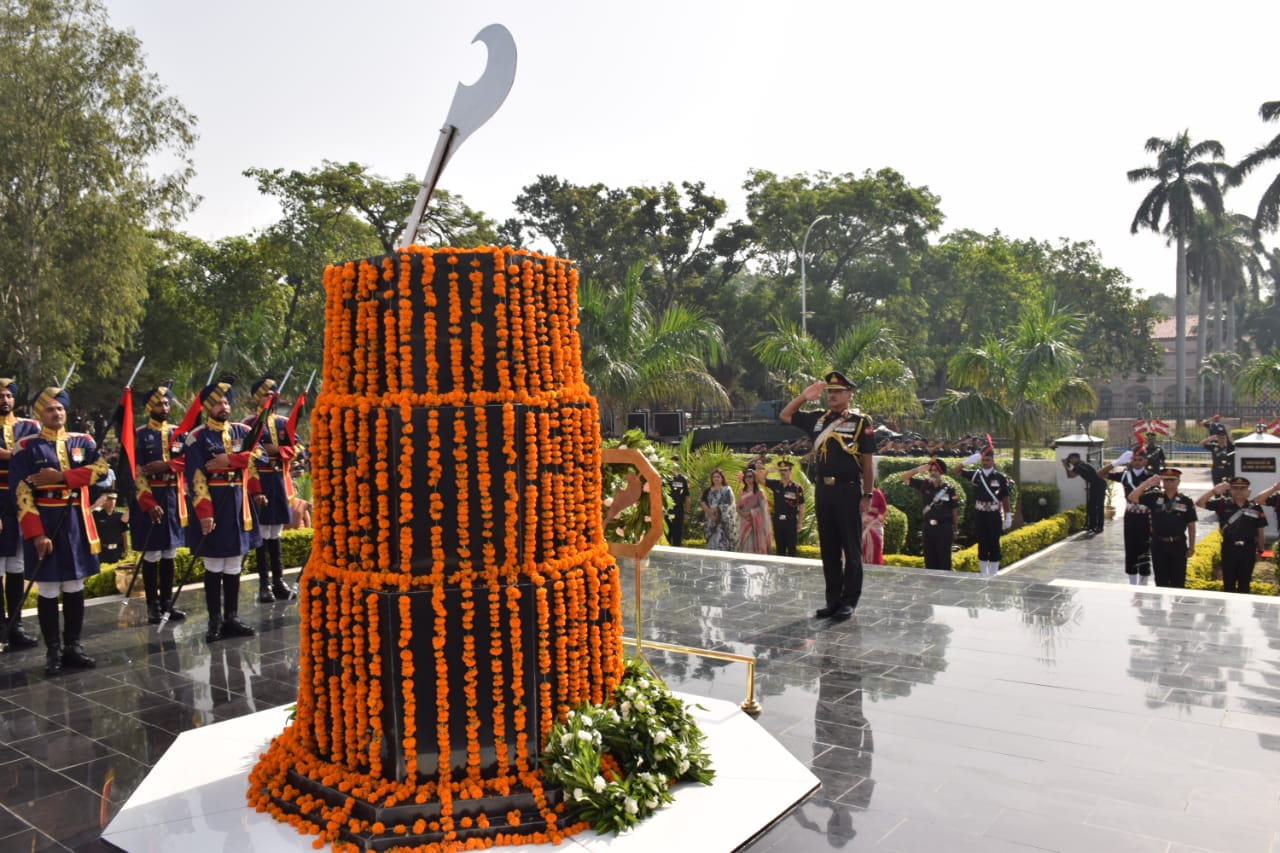
48th Raising Day of Kharga Corps (2 Corps), October 2018

== Indo-Pakistani War of 1971 ==
The II Corps consisted of 4th Mountain Division and 9th Infantry Division (the only infantry division in the east, it had more motor vehicles and heavier artillery than its mountain counterparts); the corps was later reinforced by 50 Parachute Brigade (minus one battalion). Under Lieutenant General Tapishwar Narain Raina ('Tappy'), the 20 infantry battalions of II Corps were to take Khulna, Jessore, Goalundo Ghat, Faridpur, and the Hardinge Bridge. Convinced that Khulna was one of the keys to East Pakistan, General Manekshaw placed especial stress on its capture. Dacca was not mentioned except in some contingency plans for crossing the Padma (Ganges) at Faridpur and Goalundo Ghat. Paying little attention to possible operations against the chief city of East Pakistan, therefore, Raina planned to advance on two axes with 4th Division in the north towards Jhenida and 9th Division aiming for Jessore on the southern approach.

Operations by Indian troops and Mukti Bahini during late November had secured a sizable enclave between Bayra and Jessore. An Indian success at Garibpur on 21/22 November was particularly significant, as it allowed the Indian 9th Division to gain considerable ground towards Jessore and resulted in the virtual destruction of the lone Pakistani armored squadron in the area. The action at Garibpur, however, also alerted the Pakistanis to the 9th Division’s proposed line of advance. As a result, the division quickly became embroiled in a tough and costly slogging match on 4 and 5 December once the full-scale conflict broke out. This fight took its toll on the Pakistanis too, however, and the exhausted 107 Brigade abandoned Jessore on the night of 6/7 December, withdrawing south to Khulna in considerable confusion.47

The Pakistani division headquarters and other remnants fled east toward the Madhumati River. A Pakistani officer recalled that “The front here had crumbled completely...Withdrawal quickly turned into a rout.” Riding into Jessore in the dawn hours of 7 December, he noted, “It looked like a ghost town, except for sleepy dogs and chickens, not a soul stirred. Doors were wide open; all kinds of personal belongings littered the roads. It looked like the end of East Pakistan.”48 The Indians occupied Jessore later that day, but Major General Dalbir Singh, the 9th Division commander, allowed himself to be distracted by Khulna and turned his entire division toward an objective that was supposed to be taken by a brigade. The town held out stoutly for the remainder of the war in the face of repeated attacks.

The 9 Division’s reserve force, 50 Para Brigade, engaged in a brief skirmish at Khajura north of Jessore on 8 December before being pulled out the next day for transfer to the western front. A planned two-company airborne attack by 8 Para near Jhenida was called off as unnecessary. The “Red Eagles,” Indian 4 Division, launched a well-conducted attack north and east from its positions around Jibannagar, skillfully bypassing or overwhelming resistance to enter Jhenida on 7 December. Like 9 Division, however, the leadership of the 4th was distracted by a flank objective. In this case, when a hasty attempt to capture Kushtia and the Hardinge Bridge miscarried, the senior commanders overreacted and diverted the entire division to the north. Although the Indian advance helped urge Pakistan’s 57 Brigade in its retreat across the Ganges, by the time 4 Division had returned to the Magura area (14 December), it was too late to participate in the drive for Dacca. The division made a fine crossing of the Madhumati (albeit against light resistance) and took the surrender of the broken remnants of Pakistani 9 Division at Faridpur on 16 December. Indian Army and BSF troops from Bengal Area under Major General P. Chowdry made limited gains on the Satkhira axis.

== Shift to West ==
The corps moved to its present location in January 1985. The pullback of over four lakh troops along with heavy armored and artillery formations from forward positions along the International Border (IB) with Pakistan was an enormous logistical exercise, with costs running into hundreds of crores of rupees. Demobilisation began from Punjab, followed by Rajasthan, Gujarat and the Jammu sector. While it took 28 days for the initial mobilisation, the pullback is expected to take slightly longer. The troops had been hanging on the border in combat readiness for 10 months, and the harsh weather and terrain took a heavy toll on both the men and their equipment.

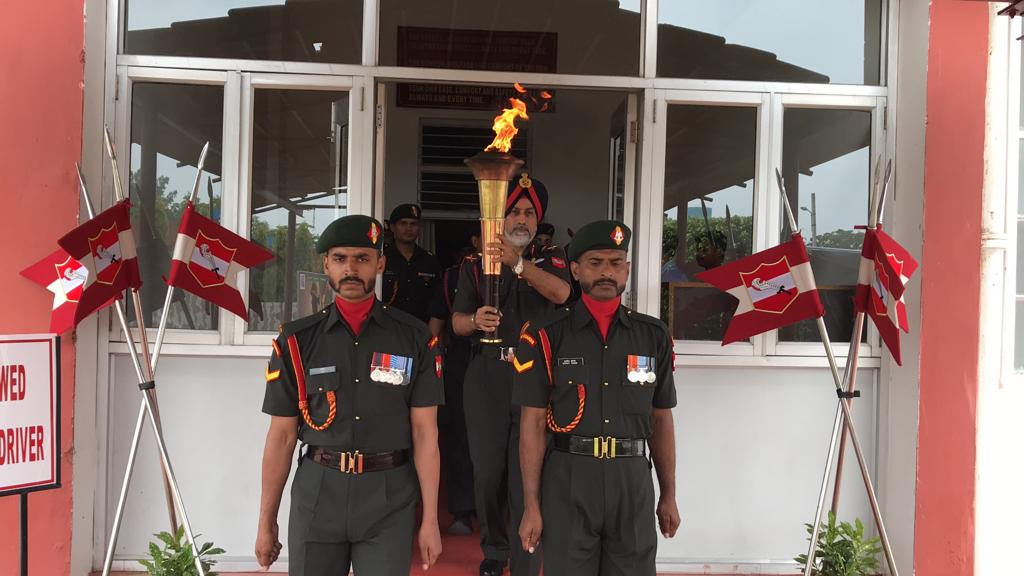
Celebration of 20 years of Kargil Victory at Kharga Corps (2 Corps), July 2019

As of around 2016, it consists of -

- Divisions
  - 1 Armoured Division (Airawat Division) headquartered at Patiala. 1 Division had 1 Armoured and 43 Lorry Brigade, a scheme it retained till after the 1971 War, when armoured divisions were changed to a three-brigade layout, and 43 Lorry Brigade became 43 Armoured Brigade.
  - 14 Infantry Division (RAPID) (Golden Key Division)] at Dehra Dun, Uttarakhand. Division Artillery Brigade is at Dehra Dun, 35 Infantry Brigade at Dehra Dun, 58 Armoured Brigade at Roorkee, and 116 Infantry Brigade at Dehra Dun.
  - 22 Infantry Division (Charging Ram Division) headquartered at Meerut
  - 40 Artillery Division (Deep Strikers Division) at Ambala
- Corps Brigades
  - 2 Corps Artillery Brigade
  - 474 Engineering Brigade (Kharga Engineers) headquartered at Zirakpur
- Independent Brigades
  - 612 Mechanised Independent Air Defence Brigade at Ambala
  - 16 Independent Armoured Brigade (Black Arrow Brigade) at Mamun

== List of General Officers Commanding (GOCs) ==
Rank	Name	Appointment Date	Left office	Unit of Commission	References
Lieutenant General	Tapishwar Narain Raina	6 October 1971	17 October 1973	Kumaon Regiment	
Lieutenant General	A. M. Vohra	18 October 1973	27 May 1975	3rd Gorkha Rifles	
Lieutenant General	Zorawar Chand Bakhshi	28 May 1975	31 January 1979	5th Gorkha Rifles (Frontier Force)	
Lieutenant General	Manohar Lal Chibber	1 February 1979	21 July 1980	Jammu and Kashmir Light Infantry	
Lieutenant General	Srinivas Kumar Sinha	22 July 1980	28 May 1981	Jat Regiment	
Lieutenant General	Hriday Kaul	29 May 1981	19 January 1983	2nd Lancers	
Lieutenant General	Nirmal Puri	20 January 1983	16 December 1984	Armoured Corps	
Lieutenant General	Biddanda Chengappa Nanda	17 December 1984	28 April 1986	Mahar Regiment	
Lieutenant General	Hanut Singh	29 April 1986	11 July 1988	17th Horse (Poona Horse)	
Lieutenant General	G. S. Grewal	12 July 1988	30 June 1990	1st Horse (Skinner's Horse)	
Lieutenant General	Prakash Mani Tripathi	1 July 1990	15 September 1992	63 Cavalry	
Lieutenant General	K. L. D'Souza	16 September 1992	30 April 1994	Mechanised Infantry Regiment	
Lieutenant General	S. K. Sharma	1 May 1994	30 March 1995	Armoured Corps	
Lieutenant General	S. K. Jetley	31 March 1995	11 October 1996	Central India Horse	
Lieutenant General	S. S. Mehta	12 October 1996	19 March 1998	63 Cavalry	
Lieutenant General	Gurbaksh Singh Sihota	20 March 1998	30 September 2000	Regiment of Artillery	
Lieutenant General	Kapil Vij	1 October 2000	29 January 2002	70 Armoured Regiment	
Lieutenant General	Bhupender Singh Thakur	30 January 2002	September 2003	Central India Horse	
Lieutenant General	G.D. Singh	October 2004	March 2006	Armoured Corps	
Lieutenant General	Vijay Kumar Singh	April 2006	February 2008	Rajput Regiment	
Lieutenant General	J. P. Singh	1 March 2008	20 March 2009	Armoured Corps	
Lieutenant General	Chetinder Singh	21 March 2009	25 December 2010	7th Light Cavalry	
Lieutenant General	Anil Chandra Chait	26 February 2010	29 May 2011	Armoured Corps	
Lieutenant General	Amarjeet Singh Chabbewal	30 May 2011	4 August 2012	67 Armoured Regiment	
Lieutenant General	Sandeep Singh	5 August 2012	11 August 2013	Jammu and Kashmir Rifles	
Lieutenant General	Ravindra Pratap Sahi	12 August 2013	9 December 2014	Brigade of The Guards	
Lieutenant General	Amarjeet Singh	10 December 2014	18 December 2015	Bihar Regiment	
Lieutenant General	Manoj Mukund Naravane	19 December 2015	4 January 2017	Sikh Light Infantry	
Lieutenant General	Jaiveer Singh Negi	5 January 2017	12 January 2018	Dogra Regiment	
Lieutenant General	Alok Singh Kler	13 January 2018	27 January 2019	68 Armoured Regiment	
Lieutenant General	Manmohan Jeet Singh Kahlon	28 January 2019	2 February 2020	75 Armoured Regiment	
Lieutenant General	Surinder Singh Mahal	3 February 2020	11 February 2021	41 Armoured Regiment	
Lieutenant General	N. S. Raja Subramani	12 February 2021	21 March 2022	Garhwal Rifles	
Lieutenant General	Pratik Sharma	21 March 2022	31 May 2023	Madras Regiment	
Lieutenant General	Rahul R Singh	1 June 2023	30 June 2024	Regiment of Artillery	
Lieutenant General	Rajesh Pushkar	1 July 2024	30 June 2026	74 Armoured Regiment	
Lieutenant General	Manish Luthra	30 June 2026	Incumbent	Jammu and Kashmir Rifles	
