= Atulya Solankey =

Lieutenant General Atulya Solankey Ati Vishisht Seva Medal Sena Medal
- Born: Shimla
- Education: National Defence College; Naval War College; Defence Services Staff College; Indian Military Academy
- Military career
- Allegiance: India
- Branch: Indian Army
- Service years: 1984-2022
- Rank: Lieutenant General
- Unit: 5/11 Gorkha Rifles
- Commands: XXI Corps; 9th Infantry Division; 5/11 Gorkha Rifles
- Awards: Ati Vishisht Seva Medal; Sena Medal

Lieutenant General Atulya Solankey, AVSM, SM is a former general officer in the Indian Army who last served as the Deputy Chief of Integrated Defence Staff Policy Planning & Force Development (PP & FD). He previously commanded the XXI Corps at Bhopal, the 9th Infantry Division (India) , an independent mountain brigade & commanded the 5th Battalion of the 11th Gorkha Rifles. He also served as Secretary at National Defence College (India)

== Early Life & Education ==
The general officer was born at Shimla & attended Shaheed Bhagat Singh College during his early years . He is an alumnus of Indian Military Academy. He is also a graduate of the Defence Services Staff College, Wellington and the National Defence College.

== Military career ==
The general officer was commissioned into the 2nd battalion of the 11th Gorkha Rifles on 15 December 1984 from the Indian Military Academy. He has commanded 5th Battalion of the 11 Gorkha Rifles. He later commanded an independent mountain brigade, subsequently commanded the 9th Infantry Division (India) & commanded the XXI Corps at Bhopal. He last served as the Deputy Chief of Integrated Defence Staff Policy Planning & Force Development (PP & FD).

He also served as part of the United Nations Mission in Sierra Leone contributing to peacekeeping operations during his tenure.

== Awards and decorations ==
During his career, he has been awarded the Ati Vishisht Seva Medal in 2021 and the Sena Medal in 2013 for distinguished service.

Ati Vishisht Seva Medal	Sena Medal	Special Service Medal	Operation Parakram Medal
Sainya Seva Medal	Videsh Seva Medal	75th Anniversary of Independence Medal	50th Anniversary of Independence Medal
30 Years Long Service Medal	20 Years Long Service Medal	9 Years Long Service Medal	UNAMSIL

Military offices
Preceded by Yogendra Dimri	General Officer Commanding XXI Corps; 26 July 2020 – 30 July 2021	Succeeded by Dhiraj Seth
