= Devendra Sharma =

Devendra Sharma may refer to:

- Devendra Sharma (umpire) (born 1953), Indian cricket umpire
- Devendra Sharma (politician) (1959–2025), Indian politician
- Devendra Sharma (serial killer), Indian serial killer and Ayurveda doctor
