= Dhiraj Seth =

31st Chief of Army Staff, Indian Army

General Dhiraj Seth PVSM UYSM AVSM
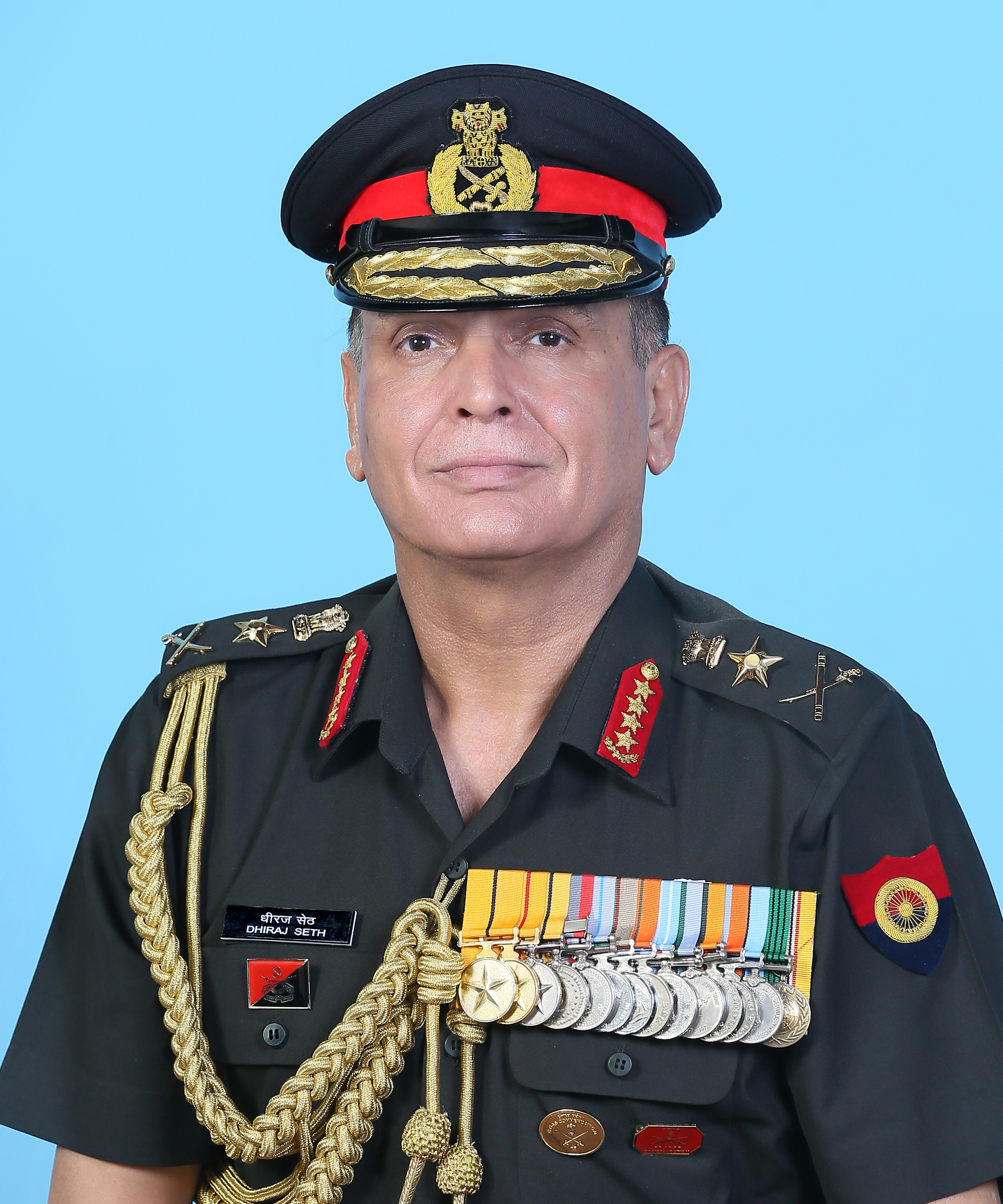
- Official Portrait, 2026

31st Chief of the Army Staff
- Incumbent
- Assumed office 30 June 2026
- President: Droupadi Murmu
- Minister of Defence: Rajnath Singh
- Preceded by: Upendra Dwivedi

49th Vice Chief of the Army Staff
- In office 1 April 2026 – 30 June 2026
- President: Droupadi Murmu
- Chief of Army Staff: Upendra Dwivedi
- Preceded by: Pushpendra Pal Singh
- Succeeded by: Sandeep Jain

General Officer Commanding-in-Chief Southern Command
- In office 1 July 2024 – 31 March 2026
- Chief of Army Staff: Upendra Dwivedi
- Preceded by: Ajai Kumar Singh
- Succeeded by: Sandeep Jain

General Officer Commanding-in-Chief South Western Command
- In office 1 November 2023 – 30 June 2024
- Preceded by: B. S. Raju
- Succeeded by: Manjinder Singh

Personal details
- Spouse: Komal Seth

Military service
- Allegiance: India
- Branch/service: Indian Army
- Years of service: 20 December 1986 – Present
- Rank: General
- Unit: 2nd Lancers
- Commands: Southern Command; South Western Command; Delhi Area; XXI Corps; Uniform Force; 98 Armoured Brigade; 1st Horse (Skinner's Horse)
- Service number: IC-44044X
- Awards: Param Vishisht Seva Medal; Uttam Yudh Seva Medal; Ati Vishisht Seva Medal

General Dhiraj Seth, PVSM, UYSM, AVSM is a serving four-star general officer of the Indian Army. He is the current and 31st Chief of the Army Staff. He previously served as the 49th Vice Chief of the Army Staff. He earlier served as the General Officer Commanding-in-Chief, Southern Command, as General Officer Commanding-in-Chief, South Western Command, as General Officer Commanding, Delhi Area and as the General Officer Commanding, XXI Corps. He is also the Colonel of the Regiment of the Armoured Corps.

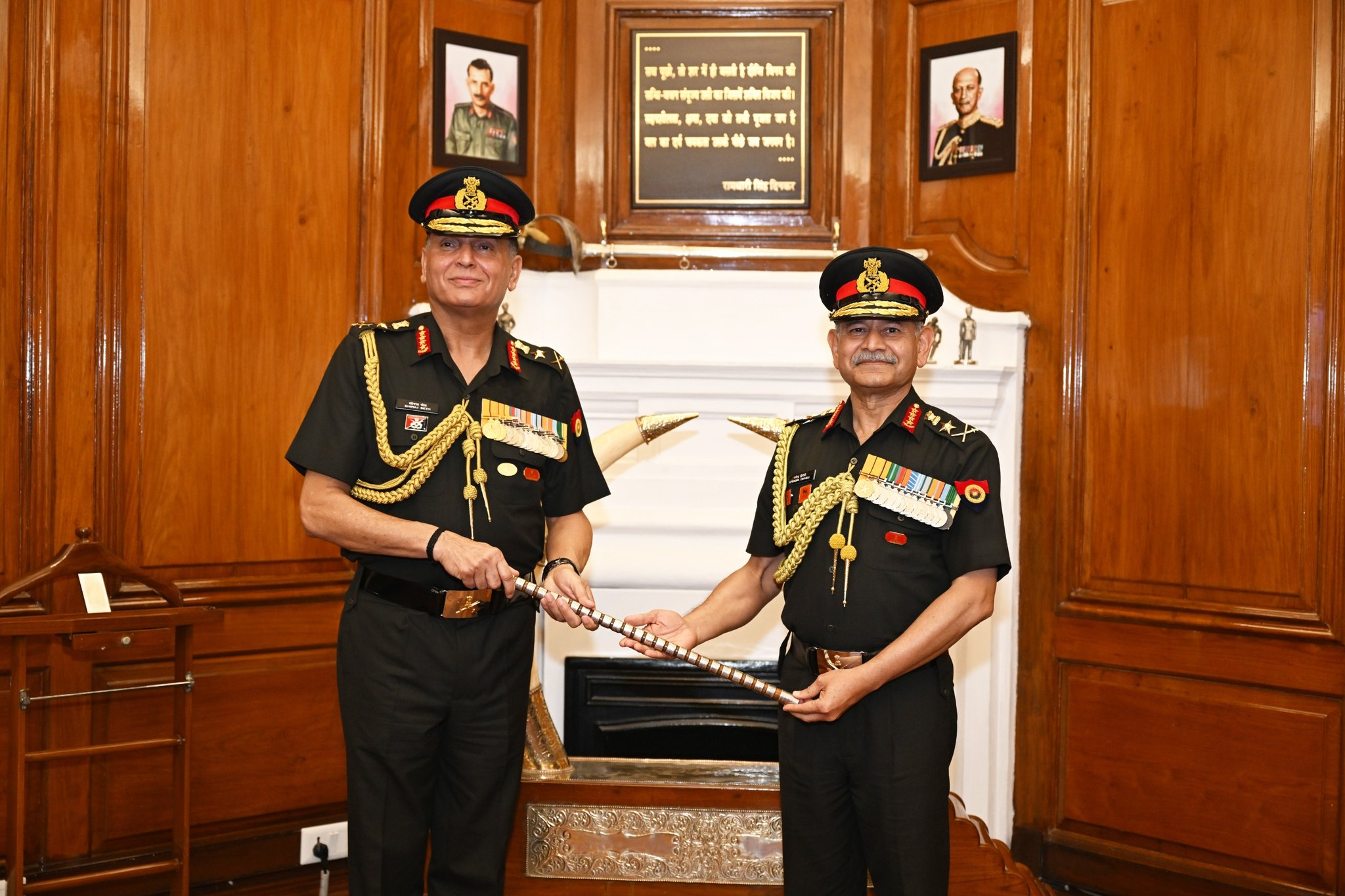
Gen Upendra Dwivedi hands over the baton to Gen Dhiraj Seth

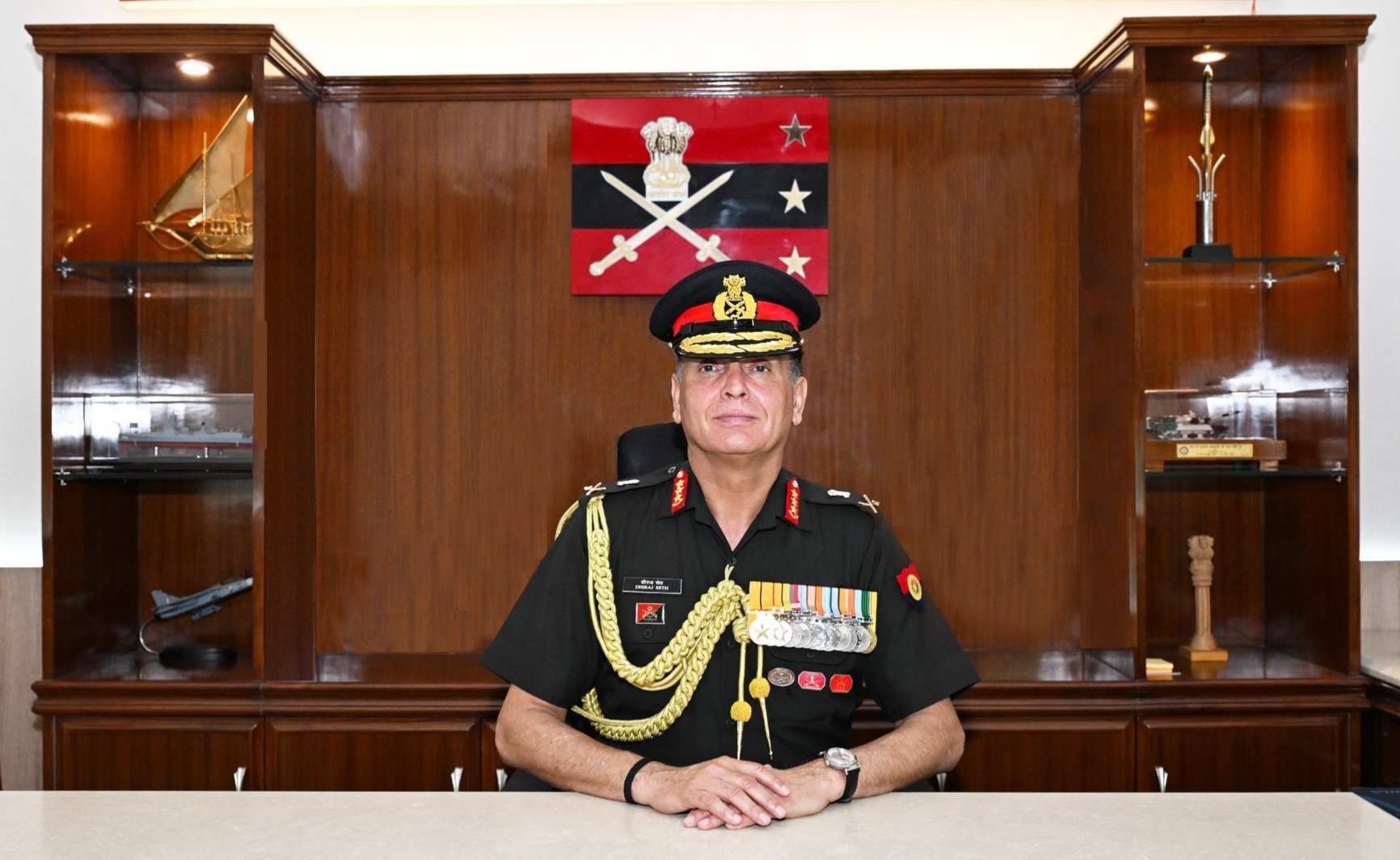
Gen Seth as VCOAS

== Early life and education ==
He is an alumnus of 69th course of the National Defence Academy, Khadakwasla where he was part of Foxtrot squadron along with Chief of Air Staff Air Chief Marshal Ashutosh Dixit and subsequently joined the Indian Military Academy, Dehradun. He is also an alumnus of the Defence Services Staff College, Wellington, the Army War College, Mhow and the National Defence College, New Delhi. Later, he attended the General Staff Course at the French Collège interarmées de Défense and International Defense Acquisition Management Course at the Naval Postgraduate School, USA.

In DSSC, he was adjudged as the best all-round student of his course in 2006. He was also awarded the ‘Silver Centurion’ in the Young Officers Course and stood first in order of merit in several courses attended by him, including the Junior Command Course.

== Military career ==
The general was commissioned into the 2nd Lancers (Gardner's Horse) on 20 December 1986 from the Indian Military Academy. In a career spanning over three decades, he has undertaken numerous command, staff and instructional appointments. He has commanded the Skinner's Horse, 98 Armoured Brigade and was General Officer Commanding of Uniform force in Jammu & Kashmir. He has served as brigade major of an independent Armoured brigade, as the Assistant Military Secretary in the Military Secretary's Branch, as Brigadier General Staff (Operations) at the South Western Command, as brigadier perspective plans with the Strategic Planning Directorate and as the Additional Director General Weapons and Equipment. He also served with the United Nations Angola Verification Mission III as an operations officer from 1995-1996. He has done instructional tenures as an instructor and assistant adjutant at the National Defence Academy (NDA), and as an instructor at the School of Armoured Warfare, Ahmednagar.

After being promoted to the rank of Lieutenant General, he assumed the appointment of Director General (Discipline, Ceremonial and Welfare) at Army Headquarters, New Delhi. On 31 July 2021, he took over as the General Officer Commanding, XXI Corps. He was subsequently appointed General Officer Commanding, Delhi Area in August 2022.

On 1 November 2023, Lieutenant General Dhiraj Seth took over as the General Officer Commanding-in-Chief, South Western Command succeeding Lieutenant General B. S. Raju who superannuated on 31 October 2023. On 1 July 2024, he took over as the General Officer Commanding-in-Chief, Southern Command succeeding Lieutenant General Ajai Kumar Singh. He relinquished the command on 31 March 2026.

On 1 April 2026, Lieutenant General Seth took over the appointment of Vice Chief of the Army Staff succeeding Lieutenant General Pushpendra Pal Singh who moved to Western Command as an Army Commander.

=== Chief of the Army Staff ===
On 13 June 2026, the Government of India appointed Lieutenant General Dhiraj Seth as the next Chief of Army Staff. On 30 June 2026, General Dhiraj Seth took over as the 31st Chief of the Army Staff succeeding General Upendra Dwivedi, who superannuated after more than four decades of service to the nation. General Seth is the 3rd Chief of Army Staff from the 2nd Lancers and the 7th COAS from the Armoured Corps. On assuming charge as the COAS, he outlined his vision of 'VIJAY' (Note: V stands for Vigilance, I for Innovation and Transformation, J for Jointness and Integration, A for Atmanirbharta and Y stands for Yodha First.) comprising five elements for the Indian Army.

During NDTV Defence summit 2026, he emphasised that land victory is the only tangible factor in war. He further added that there is no substitute for self reliance 'atmanirbharta' in weapon development.

== Personal life ==
He is married to Komal Seth and the couple has two daughters. The general is an avid sportsman and excels in Tennis and Golf. His father Lt Gen Krishna Mohan Seth retired as the Adjutant General of the Indian Army in 1997 and also commanded XXI Strike Corps and III Corps and his younger brother Rear Admiral Ravnish Seth is a serving flag officer in the Indian Navy.

== Awards and decorations ==
During his career, the general has been awarded the Param Vishisht Seva Medal in 2025, the Uttam Yudh Seva Medal in 2026 and the Ati Vishisht Seva Medal in 2022 and commendations from the Chief of Army Staff and Army Commanders.

Param Vishisht Seva Medal		Uttam Yudh seva Medal	
Ati Vishisht Seva Medal	Samanya Seva Medal	Special Service Medal	Sainya Seva Medal
High Altitude Medal	Videsh Seva Medal	75th Independence Anniversary Medal	50th Independence Anniversary Medal
30 Years Long Service Medal	20 Years Long Service Medal	9 Years Long Service Medal	UNAVEM III

== Dates of rank ==
Insignia	Rank	Component	Date of rank
	Second Lieutenant	Indian Army	20 December 1986
	Lieutenant	Indian Army	20 December 1988
	Captain	Indian Army	20 December 1991
	Major	Indian Army	20 December 1997
	Lieutenant Colonel	Indian Army	16 December 2004
	Colonel	Indian Army	1 May 2007
	Brigadier	Indian Army	24 May 2013 (acting); 9 September 2013 (substantive, with seniority from 24 June 2011)
	Major General	Indian Army	1 December 2018 (seniority from 1 February 2017)
	Lieutenant General	Indian Army	31 January 2021
	General (COAS)	Indian Army	30 June 2026

== Notes ==
Military offices
Preceded by Upendra Dwivedi	Chief of the Army Staff; 30 June 2026 - Present	Incumbent
Preceded by Pushpendra Pal Singh	Vice Chief of Army Staff; 1 April 2026 - 30 June 2026	Succeeded by Sandeep Jain
Preceded by Ajai Kumar Singh	General Officer Commanding-in-Chief Southern Command; 1 July 2024 - 31 March 2026	Succeeded by Sandeep Jain
Preceded by B. S. Raju	General Officer Commanding-in-Chief South Western Command; 1 November 2023 - 30 June 2024	Succeeded by Manjinder Singh
Preceded by Vijay Kumar Mishra	General Officer Commanding Delhi Area; 1 August 2022 – 31 October 2023	Succeeded by Bhavnish Kumar
Preceded by Atulya Solankey	General Officer Commanding XXI Corps; 31 July 2021 – 31 July 2022	Succeeded by Vipul Shinghal
