= Devendra Sharma (serial killer) =

Indian serial killer

- Born: Devendra Kumar Sharma; 1958 (age 67–68); Aligarh
- Citizenship: Indian
- Education: Bachelor of Ayurveda, Medicine and Surgery
- Status: Sentenced to life imprisonment on 13 March 2007; Sentenced to death on 16 May 2008
- Conviction: Murder
- Criminal charges: Murder, kidnapping, robbery, etc.
- Penalty: Life imprisonment

Details
- Country: India
- States: Uttar Pradesh, Delhi, Haryana and Rajasthan, India
- Targets: Taxi and truck drivers
- Imprisoned at: Tihar Jail

Devendra or Devinder or Dr. Devendra Sharma, also known as Doctor Death, is an Indian serial killer and Ayurveda doctor who was sentenced to life imprisonment in 2004 in Delhi (Sessions Court, South District, Saket Court ) after he was found guilty of several murders of taxi drivers between 2002 and 2004.

He confessed to his involvement in more than 50 to 100 murders. and dumping the bodies of victims in crocodile-infested canals. The exact number of killings is unknown as he said, "he had lost count after 50 murders", as reported by media. He is convicted in 7 cases. He is also accused of running an illegal kidney transplant racket between 1994 and 2004.

== Early life ==
In 1984, he completed his graduation in Bachelor of Ayurveda, Medicine and Surgery (B.A.M.S.) from Bihar. After completing graduation, he opened his own clinic and ran it for 11 years. In 1994, he suffered a financial setback when he was scammed of Rs 11 lakh after investing in a gas dealership scheme. His father used to work for a pharmaceutical company in Siwan, Bihar.

== Criminal cases, serial killings and conviction ==
A year after being cheated in the scheme, he got into crime. He allegedly ran a fake gas agency. At the same time, he allegedly started the illegal kidney transplant racket. During an interrogation with police, he confessed that from the year 1994 to 2004, he had facilitated more than 125 kidney transplants illegally for which Sharma was paid Rs 5 lakh to 7 lakh each transplant. In 2004, he was arrested in Gurgaon, Haryana after getting caught for his involvement in kidney racket scandal. During the same period, Devendra Sharma and his gang were also involved in the abduction and murder of taxi drivers and selling the taxis in the black market of Uttar Pradesh. He used to make Rs 20,000 to 25,000 for each vehicle.

In 2004, he was sentenced to life imprisonment by a Rajasthan court in a murder case of a taxi driver in Jaipur, Rajasthan. In March 2007, Sharma along with two of his associates was found guilty of killing a taxi driver named Kamal Singh, by the ADJ court in Faridabad. He was charged with murdering 21 taxi drivers. On 14 May 2008, he was sentenced to death penalty for murdering a taxi driver named Naresh Verma by a Gurgaon court. He confessed to killing more than 50 people. He has been convicted in a 6-7 murder cases.

In January 2020, Devendra Sharma was released on 20 days parole after being in jail for 16 years. In July 2020, he was arrested by Delhi Police after jumping parole. He was released on a two-month parole on 9 June 2023 but failed to return to prison. In May 2025, he was arrested by the Delhi Police from an ashram in Dausa, Rajasthan, where he had been living as a priest.

== See also ==
- List of serial killers by country
