= 47th Armoured Regiment (India) =

Indian Army regiment

47 Armoured Regiment
- Insignia of 47th Armoured regiment
- Active: 1982 – present
- Country: India
- Allegiance: India
- Branch: Indian Army
- Type: Armoured Corps
- Size: Regiment
- Mottos: सर्वत्र विजय "Sarvatra Vijay" (Victory everywhere)
- Colors: French Grey, Red and Gold
- Equipment: T-72

Commanders
- Colonel of the Regiment: Lieutenant General Mohit Malhotra
- Notable commanders: Lt Gen Dewan Rabindranath Soni, PVSM, VSM

Insignia
- Abbreviation: 47 Armd Regt

Presentation of 'President’s Standard' on 21 October 2017
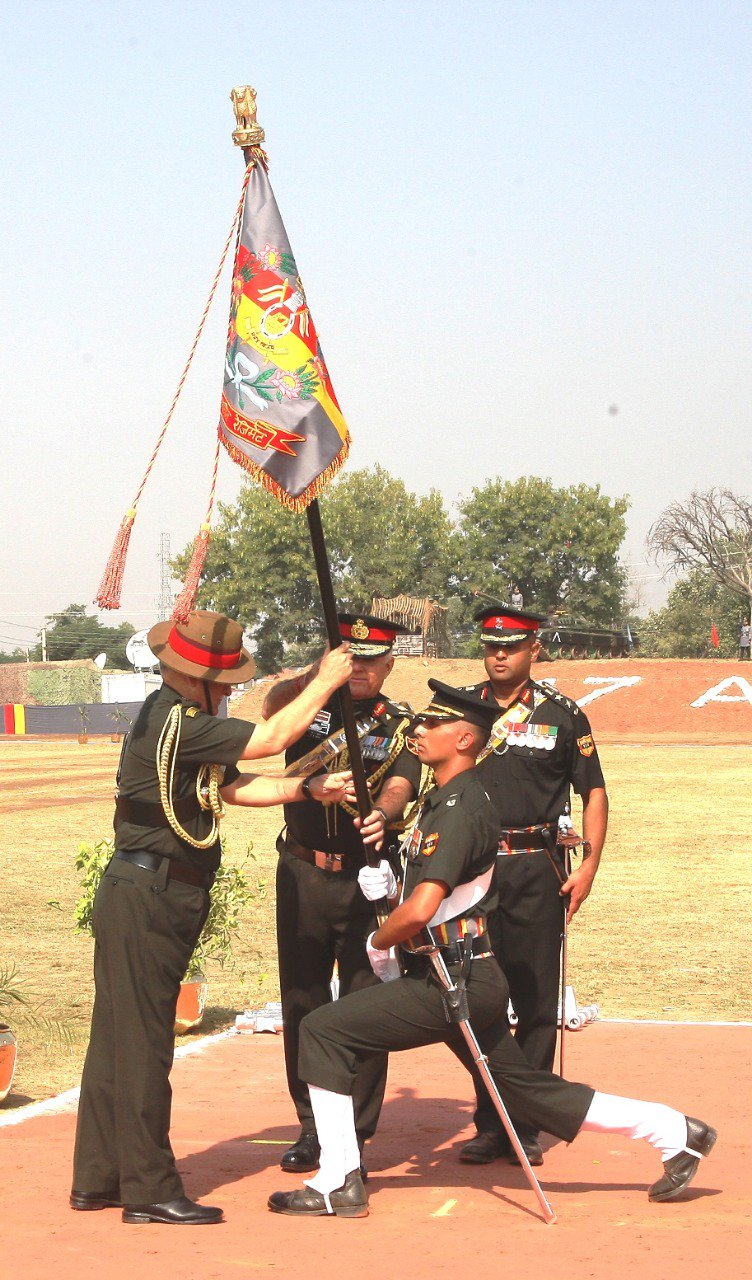
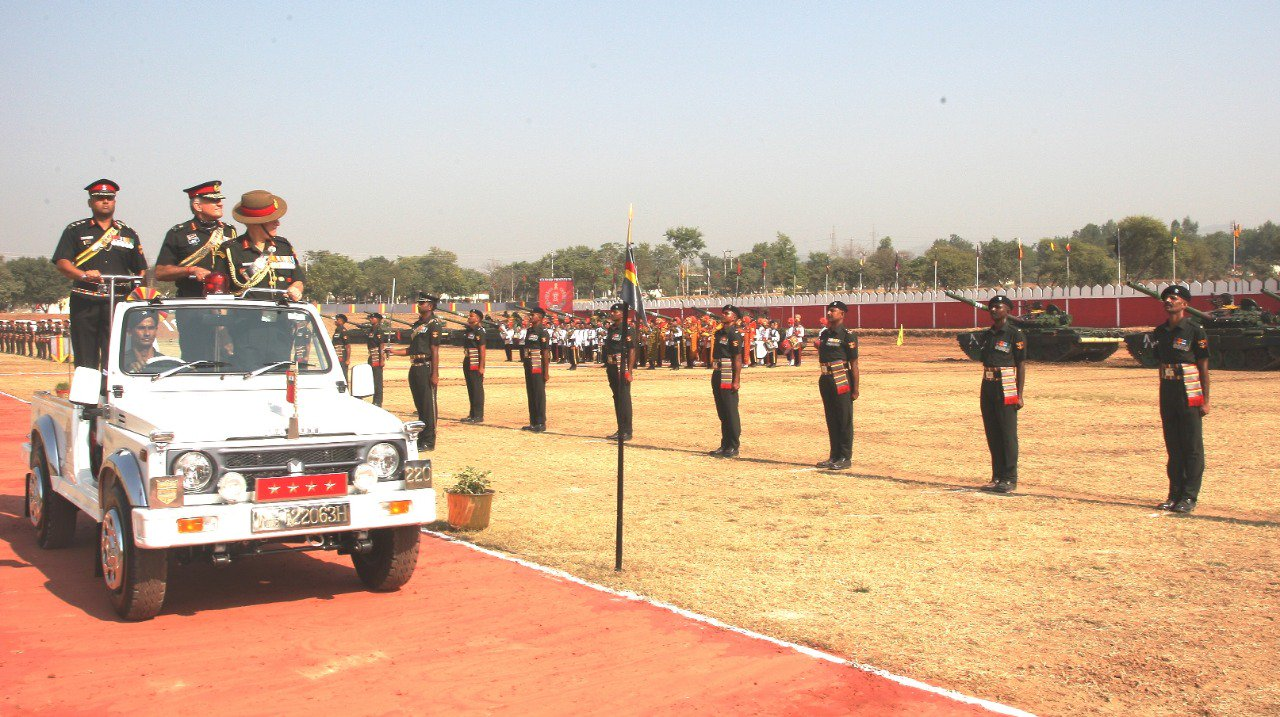
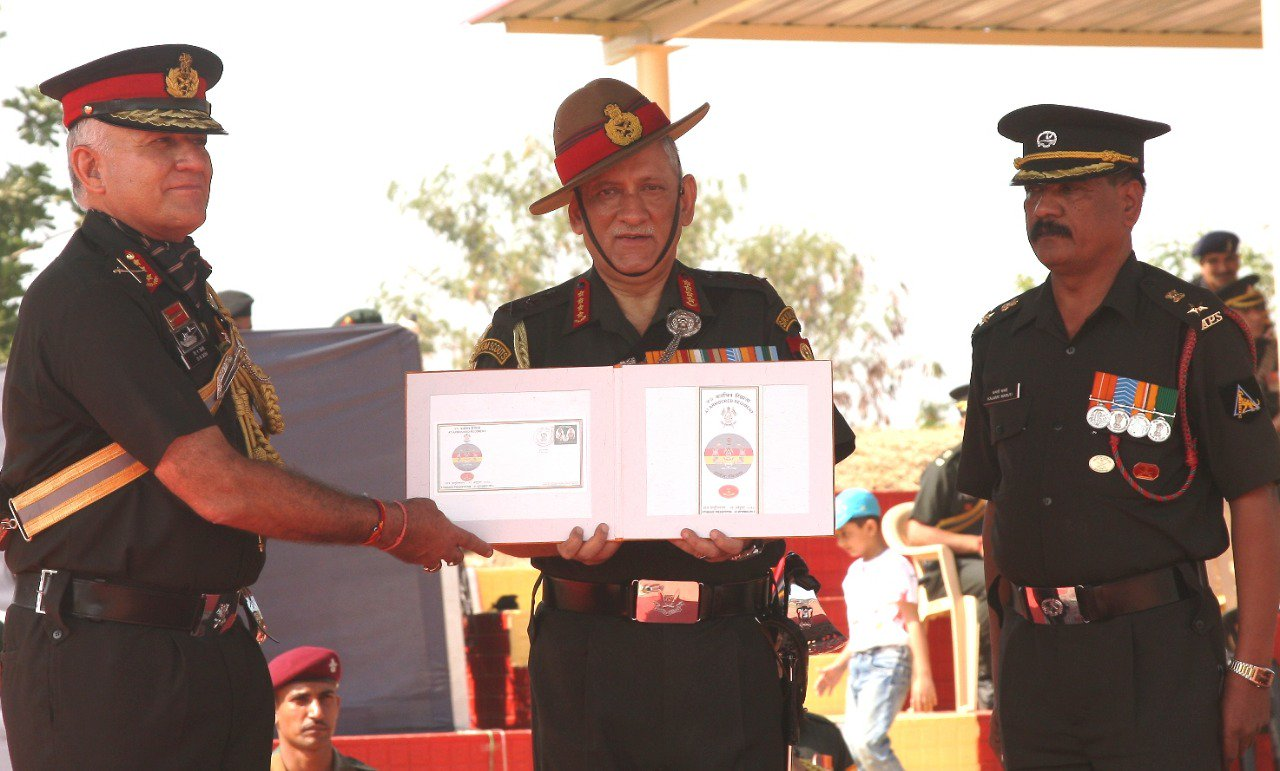
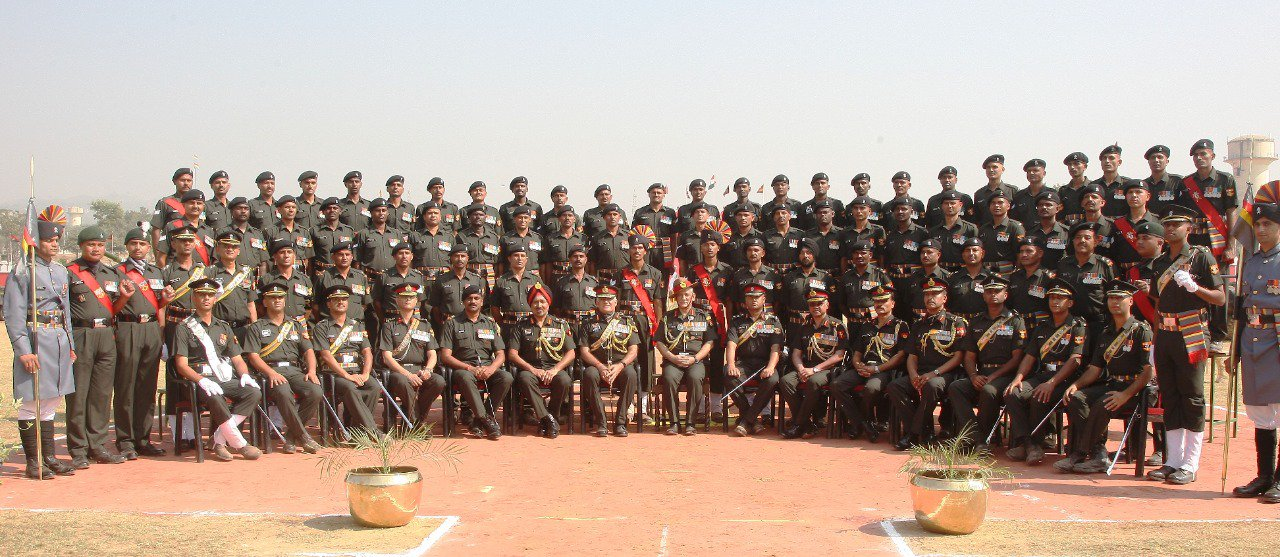

47 Armoured Regiment is an armoured regiment of the Indian Army.

== Formation ==
47 Armoured Regiment was raised on 15 November 1982 at Babina under the command of Colonel Tejvir Singh Sirohi based on a ‘mixed class composition’ and equipped with T-72 tanks.

== History ==
The Regiment was presented the ‘President’s Standards’ at Sunjuwan Military Station, Jammu on 21 October 2017 by General Bipin Rawat, Chief of the Army Staff, on behalf of the President of India, Mr Ram Nath Kovind. The men of the Regiment have been awarded 2 Vishisht Seva Medals and 10 Army Commander’s Commendation Cards.

The regiment had the honour to participate in the Republic Day Parade in 1993 with its T-72 tanks.

== Operations ==
The regiment has participated in Operation Trident, Operation Vijay, Operation Rakshak and Operation Parakram. The Regiment has also contributed personnel for Rashtriya Rifles.

== Regimental Insignia ==
The colours of the Regiment are French Grey (signifies the dauntless strength of steel), Red (signifies blood and sacrifice) and Gold (signifies glory). The Regimental motto is “Sarvatra Vijay” which means “Victory Everywhere”. The Regimental insignia consists of crossed lances with pennons with the Regimental Colours of Red and Gold over a French Grey base. The numeral "47" is inscribed between the crossing of the lances inside a horse shoe, mounted with a "mailed fist" or gauntlet and a scroll added at the base with the regimental motto (Sarvatra Vijay) inscribed in Devanagari script on it. The shoulder title consists of the numeral "47" in brass. The battle cry of the Regiment is “Bharat Mata Ki Jai”.
