= 41st Armoured Regiment (India) =

Indian Army regiment

- Active: 1918–1921, 1980 – present
- Country: (British Raj) Indian Empire 1918–1921; India 1980–Present
- Allegiance: India
- Branch: British Indian Army; Indian Army
- Type: Armour
- Size: Regiment
- Motto: Shauryameva jayate (Valour triumphs)
- Equipment: T-72

Commanders
- Colonel of the Regiment: Lieutenant General Mohit Malhotra

Insignia
- Abbreviation: 41 Armd Regt

The 41st Armoured Regiment is part of the Armoured Corps of the Indian Army.

== History ==
=== 41st Cavalry Regiment ===
During World War I, a regiment named the 41st Cavalry Regiment was raised at Baleli by Major John Hope Hallowes of the 15th Lancers (Cureton's Multanis). Besides the Commandant, no other officer was posted until 17 July 1918 when the regiment became active. In August 1918, two squadrons of the newly formed regiment were sent to patrol the East Persia Cordon.

41st Cavalry Regiment was raised from a squadron from Hallowes' own regiment, the Cureton's Multanis, and one squadron each from the 26th King George's Own Light Cavalry, 37th Lancers (Baluch Horse) and from the 39th Central India Horse. The ethnic composition was as follows:

- Pathans – one squadron.
- Sikhs – one squadron.
- Derajat Muslims – one squadron.
- Punjabi and Rajput Muslims – half squadron each.

== Formation ==
Drawing lineage from a cavalry regiment that existed between 1918 and 1921, the regiment was raised as an all-class regiment on 1 July 1980 by Lt Col JP Singh at Ahmednagar. The regiment's first Colonel was Maj Gen S Krishnamurthy, AVSM. It was initially equipped with Vijayanta tanks, but was re-equipped with T-72 tanks in 1997. The regiment was declared fit for war service in February 1981.

The regiment celebrated its Silver jubilee in 2006. To commemorate the special day, a Sainik Sammelan (soldier's gathering), was organised; it was attended by the founder of the Regiment - Brigadier JP Singh (retd). A number of ex-servicemen also participated in the celebrations.

The Regiment was presented the ‘President’s Standards’ at Suratgarh on 5 December 2017 by General Bipin Rawat, Chief of the Army Staff, on behalf of the President of India, Mr Ram Nath Kovind

== Operations ==
The Regiment has seen action during Operation Trident, Operation Rakshak (March 88 – Dec 96), Operation Vijay, Operation Parakram and Operation Rakshak (January 09 – September 11). The regiment has to its honour several awards including 1 Sena Medal, two Vishisht Seva Medals and several commendations.

== Cap badges ==
The cap badge of the 41st Cavalry Regiment till its disbandment in 1921 was silver and consisted of the letter "C" in the shape of a horseshoe with the numeral "41" within. The shoulder title was a numeral "41" atop the word "CAVALRY" curved concavely.

The present Regiment's first cap badge depicted a pair of crossed lances with pennons. The numeral "41" was placed at the crossing and the a scroll with the words "ARMD REGT" placed below the crossing. The cap badge was later changed by replacing the scroll motto with "Shauryameva Jayate" in Devanagari script.
