= 2nd Lancers (Gardner's Horse) =

Armoured regiment of the Indian Army

- Insignia of 2nd Lancers, Indian Army
- Active: 1809–present
- Country: India
- Allegiance: British India; India
- Branch: British Indian Army; Indian Army
- Type: Armoured Regiment
- Size: Regiment
- Part of: Indian Armoured Corps
- Nickname: Gardner's Horse
- Motto: Sher Tayar Hai
- Engagements: Nepal War; First World War; Battle of the Somme; Battle of Bazentin; Battle of Flers–Courcelette; Hindenburg Line; Battle of Cambrai; Occupation of the Jordan Valley; Battle of Megiddo; Capture of Afulah and Beisan; Second World War; Battle of Gazala; Indo-Pakistani War of 1965; Battle of Phillora; Battle of Chawinda

Commanders
- Colonel of the Regiment: General Dhiraj Seth
- Notable commanders: Gen Rajendrasinhji Jadeja; Gen Bipin Chandra Joshi; Gen Dhiraj Seth; Lt Gen Hriday Kaul; Lt Gen R Sharma

The 2nd Lancers (Gardner's Horse) is one of the oldest and highly decorated armoured regiments of the Indian Army. The regiment was formed by the amalgamation of two of the oldest regiments of the Bengal Army – the 2nd Royal Lancers (Gardner's Horse) and the 4th Cavalry.

== Early history ==
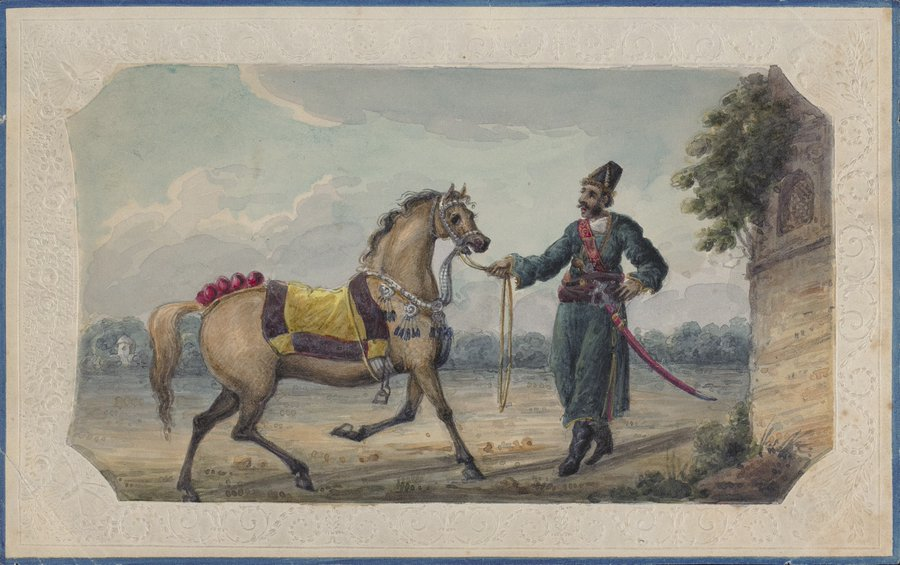
‘An Officer of Col Gardiner’s irregular Cavalry’, 1818 CE.

The regiment was raised in 1809 at Farukhabad and Mainpuri by William Linnæus Gardner. Gardner had previously served with the 74th Highlanders and the Maratha ruler of Indore. Gardner joined the East India Company's forces under Gerard Lake, 1st Viscount Lake and raised the regiment.

The regiment was initially deployed for policing duties in the newly occupied territories around Agra. It was almost exclusively composed of Hindustani Mahomedans, with a small minority of Rajputs and Brahmins. Gardner was one among several British officers such as James Skinner and Sir John Hearsey, who had become leaders of irregular cavalry, that preserved the traditions of Mughal cavalry. This had a political purpose because it absorbed pockets of cavalrymen who might otherwise become disaffected plunderers.

The regiment first saw service in 1815, during the Anglo-Nepalese War. The regiment showed meritorious service against the Pindari between 1817 and 1819. In late 1819, it was employed on the Eastern frontier invading Arakan. The regiment fought on horses and after losing most of their mounts, fought on foot. They were the only regiment to win the honour ‘Arracan’.

The 4th Cavalry was raised by Captain C. Newbury at Sultanpur as a cavalry regiment under the company's orders for service with the Nawab of Oudh in 1838. The regiment was later transferred to the Bengal Army in 1840 and saw service in Scinde and the Baloch frontier in 1844, for which they received the Honorary Standard bearing the device of a lion.

=== Uniform ===
The dress of the regiment originally consisted of an emerald green alkhalak, red pai-jamaas(later changed to the "Multani Mutti" color), and the Persian "Qizilbash" hat (which was later changed to a cloth cap and then a red turban).

==== 2nd Lancers ====
- Uniform: Blue, Facings: Light Blue, Lace: Gold, Pagri: Dark Blue and Light Blue (1902)

==== 4th Lancers ====
- Uniform: Scarlet, Facings: Blue, Lace: Gold, Pagri: Dark Blue and Light Blue (1902)

== Company rule in India ==
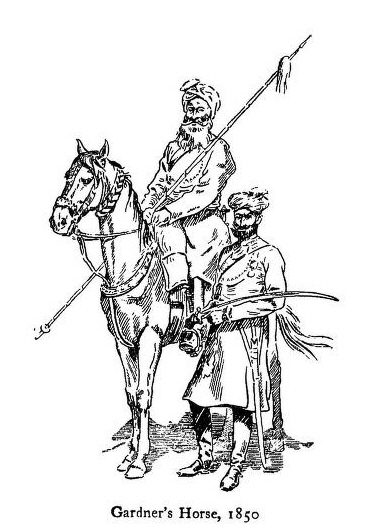
Gardner's Horse, 1850 from Armies of India by A.C. Lowett

The 2nd Lancers participated in the Sutlej and Punjab expeditions against the Sikhs in 1846 and 1848. In 1855, they were in Bengal quelling the Santhal rebellion. During the Indian Rebellion of 1857, the 2nd regiment saw action in Gogera and Gurdaspur districts, while the 4th fought in Multan. In 1882, the 2nd were sent to Egypt to fight dismounted at Kassassin and mounted at the Battle of Tell El Kebir.

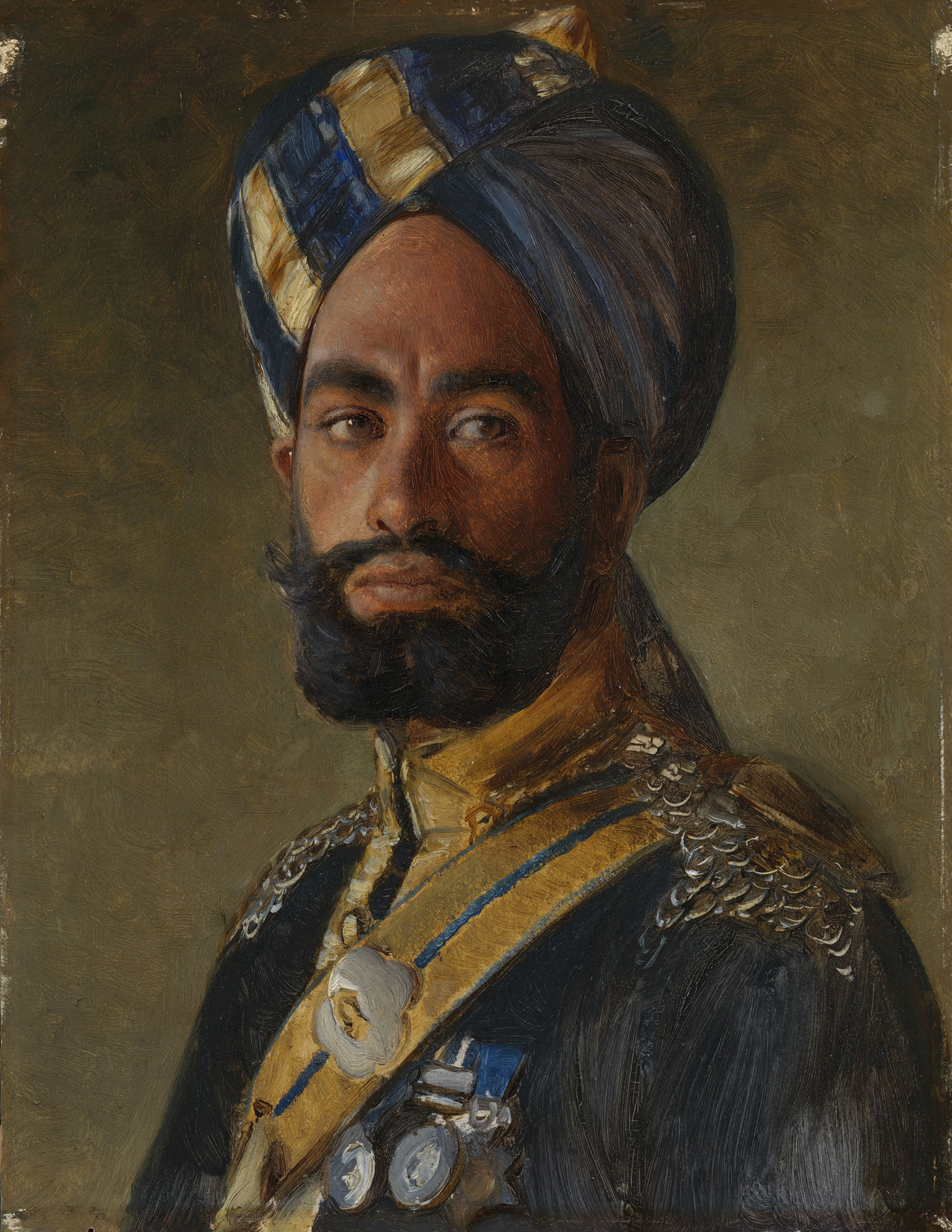
Risaldar-Major Ali Muhammad Khan, 2nd Bengal Lancers by Rudolf Swoboda

== British Raj ==
=== World War I ===
The 2nd Lancers was sent to France in the World War I as part of the 5th (Mhow) Cavalry Brigade, 2nd Indian Cavalry Division. It was brigaded with the 6th (Inniskilling) Dragoons and the 38th King George's Own Central India Horse. Once in France, its personnel were called upon to serve in the trenches as infantry. The high number of officer casualties suffered early on had an effect on performance. British officers who understood the language, customs and psychology of their men could not be quickly replaced, and the alien environment of the Western Front had some effect on the soldiers. During their time on the Western Front, the regiment was involved in the Battle of the Somme, Battle of Bazentin, Battle of Flers–Courcelette, the Advance to the Hindenburg Line and the Battle of Cambrai.

In February 1918, they left France for Egypt, joining the Egyptian Expeditionary Force, 10th Cavalry Brigade, 4th Cavalry Division in the Desert Mounted Corps. From May 1918, the regiment took part in General Edmund Allenby's Palestine section of the Sinai and Palestine Campaign. After taking part in the Occupation of the Jordan Valley, on 20 September 1918 when infantry and cavalry divisions in three corps, enveloped two Ottoman armies in the Judean Hills during the Battle of Megiddo, the 2nd Lancers, commanded by Captain, temporary Major and Acting Lieutenant Colonel, Douglas Davison launched an improvised cavalry charge which broke the Ottoman line defending the Jezreel Valley. Captain D.S. Davison was awarded the DSO for his part in this battle. On the same day, the 4th Cavalry Division captured the towns of Afulah and Beisan, along with around 100 German personnel, aircraft, trucks and railway stock. The regiment was also involved in Lieutenant General Harry Chauvel's pursuit to Damascus along the Pilgrims Road via Deraa. The regiment returned to India in December 1920.

The 4th Cavalry proceeded to France in 1914 as the Meerut Divisional Cavalry. At the Battle of Festubert, they were rushed into battle and along with the 2nd Black Watch, held the line fighting in the trenches in hand-to-hand combat and with their lances. They were transferred to Iraq in the winter of 1915 and took part in the actions to relieve Kut. The 4th finally arrived in India in the winter of 1917.

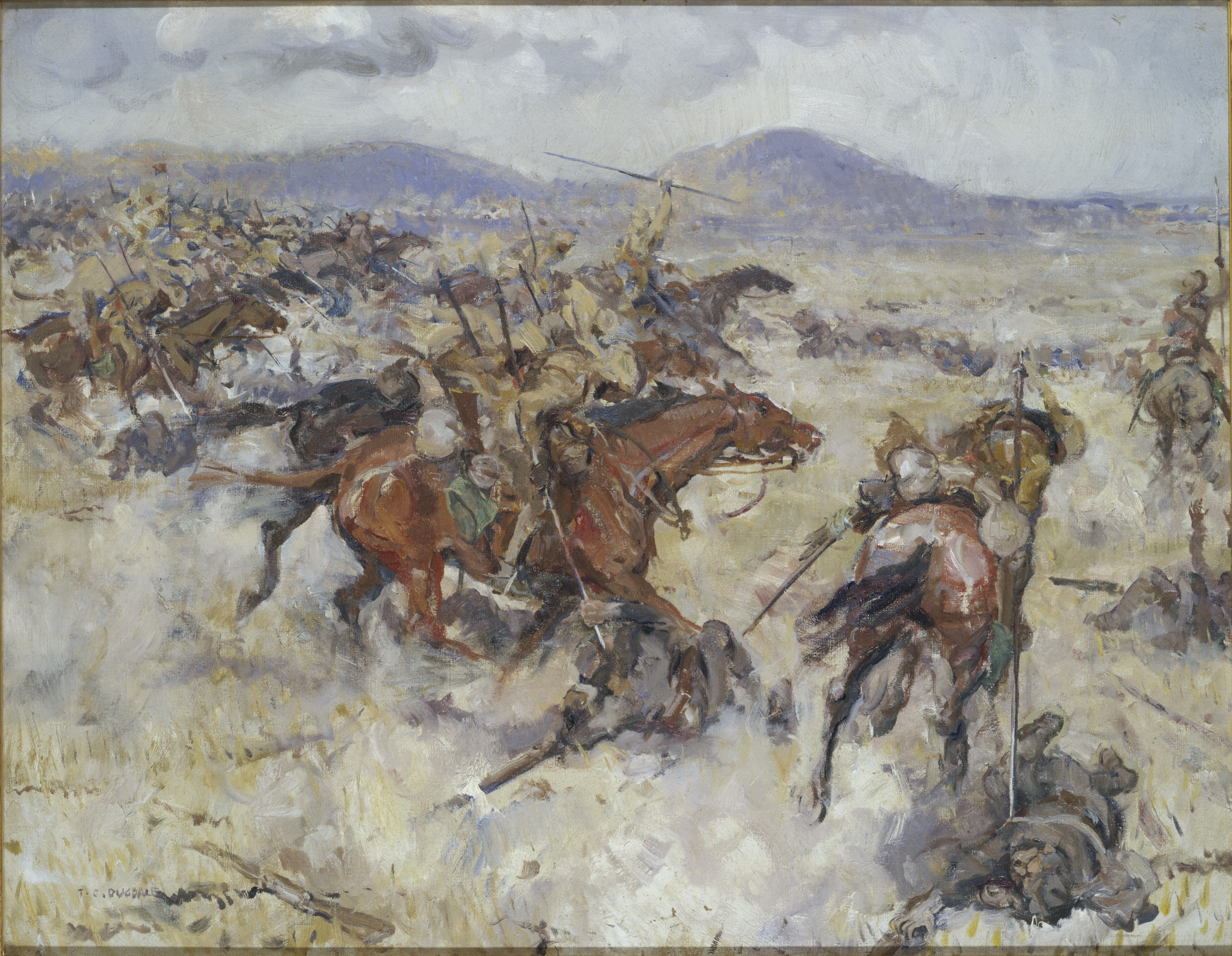
Charge of the 2nd Lancers at El Afuli - in the Valley of Armageddon

==== Gallantry awards ====
- Victoria Cross : The regiment's only Victoria Cross was awarded, during the First World War, to Gobind Singh a Lance-Daffadar (corporal) in the 27th Light Cavalry attached to the 2nd Lancers (Gardner's Horse). On 12 December 1917, east of Pezières, Singh volunteered three times to carry messages between the regiment and brigade headquarters, a distance of 1.5 miles (2.4 km) over open ground which was under heavy fire. He succeeded in delivering the messages, although on each occasion his horse was shot from under him and he was compelled to finish the journey on foot.
- Albert Medal : The Albert Medal is awarded for "daring and heroic actions performed by mariners and others in danger of perishing, by reason of wrecks and other perils of the sea". It was awarded on 15 March 1919 to Trooper Mangal Sain, 2nd Indian Lancers (Gardner's Horse) at Beirut, Lebanon. Whilst guarding a party of Turkish prisoners who were being allowed to swim, he saved a prisoner and a British soldier from drowning.
- Distinguished Service Order : Captain Douglas Stewart Davison
- Military Cross : Captain Edward William Drummond Vaughan, Lieutenant Ernest St. John King, Risaldar Mukand Singh (2nd Lancers)
- Order of British India : Risaldar Mukand Singh, Risaldar Major Ganga Dat, Risaldar Suraj Singh (2nd Lancers); Risaldar Major Awal Khan, Risaldar Major Saddha Singh, Risaldar Major Kanaya Ram (4th Cavalry)
- Indian Order of Merit : Risaldar Suraj Singh, Sowar / Acting Lance Dafadar Udey Singh, Lance Dafadar Anokh Singh, Sowar Liakat Hussain, Acting Lance Dafadar Sahib Singh, Sowar Shahzad Khan, Dafadar Chuni Lal (2nd Lancers); Lance Dafadar Puran Singh, Lance Dafadar Khazan Singh (4th Cavalry)
- Indian Distinguished Service Medal : 2nd Lancers – 26 medals, 4th Cavalry – 5 medals
- Indian Meritorious Service Medal : 2nd Lancers – 51 medals, 4th Cavalry – 10 medals
- Médaille militaire : Kot Dafadar Sant Singh (2nd Lancers)
- Croix de guerre (Belgium) : Sowar Banagopal Singh (2nd Lancers)
- Cross of Kara George, 1st Class with Swords : Lance Dafadar Khazan Singh (4th Cavalry)
- Medal of St. George, 1st Class : Dafadar Amanatullah Khan (4th Cavalry)

=== Amalgamation ===
In late 1920, the 4th Cavalry were sent to Palestine on occupation duties, not returning to India until January 1922. At Bombay, in April 1922 they amalgamated with the 2nd Lancers (Gardner's Horse) to form the 2nd/4th Cavalry. However this title was short-lived and the new unit was retitled 2nd Lancers (Gardner's Horse) by July 1922.

=== Second World War ===
The regiment served in the Western Desert campaign during the Second World War as part of the 3rd Indian Motor Brigade, 7th Armoured Division. It was brigaded with the 18th King Edward's Own Cavalry and the 11th Prince Albert Victor's Own Cavalry (Frontier Force). It also supplied men for the Indian Long Range Squadron. It fought during the first Axis offensive, their counter-attack following Operation Compass.

In 1942, during the Battle of Gazala, the 3rd Indian Motor Brigade was based near Bir Hacheim and formed the southernmost point of the Gazala Line. On 27 May 1942, Italy's Ariete Armoured Division overran the brigade. After this action, the shattered remains of the brigade were reformed at Buq Buq. The brigade was formed into two strong columns, Shercol and Billicol, with the 2nd Royal Lancers supplying some men and equipment to both. The remainder of the regiment were assigned to protect the rear Brigade headquarters and the "B" echelons. Neither column lasted long. In the early hours of 24 June 1942, Shercol was smashed after running into an Italian force in the dark. This provide to be the end of the 3rd Indian Motor Brigade's role in the Desert War. On 30 June, the Brigade handed over 50 per cent of its vehicles to the Eighth Army. The brigade was dispersed in July, the 2nd Lancers moved to Haifa in Palestine. The brigade was reformed in August. It travelled overland to Sahneh in Persia via Baghdad, coming under the command of 31st Indian Armoured Division. It remained there until late November, when they moved to Shaibah, seven miles 7 miles (11 km) from Basra. From here the Regiment returned to India in January 1943.

After a three-month stay at Ferozepore, the Regiment moved to Risalpur, where it was converted to an Armoured Car Regiment, in Training Brigade. In October, the regiment marched to Quetta. The same month, Lieutenant-Colonel Maharaj Rajendra Sinhji became the first Indian to take over the command of the regiment, and was also the first Indian to command an armoured regiment. In May 1944, the regiment moved again to Allahabad, then Lucknow after a short stay then back to the frontier in October to Kohat, relieving the 16th Light Cavalry. They were still at Kohat when the war ended.

==== Gallantry awards ====
- Distinguished Service Order : Major Raj Kumar Shri Rajendrasinghji
- Military Cross : Captain A.H. McConnel, Captain D McV Reynolds, 2nd J.E. Miller, Captain CF Williams, Jemadar Hari Raj Singh, Jemadar Lakhi Ram, Jemadar Ran Pratap Singh
- Indian Order of Merit : Lance Dafadar Mehbub Ali Khan
- Indian Distinguished Service Medal : Risaldar Lakhan Singh, Daffadar Risal Singh, Daffadar Ghulam Rabani
- Military Medal : Sowar Mohd Salim Khan

== Independent India ==
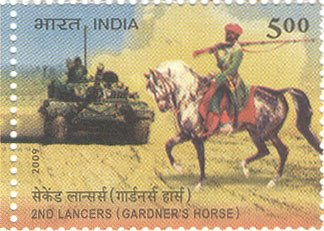
Bicentenary of 2nd Lancers (Gardner's Horse) - commemorative stamp (2009)

In August 1947, the Regiment was based on Malaya and fought against the communist guerrillas. In December, the regiment returned to India. The Partition of India split the regiment, several Muslim troops of the 'A' squadron, opted to join the Pakistan Army. They set sail for Karachi in November 1947. In 1948, the remaining Muslim soldiers were posted to the 18th King Edward's Own Cavalry, and in turn the 2nd Lancers received a Rajput squadron. The regiment was then formed of two Rajput and one Jat squadron.

In January 1953, General Maharaj Rajendra Shinji assumed the appointment of the Chief of Army Staff of the Indian Army. He was the first officer from the 2nd Lancers, as well as from the armoured corps, to become the Army chief. In November 1961, the regiment (as well as the Scinde Horse) was awarded a guidon by the President, Rajendra Prasad for its distinguished record during peacetime and wartime, the first regiment in the armoured corps to have such an award.

=== 1965 War ===
In September 1965, the 2nd Lancers took part in the Indo-Pakistani War of 1965 as part of the 43 Lorried Brigade Group of the 1st Armoured Division. The regiment was equipped with M4 Sherman tanks (Mk V and VI variants), and fought in the Battle of Phillora and the Battle of Chawinda. For their performance in these battles, the regiment was awarded the honour of "PUNJAB". Sowar Jit Singh Sansanwal was awarded the Sena Medal and 4 were mentioned in despatches.

=== Post-war ===
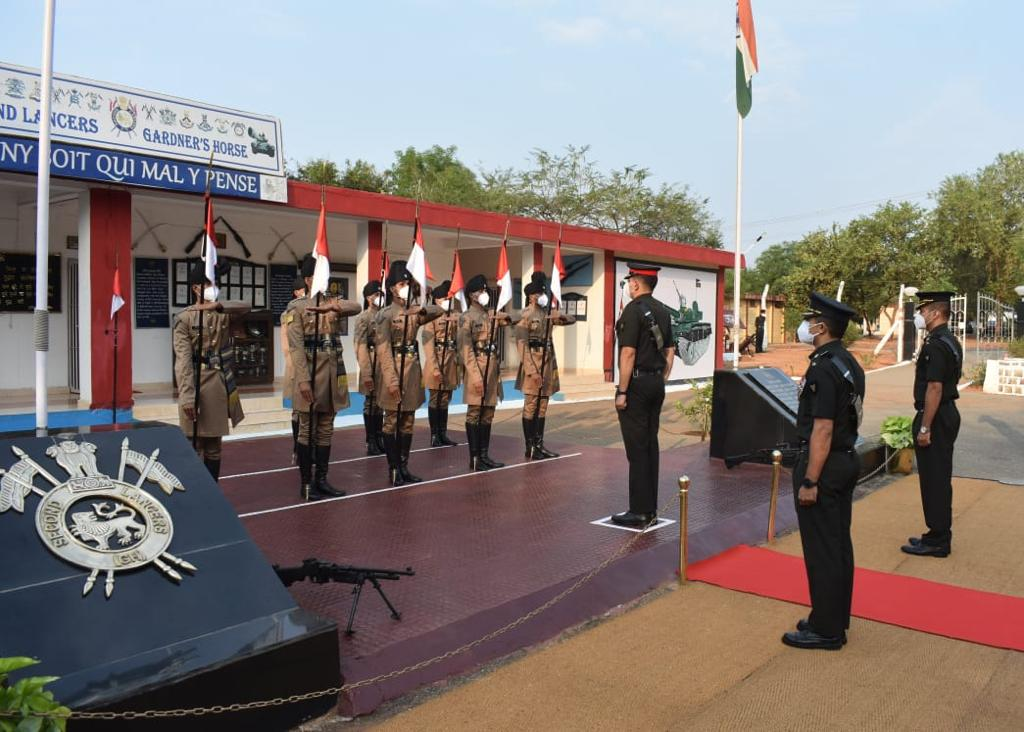
2nd Lancers celebrating its 212th Raising Day, 12 May 2021. The regimental motto and insignia can be seen.

On 10 August 1966, following the war, the regiment was the first in the military to receive the Vijayanta main battle tanks, the first indigenously built Indian tanks. The regiment is currently equipped with Soviet-era T-72 tanks.

== Designations ==
Like all regiments of the Indian Army, the 2nd Lancers (Gardner's Horse) underwent many name changes during various reorganisations, as listed below -

- 1809 Gardner's Horse
- 1823 2nd (Gardner's) Local horse
- 1840 2nd Irregular Cavalry
- 1861 2nd Regt. of Bengal Cavalry
- 1890 2nd Regt. Of Bengal Lancers
- 1901 2nd Bengal Lancers
- 1903 2nd Lancers (Gardner's Horse)
- 1922 (April) 2nd/4th Cavalry
- 1922 (July) 2nd Lancers (Gardner's Horse)
- 1935 2nd Royal Lancers (Gardner's Horse)
- 1947 To Indian Army upon Partition
- 1950 2nd Lancers (Gardner's Horse) upon India becoming a Republic

== Battle Honours ==
Arracan, Sobraon, Punjaub, Mooltan, Afghanistan 1879–80, Tel-El-Kabir, Egypt 1882, La Bassee 1914, Givenchy 1914, Neuve Chapelle, Festubert 1915, Somme 1916, Morval, Cambrai 1917, France and Flanders 1914–18, Egypt 1915, Meggido, Sharon Damascus, Palestine 1918, Tigris 1916, Mesopotamia 1915–16, Afghanistan 1919, North Africa 1940–43, Point 171, Punjab.

== Regimental Day ==
During First World War, for its gallant actions in the Battle of Cambrai in France the regiment was mentioned in the Cambrai Dispatch by Field Marshall Lord Douglas Haig. Since, then Cambrai Day i.e. 30 November is celebrated as a Battle Honour day.

== Alliance ==
The alliance between the Royal Tank Regiment and 2nd Lancers (Gardner's Horse) was promulgated in Defence Council Instruction (Army) T 52 of 1973.

== Notable Officers ==
The regiment has the unique honour of producing three Chiefs of Army Staff (COAS) - General Maharaj Shri Rajendrasinhji Jadeja DSO, General Bipin Chandra Joshi PVSM, AVSM, ADC and General Dhiraj Seth PVSM, UYSM, AVSM.

The Regiment also holds the distinction of having produced one Army Commander, Lieutenant General Hriday Kaul PVSM, AVSM (GOC-in-C Western Command) and one Deputy Chief of the Army Staff, Lieutenant General R Sharma PVSM, AVSM.

Lion Passant Reguardant

== Regimental Insignia ==
The 2nd Bengal Lancers insignia consisted of four crossed lances with the letters ‘’2BL’’, whereas the 4th Bengal Lancers had two crossed lances overlaid by the crown and mounted by the lion passant guardant – derived from the Honorary Standard it received in 1844. Earning the nickname, the “Sindh Lions” all ranks of the Regiment were authorized to wear on its accoutrements a badge representing a unique Lion “Passant Ragardant”. The lances are overlaid by a scroll with the word ‘’SCINDE’’ and the Roman numeral ‘’IV’’.

Following the amalgamation of the successor units, the 2nd Lancers insignia combined elements from both units – it consisted of a central voided lion surrounded by circular band with HONI SOIT QUI MAL Y PENSE, all superimposed on four crossed lances with the crown above the band. Post independence, the insignia consists of a lion passant reguardant surrounded by a belt inside which is the embossed inscription: SECOND LANCERS (G.H.), the belt is surmounted by the Lions of Ashoka and is backed by four crossed lances. Second Lancers (Gardener's Horse) is the only unit in the Indian Army which is authorised to bear its unique insignia of the Lion on all its vehicles during peace time.

The shoulder title consisted of "2RL" prior to independence and "2L" after independence.

== Deployments ==
=== 2nd Lancers ===
- Jalandhar (?? - 4 January 1902)
- Nowshera (4 January 1902 - ??)
- Faizabad (?? - ??)

=== 4th Lancers ===
- Loralai (4 February 1901 - ??)
- Allahabad (?? - ??)

== Commandant ==
=== 2nd Lancers ===
- Lieutenant-Colonel K. S. Davison (?? - 17 November 1901)

=== 4th Lancers ===
- Lieutenant-Colonel W. G. Yate (?? - 9 November 1900)

== Class Composition ==
=== 2nd Lancers ===
- 1 squadron each of Sikhs, Jats, Rajputs, and Hindustani Muslims (1902)

=== 4th Lancers ===
- 1 squadron each of Muslim Rajputs, Hindustani Muslims, Sikhs, and Jats (1902)
