= 75th Independence Anniversary Medal =

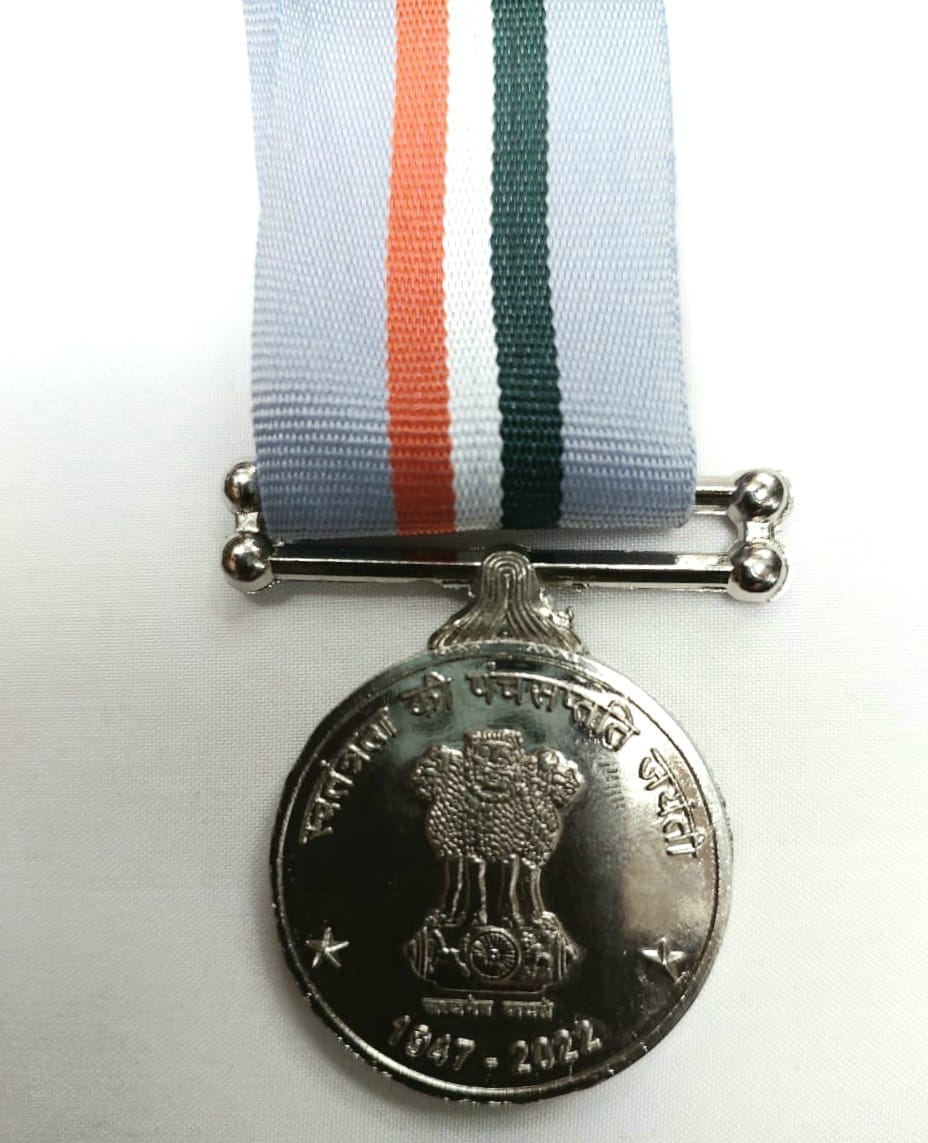
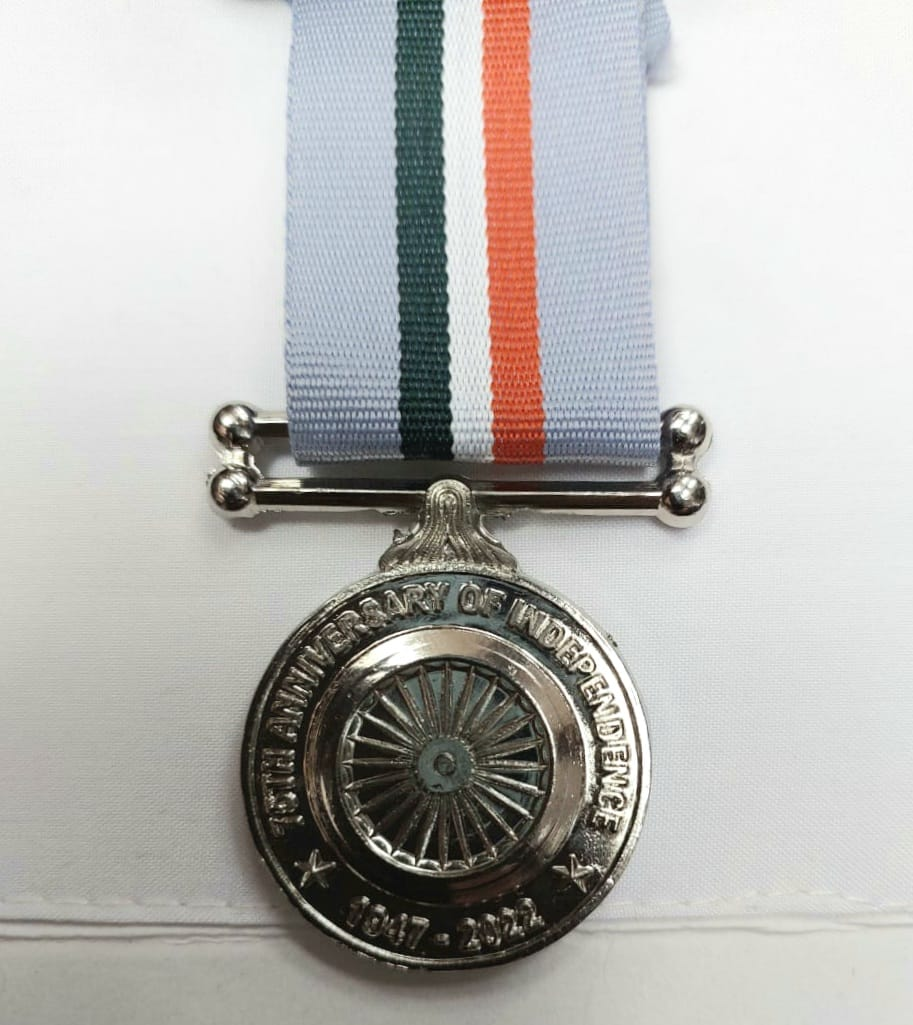
- Medal Obverse and Reverse
- Type: Service medal
- Awarded for: All Armed Forces personnel borne on strength on 15 August 2022.
- Presented by: India
- Eligibility: Members of the Indian Armed Forces, Territorial Army, Para Military Force, Central Police Organisations, and Police Forces
- Established: 2022
- Ribbon bar

Precedence
- Next (higher): Indian Police Independence Medal
- Next (lower): 50th Independence Anniversary Medal

The 75th Independence Anniversary Medal was issued to commemorate the historic occasion of 75 years of the independence of India.

== Criteria ==
The medal was issued by the Government of India through a Presidential Notification for all personnel of Armed Forces, Central Armed Police Forces, Fire Service, Personnel of Central Police Organisations, Railway Protection Force and all state police forces borne on strength on 15 August 2022.

== Design ==
The medal is circular in shape and made of cupro-nickel. It is 35 mm in diameter and will have Lion Capital of Ashoka on the front. The back will have the Ashoka Chakra with the words 75th Anniversary of Independence along with 1947-2022. The ribbon is blue coloured and has the colours of the national flag in the middle. The background will be of 10 mm each on either side of the national flag, which will have each colour with a width of 4 mm.
