= Viresh Pratap Singh Kaushik =

Adjutant General, Indian Army

Lieutenant General Viresh Pratap Singh Kaushik PVSM UYSM YSM SM
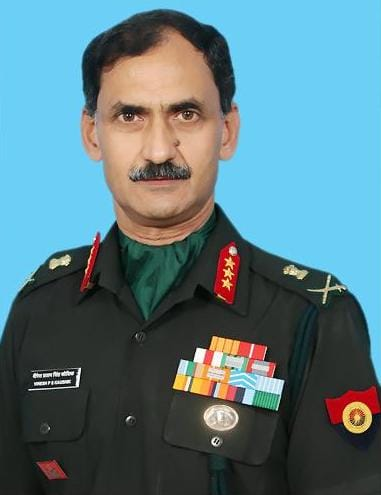

Adjutant General
- Incumbent
- Assumed office 2 August 2024
- Chief of Army Staff: Upendra Dwivedi; Dhiraj Seth
- Preceded by: Bansi Ponnappa

Military service
- Allegiance: India
- Branch/service: Indian Army
- Years of service: 11 June 1988 – Present
- Rank: Lieutenant General
- Unit: 3 Kumaon Regiment
- Commands: XXXIII Corps; IGAR (North)
- Service number: IC-47603F
- Awards: Param Vishisht Seva Medal; Uttam Yudh Seva Medal; Yudh Seva Medal; Sena Medal

Lieutenant General Viresh Pratap Singh Kaushik, PVSM, UYSM, YSM, SM is a serving officer of the Indian Army. He is currently serving as the Adjutant General of the Indian Army. He earlier served as the General Officer Commanding, XXXIII Corps.

== Early life and education ==
He is an alumnus of St. Paul’s School, Lucknow. He then attended the National Defence Academy, Khadakwasla and the Indian Military Academy, Dehradun.

== Military career ==
The general officer was commissioned into the 3rd battalion of the Kumaon Regiment on 11 June 1988 from the Indian Military Academy, Dehradun. In a career spanning over 37 years, he has undertaken numerous command, and staff appointments. He has commanded a brigade in Kargil sector and has vast experience of the North East having served in Nagaland, Manipur, Shillong and Assam.

As a Major General, he assumed charge as the Inspector General, Assam Rifles (North) on 20 March 2020. Upon promotion to the rank of Lieutenant General, he took over as the General Officer Commanding, XXXIII Corps (Trishakti Corps) on 1 November 2022 succeeding Lieutenant General Tarun Kumar Aich.

On 2 August 2024, Lieutenant General Kaushik assumed the appointment of Adjutant General succeeding Lieutenant General C. Bansi Ponnappa when the latter supperannuated on 31 July 2024.

== Personal life ==
He is one of the two sons of Major Dhirendra Nath Singh, who was an officer in the Kumaon Regiment and a veteran of the India–Pakistan War of 1965. His brother, Lieutenant General Shrinjay Pratap Singh is a serving officer in the Indian Army.

== Awards and decorations ==
During his career, he has been awarded with the Param Vishisht Seva Medal in 2026, the Uttam Yudh Seva Medal in 2024, the Yudh Seva Medal and the Sena Medal.

Param Vishisht Seva Medal	Uttam Yudh Seva Medal	Yudh Seva Medal	Sena Medal
Wound Medal	Samanya Seva Medal	Special Service Medal	Operation Parakram Medal
Sainya Seva Medal	High Altitude Medal	Videsh Seva Medal	75th Independence Anniversary Medal
50th Independence Anniversary Medal	30 Years Long Service Medal	20 Years Long Service Medal	9 Years Long Service Medal

== Date of ranks ==
Insignia	Rank	Component	Date of rank
	Second Lieutenant	Indian Army	11 June 1988
	Lieutenant	Indian Army	11 June 1990
	Captain	Indian Army	11 June 1993
	Major	Indian Army	11 June 1999
	Lieutenant Colonel	Indian Army	16 December 2004
	Colonel	Indian Army	11 June 2008
	Brigadier	Indian Army	23 May 2014 (acting) 7 September 2015 (substantive, with seniority from 8 September 2012)
	Major General	Indian Army	31 January 2020 (seniority from 20 November 2018)
	Lieutenant General	Indian Army	2022
