= Pratik Sharma =

Lieutenant General in the Indian Army

Lieutenant General Pratik Sharma SYSM PVSM AVSM SM
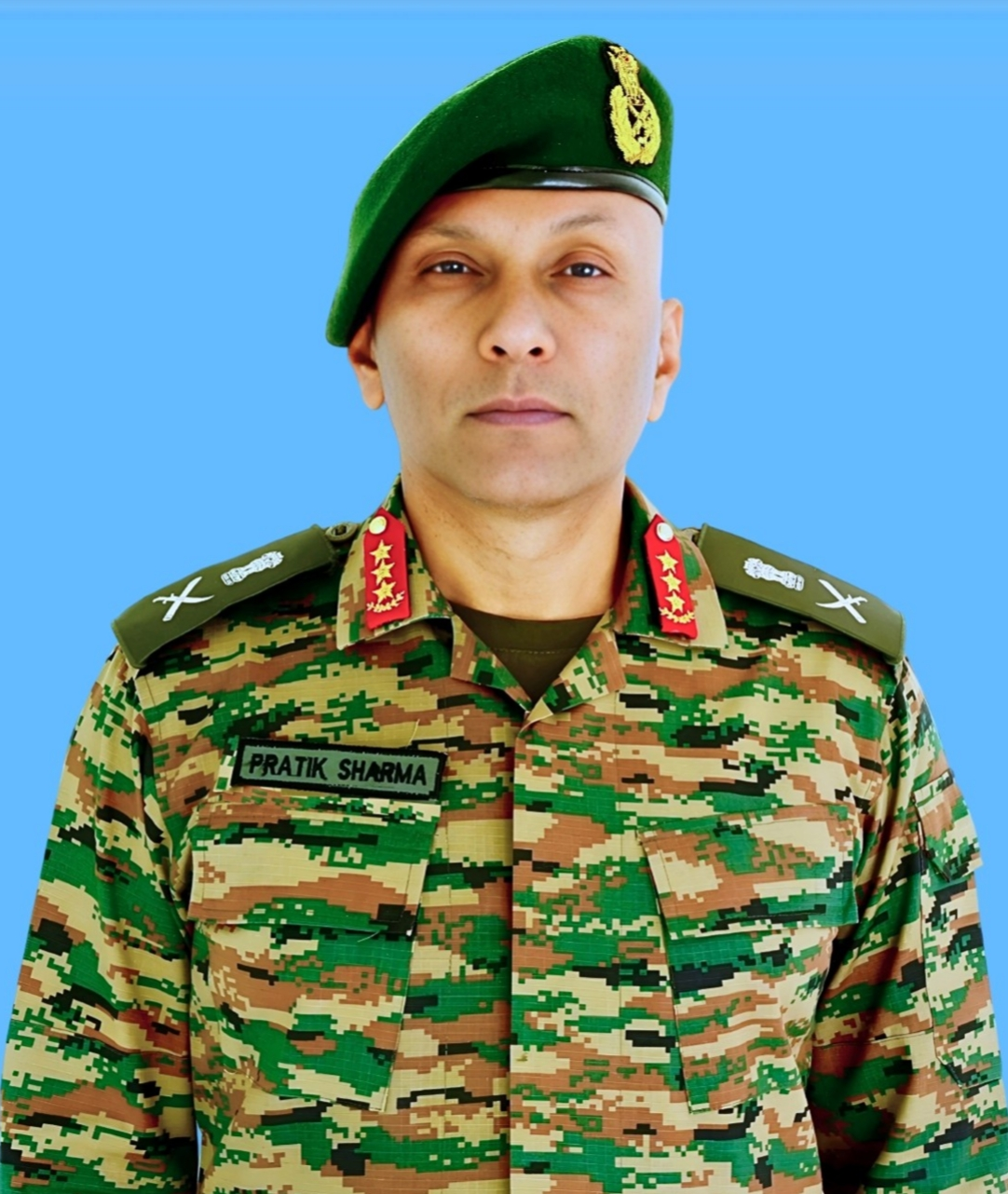

General Officer Commanding-in-Chief Northern Command
- Incumbent
- Assumed office 1 May 2025
- Chief of Army Staff: Upendra Dwivedi; Dhiraj Seth
- Preceded by: M. V. Suchindra Kumar

Deputy Chief of Army Staff (Strategy)
- In office 1 November 2024 – 30 April 2025
- Preceded by: Tarun Kumar Aich
- Succeeded by: Rajiv Ghai

Military service
- Allegiance: India
- Branch/service: Indian Army
- Years of service: 19 December 1987 – present
- Rank: Lieutenant General
- Unit: 2 Madras Regiment
- Commands: Northern Command; II Corps; 25th Infantry Division; 80 Infantry Brigade; 2 Madras Regiment
- Battles/wars: UNOCI; Operation Pawan; Operation Meghdoot; Operation Rakhskak
- Service number: IC- 47032N
- Awards: Sarvottam Yudh Seva Medal; Param Vishisht Seva Medal; Ati Vishisht Seva Medal; Sena Medal

Lieutenant General Pratik Sharma, SYSM, PVSM, AVSM, SM is a serving general officer of the Indian Army. He is currently serving as the General Officer Commanding-in-Chief Northern Command. He previously served as the Deputy Chief of Army Staff (Strategy), prior to that he was Director General of Military Operations. He earlier served as the General Officer Commanding II corps. He is also the Colonel of the Regiment of the Madras Regiment.

== Early life and education ==
The general officer is an alumnus of Uttar Pradesh Sainik School, Lucknow. He then attended the National Defence Academy, Khadakwasla and the Indian Military Academy, Dehradun. He is also an alumnus of the Defence Services Staff College, Wellington, College of Defence Management, Secunderabad and the National Defence College, New Delhi.

== Military career ==
He was commissioned into the 2nd battalion of the Madras Regiment on 19 December 1987 from the Indian Military Academy, Dehradun. He has taken part in various operations in home and abroad, which includes UNOCI. As a Brigadier, he commanded 80 Infantry Brigade in Jammu and Kashmir. As a Major General, he was appointed as General Officer Commanding 25 Infantry Division and also served in the Military Secretary's branch at the IHQ of MoD, New Delhi.

After being promoted to the rank of Lieutenant General, he was appointed as the Director General Information Warfare at the newly institutionalized Information Directorate at the Army Headquarters, New Delhi. On 21 March 2022, he took over as the General Officer Commanding Kharga Corps (II Corps) from Lieutenant general N. S. Raja Subramani. A year later on 1 July 2023, he assumed the appointment of Director General of Military Operations. After completing his term as the DGMO, on 1 November 2024 he took over as the Deputy Chief of Army Staff (Strategy) succeeding Lieutenant General Tarun Kumar Aich.

On 1 May 2025, Lieutenant General Pratik Sharma took over as the General Officer Commanding in Chief, Northern Command succeeding Lieutenant General M. V. Suchindra Kumar when the latter superannuated on 30 April 2025.

== Personal life ==
He is an cyclist and reads with a penchant for research.

== Awards and decorations ==
The general officer has been awarded with the Sarvottam Yudh Seva Medal on Independence Day 2025 for his role during Operation Sindoor, the Param Vishisht Seva Medal on Republic Day 2025, the Ati Vishisht Seva Medal in 2021 and the Sena Medal.

Sarvottam Yudh Seva Medal		Param Vishisht Seva Medal	
Ati Vishisht Seva Medal	Sena Medal		Samanya Seva Medal
Special Service Medal	Siachen Glacier Medal	Operation Parakram Medal	Sainya Seva Medal
High Altitude Medal	Videsh Seva Medal	75th Independence Anniversary Medal	50th Independence Anniversary Medal
30 Years Long Service Medal	20 Years Long Service Medal	9 Years Long Service Medal	UNOCI

== Dates of rank ==
Insignia	Rank	Component	Date of rank
	Second Lieutenant	Indian Army	19 December 1987
	Lieutenant	Indian Army	19 December 1989
	Captain	Indian Army	19 December 1992
	Major	Indian Army	19 December 1998
	Lieutenant Colonel	Indian Army	16 December 2004
	Colonel	Indian Army	1 January 2008
	Brigadier	Indian Army	25 October 2013 (acting); 9 November 2014 (substantive with seniority from 28 January 2012)
	Major General	Indian Army	1 October 2019 (seniority from 1 January 2018)
	Lieutenant General	Indian Army	9 December 2021

Military offices
Preceded by M. V. Suchindra Kumar	General Officer Commanding-in-Chief; Northern Command; 1 May 2025 – present	Succeeded by Incumbent
Preceded by Tarun Kumar Aich	Deputy Chief of the Army Staff (Strategy); 1 November 2024 – 30 April 2025	Succeeded by Rajiv Ghai
Preceded by Manoj Kumar Katiyar	Director General Military Operations; 1 July 2023 – 31 October 2024	Succeeded by Rajiv Ghai
Preceded by N. S. Raja Subramani	General Officer Commanding II Corps; 21 March 2022 – 31 May 2023	Succeeded by Rahul R Singh
