= A. Arun =

Indian Army general (born 1964)

Lieutenant General (Retd.) A. Arun PVSM, YSM, SM, VSM
- Born: India
- Education: National Defence Academy (India); Indian Military Academy
- Spouse: Roopa Arun
- Military career
- Allegiance: India
- Branch: Indian Army
- Service years: 14 December 1985 – 30 June 2024
- Rank: Lieutenant General
- Unit: 8 Grenadiers
- Commands: Dakshin Bharat Area; 7 Sector Rashtriya Rifles; 55 Rashtriya Rifles
- Awards: Param Vishisht Seva Medal; Yudh Seva Medal; Sena Medal; Vishisht Seva Medal

Lieutenant General Ananthanarayan Arun, PVSM, YSM, SM, VSM is a retired general officer of the Indian Army. He last served as the Chief of Staff of the South Western Command, Jaipur. He earlier served as the General Officer Commanding Dakshin Bharat Area and as the officiating Commandant of the Officers Training Academy, Chennai.

== Early life and education ==
Arun was born in Dindigul, Madurai in Tamil Nadu on 17th Dec 1964. He secured an All India Rank of 13 in the Joint Entrance Examination for entry into the Indian Institute of Technology. He decided to leave IIT Madras and chose to join the National Defence Academy, as part of the 67th course. He then was part of the 77th course of the Indian Military Academy.

== Military career ==
Arun was commissioned into the 8th battalion, The Grenadiers (8 GDRS) in December 1985. He attended the Defence Services Staff College, Wellington. In the rank of Colonel, he raised the 55th battalion, The Rashtriya Rifles (The Grenadiers). The battalion was deployed in a counter-insurgency role in Pulwama. For his command of 55 RR, he was awarded the Sena Medal for gallantry on 15 August 2005. In 2007, while still in command of 55 RR, he was awarded the Chief of the Army Staff's Commendation. He subsequently attended the Centre for Defence and Strategic Studies, Canberra.

Promoted to the rank of Brigadier, Arun commanded the 7 Sector Rashtriya Rifles in Handwara. For his command of 7 Sector RR, he was awarded the Yudh Seva Medal on 26 January 2014. He was then selected to attend the National Defence College in New Delhi, as part of the 55th course.

As part of the United Nations, Arun has served in the United Nations Transitional Authority in Cambodia and in the International Task Force as part of the United Nations Mission in Sierra Leone. He also served at the Headquarters of the United Nations working on the forecasting and structuring of large coalitions including significant civilian components. Arun also attended the United Nations Senior Mission Leaders Course conducted in Geneva, Switzerland.

=== General officer ===
Arun was promoted to the rank of Major General and appointed General officer commanding a mountain division in the North East. He subsequently served as the Deputy Commandant, Chief Instructor, and officiating Commandant of the Officers Training Academy, Chennai. He also served as Commandant of the Infantry School, Mhow. Promoted to the rank of Lieutenant General, he served as the Director General of Strategic Planning at Army headquarters.

On 2 January 2021, Arun was appointed the General Officer Commanding Dakshin Bharat Area. Earlier called the Andhra, Tamil Nadu, Karnataka, and Kerala Area (ATNK&K Area), the Dakshin Bharat area is a static formation that provides administrative, logistical, and infrastructure support to formations and establishments in these states as well as the union territories of Puducherry and Lakshadweep. In February 2022, he took over as the Colonel of the Grenadiers from Lieutenant General Rajeev Sirohi. In April 2023, he was appointed Chief of Staff of South Western Command in Jaipur. On 26 January 2024, he was awarded the Param Vishisht Seva Medal. He retired on 30 June 2024 after 39 years of glorious service in the Indian army.

== Personal life ==
Arun is married to Roopa Arun, an educationist and founder principal of The Cambridge International School, Bangalore. The couple has a daughter Zephyr.

== Awards and decorations ==
Arun was awarded the Sena Medal in 2005, the Yudh Seva Medal in 2014, and the Vishisht Seva Medal in 2015. He has also been awarded the Chief of the Army Staff's Commendation 4 times.

Param Vishisht Seva Medal	Yudh Seva Medal		Sena Medal
Vishisht Seva Medal	Wound Medal	Special Service Medal	Operation Vijay Medal
Operation Parakram Medal	Sainya Seva Medal	High Altitude Medal	Videsh Seva Medal
75th Independence Anniversary Medal	50th Independence Anniversary Medal	30 Years Long Service Medal	20 Years Long Service Medal
9 Years Long Service Medal	UNAMSIL Medal	UNTAC Medal	UNHQ medal

Military offices
Preceded by N. P. Rao	General Officer Commanding Dakshin Bharat Area; 2021 - 2023	Succeeded by Karanbir Singh Brar
Preceded by Manish Erry	Chief of Staff, South Western Command; 2023 - 2024	Succeeded by Harbinder Singh Vandra
