= Rajiv Ghai =

Deputy Chief of Army Staff, Indian Army

Lieutenant General Rajiv Ghai SYSM UYSM AVSM SM***
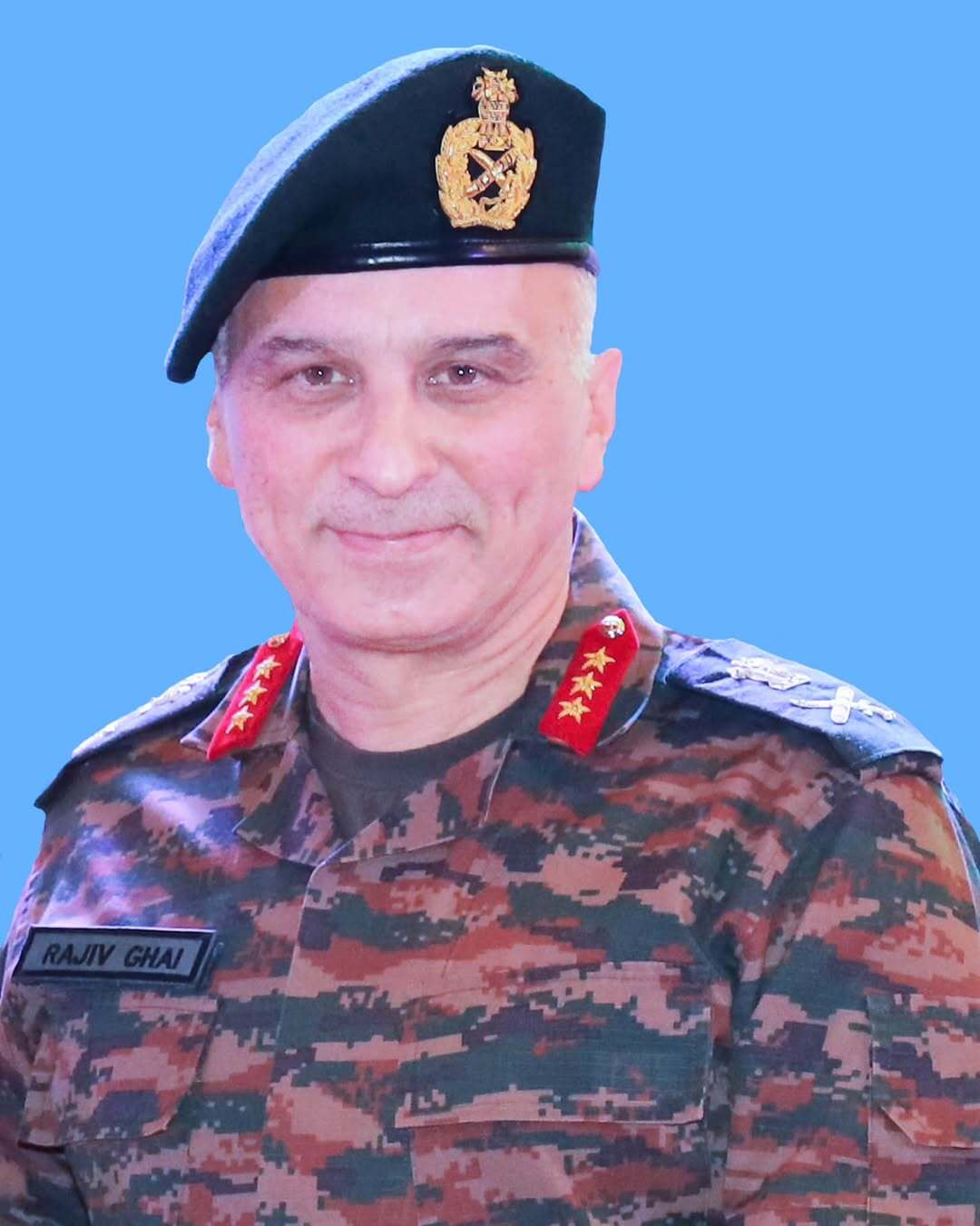

Deputy Chief of Army Staff (Strategy)
- Incumbent
- Assumed office 10 June 2025
- Chief of Army Staff: Upendra Dwivedi; Dhiraj Seth
- Preceded by: Pratik Sharma

Military service
- Allegiance: India
- Branch/service: Indian Army
- Years of service: 16 December 1989 - Present
- Rank: Lieutenant General
- Unit: Kumaon Regiment
- Commands: XV Corps; 56th Infantry Division
- Battles/wars: 2023 Anantnag encounter; Operation Sindoor
- Service number: IC-48989Y
- Awards: Sarvottam Yudh Seva Medal; Uttam Yudh Seva Medal; Ati Vishisht Seva Medal; Bar to Sena Medal & Bar

Lieutenant General Rajiv Ghai, SYSM, UYSM, AVSM, SM & Two Bars is a serving general officer of the Indian Army. He is presently serving as the Deputy Chief of Army Staff (Strategy) and as the Military Adviser to the National Security Council Secretariat. He served as the Director General of Military Operations during Operation Sindoor. He earlier served as the General Officer Commanding XV Corps. He is also the Colonel of the Kumaon Regiment & Naga Regiment & Kumaon SCOUTS.

== Early life and education ==
He is an alumnus of the Fergusson College, Pune and the Indian Military Academy, Dehradun. He is also an alumnus of the Defence Services Staff College, Wellington, the Army War College, Mhow and the National Defence College, New Delhi.

== Military career ==
The general officer was commissioned into the Kumaon Regiment on 16 December 1989 from the Indian Military Academy. In a career spanning over three decades, he has undertaken numerous command, staff and instructional appointments. He has vast experience in conventional as well as counter terrorist operations and has served as a company commander in Rashtriya Rifles in Jammu & Kashmir and with his battalion in insurgency in the northeast. He has commanded an infantry battalion in western sector, an independent brigade in northern sector and was General Officer Commanding (GOC) of 56th Infantry Division. His staff appointments include serving as GSO-1 in Military Operation Directorate, Staff Officer to Military Secretary , Colonel General Staff at 25 Infantry Division, Deputy Assistant Chief of Integrated Defence Staff (Operations) at the Integrated Defence Staff, Brigadier Military Operations at the Military Operations Directorate and MG GS at Northern Command. He also served with the United Nations Missions in Lebanon as a staff officer. He has done instructional tenures as an instructor at Infantry School, Mhow and at the Defence Services Staff College, Wellington.

After being promoted to the rank of Lieutenant General, on 15 June 2023 he took over as the General Officer Commanding XV Corps. A year and a half later on 25 October 2024, he assumed the appointment of Director General of Military Operations. As DGMO, he spearheaded the Indian Army's planning & execution of Operation Sindoor. After his stint as DGMO, on 10 June 2025, Lieutenant General Rajiv Ghai took over as the Deputy Chief of Army Staff (Strategy). He was appointed as the Military Adviser to the National Security Council Secretariat on 12 June 2026.

== Awards and decorations ==
The general officer has been awarded with the Sarvottam Yudh Seva Medal on Independence Day 2025 for his role during Operation Sindoor, the Uttam Yudh Seva Medal on Republic Day 2025, the Ati Vishisht Seva Medal in 2023, the Sena Medal in 2010, bar to Sena Medal in 2017 and a second bar to Sena Medal in 2021.

Sarvottam Yudh Seva Medal	Uttam Yudh Seva Medal	Ati Vishisht Seva Medal	Sena Medal & Two Bars
Samanya Seva Medal	Special Service Medal	Operation Parakram Medal	Sainya Seva Medal
High Altitude Medal	Videsh Seva Medal	75th Independence Anniversary Medal	50th Independence Anniversary Medal
30 Years Long Service Medal	20 Years Long Service Medal	9 Years Long Service Medal	UNIFIL
