= Tarun Kumar Aich =

Indian Army officer (born 1964)

Lieutenant General Tarun Kumar Aich PVSM AVSM
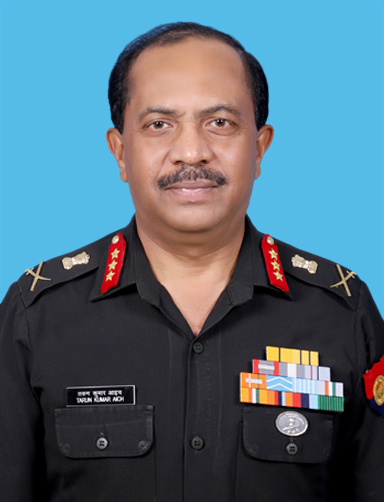
- Tarun Kumar Aich with Lieutenant General Insignia

Deputy Chief of the Army Staff (Strategy)
- In office 14 March 2023 – 31 October 2024
- Chief of the Army Staff: Manoj Pande; Upendra Dwivedi
- Preceded by: M. V. Suchindra Kumar
- Succeeded by: Pratik Sharma

General Officer Commanding XXXIII Corps
- In office 22 October 2021 – 31 October 2022
- Preceded by: Ajai Kumar Singh
- Succeeded by: VPS Kaushik

Personal details
- Born: 19 October 1964 (age 61)

Military service
- Allegiance: India
- Branch/service: Indian Army
- Years of service: 14 June 1986 – 31 October 2024
- Rank: Lieutenant General
- Unit: 16 Madras Regiment
- Commands: XXXIII Corps; 12th Infantry Division (RAPID)
- Service number: IC-43710L
- Awards: Param Vishisht Seva Medal; Ati Vishisht Seva Medal

Tarun Kumar Aich (born 19 October 1964) is a retired General Officer of the Indian Army. He last served as the 4th Deputy Chief of the Army Staff (Strategy). He is the first officer from the Madras Regiment to become the Deputy Chief of Army Staff DCOAS (Strategy), assuming office from Lt Gen M. V. Suchindra Kumar on 14 March 2023. Previously, he was the Director General of Military Intelligence. Prior to that, he was GOC Trishakti Corps (XXXIII Corps). He earlier served as the Director General of National Cadet Corps.

== Early life and education ==
He has completed his schooling from The Frank Anthony Public School, Delhi and High school from Delhi Public School, Delhi. He is an alumnus of the National Defence Academy, Khadakwasla where he graduated with the Degree of Bachelor of Arts and the Indian Military Academy, Dehradun. He is also an alumnus of the Defence Services Staff College, Wellington and Army War College, Mhow. He had undergone the Command and General Staff Course (CGSC) at Hamburg, Germany. He is a Postgraduate and holds an MPhil in Defence and Strategic Studies from the Madras University.

== Military career ==
He was commissioned into 16th battalion of the Madras Regiment (Travancore) in June 1986 from the Indian Military Academy. He has commanded his battalion in the Siachen Glacier and in the intense counter terrorism environment of the Valley Sector in Kashmir. He has held the appointment of the Brigade Major of a Brigade in Counter Insurgency Operations (CI Ops) and General Staff Officer-1 in the Military Intelligence Directorate. He has assumed command as the Colonel (General Staff) of a forward assault formation in the plains sector, served as Colonel General Staff (Planning) at Command Headquarters, and held the esteemed post of Brigadier General Staff at the prestigious Indian Military Academy, Commandant of the High Altitude Warfare School at Gulmarg. He also commanded the 12 Reorganized Army Plains Infantry Division (RAPID) in the desert sector.

On being promoted to the rank of Lieutenant general, he took over as the 33rd Director General of National Cadet Corps on 1 January 2021.

On 22 October 2021, he took over as the GOC XXXIII Corps succeeding Lieutenant General Ajai Kumar Singh. On 11 December 2021, he set up a 400 litres of oxygen per minute oxygen generation plant, at the base hospital in Bengdubi near Bagdogra in Siliguri On 16 May 2022, Lt Gen Tarun Kumar Aich, the GOC of Trishakti Corps, and Avinash Khare, the VC of Sikkim University signed the MoU for the Eastern Command Tibetology cadre course (ECTCC). On 20 September 2022, he inaugurated The Avalanche Monitoring Radar (TAMR) operational in North Sikkim. It is first of its kind radar in India installed jointly by the Indian Army and Defence Geoinformatics and Research Establishment (DGRE) located at an altitude of 15,000 feet. After relinquishing the command of Trishakti Corps, he moved to the Army headquarters and assumed the appointment of Director General Military Intelligence.

On 14 March 2023, he assumed the appointment as the 4th and the current Deputy Chief of the Army Staff (Strategy) succeeding Lt Gen M. V. Suchindra Kumar. He supernatuated on 31 October 2024.

== Awards and decorations ==
He has been awarded the Param Vishisht Seva Medal in 2024 and the Ati Vishisht Seva Medal in 2021. The general officer has been awarded the Chief of Army Staff's Commendation thrice.

Param Vishisht Seva Medal		Ati Vishisht Seva Medal	
Special Service Medal	Siachen Glacier Medal		Operation Vijay Medal
Sainya Seva Medal	High Altitude Medal	Videsh Seva Medal	75th Independence Anniversary Medal
50th Independence Anniversary Medal	30 Years Long Service Medal	20 Years Long Service Medal	9 Years Long Service Medal

== Dates of rank ==
Insignia	Rank	Component	Date of rank
	Second Lieutenant	Indian Army	14 June 1986
	Lieutenant	Indian Army	14 June 1988
	Captain	Indian Army	14 June 1991
	Major	Indian Army	14 June 1997
	Lieutenant Colonel	Indian Army	16 December 2004
	Colonel	Indian Army	1 May 2007
	Brigadier	Indian Army	14 December 2012 (acting) 1 April 2013 (substantive, with seniority from 10 June 2011)
	Major General	Indian Army	1 October 2018 (seniority from 1 February 2017)
	Lieutenant General	Indian Army	1 January 2021

== Gallery ==
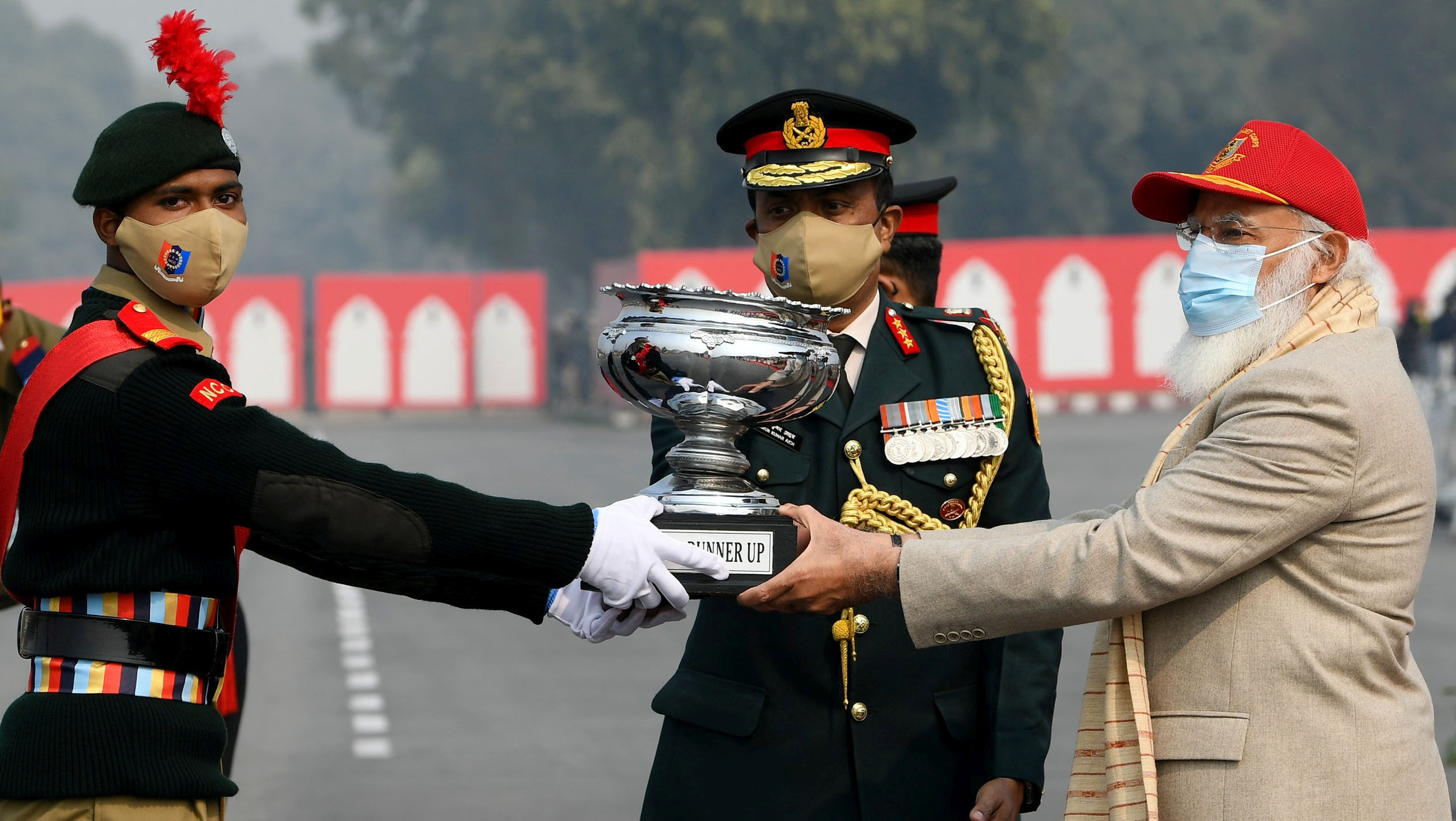
The Prime Minister, Shri Narendra Modi presenting the trophy to the winners, at the National Cadet Corps (NCC) Rally, in New Delhi. The DG, NCC, Lieutenant General Tarun Kumar Aich is also seen, January 28, 2021.

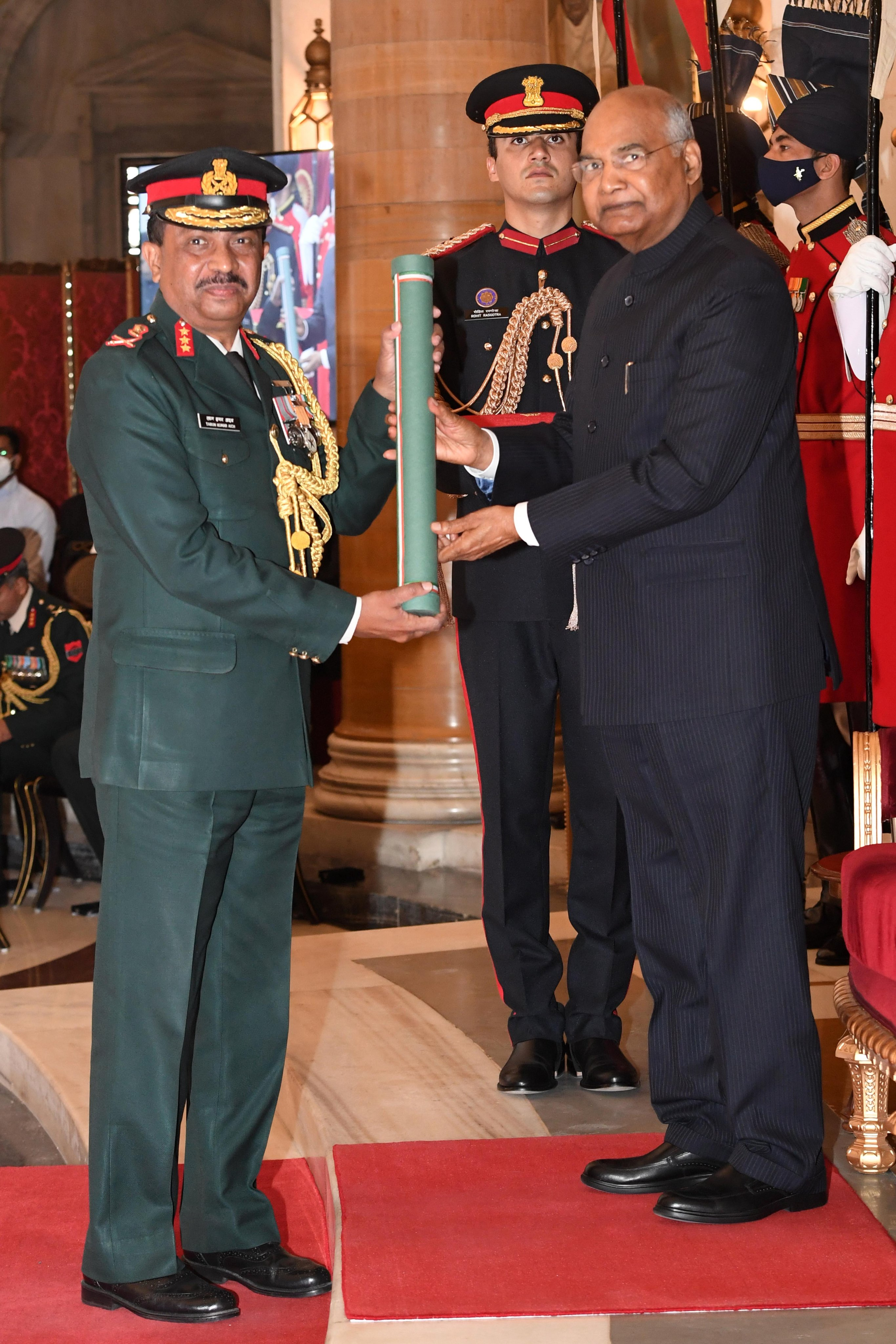
President Kovind presents Ati Vishisht Seva Medal to Lt. General Tarun Kumar Aich, The Infantry. November 23, 2021.
