= M. V. Suchindra Kumar =

Indian Army General

Lieutenant General M. V. Suchindra Kumar PVSM AVSM YSM** VSM
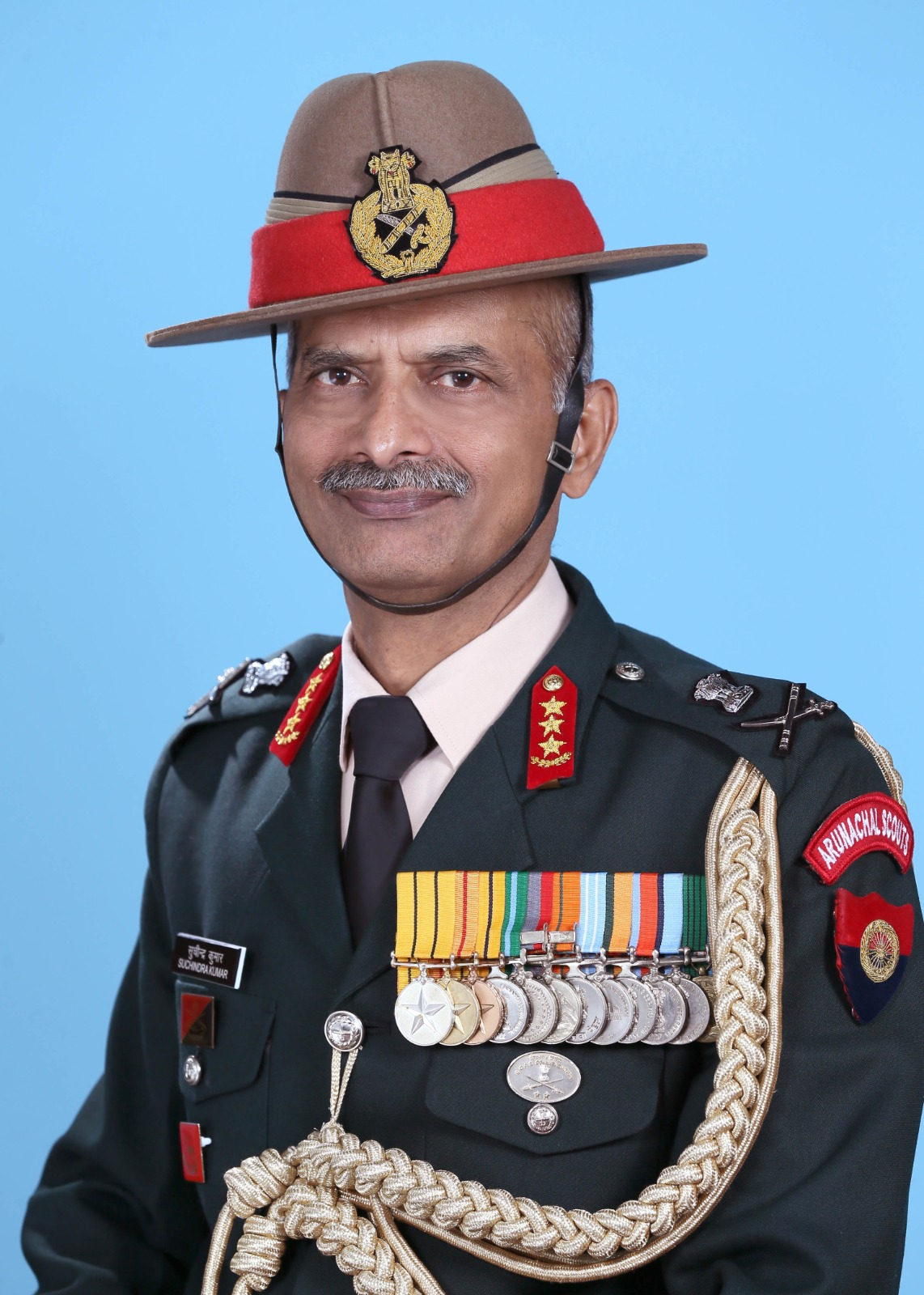

General Officer Commanding-in-Chief Northern Command
- In office 19 February 2024 – 30 April 2025
- Chief of Army Staff: Manoj Pande; Upendra Dwivedi
- Preceded by: Upendra Dwivedi
- Succeeded by: Pratik Sharma

45th Vice Chief of the Army Staff
- In office 1 March 2023 – 18 February 2024
- President: Droupadi Murmu
- Chief of Army Staff: Manoj Pande
- Preceded by: B. S. Raju
- Succeeded by: Upendra Dwivedi

Personal details
- Spouse: Asha Suchindra
- Education: Indian Military Academy

Military service
- Allegiance: India
- Branch/service: Indian Army
- Years of service: 8 June 1985 – 30 April 2025
- Rank: Lieutenant General
- Unit: 1 Assam Regiment
- Commands: Northern Command; XVI Corps; 120 Infantry Brigade; 59 Rashtriya Rifles (Assam)
- Service number: IC-42794X
- Awards: Param Vishisht Seva Medal; Ati Vishisht Seva Medal; Bar to Yudh Seva Medal; Yudh Seva Medal; Vishisht Seva Medal

Lieutenant General M. V. Suchindra Kumar, PVSM, AVSM, YSM**, VSM is a retired general officer of the Indian Army. He last served as the General Officer Commanding-in-Chief Northern Command. He previously served as the 45th Vice Chief of the Army Staff, prior to that he was Deputy Chief of the Army Staff (Strategy). He also served as the Director General Military Intelligence and as the General Officer Commanding XVI Corps. He is also the Colonel of the Assam Regiment & the Arunachal Scouts.

== Early life and education ==
He was born in a Lingayat family completed his schooling from the Sainik School, Bijapur. He then attended the National Defence Academy and the Indian Military Academy. He also attended the Defence Services Staff College, Wellington, Higher Command Course, Mhow and the National Defence College, New Delhi. He has also attended courses on Cooperative Security in South Asia in Sri Lanka and United Nations Senior Mission Leaders Course in Egypt.

== Military career ==
The general officer was commissioned into the 1st battalion, The Assam Regiment (1 ASSAM) in June 1985. He attended the Defence Services Staff College, Wellington. He served as an instructor at the Infantry School, Mhow. As part of the United Nations, he served as the Sector Senior Operations Officer in the Transitional Authority in Cambodia and in the Indian Army Training team in Lesotho. At Army headquarters, he served in the Military Secretary Branch. He commanded the 59 battalion, The Rashtriya Rifles (Assam). The RR battalions are deployed in a counter-insurgency role in Jammu and Kashmir.

Promoted to the rank of Brigadier, he commanded the 120 Infantry Brigade. For this stint, he was awarded the Yudh Seva Medal on 26 January 2014. He was then selected to attend the National Defence College in New Delhi, as part of the 54th course. After completing the course, he was appointed Brigadier General Staff (BGS) of a corps in the Eastern theatre. On 26 January 2018, he was awarded the Vishisht Seva Medal.

=== General officer ===
He was promoted to the rank of Major General and appointed General officer commanding of an infantry division on the line of control. In the 2019 Republic Day honours, he was awarded a bar to the Yudh Seva Medal. He subsequently served in the Military Intelligence directorate as the Additional Director General Military Intelligence (ADGMI). On 28 January 2020, he was promoted to the rank of Lieutenant General and was appointed the General Officer Commanding of XVI Corps succeeding Lieutenant General Harsha Gupta. For his tenure as GOC XVI Corps, he was awarded the Ati Vishisht Seva Medal on 26 January 2022. After a year-long stint, he moved to Army HQ as the Director General Military Intelligence (DGMI). After a short stint as DGMI, on 1 July 2022 he assumed the appointment of Deputy Chief of Army Staff (Strategy).

On 1 March 2023, Lieutenant General M. V. Suchindra Kumar took over as the 45th Vice Chief of the Army Staff succeeding Lieutenant General B. S. Raju who moved to South Western Command as Army Commander. On 19 February 2024, he took over as the General Officer Commanding-in-Chief of the Northern Command succeeding General (then Lieutenant General) Upendra Dwivedi who moved to the Army Headquarters as the Vice Chief of the Army Staff.

On 30 April 2025, Lt Gen Pratik Sharma replaced General Kumar as the General Officer Commanding-in Chief of the Northern Command, Kumar having reached the superannuation age.

== Personal life ==
He is married to Asha Suchindra, an educationalist. The couple has two children. Gen Kumar is an amateur half marathon runner, golf enthusiast and yoga practitioner. An avid reader, his military papers have been published in a number of professional journals.

== Awards and decorations ==
The General officer was awarded the Yudh Seva Medal in 2014, the Vishisht Seva Medal in 2018, a bar to the Yudh Seva Medal in 2019, the Ati Vishisht Seva Medal in 2022 and the Param Vishisht Seva Medal in 2024.

	Param Vishisht Seva Medal	Ati Vishisht Seva Medal	
Yudh Seva Medal (Bar)	Vishisht Seva Medal	Samanya Seva Medal	Special Service Medal
Sainya Seva Medal	Videsh Seva Medal	75th Independence Anniversary Medal	50th Independence Anniversary Medal
30 Years Long Service Medal	20 Years Long Service Medal	9 Years Long Service Medal	UNTAC Medal

== Dates of rank ==
Insignia	Rank	Component	Date of rank
	Second Lieutenant	Indian Army	8 June 1985
	Lieutenant	Indian Army	8 June 1987
	Captain	Indian Army	8 June 1990
	Major	Indian Army	8 June 1996
	Lieutenant Colonel	Indian Army	16 December 2004
	Colonel	Indian Army	15 August 2006
	Brigadier	Indian Army	25 February 2012 (acting); 28 April 2012 (substantive, with seniority from 9 October 2010)
	Major General	Indian Army	1 September 2017 (seniority from 1 June 2015)
	Lieutenant General	Indian Army	28 January 2020

Military offices
Preceded by Upendra Dwivedi	General Officer Commanding-in-Chief Northern Command; 19 February 2022 - present	Succeeded by Pratik Sharma
Preceded by B. S. Raju	Vice Chief of the Army Staff; 1 March 2023 – 18 February 2024	Succeeded by Upendra Dwivedi
Preceded by Sanjeev Kumar Sharma	Deputy Chief of the Army Staff (Strategy); 1 July 2022 – 28 February 2023	Succeeded by Tarun Kumar Aich
Preceded by Harsha Gupta	General Officer Commanding XVI Corps; 14 October 2020 – 28 October 2021	Succeeded by Manjinder Singh
