= Director General of Military Operations (India) =

Senior officer in the Indian army

- Incumbent; Lieutenant General Abhijit S. Pendharkar since June 2026
- Indian Army
- Abbreviation: DGMO
- Reports to: Deputy Chief of the Army Staff (Strategy)
- Seat: Army Headquarters, New Delhi
- Term length: No fixed term
- Precursor: Director of Military Operations (DMO)
- Formation: 1947
- First holder: Pran Nath Thapar
- Deputy: Additional Director General Military Operations (ADGMO)

The Director General of Military Operations (DGMO) is a senior officer of the Indian Army, based at Army Headquarters. The DGMO is a three-star officer of the rank of Lieutenant general who oversees all military operations of the Indian Army.

The DGMO plans, coordinates and supervises military operations and serves as the Army's operational point of contact with foreign militaries. The DGMO also acts as a liaison between the different branches of the armed forces for joint operations. DGMOs also serve as the primary officers who prevent escalation during times of conflict with other countries as point of contacts. During major Indo-Pakistan conflicts, DGMOs have served a major role of communication and de-escalation.

== History ==
After the Independence of India, on 15 August 1947, Brigadier Pran Nath Thapar was appointed the Director of Military Operations & Intelligence (DGMO&I). In 1948, after Brigadier J. N. Chaudhuri demitted office, the appointment was divided into Director of Operations (DMO) and Director of Intelligence (DMI). Brigadier Sam Manekshaw took over as the DMO. The appointment was upgraded to two-star rank in the late 1960s. It was further upgraded to three-star rank in the 1980s and re-designated Director General of Military Operations (DGMO).

== List of officeholders ==
=== Director of Military Operations & Intelligence ===
| Rank | Name | Photo | Assumed office | Left office | Operations | References |
|---|---|---|---|---|---|---|
| Brigadier | Pran Nath Thapar | | 15 August 1947 | November 1947 | Partition of India | |
| Brigadier | Jayanto Nath Chaudhuri | | November 1947 | May 1948 | India–Pakistan war of 1947–1948 | |

=== Director of Military Operations ===
| Rank | Name | Photo | Assumed office | Left office | Operations | References |
|---|---|---|---|---|---|---|
| Brigadier | Sam Manekshaw | | May 1948 | April 1954 | | |
| Brigadier | Gopal Gurunath Bewoor | | | | | |
| Brigadier | D. C. Noronha | | | 1961 | | |
| Brigadier | D. K. Palit | | 1961 | 1964 | Sino-Indian War | |
| Brigadier | N. C. Rawlley | | 1964 | May 1965 | | |
| Brigadier | Narinder Singh | | May 1965 | | India–Pakistan war of 1965 | |
| Major General | Khem Karan Singh | | | October 1971 | | |
| Major General | Inderjit Singh Gill | | October 1971 | | Indo-Pakistani war of 1971 | |
| Major General | Zorawar Chand Bakhshi | | October 1973 | September 1974 | | |
| Major General | Arun Shridhar Vaidya | | October 1974 | | | |
| Major General | Manohar Lal Chibber | | | | | |

=== Director General of Military Operations ===
| Rank | Name | Photo | Assumed office | Left office | Operations | References |
|---|---|---|---|---|---|---|
| Lieutenant General | C. N. Somanna | | | January 1985 | Operation Blue Star | |
| Lieutenant General | Prem Nath Hoon | | May 1985 | May 1986 | | |
| Lieutenant General | R. N. Mahajan | | June 1986 | | | |
| Lieutenant General | Bipin Chandra Joshi | | 1986 | April 1989 | | |
| Lieutenant General | V. K. Singh | | | | | |
| Lieutenant General | Satish Nambiar | | | March 1992 | | |
| Lieutenant General | Vivek Oberoi | | | | | |
| Lieutenant General | V. R. Raghavan | | | 1994 | | |
| Lieutenant General | Nirmal Chander Vij | | 15 February 1999 | 1 October 2000 | Kargil War | |
| Lieutenant General | Gurbaksh Singh Sihota | | | 9 October 2001 | | |
| Lieutenant General | Sarvjit Singh Chahal | | 9 October 2001 | | Operation Parakram | |
| Lieutenant General | Balraj Singh Takhar | | | 1 March 2004 | | |
| Lieutenant General | A S Bahia | | 01 March 2004 | 01 February 2005 | | |
| Lieutenant General | Madan Gopal | | | 1 July 2006 | | |
| Lieutenant General | Mohan Pande | | 1 July 2006 | 2008 | | |
| Lieutenant General | Chandra Shekhar | | | | | |
| Lieutenant General | A. S. Sekhon | | | | | |
| Lieutenant General | Anand Mohan Verma | | May 2011 | 9 January 2012 | | |
| Lieutenant General | A. K. Choudhary | | 9 January 2012 | 1 October 2012 | | |
| Lieutenant General | Vinod Bhatia | | 1 October 2012 | 28 February 2014 | 2013 North India floods | |
| Lieutenant General | P. R. Kumar | | 28 February 2014 | November 2015 | 2015 Indian counter-insurgency operation in Myanmar | |
| Lieutenant General | Ranbir Singh | | November 2015 | November 2016 | 2016 Indian Line of Control strike | |
| Lieutenant General | Anil Kumar Bhatt | | November 2016 | 30 January 2018 | | |
| Lieutenant General | Anil Chauhan | | 30 January 2018 | 15 October 2019 | 2019 India–Pakistan border skirmishes | |
| Lieutenant General | Paramjit Singh | | 15 October 2019 | April 2021 | Operation Snow Leopard | |
| Lieutenant General | B. S. Raju | | April 2021 | 30 April 2022 | | |
| Lieutenant General | Manoj Kumar Katiyar | | 1 May 2022 | 30 June 2023 | | |
| Lieutenant General | Pratik Sharma | | 1 July 2023 | 25 October 2024 | | |
| Lieutenant General | Rajiv Ghai | | 25 October 2024 | September 2025 | Operation Sindoor | |
| Lieutenant General | Manish Luthra | | September 2025 | June 2026 | | |
| Lieutenant General | Abhijit S. Pendharkar | | June 2026 | Incumbent | | |

== See also ==
- Director General Naval Operations
- Director General Air Operations

== Bibliography ==
- Singh, Vijay Kumar (2005). Leadership in the Indian Army: Biographies of Twelve Soldiers. SAGE Publications. ISBN 978-0-7619-3322-9.
