= Upendra Dwivedi =

30th Chief of the Army Staff (India)

General Upendra Dwivedi PVSM AVSM
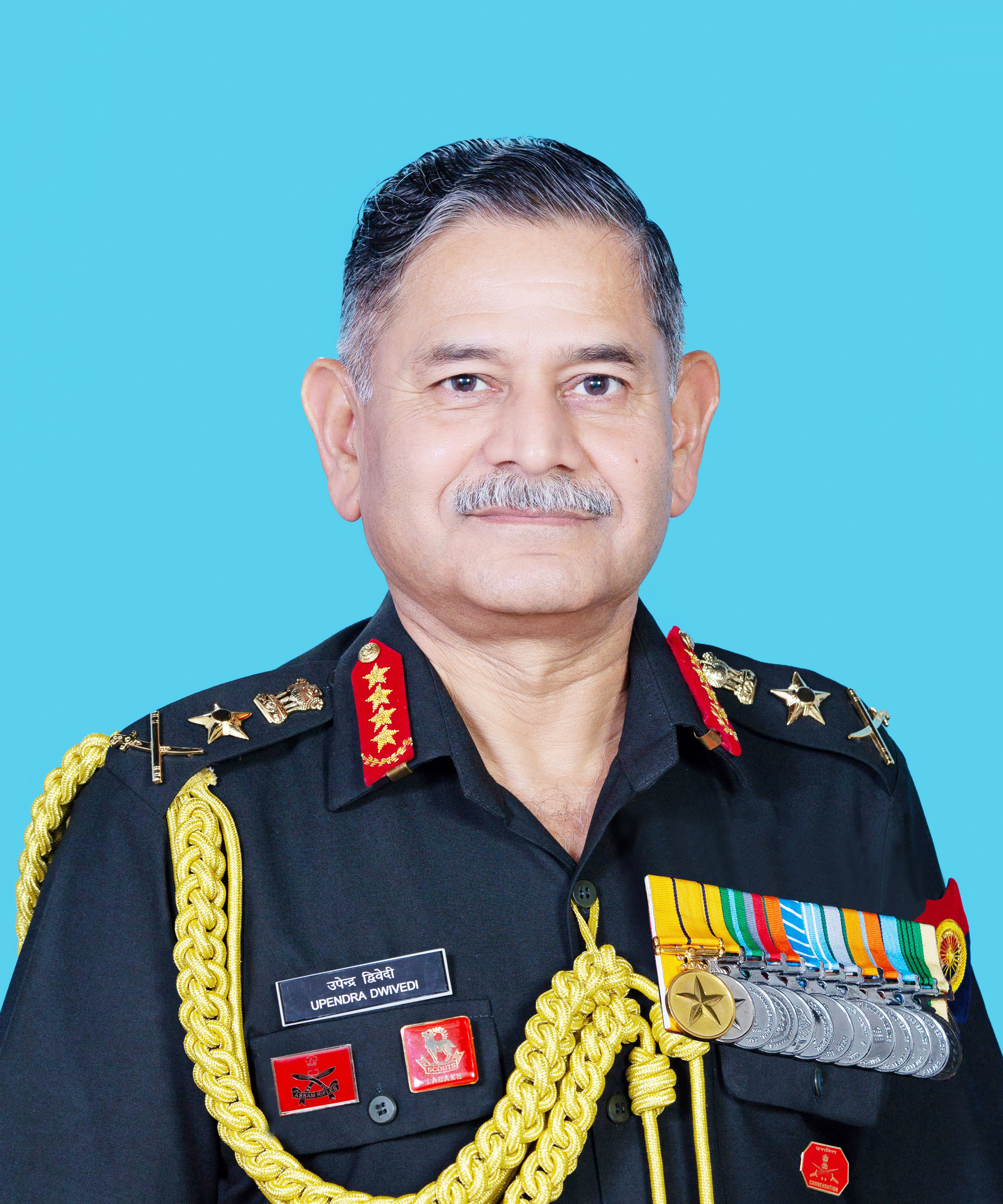
- Official Portrait, 2024

30th Chief of the Army Staff
- In office 30 June 2024 – 30 June 2026
- President: Droupadi Murmu
- Preceded by: Manoj Pande
- Succeeded by: Dhiraj Seth

46th Vice Chief of the Army Staff
- In office 19 February 2024 – 30 June 2024
- President: Droupadi Murmu
- Chief of Army Staff: Manoj Pande
- Preceded by: M. V. Suchindra Kumar
- Succeeded by: N. S. Raja Subramani

General Officer Commanding-in-Chief Northern Command
- In office 1 February 2022 – 18 February 2024
- Chief of Army Staff: Manoj Mukund Naravane; Manoj Pande
- Preceded by: Yogesh Kumar Joshi
- Succeeded by: M. V. Suchindra Kumar

Personal details
- Born: 1 July 1964 (age 62)
- Spouse: Sunita Dwivedi
- Education: Sainik School, Rewa; National Defence Academy; Indian Military Academy; USAWC

Military service
- Allegiance: India
- Branch/service: Indian Army
- Years of service: 15 December 1984 – 30 June 2026
- Rank: General
- Unit: 18 JAK RIF
- Commands: Northern Command; IX Corps; IGAR (East); 26 Sector AR; 18 JAK RIF
- Service number: IC-42298W
- Awards: Param Vishisht Seva Medal; Ati Vishisht Seva Medal

General Upendra Dwivedi PVSM AVSM (born 1 July 1964) is a retired general officer of the Indian Army. He last served as the 30th Chief of the Army Staff. He earlier served as the 46th Vice Chief of Army Staff, General Officer Commanding-in-Chief Northern Command,Deputy Chief of the Army Staff (Information Systems and Coordination) and as the General Officer Commanding IX Corps.

== Early life and education ==
Gen Dwivedi is an alumnus of Sainik School, Rewa. He joined Sainik School, Rewa in July 1973 where he was classmates with former Chief of Naval Staff Admiral Dinesh Kumar Tripathi and passed out from the school in 1981. He attended the National Defence Academy, Khadakwasla and then the Indian Military Academy, Dehradun. He was conferred Distinguished Fellow in the coveted NDC equivalent course at the United States Army War College in Carlisle, USA. He has an M.Phil. degree in Defence & Management Studies, in addition to the two master's degrees in Strategic Studies and Military Science, including one from United States Army War College. He has authored / presented articles in various professional forums / Journals.

== Military career ==
He was commissioned into the 18th battalion of the Jammu and Kashmir Rifles on 15 December 1984 from Indian Military Academy, Dehradun. He has commanded a battalion at Chowkibal in Kashmir Valley during Operation Rakshak and the deserts of Rajasthan, a sector of the Assam Rifles in Manipur during Operation Rhino, served in Assam as Inspector General, Assam Rifles and held various other Staff & Command appointments in the North East. He has had a unique distinction of balanced exposure of both Northern and Western Theatres.

During his career spanning over four decades, he has tenanted various staff appointments in Headquarter Armoured Brigade, Mountain Division, Strike Corps and Integrated HQ, MoD (Army). Among his previous appointments were as an instructor at the Indian Military Academy, and Directing Staff at the Higher Command Wing in the Army War College. His two overseas tenures include Somalia, as part of HQ UNOSOM II and Military attaché to the Government of Seychelles. He has been IGAR (East) and Sector Cdr Assam Rifles in intense CT Ops and held various other Staff & Command appointments in the North East where he pioneered the first ever compendium on Indo – Myanmar Border Management. Later as Director General Infantry he steered and fast-tracked Capital procurement cases of weapons for all three services.

In February 2020, Gen Dwivedi was appointed commander of IX Corps. A year later in April 2021, he took over as the Deputy Chief of the Army Staff (Information Systems and Coordination). As DCOAS (IS&C), the officer gave impetus to automation and absorption of niche tech in the Indian Army.

On 1 February 2022, Lieutenant General Upendra Dwivedi took over as the General Officer Commanding in Chief, Northern Command, he assumed the post upon superannuation of Lieutenant General Yogesh Kumar Joshi. Gen Dwivedi being a technology enthusiast, he worked towards enhancing the tech-threshold of all ranks in Northern Command and pushed for critical & emerging Technologies like big data analytics, artificial Intelligence, quantum and blockchain based solutions. He was also involved in modernisation and equipping of the largest Army Command of Indian Army, where he steered the induction of Indigenous equipment as part of Atmanirbhar Bharat. He synergised with people of Jammu, Kashmir and Ladakh for convergent nation building outcomes and infrastructure development.

On 19 February 2024, Lieutenant General Upendra Dwivedi took over as the 46th Vice Chief of Army Staff from Lieutenant General M. V. Suchindra Kumar, who was appointed the General Officer Commanding-in-Chief, Northern Command.

=== Chief of the Army Staff ===
On 11 June 2024, the Government of India appointed Lieutenant General Upendra Dwivedi as the next Chief of Army Staff. On 30 June 2024, General Upendra Dwivedi took over as the 30th Chief of the Army Staff succeeding General Manoj Pande on the latter's superannuation after four decades of service. After becoming Chief of the Army Staff he played a vital role during victory in Operation Sindoor. He was succeeded by General Dhiraj Seth who took over as the 31st Chief of the Army Staff.

== Personal life ==
The General Officer is married to Mrs. Sunita Dwivedi, a science graduate, who is a homemaker. Mrs. Sunita Dwivedi has been associated with Aarushi, an Institute for specially abled children, at Bhopal. The couple has two daughters who are working with NGOs. General Dwivedi is a skilled Yoga practitioner.

== Awards and decorations ==
The general officer was awarded the Param Vishisht Seva Medal in 2024 and the Ati Vishisht Seva Medal in 2021. Gen. Dwivedi has been awarded three GOC-in-C Commendation cards.

Param Vishisht Seva Medal		Ati Vishisht Seva Medal	
Samanya Seva Medal	Special Service Medal		Sainya Seva Medal
High Altitude Medal	Videsh Seva Medal	75th Independence Anniversary Medal	50th Independence Anniversary Medal
30 Years Long Service Medal	20 Years Long Service Medal	9 Years Long Service Medal	UNOSOM

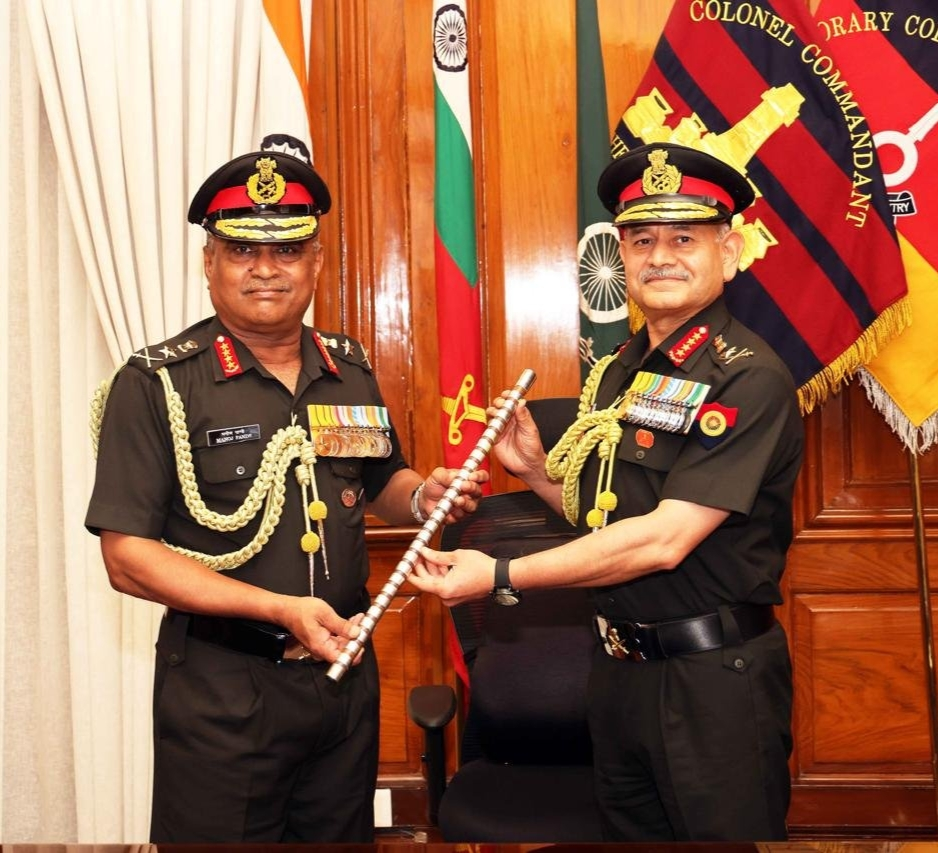
Gen Manoj Pande hands over the baton to Gen Upendra Dwivedi

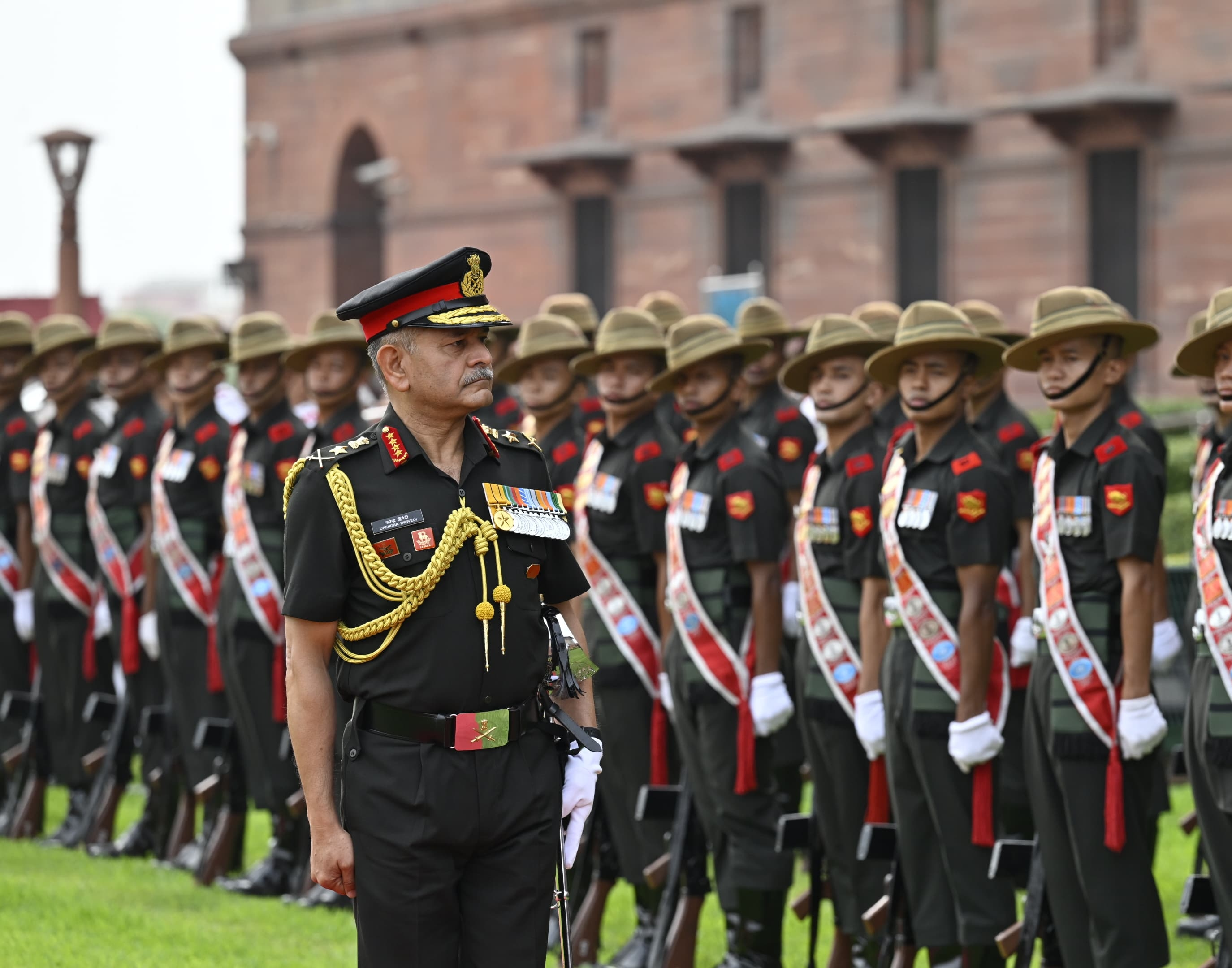
General Upendra Dwivedi receiving a guard of honour after assuming charge as 30th Chief of the Army Staff

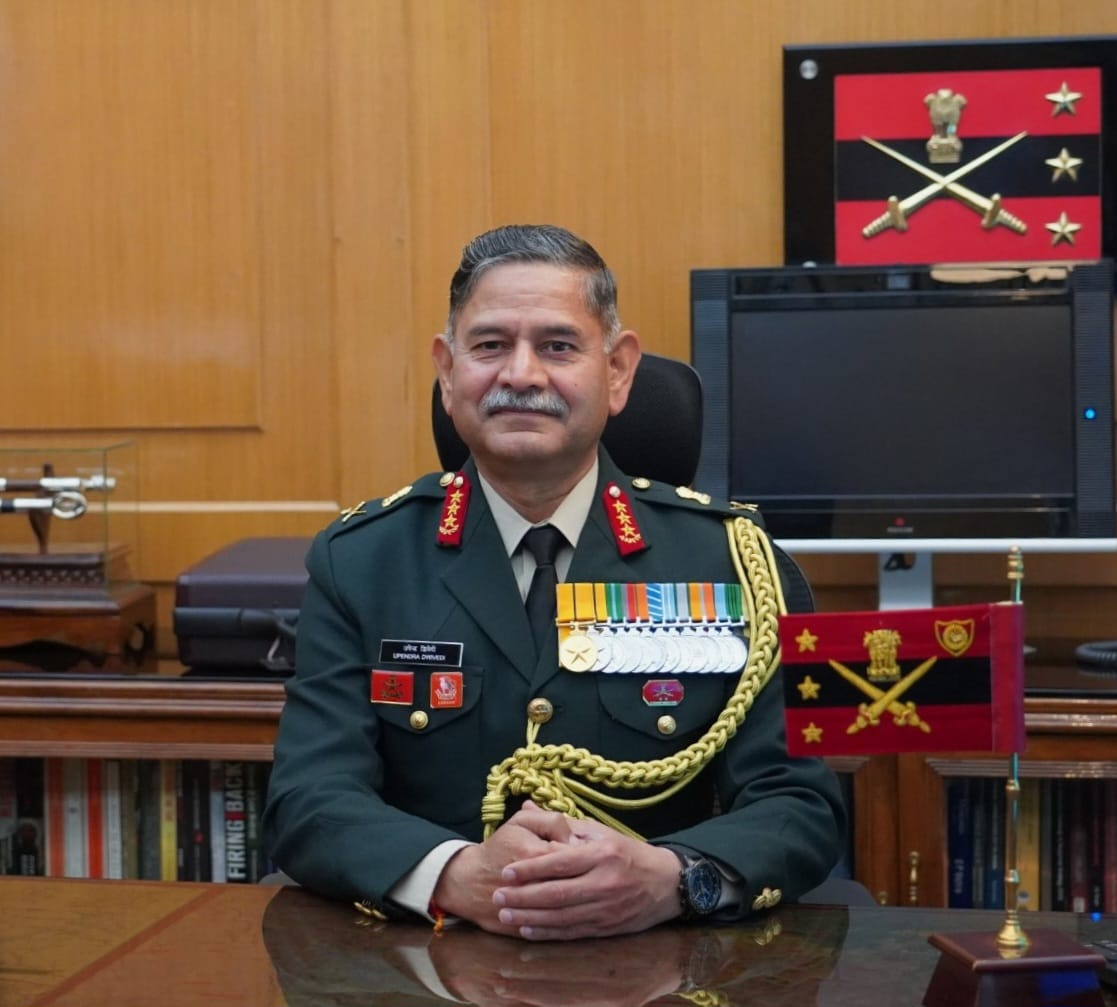
Gen Dwivedi as VCOAS

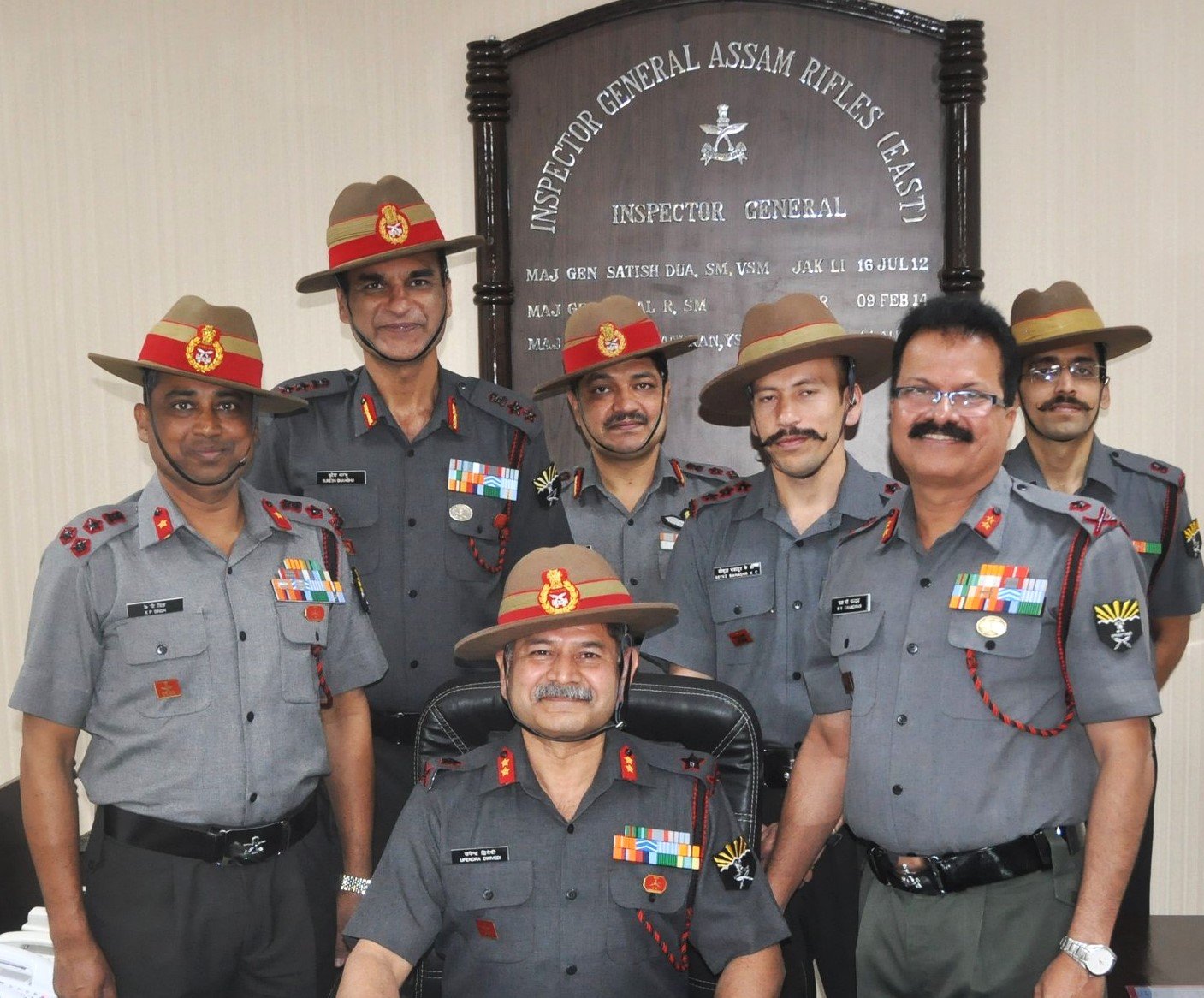
Gen Dwivedi as IGAR (East)

== Dates of rank ==
Insignia	Rank	Component	Date of rank
	Second Lieutenant	Indian Army	15 December 1984
	Lieutenant	Indian Army	15 December 1986
	Captain	Indian Army	15 December 1989
	Major	Indian Army	15 December 1995
	Lieutenant Colonel	Indian Army	16 December 2004
	Colonel	Indian Army	1 April 2006
	Brigadier	Indian Army	13 June 2011 (acting); 17 October 2011 (substantive, with seniority from 30 March 2010)
	Major General	Indian Army	1 December 2016 (seniority from 1 February 2015)
	Lieutenant General	Indian Army	15 July 2019
	General (COAS)	Indian Army	30 June 2024

Military offices
Preceded by Manoj Pande	Chief of the Army Staff; 30 June 2024 – 30 June 2026	Succeeded by Dhiraj Seth
Preceded by M. V. Suchindra Kumar	Vice Chief of the Army Staff; 19 February 2024 – 30 June 2024	Succeeded by N. S. Raja Subramani
Preceded by Yogesh Kumar Joshi	General Officer Commanding-in-Chief Northern Command; 1 February 2022 – 18 February 2024	Succeeded by M. V. Suchindra Kumar
Preceded by Amardeep Singh Bhinder	Deputy Chief of the Army Staff (Information Systems and Coordination); 10 April 2021 – 31 January 2022	Succeeded by Bansi Ponnappa
Preceded by Jai Singh Nain	General Officer Commanding IX Corps; 16 February 2020 – 26 March 2021	Succeeded by P. N. Ananthanarayanan
Preceded by M. V. Chandran	Inspector General Assam Rifles (East); 2017 – 2018	Succeeded by GAV Reddy
