= Vijay Kumar Datta =

Indian military general

Major General Vijay Kumar Datta AVSM SM VSM
- Born: 1950 (age 75–76)
- Military career
- Allegiance: India
- Branch: Indian Army
- Service years: 15 March 1970 – 1 May 2008
- Rank: Major general
- Unit: 1 Gorkha Rifles (The Malaun Regiment)
- Commands: Additional Director General (TA); Offg Corps Commander (21 Corps); Chief of Staff (21 Corps); Division Commander (25 Inf Div); DDG MO (Special Ops); Brigade Commander (181 Mtn Bde); Col Q Ops (Northern Command); Group Commander (51 SAG)
- Awards: Ati Vishisht Seva Medal; Vishisht Seva Medal; Bar to Vishisht Seva Medal; Sena Medal (Gallantry); Bar to Sena Medal (Gallantry); President's Police Medal for Gallantry; Chief of Army Staff Commendation Card

Major General Vijay Kumar Datta AVSM, SM, VSM, was the additional director general of the Territorial Army of the Indian Army.

== Biography ==
Major General Datta started his career in uniform when he was commissioned in the 2nd Battalion of the 1st Gorkha Rifles in March 1970. He volunteered and served in the first counter-terrorist and counter-hijack unit of the country. A black belt in karate, he introduced this art in the army.

One of Datta's major accomplishments was the designing and introduction of the bullet-proof patka for the army and para-military forces. He also designed and conceptualised the bullet-proof jacket (kavach) which is being produced by DRDO. The credit of designing the arms laser designator goes to him too. He was involved in the raising of the Special Protection Group and the National Security Guard.

He has commanded a mountain brigade in counterinsurgency operations under the Operation Rhino in Assam and an infantry division on the Line of Control in Jammu and Kashmir in Operation Rakshak. He was also posted as the chief of staff of 21 Corps (offensive formation of the Indian Army). He also became additional director general of the Territorial Army before he retired the army on 1 May 2008.
