= Northern Command (India) =

Indian Army regional command

- Insignia of Northern Command
- Active: 1908–1947; 1972 – present
- Country: India
- Branch: Indian Army
- Type: Command
- HQ: Udhampur
- Nickname: Dhruva Command
- Motto: Always in Combat

Commanders
- GOC-in-C: Lt Gen Pratik Sharma, SYSM PVSM AVSM SM
- Notable commanders: Pre Independence: Field Marshal Sir William Birdwood; General Sir Richard O'Connor; General Sir Frank Messervy; General Sir James Willcocks; Post independence: Lieutenant General P. S. Bhagat; General S. Padmanabhan; General Deepak Kapoor; General Upendra Dwivedi

Insignia
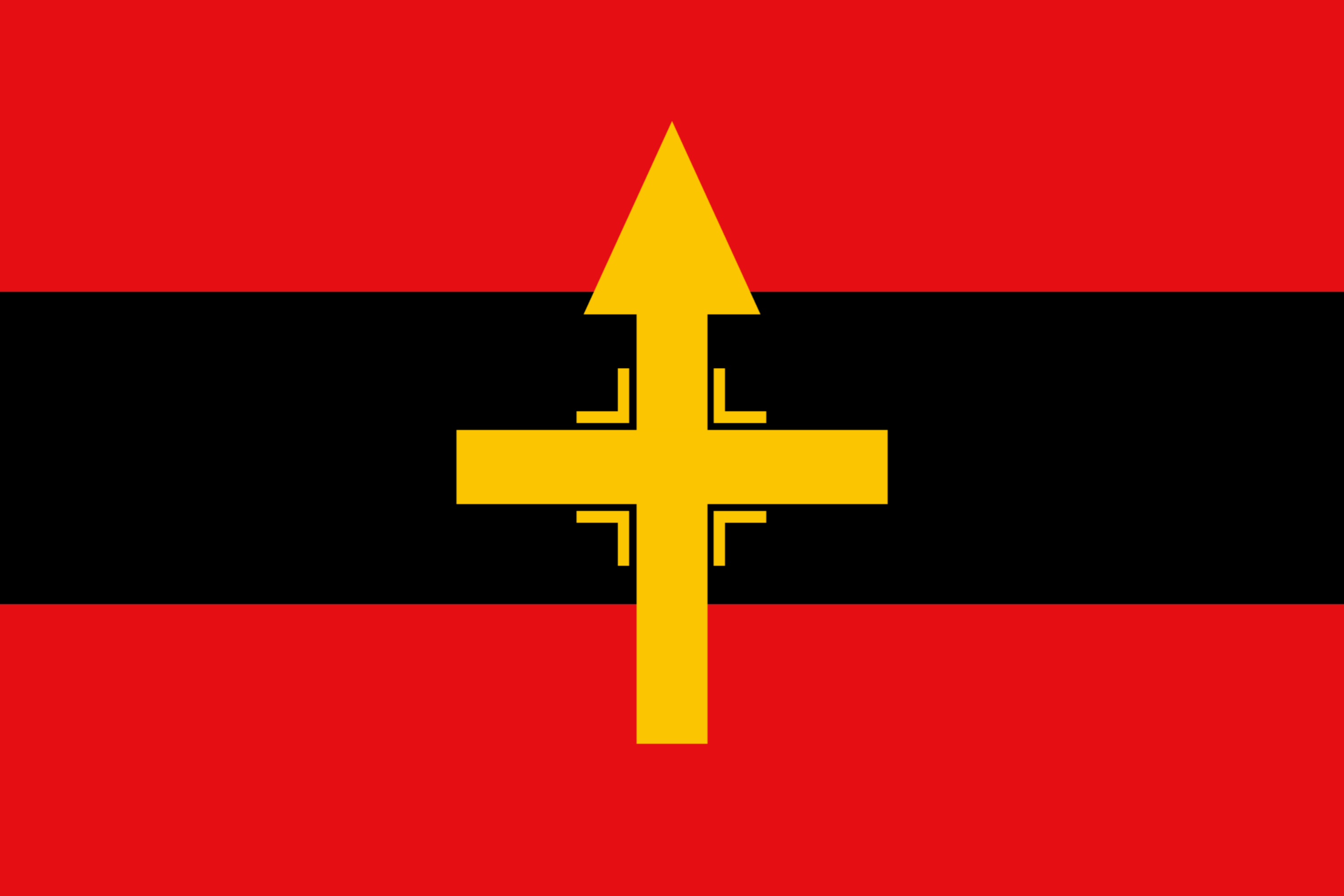
- Flag

The Northern Command is a Command of the Indian Army. It was originally formed as the Northern Army of the British Indian Army in 1908. It was scrapped upon India's independence in 1947 and later re-raised in 1972. Currently, the XIV Corps (Leh), XV Corps (Srinagar), I Corps (Mathura) and XVI Corps (Nagrota) are under its control. Its present commander is Lieutenant General Pratik Sharma.

== History ==
The Presidency armies were abolished with effect from 1 April 1895 when the three Presidency armies became the Indian Army. The Indian Army was divided into four Commands: Bengal Command, Bombay Command, Madras Command and Punjab Command, each under a lieutenant general.

In 1908, the four commands were merged into two Armies: Northern Army and Southern Army. This system persisted until 1920 when the arrangement reverted to four commands again :- Eastern Command, Northern Command, Southern Command and Western Command.

In 1937, Western Command was downgraded to become the Western Independent District. In April 1942, the Western Independent District was absorbed into the Northern Command which itself was re-designated as North Western Army to guard the borders at North West Frontier during World War II. It controlled the Kohat, Peshawar, Rawalpindi, Baluchistan and Waziristan Districts.

The formation reverted to the title Northern Command in November 1945. In 1947, India moved towards partition, with Northern Command HQ at Rawalpindi becoming the Army HQ of the newly formed Pakistan Army (as GHQ Pakistan), with the rest of commands passing to the Indian Army.

In 1972, the Government of India decided to raise a separate command to oversee operations in the northern borders with Pakistan and China. Lt. Gen. P. S. Bhagat was appointed as its GOC-in-C in June 1972. Bhagat's main activities as Army Commander were the improvement of defence and the living and working condition of his troops. Headquarters for the command was established at Udhampur, J&K.

The XIV Corps (Leh), XV Corps (Srinagar) and XVI Corps (Nagrota) control the operational units in Northern Command. 71 Independent Sub Area is part of the Command. In 2001–02, during Operation Parakram the III Corps and its 57th Mountain Division were temporarily shifted into the command as a reserve.

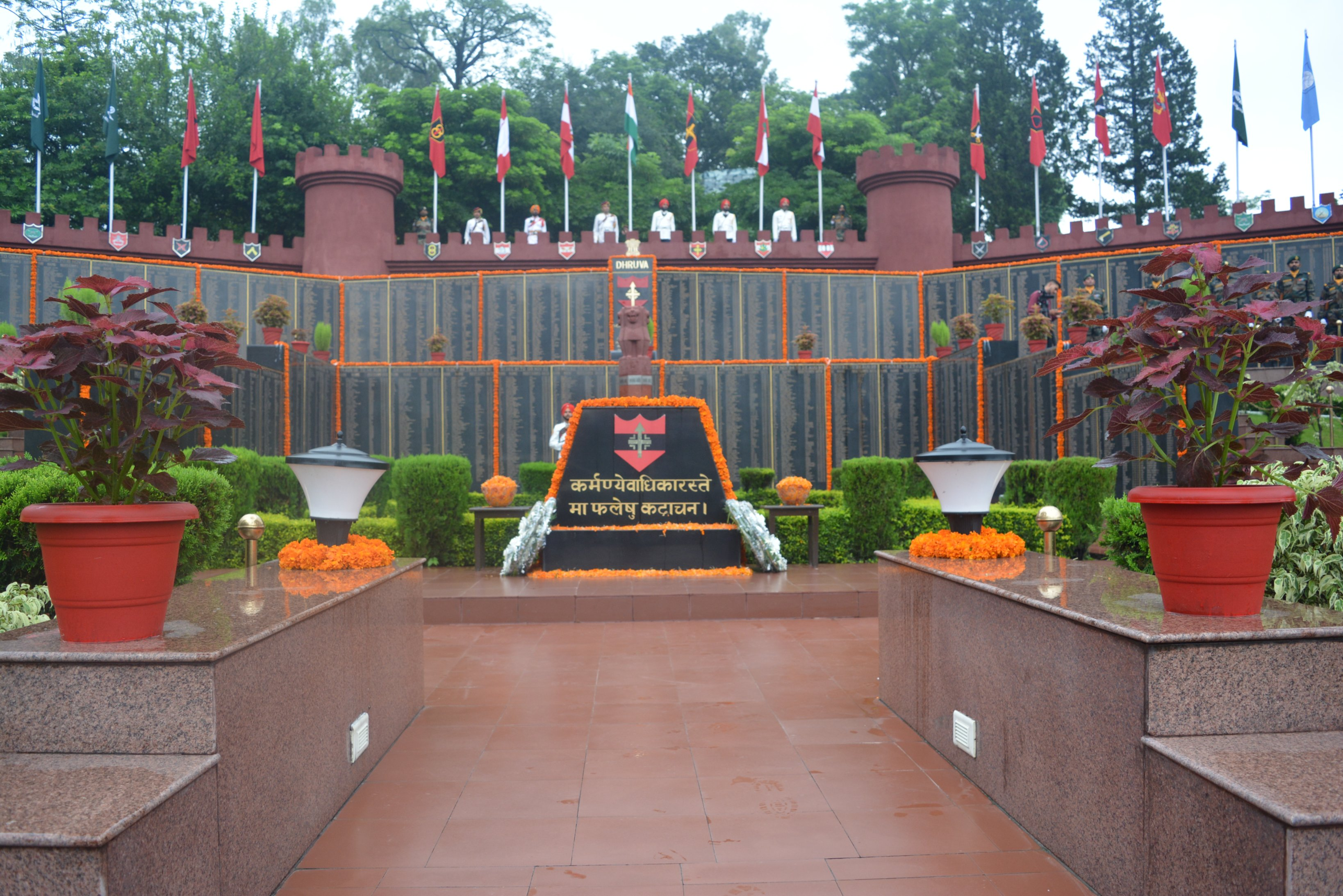
Dhruva War Memorial, Udhampur

On 1 June 2025, the Northern Command became the first Command of the Indian Army to establish the position of Command Subedar Major by appointing Subedar Major Ojit Singh from 3 Assam Regiment in-charge of the office. The appointee is meant for an advisory role and as a communication channel between the Army's senior leadership and the junior commissioned officers and other ranks. The position, equivalent to Senior Sergeant Major in Western armies and Master Warrant Officer in the Indian Air Force, will be established at all commands as well as at the COAS-level. The tenure is set for two years and extendable to three years.

== Structure ==
Currently, the Northern Commands has been assigned operational units under four corps: XIV Corps, I Corps, XV Corps and XVI Corps.

In 2021, the Strike One Corps was re-organised to join the Northern Command to assist at the Ladakh border with China.

Structure of Northern Command
| Corps | Corps HQ | GOC of Corps (Corps Commander) | Assigned Units | Unit HQ |
|---|---|---|---|---|
| XIV Corps (Fire and Fury Corps) | Leh, Ladakh | Lt Gen Madanraj Pande | 3 Infantry Division | Karu, Ladakh |
| XIV Corps (Fire and Fury Corps) | Leh, Ladakh | Lt Gen Madanraj Pande | 8 Mountain Division | Dras, Ladakh |
| XIV Corps (Fire and Fury Corps) | Leh, Ladakh | Lt Gen Madanraj Pande | 72 Infantry Division | Pathankot, Punjab |
| XIV Corps (Fire and Fury Corps) | Leh, Ladakh | Lt Gen Madanraj Pande | 254 (Independent) Armoured Brigade | Leh, Ladakh |
| XIV Corps (Fire and Fury Corps) | Leh, Ladakh | Lt Gen Madanraj Pande | 102 (Independent) Infantry Brigade | Partapur, Ladakh |
| XIV Corps (Fire and Fury Corps) | Leh, Ladakh | Lt Gen Madanraj Pande | 118 (Independent) Infantry Brigade | Nyoma, Ladakh |
| XV Corps (Chinar Corps) | Srinagar, Jammu & Kashmir | Lt Gen Balbir Singh | 19 Mountain Division | Baramulla, Jammu & Kashmir |
| XV Corps (Chinar Corps) | Srinagar, Jammu & Kashmir | Lt Gen Balbir Singh | 28 Infantry Division | Gurez, Jammu & Kashmir |
| XV Corps (Chinar Corps) | Srinagar, Jammu & Kashmir | Lt Gen Balbir Singh | Rashtriya Rifles "Kilo Force" | N/A |
| XV Corps (Chinar Corps) | Srinagar, Jammu & Kashmir | Lt Gen Balbir Singh | Rashtriya Rifles "Victor Force" | N/A |
| XVI Corps (White Knight Corps) | Nagarota, Jammu & Kashmir | Lt Gen Prasanna Kishore Mishra | 10 RAPID Division | Akhnoor, Jammu & Kashmir |
| XVI Corps (White Knight Corps) | Nagarota, Jammu & Kashmir | Lt Gen Prasanna Kishore Mishra | 25 Infantry Division | Rajauri, Jammu & Kashmir |
| XVI Corps (White Knight Corps) | Nagarota, Jammu & Kashmir | Lt Gen Prasanna Kishore Mishra | 39 Mountain Division | Yol, Himachal Pradesh |
| XVI Corps (White Knight Corps) | Nagarota, Jammu & Kashmir | Lt Gen Prasanna Kishore Mishra | Rashtriya Rifles "Delta Force" | N/A |
| XVI Corps (White Knight Corps) | Nagarota, Jammu & Kashmir | Lt Gen Prasanna Kishore Mishra | Rashtriya Rifles "Romeo Force" | N/A |
| XVI Corps (White Knight Corps) | Nagarota, Jammu & Kashmir | Lt Gen Prasanna Kishore Mishra | Rashtriya Rifles "Uniform Force" | N/A |
| XVI Corps (White Knight Corps) | Nagarota, Jammu & Kashmir | Lt Gen Prasanna Kishore Mishra | 10 Artillery Brigade | N/A |
| I Corps (Strike One Corps) | Mathura, Uttar Pradesh | Lt Gen V Hariharan | 4 RAPID Division | Prayagraj, Uttar Pradesh |
| I Corps (Strike One Corps) | Mathura, Uttar Pradesh | Lt Gen V Hariharan | 6 Mountain Division | Bareilly, Uttar Pradesh |
| I Corps (Strike One Corps) | Mathura, Uttar Pradesh | Lt Gen V Hariharan | 42 Artillery Division | Bassi, Rajasthan |
| I Corps (Strike One Corps) | Mathura, Uttar Pradesh | Lt Gen V Hariharan | 14 (Independent) Armoured Brigade | Bhatinda, Punjab |

== Precursors (1895–1947) ==
Following is the List of precursors to the Northern Command and their commanders:

=== Punjab Command (1895–1907) ===
General Officer Commanding-in-Chief Punjab Command
| S.No | Name | Assumed office | Left office | Unit of Commission |
|---|---|---|---|---|
| 1 | General Sir William S. A. Lockhart GCB, KCSI | April 1895 | Nov 1898 | 44th Bengal Native Infantry |
| 2 | General Sir Arthur Power Palmer KCB | Nov 1898 | March 1900 | 5th Bengal Light Infantry |
| Acting | Lieutenant General Charles C. Egerton CB, DSO | March 1899 | Oct 1901 | 31st (Huntingdonshire) Regiment of Foot |
| 3 | General Sir Bindon Blood KCB | Oct 1901 | Oct 1904 | Royal Engineers |

=== Northern Command (1904–1908) ===
General Officer Commanding-in-Chief Northern Command
| S.No | Name | Assumed office | Left office | Unit of Commission |
|---|---|---|---|---|
| 1 | General Sir Bindon Blood KCB | Oct 1904 | June 1907 | Royal Engineers |

=== Northern Army (1908–1920) ===
General Officer Commanding-in-Chief Northern Army
| S.No | Name | Assumed office | Left office | Unit of Commission |
|---|---|---|---|---|
| 1 | General Sir Alfred Gaselee GCIE, KCB | June 1907 | Nov 1908 | Sutherland Highlanders |
| 2 | Lieutenant General Sir Josceline H. Wodehouse KCB, CMG | Nov 1908 | Oct 1910 | Royal Artillery |
| 3 | Lieutenant General Sir James Willcocks KCB, KCSI, DSO | Oct 1910 | Aug 1914 | 100th Regiment of Foot |
| 4 | Lieutenant General Sir Robert I. Scallon KCB, KCIE, DSO | Aug 1914 | Feb 1915 | 72nd Highlanders |
| 5 | General Sir John E. Nixon KCB | Feb 1915 | Apr 1915 | 75th Regiment of Foot |
| Vacant | | Apr 1915 | May 1916 | - |
| 6 | General Sir Arthur A. Barrett GCB, GCSI, KCVO | May 1916 | May 1920 | |

=== Northern Command (1920–1942) ===
General Officer Commanding-in-Chief Northern Command
| S.No | Name | Assumed office | Left office | Unit of Commission |
|---|---|---|---|---|
| 1 | General Sir William R. Birdwood, Bt GCB, GCMG, KCSI, CIE, DSO | Nov 1920 | Nov 1924 | Royal Scots Fusiliers |
| 2 | General Sir Claud W. Jacob KCB, KCSI, KCMG | Nov 1924 | May 1926 | Worcestershire Regiment |
| 3 | General Sir Alexander S. Cobbe VC, GCB, KCSI, DSO | May 1926 | May 1930 | Indian Staff Corps |
| 4 | General Sir Robert A. Cassels GCB, CSI, DSO | May 1930 | May 1934 | Indian Staff Corps |
| 5 | General Sir Kenneth Wigram GCB, CSI, CBE, DSO | May 1934 | May 1936 | 2nd King Edward VII's Own Gurkha Rifles (The Sirmoor Rifles) |
| 6 | General Sir John F. S. D. Coleridge KCB, CMG, DSO | May 1936 | Jun 1940 | Indian Staff Corps |
| 7 | General Sir Alan F. Hartley KCSI, CB, DSO | Jun 1940 | Jan 1942 | Durham Light Infantry |
| 8 | General Sir Cyril D. Noyes KCSI, CB, CIE, MC | Jan 1942 | Apr 1942 | 2nd Queen Victoria's Own Rajput Light Infantry |

=== North-Western Army (1942–1945) ===
General Officer Commanding-in-Chief North-Western Army
| S.No | Name | Assumed office | Left office | Unit of Commission |
|---|---|---|---|---|
| 1 | General Sir Cyril D. Noyes KCSI, CB, CIE, MC | Apr 1942 | May 1943 | Royal Scots Fusiliers |
| 2 | General Sir Edward P. Quinan KCIE, CB, DSO, OBE | May 1943 | Aug 1943 | Worcestershire Regiment |
| 3 | General Sir Henry Finnis KCB, CSI, MC | Aug 1943 | May 1945 | Indian Staff Corps |
| Acting | Major-general Cecil Toovey CB, CBE, MC* | Jun 1945 | Oct 1945 | Indian Staff Corps |
| 4 | General Sir Richard N. O'Connor KCB, DSO*, MC | Oct 1945 | Nov 1945 | Cameronians (Scottish Rifles) |

=== Northern Command (1945–1947) ===
General Officer Commanding-in-Chief Northern Command
| S.No | Name | Assumed office | Left office | Unit of Commission | Ref |
|---|---|---|---|---|---|
| 1 | General Sir Richard N. O'Connor KCB, DSO*, MC | Nov 1945 | May 1946 | Cameronians (Scottish Rifles) | |
| Acting | Lieutenant General Douglas D. Gracey CB, CBE, MC* | May 1946 | Oct 1946 | Royal Munster Fusiliers | |
| 2 | Lieutenant General Frank W. Messervy KCSI, KBE, CB, DSO* | Oct 1946 | Aug 1947 | 9th Hodson's Horse | |

== List of GOC-in-C of Northern Command (1972–present) ==
Following is the list of General Officer Commanding-in-Chief of Northern Command after its re-raising in 1972:

General Officer Commanding-in-Chief Northern Command
| S.No | Rank | Name | Assumed office | Left office | Unit of Commission | Ref |
|---|---|---|---|---|---|---|
| 1 | Lieutenant General | Premindra Singh Bhagat PVSM VC | June 1972 | 28 July 1974 | Bombay Sappers | |
| 2 | Lieutenant General | Harish Chandra Rai PVSM | 28 July 1974 | 31 July 1978 | Rajputana Rifles | |
| 3 | Lieutenant General | Gurbachan Singh PVSM | 1 August 1978 | 31 December 1979 | 20 Lancers | |
| 4 | Lieutenant General | Suraj Prakash Malhotra PVSM | 1 January 1980 | 30 September 1982 | Brigade of The Guards | |
| 5 | Lieutenant General | Manohar Lal Chibber PVSM, AVSM | 1 October 1982 | 31 August 1985 | 5th Gorkha Rifles (Frontier Force) | |
| 6 | Lieutenant General | Ashoka Kumar Handoo PVSM | 1 September 1985 | 31 May 1987 | Brigade of Guards | |
| 7 | Lieutenant General | Biddanda Chengappa Nanda PVSM, AVSM | 1 June 1987 | 31 May 1989 | Mahar Regiment | |
| 8 | Lieutenant General | Gurinder Singh PVSM, AVSM | 1 June 1989 | 30 September 1991 | 4th Horse (Hodson's Horse) | |
| 9 | Lieutenant General | Diwan Siri Ram Sahni PVSM, SM | 1 October 1991 | 31 August 1993 | Madras Sappers | |
| 10 | Lieutenant General | Surrinder Singh PVSM, AVSM | 1 September 1993 | 31 August 1996 | 17th Horse (Poona Horse) | |
| 11 | Lieutenant General | Sundararajan Padmanabhan PVSM, AVSM, VSM | 1 September 1996 | 31 December 1998 | Regiment of Artillery | |
| 12 | Lieutenant General | Hari Mohan Khanna SYSM, PVSM, AVSM | 1 January 1998 | 31 January 2001 | 4th Gorkha Rifles | |
| 13 | Lieutenant General | Rustum Kaikhusrau Nanavatty PVSM, UYSM, AVSM | 1 February 2001 | 31 May 2003 | 8th Gorkha Rifles | |
| 14 | Lieutenant General | Hari Prasad PVSM, AVSM, VSM | 1 June 2003 | 31 July 2005 | Maratha Light Infantry | |
| 15 | Lieutenant General | Deepak Kapoor PVSM, AVSM, SM, VSM | 1 September 2005 | 30 December 2006 | Regiment of Artillery | |
| 16 | Lieutenant General | Harcharanjit Singh Panag PVSM, AVSM | 1 January 2006 | 29 February 2008 | Sikh Regiment | |
| 17 | Lieutenant General | Prabodh Chandra Bhardwaj PVSM, AVSM, VrC, SC, VSM | 1 March 2008 | 30 September 2009 | Parachute Regiment | |
| 18 | Lieutenant General | Baljit Singh Jaswal PVSM, AVSM*, VSM | 1 October 2009 | 31 December 2010 | Jammu and Kashmir Rifles | |
| 19 | Lieutenant General | K. T. Parnaik PVSM, UYSM, YSM | 1 January 2011 | 30 June 2013 | Rajputana Rifles | |
| 20 | Lieutenant General | Sanjiv Chachra PVSM, AVSM, VSM | 1 July 2013 | 31 May 2014 | Rajput Regiment | |
| 21 | Lieutenant General | Deependra Singh Hooda PVSM, UYSM, AVSM, VSM* | 1 June 2014 | 30 November 2016 | 4th Gorkha Rifles | |
| 22 | Lieutenant General | Devraj Anbu PVSM, UYSM, AVSM, YSM, SM | 1 December 2016 | 31 May 2018 | Sikh Light Infantry | |
| 23 | Lieutenant General | Ranbir Singh PVSM, UYSM, AVSM*, YSM, SM | 1 June 2018 | 31 January 2020 | Dogra Regiment | |
| 24 | Lieutenant General | Yogesh Kumar Joshi PVSM, UYSM, AVSM, VrC, SM | 1 February 2020 | 31 January 2022 | Jammu and Kashmir Rifles | |
| 25 | Lieutenant General | Upendra Dwivedi PVSM, AVSM | 1 February 2022 | 18 February 2024 | Jammu and Kashmir Rifles | |
| 26 | Lieutenant General | M. V. Suchindra Kumar PVSM, UYSM, AVSM, YSM*, VSM | 19 February 2024 | 30 April 2025 | Assam Regiment | |
| 27 | Lieutenant General | Pratik Sharma SYSM, PVSM, AVSM, SM | 1 May 2025 | Incumbent | Madras Regiment | |

== Sources ==
- Rinaldi, Richard; Rikhye, Ravi (2011). Indian Army Order of Battle. General Data. ISBN 978-0982054178.
- http://ww2talk.com/index.php?threads/where-did-brigades-go-vanished-why-and-who-disbanded.70950/ - list of brigades on the frontier in 1939
