= Cyril Noyes =

British officer in the Indian Army

General Sir Cyril Noyes KCSI CB CIE MC
- Born: 4 February 1885; Hammersmith, London, England
- Died: 11 March 1946 (aged 61); Rathdown, County Wicklow, Ireland
- Military career
- Allegiance: United Kingdom
- Branch: British Army; British Indian Army
- Service years: 1904–1943
- Rank: General
- Unit: Royal Artillery
- Commands: 2nd Battalion, 2nd Punjab Regiment; 2nd Indian Infantry Brigade; North Western Army
- Conflicts: World War I World War II
- Awards: Knight Commander of the Order of the Star of India; Companion of the Order of the Bath; Companion of the Order of the Indian Empire; Military Cross

General Sir Cyril Dupré Noyes KCSI CB CIE MC (4 February 1885 – 11 March 1946) was a British officer in the Indian Army.

== Personal ==
Noyes was born in 1885, the son of the Reverend Henry Edward Noyes, D.D. He was educated at St. Lawrence College, Ramsgate and the Royal Military Academy, Woolwich. He married Violet Maud Edith, eldest daughter of Colonel H. C. Lucas in 1918.

== Military career ==
Noyes was commissioned into the Royal Garrison Artillery 21 December 1904 but transferred to the Indian Army, being posted to the 2nd Queen Victoria's Own Rajput Light Infantry on 23 September 1908.

He served on anti-arms smuggling operations in the Persian Gulf from 1913 to 1914. During World War 1, he served in Egypt from 1914 to 1915 and then in Mesopotamia in 1916, for which he was awarded the Military Cross.

Back in India, he was appointed Commanding Officer of the 2nd battalion, 2nd Punjab Regiment from 16 March 1929 and held command until 15 March 1933.

After attending the Imperial Defence College, he was appointed commander of the 2nd Indian Infantry Brigade from 6 September 1935 to 25 November 1938. He saw frontier service during the Mohmand campaign of 1935 and again during operations in Waziristan in 1936–37, for which he was awarded the CIE.

He served in World War II as Deputy Quartermaster-General at Army Headquarters, India from 1939, as Director of Movements & Quartering at Army Headquarters, India from 1940 and as a District Commander in India from 1941. He went on to be Quartermaster-General at Army Headquarters, India in 1942 and General Officer Commanding-in-Chief North Western Army in 1942. He retired in 1943 and died in 1946.

== Bibliography ==
- Smart, Nick (2005). Biographical Dictionary of British Generals of the Second World War. Barnesley: Pen & Sword. ISBN 1844150496.

Military offices
Preceded by Sir Alan Hartley	GOC-in-C North Western Army, India; 1942–1943	Succeeded by Sir Edward Quinan
