= Manohar Lal Chibber =

Indian Army officer and writer (1927–2015)

Lieutenant General Manohar Lal Chibber Padma Bhushan PVSM AVSM
- Born: 24 August 1927; India
- Died: 2015 (aged 87–88)
- Military career
- Allegiance: India
- Branch: Indian Army
- Rank: Lieutenant General
- Unit: 5 Gorkha Rifles (Frontier Force)
- Commands: Northern Army
- Awards: Padma Bhushan; Param Vishisht Seva Medal; Ati Vishisht Seva Medal

Manohar Lal Chibber (24 August 1927 – 2015) was an Indian Army officer and writer, known for his involvement in the Siachen conflict of 1986. He held the position of a Lieutenant General in the Indian Army and is a recipient of the Ati Vishisht Seva Medal and the Param Vishisht Seva Medal.

Chibber was GOC-in-C of India's Northern Command, Adjutant General, and Director of Military Operations. He was a faculty at the Indian Military Academy, Dehradun and the Defence Services Staff College, Wellington.

Chibber held a doctoral degree in Leadership and was a recipient of the Jawaharlal Nehru Fellowship. Chibber was a director of the Management Development Institute, a centre of higher training for the Indian Administrative Service officers and corporate leaders.

Chibber was the author of several books on military and leadership, viz. Pakistan's Criminal Folly in Kashmir, Military Leadership to Prevent Military Coup, Soldier's Role in National Integration, Leadership in the Indian Army during eighties and nineties, History of Jammu and Kashmir Light Infantry, Para Military Forces National Service For Defence, Development And National Integration Of India and Sai Baba's Mahavakya on Leadership.

In 1986, he was awarded the Padma Bhushan, India's third highest civilian award. Chibber died in 2015.

== Bibliography ==
- Manohar Lal Chibber (1979). Para Military Forces. United Service Institution of India.
- Manohar Lal Chibber (1985). Leadership in the Indian Army during eighties and nineties. United Service Institution of India. p. 40.
- Manohar Lal Chibber (1987). Military leadership to prevent military coup. Lancer International.
- Manohar Lal Chibber (1991). Soldier's Role in National Integration. Lancer International. p. 238. ISBN 9788170620105.
- Manohar Lal Chibber (1992). History of Jammu and Kashmir Light Infantry. Jammu and Kashmir Light Infantry Regimental Centre.
- Manohar Lal Chibber (1995). National Service For Defence, Development And National Integration Of India. Kartikeya Publications. ISBN 978-81-85823-07-2.
- Manohar Lal Chibber (1996). Sai Baba's Mahavakya on Leadership: Book for Youth, Parents and Teachers. Sri Sathya Sai Book & Publications Trust. ISBN 978-81-7208-180-5.
- Manohar Lal Chibber (1998). Pakistan's Criminal Folly in Kashmir: The Drama of Accession and Rescue of Ladakh. Manas Publications. ISBN 978-81-7049-095-1.

== See also ==
- Siachen conflict
- Kargil War
