= Sena Medal =

Indian army award

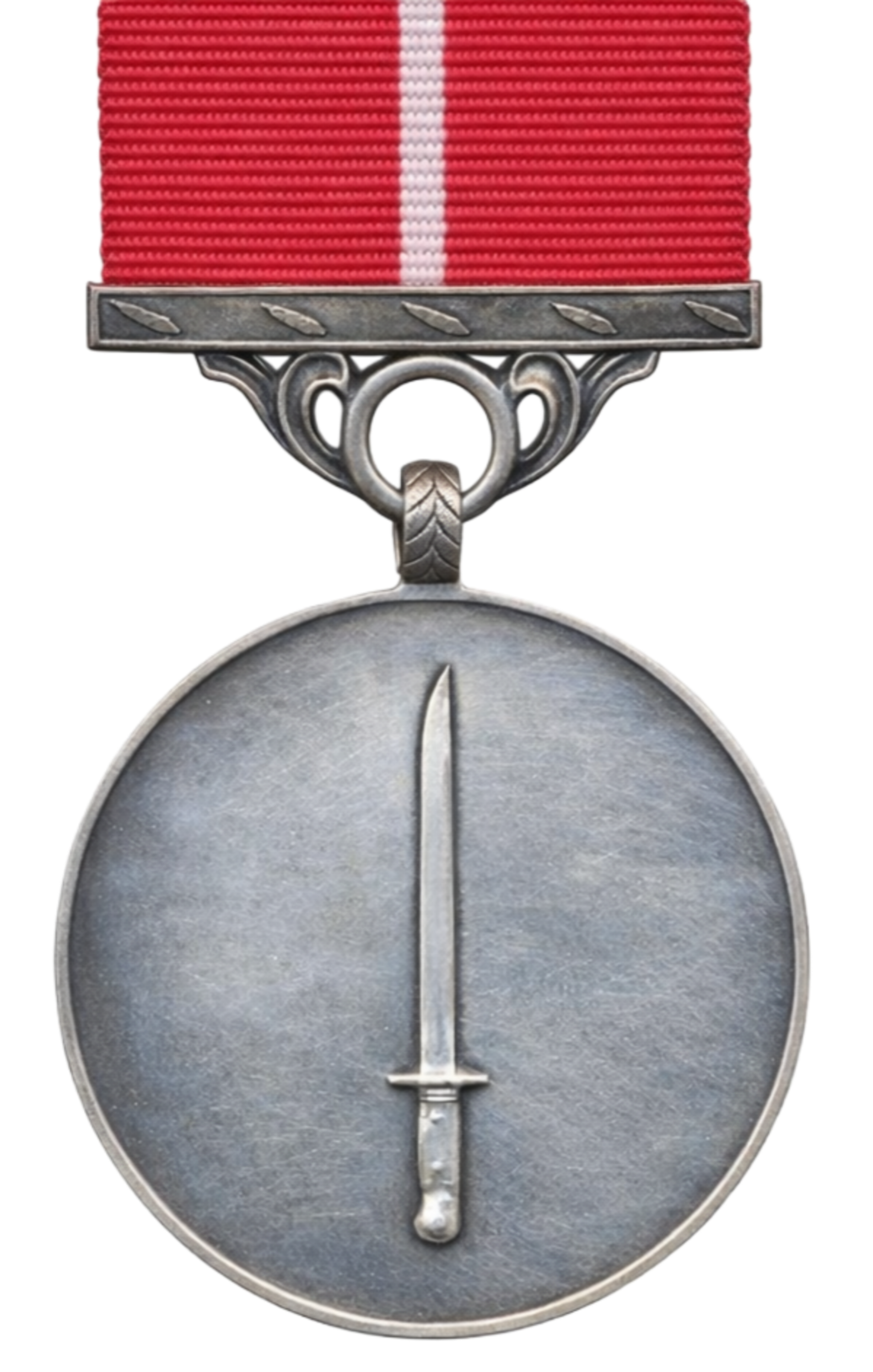
- Sena Medal and its ribbon
- Type: Military medal
- Awarded for: "Awarded for such individual acts of exceptional devotion to duty or courage as have special significance for the Army."
- Country: India
- Presented by: India
- Eligibility: All ranks of the army
- Post-nominals: SM
- Campaign: Currently awarded
- Established: 17 June 1960

Order of Wear
- Next (higher): Yudh Seva Medal
- Equivalent: Nau Sena Medal (Navy); Vayu Sena Medal (Air Force)
- Next (lower): Vishisht Seva Medal

The Sena Medal (lit. 'Army Medal') is awarded to members of the Indian army, of all ranks, "for such individual acts of exceptional devotion to duty or courage as have special significance for the Army." Awards may be made posthumously and a bar is authorized for subsequent awards of the Sena Medal.

It can be awarded for gallantry or it can also be for distinguished service carried out by any soldier, not in the face of the enemy. Therefore, the Sena Medal also serves as a sort of general commendation medal for the Indian Army. From 1 February 1999, the central government set a monthly stipend of Rs. 250 for recipients of the award when it is awarded for bravery. It has since been revised to Rs. 2000. It is preceded by the Vir Chakra, Shaurya Chakra and Yudh Seva Medal.

== History ==
The Sena Medal was instituted on 26 January 1960 by the Government of India, with the approval of the President of India. Five other medals were instituted on the same day — the Vishisht Seva Medal series (Class I, Class II, Class III), (Note: These awards were later renamed Param Vishisht Seva Medal, Ati Vishisht Seva Medal and Vishisht Seva Medal respectively.) the Sainya Seva Medal, Videsh Seva Medal, Nao Sena Medal and the Vayu Sena Medal.

== Medal ==
The medal has on it observe, a circular silver medal with a bayonet, pointed upwards. On the reverse, a standing soldier with the legend in Hindi "Sena Medal" above is displayed. The medal is suspended by a straight-bar suspender and is named on the edge. The medal is also often dated on the edge as well. The ribbon is 32 mm long in red colour, with a white central stripe.

== See also ==
- Nau Sena Medal
- Vayu Sena Medal
