= Colonel (India) =

Military rank of India

Colonel कर्नल
- Rank insignia of a colonel of the Indian Army
- Country: India
- Service branch: Indian Army
- Abbreviation: Col
- Rank group: Senior officers
- Rank: Colonel
- NATO rank code: OF 5
- Pay grade: Level 13
- Next higher rank: Brigadier
- Next lower rank: Lieutenant Colonel, Captain (India), Lieutenant
- Equivalent ranks: Captain (Indian Navy); Group Captain (Indian Air Force)

Colonel is a rank in the Indian Army. Like other armies, this rank is higher than lieutenant colonel. It is equivalent to captain in the Indian Navy and group captain in the Indian Air Force.

The Indian Army has followed the British Army rank system since India's independence from the British Empire in 1947. However, the St Edward's Crown in the rank insignia was replaced with the National Emblem of India, symbolising the sovereignty of the Government of India.

== Appointments ==
Colonels in the Indian Army command battalion-sized units (infantry battalions, artillery regiments, armoured regiments). Until the 1980s, battalions (and equivalents) were commanded by a lieutenant colonel. Colonels also serve as staff officers in divisions like Colonel General Staff (Col GS) and Colonel Administration (Col Adm). At Army headquarters, colonels hold the appointments of directors of directorates and branches.

== Insignia ==
The badges of rank have two five-pointed stars and the National emblem above. The gorget patches of a colonel consist of crimson patches with golden braids.

== Pay scale ==
Colonels are at pay level 13, with a monthly pay between ₹130,600 and ₹215,900 with a monthly service pay of ₹15,500. This is the first selection-grade rank. The promotion to the rank can happen through selection or on time-scale basis. A minimum of 15 years of commissioned service is required for an officer to be considered in the selection grade. This is the highest rank which may be attained by officers on time-scale promotion if not promoted to colonel by selection after 26 years of commissioned service.

== Colonel of the regiment ==
The colonel of the regiment (COR) is a tradition and position that the Indian Army has inherited from the British Army, as have other armies of the commonwealth. The post of COR is an elected post. All officers including and above the rank of colonel vote as do all battalion commanding officers (CO). The vote of the COs represents the vote of their soldiers. The COR is a senior officer of the regiment, usually the senior-most, who is a father-figure to the regiment and looks after the interests of the regiment. Thus, they are usually general officers or brigadiers. On ceremonial occasions, the COR wears the rank badges of a colonel rather than their actual rank.

== Famous colonels ==
- Rajyavardhan Singh Rathore - Olympic Silver medalist, former Minister of State for Youth affairs and Sports and Member of parliament from Jaipur Rural
- Narendra 'Bull' Kumar - mountaineer known for expeditions in the Himalayas, Karakoram and the Siachen Glacier
- Balbir Singh Kular - field hockey player for India who won the Asian Games Gold in 1966 and the Olympic Bronze in 1968
- Ajay Kothiyal - mountaineer and first Indian to climb Mt Manaslu, former Aam Aadmi Party and current Bharatiya Janta Party politician
- Colonel Jojan Thomas
- Col Rajiv Bhargwan
- Col Shivender Kanwar - known for being the Commanding officer of elite 7 Para SF. Post-retirement he founded Team Global Security Solutions Pvt Ltd, specialising in high-level security services.
- Col Kaushal Kashyap - A distinguished officer of the 21 Para (Special Forces) unit, and awarded the Shaurya Chakra in 2007 for his exceptional bravery during operations against militants in Northeast India.

== See also ==
- Army ranks and insignia of India
