= High Altitude Medal =

- Type: Military medal Service medal
- Awarded for: Tenure at high altitude.
- Presented by: India
- Eligibility: Members of the Indian Armed Forces
- Established: 1986
- Ribbon bar

Precedence
- Next (higher): Sainya Seva Medal
- Next (lower): Videsh Seva Medal

The High Altitude Medal (translated from Hindi: Uchch Tungata Padak) is issued to Indian service personnel who complete a specified tenure at high altitude. The medal was instituted following the President’s Secretariat Notification No - 72/Pres86 dated 12 September 1986. The medal was instituted in lieu of the clasp Himalaya to Sainya Seva Medal.

== Criteria ==
The award is given to those members of the Indian armed forces, who are eligible under the following criteria –

- Those who have completed a total service duration of 180 days in those areas, where high altitude allowance is admissible commencing from 1 April, 1984.
- This time limit is waived for those personnel who died or sustained wounds leading to premature evacuation.
- Personnel who are part of air crew or ejection crew of air maintenance units, who have carried out a minimum of 10 sorties or 40 hours of flying on transport support roles in these areas from 1 April, 1984.

High altitude allowance is admissible to personnel serving in field areas, which are situated at a height of 9000 feet and above. The medal may also be awarded to police and central armed police force personnel (CAPF) who serve in high altitude areas

== Design ==
The medal is circular in shape and made of cupro-nickel. It is 35 mm in diameter and fitted to a plain horizontal bar. The obverse has the State Emblem with its motto and the inscription “Ucch Tungta Medal” (उच्च तुंगता मेडल) in Hindi and English on both sides of the State Emblem along the rim. The reverse has the representation of the mountains. The ribbon is 32 mm in width with a Azure Blue colour background, white diagonal reverse V Shape stripes of 2 millimeters in width and a distance of 5 millimeters between the two stripes.
