= Videsh Seva Medal =

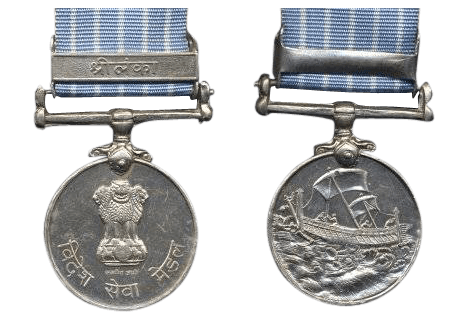
- The Videsh Seva Medal (with the Sri Lanka clasp)
- Type: Military medal Service medal
- Country: India
- Presented by: The President of India
- Status: Active
- Established: 26 January 1960; 66 years ago
- Ribbon Bar

Precedence
- Next (higher): High Altitude Medal (Note: Police (Special Duty) Medal-1962 is the medal/honour lower than Videsh Seva Medal in order of precedence.)
- Next (lower): Meritorious Service Medal (Note: President’s Police and Fire Services Medal for distinguished service is the medal/honour lower than Videsh Seva Medal in order of precedence.)

The Videsh Seva Medal is a service medal of the Indian Armed Forces. It is presented to all ranks of the three services for services rendered outside India. It was instituted on 26 January 1960. It can also be awarded posthumously

== History ==
The Videsh Seva Medal was instituted on 26 January 1960 by the Government of India, with the approval of the President of India. Five other medals were instituted on the same day — the Vishisht Seva Medal series (Class I, Class II, Class III), (Note: These awards were later renamed Param Vishisht Seva Medal, Ati Vishisht Seva Medal and Vishisht Seva Medal respectively.) the Sainya Seva Medal, Sena Medal, Nao Sena Medal and the Vayu Sena Medal.

At the time of institution, it was to be awarded for duties outside India on:

- the UN emergency Force or on loan to the Government of Egypt
- the staff of the Haile Selassie Military Academy in Ethiopia
- loan to the Government of Ghana
- the staff of the International Commission for Supervision and Control in Indo-China (Vietnam, Laos and Cambodia)
- loan to the Indonesian Government
- loan to the Iraqi Government
- the staff of the Neutral Nations Repatriation Commission or the Indian Custodian Force in Korea
- the staff of the United Nations Observation Group in Lebanon
- the effective strength of a unit or formation employed on the construction of the Tribhuvan Rajpath and airfields in Nepal or on the work of provision of signal communication during the Nepalese elections or on the effective strength of the Indian Military Training Mission or the Indian Military Training Advisory Group in Nepal or on survey or transport support roles over Nepal.

== Eligibility ==
All ranks of the three services – Indian Army, Indian Navy and Indian Air Force, along with the Territorial Army, embodied Auxiliary and Reserve Forces or any other lawfully constituted Armed Forces are eligible for the grant of the award. Nursing Officers and other members of Nursing Services are also eligible. Persons with regular staff of diplomatic mission do not fall within purview of the medal. Posthumous awards also may be made.

== Medal ==
The medal is circular in shape and is made of cupronickel. It is 35 mm in diameter, fitted to a plain horizontal bar with standard fitting. It shall have embossed on the obverse the State Emblem and the inscription below it along the rim. On its reverse, it shall have a warship of ancient times. The ribbon is 32 mm in width and is in cobalt blue colour with 5 vertical stripes of white dividing it into six equal parts. The clasps to the medal are bars 32 mm long with the name of the country of service inscribed on it.
