= Brigadier (India) =

Indian Army rank

Brigadier ब्रिगेडियर
- Rank insignia of a brigadier

- Vehicle star plate of brigadier
- Country: India
- Service branch: Indian Army
- Abbreviation: Brig
- Rank group: General officers
- Rank: One-star rank
- NATO rank code: OF 6
- Pay grade: Level 13A
- Next higher rank: Major General
- Next lower rank: Colonel
- Equivalent ranks: Commodore (Indian Navy); Air Commodore (Indian Air Force)

Brigadier is a one-star rank in the Indian Army. Brigadier ranks above the rank of Colonel and below the two-star rank of Major General.

The equivalent rank in the Indian Navy is Commodore and in the Indian Air Force is Air Commodore.

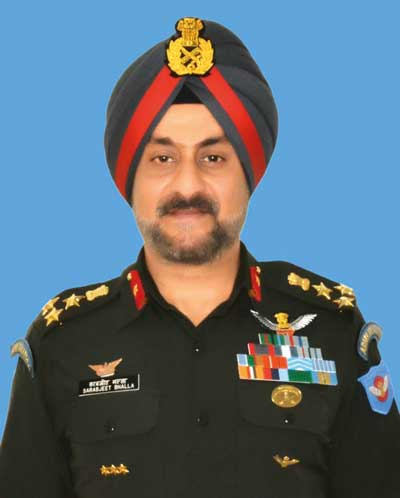
Brig Sarabjeet Singh in a brigadier's uniform.

== History ==
Colonel K. M. Cariappa was the first Indian to be promoted to the rank of brigadier, when he was promoted to the acting rank on 1 November 1944 during World War II. He however was not appointed a brigade commander, but a member of the Army reorganisation committee. He was appointed to the regular rank of brigadier on 1 May 1945 (the rank of brigadier was then a temporary appointment rather than a substantive rank).

== Appointments ==
Officers in the rank of brigadier command brigades. They also fill staff appointments like Brigadier General Staff (BGS) and Brigadier Administration (Brig Adm) at Corps headquarters. The military attachés and military advisors at India's high commissions and embassies in select countries are officers of the rank of brigadier. At Army headquarters, brigadiers hold the appointments of deputy director general of directorates and branches.

== Insignia ==
The badge of rank has the National emblem over three five-pointed stars in a triangular formation. A brigadier wears gorget patches which are crimson patches with one golden star.

== Pay scale ==
Brigadiers are at pay level 13A, with a monthly pay between ₹139,600 and ₹217,600 and a Military Service Pay (MSP) of ₹15,500. Promotion to the rank is through selection and 25 years of commissioned service is required for an officer to be considered.

== See also ==
- Army ranks and insignia of India

== Bibliography ==
- Singh, Vijay Kumar (2005). Leadership in the Indian Army: Biographies of Twelve Soldiers. SAGE. ISBN 978-0-7619-3322-9.
