= Sainya Seva Medal =

- Ribbon of the medal
- Type: Military medal Service medal
- Awarded for: Non-operational service under hardship conditions in severe climate.
- Presented by: India
- Clasps: Jammu and Kashmir; NEFA; Himalaya; Bengal-Assam; Andaman and Nicobar; Marusthal; SAMUDRI SEVA (6 YEARS SAILING)
- Established: 1960

Order of Wear
- Next (higher): Operation Parakram Medal
- Next (lower): High Altitude Medal

The Sainya Seva Medal is a medal of the Indian Armed Forces. The medal is awarded in recognition of non-operational service under conditions of hardship and severe climate in specified areas.

== History ==
The Sainya Seva Medal was instituted on 26 January 1960 by the Government of India, with the approval of the President of India. Five other medals were instituted on the same day - the Vishisht Seva Medal series (Class I, Class II, Class III), (Note: These awards were later renamed Param Vishisht Seva Medal, Ati Vishisht Seva Medal and Vishisht Seva Medal respectively.) the Videsh Seva Medal, Sena Medal, Nao Sena Medal and the Vayu Sena Medal.

== Criteria ==
The Sainya Seva Medal is awarded for an aggregate of one year non-operational service in a defined geographic area. These areas are considered to have hardship conditions and severe climates. The medal is always awarded with a clasp. An individual qualifying for the medal for the first time shall be awarded the medal, together with a clasp on which shall be inscribed the place where the service was rendered. Subsequent awards of the medal will only result in being awarded the clasp indicating the place where the service was rendered.

The medal may be awarded to commissioned officers, junior commissioned officers, other ranks, and Non-Combatants (enrolled) of the regular Army. Auxiliary, Reserve Forces, Nursing Officers, and other members of Nursing Services or any other lawfully constituted Armed Forces (such as police forces and central armed police forces) may also be awarded the medal.

== Clasps ==
The Sainya Seva Medal is awarded with the following clasps:

Jammu and Kashmir

Instituted 2 June 1960 and amended in 1967 and 1973, the clasp is awarded for an aggregate of one year of service in Jammu and Kashmir since 27 October 1947. Air force personnel may be eligible for award if they have carried out a minimum of ten sorties or forty hours of flying after 27 October 1947. Service used to qualify for the General Service Medal 1947 or for the Himalaya clasp will not be counted towards the Jammu and Kashmir clasp. The clasp bears inscription जम्मू कश्मीर separated by an image of a chinar leaf.

NEFA

Instituted 2 June 1960 and amended in 1966 and 1973, the clasp is awarded for an aggregate of one year of service in the North-East Frontier Agency (NEFA) employed in the construction of roads and airfields between 7 October 1952 and 15 November 1958. The clasp is also awarded to those personnel seconded to the Assam Rifles who complete an aggregate of one year of service in NEFA after 15 August 1947, and Air Force personnel who carried out a minimum of ten sorties or forty hours of flying after 7 October 1952. Service used to qualify for the Himalaya clasp will not be counted towards this clasp. The clasp bears a design like a horizontal stalk of bamboo with ने फ़ा engraved upon it.

Himalaya

Instituted 2 June 1960 and amended in 1964 and 1966, the clasp is awarded for an aggregate of one year of service in the defence of the northern in areas in the Himalayas. This roughly corresponds to portions of NEFA, and the Tibet borders of Ladakh, Uttarakhand and Sikkim. Air Force personnel must have carried out a minimum of ten sorties or forty hours of flying in areas and time periods specified to be eligible for award. The clasps bears the word हिमालय separated in the middle by a depiction of a pine tree. This clasp has not been awarded since 1986, with qualifying service now being recognized by the High Altitude Service Medal.

Bengal-Assam

Instituted 2 June 1960 and amended in 1967, the clasp is awarded for an aggregate of one year of service in specified areas of West Bengal and Assam after 26 October 1962. For flying personnel qualifying service is 10 sorties or 40 hours of flying over the specified areas of West Bengal and Assam after 26 October 1962. The clasp is plain with the words बंगाल and असम separated by a dash.

Andaman and Nicobar

Instituted 2 June 1960 and amended in 1967, the clasp is awarded for an aggregate of one year of service in the Andaman and Nicobar Islands after 20 May 1966. Flying personnel may qualify by completing 50 hours of flying in the Andaman and Nicobar Islands after 20 May 1966. The clasp bears the inscription अण्डमान और निकोबार with lotus flowers on either side.

Marusthal

Instituted 20 July 1984, the clasp is awarded for an aggregate of one year of service in qualifying desert areas of Gujarat and Rajasthan. Flying personnel may qualify by completing 10 sorties or 40 hours of flying over specified areas. The clasp is plain with the inscription मरुस्थल.

6YR/ 09 YR Sea Service

Instituted on 13 June 2017, through Gazette notification by Government of India dated 30 Jun 2017, all personnel of Indian Navy/ Air Force/ Army who have rendered cumulative 6 (six) years of " Sea service" and 9 (nine) years of "Sea service" for anti-piracy operations, seaward defence, coastal patrolling, deployment etc. qualify for wearing Sainya Seva Medal. The clasp is plain with the inscription 'समुद्री सेवा' for 06 years . For 09 years, clasp "दीर्घ समुद्री सेवा" is awarded with Samanya Seva Medal. The detailed eligibility criteria of all three services are laid down in the Gazette notification dated 30 Jun 2017.

== Appearance ==
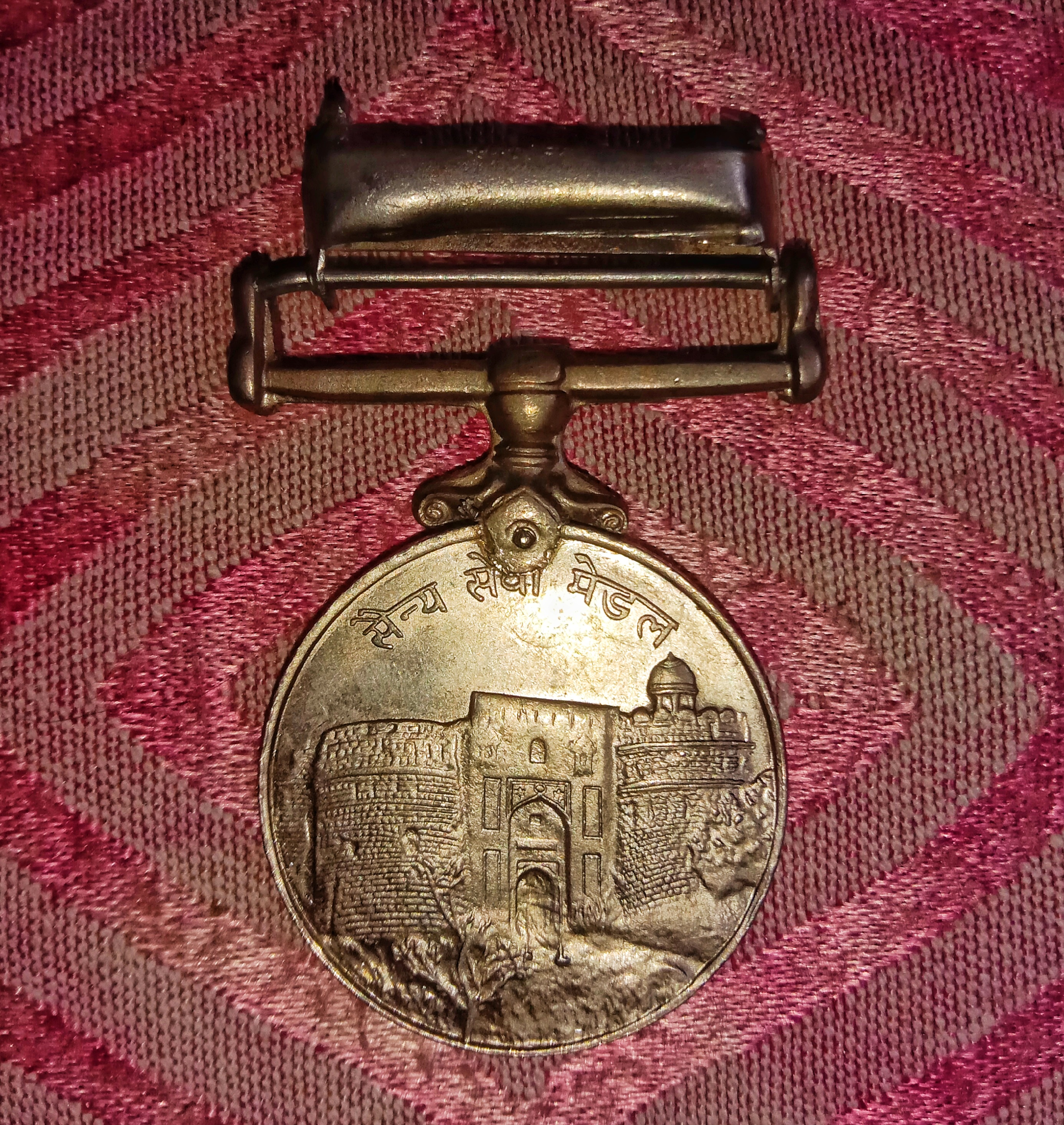
Reverse of the Sainya Seva Medal

The Sainya Seva Medal is circular in shape, made of cupro-nickel, 35 mm (1.4 in) in diameter. The medal hangs from straight suspension bar, to which the clasps are mounted. The obverse depicts Nanda Devi with bamboo in the foreground. The reverse depicts one of the gates of Purana Qila. Above is inscribed the words Sainya Seva Medal in Hindi script. The ribbon of the medal is saffron in color 32 mm (1.3 in). There is a single vertical stripe of white and another of dark green dividing which divides the ribbon equally in to three parts. It is one of the uncommon medals in the Indian Armed Forces where the flip side is wore at the front side.
