= Major general (India) =

General officer rank in the Indian Army

Major general मेजर जनरल
- Rank insignia of a major general

- Vehicle star plate of major general
- Country: India
- Service branch: Indian Army
- Abbreviation: Maj Gen
- Rank group: General officers
- Rank: Two-star rank
- NATO rank code: OF 7
- Pay grade: Level 14
- Next higher rank: Lieutenant general
- Next lower rank: Brigadier
- Equivalent ranks: Rear admiral (Indian Navy); Air vice marshal (Indian Air Force)

Major general is a two-star general officer rank in the Indian Army. It is the third-highest active rank in the Indian Army. A major general ranks above the one-star rank of brigadier and below the three-star rank of lieutenant general.

The equivalent rank in the Indian Navy is rear admiral and in the Indian Air Force is air vice marshal.

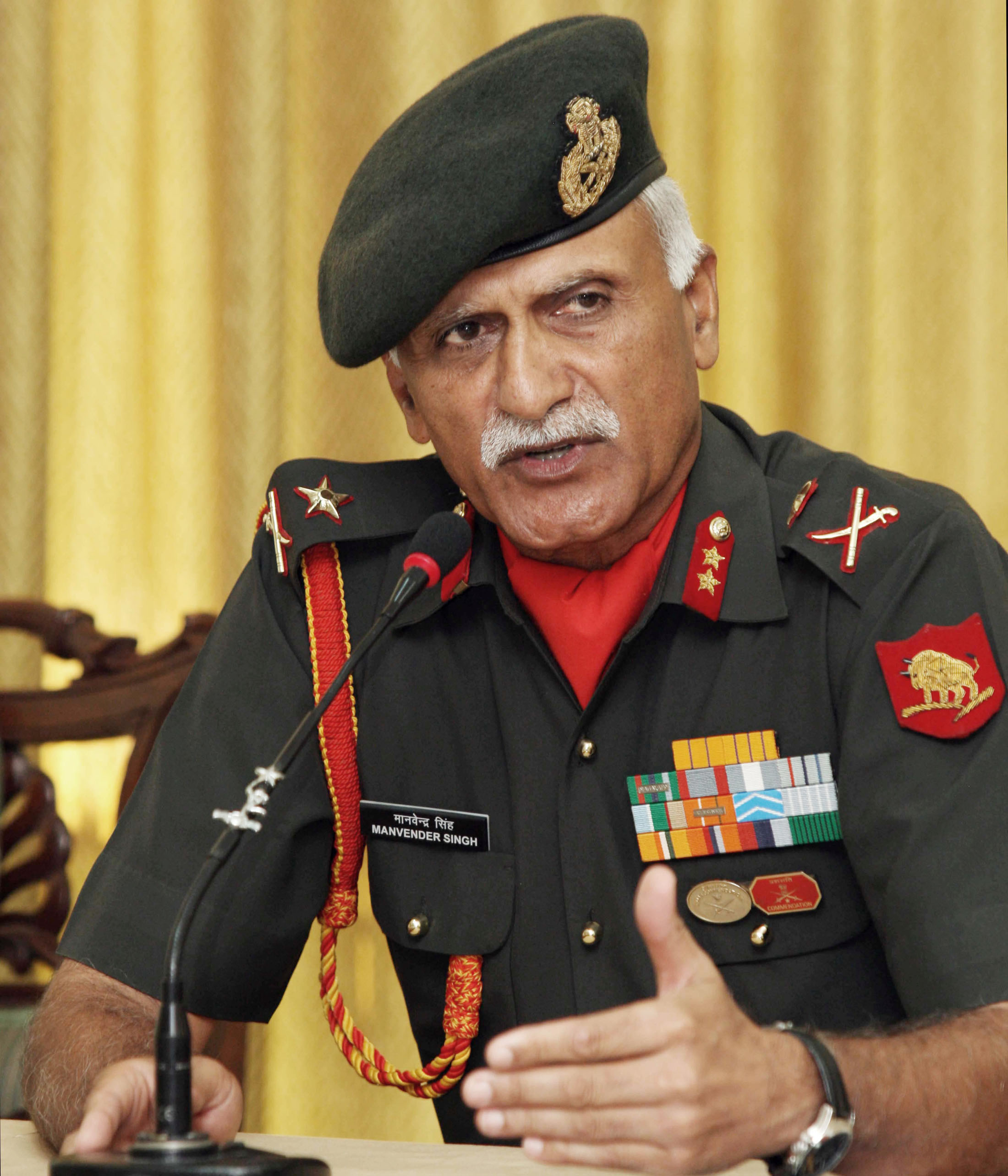
Maj Gen Manvender Singh in a Major General's uniform

== Appointments ==
Officers in the rank of major general hold important appointments like general officer commanding a division. The Indian Army has 40 divisions in 14 corps. The general officers commanding sub areas across the country are also of the rank of major general. At army headquarters, major generals hold the appointments of additional director general in different directorates and staff branches.

=== Ministry of Defence HQ ===
In the Department of Military Affairs of the Ministry of Defence, an officer from all the three armed forces of the rank of Major General and equivalent is currently designated as Joint Secretary to the Government of India (Army/Navy/AirForce).

== Insignia ==
The badges of rank have a crossed sword and baton and a five-pointed star above. A major general wears gorget patches which are crimson patches with two golden stars.

== Order of precedence ==
A major general who is a principal staff officer ranks at No. 25 in the Indian order of precedence. Other major generals are at No. 26 in the order of precedence.

Major generals are at pay level 14, with a monthly pay between ₹144,200 (US$1,950) and ₹218,200 (US$2,950).

== Rank insignia and personal flag ==
Indian Army major general shoulder insignia

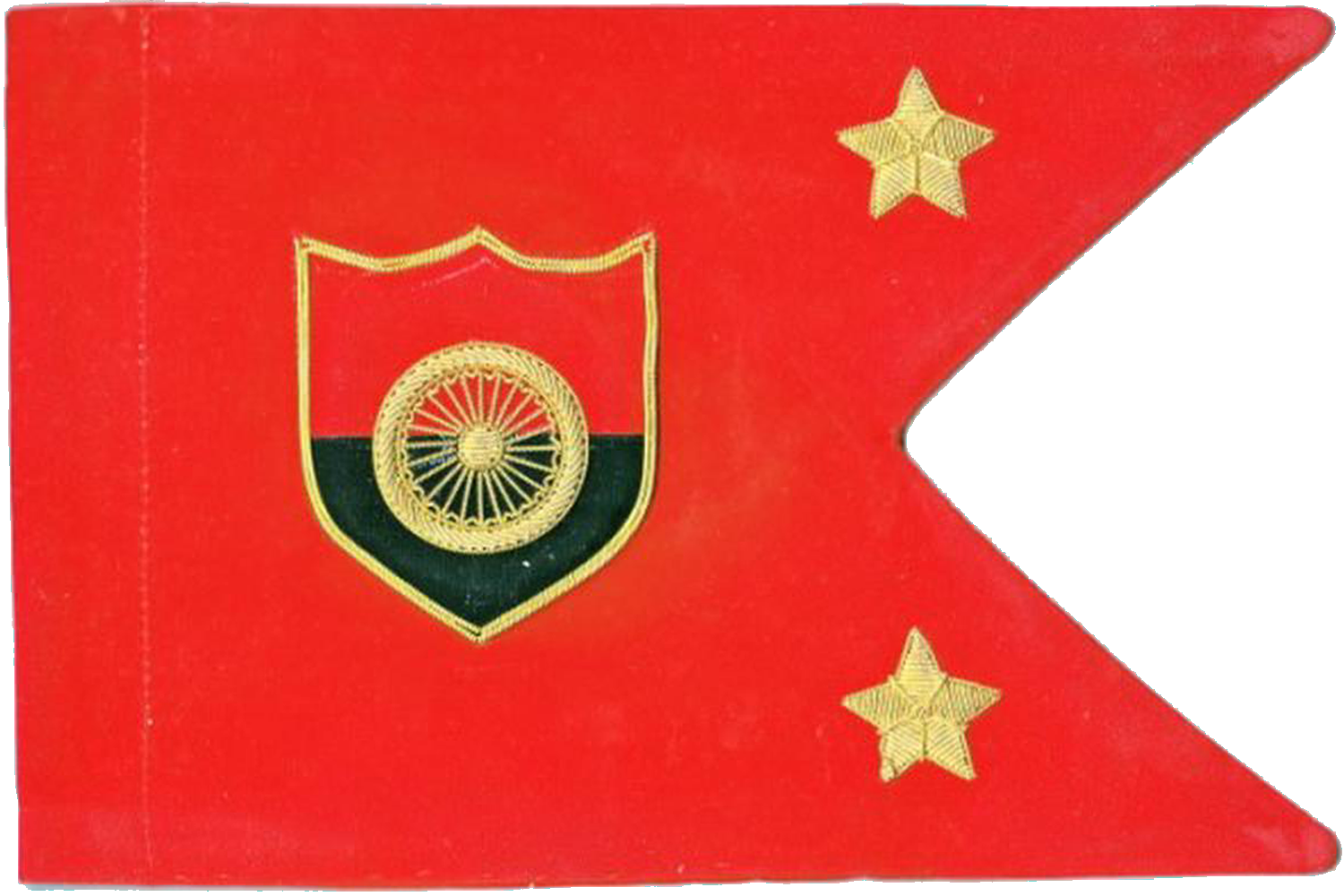
Flag of a major general at army headquarters

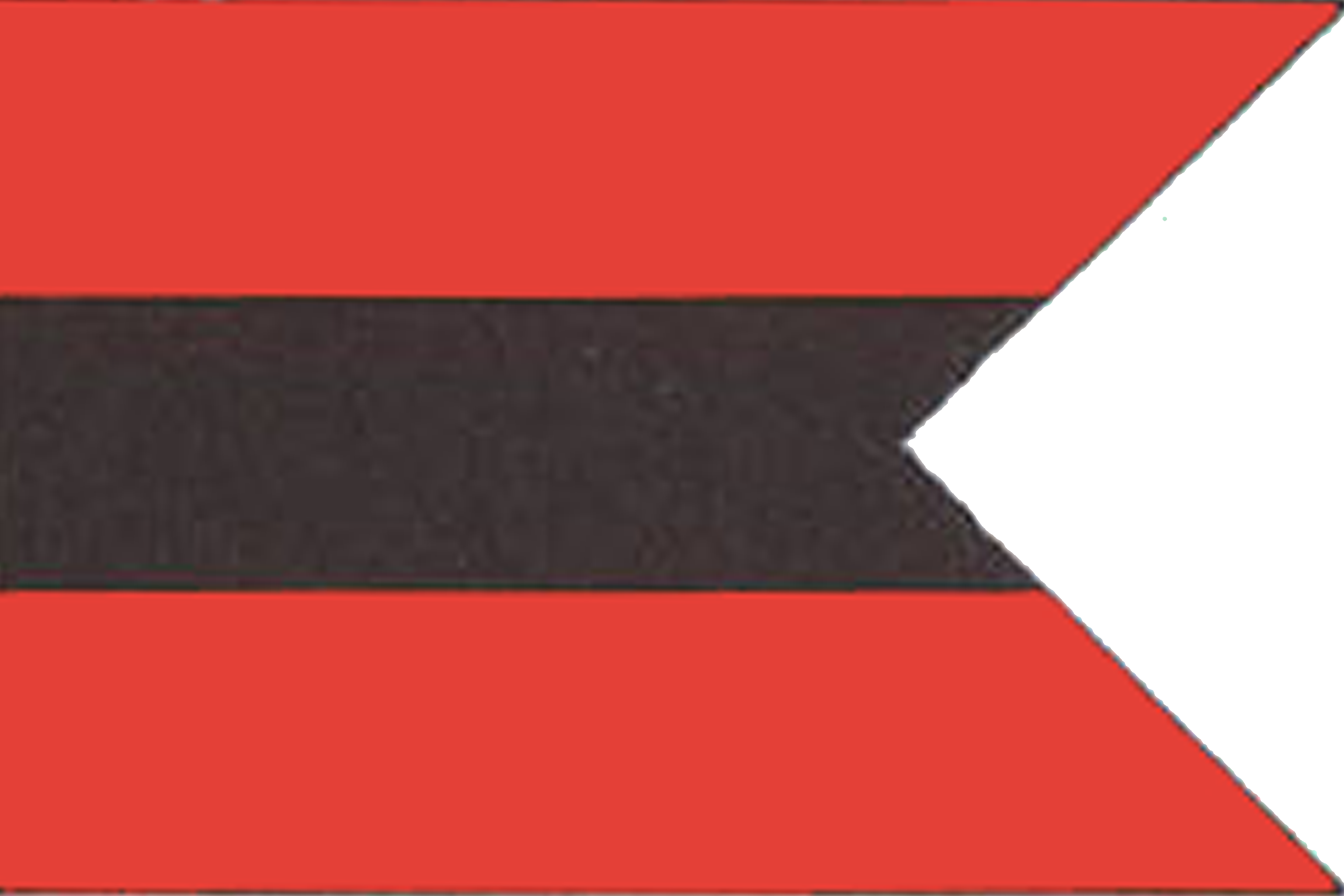
Flag of a major general on staff

== See also ==
- List of serving generals of the Indian Army
- Army ranks and insignia of India
- General officer commanding
