= Kashmir Premier League =

Kashmir Premier League may refer to:

- Kashmir Premier League (India), a 14-team Twenty20 cricket league in Jammu and Kashmir, India
- Kashmir Premier League (Pakistan), a 6-team Twenty20 cricket league in Azad Kashmir, Pakistan
