= Syed Ata Hasnain =

Governor of Bihar

Lieutenant General Syed Ata Hasnain PVSM, AVSM, UYSM, SM, VSM**
- Hasnain, c. 2026
- Born: 1953 (age 72–73 years)
- Spouse: Sabiha Hasnain
- Relatives: Syed Mahdi Hasnain (father)
- Military career
- Allegiance: India
- Branch: Indian Army
- Service years: 1974–2013
- Rank: Lieutenant General
- Service number: IC-30353P
- Unit: 4 Garhwal Rifles
- Commands: XV Corps; XXI Corps; 19th Infantry Division; 12th Infantry Brigade; 4 Garhwal Rifles
- Awards: Param Vishisht Seva Medal; Uttam Yudh Seva Medal; Ati Vishisht Seva Medal; Sena Medal; Vishisht Seva Medal (Bar)

Governor of Bihar
- Incumbent
- Assumed office 14 March 2026
- President: Droupadi Murmu
- Chief Minister: Nitish Kumar; Samrat Choudhary
- Preceded by: Arif Mohammad Khan
- Website: Ata Hasnain

Lieutenant General Syed Ata Hasnain (born 1953), PVSM, UYSM, AVSM, SM, VSM & Bar is a former General officer of the Indian Army who is serving as the 43rd Governor of Bihar since 2026.

Hasnain last served as the Military Secretary. Earlier, he commanded the 15 Corps in the state of Jammu and Kashmir and the XXI Corps. In 2018, he was appointed Chancellor of Central University of Kashmir, and in 2020 was appointed Member of the National Disaster Management Authority.

== Early life and education ==
Syed Ata Hasnain is the second son of Major General Syed Mahdi Hasnain, PVSM. He completed his school education at Sherwood College, Nainital. Thereafter he attended Delhi University. where he received a B.A. (Honours) degree in History, in 1972. General Hasnain is an alumnus of the Asia Pacific Center for Security Studies (APCSS), Hawaii, USA and the Royal College of Defence Studies, London. He also studied at King's College, University of London.

== Military career ==
Syed Ata Hasnain was commissioned into the 4th Battalion, Garhwal Rifles, from the Indian Military Academy, Dehradun, on 16 June 1974. It is a unit raised by his father. He eventually commanded the same battalion. He participated in Operation Pawan in Sri Lanka during 1988-90, and took part in counter insurgency operations in Punjab in 1990–91. During the 1990s, the then Colonel Hasnain served with the United Nations in Mozambique, and later, war torn Rwanda. He attended the Higher Command Course at Army War College, Mhow, and thereafter served as Colonel General Staff at the HQ Victor Force at Avantipura South Kashmir, at the height of the militancy. As a Brigadier, he served in J&K as Commander, 12 Infantry Brigade, on the Line of Control, at Uri.

He later commanded 19 Infantry Division in Baramulla, Jammu and Kashmir, as a Major General, serving under the overall direction of XV Corps. As a Lieutenant General, Hasnain has been posted as General Officer Commanding (GOC), XXI Corps, in Bhopal, Madhya Pradesh. In October, 2010, it was announced that he will be returning to XV Corps in Kashmir, as the GOC of that formation. As GOC of XV Corps, he has held several meetings to redress grievances and concerns of commons citizens, and to bring the Army closer to them He conceived and operationalised the "Hearts Doctrine" which focused on people as the centre of gravity in Kashmir. His contribution towards improving the security scenario in Kashmir was the balance he brought between the employment of hard power in counter infiltration and counter terrorist operations and military soft power. Gen. Hasnain played a pivotal role in starting the Kashmir Premier League (KPL) in 2011, to build bridges between Kashmiris and Indian Army men. Throughout his tenure he applied an intellectual approach towards conflict and even guided the State Government in its approach as its Security Adviser. On 9 June 2012, Lt Gen Hasnain took office as the Military Secretary, at Army Headquarters, New Delhi. His unique and innovative approach defined as "Playing Friend Not God" has been widely appreciated as the new HR management mantra across domains in and outside the military.

On 7 Sep 2013, Lt Gen Syed Ata Hasnain was awarded his first civilian honor by the Capital Foundation Society of Delhi. He received the award from the Vice President of India, Mohammad Hamid Ansari. The award was for Military leadership of an exceptional order. On 9 Sep 2013, the General Officer spoke at the Global Town Hall organized by the US based Ali Soufan Group and Qatar International Academy for Security Studies. This event was simultaneously held at New York, Singapore, Dakkar and Belfast. Lt Gen Hasnain spoke at Singapore on the subject 'Applying Counter Narratives in Conflict Stabilisation: The Heart is My Weapon Doctrine in Kashmir's Conflict Zone'.

== Post-retirement ==
Ever since his superannuation on 30 June 2013, General Hasnain has promoted the cause and perception of the Indian Army. He is a member of Track 2 diplomacy with Pakistan. He is a Visiting Fellow of the Vivekananda International Foundation, New Delhi and Senior Fellow with Delhi Policy Group, two of the most prominent think tanks of New Delhi. He is also on the Governing Council of Institute of Peace and Conflict Studies. He writes for The Times of India, The Indian Express, The New Indian Express, The Asian Age, Brighter Kashmir and The Tribune on strategic issues. He lectures at the National Academy of Administration, Mussoorie and National Academy of Customs, Excise and Narcotics (NACEN), Faridabad, besides the College of Air Warfare, Army War College, Mhow, Defence Services Staff College and various institutions under the All India Management Association and Centre for Land Warfare Studies (CLAWS). He has recently lectured at United Service Institution (USI) and Institute for Defence Studies and Analyses (IDSA).

Gen Hasnain introduced the Scholar Warrior concept to the Indian Army, and after superannuation has extensively promoted the necessity of incorporating military intellectualism and strategic culture in India.

On 13 July 2018, he was appointed as the chancellor of the Kashmir university, for a period of 5 years.

On 21 February 2020 he was appointed Member of the National Disaster Management Authority (NDMA) In that appointment, he is currently also a member of the Empowered Committee for Information & Communication set up by the Prime Minister's Office (PMO).

== Governorships (2026 - Incumbent) ==
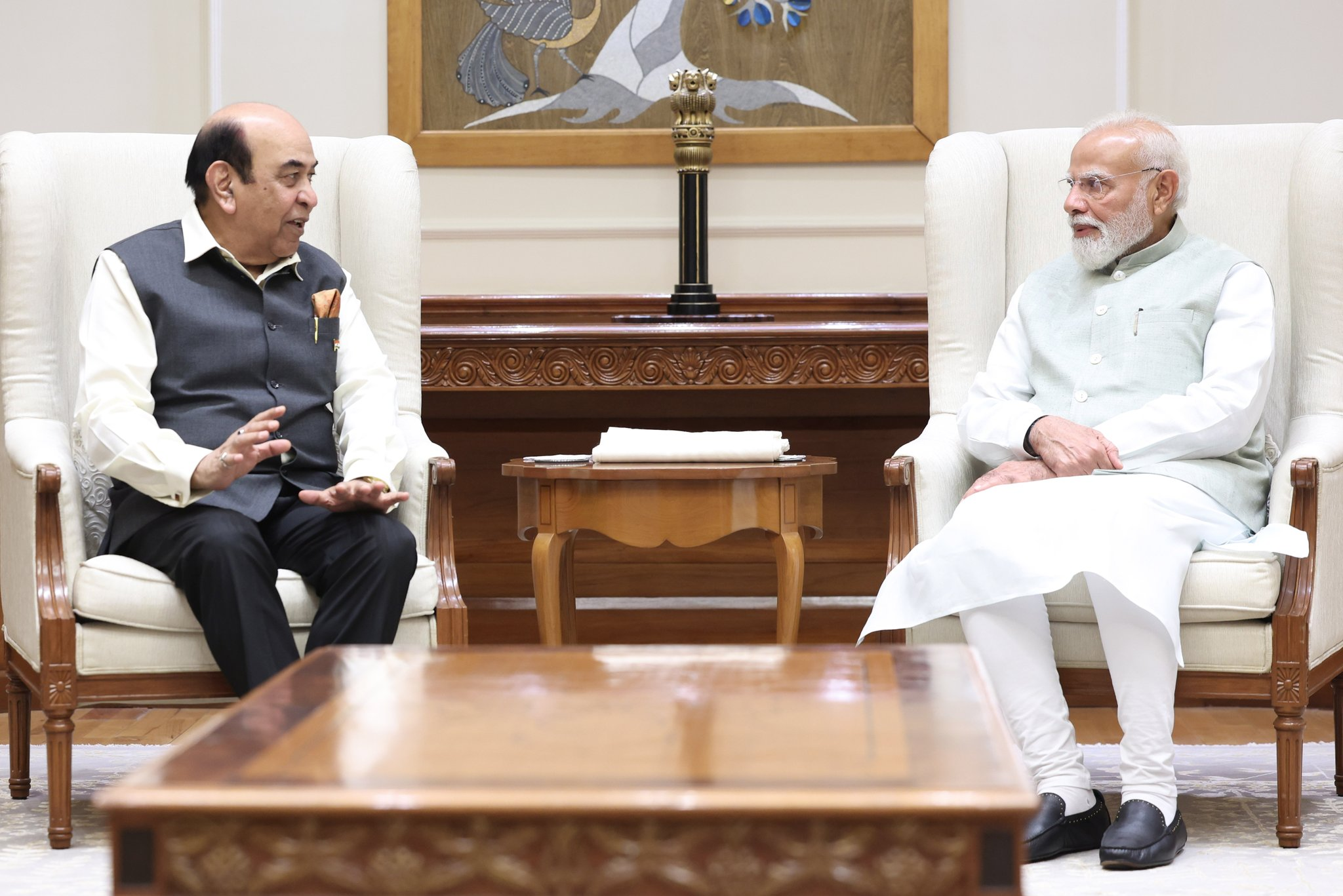

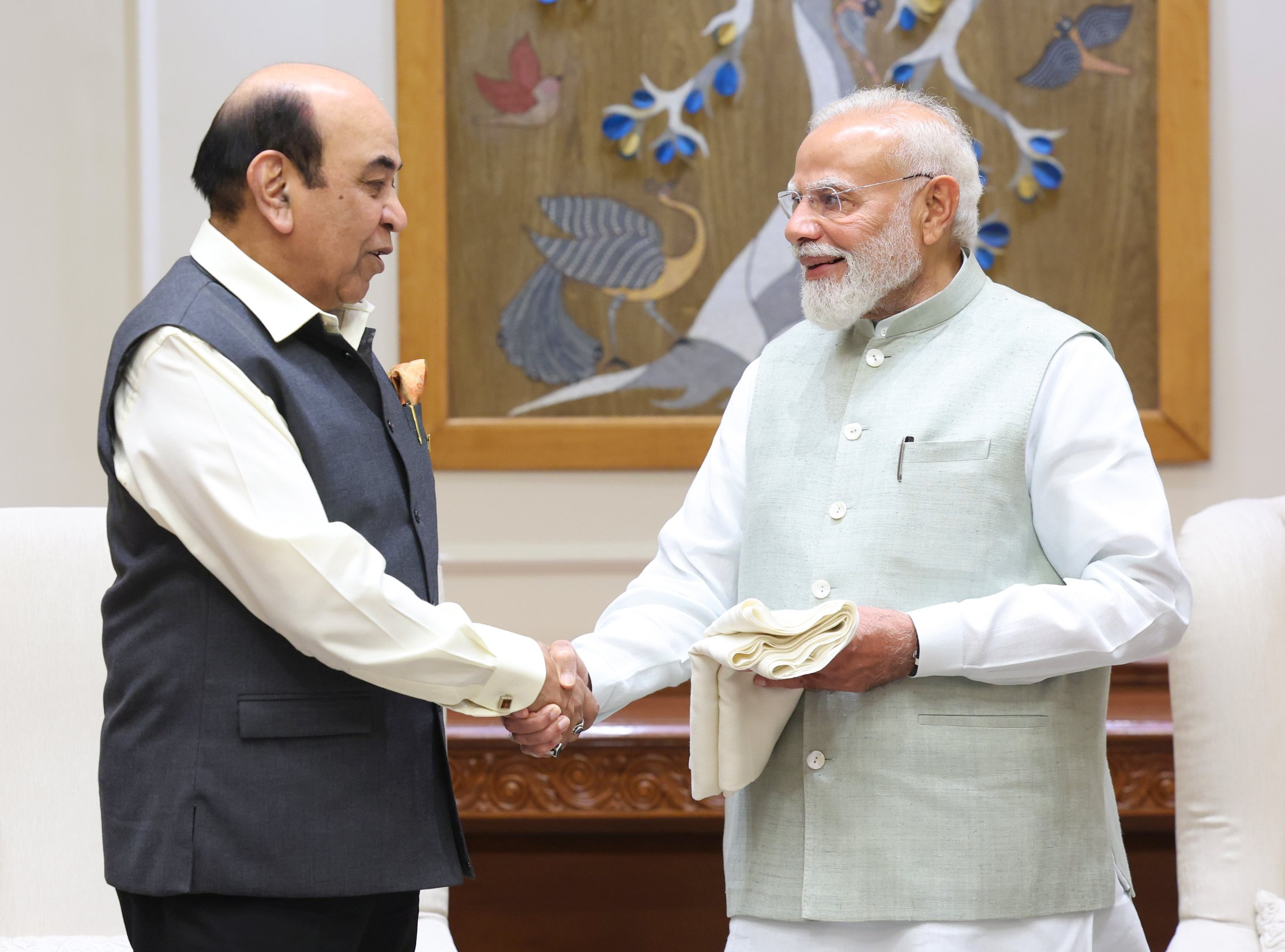
The Governor of Bihar, Syed Ata Hasnain meets PM Narendra Modi on 25 March 2026.

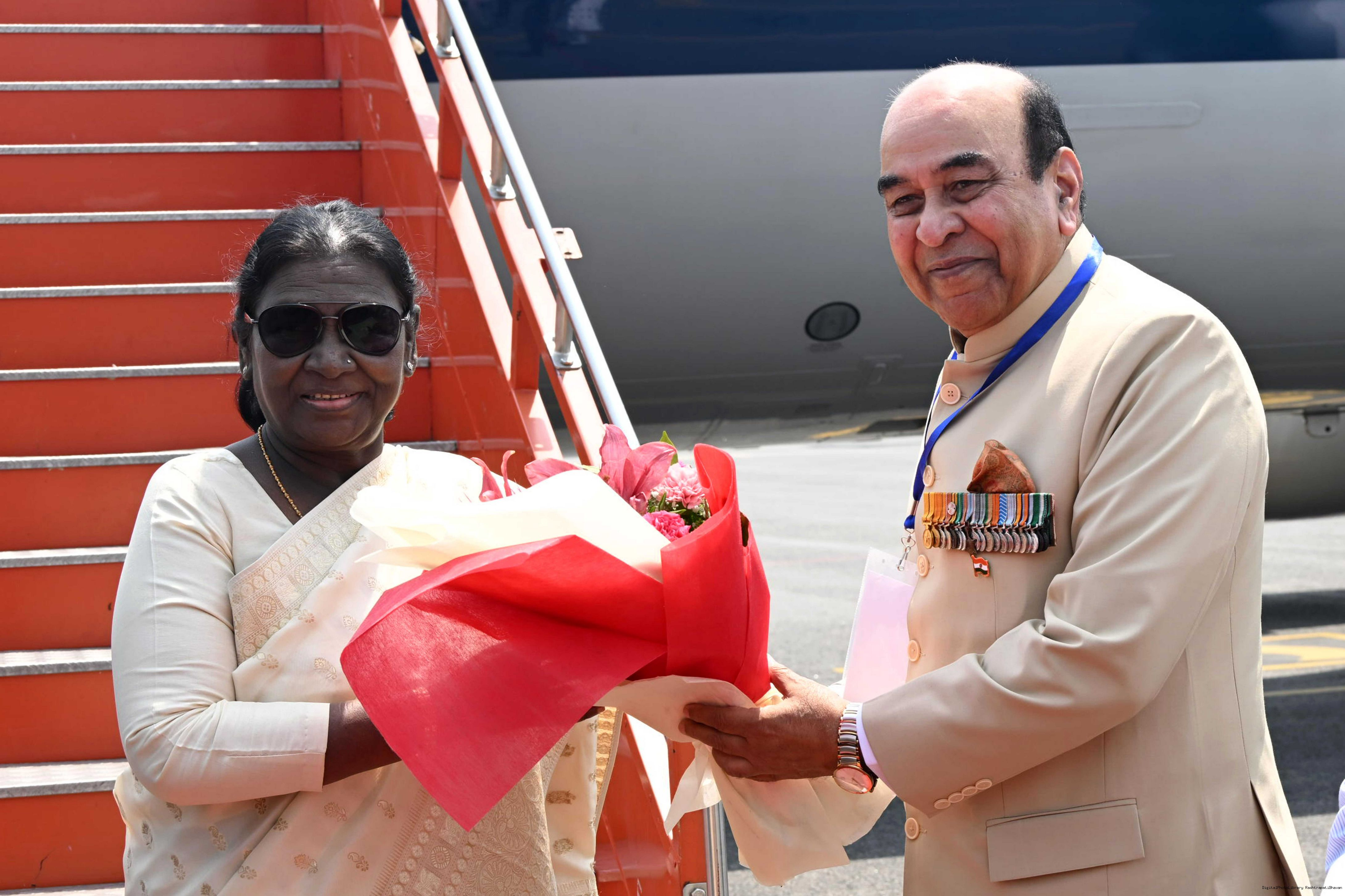
The Governor of Bihar, Syed Ata Hasnain meets President Droupadi Murmu on 31 March 2026.

=== Governor of Bihar (2026 - Incumbent) ===
On 5 March 2026, he was appointed as the Governor of Bihar replacing Arif Mohammad Khan by the order of the President of India, Droupadi Murmu. He was sworn in on 14 March 2026 by the-then Chief Justice of the Patna High Court, Sangam Kumar Sahoo. He met with President Droupadi Murmu and Prime Minister Narendra Modi on 25 March 2026 as his first meeting with them since taking oath. Prior to this, he met Vice President C. P. Radhakrishnan on 24 March 2026. He swore the new government formed in Bihar led by Chief Minister Samrat Choudhary following the resignation of then Chief Minister Nitish Kumar for his nomination to the Rajya Sabha on 14–15 April 2026. Later, Hasnain swore in various Chief Justices of the Patna High Court. In June - July 2026, he was invited for the funeral of Late Ali Khamenei, the former Supreme Leader of Iran.

== Awards and decorations ==
Hasnain was awarded the Vishisht Seva Medal, a bar to the Vishisht Seva Medal in 2003, the Sena Medal in 2005, the Ati Vishisht Seva Medal in 2009, the Uttam Yudh Seva Medal in 2012 and the Param Vishisht Seva Medal in 2013.

Param Vishisht Seva Medal	Uttam Yudh Seva Medal	Ati Vishisht Seva Medal	Sena Medal
Vishisht Seva Medal (Bar)	Samanya Seva Medal	Operation Vijay Star	Siachen Glacier Medal
Special Service Medal	Operation Vijay Medal	Operation Parakram Medal	Sainya Seva Medal
High Altitude Service Medal	Videsh Seva Medal	50th Anniversary of Independence Medal	30 Years Long Service Medal
20 Years Long Service Medal	9 Years Long Service Medal	UN Mission in Rwanda Medal	UN Mission in Middle East Medal

== Personal life ==
Gen. Hasnain is married to Sabiha Hasnain, who is a senior executive with a multinational company. They have two daughters. His elder brother, Raza Hasnain, is a retired IAS officer.

== See also ==
- Syed Mahdi Hasnain
- Lieutenant General Zameer Uddin Shah

Political offices
Preceded by Arif Mohammad Khan	Governor of Bihar; 2026 - Present	Incumbent
Military offices
Preceded by Rajinder Singh	General Officer Commanding XXI Corps; 2010 - 2010	Succeeded by Sanjiv Langer
Preceded by N. C. Marwah	General Officer Commanding XV Corps; 2010 - 2012	Succeeded by Om Prakash
