= Amardeep Singh Aujla =

Indian Army officer

Lieutenant General Amardeep Singh Aujla PVSM UYSM YSM SM VSM
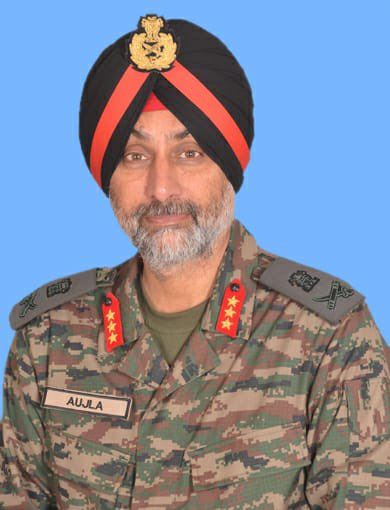
- Master General Sustenance & Colonel of the Rajputana Rifles Regiment
- Military career
- Allegiance: India
- Branch: Indian Army
- Service years: 19 December 1987 – Present
- Rank: Lieutenant General
- Unit: 13 Rajputana Rifles
- Commands: XV Corps; 28 Infantry Division; 268 Infantry Brigade; 15 Rajputana Rifles
- Awards: Param Vishisht Seva Medal; Uttam Yudh Seva Medal; Yudh Seva Medal; Sena Medal; Vishisht Seva Medal

Lieutenant General Amardeep Singh Aujla, PVSM, UYSM, YSM, SM, VSM (born on 3 December 1966) is a serving General Officer of the Indian Army. He currently serves as the Master General Sustenance (MGS). He had earlier served as the General Officer Commanding (GOC) of the Srinagar-based Chinar Corps(XV).

== Early life and education ==
Lieutenant General Aujla hails from Mohali, Punjab, and is an alumnus of National Defence Academy, Pune and Indian Military Academy, Dehradun. He has attended highly regarded career courses including the Defence Services Staff College, Wellington, the Higher Command Course at Army War College, Mhow and National Defence College, New Delhi. He holds M Phil in Defence and Strategic Studies from Devi Ahilya University, Indore, and also from Madras University, Chennai.

== Career ==
Lieutenant General Aujla was commissioned into the 13th Battalion The Rajputana Rifles on 19 Dec 1987. The General has vast experience in Counter Insurgency Operations having served multiple times in Jammu and Kashmir. He has commanded the 15th Battalion The Rajputana Rifles in deserts, an Infantry Brigade, and an Infantry Division (Vajra Division) along the Line of Control in North Kashmir.

Lieutenant General Aujla has held numerous Instructional and Staff appointments which include two tenures as an instructor at the Commando Wing, The Infantry School, Belgaum and an instructor tenure at HQ IMTRAT, Bhutan, a tenure as Brigade Major of an Infantry Brigade during OP PARAKRAM, Colonel General Staff in a Corps HQ, Director Perspective Planning in IHQ of MoD (Army), Brigadier General Staff (Operations) at Chinar Corps, Brigadier Infantry (C) at Infantry Directorate, IHQ of MoD (Army) and Major General General Staff (MGGS Operations) at HQ Northern Command.

=== Commander, 268 Infantry Brigade ===
Lieutenant General Aujla commanded the 268 Infantry Brigade from 30 Dec 2013 to 15 Jun 2015. Numerous successful operations were conducted under his stewardship leading to the establishment of complete dominance and absolute control along the line of Control while giving impetus to Defence Infrastructure development in an enormous manner.

=== General Officer Commanding 28 Infantry Division ===
Lieutenant General Aujla held the reins of 28 Infantry Division from 1 Nov 2019 to 3 Dec 2020. Under his leadership, a series of highly successful operations were executed, resulting in the firm establishment of total supremacy and unchallenged control along the Line of Control.

=== General Officer Commanding XV Corps ===
Lieutenant General Aujla assumed command of the prestigious XV Corps as the 51st General Officer Commanding on 10 May 2022. "Emphasizing the Essence of Ground Soldiership", he organized leadership to cater towards helping and communicating with soldiers.

=== Colonel of The Rajputana Rifles Regiment ===
Lieutenant General Aujla took over as the 19th Colonel of the Regiment of Rajputana Rifles on 1 May 2023 from Lt Gen CP Cariappa.

== Awards and decorations ==
Lieutenant General Aujla was awarded the Param Vishisht Seva Medal in 2025, Uttam Yudh Seva Medal in 2023, the Yudh Seva Medal in 2021, the Sena Medal in 2019, the Vishisht Seva Medal in 2016 and the COAS and GOC-in-C Commendation Card for his service.

Param Vishist Seva Medal	Uttam Yudh Seva Medal	Yudh Seva Medal	Sena Medal
Vishisht Seva Medal	Samanya Seva Medal	Special Service Medal	Operation Parakram Medal
Sainya Seva Medal	High Altitude Medal	Videsh Seva Medal	75th Independence Anniversary Medal
50th Independence Anniversary Medal	30 Years Long Service Medal	20 Years Long Service Medal	9 Years Long Service Medal

Military offices
Preceded by Devendra Pratap Pandey	General Officer Commanding XV Corps; 2022-2023	Succeeded by Rajiv Ghai
