= Syed Mahdi Hasnain =

Indian general

Major General Syed Mahdi Hasnain PVSM
- Relatives: Lieutenant General Syed Ata Hasnain (Son)
- Military career
- Allegiance: British India; India
- Branch: British Indian Army; Indian Army
- Rank: Major General
- Unit: 1 Garhwal Rifles
- Commands: 20 Mountain Division; 4 Garhwal Rifles
- Awards: Param Vishisht Seva Medal

Major General Syed Mahdi Hasnain, PVSM was a former General officer of the Indian Army. He was the raising commanding officer of the 4th Battalion, The Garhwal Rifles. He was commissioned in the British Indian Army in the 1st Royal Garhwal Rifles in 1941.

== Early life and education ==
He obtained his Master of Arts (MA) in History and LLB from the University of Lucknow.

== Military career ==
He was commissioned into the Indian Army in 1941, as a Second lieutenant in the Royal Garhwal Battalion (now Garhwal Rifles). After commission, he participated in the Second World War, during which his battalion was deployed in the Burma campaign for the liberation of Burma from the Japanese forces. After Burma, he went with his battalion to Sumatra (Indonesia) to repulse the Japanese invasion.

After the war in November 1946, his battalion was posted in Peshawar, the capital of the North West Frontier Province. In 1947 after the Partition of India, he chose to remain in India and serve in the Indian Army, even though both his elder and younger brothers had chosen to move to Pakistan. While moving back to India, he and his battalion saved over 1000 non-Muslim refugees who were being attacked by locals and brought them safely to India.

In 1959, as a Lieutenant colonel, he raised the 4 Garhwal Rifles battalion and became its commanding officer. Then in 1966, he went on to raise the 115 Infantry Brigade and became its first Brigade Commander. He then commanded the Indian Army's 20 Mountain Division. In the last, he held the post of Director-General, Infantry at Army Headquarters, New Delhi till his retirement on 27 January 1972.

== Children ==
His son Syed Ata Hasnain was also a general officer in the Indian Army, who later became Governor of the Indian state of Bihar. His other son, Raza, was an officer of the Indian Administrative Service, who retired early, and is working in the corporate sector.

== Dates of rank ==
Insignia	Rank	Component	Date of rank
	Viceroy's Commissioned Officer	British Indian Army	26 February 1941
	Second Lieutenant	British Indian Army	28 February 1943 (emergency)
	Lieutenant	British Indian Army	28 August 1943 (war-substantive); 28 February 1944 (substantive)
	Lieutenant	Indian Army	15 August 1947 (Note: Upon independence in 1947, India became a Dominion within the British Commonwealth of Nations. As a result, the rank insignia of the British Army, incorporating the Tudor Crown and four-pointed Bath Star ("pip"), was retained, as George VI remained Commander-in-Chief of the Indian Armed Forces. After 26 January 1950, when India became a republic, the President of India became Commander-in-Chief, and the Ashoka Lion replaced the crown, with a five-pointed star being substituted for the "pip.")
	Captain	Indian Army	28 February 1949 (substantive)
	Captain	Indian Army	26 January 1950 (recommissioning and change in insignia)
	Major	Indian Army	28 February 1956
	Lieutenant-Colonel	Indian Army	
	Colonel	Indian Army	22 December 1965
	Brigadier	Indian Army	5 October 1967 (substantive)
	Major General	Indian Army	3 June 1969 (acting); 2 February 1970 (substantive)
