= Jaswinder Singh Sandhu (general) =

Lieutenant General Jaswinder Singh Sandhu PVSM, UYSM, AVSM, VSM
- Military career
- Allegiance: India
- Branch: Indian Army
- Rank: Lieutenant General
- Service number: IC-38753W
- Unit: 5 Gorkha Rifles
- Commands: XV Corps; 28 Infantry Division
- Awards: Param Vishisht Seva Medal; Uttam Yudh Seva Medal; Ati Vishisht Seva Medal; Vishisht Seva Medal

Lieutenant General Jaswinder Singh Sandhu, PVSM, UYSM, AVSM, VSM was the Military Secretary of the Indian Army and assumed office on 1 February 2018. He was the 46th Commander, XV Corps of the Indian Army and was in office from 1 November 2016 to 31 January 2018. He assumed the post from Lt General Satish Dua and was succeeded by Lt General Anil Kumar Bhatt.

== Early life and education ==
Sandhu has attended the Higher Command Course at Army War College, Mhow; Defence Services Staff College, Wellington; and National Defence College, Delhi.

== Career ==
Sandhu was commissioned into 5 Gorkha Rifles. He has held various important command, staff and instructor appointments during his career. He has commanded an infantry battalion along the Line of Control; a mountain brigade and the 28th Infantry Division (Kupwara). He has a keen understanding of Jammu and Kashmir because he has served five times in the state. He has also served in the Indian Embassy at Kathmandu, Nepal.

During his career of over 36 years, he has been awarded the Vishist Seva Medal, Ati Vishisht Seva Medal (2015), Uttam Yudh Seva Medal (January 2018), and Param Vishisht Seva Medal in 2019. for his service.

== Honours and decorations ==

Param Vishisht Seva Medal	Uttam Yudh Seva Medal		Ati Vishisht Seva Medal
Vishisht Seva Medal	Special Service Medal	Siachen Glacier Medal	Operation Vijay Medal
Operation Parakram Medal	Sainya Seva Medal	High Altitude Service Medal	Videsh Seva Medal
50th Anniversary of Independence Medal	30 Years Long Service Medal	20 Years Long Service Medal	9 Years Long Service Medal

Military offices
Preceded by Satish Dua	General Officer Commanding XV Corps; 1 November 2016 – 14 December 2017	Succeeded by Anil Kumar Bhatt
