= Indian Heaven Premier League =

Cricket League in India

- Official logo
- Countries: India
- Administrator: Yuva Society
- Format: Twenty20
- First edition: 2025
- Tournament format: Round-robin league and Playoffs
- Number of teams: 8
- Website: ihplt20.com

The Indian Heaven Premier League (IHPL) was a professional Twenty20 cricket league based in Srinagar, Jammu and Kashmir, India. Established and collapsed in 2025, it was organised by the Yuva Society and features eight franchise-based teams representing various regions of Jammu and Kashmir.

The inaugural season, themed "Valley of Cricket, Spirit of India", commenced on 25 October at Bakshi Stadium and was scheduled to conclude on 8 November 2025, but collapsed midway through amid a major financial scandal involving unpaid wages, player strandings, and an ongoing police investigation.

The Yuva Society, a non-profit organisation focused on youth development, serves as the primary administrator, with mentorship from former Indian wicketkeeper Surinder Khanna. The league emphasises 50% local player selection through open trials across districts such as Doda, Kishtwar, and Pulwama, aiming to bridge grassroots cricket with professional opportunities.

Preparations for the 2025 season included directives from the Divisional Commissioner to ensure online ticketing for all matches, promoting transparency and accessibility. The event has been positioned as a catalyst for cricket tourism, drawing international attention to the Kashmir Valley.

== Collapse ==
The league, which is not affiliated with the Board of Control for Cricket in India (BCCI) or Jammu and Kashmir Cricket Association (JKCA), promised players up to ₹3 lakh per match and significant prize money.

By late October, players reported non-payment and lack of facilities. Matches scheduled for 1–2 November were cancelled due to "technical issues", leaving international and local players stranded. On 2 November, organisers reportedly fled Srinagar overnight, owing an estimated ₹80–90 lakh to hotels, caterers, transport providers, and staff.

On 3 November, Jammu and Kashmir Police registered an FIR at Rajbagh Police Station under charges of cheating and breach of trust, initiating a probe to trace the organisers and examine financial transactions. The Bharatiya Janata Party's Kashmir unit condemned the incident as a "fraud that has embarrassed Kashmir". The collapse raised concerns over transparency and player welfare in privately run cricket leagues.

The scandal also led to repercussions within the Delhi and District Cricket Association (DDCA), which sacked Ashu Dani, chairman of its junior selection committee and president of the IHPL, due to his involvement in the unsanctioned league. The DDCA also announced it would review the role of former India wicketkeeper Surinder Khanna, a member of its cricket advisory committee (CAC) and mentor for the league, before involving him in future activities. In response, the DDCA issued a circular reminding stakeholders to avoid unauthorised cricket events and disclose potential conflicts of interest.

== Format ==
The IHPL follows a single round-robin format in the league stage, with each of the eight teams playing five matches. The top four teams advance to the playoffs, consisting of two semi-finals and a final. All matches are played using the Twenty20 format. The tournament includes 32 international players across the franchises, ensuring a mix of experience and emerging talent.

The eight franchises represent key regions and landmarks in Jammu and Kashmir. Each team consists of a mix of international, domestic, and local players, with squads assembled through auctions and trials.

== 2025 Season ==
The 2025 season, the league's debut edition, began on 25 October 2025. It was scheduled to feature 29 matches, with the final planned to be played on 8 November. International stars such as Chris Gayle (Pulwama Titans) and Shakib Al Hasan (Uri Panthers) headlined the player pool. In the season opener on 25 October 2025, Gulmarg Royals defeated Uri Panthers by 37 runs.
