= Jammu & Kashmir Cricket Association =

Governing body for cricket in Jammu and Kashmir, India

Jammu and Kashmir Cricket Association
- Sport: Cricket
- Jurisdiction: Jammu and Kashmir, India
- Abbreviation: JKCA
- Founded: 1970; 56 years ago
- Affiliation: Board of Control for Cricket in India
- Affiliation date: 1970
- Headquarters: Jammu Office: GGM Science College Hostel Ground, Jammu.; Srinagar Office: Sher-i-Kashmir Stadium, Srinagar.
- Location: Jammu and Srinagar

Official website
- jkca.tv

Jammu and Kashmir Cricket Association (JKCA) is an organisation that governs and manages cricket in the Indian union territory of Jammu and Kashmir. It fields the Jammu and Kashmir cricket team in the Ranji Trophy domestic tournament. It is a member of the Board of Control for Cricket in India.

JKCA's home ground is the Sher-i-Kashmir Stadium in Srinagar, which has held One Day International matches in the past. The association is currently constructing an indoor academy at the stadium, which is also its headquarters.

JKCA is registered with J&K Registrar of Societies. In its constitution, all the districts of Jammu and Kashmir are given equal representation in voting.

== Administration ==
Presently, JKCA is run by a three members sub-committee appointed by the Board of Control for Cricket In India. The Committee consists of following:

1. Brig. Anil Gupta (Member Administration),
2. Vidya Bhaskar (Member Cricket Operations & Development)

== Jammu and Kashmir Cricket Association Scam 2011-12 ==
Between 2011 and 2012, the Board of Control for Cricket in India (BCCI) had given Rs 112 crore for promotion of cricket in Jammu and Kashmir. It has been alleged that there has been a misappropriation of Rs 46.3 crore by the accused.

In 2015, a Public Interest litigation (PIL) was filed by two cricketers - Majid Yaqoob Dar and Nissar Ahmad Khan - into the alleged scam in the JKCA that had surfaced in 2012, following which the account of the JKCA remained frozen.

The case was subsequently handed over to the CBI, to investigate the alleged embezzlement of funds in the cricket association which was headed by Farooq Abdullah. National Conference assured complete cooperation on behalf of its chief, Farooq Abdullah, after the latter was chargesheeted by the Central Bureau of Investigation (CBI) in connection with the Jammu and Kashmir Cricket Association (JKCA) scam.

== Tournaments ==
- Kashmir Premier League (KPL)
- Jammu Premier (JPL)
- Jammu and Kashmir Premier League (JKPL)
- Kathua Premier League (KPL)
- Indian Heaven Premier League (IHPL)

== Home ground ==
- Sher-i-Kashmir Stadium, Srinagar - Hosted 2 ODI
- Maulana Azad Stadium, Jammu - Hosted one ODI
- Gandhi Memorial Science College Ground, Jammu

== Notable players ==
- Mithun Manhas - He is a player in the Indian Premier League. Represented the Delhi Daredevils in the fourth season of IPL. In the seventh season of the Indian Premier League, he was contracted by the Chennai Super Kings .
- Ian Dev Singh - He is the highest run scorer for J&K in Ranji Trophy and T20s.He has played the highest number of matches for J&K in Ranji Trophy. He also played domestic cricket in Sri Lanka becoming the only International First class player from JKCA. He has played for India Green, Indian Board President's XI, Jammu & Kashmir, Kandy Customs Cricket Club, North Zone, Rest of India. He scored 145 in his debut match for North Zone in Duleep Trophy becoming the First in the state to score century in Duleep Trophy debut. Ian Dev Singh
- Abid Nabi - Considered one of the fastest bowlers in India. Abid represented Delhi Giants in the Indian Cricket League. Considered to be one of the fastest in India, Abid was however unlucky to miss senior national cap.
- Parvez Rasool - Rasool was a standout performer for Jammu & Kashmir in the 2012-13 Ranji Trophy, ending the season as its top scorer and highest wicket-taker. In his seven Ranji matches, Rasool scored 594 runs at 54 with two centuries, and took 33 wickets at 18.09 to finish as the third-highest wicket-taker among spinners in the tournament. He was picked for the India A side to play England in a one-day practice match in Delhi, and made a mark when he picked up 7 for 45 for the Board President's XI against the visiting Australians in their tour-opener in Chennai in February 2013. He was then signed on by the Pune Warriors IPL franchise and was also named in the India probables for the Champions Trophy. Rasool belongs to a family of cricketers from the town of Bij Behara in the southern Kashmir valley district of Anantnag, and has represented the state right from the Under-14s level. His elder brother Asif had played two T20s for J&K in 2009, and his father opened the batting for Anantnag. When Rasool was selected for that India A side which played England in a warm-up, he became the first cricketer from J&K to be selected in an Indian team to play an international side, and the fourth - behind Abid Nabi, Surendra Singh and Abdul Qayoom - to be picked in a national-level squad. When he signed with Pune Warriors, he was the first player from J&K to receive an IPL contract. In July 2013, he was rewarded with his first national call-up, for the ODI tour of Zimbabwe.

== See also ==
- Sports in India
- Sports in Jammu and Kashmir
- Jammu and Kashmir Cricket Team
