= Sarabjit Singh Dhillon =

Lieutenant General Sarabjit Singh Dhillon was a senior general of the Indian Army, he was the commander of 15 Corps of Jammu and Kashmir in 2005, and also the Master General of the Ordnance of the Indian Army. He is a veteran of the Indo-Pakistani War of 1971 and has held several important command and staff appointments at various levels of his career.

An alumnus of the Indian Military Academy in Dehradun, the National Defence Academy, Lt Gen Dhillon was commissioned to the Grenadiers regiment in 1968. He attended the Defence Services Staff College, Wellington, senior and higher command courses at the Army War College, Mhow, and also the National Defence College in New Delhi. In May 2008 he was awarded the Param Vishisht Seva Medal by the President of India.

== BBC interview with General Dhillon ==
In an interview with the BBC General Dhillon stated, in 2005, that there had been more infiltration attempts made across the Line of Control (LoC) in Kashmir. Furthermore, "Gen Dhillon said the 740 km (460 mi) fence built by India to prevent infiltration had been a big help but said it was 'not an obstacle that no one can cross'."

== Military awards ==

Ati Vishist Seva Medal	Vishisht Seva Medal	Samanya Seva Medal	Paschimi Star
Special Service Medal	Sangram Medal	Operation Vijay Medal	Operation Parakram Medal
Sainya Seva Medal	High Altitude Service Medal	Videsh Seva Medal	50th Anniversary of Independence Medal
25th Anniversary of Independence Medal	30 Years Long Service Medal	20 Years Long Service Medal	9 Years Long Service Medal
