= Kanwal Jeet Singh Dhillon =

Retired Indian Army General

Lieutenant General K J S Dhillon PVSM, UYSM, YSM, VSM
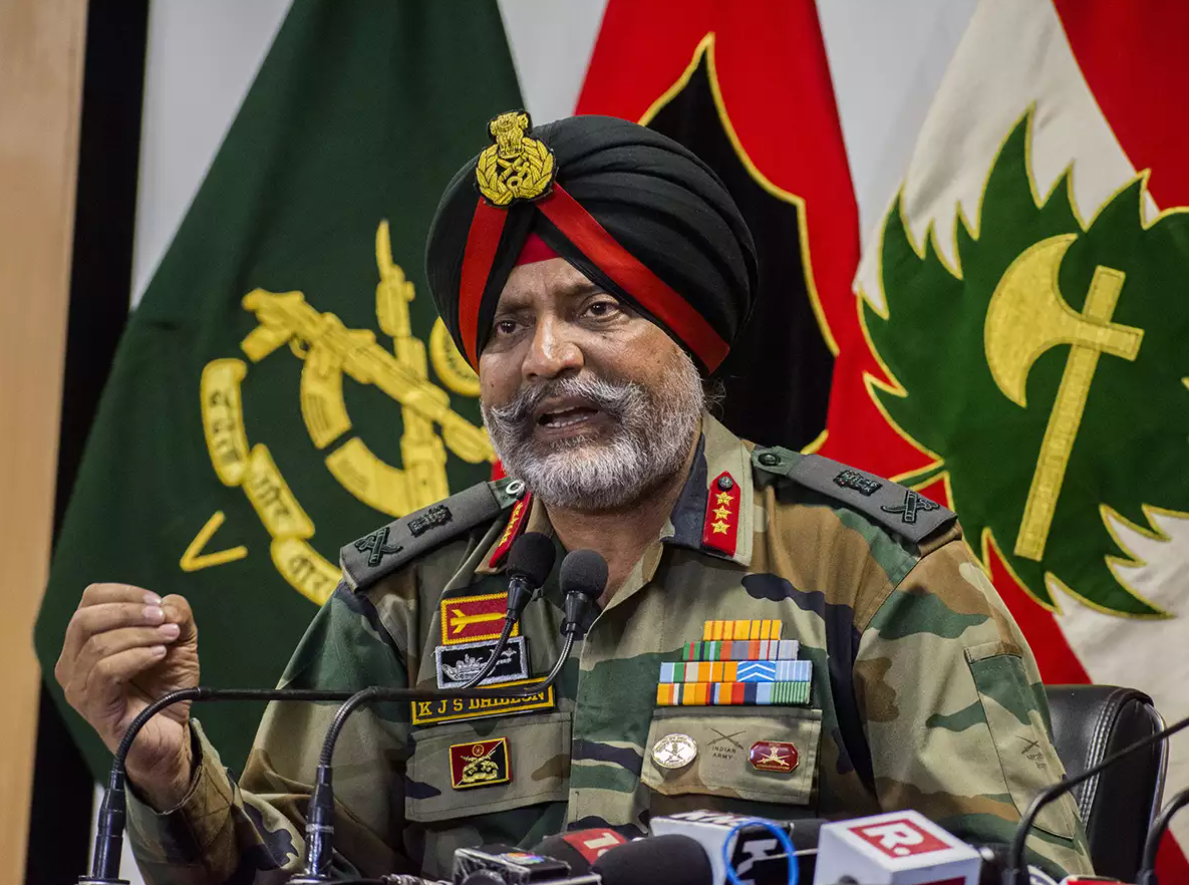
- Military career
- Allegiance: India
- Branch: Indian Army
- Service years: December 1983 – January 2022
- Rank: Lieutenant General
- Nickname: Tiny Dhillon
- Unit: 4 Rajputana Rifles
- Commands: XV Corps
- Awards: Param Vishisht Seva Medal; Uttam Yudh Seva Medal; Yudh Seva Medal; Vishisht Seva Medal
- Other work: Chairperson of the Board of Governors (BoG) of IIT Mandi

Lieutenant General Kanwal Jeet Singh Dhillon, PVSM, UYSM, YSM, VSM is a retired General Officer of the Indian Army and the chairperson of the Board of Governors (BoG) of IIT Mandi. He last served as the Director General Defence Intelligence Agency (DG DIA) and Deputy Chief of Integrated Defence Staff (Intelligence) (DCIDS Int) under the Chief of Defence Staff (CDS) from 9 March 2020 to 31 January 2022. Prior to this, he served as the 48th Commander of the XV Corps assuming the post from Lieutenant General Anil Kumar Bhatt.

== Early life and education ==
Dhillon is an alumnus of National Defence Academy, Khadakwasla & Indian Military Academy, Dehradun. He graduated from the Defence Services Staff College, Wellington, and the National Defence College, Delhi.

== Career ==
Dhillon was commissioned in December 1983 in 4'th Battalion of Rajputana Rifles and had a 39 year long military career. He is credited with important appointments at the Army Headquarters and instructional appointments at Infantry School, Mhow, and Indian Army training team abroad. He is considered an expert on Jammu and Kashmir, as he served there for five tenures since 1988, including as sector commander of Rashtriya Rifles and Brigadier General Staff of the Chinar Corps. Before taking over as the Chinar Corps Commander, the General Officer was tenanting the appointment of Director General Perspective Planning. He was appointed as the Colonel of the Regiment of Rajputana Rifles on 21 September 2019, when he took over from Lt Gen Abhay Krishna. He retired from Service on 31 January 2022 and was succeeded by Lt Gen CP Cariappa as the Colonel of Regiment of Rajputana Rifles.

== As XV Corps commander ==
He has successfully maintained a balance, in Kashmir's security scenario, between counter-infiltration and counter-terrorist operations on one hand and the use of military soft power on the other. The perpetrators of Pulwama Blast were targeted in the first 100 hours. In an official statement on this, he described his efforts against terror launch pads especially, "after August 5 last year", as the statement read.

== Awards and decorations ==
During his military career of 39 years, he has been awarded with the Param Vishisht Seva Medal, Uttam Yudh Seva Medal, Yudh Seva Medal, and the Vishisht Seva Medal.

Param Vishist Seva Medal	Uttam Yudh Seva Medal		Yudh Seva Medal
Vishisht Seva Medal	Samanya Seva Medal	Special Service Medal	Operation Vijay Medal
Operation Parakram Medal	Sainya Seva Medal	High Altitude Service Medal	Videsh Seva Medal
50th Anniversary of Independence Medal	30 Years Long Service Medal	20 Years Long Service Medal	9 Years Long Service Medal

== Later career ==
Dhillon was appointed as the chairperson of the Board of Governors (BoG) of Indian Institute of Technology, Mandi, on 25 August 2023 for a period of three years. Dhillon will succeed Professor Prem Vrat, the founding director of IIT Roorkee, in the position.

== Books ==
- Kitne Ghazi Aaye, Kitne Ghazi Gaye: My Life Story
- Wafadari, Imaandari, Zimmedari (WIZ): War-room to Board-room

Military offices
Preceded by Anil Kumar Bhatt	General Officer Commanding XV Corps; 9 February 2019 – 29 February 2020	Succeeded by B. S. Raju
Preceded by	Director General of Perspective Planning	Succeeded by
