= Sher-e-Kashmir Stadium =

Cricket stadium in Srinagar, India

- Interactive map of Sher-e-Kashmir Stadium

Ground information
- Location: Srinagar, J&K, India
- Country: India
- Coordinates: 34°4′19.30″N 74°50′4.92″E
- Establishment: 1983
- Capacity: 5,000
- Owner: JKCA
- Operator: Jammu and Kashmir Cricket Association
- Tenants: Indian Cricket Team; J&K Cricket Team (1983-)
- End names
- n/a n/a

International information
- First men's ODI: 13 October 1983: India v West Indies
- Last men's ODI: 9 September 1986: India v Australia
- As of 31 March 2014; Source: Sher-i-Kashmir Stadium, Cricinfo

Sher-e-Kashmir Stadium is a cricket stadium located in the Sonwar Bagh neighbourhood of Srinagar in the Indian union territory of Jammu and Kashmir. It is home to the Jammu and Kashmir Cricket Association and the Jammu and Kashmir cricket team which represents the Indian union territory of Jammu and Kashmir in the Ranji Trophy and other domestic tournaments in the country. National Cricket Academy is currently constructing an indoor complex at the stadium.

== International cricket ==
The venue has hosted two One Day International matches. In the first match India played West Indies on 13 October 1983. India batted first, but the match was affected due to the protests by Kashmiri Dambali from Handwara digging the pitch during the lunch interval.Some people from the gallery chanted anti-India rhetoric in this match.When the match resumed, rain and dust storms affected the play, and India scored 176 all out. West Indies scored 108 for no loss in 22.4 overs before rain ended play, and West Indies were declared winners as the revised target was 81 in 22 overs. Desmond Haynes (West Indies), who scored 55 not out, was named Man of the Match.

In the second match India took on Australia on 9 September 1986.This match was also disturbed by hostile protests from the audience.India batted first, and a superb 52 off 56 balls by Sunil Gavaskar helped India score 222 for 8. In reply Australia achieved the target with 3 wickets in hand and 6 balls to go. Allan Border scored 90 not out off 106 balls and was named Man of the Match.

== Use by the security forces and other activities ==
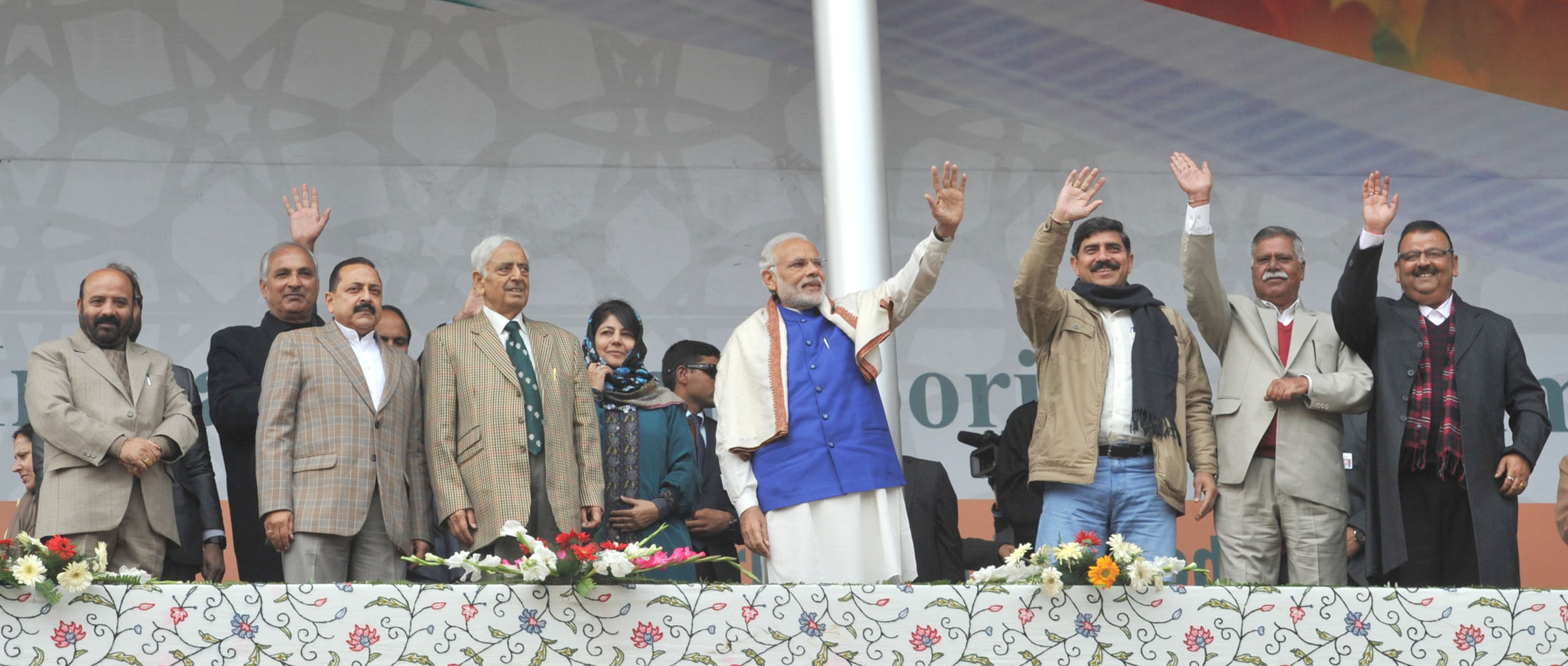
Prime Minister Narendra Modi at the public meeting at Sher-e-Kashmir cricket stadium, in Srinagar on 7 November 2015

The venue was occupied by the Central Reserve Police Force (CRPF) for 18 years during which the city has seen a lot of militant violence.

The National Conference held a special session at Sher-i-Kashmir Stadium in 2002 to elect a new president. In 2003, then Prime Minister of India, Atal Bihari Vajpayee addressed a rally at the ground which was attended by 20,000 people. On 7 November 2015, Prime Minister Narendra Modi addressed a public rally at Sher-e-Kashmir cricket stadium, in Srinagar. The Chief Minister of Jammu and Kashmir, Mufti Mohammad Sayeed was also present.

== Revamp ==
In November 2007, the CRPF decided to vacate the venue. The Jammu and Kashmir Cricket Association has planned to renovate the stadium. First-class cricket resumed there in 2009. The Final of 2021 Kashmir Premier League (India) was played between Badgam Braves and Shahi Shopian at Sher-i-Kashmir Stadium, Srinagar on 29 August 2021.

== Name change proposal ==
There has been talk of changing the name of the stadium to "Sardar Vallabhbhai Patel Stadium". However this has not been implemented by the government.
