= Satish Dua =

Indian Army

Lieutenant General Satish Dua PVSM, UYSM, SM, VSM
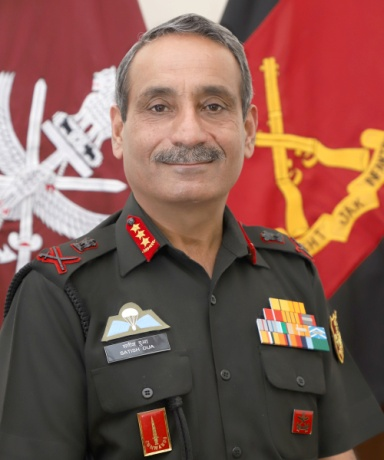
- Military career
- Allegiance: India
- Branch: Indian Army
- Service years: December 1979 – October 2018
- Rank: Lieutenant General
- Service number: IC-38311X
- Unit: 8 Jammu and Kashmir Light Infantry
- Commands: Integrated Defence Staff; XV Corps; IGAR (East); 8 Jammu and Kashmir Light Infantry
- Awards: Param Vishisht Seva Medal; Uttam Yudh Seva Medal; Sena Medal; Vishisht Seva Medal

Lieutenant General Satish Dua, PVSM, UYSM, SM, VSM is a retired General Officer of Indian Army. He served as Chief of Integrated Defence Staff to the Chairman of the Chiefs of Staff Committee (CISC) of the Indian Armed Forces and the Former 15 Corps (XV Corps) in Kashmir. The General Officer was the Kashmir Corps Commander during the 'surgical strike' in September 2016. He was the Colonel of Jammu and Kashmir Light Infantry Regiment.

== Early life and education ==
Dua has attended Higher Command Course at Army War College, Mhow; Defence Services Staff College, Wellington; and National Defence College, Delhi.. He also attended National Defence Academy and Indian Military Academy.

== Career ==
Dua was commissioned into 8 Jammu and Kashmir Light Infantry (Siachen) in December 1979. He has held various command, staff and Instructor appointments during his career. He has commanded a battalion and a brigade in counter terrorism operations in Jammu and Kashmir and the XV Corps (Srinagar) (2015-2016). As a Major General in Assam Rifles he was involved in raising a new formation termed IGAR (East) in Northeast India. He has held various staff appointments including Colonel MS (Complaints) in Military Secretary Branch; Brigade Major of Kargil Brigade; Brigadier General Staff (Operations) of XVI Corps (Nagrota); Deputy Director General in Weapon Equipment Directorate; Additional Director General (Procurement) in Master General of Ordnance Branch. He has also served as a commando instructor and a Defence Attaché to Vietnam, Cambodia and Laos (2005-2008). He was Colonel of Jammu and Kashmir Light Infantry Regiment.

Lieutenant General Satish Dua was the founding Member Secretary of Defence Planning Committee.

As member of Defence Acquisition Council, he played a pivotal role in force modernisation & inter se prioritisation between Army, Navy & Air Force. He worked actively in the field of Humanitarian Assistance & Disaster Relief. As a member of National Crisis Management Group, coordinated the efforts of Army, Navy & Air Force in National Crises & Disaster situations.

Lieutenant General Satish Dua co-chaired the INDO-U.S. Military Cooperation Group (2016-2018)

During his career, he has been awarded the Vishisht Seva Medal, Sena Medal, the Uttam Yudh Seva Medal (2017) and Param Vishisht Seva Medal (2018) for his service.

After retirement, General Dua has authored a book titled 'India’s Bravehearts'. This book tells first hand experiences and gripping stories of death-defying operations and daring surgical strikes, the intense training soldiers have to undergo to become battle-fit, what life is really like on the LoC and the lives of the young men who made the ultimate sacrifice for their country.

== Honours and decorations ==

| Param Vishisht Seva Medal | | Uttam Yudh Seva Medal | |
| Sena Medal | Vishisht Seva Medal | | Special Service Medal |
| Operation Vijay Medal | Operation Parakram Medal | Sainya Seva Medal | High Altitude Service Medal |
| 50th Anniversary of Independence Medal | 30 Years Long Service Medal | 20 Years Long Service Medal | 9 Years Long Service Medal |

== Bibliography ==
- Dua, Satish (2020). India's Bravehearts : Untold Stories from the Indian Army. Noida, Uttarpradesh, India: Juggernaut (4 December 2020); HarperCollins India Private Limited, A-75, Sector 57, Noida, Uttarpradesh - 201301, Tel no : 0120-4044800. p. 224.

Military offices
| Preceded by Air Marshal P P Reddy | Chief Of Integrated Defence Staff; 31 October 2016 – 31 October 2018 | Succeeded by Lt Gen P S Rajeshwar |
| Preceded by Subrata Saha | General Officer Commanding XV Corps; 26 November 2015 – 30 October 2016 | Succeeded by Jaswinder Singh Sandhu |
