= Devendra Pratap Pandey =

Indian army general (born 1964)

Lieutenant General Devendra Pratap Pandey PVSM UYSM AVSM VSM
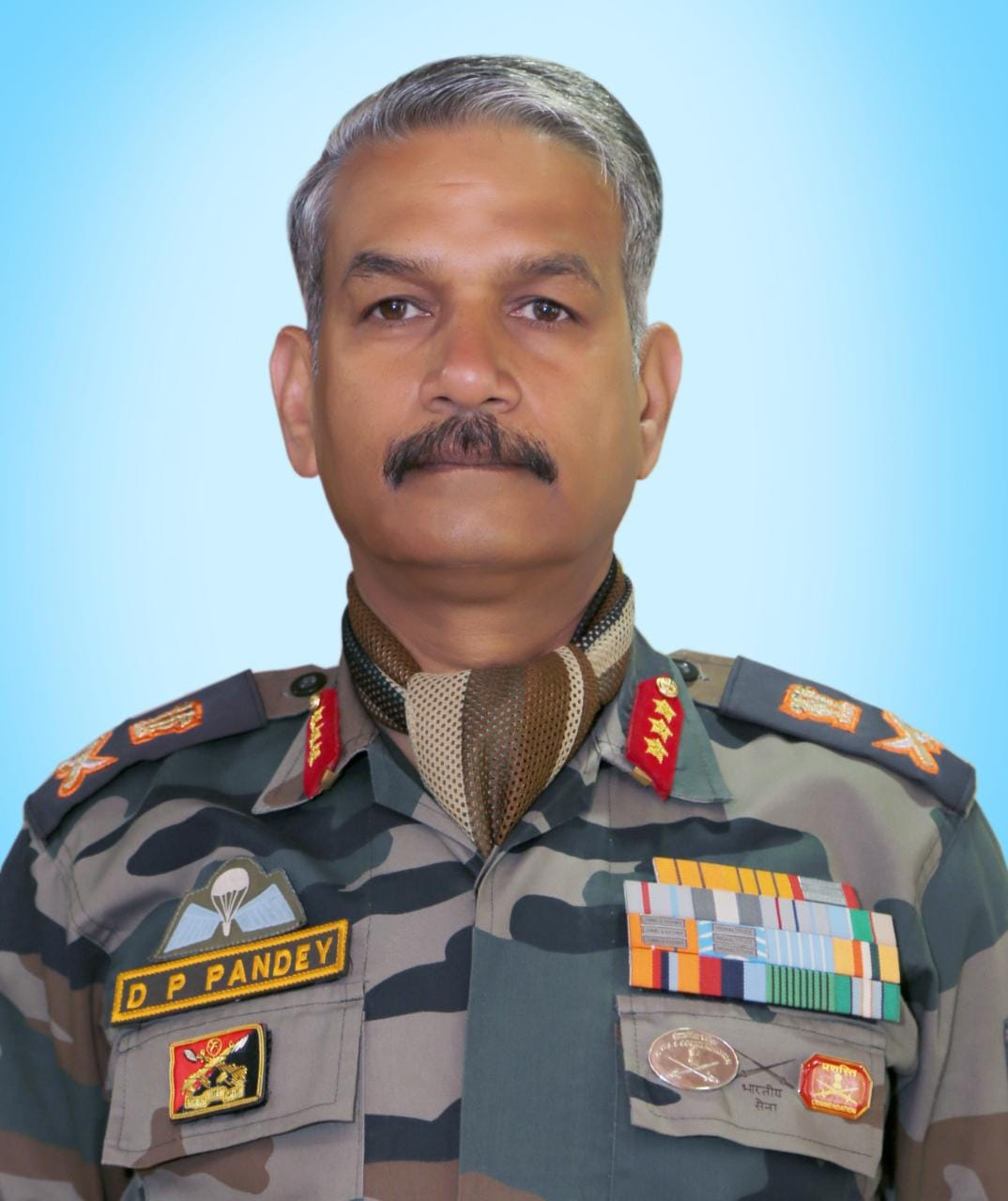

Commandant, Army War College Mhow
- In office 10 May 2022 – 22 August 2023
- Preceded by: VS Srinivasan
- Succeeded by: Lt Gen Harjit Singh sahi

General Officer Commanding XV Corps
- In office 18 March 2021 – 9 May 2022
- Preceded by: B. S. Raju
- Succeeded by: Amardeep Singh Aujla

Personal details
- Born: 17 June 1964 (age 62) Gorakhpur, Uttar Pradesh, India

Military service
- Allegiance: India
- Branch/service: Indian Army
- Years of service: 14 December 1985 – 30 June 2024
- Rank: Lieutenant General
- Unit: 9 Sikh Light Infantry
- Commands: XV Corps; Kilo Force; 9 SikhLI
- Service number: IC-43285L
- Awards: Param Vishisht Seva Medal; Uttam Yudh Seva Medal; Ati Vishisht Seva Medal; Vishisht Seva Medal

Lieutenant General Devendra Pratap Pandey (born 17 June 1964) PVSM, UYSM, AVSM, VSM is a retired general officer of the Indian Army. He was the Commandant of the Army War College, Mhow. He previously served as the General Officer Commanding of the Srinagar based Chinar Corps(XV) succeeding Lieutenant General B. S. Raju after the latter completed his term as the Corps Commander. Prior to his appointment as the Chinar Corps Commander, the general served as the first Director General of Territorial Army of the Indian Army.

== Early life and education ==
Devendra Pratap Pandey hails from Gorakhpur and is an alumnus of St Mary's Carmel, Kendriya Vidyalaya Airforce Station, Gorakhpur, Kendriya Vidyalaya, IIT New Delhi and National Defence Academy, Khadakwasla, Pune and Indian Military Academy, Dehradun. He also holds a master's degree in defence studies from University of Madras, Chennai and an M.Phil. in defence and management studies from Devi Ahilya Vishwavidyalaya, Indore. He has also attended the Defence Services Staff College, Wellington, and the National Defense University in Washington, D.C.

== Military career ==
He was commissioned into 9th battalion The Sikh Light Infantry on 14 December 1985. He has served in Counter-insurgency operations in Jammu and Kashmir. Qualified in high altitude warfare courses, he has commanded the 9th battalion The Sikh Light Infantry in north Siachen glacier and chushul sector of Eastern Ladakh. He also commanded a RR Sector. He also served as a military observer in Cambodia.

Gen Pandey has held numerous staff assignments which include a tenure as Brigade major of an infantry brigade in high-altitude area during operation Vijay (Kargil) and as a director in Infantry Directorate and also Director, Foreign Division in Military Intelligence Directorate, IHQ of MoD (Army), BGS (Ops) at HQ Western Command, Chandimandir and BGS at Chetak Corps.

In addition, he served as an assistant adjutant and instructor at the National Defence Academy, Pune. General officer has an extensive service experience along western borders, deserts of Rajasthan and Punjab.

=== General officer ===
Promoted to the rank of Major general, he was appointed General officer commanding Counter Insurgency Force-K (Kilo Force) in the Kashmir Valley. He then served as the Additional Director General of Public Information (ADGPI) at Army Headquarters. In the rank of Lieutenant General, he was the first Director General of Territorial Army (DGTA).

=== XV Corps Commander ===
On 17 March 2021, Gen Pandey was appointed the General Officer Commanding XV Corps in Srinagar. XV Corps, also known as Chinar Corps, is responsible for military operations in the Kashmir valley.

=== Later career ===
He was appointed as the Commandant of the Army War College, Mhow in April 2022 and took over on 9 May 2022. He retired on 30 June 2024 after almost 39 years of service in the Indian army.

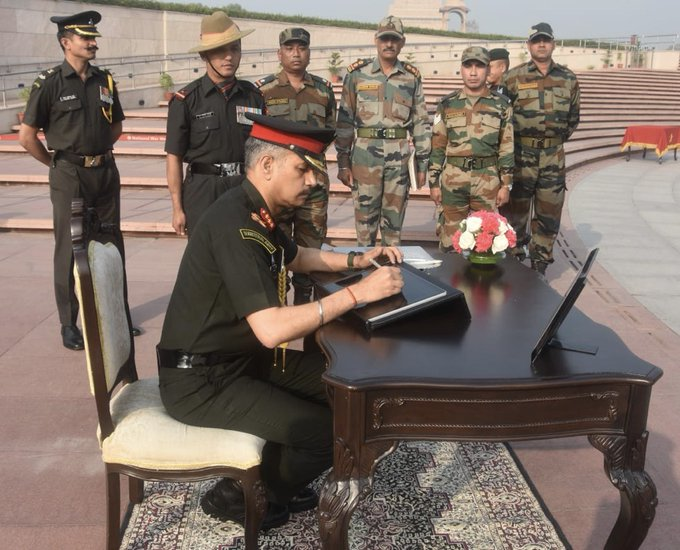
Lt Gen D P Pandey taking over as GOC XV Corps.

== Nation-first approach ==
=== Hybrid terrorist ===
With the challenge for security forces in the Kashmir valley in the form of hybrid terrorism, Lt Gen Pandey cautioned the Kashmiri society to be more vigilant of these ‘part-time’ terrorists. They influence & corrupt the youths’ ideology. He reiterated to continue efforts to recognise such people in the valley. Young people thought process should be towards peace and development.

== Citizens and soldier connect ==
=== Tiranga Revolution ===
UT Administration through the Security Review Meeting forums and engaging secretary level functionaries along with grass-root public participation ushered in ‘Tiranga Revolution’. The Tricolor was dedicated to the people of J&K by Shri Manoj Sinha, Hon’ble Lt Governor of J&K in the presence of GOC 15 Corps. Apart from this, Tricolor was hoisted at Kupwara, Awantipur, Shopian, Gulmarg and various Government offices and school giving a sense of ‘One Nation One Flag’.

== Personal life ==
Lt Gen DP Pandey has kept his personal life private. He is married to an educationist, and they have one son, their only child, who serves in the Indian Army.

=== Festivals ===
Lt Gen D P Pandey endeavoured to reinforce the pride among the people of Kashmir in their own cultural festivals by organising functions for Wular festival, Bangus mela, Doodpathri festival, Keran mela and many others.

== Medical assistance ==
=== Artificial limbs ===
In co-operation with Jaipur-based NGO, Bhagwan Mahavir Viklang Sahayata Samiti (BMVSS), Artificial Limb fitment and assistance camps were organised for especially abled persons in 15 Corps Zone from 6 to 19 Oct 21. The joint venture between the Indian Army and Jaipur Foot Foundation was themed ‘Saksham Hum, Saksham Kashmir, Saksham Bharat’. Lt Gen DP Pandey complimented the NGO, Bhagwan Mahavir Viklang Sahayata Samiti for its noble efforts. He emphasised that the artificial limbs would further invigorate the specially abled citizens to lead an enabled and empowered life. The camp has enabled and empowered specially abled Kashmiri citizens including children.

=== Covid hospital ===
To combat the surge of COVID-19 cases in Apr 2021 in Kashmir and to prepare of the anticipated third wave of COVID-19, a 50-bed COVID-19 facility was established and dedicated to the citizens of Kashmir. It will augment the infrastructure against the pandemic.

=== Oxygen plant ===
A non-operational oxygen plant (Enn Dee Gases) with a capacity of filling 700 cylinders of oxygen per day, located at Rangreth was resuscitated by Chinar Corps. On the UT Administration's request, Chinar Corps co-opted IAF to transport the required spare parts from Mumbai. A team of technicians from 15 Corps Zone Workshop, Rangreth along with civil technicians made the plant serviceable within four days. Oxygen plant of Enn Dee was lying out of action for last five years. It has the capacity of filling 700 cylinders of oxygen per day. It was vital to make this plant serviceable to increase the oxygen production capacity in the valley.

== Guiding the youth ==
=== Parivar School ===
Lt Gen D P Pandey appreciated the noble step taken by the Indrani Balan Foundation for the people of Baramulla, which led to building of new infrastructure for the Parivaar School to facilitate a conducive learning environment for the specially abled children. More than 150 families of Baramulla district will be benefitted by this school. The curriculum of the school has been created keeping in mind the type and degree of disability of the students. The building has been designed taking into account the needs of the students including specially abled friendly washrooms. More than 150 families of Baramulla district will be benefited by this school.

=== National Cadet Corps ===
Lt Gen D P Pandey facilitated the introduction of NCC camps in the remote bowls of Machhal, Keran & Gurez sectors. In addition, NCC camp were organised for the first time in Tangdhar and there are plans in pipeline to revive and expand NCC's foot prints across the valley.

== Education and sports ==
=== Wushu martial arts championship ===
An open championship in Wushu Martial Arts was conducted on 14 & 15 Sep 21 at Manasbal lake. The event witnessed 279 boys and girls participating in the events, and was aimed at increasing youth exposure to martial arts.

=== Dhruva Bike Rally ===
To commemorate the 22nd year of victory in Kargil war, HQ Northern Command conducted a two-day Dhruva Kargil Rally to commemorate Kargil Vijay Diwas. Lieutenant General Yogesh Kumar Joshi, then GOC-in-C, Northern Command led the rally.

=== Clean Dal & Jhelum Campaigns ===
‘Save Dal’ and ‘Clean Jhelum’ Campaigns were organised to promote eco-conservation. A number of events like ‘Shikara race’, a bike rally for ‘ Clean Dal’, and speed-boat rally carrying the National Flags were held. The campaign garnered massive local participation and respect for the Army.

== Awards and decorations ==
He has been awarded the Param Vishisht Seva Medal (2024), Uttam Yudh Seva Medal (2022), Ati Vishisht Seva Medal (2020), Vishist Seva Medal (2011), and the COAS and GOC - in - C commendation card for his service.

Param Vishisht Seva Medal		Uttam Yudh Seva Medal	
Ati Vishisht Seva Medal	Vishisht Seva Medal	Special Service Medal	Operation Vijay Star
Siachen Glacier Medal	Operation Vijay Medal	Operation Parakram Medal	Sainya Seva Medal
High Altitude Medal	Videsh Seva Medal	75th Anniversary of Independence Medal	50th Anniversary of Independence Medal
30 Years Long Service Medal	20 Years Long Service Medal	9 Years Long Service Medal	UNTAC

== Dates of rank ==
Insignia	Rank	Component	Date of rank
	Second Lieutenant	Indian Army	14 December 1985
	Lieutenant	Indian Army	14 December 1987
	Captain	Indian Army	14 December 1990
	Major	Indian Army	14 December 1996
	Lieutenant-Colonel	Indian Army	
	Colonel	Indian Army	
	Brigadier	Indian Army	
	Major General	Indian Army	
	Lieutenant-General	Indian Army	

Military offices
Preceded by B. S. Raju	General Officer Commanding XV Corps; 2021-2022	Succeeded by Amardeep Singh Aujla
