= B. S. Raju =

Indian Army general

Lieutenant General B. S. Raju PVSM UYSM AVSM YSM
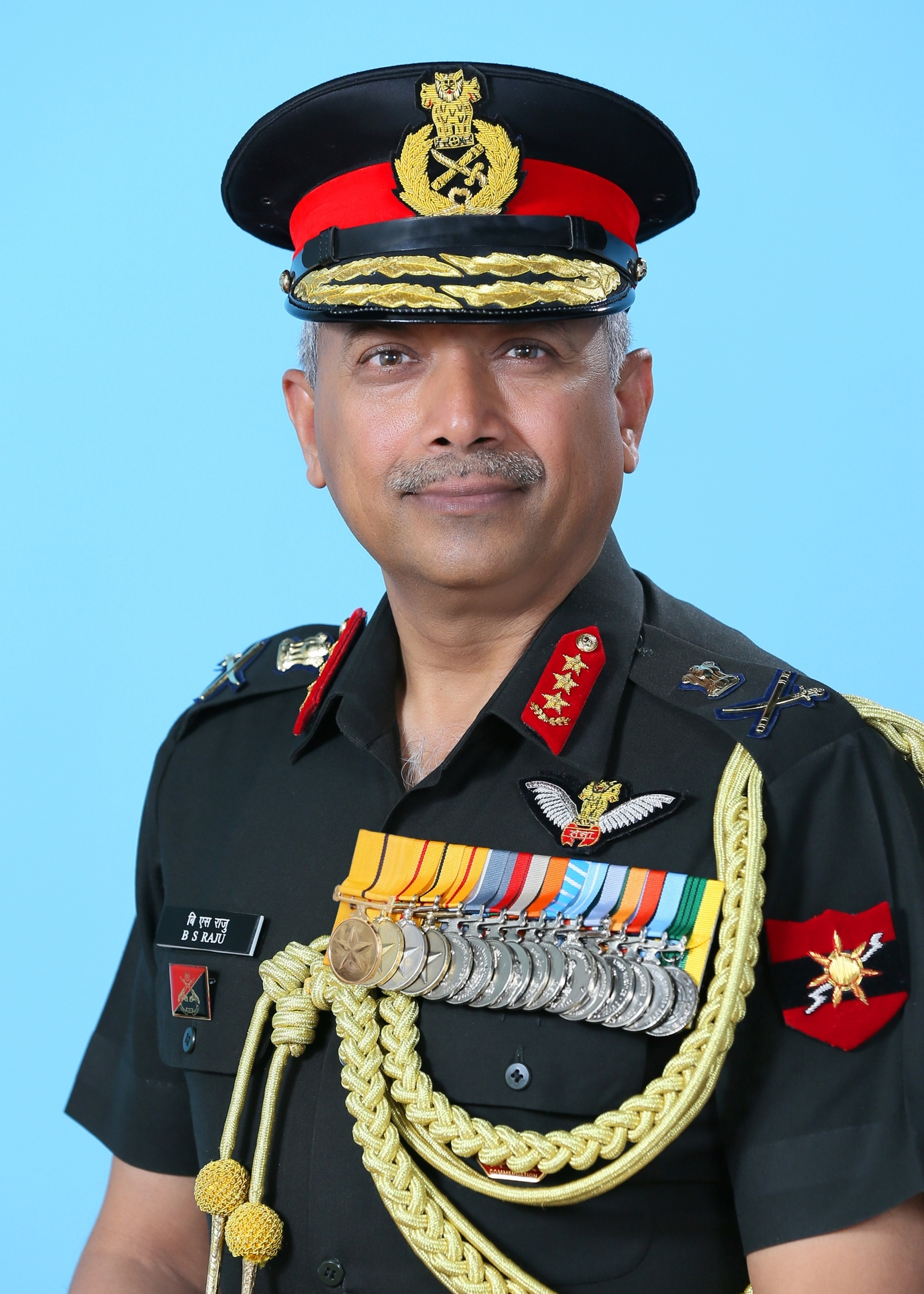

General Officer Commanding-in-Chief South Western Command
- In office 1 March 2023 – 31 October 2023
- Preceded by: Amardeep Singh Bhinder
- Succeeded by: Dhiraj Seth

44th Vice Chief of the Army Staff
- In office 1 May 2022 – 28 February 2023
- President: Ram Nath Kovind; Droupadi Murmu
- Chief of Army Staff: Manoj Pande
- Preceded by: Manoj Pande
- Succeeded by: M. V. Suchindra Kumar

Military service
- Allegiance: India
- Branch/service: Indian Army
- Years of service: 15 December 1984 – 31 October 2023
- Rank: Lieutenant General
- Unit: 11 JAT
- Commands: South Western Army; XV Corps; Indian Military Training Team; Victor Force; 15 JAT
- Service number: IC-42389A
- Awards: Param Vishisht Seva Medal; Uttam Yudh Seva Medal; Ati Vishisht Seva Medal; Yudh Seva Medal

Lieutenant General Baggavalli Somashekar Raju, PVSM, UYSM, AVSM, YSM (born 19 October 1963) is a retired general officer of the Indian Army. He last served as the General Officer Commanding-in-Chief South Western Command. He earlier served as the 44th Vice Chief of the Army Staff and as the Director General Military Operations (DGMO).

He had been the 49th Commander of the XV Corps (Chinar Corps) from 1 March 2020 to 17 March 2021, assuming the post from Lieutenant General KJS Dhillon. Before taking over the charge of the Chinar Corps, he served as the Director General of Staff Duties. He is also the Colonel of the Jat Regiment since 1 February 2021 after taking over from Lieutenant General S K Saini, the Vice Chief of the Army Staff.

He was appointed as the Vice Chief of the Army Staff on 29 April 2022. He took charge on 1 May 2022 succeeding General Manoj Pande (then Lt General) on his elevation.

== Early life and education ==
Raju was born in Chikkamagalore district, in a Lingayat family which traces its origin to Baggavalli village near Ajjampura in Chikmagalur district. Raju is an alumnus of Sainik School, Bijapur, and the National Defence Academy, Pune.

He is a graduate of Defence Services Staff College, Wellington and the Royal College of Defence Studies, United Kingdom. He also attended the Naval Postgraduate School in Monterey, California where he completed his Masters program in Counter Terrorism.

He is married to Shakunthala Raju, also from Karnataka, and the couple have a son and daughter.

== Career ==
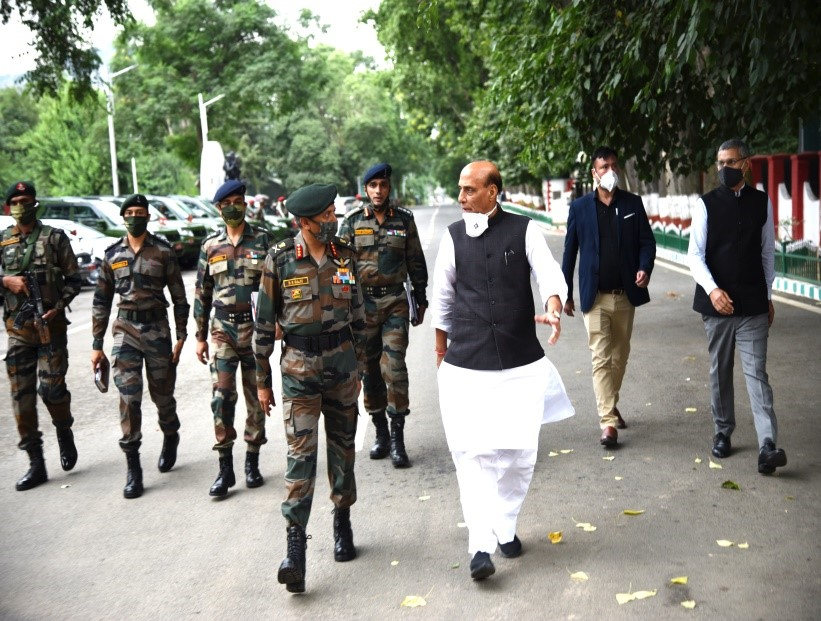
Lt Gen BS Raju during the visit of Shri Rajnath Singh, Defence Minister to Chinar Corps in 2020

Raju was commissioned in December 1984 in the 11th battalion, the Jat Regiment (11 Jat). He later commanded 15th Battalion, the Jat Regiment (15 JAT). He has served as an Directing Staff at the Defence Services Staff College, Wellington and at the Army War College, Mhow. In staff appointments, he has served as the brigade major of an infantry brigade and as the Colonel Military Secretary (Legal) at Army HQ.

After being promoted to the rank of brigadier, he was appointed commander of the Uri Brigade in August 2011. He commanded the brigade till 30 December 2012. He subsequently served as the Brigadier General Staff (BGS) at HQ XVI Corps and as the Deputy Director General Military Operations (DDGMO) and Director General Staff Duties at Army HQ.

=== General officer ===
The General Officer served as Commandant, Indian Military Training Team in Bhutan prior to assuming command of XV Corps. He has an incisive understanding of Jammu and Kashmir, as he has served in Kashmir for five tenures since 1984.

=== Victor Force Commander ===
Lt Gen B. S. Raju commanded the elite Counter Insurgency Force in troubled times from 28 March 2017 to 1 April 2018 post elimination of Burhan Wani, the poster boy of Hizbul Mujahideen. It was during this period only that a blooming footballer Majid Khan who had treaded the path of terrorism was given opportunity to return to mainstream and he had surrendered. As a Force Commander he oversaw the successful operation in which the killers of Lt Umar Fayaz were eliminated in South Kashmir

=== XV Corps Commander ===
He was the General Officer Commanding of the XV Corps', or 15 Corps, also known as Chinar Corps Indian Army, a Corps of the Indian Army which is presently located in Srinagar and responsible for military operations in the Kashmir Valley.

=== Human Approach Operation ===
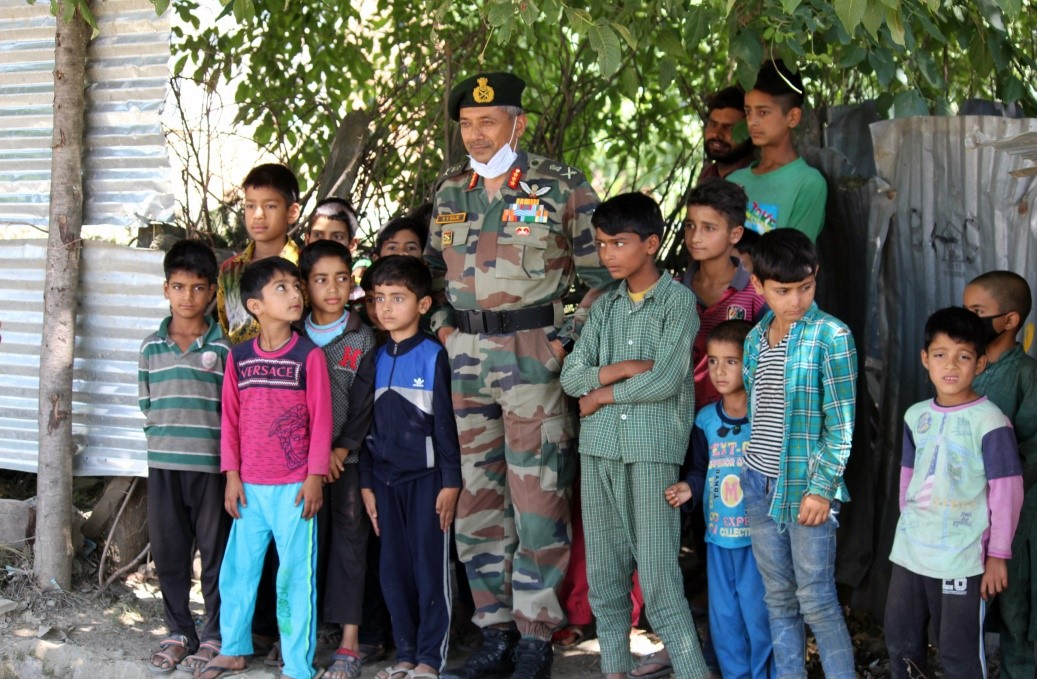
Lt Gen B S Raju during the interaction with local children of Kashmir

While Commanding Counter Insurgency Force (Victor) in troubled time of 2017–2018, he built a reputation of a man giving respect to human values and had a deep sense of belonging with the locals. While taking over, he emphasised that "The Army is a friend of every civilian and that message has been conveyed aptly by my predecessor. My every attempt would be to continue this practice".

=== Facilitate Return of Local Terrorist from Path of Terrorism ===
Lt Gen B. S. Raju's key focus was to allow those who have picked up arms to surrender and join the mainstream. It has greatly helped the youth who have gone "astray" to come back and with recruitment fairly lowest in last decade has resulted in substantial reduction in number of terrorist operating in Kashmir. With people as the centre of gravity, his efforts were being directed in that direction during his command of the XV Corps of Indian Army. Lt Gen B. S. Raju had underlined numerous times that the army is working more on ensuring surrender rather than going for straight neutralisation.

=== India, Pakistan Agree to Observe Ceasefire along LoC ===
On 25 February 2021 India Pakistan agreed to stand by the Ceasefire Agreement of 2003, which was a welcome move across both the borders. Guns will remain silent and locals living across the border will get a chance to live their normal lives, which was hampered by numerous cease fire violations in the past. Lt Gen B. S. Raju also welcomed the move and commented that observing ceasefire is in interest of both India and Pakistan, and need of hour and he wants this truce to work.

=== Message to Youth of Union Territory of Jammu and Kashmir ===
During one of the interview, Lt Gen B S Raju gave a message to youth of Kashmir. He amply conveyed to the youth that even if they have drifted from the mainstream society and have picked up arms, they will still be taken care of. He told that even during operations any youth can come back and we will help him in joining mainstream. "My main message to youth - is you can get back and we will take care of you. In the last six months, seventeen of those who had strayed have come back and we will take care of them. My appeal to the youth who have gone astray is to come back. They can get back anytime, including during operations. They can call anybody, their parents, our helpline and we will organise their return," he said. Again on 7 July 2020, Lt Gen Raju was quoted where he said, "As I said, every loss of life is unfortunate. We don't want to kill militants, we give them an opportunity to surrender."

=== A Day with Company Commander ===
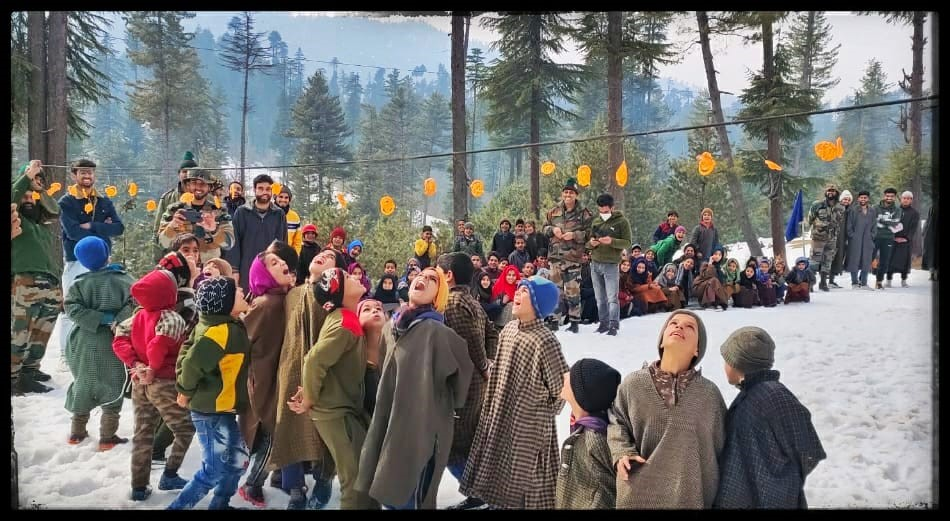
A day with Company Commander

Under Lt Gen B. S. Raju the Indian Army started "A Day with Company Commander", which was a model for the Soldier-Citizen connect. The intent is to break the barriers between soldier and the new generation. The need that the new generation should get a different experience than of the previous one, because they experienced terrorism and its pitfalls for last thirty years. Hence 'day with company commander' is being replicated at all the Company Operating Bases.

=== Chinar Corps Helpline ===
It was during Lt Gen B. S. Raju's tenure as a Corps Commander that Chinar Corps established a Feedback & Grievances Helpline (9484101010) for the population of Union Territory of Jammu and Kashmir. While inaugurating the helpline, Lt Gen B. S. Raju stressed that "Helpline number has been started to strengthen connectivity between people, Army in J-K." This helpline is also accessible through Telegram, receives hundreds of phone calls and has become a true "Madadgar" for the Awam of Union Territory of Jammu and Kashmir.

=== Khairiyat Patrol ===
In order to assist the locals residing in remote areas Indian Army conducts Khairiyat Patrols, during Lt Gen B. S. Raju's tenure this cause got a special impetus in view of the COVID-19 challenges. During the patrol, the Army reached out to Awam to know about their well-being and provided medical attention to those in need.

=== Sports and Cultural Outreach Programs ===
In an effort to strike a common chord with the local population Indian Army facilitates conduct of sports and cultural programs in J&K. To extend the reach of the activities Lt Gen B. S. Raju pushed for games at village level which are being conducted across Kashmir valley. The village games were rustic games that were popular with the locals of the region and rejuvenated rural games. More than 100 such events were conducted in which more than 6000 children participated. The youth of the higher reaches also participated in such events.

=== Running of Army Goodwill School ===
The inclusion of digital learning in Army Goodwill Schools empowers the students by getting them to become more interested in learning and expanding their horizon. Power Grid Corporation of India Ltd in continuation to its CSR sponsorship for 'Digitization of the Army Goodwill Schools' has sponsored 10 more schools for digitization. This project was executed by iDream Social Edtech Foundation. The digitization has bought the AGSs at par with the schools across the country. Teachers and students of these schools have access to instructional material in their tablets. The results of AGSs in 10th and 12th Board exams have been improving every year. UT of J & K schools will further improve the teaching-learning methods, to the benefit of the students of these schools. This initiative of Power Grid Cooperation of India Limited towards making a difference to the lives of Kashmiri students, mostly from under privileged section.

== Awards and decorations ==

Param Vishisht Seva Medal	Uttam Yudh Seva Medal	Ati Vishisht Seva Medal	Yudh Seva Medal
Siachen Glacier Medal	Special Service Medal	Operation Parakram Medal	Sainya Seva Medal
High Altitude Service Medal	Videsh Seva Medal	75th Independence Anniversary Medal	50th Anniversary of Independence Medal
30 Years Long Service Medal	20 Years Long Service Medal	9 Years Long Service Medal	Indian Military Training Team Bhutan Medal

== Dates of rank ==
Insignia	Rank	Component	Date of rank
	Second Lieutenant	Indian Army	15 December 1984
	Lieutenant	Indian Army	7 September 1986; 15 December 1986 (substantive)
	Captain	Indian Army	7 July 1989; 15 December 1989 (substantive)
	Major	Indian Army	15 December 1995
	Lieutenant Colonel	Indian Army	11 July 2001; 16 December 2004 (substantive)
	Colonel	Indian Army	1 April 2006
	Brigadier	Indian Army	13 June 2011 (acting); 30 December 2011 (substantive, with seniority from 6 April 2010)
	Major General	Indian Army	27 March 2017 (seniority from 1 February 2015)
	Lieutenant General	Indian Army	14 November 2019

Military offices
Preceded by Amardeep Singh Bhinder	General Officer Commanding-in-Chief South Western Command; 1 March 2023 - 31 October 2023	Succeeded by Dhiraj Seth
Preceded by Manoj Pande	Vice Chief of the Army Staff; 1 May 2022 - 1 March 2023	Succeeded by M. V. Suchindra Kumar
Preceded by Paramjit Singh Sangha	Director General Military Operations; 18 March 2021 - 30 April 2022	Succeeded by Manoj Kumar Katiyar
Preceded by KJS Dhillon	General Officer Commanding XV Corps; 1 March 2020 - 17 March 2021	Succeeded by Devendra Pratap Pandey
