= Kashmir Premier League (India) =

T20 Cricket League

Kashmir Premier League (KPL)
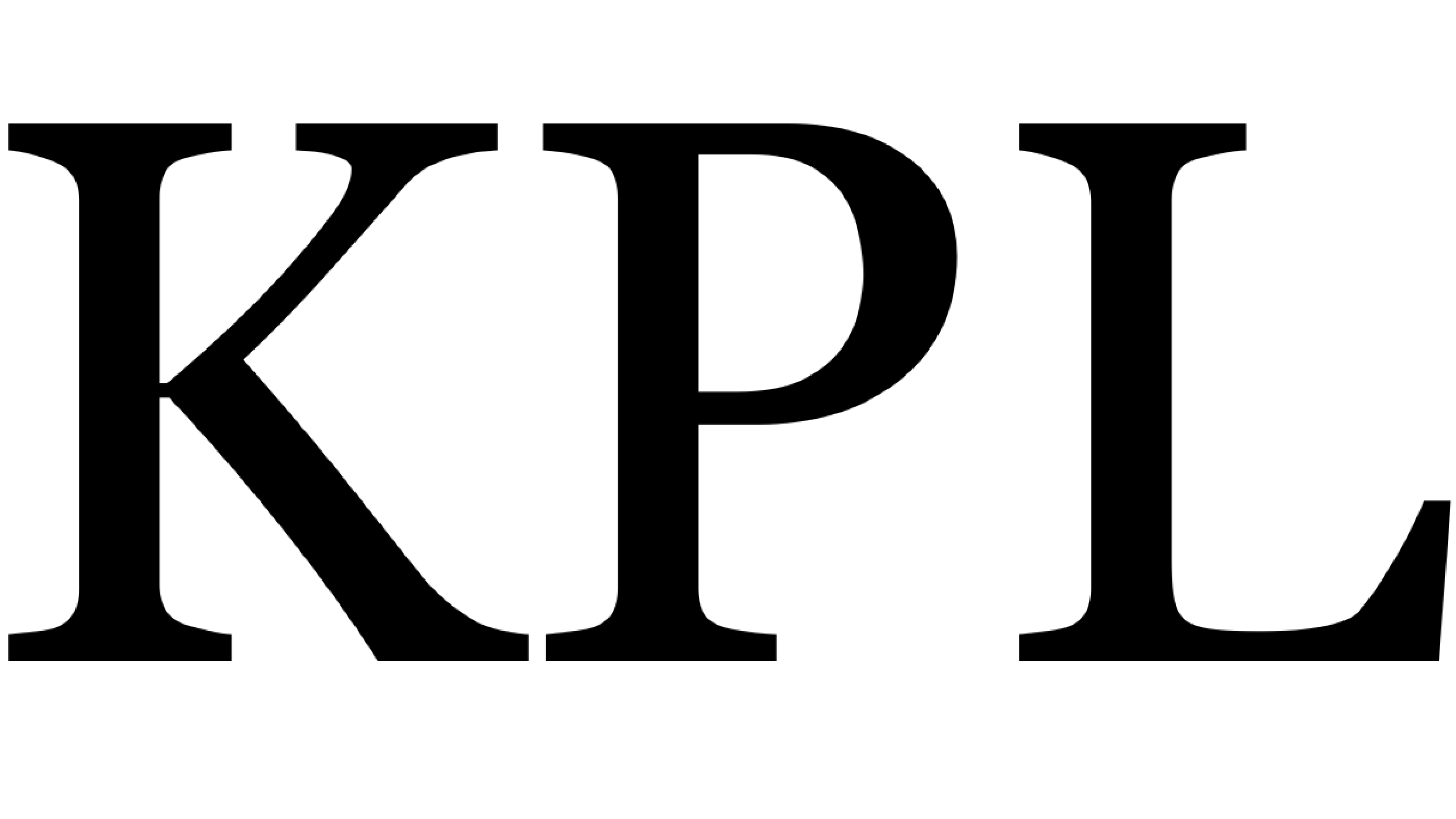
- Official TNPL logo
- Countries: India
- Administrator: JKCA
- Format: Twenty20
- First edition: 2011
- Latest edition: 2021
- Tournament format: Round-robin league and Playoffs
- Number of teams: 14

The Kashmir Premier League (KPL) is a Twenty20 cricket league in Jammu and Kashmir The league was started in 2011 by the Indian Army and the Government of Jammu and Kashmir. The Army sponsors the teams, and provides cricket kits and refreshments. The purpose of the Kashmir Premier League is to build bridges between Kashmiris and Indian Army men. The league is the brainchild of Group Officer Commanding (GOC) of XV Corps, Lieutenant General Syed Ata Hasnain. The T20 cricket tournament is part of the Indian Army's Operation Sadhbhavana.

In the initial editions of KPL, Srinagar, Baramulla, Anantnag and Budgam districts fielded two teams each while as Kupwara, Bandipora, Kulgam, Pulwama, Shopian and Ganderbal fielded one team each in League Stage. The teams played 50 matches over a span of 41 days. The winner of the tournament will get ₹5 lakh (US$5,200) while the runners-up gets ₹ 3 lakh. The team which finishes third place gets ₹ 2 lakh.

In 2012, then Indian captain Mahendra singh Dhoni was chief guest in second edition in Baramulla. Swarnim Vijay Varsh Kashmir Premier League 2021 Phase-1 started in July 2021. Phase 2 of Kashmir Premier League 2021 started in Srinagar on 28 July 2021. The Final of 2021 Swarnim Vijay Varsh Kashmir Premier League was played between Badgam Braves and Shahi Shopian at Sher-i-Kashmir Stadium, Srinagar on 29 August 2021. Badgam Braves won two month long 2021 Kashmir Premier League, in which 199 teams from all over Kashmir Valley participated. Indian Cricketer Yusuf Pathan was present as the chief guest in the final. The 5th edition of Kashmir Premier League (KPL) concluded on 24 August 2022, when Kulgam Knights defeated Anantnag Achievers by 20 runs at Sher-i-Kashmir Stadium, Srinagar. Over 200 teams from across Kashmir valley participated in Phase-1 of the Kashmir Premier League 2022, which commenced on June 1,2022. 10 victorious teams thereafter competed for the coveted trophy in the months of July and August 2022.

There was proposal to merge Kashmir Premier League and Jammu Premier League.

== Teams ==
The qualifying rounds were being held across the various districts, with the winner from each district advancing to the League Stage. The League Stage featuring 14 teams from all the 10 districts in the Kashmir Valley.

- Shopian Super Kings
- Budgam Badshahs
- Srinagar Sherdils
- Ganderbal Gladiators
- Kupwara Knights
- Anantnag Arsenals
- Budgam Bemisals
- Srinagar Shahjahans
Cities represented by KPL teams

== Stadiums ==
- Sher-i-Kashmir Stadium
- Delhi Public School, Athwajan, Srinagar
- Sports Stadium Ashmuji

== See also ==
- Sher-i-Kashmir Stadium
- Real Kashmir FC
- Maulana Azad Stadium, Jammu
