= Amardeep Singh Bhinder =

Lieutinant general of India

Lieutenant General Amardeep Singh Bhinder PVSM, AVSM, VSM
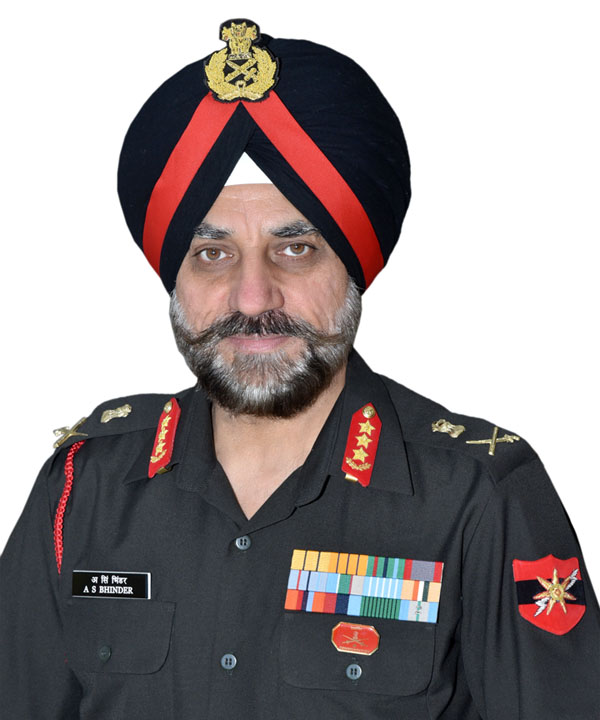
- Military career
- Allegiance: India
- Branch: Indian Army
- Service years: June 1983 – 28 February 2023
- Rank: Lieutenant General
- Service number: IC-41083L
- Unit: The Deccan Horse
- Commands: South Western Army; I Corps
- Awards: Param Vishisht Seva Medal; Ati Vishisht Seva Medal; Vishisht Seva Medal

Lieutenant General Amardeep Singh Bhinder, PVSM, AVSM, VSM is a former general officer of the Indian Army. He last served as the General Officer Commanding-in-Chief South Western Command from 2021 to 2023. He assumed command from Lieutenant General Alok Singh Kler on 1 April 2021.

== Career ==
Bhinder was commissioned in the 9th Horse (Deccan Horse) in June 1983. A graduate of the National Defence Academy, Khadakwasla, he has commanded both an armoured brigade and an armoured division, and has also served as a UN peacekeeping force military observer. He served as Director General Military Training at Integrated HQ before taking command of the elite I Corps on 31 January 2019. He then served as Deputy Chief of the Army Staff (Information Systems) before assuming command of the South Western Command.

== Awards and decorations ==
Bhinder has been decorated with the Vishisht Seva Medal (VSM) and the Ati Vishisht Seva Medal (AVSM), which he was awarded in the 2021 Republic Day honours.

	Param Vishisht Seva Medal	Ati Vishisht Seva Medal	
Vishisht Seva Medal	Samanya Seva Medal	Special Service Medal	Operation Vijay Medal
Operation Parakram Medal	Videsh Seva Medal	75th Independence Anniversary Medal	50th Anniversary of Independence Medal
30 Years Long Service Medal	20 Years Long Service Medal	9 Years Long Service Medal	UNMEE Medal

== Dates of rank ==
Insignia	Rank	Component	Date of rank
	Second Lieutenant	Indian Army	18 June 1983
	Lieutenant	Indian Army	18 June 1985
	Captain	Indian Army	18 June 1988
	Major	Indian Army	18 June 1994
	Lieutenant-Colonel	Indian Army	16 December 2004
	Colonel	Indian Army	15 March 2006
	Brigadier	Indian Army	27 August 2010 (substantive, with seniority from 16 August 2009)
	Major General	Indian Army	18 November 2015 (seniority from 23 August 2014)
	Lieutenant-General	Indian Army	1 March 2018

Military offices
Preceded by Alok Singh Kler	General Officer-Commanding-in-Chief South Western Army; 1 April 2021 -	Succeeded by B. S. Raju
