= Podali Shankar Rajeshwar =

Indian general

Lieutenant General P S Rajeshwar PVSM, AVSM, VSM, ADC
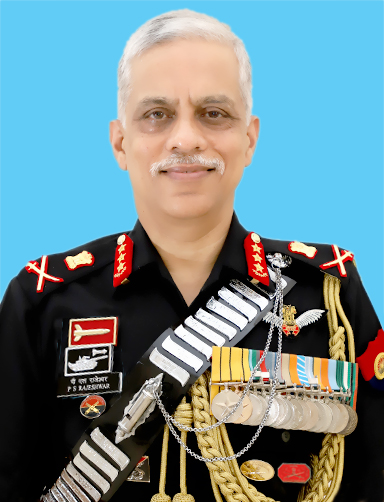
- Born: 27 May 1960 (age 66)
- Military career
- Allegiance: India
- Branch: Indian Army
- Service years: December 1980 - May 2020
- Rank: Lieutenant General
- Service number: IC-39380A
- Unit: Regiment of Artillery
- Commands: Commander-in-Chief, Andaman and Nicobar Command; Chief of Integrated Defence Staff; XII Corps
- Conflicts: Operation Parakram
- Awards: Param Vishisht Seva Medal; Ati Vishisht Seva Medal; Vishisht Seva Medal

Lieutenant General Podali Shankar Rajeshwar PVSM, AVSM, VSM, ADC is a former General officer in the Indian Army. He last served as the 14th Commander-in-Chief, Andaman and Nicobar Command, from December 2019 to May 2020. He took office on 1 December 2019 when Vice Admiral Bimal Verma retired. He superannuated on 31 May 2020, handing over command to Lieutenant General Manoj Pande. Earlier, he had served as the 12th Chief of Integrated Defence Staff, from November 2018 to November 2019.

== Early life and education ==
Rajeshwar is an alumnus of Indian Military Academy, Dehradun and National Defence College, Delhi. He also holds a master's degree in national security administration from National Defense College, Philippines.

== Career ==
Rajeshwar was commissioned into the Indian army's Regiment of Artillery in December 1980. He has various operational experiences in high altitude areas, counter-insurgency areas in the North East, and counter-terrorist operations in Jammu and Kashmir. He has held commands of an artillery regiment during Operation Parakram, an infantry brigade at line of control, General-Officer-Commanding XII Corps, Director General of Perspective Planning at the Integrated Headquarters and GOC of Romeo Force in Jammu and Kashmir. He has also served in various United Nations Peacekeeping operations to Rwanda and Mozambique.

Rajeshwar served as 12th Chief of Integrated Defence Staff to the Chairman of the Chiefs of Staff Committee (CISC) of the Indian Armed Forces. He assumed the office on 1 November 2018 when Lieutenant General Satish Dua retired, and served in the same capacity till 30 November 2019 when Vice Admiral R. Hari Kumar took over.

== Honours and decorations ==
During 38 years of his career, he has been awarded Param Vishisht Seva Medal in January (2020), Ati Vishisht Seva Medal in January 2018 and Vishisht Seva Medal in January 2016 for his service.

Param Vishisht Seva Medal		Ati Vishisht Seva Medal	
Vishisht Seva Medal	Samanya Seva Medal		Special Service Medal
Siachen Glacier Medal	Operation Vijay Medal	Operation Parakram Medal	Sainya Seva Medal
High Altitude Service Medal	Videsh Seva Medal	50th Anniversary of Independence Medal	30 Years Long Service Medal
20 Years Long Service Medal	9 Years Long Service Medal	ONUMOZ	UNAMIR

== Dates of rank ==
Insignia	Rank	Component	Date of rank
	Second Lieutenant	Indian Army	13 December 1980
	Lieutenant	Indian Army	13 December 1982
	Captain	Indian Army	13 December 1985
	Major	Indian Army	13 December 1991
	Lieutenant-Colonel	Indian Army	31 December 2002
	Colonel	Indian Army	1 February 2005
	Brigadier	Indian Army	12 December 2008 (acting); 1 February 2009 (substantive; seniority from 31 January 2008)
	Major General	Indian Army	31 January 2013 (seniority from 11 April 2011)
	Lieutenant-General	Indian Army	1 April 2016 (substantive)

Military offices
Preceded by Vice Admiral Bimal Verma	Commander-in-Chief, Andaman and Nicobar Command; 1 December 2019 – 31 May 2020	Succeeded by Lieutenant General Manoj Pande
Preceded by Lt Gen Satish Dua	Chief of Integrated Defence Staff; 1 November 2018 – 30 November 2019	Succeeded by Vice Admiral R. Hari Kumar
Preceded by V P Singh	General Officer Commanding XII Corps	Succeeded by R K Jagga
