= Chief of Integrated Defence Staff =

Statutory office of the Indian Armed Forces

Chief of Integrated Defence Staff to the Chairman Chiefs of Staff Committee
- Flag of the Integrated Defence Staff

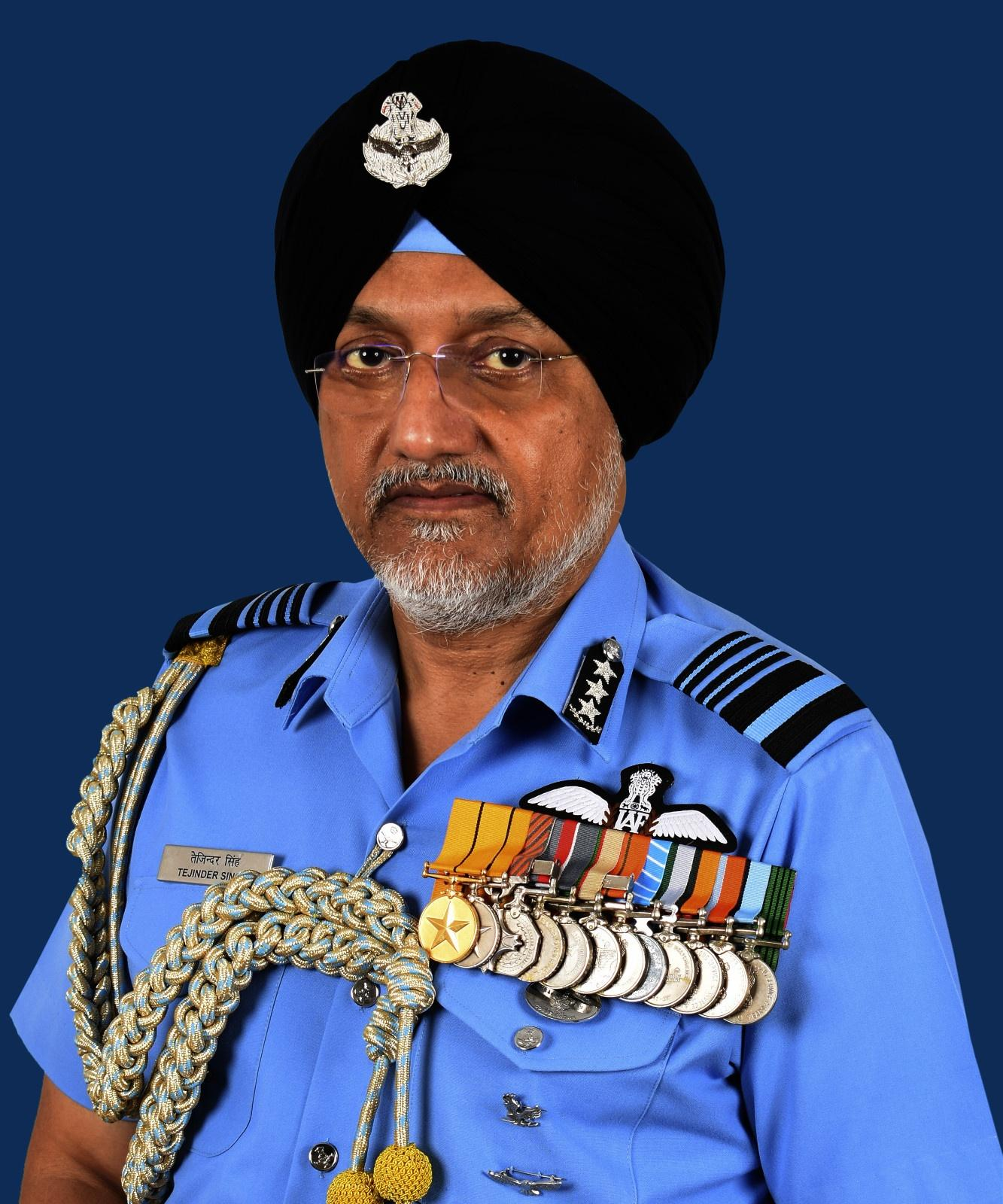
- Incumbent; Air Marshal Tejinder Singh; PVSM AVSM VM since 1 July 2026
- Indian Armed Forces
- Type: Vice chief of defence
- Status: Executive-in-charge of the Integrated Defence Staff.
- Abbreviation: CISC
- Member of: Chiefs of Staff Committee; Integrated Defence Staff; Vice Chiefs Committee
- Reports to: Chief of Defence Staff
- Seat: South Hutments, Kashmir House, Rajaji Marg, New Delhi
- Appointer: Appointments Committee of the Cabinet Ministry of Defence
- Term length: Up to the age of 60
- Formation: 1 October 2001; 24 years ago
- First holder: Lieutenant General Pankaj Joshi; PVSM, AVSM
- Deputy: Deputy Chiefs of the Integrated Defence Staff (DCIDS)
- Website: Official website

The Chief of Integrated Defence Staff to Chairman Chiefs of Staff Committee (CISC) is the statutory office that heads the Integrated Defence Staff (IDS), the principal inter-service syndicate of the Indian Armed Forces. Customarily held by a three-star officer nominated from either of India's three armed services, the CISC is the second-highest authority responsible for inter-service jointness, subordinate only to the Chief of Defence Staff (CDS).

By function, the CISC is the executive-in-charge of the IDS, and thus, maintains oversight over inter-service coordination on crucial disciplines related to military functioning, specifically, intelligence, doctrine, joint planning, budgetary allocations and training. In addition, the CISC serves as a non-voting member of the Chiefs of Staff Committee - of which the CDS is its Chairman; thus by definition, the CISC reports to the CDS, who is the final authority on military jointness.

Domestically, the CISC ranks 23rd-overall in the Indian order of precedence and is the status-equivalent to the Vice Chiefs of Staff of the Indian Army, the Indian Navy and the Indian Air Force; internationally, it is identical to Canada's Vice Chief of the Defence Staff and Spain's Chief of the Joint Defence Staff.

== Description ==
=== Mandate ===
As the penultimate authority (second only to the CDS) tasked with the affairs of inter-service administration of the armed forces, the CISC participates in two crucial bodies: the Chiefs of Staff Committee (COSC) and the Integrated Defence Staff (IDS).

==== Chiefs of Staff Committee ====
The COSC is an inter-service syndicate of the armed forces, which functions as a principal advisory body dealing with matters related to inter-service coordination, policy formulation and strategy development. It comprises the CDS - who acts as its Permanent Chairman and the Chiefs of Staff of the three armed services; the CISC is also a member, albeit a non-voting one.

- To supervise and control the IDS, which acts as the arm-cum-secretariat of the CDS and the COSC.
- To chair the Defence Crisis Management Group.
- To supervise the coordination of Long Range Plans, Five-Year Plans and Annual Budgetary proposals for the three services and present a coordinated set of proposals to the Minister of Defence after discussion with Chiefs of Staff and the Defence Secretary.
- To coordinate, analyse, assess and remove the impact of any discovered critical deficiencies on the three armed services.
- To coordinate, conduct and plan inter-service training.

==== Vice Chief's Committee ====
In addition to the COSC, the CISC chairs the VCC, which comprises the Vice Chiefs of Staff of the three services; this has been maintained since the status of CISC itself is deemed equivalent to that of a Vice Chief.

- To deal with any inter-service issues.
- To resolve inter-service disputes.
- To provide military recommendations to the Ministry of Defence and Cabinet Committee on Security (CCS).

=== Structure ===
Since its inception in 2001, the office of CISC has been held on a rotational basis by the three armed services, with a three-star officer being the customary occupant.

Additionally, the CISC is assisted by the undermentioned subordinate officers, all of whom are also three-star officers:

- Deputy Chief of Integrated Defence Staff (Policy Planning and Force Development) - DCIDS (PP&FD).
- Deputy Chief of Integrated Defence Staff (Doctrine, Organisation and Training) - DCIDS (DOT).
- Deputy Chief of Integrated Defence Staff (Operations) - DCIDS (OPS).
- Director General Defence Intelligence Agency & Deputy Chief of Integrated Defence Staff (Intelligence) - DGDIA & DCIDS (Int).
- Deputy Chief of Integrated Defence Staff (Medical Branch) - DCIDS (Med).

== Appointees ==
List of Chief of Integrated Defence Staff
No.	Portrait	Name	Assumed office	Left office	Time in office	Service branch	Ref.
1	Pankaj JoshiPVSM, AVSM	Lieutenant General; Pankaj Joshi; PVSM, AVSM	1 October 2001	30 September 2003	1 year, 364 days	Indian Army	
2	Raman PuriPVSM, AVSM, VSM	Vice Admiral; Raman Puri; PVSM, AVSM, VSM	20 October 2003	28 February 2006	2 years, 131 days	Indian Navy	
3	H. S. LidderUYSM, YSM, VSM	Lieutenant General; H. S. Lidder; UYSM, YSM, VSM	2 March 2006	30 September 2008	2 years, 212 days	Indian Army	
4	Suresh Chandra MukulAVSM, VM, VSM	Air Marshal; Suresh Chandra Mukul; AVSM, VM, VSM	1 October 2008	30 December 2010	2 years, 90 days	Indian Air Force	
5	Devendra Kumar JoshiAVSM, YSM, NM, VSM	Vice Admiral; Devendra Kumar Joshi; AVSM, YSM, NM, VSM	31 December 2010	3 July 2011	184 days	Indian Navy	
6	Shekhar SinhaAVSM, NM	Vice Admiral; Shekhar Sinha; AVSM, NM	4 July 2011	30 August 2011	57 days	Indian Navy	
7	S. P. S. CheemaAVSM, NM	Vice Admiral; S. P. S. Cheema; AVSM, NM	31 August 2011	1 November 2012	1 year, 62 days	Indian Navy	
8	N. C. MarwahPVSM, AVSM	Lieutenant General; N. C. Marwah; PVSM, AVSM	2 November 2012	30 June 2013	240 days	Indian Army	
9	Anil ChaitPVSM, AVSM, VSM	Lieutenant General; Anil Chait; PVSM, AVSM, VSM	1 July 2013	30 June 2014	364 days	Indian Army	
10	P. P. ReddyVM	Air Marshal; P. P. Reddy; VM	1 July 2014	30 October 2016	2 years, 121 days	Indian Air Force	
11	Satish DuaUYSM, SM, VSM	Lieutenant General; Satish Dua; UYSM, SM, VSM	31 October 2016	31 October 2018	2 years, 0 days	Indian Army	
12	P. S. RajeshwarPVSM, AVSM, VSM	Lieutenant General; P. S. Rajeshwar; PVSM, AVSM, VSM	1 November 2018	30 November 2019	1 year, 29 days	Indian Army	
13	R. Hari KumarAVSM, VSM	Vice Admiral; R. Hari Kumar; AVSM, VSM	2 December 2019	28 February 2021	1 year, 88 days	Indian Navy	
14	Atul Kumar JainPVSM, AVSM, VSM	Vice Admiral; Atul Kumar Jain; PVSM, AVSM, VSM	28 February 2021	30 September 2021	214 days	Indian Navy	
15	Balabhadra Radha KrishnaAVSM, SC	Air Marshal; Balabhadra Radha Krishna; AVSM, SC	1 October 2021	31 March 2023	1 year, 181 days	Indian Air Force	
16	Johnson P MathewPVSM, UYSM, AVSM, VSM	Lieutenant General; Johnson P Mathew; PVSM, UYSM, AVSM, VSM	03 April 2023	30 April 2025	2 years, 27 days	Indian Army	
17	Ashutosh DixitPVSM, AVSM, VM, VSM	Air Marshal; Ashutosh Dixit; PVSM, AVSM, VM, VSM	1 May 2025	30 June 2026	1 year, 60 days	Indian Air Force	
18	Tejinder SinghPVSM, AVSM, VM	Air Marshal; Tejinder Singh; PVSM, AVSM, VM	1 July 2026	Incumbent	86 days	Indian Air Force	

List of CIDS by branches of service
Branch	Count
Indian Army	7
Indian Navy	6
Indian Air Force	5

== See also ==
=== Inter-service offices ===
- Chiefs of Staff Committee
- Chief of Defence Staff

=== Other offices of the Indian Armed Forces ===
- Chief of the Army Staff
- Chief of the Naval Staff
- Chief of the Air Staff
