= XV Corps (India) =

Military field formation of the Indian Army

- Chinar Corps Formation Sign
- Active: 1916-1918; 1942-1945; 1948-Present
- Country: India
- Branch: Indian Army
- Role: Holding Corps
- Size: Corps
- Part of: Northern Command
- Garrison/HQ: Badami Bagh, Srinagar
- Nickname: Chinar Corps

Commanders
- Current commander: Lieutenant General Balbir Singh
- Notable commanders: General S. M. Shrinagesh; General Sundararajan Padmanabhan; General Bikram Singh

The XV Corps, also known as the Chinar Corps, is a corps of the Indian Army which is presently located in Srinagar and responsible for military operations in the Kashmir Valley. It has participated in all military conflicts with Pakistan and China to date. Lieutenant General Prashant Srivastava is the current Corps Commander since 05 October 2024 taking over from Lt Gen Rajiv Ghai.

== History ==
HQ XV Corps was first raised in Egypt at Port Said on January 12, 1916, under the command of Lieutenant General Sir Henry Horne who was sacked after killing of five under command Indian soldiers. It was part of the British Indian Army during the First World War for operations in Egypt and France. Disbanded in 1918, it was re-raised on March 20, 1942, at Barrackpore for combat operations in Burma during World War II, and after the war, it served in Java and Sumatra.

Disbanded in Karachi in 1947 after repatriation, it was re-raised after India gained independence, as part of the Indian Army, in 1948 as HQ Jammu and Kashmir Force. It underwent a number of name changes till its final re-designation as HQ 15 Corps in 1955 in Udhampur. In June 1972, HQ Northern Command was raised to take over operational control of Jammu & Kashmir. HQ 15 Corps moved to Srinagar to take charge of the Kashmir Valley and Ladakh. After Operation Vijay, HQ 15 Corps was made solely responsible for military operations in the Kashmir Valley.

== Formation Sign ==
The design consists of the 'red-white-red background' depicting a corps of the Indian Army with a Chinar leaf and a battle axe superimposed on it.

== Order of battle ==
The corps currently consists of:

- 19th Mountain Division (Dagger Division) headquartered at Baramulla
- 28th Infantry Division (Vajr Division) headquartered at Kupwara
- One Bhairav Battalion
- Kilo Force, Victor Force of the Rashtriya Rifles come under the operational control of the corps

== General Officers Commanding (GOC) ==
| Rank | Name | Appointment Date | Left office | Unit of Commission | References |
|---|---|---|---|---|---|
| Lieutenant General | S. M. Shrinagesh | September 1948 | January 1948 | 19th Hyderabad Regiment | |
| Lieutenant General | Mohinder Singh Wadalia | 1957 | 1959 | 19th Hyderabad Regiment | |
| Lieutenant General | Shiv Dev Verma | January 1959 | 1961 | 16th Light Cavalry | |
| Lieutenant General | Bikram Singh | June 1961 | 22 November 1963 | 13th Frontier Force Rifles | |
| Lieutenant General | Kashmir Singh Katoch | November 1963 | 7 June 1966 | 13th Frontier Force Rifles | |
| Lieutenant General | Sartaj Singh | 1970 | January 1973 | Regiment of Artillery | |
| Lieutenant General | R K Jasbir Singh | | | 4th Gorkha Rifles | (Note: Though commissioned into the 4th Gorkha Rifles, he was later transferred to the Jat Regiment) |
| Lieutenant General | Prem Nath Hoon | 3 August 1983 | 1984 | Sikh Regiment | (Note: Though commissioned into the 4 Sikh, he was later transferred to the Dogra Regiment) |
| Lieutenant General | Mohammad Ahmed Zaki | October 1989 | June 1991 | Maratha Light Infantry | |
| Lieutenant General | Sundararajan Padmanabhan | July 1993 | February 1995 | Regiment of Artillery | |
| Lieutenant General | J S Dhillon | March 1995 | | Maratha Light Infantry | |
| Lieutenant General | Krishan Pal | 1999 | January 2000 | Assam Regiment | |
| Lieutenant General | John Ranjan Mukherjee | January 2000 | 17 April 2002 | Assam Regiment | |
| Lieutenant General | Vinayak Gopal Patankar | 18 April 2002 | 17 July 2003 | Regiment of Artillery | |
| Lieutenant General | Nirbhay Sharma | 18 July 2003 | 14 June 2005 | Parachute Regiment | |
| Lieutenant General | Sarabjit Singh Dhillon | 15 June 2005 | 22 October 2006 | The Grenadiers | |
| Lieutenant General | Amarjeet Singh Sekhon | 23 October 2006 | 23 November 2007 | Sikh Light Infantry | |
| Lieutenant General | Mukesh Sabharwal | 24 November 2007 | 2008 | Rajput Regiment | |
| Lieutenant General | Bikram Singh | 2008 | 31 October 2009 | Sikh Light Infantry | |
| Lieutenant General | N C Marwah | 30 November 2009 | 3 December 2010 | Kumaon Regiment | |
| Lieutenant General | Syed Ata Hasnain | 4 December 2010 | 8 June 2012 | The Garhwal Rifles | |
| Lieutenant General | Om Prakash | 9 June 2012 | 9 June 2013 | Kumaon Regiment | |
| Lieutenant General | Gurmit Singh | 10 June 2013 | 25 June 2014 | Assam Regiment | |
| Lieutenant General | Subrata Saha | 26 June 2014 | 25 November 2015 | Assam Regiment | |
| Lieutenant General | Satish Dua | 26 November 2015 | 31 October 2016 | Jammu and Kashmir Light Infantry | |
| Lieutenant General | Jaswinder Singh Sandhu | 1 November 2016 | 14 December 2017 | 5th Gorkha Rifles (Frontier Force) | |
| Lieutenant General | Anil Kumar Bhatt | 15 December 2017 | 7 February 2019 | 9th Gorkha Rifles | |
| Lieutenant General | Kanwal Jeet Singh Dhillon | 8 February 2019 | 29 February 2020 | Rajputana Rifles | |
| Lieutenant General | B. S. Raju | 1 March 2020 | 17 March 2021 | Jat Regiment | |
| Lieutenant General | Devendra Pratap Pandey | 17 March 2021 | 9 May 2022 | Sikh Light Infantry | |
| Lieutenant General | Amardeep Singh Aujla | 9 May 2022 | 14 June 2023 | Rajputana Rifles | |
| Lieutenant General | Rajiv Ghai | 15 June 2023 | 5 October 2024 | Kumaon Regiment | |
| Lieutenant General | Prashant Srivastava | 5 October 2024 | 30 April 2026 | Parachute Regiment | |
| Lieutenant General | Balbir Singh | 1 May 2026 | Incumbent | 4th Gorkha Rifles | |
