= Om Prakash (general) =

Lieutenant General, Indian Army

Lieutenant General Om Prakash PVSM, UYSM, AVSM, SM
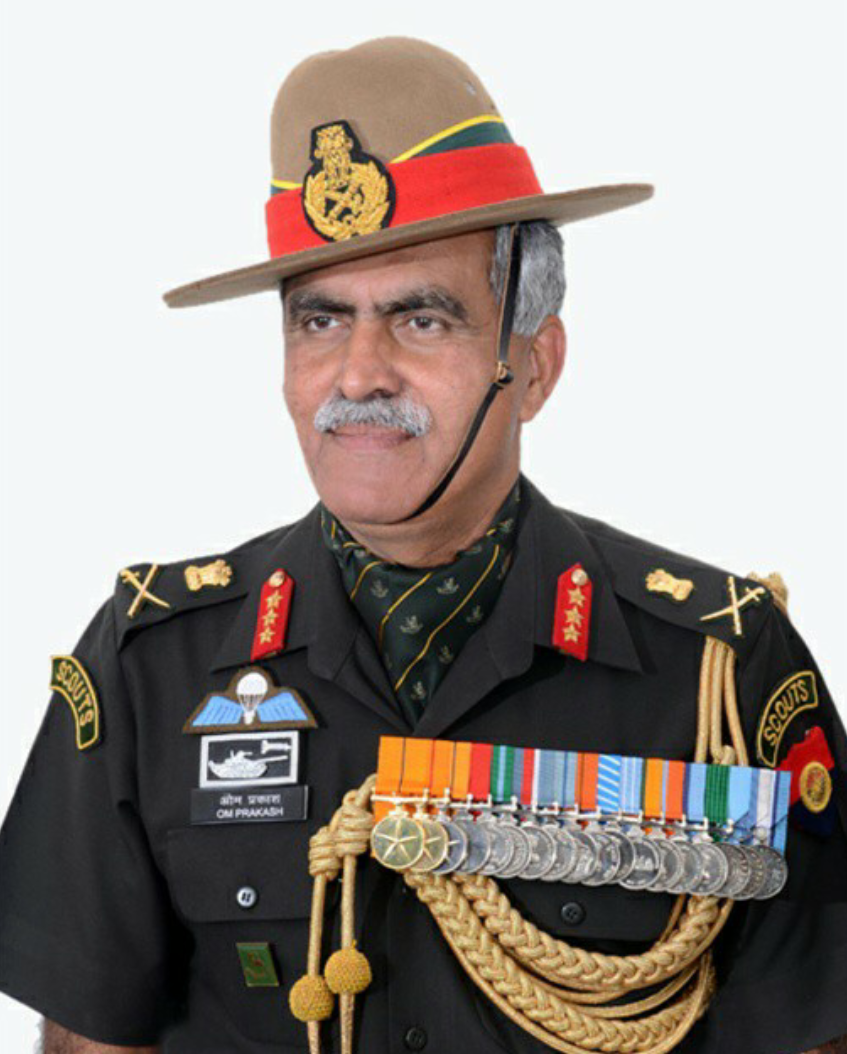
- Spouse: Sarla Chhillar
- Military career
- Allegiance: India
- Branch: Indian Army
- Service years: 1976–2015
- Rank: Lieutenant General
- Unit: 11 Kumaon Regiment
- Commands: XV Corps; 25th Infantry Division (India); Siachen Brigade
- Awards: Param Vishisht Seva Medal; Uttam Yudh Seva Medal; Ati Vishisht Seva Medal; Sena Medal

Lieutenant General Om Prakash, PVSM, UYSM, AVSM, SM is a retired General of the Indian Army. He was the commander of the XV Corps in 2012.

== Early life and education ==
He was born on 10 April 1955 to Kasturi Devi and C H Roopchand in Bahrai village of Jhajjar district, Haryana.^{[3][5][6][7]} He completed his primary education in his native village and then moved to Sainik School, Bijapur, Karnataka for his secondary education in 1967 before joining the National Defence Academy in 1972. He holds Master of Science Degree in Defence Studies and Master of Philosophy Degree in Defence Studies and Strategic Studies. He has also attended United Nations Peace Support Mission Planning Course, at Nairobi, Kenya, International Humanitarian Law Course at International Institute of Humanitarian Law San Remo, Italy, Defence Services Staff College, Wellington and National Defence College, New Delhi.

== Military career ==
He has served extensively in Counter Terrorist & Counter Insurgency Operational areas in Jammu & Kashmir and North East India. He has even served with Indian Peace Keeping Force (IPKF) in Sri Lanka and headed a United Nations Special Force in Iraq. He commanded the Chinar Corps and was awarded the Uttam Yudh Sewa Medal. He also commanded an Infantry Division (Ace of Spades Division) in Jammu and Kashmir and was awarded the Ati Vishisht Sewa Medal. He commanded Siachen Brigade, and was bestowed with the gallantry award of Sena Medal and commanded a Battalion along Indo-Tibet border in Arunachal Pradesh.

== Awards and decorations ==

	Param Vishisht Seva Medal	Uttam Yudh Seva Medal	
Ati Vishisht Seva Medal	Sena Medal	Samanya Seva Medal	Special Service Medal
Siachen Glacier Medal	Operation Vijay Medal	Sainya Seva Medal	High Altitude Service Medal
Videsh Seva Medal	50th Anniversary of Independence Medal	30 Years Long Service Medal	20 Years Long Service Medal
9 Years Long Service Medal	UN Headquarters Service Medal	United Nations Special Service Medal	UN Peacekeeping Force in Cyprus Medal

The General has received the following medals and decorations throughout his military career:

- Param Vishisht Seva Medal
- Uttam Yudh Seva Medal
- Ati Vishisht Seva Medal
- Sena Medal
