= List of cantonments in India =

Several cities in the Indian subcontinent, including Ahmedabad, Ambala, Bellary, Belgaum, Bangalore, Danapur, Jabalpur, Kanpur, Bathinda, Delhi, Nilgiris, Chennai, Mumbai, Pune, Meerut, Ramgarh, Secunderabad, Kasauli and Trichy, contained large cantonments of the former British Indian Army, with Meerut and Ramgarh being two of the most important cantonments in Northern India, second only to the headquarters at Rawalpindi (now in Pakistan). Meerut was established in 1803, and for 150 years was the largest cantonment in the region. Although cantonments in India were considered to be semi-permanent in the 18th and 19th centuries, by the turn of the 20th century, they had transitioned to being permanent garrisons. They were further entrenched as such, via the military reforms of Lord Kitchener in 1903, and the Cantonments Act of 1924.

At India's Independence in 1947, India had 56 cantonments. After this India added 6 cantonments the last being Ajmer Cantonment in 1962, taking the total number to 62. They covered an area of 161,000 acres (650 km^{2}).

As of 2019, there were sixty-one "notified cantonments" in India, occupying an area of 157,000 acres (640 km^{2}): twenty-five in Central Command, nineteen in Southern Command, thirteen in Western Command, four in Eastern Command, and one in Northern Command.

On 24 July 2024, a press release notified that, in order to move on from older Colonial-era concepts, Ministry of Defence has decided to give up responsibility to consider to excise civil areas of certain Cantonments and merge them with neighbouring State municipalities. As of then, there were 58 Cantonments of which 10 were to be handed over in the first phase. The administration of civil areas was to be handed over from Cantonment Boards to the neighbouring Municipalities while the military region was to remain with the Armed Forces. However, on 27 April 2024, KhasYol had become the first cantonment board to be "de-notified".

On 2 September 2024, it was reported that paperwork are being completed to handover civilian areas of Cantonments from the Indian Army. The Cantonments include Dehradun, Deolali, Nasirabad, Babina, Ajmer, Ramgarh, Mathura, Shahjahanpur, Clement Town and Fatehgarh. The report sain, "Indian Army's Central Command, South Western Command and Southern Command are in the process of completing the hand over exercise in coordination with Uttarakhand, Maharashtra, Rajasthan, Jharkhand and Uttar Pradesh governments."

Major cantonments and garrisons include the following:

== Notified cantonments ==
- Central Command
1. Agra Cantonment, Uttar Pradesh
2. Almora Cantonment, Uttarakhand
3. Ayodhya Cantonment, Uttar Pradesh
4. Bareilly Cantonment, Uttar Pradesh
5. Chakrata Cantonment, Uttarakhand
6. Clement Town Cantonment, Uttarakhand (To be denotified)
7. Danapur Cantonment, Bihar
8. Dehradun Cantonment, Uttarakhand (To be denotified)
9. Fatehgarh Cantonment, Uttar Pradesh (To be denotified)
10. Gopalpur Cantonment, Odisha
11. Jabalpur Cantonment, Madhya Pradesh
12. Kanpur Cantonment, Uttar Pradesh
13. Landour Cantonment, Uttarakhand
14. Lansdowne Cantonment, Uttarakhand
15. Lucknow Cantonment, Uttar Pradesh
16. Mathura Cantonment, Uttar Pradesh (To be denotified)
17. Meerut Cantonment, Uttar Pradesh
18. Mhow Cantonment, Madhya Pradesh
19. Nainital Cantonment, Uttarakhand
20. Pachmarhi Cantonment, Madhya Pradesh
21. Prayagraj Cantonment, Uttar Pradesh
22. Ramgarh Cantonment, Jharkhand (To be denotified)
23. Ranikhet Cantonment, Uttarakhand
24. Roorkee Cantonment, Uttarakhand
25. Shahajahanpur Cantonment, Uttar Pradesh (To be denotified)
26. Varanasi Cantonment, Uttar Pradesh
- Southern Command
1. Ahmedabad Cantonment, Gujarat
2. Ahmednagar Cantonment, Maharashtra
3. Ajmer Cantonment, Rajasthan (To be denotified)
4. Aurangabad Cantonment, Maharashtra
5. Babina Cantonment, Jhansi, Uttar Pradesh (To be denotified)
6. Belgaum Cantonment, Karnataka
7. Bellary Cantonment, Karnataka (Inactive, De-notified)
8. Dehu Road Cantonment, Maharashtra
9. Deolali Cantonment, Maharashtra (To be denotified)
10. Jhansi Cantonment, Uttar Pradesh
11. Kamptee Cantonment, Maharashtra
12. Kannur Cantonment, Kerala
13. Kirkee Cantonment, Maharashtra
14. Morar Cantonment, Gwalior, Madhya Pradesh
15. Nasirabad Cantonment, Rajasthan (To be denotified)
16. Pune Cantonment, Maharashtra
17. Sagar Cantonment, Madhya Pradesh
18. Secunderabad Cantonment, Telangana
19. St. Thomas Mount Cantonment, Chennai, Tamil Nadu
20. Wellington Cantonment, Tamil Nadu
- Western Command
1. Ambala Cantonment, Haryana
2. Amritsar Cantonment, Punjab
3. Bakloh Cantonment, Chamba District, Himachal Pradesh
4. Dagshai Cantonment, Himachal Pradesh
5. Dalhousie Cantonment, Himachal Pradesh
6. Delhi Cantonment, Delhi
7. Ferozepur Cantonment, Punjab
8. Jalandhar Cantonment, Punjab
9. Jammu Cantonment, Jammu and Kashmir
10. Jutogh Cantonment, Shimla, Himachal Pradesh
11. Kasauli Cantonment, Himachal Pradesh
12. Subathu Cantonment, Shimla Hills, Himachal Pradesh
13. KhasYol Cantonment, Dharamshala, Himachal Pradesh (de-notified on 2023)
- Eastern Command
1. Barrackpore, West Bengal
2. Dum Dum Cantonment, West Bengal (Inactive, De-notified)
3. Jalapahar, Darjeeling, West Bengal
4. Lebong, Darjeeling, West Bengal
5. Shillong Cantonment, Meghalaya
- Northern Command
1. Badamibagh Cantonment, Jammu and Kashmir

== Unlisted military cantonments ==
1. Abohar Cantonment (Abohar, Punjab)
2. Akhnoor Cantonment (Akhnoor, Jammu and Kashmir)
3. Baddowal Cantonment (Ludhiana, Punjab)
4. Bangalore Cantonment (Bangalore, Karnataka)
5. Bikaner Cantonment (Bikaner, Rajasthan)
6. Bharatpur Cantonment (Rajasthan)
7. Bhatinda Cantonment (Bhatinda, Punjab)
8. Binnaguri Cantonment (West Bengal)
9. Bhuj Cantonment (Bhuj, Gujarat)
10. Bhopal Cantonment (Madhya Pradesh)
11. Beas Military Station (Punjab)
12. Chandimandir Cantonment (Chandigarh)
13. Dipatoli Cantonment (Ranchi, Jharkhand)
14. Faridkot Cantonment (Faridkot, Punjab)
15. Fazilka Cantonment (Fazilka, Punjab)
16. Gandhinagar Cantonment (Gandhinagar, Gujarat)
17. Gopalpur Cantonment (Brahmapur, Orissa)
18. Hisar Cantonment (Hisar, Haryana)
19. Itarana Cantonment (Alwar, Rajasthan)
20. Jaipur Cantonment (Jaipur, Rajasthan)
21. Jaisalmer Cantonment (Jaisalmer, Rajasthan)
22. Jodhpur Cantonment (Rajasthan)
23. Joshimath Cantonment (Joshimath, Uttarakhand)
24. Kapurthala Cantonment (Kapurthala, Punjab)
25. Khasa Cantonment (Amritsar, Punjab)
26. Kollam Cantonment (Kollam, India)
27. Ludhiana Cantonment (Punjab)
28. Mamun Cantonment (Pathankot, Punjab)
29. Missamari Cantonment (Missamari, Assam)
30. Nagrota Cantonment (Nagrota, Jammu & Kashmir)
31. Narengi Cantonment (Guwahati, Assam)
32. Pathankot Cantonment (Pathankot, Punjab)
33. Patiala Cantonment (Punjab)
34. Pithoragarh Cantonment (Pithoragarh , Uttarakhand)
35. Shahjahanpur Cantonment (Shahjahanpur, Uttar Pradesh)
36. Solmara Cantonment (Tezpur, Assam)
37. Sri Ganganagar Cantonment (Sri Ganganagar, Rajasthan)
38. Suratgarh Cantonment (Suratgarh, Rajasthan)
39. Thiruvananthapuram Cantonment (Thiruvananthapuram, Kerala)
40. Tibri Cantonment (Gurdaspur, Punjab)
41. Udhampur Cantonment (Udhampur, Jammu & Kashmir)
42. Udaipur Cantonment (Rajasthan)
43. Vadodara Cantonment (Vadodara, Gujarat)
44. Varanasi Cantonment, Uttar Pradesh, Central Command
45. Siliguri Cantonment(West Bengal)
46. Shillong Cantonment(Meghalaya)
