= Directorate General Defence Estates =

Regulatory body in India

The Directorate General, Defence Estates (abbreviate as: DGDE) is the main Indian regulatory and advisory body that provides inputs on matters of Cantonments and defence land matters to the Ministry of Defence and service headquarters, i.e., Indian Army, Indian Navy, Indian Air Force and other organizations under Ministry of Defence of Government of India. DGDE is the headquarters of the Indian Defence Estates Service.

== Functions of DGDE ==
The main responsibilities of DGDE are acquisition of lands, resettlement and rehabilitation of displaced persons, and hiring and requisitioning of lands and buildings.

== Civil Service ==
The personnel of Indian Defence Estates Service (IDES) (an organised Group 'A' Central Civil Service, requirement by UPSC) are main officers who manage the DGDE and Cantonments in whole India, they works under Ministry of Defence.

DGDE has under its jurisdiction six Principal Directorates namely- Principal Directors, Central, Eastern, Northern, Southern, South-western and Western Command. Under the Principal Directorates there are 39 Defence Estates Offices and 4 ADEO Circles for management of Defence lands in the country.

== The Cantonment ==
=== Management of Cantonments ===
There are total 61 Cantonment Boards or simply Cantonments in India under DGDE. These are local bodies responsible for providing civic administration and implementing the Central Govt schemes of social welfare, public health, hygiene, safety, water supply, sanitation, urban renewal and education.

These Cantonments are managed by an IDES officers. The head IDES officer of an Cantonment posted as CEO. The term of office of a member of a board is five years. A cantonment board consists of eight elected members, three nominated military members, three ex-officio members (station commander, garrison engineer and senior executive medical officer), and one representative of the district magistrate.

There are 62 Cantonment Boards in India, managed by Directorate General Defence Estates (DGDE).

Cantonments are divided into four categories-

1. Category I – population exceeds fifty thousand
2. Category II – population exceeds ten thousand, but does not exceed fifty thousand
3. Category III – population exceeds two thousand five hundred, but does not exceed ten thousand
4. Category IV – population does not exceed two thousand five hundred.

=== Functions of cantonment ===
The cantonment takes care of mandatory duties such as provision of public health, water supply, sanitation, primary education, and street lighting etc. As the resources are owned by Government of India, (1) For every cantonment there shall be a Cantonment Board. (2) Every Board shall be deemed to be a municipality under clause (e) of article 243P of the Constitution for the purposes of- (a) receiving grants and allocations; or (b) implementing the Central Government schemes of social welfare, public health, hygiene, safety, water supply, sanitation, urban renewal and education. It is the duty of the president of the cantonment board:

- unless prevented by reasonable cause, to convene and preside at all meetings of the board and to regulate the conduct of business;
- to control, direct and supervise the financial and executive administration of the board;
- to perform all the duties and exercise all the powers specially imposed or conferred on the president by or under this act; and
- subject to any restrictions, limitations and conditions imposed by this Act, to exercise executive power for the purpose of carrying out the provisions of this Act.
- in case of gross misconduct during the course of meeting, to suspend a member other than a chief executive officer from attending the un-conduct part of the meeting of the Board.

=== List of cantonment ===
==== Northern region ====
Himachal Pradesh

- Bakloh (near Chamba)
- Dagshai (near Solan)
- Dalhousie Cantonment (Near Chamba)
- Jutogh (near Shimla)
- Kasauli (Solan)
- Sabathu (near Solan)

Jammu and Kashmir

- Badami Bagh (near Srinagar)
- Jammu

==== North-western region ====
Delhi

- Delhi

Haryana

- Ambala

Punjab

- Amritsar
- Firozpur
- Jalandhar

==== North-Central region ====
Uttarakhand;

- Almora
- Chakrata
- Clement Town (near Dehradun)
- Dehradun
- Landour (near Mussoorie)
- Lansdowne
- Nainital
- Ranikhet
- Roorkee

==== Central region ====
Madhya Pradesh;

- Jabalpur
- Mhow
- Morar
- Pachmarhi
- Sagar

Uttar Pradesh

- Agra
- Ayodhya
- Babina (near Jhansi)
- Bareilly
- Jhansi
- Kanpur
- Lucknow
- Fatehgarh
- Mathura
- Meerut
- Prayagraj
- Shahjahanpur
- Varanasi

==== Western region ====
Rajasthan

- Ajmer
- Nasirabad (near Ajmer)

Gujarat

- Ahmedabad

Maharashtra

- Ahmednagar
- Aurangabad
- Dehu Road (in Pune)
- Deolali (near Nashik)
- Kamptee (near Nagpur)
- Khadki (in Pune)
- Camp (in Pune)

==== Eastern region ====
Bihar

- Danapur

Jharkhand

- Ramgarh

Meghalaya

- Shillong

West Bengal

- Barrackpur
- Jalapahar (in Darjeeling)
- Lebong (in Darjeeling)

==== Southern region ====
Karnataka

- Belgaum

Kerala

- Kannur

Tamil Nadu

- St.Thomas Mount-cum-Pallavaram (in Chennai)
- Wellington

Telangana

- Secunderabad

== See also ==
- Indian Armed Forces
- Ministry of Defence
- Defence industry of India
- Chief of Defence Staff
- Directorate of Ordnance (Coordination & Services)
- Indian Ordnance Factories Service
- Indian Defence Estates Service
- Indian Defence Accounts Service
- Indian Armed Forces Tri-Service Commands
- Defence Research and Development Organisation
