= Infantry of the Indian Army =

Infantry
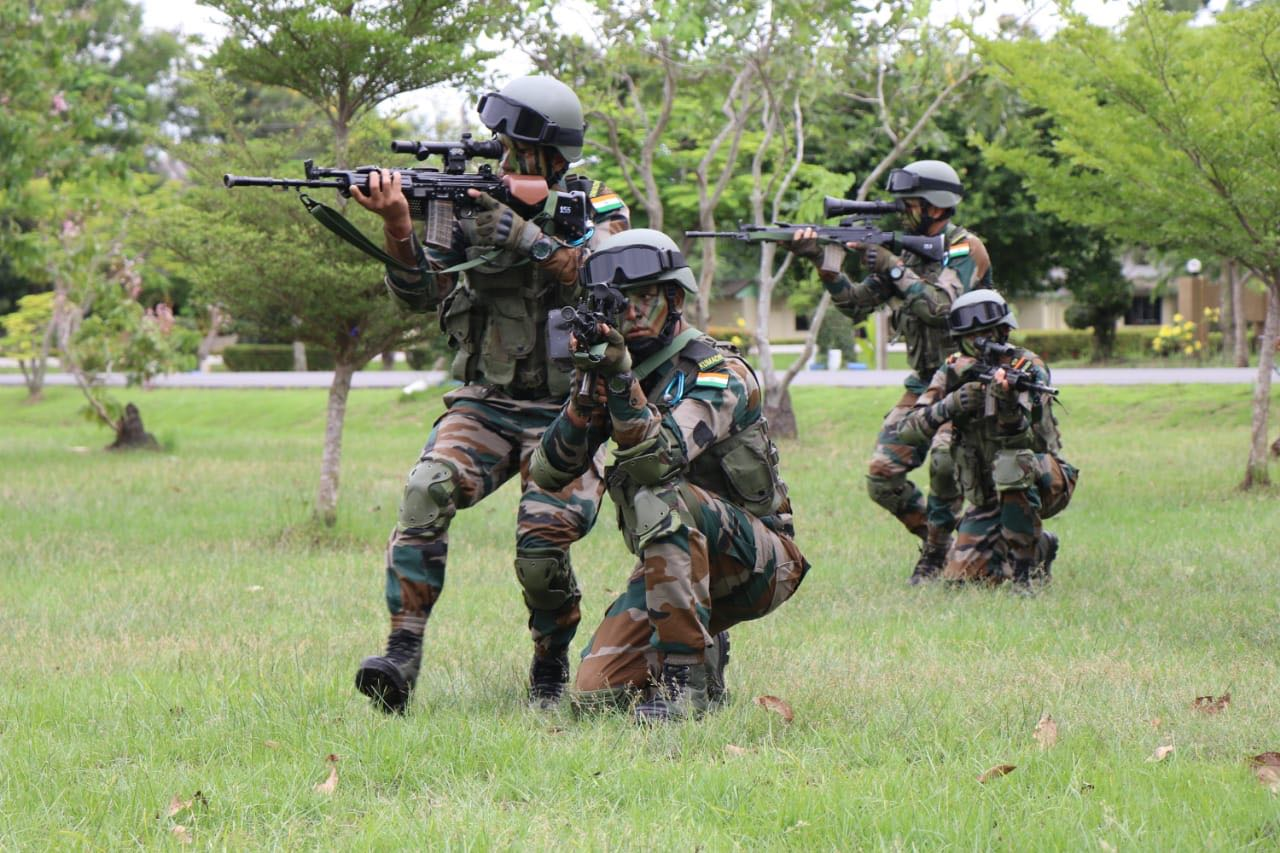
- Active: 1758–present
- Country: British India; India
- Allegiance: Republic of India
- Branch: British East India Company; British Indian Army; Indian Army
- Type: Infantry
- Regimental colours: Red
- Anniversaries: 27 October (Infantry Day)

The Infantry of the Indian Army is the largest arm of the Indian Army. It consists of personnel, who historically have engaged in ground combat on foot. It presently also consists of mechanised and airborne infantry.

== History ==
The infantry was historically the first combat arm in any army. The present regiments of the Indian Army trace their origin to the British East India Company, when Indians were employed to protect their trading stations. From the middle of the eighteenth century, the three presidencies of the company began to maintain armies at Calcutta (Bengal Army), Madras (Madras Army) and Bombay (Bombay Army). The presidency armies had their own Regiments and cadre of European officers. There were European regiments, where both the officers and men were Europeans, as well as 'Native' regiments, which were officered by Europeans, but the other ranks were Indians. The recruitment of Indians was usually done locally, with battalions each drawn from single castes, or and from specific communities or geographical areas. This pattern of recruitment continues to this day in many of the older regiments. Following the Indian Rebellion of 1857, 55 out of 70 infantry regiments of the Bengal Army were disbanded and more infantry regiment raised from Punjab and those including Gorkhas. Indian troops maintained internal security in the country, fought for the defence of the North-West Frontier and were sent abroad to take part many conflict zones of the British empire. The infantrymen subsequently served in the two world wars with distinction.

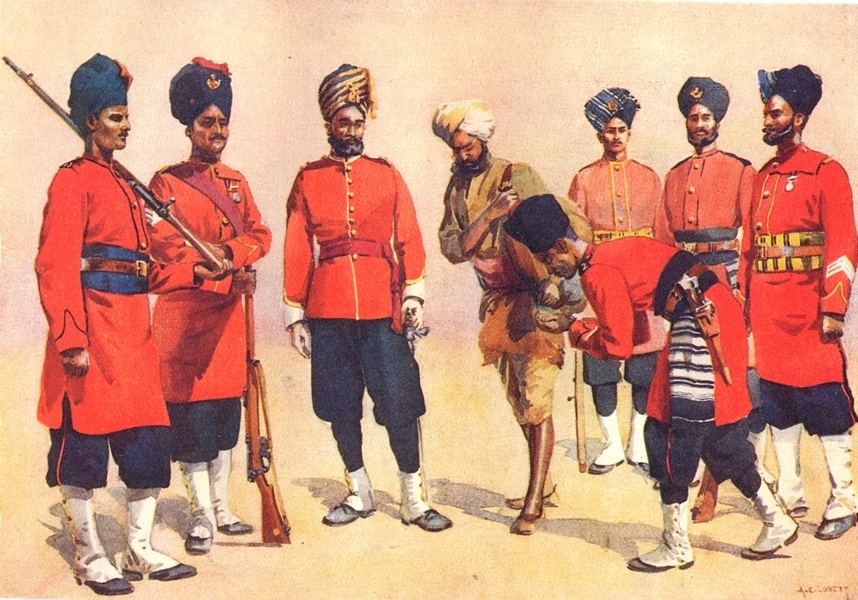
Rajput soldiers of the British Indian Army, 1911

== Regimental organisation ==
Each regiment consists of more than one infantry battalion. A battalion is commanded by an officer of the rank of Colonel. The battalion is further divided into four rifle companies, one headquarters company and at times a support company. Each company is commanded by an officer of the rank of a Major or a Captain. A company will have three platoons, which in turn will have three sections. In addition, each battalion has a Ghatak platoon, which is a special operations capable reconnaissance platoon. An infantry battalion usually has a strength of 15-20 officers and 650-800 other ranks. The latter includes Junior Commissioned Officers (JCOs), Non Commissioned Officers (NCOs) and other ranks (ORs).

=== New formations and units ===
From 2025, keeping in nature of the evolving nature of the battlefield, a drone platoon would be introduced to each infantry battalion in the service. Each 'Ashni drone platoon' would employ 20–25 soldiers and be equipped with loitering munitions and drones to perform intelligence, surveillance and reconnaissance (ISR) roles. In addition, 'Bhairav Light Commando Battalions' are being raised. This battalion would have a strength of 250 personnel, including 78 officers, which is much lesser than that of a standard infantry battalion or a Parachute Regiment battalion, which include 800 and 620 soldiers each. These agile and compact battalions, evolving from the Ghatak platoon concept, are designed as shock troops to undertake clandestine missions or deliver surprise strikes under high-risk conditions beyond the enemy lines to inflict maximum damage.

== Regiments ==
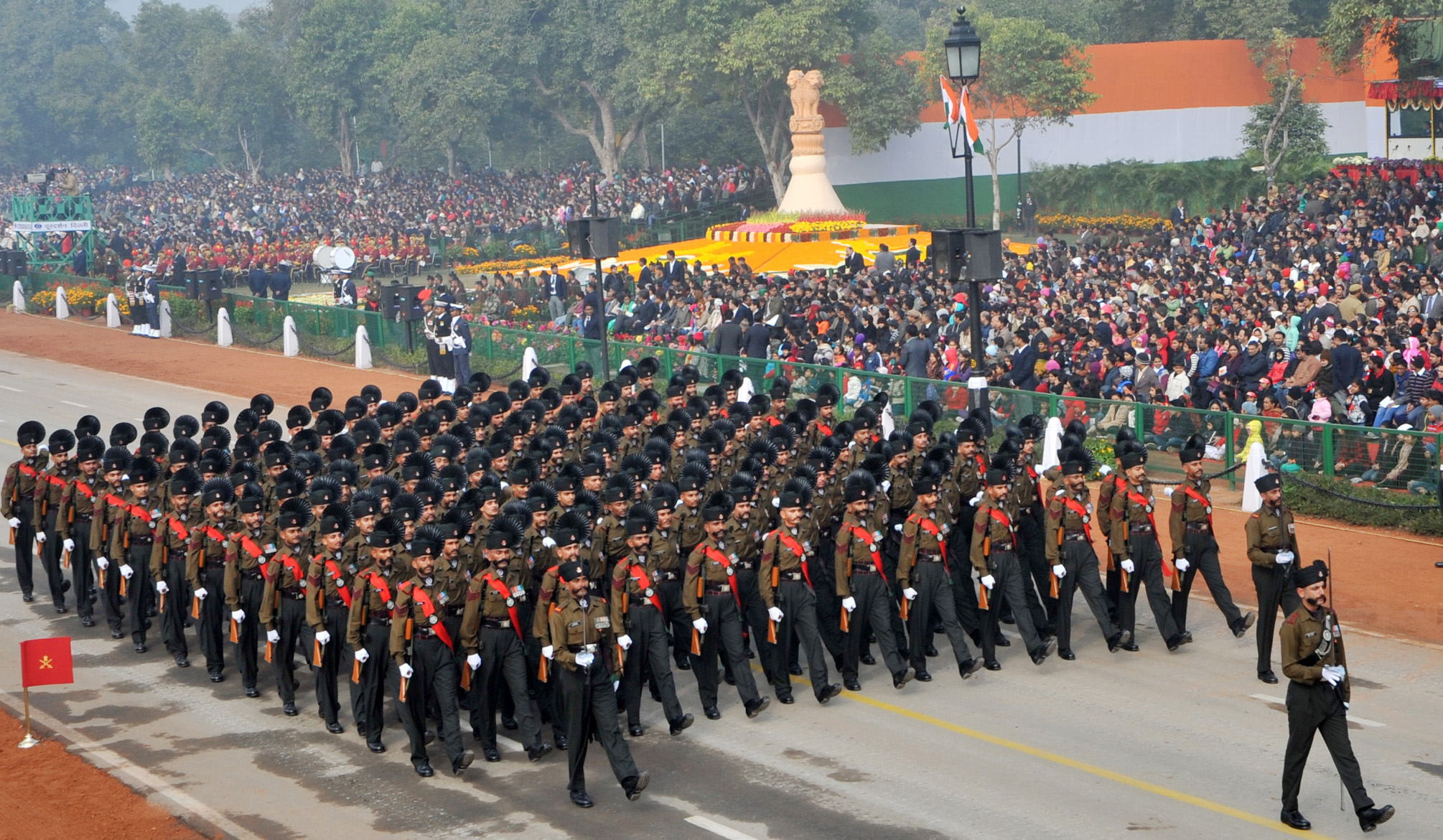
Rajputana Rifles contingent during the Republic Day parade, 2014

The Indian Army has four types of regiments based on class composition -

- Single Class- These regiments have troops from a single class, e.g. Dogra Regiment. This group also includes three scout units (highlighted in green), which are affiliated with an existing regiment. These units includes recruits only from a small geographical area and have a role of serving only in the border region from where they have been raised.
- Fixed Class - They are composed of troops from two or more ethnic groups. The sub-units have troops from a single ethnic group e.g. Rajputana Rifles are recruited primarily from Jat and Rajput populations.
- Mixed Fixed Class - They are similar to the Fixed Class regiments but the sub-units have troops from more than one ethnicity. e.g. the Punjab Regiment comprises Sikhs, Punjabis and Dogras but all function in mixed sub-units.
- All India All Class- These units contain a heterogeneous mix of all Indian classes and are generally those units, which have been raised after independence. e.g. Brigade of the Guards.

Based on role, the regiments can be classified as-

- Regular infantry
- Airborne infantry
- Mechanised Infantry

The regiments, date of formation, regimental centre, number of battalions (regular, Territorial Army (TA) and Rashtriya Rifles (RR), motto and war cry are as follows.

Regular and airborne infantry

Regiment	Active from	Regimental centre	Reg. Bn.	TA Bn.	RR Bn.	Motto	War cry
Madras Regiment	1758	Wellington Cantonment, Tamil Nadu	21	3	4	"Swadharme nidhanam shreyah" ("it is a glory to die doing one's duty")	"Vira Madrasi, adi kollu, adi kollu" ("brave Madrasi, strike and kill, strike and kill!")
Rajputana Rifles	1775	Delhi Cantonment	19	2	4	"Virabhogya vasundhara" ("the brave shall inherit the earth")	"Raja Ramachandra ki jai" ("victory to King Ramachandra")
Rajput Regiment	1778	Fatehgarh, Uttar Pradesh	20	2	4	"Sarvatra vijay" ("victory everywhere")	"Bol Bajrang Bali ki jai" ("say victory to Lord Hanuman")
Dogra Regiment	1877	Ayodhya Cantonment, Uttar Pradesh	20¶	4	4	"Kartavyam anvatma" ("duty before death")	"Jwala Mata ki jai" ("victory to Goddess Jwala")
Sikh Regiment	1846	Ramgarh Cantonment, Jharkhand	20	3	3	"Nishchay kar apni jit karun" ("with determination, I will be triumphant")	"Bole so nihal, Sat Shri Akal" ("shout aloud in ecstasy, true is the great eternal God!") "Waheguruji ka khalsa, Waheguruji ki fateh" ("the khalsa of Waheguru is victorious")
Jat Regiment	1795	Bareilly Cantonment, Uttar Pradesh	22	2	4	"Sangathan wa virata" ("unity and valour")	"Jat balwan, jai bhagwan" ("the Jat is strong, victory to God")
Parachute Regiment	1945	Bangalore Cantonment, Karnataka	15	2	1	"Shatrujit" ("the conqueror")	"Balidana param dharma" ("sacrifice, supreme duty")
Punjab Regiment	1761	Ramgarh Cantonment, Jharkhand	21	3	4	"Sthal wa jal" ("by land and sea")	"Bole so nihal, Sat Shri Akal" ("shout aloud in ecstasy, true is the great eternal God!"); "Jwala Mata ki jai" ("victory to Goddess Jwala")
The Grenadiers	1778	Jabalpur Cantonment, Madhya Pradesh	23	2	4	"Nam, namak, nishan" ("name, salt, mark")	"Sarvada shaktishali" ("always strong")
Sikh Light Infantry	1944	Fatehgarh, Uttar Pradesh	19	3	3	"Deg tegh fateh" ("victory to charity and arms")	"Bole so nihal, Sat Shri Akal" ("shout aloud in ecstasy, true is the great eternal God!")
Maratha Light Infantry	1768	Belgaum Cantonment, Karnataka	22	2	4	"Duty, honour, courage"	"Bola Shri Chhatrapati Shivaji Maharaj ki jai ("say victory to King Shivaji); "Temlai Mata ki jai" ("victory to Goddess Temlai"); Hara Hara Mahadeva ("hail to Lord Shiva")
Garhwal Rifles	1887	Lansdowne, Uttarakhand	21¶	2	3	"Yuddhaya kritanishchayah" ("fight with determination")	"Badrivishal lal ki jai" ("victory to the sons of great Lord Badrinath")
Kumaon Regiment	1813	Ranikhet, Uttarakhand	20¶	2	3	"Parakramo vijayate" ("valour triumphs")	"Kalika Mata ki jai" ("victory to Goddess Kali"); "Bajrang Bali ki jai" ("victory to Lord Hanuman"); "Dada Kishan ki jai" ("victory to Lord Krishna")
Assam Regiment	1941	Shillong Cantonment, Meghalaya	15	5	3	"Assam vikram" ("unique valour")	"Rhino charge"
Bihar Regiment	1941	Danapur Cantonment, Bihar	22	2	4	"Karma hi dharma" ("work is worship")	"Bajrang Bali ki jai" ("victory to Lord Hanuman"); "Birsa Munda ki jai" ("victory to Birsa Munda")
Mahar Regiment	1815	Sagar Cantonment, Madhya Pradesh	21	3	3	"Yash siddhi" ("success and attainment")	"Bolo Hindustan ki jai" ("say victory to India")
Jammu and Kashmir Rifles	1821	Jabalpur Cantonment, Madhya Pradesh	23	3	3	"Prashasta ranavirata" ("valour in battle is praiseworthy")	"Durga Mata ki jai" ("victory to Goddess Durga")
Jammu and Kashmir Light Infantry	1947	Srinagar, Jammu and Kashmir	15	3	-	"Balidanam vira lakshanam " ("sacrifice is a characteristic of the brave")	"Bharat Mata ki jai" ("victory to Mother India")
Naga Regiment	1970	Ranikhet, Uttarakhand	3	1	1	"Parakramo vijayate" ("valour triumphs")	"Jai Durga Naga" ("victory to Durga Naga")
1st Gorkha Rifles (The Malaun Regiment)	1815	Sabathu, Himachal Pradesh	6		1§	"Kayar hunu bhanda marnu ramro" ("better to die than live like a coward")	"Jai Ma Kali, ayo Gorkhali" ("hail Mother Kali, here come the Gorkhas")
3rd Gorkha Rifles	1815	Varanasi Cantonment, Uttar Pradesh	5	1§	1§	"Kayar hunu bhanda marnu ramro" ("better to die than live like a coward")	"Jai Ma Kali, ayo Gorkhali" ("hail Goddess Kali, here come the Gorkhas")
4th Gorkha Rifles	1857	Sabathu, Himachal Pradesh	5		1§	"Kayar hunu bhanda marnu ramro" ("better to die than live like a coward")	"Jai Ma Kali, ayo Gorkhali" ("hail Goddess Kali, here come the Gorkhas")
5th Gorkha Rifles (Frontier Force)	1858	Shillong Cantonment, Meghalaya	6		1§	"Shaurya evam nishtha" ("courage and determination")	"Jai Ma Kali, ayo Gorkhali" ("hail Goddess Kali, here come the Gorkhas")
8th Gorkha Rifles	1824	Shillong Cantonment, Meghalaya	5		1§	"Kayar hunu bhanda marnu ramro" ("better to die, than live like a coward")	"Jai Ma Kali, ayo Gorkhali" ("hail Goddess Kali, here come the Gorkhas")
9th Gorkha Rifles	1817	Varanasi Cantonment, Uttar Pradesh	5	1§	1§	"Kayar hunu bhanda marnu ramro" ("better to die, than live like a coward")	Jai Ma Kali, Ayo Gorkhali ("hail Goddess Kali, here come the Gorkhas")
11th Gorkha Rifles	1918–1922; from 1948	Lucknow, Uttar Pradesh	6	1		"Yatraham vijayastatra" ("victory resides where I reside")	"Jai Ma Kali, Ayo Gorkhali ("hail Goddess Kali, here come the Gorkhas")
Ladakh Scouts	1963	Leh, Ladakh	5				"Ki ki so so lhargyalo" ("victory to God")
Arunachal Scouts	2010	Pasighat, Arunachal Pradesh	2				
Sikkim Scouts	2013	Lucknow, Uttar Pradesh	2				

¶ The Dogra Regiment, Garhwal Rifles, Kumaon Regiment have a scout battalion each, in addition to the above-mentioned battalions. Arunachal Scouts is affiliated to Assam Regiment, Ladakh Scouts to Jammu and Kashmir Rifles and Sikkim Scouts is to 11 Gorkha Rifles.

§ Since the Gorkha Regiments have relatively smaller number of battalions, 1 Gorkha Rifles and 4 Gorkha Rifles provide troops for 15 Rashtriya Rifles battalion, 3 Gorkha Rifles and 9 Gorkha Rifles for 32 Rashtriya Rifles battalion, and 5 Gorkha Rifles and 8 Gorkha Rifles for 33 Rashtriya Rifles battalion. 3 Gorkha Rifles and 9 Gorkha Rifles are affiliated to 137 Composite Eco-Task Force Battalion (Territorial Army).

Mechanised infantry

Regiment	Active from	Regimental centre	Reg. Bn.	TA Bn.	RR Bn.	Motto	War cry
Brigade of the Guards	1949	Kamptee, Maharashtra	22	2	1	"Pehla hamesha pehla ("first, always first")	"Garud ka hun bol pyare" ("I am the son of Garuda, say my friend")
Mechanised Infantry Regiment	1979	Ahmednagar, Maharashtra	27			"Valour and faith"	"Bolo Bharat Mata ki jai" ("say victory to Mother India")

== Infantry School ==
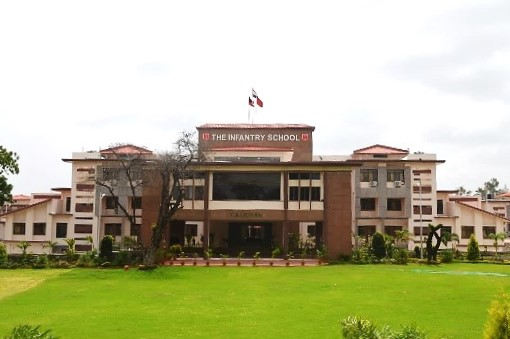
Kalidhar Block : The Infantry School

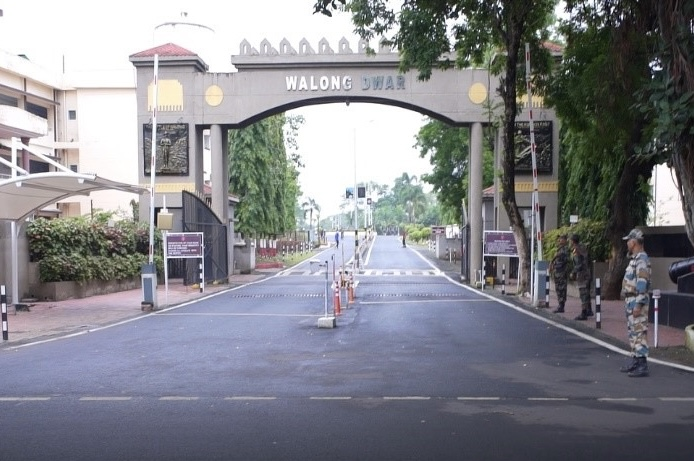
Walong Dwar : The Infantry School

The Infantry School is the oldest and largest training institution of the Indian Army, training over 7,000 Officers, Junior Commissioned Officers and Non-Commissioned Officers annually. The origin of the present school can be traced to The School of Musketry at Changla Gali (now in Pakistan), which was established in the year 1886. Between 1886 and 1948, before it inherited its present name and came to be located at Mhow, Madhya Pradesh, it passed through various names and locations: -

Year	Name	Loc
1886	School of Musketry	Changla Gali
1888	School of Musketry	Deolali
1913	School of Musketry	Satara and Belgaum
1919	Small Arms School	Pachmarhi
1931	Small Arms School	Ahmednagar
1933	Small Arms School	Saugar
1935	Indian NCO Training School	Jhansi
1937	Indian Infantry Platoon Commander's School	Faizabad
1940	Battle School and Tactics and Administration School	Dehradun
1948	Infantry School	Mhow

In 1964, the Commando Wing was raised under The Infantry School in Mhow, which along with the Platoon Commanders' Wing was moved to Belgaum (Karnataka) under Junior Leaders' Wing. In 1971, The College of Combat was carved out of The Infantry School. In 1993, Army Marksmanship Unit (AMU) was raised under The Infantry School, as a consequence of which the erstwhile Army Shooting Team (AST) was reorganised into AMU. The shooters of AMU are trained in precision shooting and have secured recognition at both national and international levels.

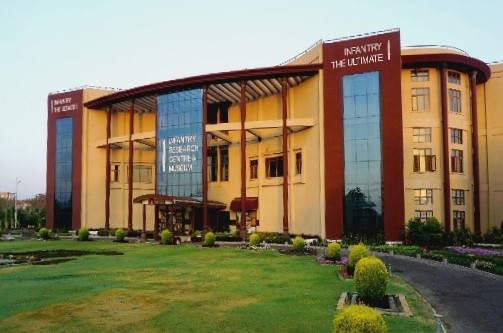
Infantry Museum and Research Centre

The Infantry School has three training wings namely Weapons and Trial Wing, Young Officers Wing and Junior Leaders Wing (at Belgaum). The Faculty of Studies (FOS) raised in 1992 undertakes conceptual studies. Trials of Infantry weapons, ammunition and equipment are also carried out at The Infantry School. A modern and a well-developed information technology setup at The Infantry School is utilized to provide latest training on IT and cyber awareness. The Infantry Museum and Research Centre has also been established in 2019.

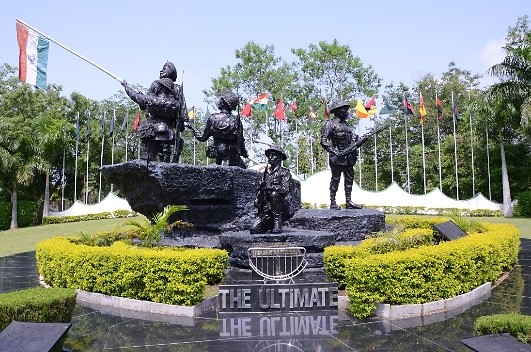
Infantry War Memorial

The Infantry School is the alma mater of all infantrymen and is cradle for Infantry tactics and small arms training for the Indian Army. It is the seat of learning and the think tank of the Infantry. It keeps abreast with the tactical and technical development in India and abroad on all matters pertaining to the Infantry war fighting. The following courses are conducted at the Infantry School -

- Young Officers Course
- Platoon Weapon Course
- Mortar Course
- Anti Tank and Guided Missile Course
- Medium Machine gun and Automatic Grenade launcher Course
- Section Commanders Course
- Automatic Data Processing Course
- Sniper Course, and
- Support Weapon Course

The Infantry School crest consists of a bayonet against a red background. The motto of The Infantry School is – Vijayen Gyanen Shauryen which translates to Victory through Learning and Courage.

== Infantry Day ==
Infantry Day (Shaurya Diwas) is celebrated on 27 October every year to commemorate the landing of infantry troops at Srinagar airport in 1947. This momentous act turned back the Pakistani invaders from the outskirts of Srinagar and was a turning point in the 1947 War.

== Journal ==
The Infantry (India) Journal is the professional journal of the Infantry fraternity. It was first published in 1950.

== See also ==
- List of regiments of the Indian Army (1903)
- List of regiments of the Indian Army (1922)
- List of infantry equipment of the Indian Army
