= Cantonment =

Military residential quarters, temporary or permanent

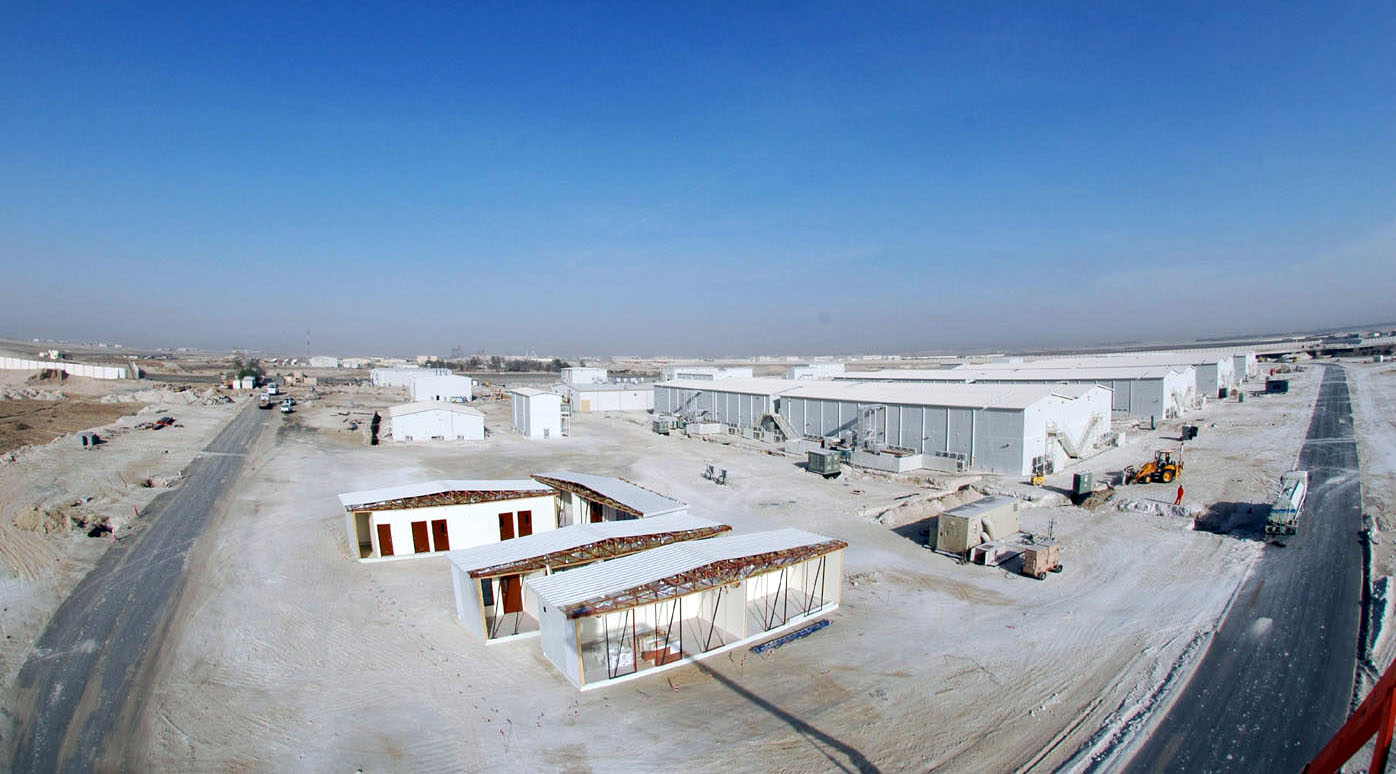
Cantonment of the USAF 380th Air Expeditionary Wing

A cantonment (/kænˈtɒnmənt/, /kænˈtoʊnmənt/, or UK: /kænˈtuːnmənt/) is a type of military base. In South Asia, a cantonment refers to a permanent military station (a term from the British Raj). In United States military parlance, a cantonment is a permanent residential section within a military installation.

The word cantonment, derived from the French word canton, meaning corner or district, refers to a temporary military or winter encampment. For example, at the start of the Waterloo campaign in 1815, while the Duke of Wellington's headquarters were in Brussels, most of his Anglo–allied army of 93,000 soldiers were cantoned, or stationed, to the south of Brussels.

== List of permanent cantonments ==
=== Afghanistan ===
The former Sherpur Cantonment in Kabul, Afghanistan, which was the site of the Siege of the Sherpur Cantonment (1879) in the Second Anglo-Afghan War (1878–1880), is now maintained as a British Army cemetery.

=== Bangladesh ===
In Bangladesh, cantonments are residential quarters for many military personnel as well as headquarters for different army units. A wide variety of military training is provided in Bangladesh cantonments:

- Alikadam Cantonment, Bandarban
- Bandarban Cantonment, Bandarban
- Chittagong Cantonment, Chittagong
- Comilla Cantonment, Comilla
- Dhaka Cantonment, Dhaka
- Dighinala Cantonment, Khagrachari
- Mithamain Cantonment, Kishoreganj
- Guimara Cantonment, Chittagong
- Halishahar Cantonment, Chittagong
- Jahanabad Cantonment, Khulna
- Jahangirabad Cantonment, Bogra
- Jalalabad Cantonment, Sylhet
- Jamuna Cantonment, Tangail
- Jessore Cantonment, Jessore
- Kaptai Cantonment, Kaptai
- Khagrachari Cantonment, Khagrachari
- Kholahati Cantonment, Dinajpur
- Lalmonirhat Cantonment, Lalmonirhat
- Barisal Cantonment, Barisal
- Majhira Cantonment, Bogra
- Mirpur Cantonment, Dhaka
- Mymensingh Cantonment, Mymensingh
- Padma Cantonment, Shariatpur
- Postogola Cantonment, Dhaka
- Qadirabad Cantonment, Natore
- Rajendrapur Cantonment, Gazipur
- Rajshahi Cantonment, Rajshahi
- Ramu Cantonment, Cox's Bazar
- Rangamati Cantonment, Rangamati
- Rangpur Cantonment, Rangpur
- Saidpur Cantonment, Nilphamari
- Savar Cantonment, Dhaka
- Shahid Salahuddin Cantonment, Ghatail
- Sylhet Cantonment, Sylhet

=== India ===
Several cities in the Indian subcontinent, including Ahmedabad, Ambala, Bellary, Belgaum, Bangalore, Danapur, Jabalpur, Kanpur, Bathinda, Delhi, Nilgiris, Chennai, Mumbai, Pune, Meerut, Ramgarh, Secunderabad, and Trichy, contained large cantonments of the former British Indian Army, with Meerut and Ramgarh being two of the most important cantonments in Northern India, second only to the headquarters at Rawalpindi (now in Pakistan). Meerut was established in 1803, and for 150 years was the largest cantonment in the region. Although cantonments in India were considered to be semi-permanent in the 18th and 19th centuries, by the turn of the 20th century, they had transitioned to being permanent garrisons. They were further entrenched as such, via the military reforms of Lord Kitchener in 1903, and the Cantonments Act of 1924.

At India's Independence in 1947, India had 56 cantonments. After this India added 6 cantonments the last being Ajmer Cantonment in 1962, taking the total number to 62. They covered an area of 161,000 acres (650 km^{2}).

As of 2019, there were sixty-one "notified cantonments" in India, occupying an area of 157,000 acres (640 km^{2}): twenty-five in Central Command, nineteen in Southern Command, thirteen in Western Command, four in Eastern Command, and one in Northern Command.

On 24 July 2024, a press release notified that, in order to move on from older Colonial-era concepts, Ministry of Defence has decided to give up responsibility to consider to excise civil areas of certain Cantonments and merge them with neighbouring State municipalities. As of then, there were 58 Cantonments of which 10 were to be handed over in the first phase. The administration of civil areas was to be handed over from Cantonment Boards to the neighbouring Municipalities while the military region was to remain with the Armed Forces. On 27 April 2024, KhasYol had become the first cantonment board to be "de-notified".

On 2 September 2024, it was reported that paperwork are being completed to handover civilian areas of Cantonments from the Indian Army. The Cantonments include Dehradun, Deolali, Nasirabad, Babina, Ajmer, Ramgarh, Mathura, Shahjahanpur, Clement Town and Fatehgarh. The report sain, "Indian Army's Central Command, South Western Command and Southern Command are in the process of completing the hand over exercise in coordination with Uttarakhand, Maharashtra, Rajasthan, Jharkhand and Uttar Pradesh governments."

Major cantonments and garrisons include the following:

==== Notified cantonments ====
1. Central Command
  1. Agra Cantonment, Uttar Pradesh
  2. Almora Cantonment, Uttarakhand
  3. Ayodhya Cantonment, Uttar Pradesh
  4. Bareilly Cantonment, Uttar Pradesh
  5. Chakrata Cantonment, Uttarakhand
  6. Clement Town Cantonment, Uttarakhand (To be denotified)
  7. Danapur Cantonment, Bihar
  8. Dehradun Cantonment, Uttarakhand (To be denotified)
  9. Fatehgarh Cantonment, Uttar Pradesh (To be denotified)
  10. Gopalpur Cantonment, Odisha
  11. Jabalpur Cantonment, Madhya Pradesh
  12. Kanpur Cantonment, Uttar Pradesh
  13. Landour Cantonment, Uttarakhand
  14. Lansdowne Cantonment, Uttarakhand
  15. Lucknow Cantonment, Uttar Pradesh
  16. Mathura Cantonment, Uttar Pradesh (To be denotified)
  17. Meerut Cantonment, Uttar Pradesh
  18. Mhow Cantonment, Madhya Pradesh
  19. Nainital Cantonment, Uttarakhand
  20. Pachmarhi Cantonment, Madhya Pradesh
  21. Prayagraj Cantonment, Uttar Pradesh
  22. Ramgarh Cantonment, Jharkhand (To be denotified)
  23. Ranikhet Cantonment, Uttarakhand
  24. Roorkee Cantonment, Uttarakhand
  25. Shahajahanpur Cantonment, Uttar Pradesh (To be denotified)
  26. Varanasi Cantonment, Uttar Pradesh
2. Southern Command
  1. Ahmedabad Cantonment, Gujarat
  2. Ahmednagar Cantonment, Maharashtra
  3. Ajmer Cantonment, Rajasthan (To be denotified)
  4. Aurangabad Cantonment, Maharashtra
  5. Babina Cantonment, Jhansi, Uttar Pradesh (To be denotified)
  6. Belgaum Cantonment, Karnataka
  7. Bellary Cantonment, Karnataka (Inactive, De-notified)
  8. Dehu Road Cantonment, Maharashtra
  9. Deolali Cantonment, Maharashtra (To be denotified)
  10. Jhansi Cantonment, Uttar Pradesh
  11. Kamptee Cantonment, Maharashtra
  12. Kannur Cantonment, Kerala
  13. Kirkee Cantonment, Maharashtra
  14. Morar Cantonment, Gwalior, Madhya Pradesh
  15. Nasirabad Cantonment, Rajasthan (To be denotified)
  16. Pune Cantonment, Maharashtra
  17. Sagar Cantonment, Madhya Pradesh
  18. Secunderabad Cantonment, Telangana
  19. St. Thomas Mount Cantonment, Chennai, Tamil Nadu
  20. Wellington Cantonment, Tamil Nadu
3. Western Command
  1. Ambala Cantonment, Haryana
  2. Amritsar Cantonment, Punjab
  3. Bakloh Cantonment, Chamba District, Himachal Pradesh
  4. Dagshai Cantonment, Himachal Pradesh
  5. Dalhousie Cantonment, Himachal Pradesh
  6. Delhi Cantonment, Delhi
  7. Ferozepur Cantonment, Punjab
  8. Jalandhar Cantonment, Punjab
  9. Jammu Cantonment, Jammu and Kashmir
  10. Jutogh Cantonment, Shimla, Himachal Pradesh
  11. Kasauli Cantonment, Himachal Pradesh
  12. Subathu Cantonment, Shimla Hills, Himachal Pradesh
  13. KhasYol Cantonment, Dharamshala, Himachal Pradesh (de-notified on 2023)
4. Eastern Command
  1. Barrackpore, West Bengal
  2. Dum Dum Cantonment, West Bengal (Inactive, De-notified)
  3. Jalapahar, Darjeeling, West Bengal
  4. Lebong, Darjeeling, West Bengal
  5. Shillong Cantonment, Meghalaya
5. Northern Command
  1. Badamibagh Cantonment, Jammu and Kashmir

==== Unlisted military cantonments ====
1. Abohar Cantonment (Abohar, Punjab)
2. Akhnoor Cantonment (Akhnoor, Jammu and Kashmir)
3. Baddowal Cantonment (Ludhiana, Punjab)
4. Bangalore Cantonment (Bangalore, Karnataka)
5. Bikaner Cantonment (Bikaner, Rajasthan)
1. Bharatpur Cantonment (Rajasthan)
2. Bhatinda Cantonment (Bhatinda, Punjab)
3. Binnaguri Cantonment (West Bengal)
4. Bhuj Cantonment (Bhuj, Gujarat)
5. Bhopal Cantonment (Madhya Pradesh)
6. Bhubaneswar cantonment (Bhubaneswar, Odisha)
7. Beas Military Station (Punjab)
8. Chandimandir Cantonment (Chandigarh)
9. Dipatoli Cantonment (Ranchi, Jharkhand)
10. Faridkot Cantonment (Faridkot, Punjab)
11. Fazilka Cantonment (Fazilka, Punjab)
12. Gandhinagar Cantonment (Gandhinagar, Gujarat)
13. Gopalpur Cantonment (Brahmapur, Orissa)
14. Hisar Cantonment (Hisar, Haryana)
15. Itarana Cantonment (Alwar, Rajasthan)
16. Jaipur Cantonment (Jaipur, Rajasthan)
17. Jaisalmer Cantonment (Jaisalmer, Rajasthan)
18. Jodhpur Cantonment (Rajasthan)
19. Joshimath Cantonment (Joshimath, Uttarakhand)
20. Kapurthala Cantonment (Kapurthala, Punjab)
21. Khasa Cantonment (Amritsar, Punjab)
22. Kollam Cantonment (Kollam, India)
23. Ludhiana Cantonment (Punjab)
24. Mamun Cantonment (Pathankot, Punjab)
25. Missamari Cantonment (Missamari, Assam)
26. Nagrota Cantonment (Nagrota, Jammu & Kashmir)
27. Narengi Cantonment (Guwahati, Assam)
28. Pathankot Cantonment (Pathankot, Punjab)
29. Patiala Cantonment (Punjab)
30. Pithoragarh Cantonment (Pithoragarh, Uttarakhand)
31. Shahjahanpur Cantonment (Shahjahanpur, Uttar Pradesh)
32. Solmara Cantonment (Tezpur, Assam)
33. Sri Ganganagar Cantonment (Sri Ganganagar, Rajasthan)
34. Suratgarh Cantonment (Suratgarh, Rajasthan)
35. Thiruvananthapuram Cantonment (Thiruvananthapuram, Kerala)
36. Tibri Cantonment (Gurdaspur, Punjab)
37. Udhampur Cantonment (Udhampur, Jammu & Kashmir)
38. Udaipur Cantonment (Rajasthan)
39. Vadodra Cantonment (Vadodra, Gujarat)
40. Varanasi Cantonment, Uttar Pradesh, Central Command
41. Siliguri Cantonment(West Bengal)
42. Shillong Cantonment(Meghalaya)

=== Ghana ===
- Cantonments, Accra

=== Nigeria ===
Cantonments in Nigeria refer to permanent military installations which house active personnel and their families. Cantonments in Nigeria include:

- Airforce Cantonment, Ikeja, Lagos
- Armed forces resettlement centre, Oshodi, Lagos
- Army Ordnance Cantonment, (also known as Abalti Barracks), Yaba, Lagos
- Arn Cantonment, Yaba, Lagos
- Badagry Cantonment, Badagry, Lagos
- Dodan Cantonment, Ikoyi, Lagos
- Ikeja Cantonment, Ikeja, Lagos
- Marda Cantonment, Yaba, Lagos
- Navy Town, Ojo, Lagos
- Ojo Cantonment (also known as Palm Barracks), Ojo, Lagos,
- Bonny Camp, Victoria Island
- Jaji military cantonment, kaduna,
- Dalet cantonment, kaduna,
- Mogadishu cantonment,
- Abiyssinia cantonment,
- .Burma cantonment,
- Adshanti cantonment,
- Nigerian Defence Academy, Afaka, Kaduna

=== Pakistan ===
- Abbottabad Cantonment
- Attock Cantonment
- Allama Iqbal Cantonment
- Bannu Cantonment
- Bhawalpur Cantonment
- Chaklala Cantonment
- Clifton Cantonment, Karachi
- Dera Ismail Khan Cantonment
- Faisal Cantonment, Karachi
- Faisalabad Cantonment
- Gujranwala Cantonment
- Hyderabad Cantonment
- Jhelum Cantonment
- Kamra Cantonment
- Karachi Cantonment
- Kharian Cantonment
- Khuzdar Cantonment
- Korangi Creek Cantonment, Karachi
- Lahore Cantonment
- Walton Cantonment: Created out of the southern parts of the original Lahore Cantt., Walton, Lahore
- Loralai Cantonment
- Malir Cantonment, Karachi
- Mangla Cantonment
- Manora Cantonment, Karachi
- Mardan Cantonment
- Multan Cantonment
- Murree Cantonment
- Nowshera Cantonment
- Okara Cantonment
- Ormara Cantonment
- Pano Aqil Cantonment
- Peshawar Cantonment
- Quetta Cantonment
- Rawalpindi Cantonment
- Sanjwal Cantonment
- Sargodha Cantonment
- Shorkot Cantonment (PAF Rafiqui)
- Sialkot Cantonment
- Taxila Cantonment
- Wah Cantonment
- Zhob Cantonment

=== Singapore ===
In Singapore, the term is used to denote a police cantonment.

=== South Africa ===
- Thaba Tshwane

=== Sri Lanka ===
- Panagoda Cantonment

=== United States ===
The United States military commonly uses the term "cantonment" to describe the permanent facilities at U.S. Army training bases as opposed to the field training areas. Cantonment areas often include housing (such as barracks and maid-service quarters), dining facilities, training classrooms, exchanges, and paved air fields.

== See also ==
- Kaserne
- Cantonment, Florida
