= Cantonment Public School and College =

Cantonment Public School and College are educational institutions run by Bangladesh Army.

Cantonment Public School may also refer to:

- Bogura Cantonment Public School and College, an educational institution in Bogura.
- Jalalabad Cantonment Public School and College, an educational institution in Sylhet.
- Savar Cantonment Public School and College, an educational institution in Savar.
- Sylhet Cantonment Public School and College, an educational institution in Sylhet.
