= St. Jude High School =

St. Jude High School may refer to:

- St Jude High School (Pune), school in Pune, Maharashtra, India
- St. Jude Educational Institute, school in Montgomery, Alabama, United States
