= Ballari Cantonment railway station =

Railway station in Karnataka, India

Ballari Cantonment Bellary Contonment

General information
- Other names: Ballari Cantt. / Bellary Cantt.
- Location: Bellary Cantonment, Ballari, Karnataka; India
- Coordinates: 15.1506°N 76.8950°E
- Elevation: 469 metres (1,539 ft)
- System: Indian Railways station
- Owner: Indian Railways
- Operator: South Western Railway
- Line: Guntakal–Vasco da Gama section
- Platforms: 2
- Tracks: 2
- Connections: Auto stand

Construction
- Structure type: Standard (on-ground station)
- Parking: No
- Cycle facilities: Yes

Other information
- Status: Functioning
- Station code: BYC
- Zone(s): South Western Railway
- Division(s): Hubli
Location

Ballari Cantonment railway station (station code: BYC) is a second railway station in Ballari, Karnataka for local passenger trains only. It serves Ballari city. The station consists of two platforms, neither well sheltered. It lacks many facilities including water and sanitation. it is situated in the Bellary cantonment.
