= Lalmonirhat Cantonment =

Bangladeshi military cantonment

- লালমনিরহাট সেনানিবাস
- Country: Bangladesh
- Branch: Bangladesh Army

Lalmonirhat Cantonment (Note: Bengali: লালমনিরহাট সেনানিবাস, romanized: Lālamanirahāṭa sēnānibāsa) is an army cantonment located in Lalmonirhat, Rangpur, Bangladesh.

== Education ==
- Lalmonirhat Cantonment Public School and College

== Installations ==
- Army Aviation School, Lalmonirhat Cantonment

== See also ==
- Rangpur Cantonment
- Postogola Cantonment
- Sylhet Cantonment
