= Kamra Cantonment =

Coordinates: 33.8480°N 72.4227°E

Kamra Cantonment is a cantonment adjacent to the Kamra Airbase of Pakistan Air Force in Attock District, Punjab province, Pakistan.
