= Sylhet Cantonment Public School and College =

Educational institution in Bangladesh

- সিলেট ক্যান্টনমেন্ট পাবলিক স্কুল অ্যান্ড কলেজ
- Sylhet Cantonment, Sylhet, Bangladesh

Information
- Other name: Cantonment Public School and College, Sylhet
- Motto: Knowledge is Light
- Chairman of Institution: Brigadier General Muhammad Ali Haider Siddiqui
- Principal of Institution: Lt Col. Md Emran Hossain
- Gender: Male; Female
- Website: sylhetcpsc.edu.bd

Sylhet Cantonment Public School and College (Bengali: সিলেট ক্যান্টনমেন্ট পাবলিক স্কুল অ্যান্ড কলেজ, romanized: Silēṭa kyānṭanamēnṭa pābalika skula ayānḍa kalēja) is an educational institution located in Sylhet Cantonment, Sylhet, Bangladesh. It is operated by the Bangladesh Army. The institution was established in 2019.

== History ==
Sylhet Cantonment Public School and College was established in January 2019.

== Administration ==
As of 2025, the chairman is Brigadier Gen. Muhammad Ali Haider Siddiqui and, the principal of the institution is Lt Col. Md Emran Hossain.

== Identification ==
Sylhet Cantonment Public School and College's Educational Institute Identification Number is 138576.

== See also ==
- List of schools in Bangladesh
- List of formations of the Bangladesh Army
- Education in Bangladesh
- High schools in Bangladesh
- Ministry of Education (Bangladesh)
- Universities in Bangladesh
- Jalalabad Cantonment Public School and College
- Nirjhor Cantonment Public School and College
