= Indian Defence Estates Service =

Civil Service in the Government of India

Service Overview
Abbreviation	IDES
Formerly known as	Defence Lands and Cantonment Service (1983–1985); Military Lands and Cantonment Service (1926–1983)
Formed	1926 (As Military Lands and Cantonment Service)
Country	India
Staff College	National Institute of Defence Estates Management, New Delhi
Cadre Controlling Authority	Ministry of Defence
Legal personality	Governmental: Government service
Duties	Cantonment Administration; Defence Land Management; Managing court cases related to defence land
Cadre Strength	189 members (2016)
Selection	Union Public Service Commission's (UPSC) Civil Services Examination

Service Chief
Directorate General of Defence Estates	Ms. Shobha Gupta, IDES

Head of the Civil Services
Cabinet Secretary	T. V. Somanathan, IAS

The Indian Defence Estates Service (abbreviated as IDES) (Hindi: भारतीय रक्षा सम्पदा सेवा) is a Civil Service in the Government of India. Its Cadre Controlling Authority (CCA) is the Ministry of Defence. Civil Services Examination conducted every year by Union Public Service Commission provides a gateway for entry into this service. The Service traces its origin to 16 December 1926 and has been constantly evolving since then. The service was initially known as the Military Lands and Cantonment Service (1926–1983), and then Defence Lands and Cantonment Service (1983–1985). In 1985, it was renamed as the Indian Defence Estates Service. The service is governed by the Indian Defence Estates Service (Group A) Rules, 2013, where 75% intake is by direct recruitment and 25% by promotion.

== Organisation structure ==
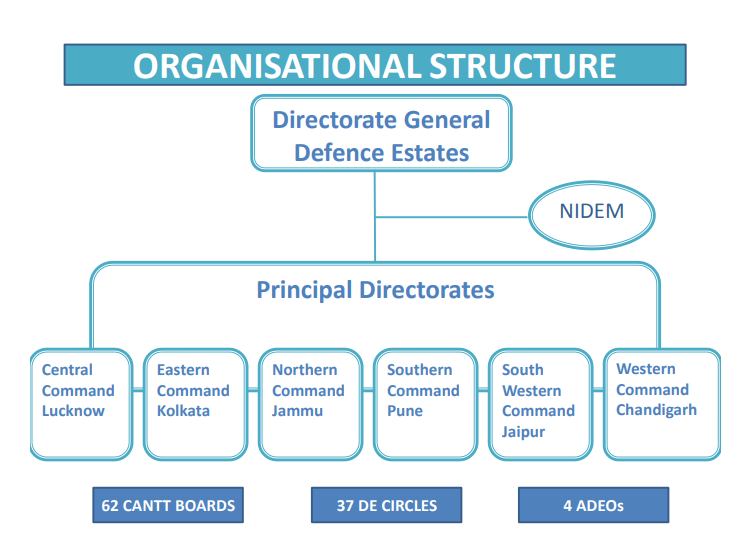
Diagram of IDES Organizational structure

The officers manning the Directorate General are members of the IDES. The Director General of Defence Estates is the highest-ranking officer of the service, who also heads the Directorate General, located at Raksha Sampada Bhawan in Delhi Cantonment, New Delhi. Under DGDE are 5 officers, 4 of which are Additional Director General (ADG) of Defence Estates and one Senior Additional Director General (SADG) of Defence Estates. The ADGs are in-charge of their respective divisions i.e. Cantonments & Co-ord., Acquisition and Hiring, Administration, and Lands. All the ADGs belong to Senior Administrative Grade (SAG) while the SADG belongs to Higher Administrative Grade (HAG). National Institute of Defence Estates Management (NIDEM) is an autonomous body directly reporting to DGDE. It is headed by a Director who also belongs to SAG. The Ministry of Defence is provided advice on matters related to Defence Lands and Cantonments by DGDE. The Cantonments Act, 2006, its rules and regulations etc. are implemented under supervision of DGDE. The land and building requirement of Ministry of Defence is fulfilled by the Directorate General through acquisitions, requisition or hiring.

The next level in organisation structure includes the 6 Directorates as regional headquarters. They supervise the field offices coming under their jurisdiction. It has been proposed to merge DGDE with the Indian Army. The 6 Directorates, are co-located with the 6 Indian Army Commands i.e. Northern Command at Jammu, Central Command at Lucknow, Western Command at Chandigarh, Eastern Command at Kolkata, and the Southwestern Command established in 2006 at Jaipur. Principal Directors (PDs) head the respective Commands. PDsDE are Higher Administrative Grade (HAG) officers.

In the field, Chief Executive Officers (CEOs) head 62 Cantonment Boards, and Defence Estates Officers (DEOs) head 37 Defence Estates Circles and 4 Assistant Defence Estates Offices. The Chief Executive Officer (CEO) is overall incharge of all the matters related to administration of Cantonments as provided by Cantonments Act, 2006. The Defence Estates Officers (DEOs) are responsible for management of Defence Lands. CEOs are both Group A and Group B(Gazetted) officers whereas DEOs are Group A IDES officers.

== Cantonment Monetisation ==
The lands situated in the cantonments are to be monetised as per the Cantonments Act 2020, a part of National Land Monetisation scheme, under the National Monetisation Pipeline (NMP), which will use the proceeds to fund the modernisation of the Indian Armed Forces, to procure critical arms and ammunition, as a large amount of funds is used to maintain these cantonments.

== Recruitment ==
Recruitment to the Indian Defence Estates Service is done through an extremely competitive examination called the "Civil Services Examination", organised by the Union Public Service Commission (UPSC). The number of vacancies vary every year. Every year Department of Personnel and Training, Government of India, elucidates the number of vacancies after consulting the cadre controlling authority i.e. Ministry of Defence.

== NIDEM ==
National Institute of Defence Estates Management is located in New Delhi, on Ulan Batar Road near Domestic Airport in Delhi Cantonment. It is an apex institution providing training to future IDES officers. It Also, it imparts training to lower staff through various courses spanning through entire year. NIDEM is headed by a Director, who is an SAG level officer. Presently the post is held by Mr. Rajendra Pawar. The Director of NIDEM is assisted in his functioning by a Joint Director, who is an JAG level officer. NIDEM is an autonomous body directly reporting to the Director General of Defence Estates.

== Allocation and placement ==
After being selected in the UPSC exam, candidates undergo training at National Institute of Defence Estates Management at New Delhi.The following table is salary structure of the Group A Officers.

Ranks, designations, and positions held by Indian Defence Estates Service (IDES) officers in their career
Grade / Scale (Level on Pay Matrix)	Posting in Directorate / DGDE	Position in Government of India	Position in Order of precedence in India	Pay Scale (Basic Pay)
Apex Scale (Pay Level 17)	Director General, Defence Estates (DGDE)	Secretary	23	₹225,000 (US$2,300)
Higher Administrative Grade + (Pay Level 16)	Senior Additional Director General	Additional Secretary	25	₹205,400 (US$2,100)—₹224,400 (US$2,300)
Higher Administrative Grade (Pay Level 15)	Principal Director / Additional Director General	Additional Secretary	25	₹182,200 (US$1,900)—₹224,100 (US$2,300)
Senior Administrative Grade (Pay Level 14)	Director / Deputy Director General	Joint Secretary	26	₹144,200 (US$1,500)—₹218,200 (US$2,300)
Selection Grade (Pay Level 13)	Joint Director (Selection Grade)	Director		₹123,100 (US$1,300)—₹215,900 (US$2,200)
Junior Administrative Grade (Pay Level 12)	Joint Director / Deputy Director General	Deputy Secretary		₹78,800 (US$820)—₹209,200 (US$2,200)
Senior Time Scale (Pay Level 11)	Deputy Director / Assistant Director General	Under Secretary		₹67,700 (US$700)—₹208,700 (US$2,200)
Junior Time Scale (Pay Level 10)	Assistant Director / Deputy Assistant Director General Entry-level (Probationer)	Assistant Secretary		₹56,100 (US$580)—₹177,500 (US$1,800)

== Appointment of IDES officers in other Organisations/Bodies ==
Currently officers are posted in Ministry of New and Renewable Energy, Cabinet Secretariat of India, Ministry of Home Affairs (India) etc.

== AU&RC ==
Archival Unit and Resource Centre is the latest addition to the IT based facilities used by DGDE. It is based on cutting edge technology, meant to aid the process of record retrieval and preservation, digitisation of records, publishing survey reports etc. Old records pertaining to Cantonment Board meeting, Survey of Defence lands etc. are sent to AU&RC for being preserved. It is a 5-stage process that helps in keeping records even more than 150 years old in good condition. Currently, AU&RC is functioning at an efficiency of 200 pages a day. The entire staff consists of re-employed persons. AU&RC is directly supervised by DGDE.

== See also ==
- Indian Armed Forces
- Ministry of Defence
- Defence industry of India
- Directorate General Defence Estates
- Directorate of Ordnance (Coordination & Services)
