= Sylhet Cantonment =

Cantonment of the Bangladesh Army

- সিলেট সেনানিবাস
- Branch: Bangladesh Army

Sylhet Cantonment (Note: Bengali: সিলেট সেনানিবাস) is a cantonment of the Bangladesh army located in Sylhet.

== Installations ==
- Ordnance Depot, Sylhet
- 50th Field Regiment Artillery
- 75th Field Ambulance
- 40th Bangladesh Infantry Regiment
- 155th Field Workshops
- 125th Brigade Signals
- 17th Independent Amenities Platoon (IAP)

== Education ==
- Sylhet Cantonment Public School and College

== See also ==
- List of formations of the Bangladesh Army
- Postogola Cantonment
