= Jalalabad Cantonment Public School and College =

Educational Institution in Sylhet, Bangladesh

Jalalabad Cantonment Public School & College
- জালালাবাদ ক্যান্টনমেন্ট পাবলিক স্কুল অ্যান্ড কলেজ
- Jalalabad Cantonment; Sylhet, Sylhet District, 3100; Bangladesh

Information
- Type: School & College
- Motto: জ্ঞানে আলোকিত (Enlightened with knowledge)
- Established: 4 July 1999
- Status: Active
- School board: Board of Intermediate and Secondary Education, Sylhet
- Language: Bangla and English
- Area: 10.5 acres
- Campus type: Urban
- Affiliation: Army Institute of Business Administration
- Website: jcpscsylhet.edu.bd
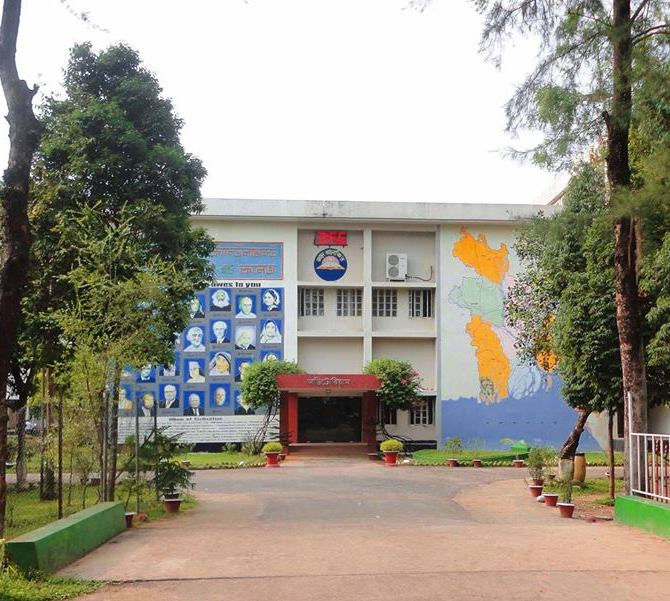
- Auditorium

Jalalabad Cantonment Public School and College is an educational institution in Sylhet, Bangladesh.

== History ==
The college was named the 3rd best college among the cantonment public schools and colleges run by the Bangladesh Army in 2023 and 2nd best school in the country during National Education Week 2026.

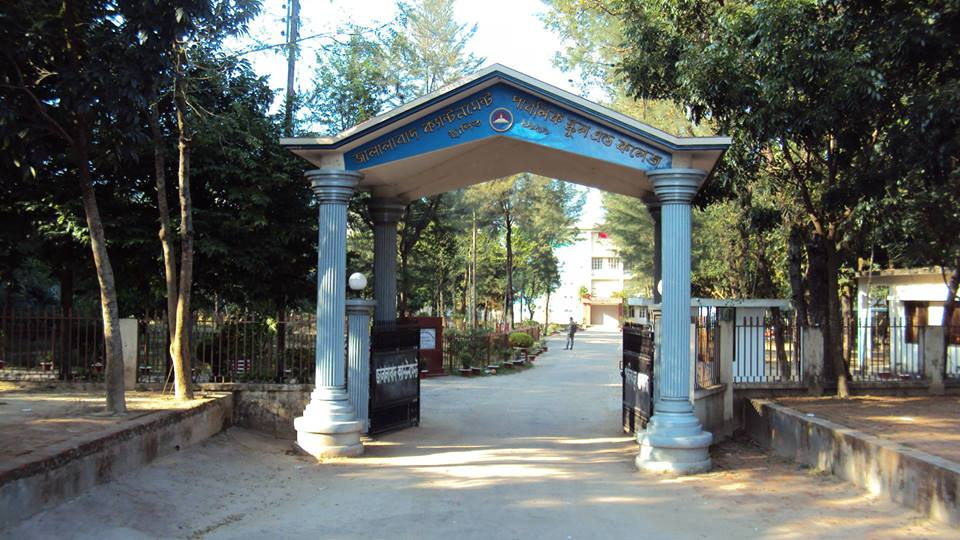
Gate Jalalabad Cantonment Public School and College

== Facilities ==
The institution is located on a campus of approximately 10.5 acres. Its facilities include an auditorium with a seating capacity of about 650

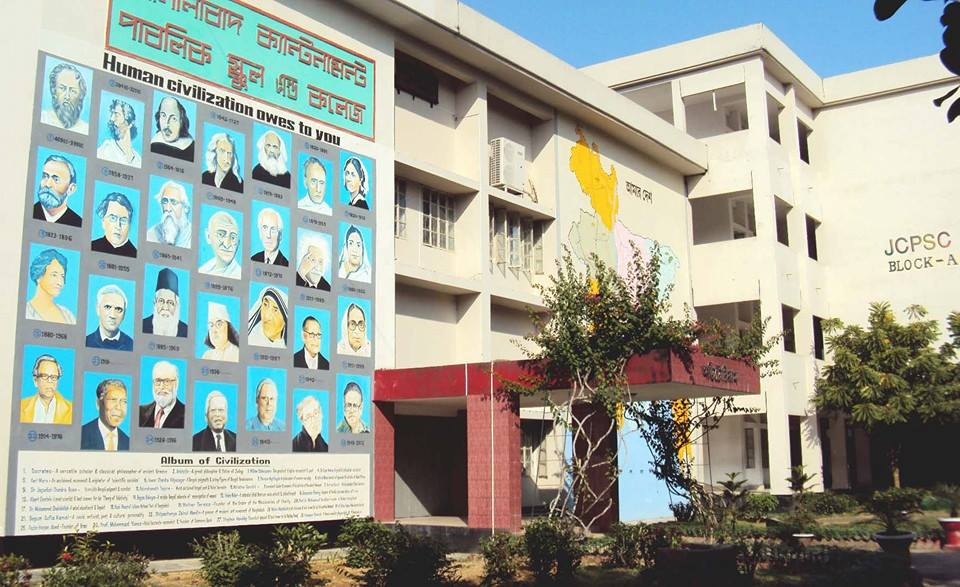
Auditorium and School Building

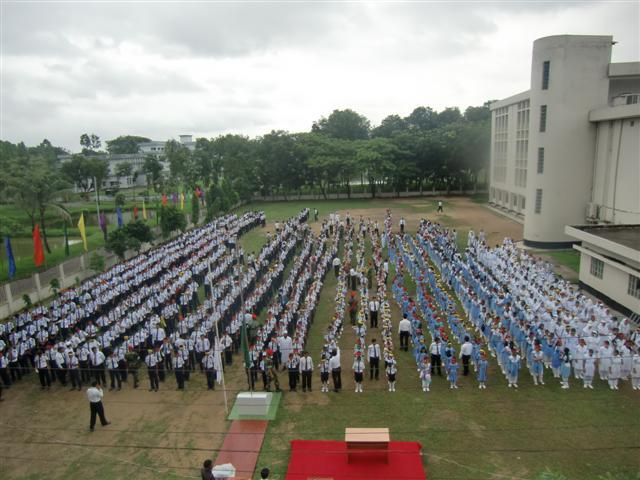
Assembly JCPSC

== Academics ==
Departments

1. Humanities
2. Science
3. Commerce

== Gallery ==
Celebrating 25th anniversary in 12 December 2024:

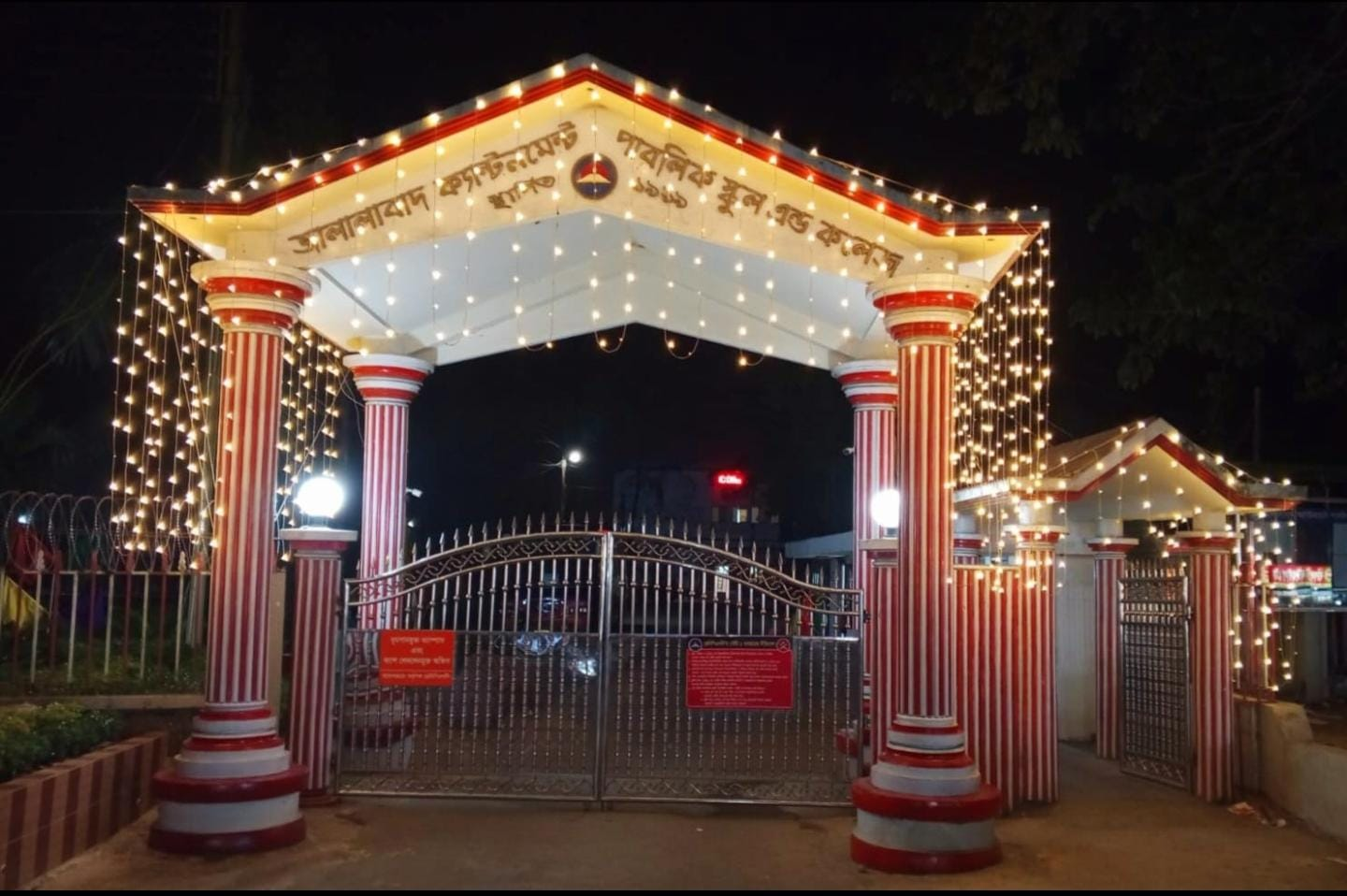

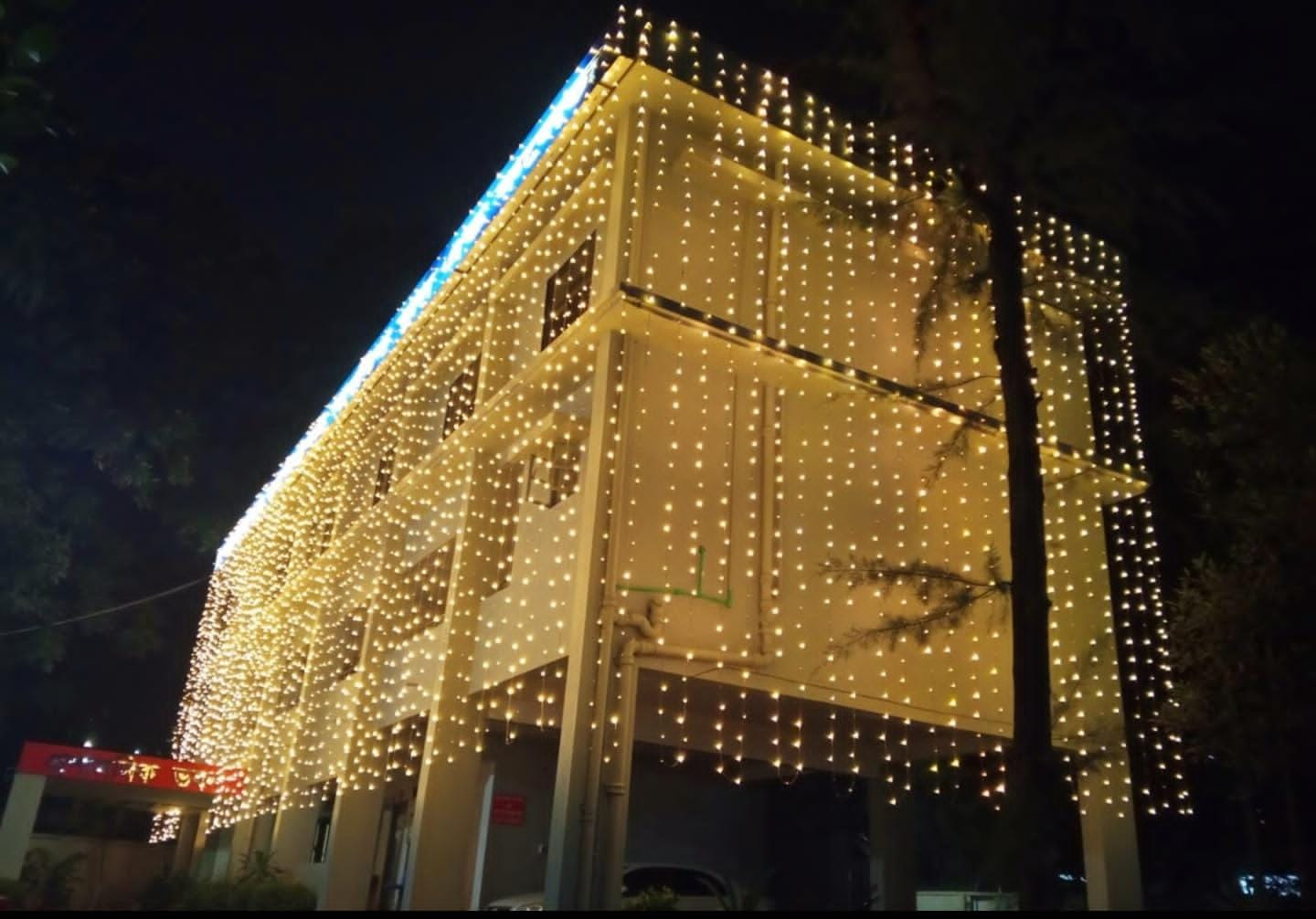

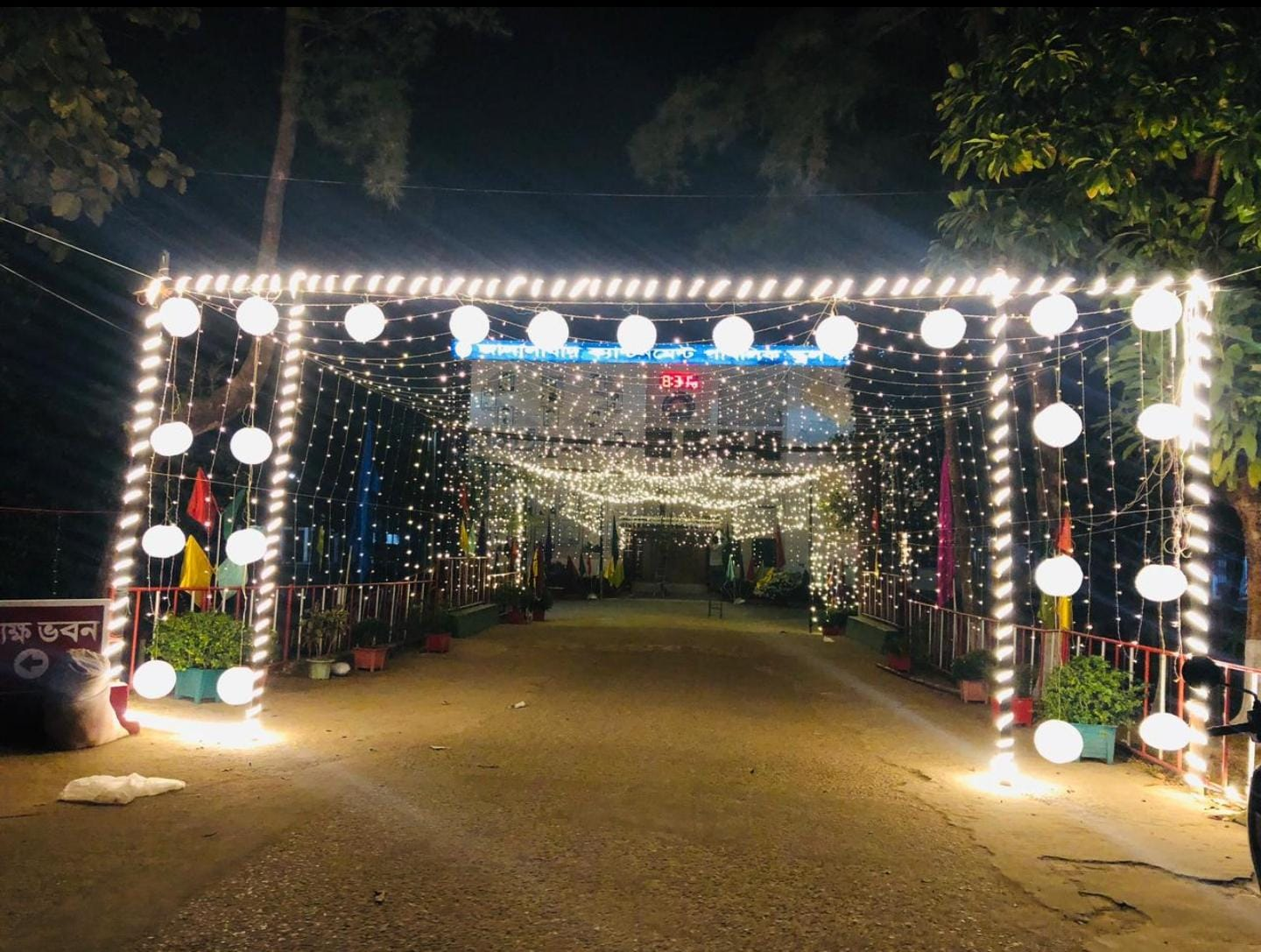

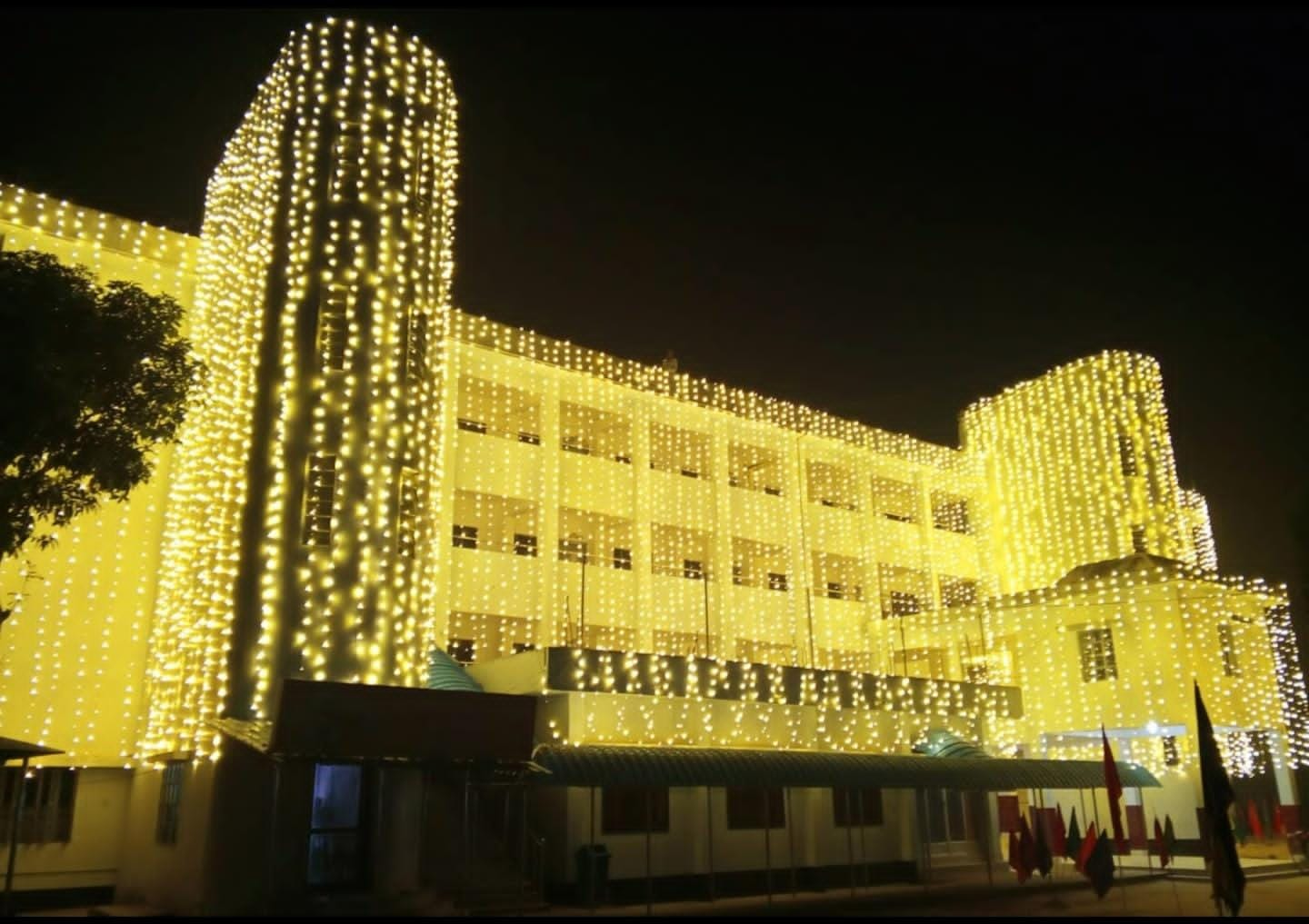

== See also ==
- Adamjee Cantonment Public School & College
- Rangpur Cantonment Public College
- Chittagong Public School & College
- Dawood Public School
