= Dehu Road =

Dehu Road Cantt
- Neighbourhood
- Location in Maharashtra, India
- Coordinates: 18.6838°N 73.7318°E
- Country: India
- State: Maharashtra
- City: Pune

Population (2011)
  - Total: 48,961

Languages
  - Official: Marathi, Hindi & English
- Time zone: UTC+5:30 (IST)
- PIN: 412101
- Vehicle registration: MH 14, MH 12

Dehu Road Cantt, is a military cantonment in the city of Pune, India, which was established in October 1958. The Dehu Ordnance Depot and Dehu Ammunition Depot was set up in the 1940s.

The Dehu Road Cantonment Board was established in 1958 and is an autonomous body controlled by the Ministry of Defence. It is divided into seven wards in seven villages which include civil and military population. At the 2011 census, the population of Dehuroad Cantonment was 48,961 including the military population.

== Geography ==
It is located in the hills of the Sahyadris, 25 kilometres (16 mi) west of Pune city. The holy river Indrayani passes through its limits.

Dehu Road lies 9 km northwest of Chinchwad and 27 km northwest of Pune Central along the NH4 Old Pune Mumbai Express Highway that connects it to Pune Central via Chinchwad.

Dehu Road lies at an altitude of over 600 metres (2,000 ft), between two southeasterly flowing tributaries of the Bhima River, the Indrayani River to the north and the Pavana River to the south.

== Economy ==
As Dehu Road is a cantonment town, it hosts offices of Central Government departments, especially military and defence.

== Government ==
The Cantonment Board consists of 07 elected members elected by the general public by general election as per Cantonment Electoral Rules 2007 every five years. The officer commanding the station is the president of Dehuroad Cantonment board.

== Transport ==
Dehu Road can be reached from Pune by road or suburban rail.

PMPML Buses are also well connected to Dehu Road from Nigdi and Pune City

=== Rail station ===
The station has 4 platforms and 6 lines with a connecting footbridge. The Mumbai CST - Kolhapur Sahyadri Express, Mumbai CST - Bijapur Passenger, Mumbai CST - Pandharpur Passenger, Mumbai CST - Shirdi Passenger and Pune Junction - Karjat Shuttle halt there. This station is a halt for all the Suburban trains of Pune.

== Demographics ==
The population includes people from various states of India (mostly South Indian States). At the 2011 Census, Dehu Road had a population of 48,961. Males constituted 53% of the population and females 47%. Dehu Road had an average literacy rate of 90.96%, higher than the national average of 74.04: male literacy was 94.80% and female literacy was 86.63%, and 11.64% of the population was under 6 years of age.

== Education ==
- St. Jude High School
- Kendriya Vidyalaya

== Sports ==
A new international-standard cricket stadium called Maharashtra Cricket Association Stadium at Dehu Road in Gahunje has hosted IPL matches.
