= Sagar Cantonment =

- Cantonment town
- Location in Madhya Pradesh, India Sagar Cantonment (India)
- Coordinates: 23°51′17″N 78°44′23″E
- Country: India
- State: Madhya Pradesh
- District: Sagar

Population (2001)
  - Total: 35,872

Languages
  - Official: Hindi
- Time zone: UTC+5:30 (IST)
- ISO 3166 code: IN-MP
- Vehicle registration: MP-15

Sagar Cantonment is a cantonment town in Sagar district in the Indian state of Madhya Pradesh.

== Demographics ==
As of 2001 India census, Sagar Cantonment had a population of 35,872. Males constitute 52% of the population and females 48%. Sagar Cantonment has an average literacy rate of 72%, higher than the national average of 59.5%: male literacy is 77%, and female literacy is 66%. In Sagar Cantonment, 15% of the population is under 6 years of age.
