= Jalandhar Cantonment =

- Town
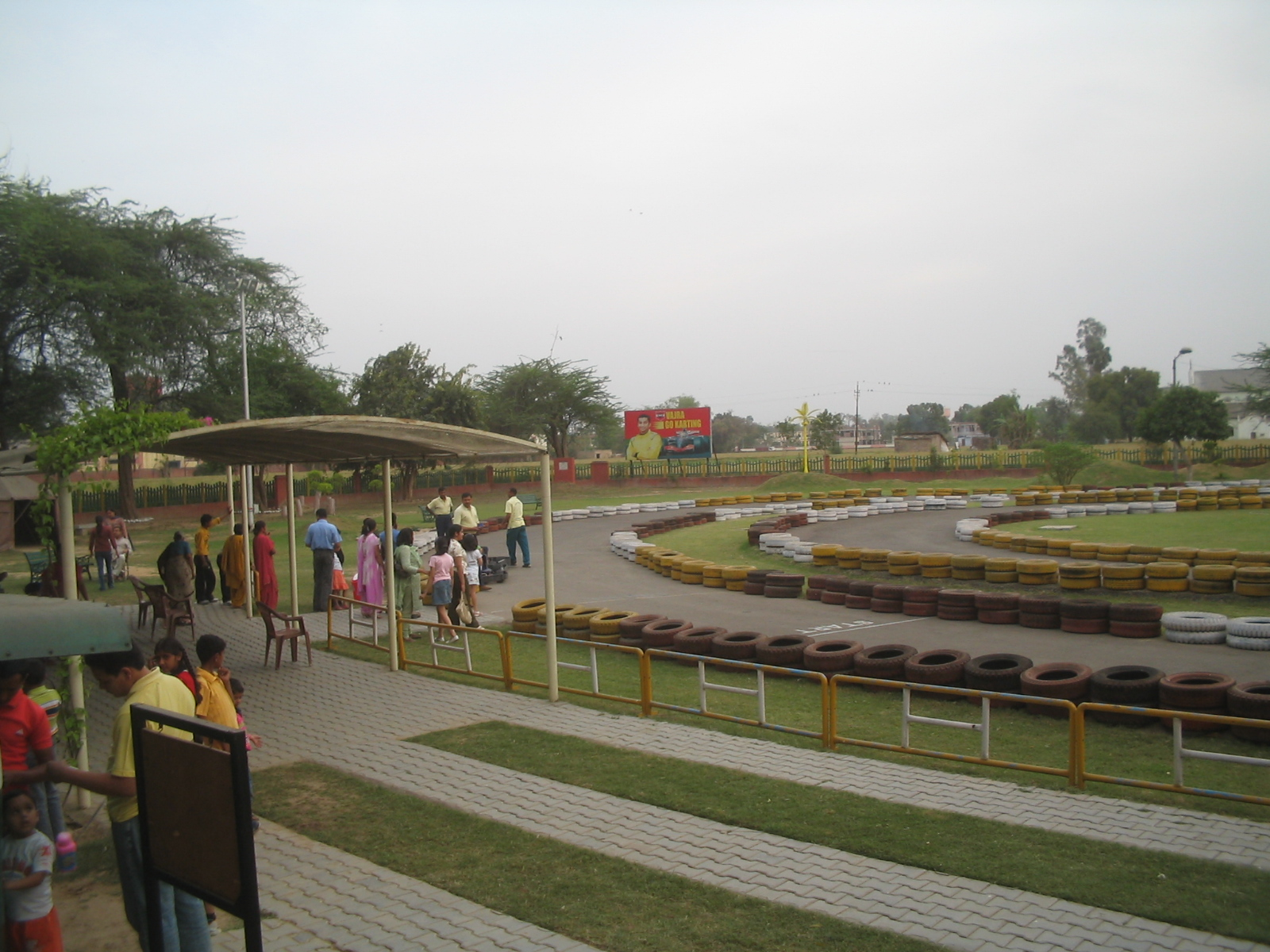
- Vajra Go Karting in Jalandhar Cantonment

- Location in Punjab, India
- Coordinates: 31.286°N 75.615°E
- Country: India
- State: Punjab
- District: Jalandhar
- Established: 1848

Government
  - Body: Jalandhar Cantonment Board
  - President

Population (2011)
  - Total: 47,845

Languages
  - Official: Punjabi
- Time zone: UTC+5:30 (IST)
- PIN: 144005
- Website: jalandhar.cantt.gov.in

Jalandhar Cantonment (typically abbreviated and referred to as Jalandhar Cantt) is a cantonment town in Jalandhar District in the Indian state of Punjab. It is situated beside the Grand Trunk Road at a distance of 89 km from Amritsar and 371 km from Delhi. It covers an area of 15.2 km^{2} (5.87 square miles) It is located on the Amritsar-Delhi Broad Gauge Main Line. A Class-I airfield at Adampur is situated at a distance of 19 km. The airfield is linked with Jalandhar Cantonment by rail and road.

== History ==
It is one of the oldest cantonments in India, established in 1848 after the first Anglo-Sikh War, when the British settled in Northern India. The original scope of this cantonment was limited to troops to quell disturbances from adjoining States for the maintenance of peace and order.

In 1920 the cantonment was the scene of mutiny by Irish soldiers, who were protesting against martial law in Ireland by refusing to obey orders. They took down the Union Flag and replaced it with the flag of the Irish Republic, proclaimed at the time in Dublin (See The Connaught Rangers#Mutiny in India, 1920).

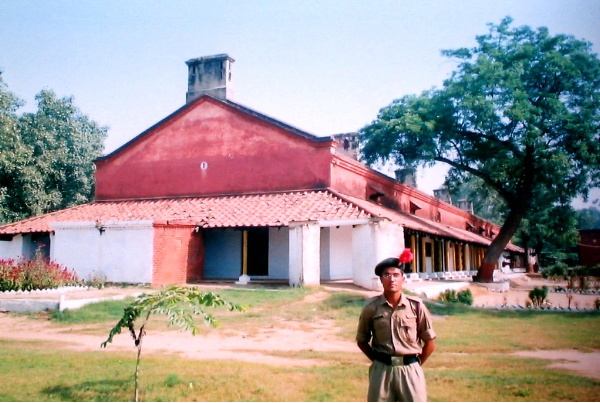
The cantonment is dotted with buildings dating back to the British era

== Units stationed ==
Military Hospital Jalandhar was established here to provide health care and education to troops of the Indian army and their families. It is the peacetime station and family station for the 163 Medium Artillery Regiment, 169 Field Artillery Regiment, 141 Air Defence (SAM) Regiment, 4th Battalion Rajputana Rifles, 4th Battalion of Bengal Sappers and 2nd Signals Battalion. The families of soldiers and officers of the above units live in the cantonment housing.

== Demographics ==
As of the 2011 Census of India, Jalandhar Cantonment had a population of 47,845. Males constitute 59% of the population and females 41%. Jalandhar Cantonment has an average literacy rate of 81%, higher than the national average of 75%: male literacy is 85%, and female literacy is 75%. In Jalandhar Cantonment, 10% of the population is under 6 years of age.
