= Firozpur Cantonment =

- Town
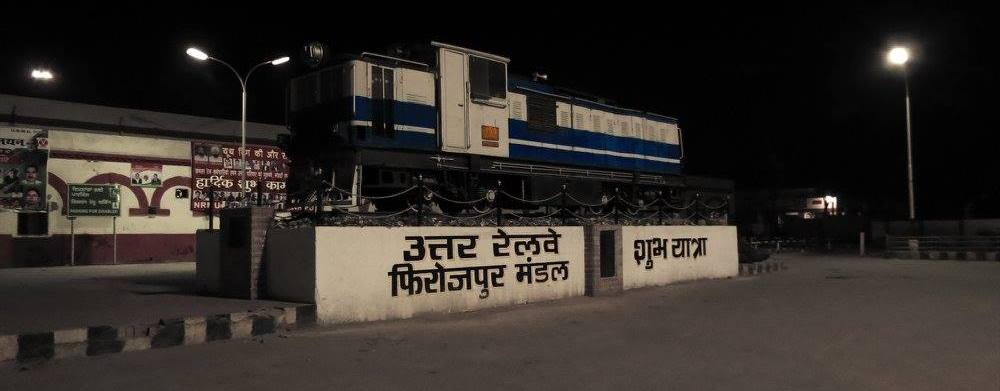
- Narrow gauge loco outside Ferozepur cantt Railway station

- Location in Punjab, India
- Coordinates: 30.94193°N 74.618343°E
- Country: India
- State: Punjab
- District: Ferozepur

Government
  - Deputy Commissioner: D.P.S. Kharbanda

Population (2001)
  - Total: 57,418

Languages
  - Official: Punjabi
  - Other: Hindi and English
- Time zone: UTC+5:30 (IST)
- PIN: 152001
- Website: http://www.cbfzr.org/

Ferozepur Cantonment, also known as Firojpur Cantonment and Firojepur Cantonment, is a cantonment town in Firozpur district in the state of Punjab, India. It is located to the south of the city of Firozpur.

The cantonment played a key role for the British Indian Army during First Anglo-Sikh War. Today, it serves as the headquarters of the 7th Infantry Division of the Indian Army

Firozpur district's key administrative offices and residences, including the district courts and the commissioner's office, are within the cantonment rather than the city.

The Mall Road is the main road of the Cantonment and runs through most of its length. All key offices and institutions as well as residences are located on, or in close proximity to, the Mall Road.

== Demographics ==
As of the 2001 Census of India, Firozpur Cantonment had a population of 57,418. Males constitute 60% of the population and females 40%. Firozpur Cantonment has an average literacy rate of 75%, higher than the national average of 74.04%; male literacy is 80%, and female literacy is 68%. In Firozpur Cantonment, 11% of the population is under 6 years of age.

== History ==
Firozpur Cantonment was established in the year 1839 when Captain H. M. Lawrence was posted as the Assistant Political Agent of the Northwest Frontier. It is situated 5 miles (8.0 km) east of the Sutlej River, and about 2 miles (3.2 km) south of Firozpur city. Firozpur city and Cantonment, being situated on the India–Pakistan border, have not witnessed much industrial or commercial development. Firozpur Cantonment is a Class I Cantonment. The Cantonment is connected to the city by Jhoke Road and to the Sutlej by the Grand Trunk Road.

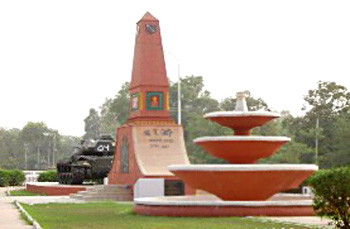
The Barki Memorial Ferozepur

Historically, it was an important Cantonment for the British. It was a vital base for their forces, particularly during the First Anglo-Sikh War (1845–1846), but also over the course of the Second Anglo-Sikh War (1848–1849). It continued as an important base for supporting forward positions in modern-day Pakistan. Until World War II, it was one of the largest Cantonments in this region. After the partition of India, the Cantonment's importance declined. There is an abandoned airstrip of British-era vintage in the Cantonment.

The Battle of Saragarhi Gurudwara is a part of the Cantonment's military history as the men in the battle were mostly from adjoining areas.

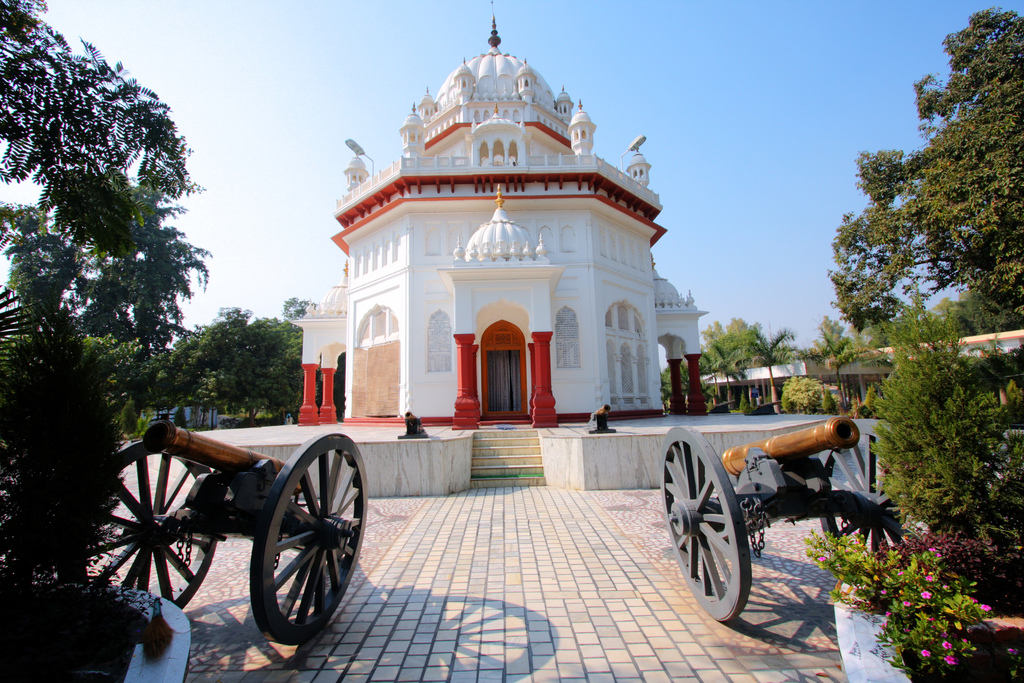
Saragarhi Memorial Ferozepur

== Profile ==
Firozpur Cantonment Board is constituted under the provisions of the Cantonments Act, 1924, which was enacted by the Central Government. This Board is under administrative control of Government of India through the Ministry of Defence. General Officer Commanding-in-Chief, (GOC-in-Chief) Western Command, Chandimandir, acts as the local government. The Officer Commanding the Station is the President of the Board. The administration of the Cantonment Board is supervised by the Defence Estates Organisation. An officer of the Indian Defence Estates Service (IDES) is posted as chief executive officer. Principal Director, Defence Estates, of the level of Additional Secretary at the centre, is posted in each Command, who is advisor to the GOC-in-Chief and is answerable to the Director General Defence Estates and, through him, to the Ministry of Defence.

The military units at the Cantonment come under the administrative and operational control of the 1st Armoured Division, Patiala. 2nd Battalion of Madras Sappers, 2 companies of 8th Battalion Bengal Sappers, 2nd and 9th Garhwal Rifles, 2/9 Gorkha Rifles, 1 Squadron 3rd Self-Propelled Anti-Aircraft Regiment, 3 Squadrons of 5th Battalion Scinde Horse, I Battery 34th Medium Artillery Regiment (equipped with 122 mm howitzer), D Signals Company of Divisional Signals Battalion and 23rd Field Mobile Ambulance Squadron of the Army Medical Corps are the units stationed at Firozpur Cantonment.

== Schools and colleges ==
- Dass & Brown World School
- B.M Jain Sr. Sec. School
- Doon Junior School
- Guru Nanak College
- D.C. Model Sr. Sec. School
- Army School
- Army Public School
- Grammar Model High School
- St.Joseph's Convent School
- Khalsa Girls Senior Secondary School
- Kendriya Vidyalaya No.1
- D.A.V College
- M.L.M Sr.Sec.School
- D.S.Public School.
- Vivekananda World School
