= Bellary Cantonment =

- Cantonment Area
- Location in Karnataka, India
- Coordinates: 15°09′11″N 76°53′29″E
- Country: India
- State: Karnataka
- District: Ballari
- Established: 1800
- Founder: British Indian Army

Government
  - Type: Cantonment board

Languages
  - Official: Kannada
- Time zone: UTC+5:30 (IST)

Bellary Cantonment, was a cantonment area in Madras Presidency in the British Raj (part of present day Bellary in Karnataka). It fell under British administration in 1800, and was the headquarters of the Bellary District, in the Southern Division of Madras, in 1840. The Imperial Gazetteer of India (1909) states, "Until the British made Bellary a cantonment it contained little but its fort". The cantonment grew to be one of the largest in southern India, second only to Madras. After First War of Independence, a military prison (Alipore Jail), and associated facilities were constructued in the cantonment. The prisoners of war (PoW) of the world war were kept here by the British. After World War I the British military withdrew, and the cantonment was largely decommissioned.

In the post-independence era many of its buildings were repurposed for civilian use. Today the former cantonment area is integrated into Bellary city, with little remaining of its old military role. As of now the cantonment is without any military activity. Even though, the area is still called as 'Cantonment' and with some urbanization. The Alipore Jail is still being used as a Medical college.

== History ==
Ballari was under British administration from 1799, after the defeat of Tippu Sultan and the cession of territory by the Nizam of Hyderabad. In 1800–1801 the British made Ballari a district headquarters and established a permanent cantonment on the hill’s western slopes. Then Governor Sir Thomas Munro, the newly appointed Collector, advised the setting up of the cantonment. This choice was influenced by the commanding Bellary Fort, which the British rated as a first-class fortress whose prominence “led to its selection as the site for a cantonment”. By the 1820s, colonial records show that Ballari had become a military garrison and cantonment under Madras Presidency administration. British sources later described Bellary as “one of the chief military stations in southern India,” garrisoned by both British and Indian troops.

Throughout the 19th century, the cantonment played a key role in British military operations in the Deccan. High-ranking officers were posted there (for example, the future Duke of Wellington served in the early 1800s), and regiments such as the 63rd Foot took up quarters in Bellary’s barracks. Part of the infantry barracks was even converted into a military prison known as the Alipore Jail, used to detain prisoners of war. Bellary remained an important station through the late colonial period; its strategic location made it a communications hub, famously serving as a stopover on the early 20th-century inland airmail route between Madras and Karachi.

The last British units withdrew after World War I and after India’s independence, the British military presence in Ballari had ended. The cantonment’s properties were transferred to civil authorities, the Christ the King Church (built for troops) was transferred from the Anglican Church to local Catholic hands in 1939. By the mid-20th century most of the cantonment barracks and the Alipore Jail had been handed over to civilian institutions. The Alipore Jail block was later converted into Ballari Government Medical College.

== Layout and Infrastructure ==
The Bellary Cantonment has a rectangular layout and is located to the west of Bellary Fort, on the Ballari Gudda hill. Historical accounts describe it as a self-contained military quarter with troop accommodations, offices, and support facilities. The cantonment included barrack complexes for infantry, cavalry and artillery units, along with parade grounds and supply depots. The colonial-era School of Musketry was also located here by the 1890s. A prominent feature of the cantonment was its Protestant church. A new Christ Church was built in the cantonment in 1816 by British military engineers, using local granite and limestone at considerable expense. This structure was later turned over to the Catholic mission after the army left.

The lower fortifications at the hill’s base, which formed part of the old Bellary Fort complex contained ancillary facilities such as a commissariat store, orphanage, Masonic lodge, post office, and private residences. Another significant facility was the Alipore Jail. In the late 19th century the British converted part of the cantonment’s infantry barracks into a high-security military prison. This prison included solitary-confinement cells and housed foreign POWs and later political detainees. After independence it was briefly used as a civilian prison. The remaining structures (14 blocks) were eventually repurposed for the Government Medical College, and only one block survives today as the Swatantra Smarak (Independence Memorial) complex. The cantonment had golf links, race course, a large military hospital and barracks for all segments of the army. Wellington and Edward Williams served as officers in this cantonment.

== Military role ==
Bellary Cantonment served as a major garrison town within the Madras Presidency and was recognized as the second-largest military station in southern India after Madras. Regiments such as the 63rd Foot were stationed here, and the cantonment played a significant role in supporting operations across the southern Deccan. The Alipore Jail took on particular importance during the early 20th century. Following the Malabar Rebellion, over 2,000 Moplah detainees were transferred to Bellary in 1920. The cantonment’s existing prison facilities allowed the colonial administration to manage large-scale internment operations during this period. By the 1920s, Bellary's military relevance had declined, and the British began to scale down operations. By 1930, the cantonment was decommissioned. The last regiments were withdrawn, and remaining properties were gradually turned over to civilian authorities.
