= Amritsar Cantonment =

- Census Town
- Location in Punjab, India Amritsar Cantonment (India)
- Coordinates: 31.6666°N 74.8424°E
- Country: India
- State: Punjab
- District: Amritsar

Population (2001)
  - Total: 11,300

Languages
  - Official: Punjabi
- Time zone: UTC+5:30 (IST)

Amritsar Cantonment is a cantonment town in Amritsar District in the state of Punjab, India.

== Demographics ==
As of 2001 India census, Amritsar Cantonment had a population of 11,300. Males constitute 63% of the population and females 37%. Amritsar Cantonment has an average literacy rate of 81%, higher than the national average of 59.5%; with 66% of the males and 34% of females literate. 11% of the population is under 6 years of age.
