= Aurangabad Cantonment =

Chhatrapati Sambhajinagar Cantonment
- city
- Location in Maharashtra, India
- Coordinates: 19.88°N 75.30°E
- Country: India
- State: Maharashtra
- Region: Marathwada
- District: Chhatrapati Sambhajinagar

Area
  - Total: 10.45 km^{2} (4.03 sq mi)
- Elevation: 556 m (1,824 ft)

Population (2001)
  - Total: 19,274
  - Density: 1,844/km^{2} (4,777/sq mi)

Languages
  - Official: Marathi, Urdu
- Time zone: UTC+5:30 (IST)
- PIN: 431 002
- Telephone code: 0240
- Website: dramavii.com

Aurangabad Cantonment (Chawni), is a cantonment town in Aurangabad district in the state of Maharashtra, India.

== History ==
The Aurangabad City was founded in 1610 by Malik Ambar, the Prime Minister of Murtuza Nizam Shah II, on the site of a village called Khadki.

In 1653, Prince Aurangzeb son of Shahjahan, the Emperor of Delhi was appointed Viceroy of Deccan. Aurangzeb became emperor in 1658. From 1681 till his death in 1707, he was in the Deccan. Most of his time in the south was spent in Aurangabad.

Along with Aurangzeb many RAJPUT Princes came from the north as his allies. Such princes were called ‘Rajas’. These Rajas settled around Aurangabad in small camps called 'Puras'. One of these was Rao Karansingh, the king of Bikaner (Rajasthan). He supported Aurangzeb in the Battle of Samugarh (1658) to annex the throne. Impressed by his act, Aurangzeb granted him three villages. He named them as Karanpura, Padampura & Kesrsingpura.

After the decline of the Mughal Empire in the early eighteenth century, Aurangabad was ruled by Subedars of Mughals. One of them, Kamruddin Chin-Kulich Khan, famously known as Nizam Ul Mulk formed his own kingdom. He shifted his capital from Aurangabad to Hyderabad. Since Aurangabad was near the Maratha's kingdom the Nizam always had conflict with the Peshwas.

For a century Aurangabad was only an Army base. But after conclusion of Anglo-Maratha War in 1819 the Nizam formed the Cantonment with many European officers who came to train the Nizam's Army. This was not a Cantonment but an administrative area underBritish supervision. Here artillery and cavalry were established by the Nizam for the protection of his kingdom. The expenditure incurred on this account was borne by the Nizam and the Nizam owned the Cantonment.

Up to 1836, the Nizam's Cantonment was located somewhere in the Osmanpura side. Then the camp shifted to the area between Harsul and Bibi Ka Maqbara.

Aurangabad Cantonment Board was established in 1890 under the Ministry of Defense for administration of the Cantonment area.

In 1903, a treaty was signed between the British and the Nizam and it was decided to establish a proper Cantonment. All villages belonging to Bikaner Riyasat (namely Karanpura, Padampura, Kesarsinghpura and Konkanwadi) were transferred to the British. The area was approximately 919 acres (3.72 km^{2}). In view of military convenience, an area of 396 acres (1.60 km^{2}) out of the above land was exchanged with an area of 1044 Acres of Banewadi village and other Khalsa area of the Nizam's dominion in 1913. Hence the military authorities had at their disposal a total area of 1,367 acres (5.53 km^{2}) in Aurangabad.

Out of the above land some land was used for purely military purpose with some remaining for agricultural and residential purposes.

In the future the civil area was developed and the Cantonment was defined under the Cantonment Act, 1924. Today the Cantonment is spread across 2,584 acres (10.46 km^{2}) with a civil population of 19,274 as per 2001 census.

== Aurangabad Cantonment Board ==
The Aurangabad Cantonment Board was established in 1890 is the municipal organization under the Ministry of Defense for the Cantonment area.
Cantonment Boards are special local self Government bodies created to administer the Cantonments in India. These institutions have an historical past associated with military administration in India.

=== Organisation ===
Cantonment Boards are a special form of municipal bodies for civic administration in the Cantonments in India. There are 62 Cantonments in India defined under the Cantonment Act, 1924. These Cantonment Boards are autonomous bodies set up and controlled by the Central Government under the provisions of the Cantonments Act, 1924. While the responsibility of direct field administration of the Cantonments is discharged through the Cantonment Boards, supervisory and control functions over the working of these bodies are exercised through the General Officer Commanding-in-Chief of the Command with the advice of the Principal Director Defence Estates at the intermediate level and by the Central Government at the highest level.

The Cantonments have been set up for quartering troops and, therefore, have to serve the basic civic amenities of the Armed Forces as are required in relation to the residential area for officers and men, open spaces for training, sports and recreation facilities and other establishments. In addition to providing the civic services to these areas the Cantonment Boards are required to provide municipal and civic services to the civil population of the Cantonments as well. Because of the nature of Cantonments, a high degree of efficiency and municipal performance level is expected from the Cantonment Boards.

The Cantonment Boards are Statutorily constituted corporate bodies. The Boards generally comprise the democratically elected representatives of the civilian population and nominated members from the Armed Forces and District administration.

=== Functions of the Cantonment Board ===
- 1. Water supply to the Civil Area,
- 2. Sanitation and Health services to both civil and armed forces,
- 3. Maintenance and development of roads,
- 4. Management of Defence land (Old Grant/Leased/Freehold/Private)
  - • Mutation and transfer,
  - • Conversion of old grant properties into freehold,
  - • Sanction of building plans for repairs and reconstruction,
  - • Dealing with any litigation regarding Defence Land.
  - • Prevention and removal of encroachment on the Government land.,
- 5. Education: Run the Schools and provide civic amenities to the schools in the Cantonment Area. The Aurangabad Cantonment Board does not run any school.
- 6. Public improvement works :
  - • Development and maintenance of gardens
  - • Tree planting
  - • Development and maintenance of culverts and drainage lines
  - • Establishing and maintaining civil defence services
- 7. Conducting elections of the Cantonment Board as per CER, 1945.
- 8. Registration of births & deaths,
- 9. Town planning,
- 10. Monitoring trade and markets,
- 11. Group housing and shops,
- 12. Providing street lighting,
- 13. Providing conservancy services to the Armed forces,
- 14. Maintaining Defence land and land records under the management of the Cantonment Board,

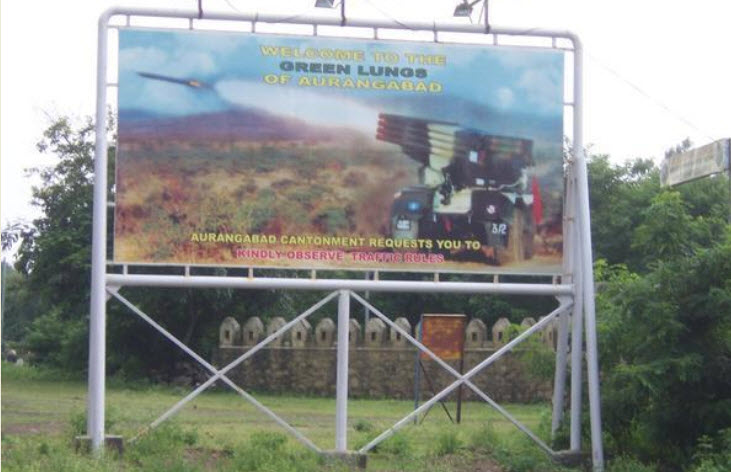
Aurangabad cantonment Aurangabad.

=== Achievement ===
The Cantonment is the greenest area of Aurangabad city. Animals like Deers, Monkeys, Mongoose Field Rats and few leopards have taken a shelter in the vast green region of the Aurangabad Cantonment.

The Cantonment Board Aurangabad has traditionally maintained high standard of civic administration. In the field of public health and sanitation, the Cantonment Board Aurangabad has a task to accomplish in the context of the welfare of the citizens of Cantonment Area. No epidemic out-breaks has taken place in the history of the Cantonment Board Aurangabad.

== Army Golf Course ==
Aurangabad cantonment houses Sarvatra Ecological Park and Training Area (SEPTA). Besides several other training facilities, the park also has a nine-hole golf course. It is the only course in the Marathwada region. It is a sought after facility with corporate and civil officers also seeking membership. This golf course was laid by the British and finds mention in the old revenue maps of Aurangabad Cantonment. The golf course was realigned and relaid in 1985. Since then this course has been improved further.
