= Roorkee Cantonment =

- Cantonment town
- Location in Uttarakhand, India Roorkee Cantonment (India)
- Coordinates: 29.87°N 77.88°E
- Country: India
- State: Uttarakhand
- District: Haridwar
- Elevation: 284 m (932 ft)

Population (2001)
  - Total: 17,747

Languages
  - Official: Hindi
- Time zone: UTC+5:30 (IST)
- Vehicle registration: UK 17
- Website: roorkee.cantt.gov.in

Roorkee Cantonment is a cantonment town, in Roorkee, Haridwar district in the Indian state of Uttarakhand, and is one of country's oldest cantonments established in 1803, and the headquarters of Bengal Engineer Group (Bengal Sappers) since 1853.

== History ==
Roorkee became home to the Bengal Sappers and Miners in 1853, and two artillery units were stationed here. Today, the cantonment has a large army base with headquarters for 'Bengal Engineer Group' (BEG), also known as Bengal Sappers, established in 1853, in 1901 the population of the cantonment had grown to 2951.

== Demographics ==
As of 2001 India census, Roorkee Cantonment had a population of 17,747. Males constitute 61% of the population and females 39%. Roorkee has an average literacy rate of 87%, higher than the national average of 59.5%: male literacy is 92%, and female literacy is 76%. In Roorkee, 10% of the population is under 6 years of age.
