= Nainital Cantonment =

- Cantonment town
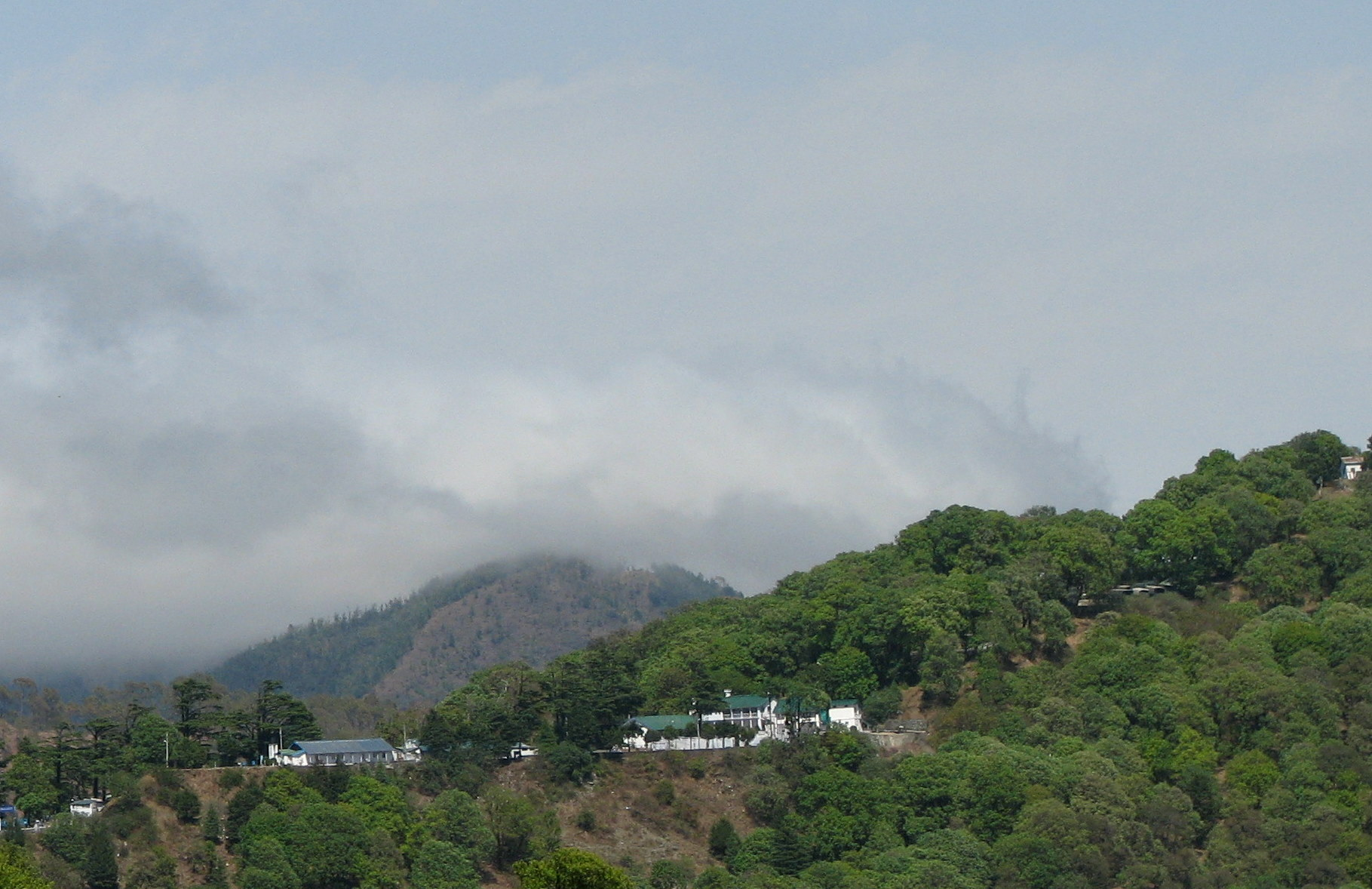

- Location in Uttarakhand, India Nainital Cantonment (India)
- Coordinates: 29.38°N 79.47°E
- Country: India
- State: Uttarakhand
- District: Nainital

Population (2001)
  - Total: 1,281

Languages
  - Official: Hindi
- Time zone: UTC+5:30 (IST)
- Vehicle registration: UK
- Website: cbnainital.org.in

Nainital Cantonment is a cantonment town in Nainital district in the Indian state of Uttarakhand, close to the hill station of Nainital. Established in the year 1878, today the Nainital Cantonment is a Class IV cantonment. Current CEO of cantonment board is Shri Varun Kumar.

== Geography ==
Nainital Cantonment is located at 29.38°N 79.47°E.

== Demographics ==
As of 2001 India census, Nainital Cantonment had a population of 1281. Males constitute 52% of the population and females 48%. Nainital Cantonment has an average literacy rate of 82%, higher than the national average of 59.5%: male literacy is 86%, and female literacy is 78%. In Nainital Cantonment, 8% of the population is under 6 years of age.
