= Jammu Cantonment =

- cantonment
- Location in Jammu and Kashmir, India Jammu Cantonment (India)
- Coordinates: 32.706329°N 74.854065°E
- Country: India
- Union Territory: Jammu and Kashmir
- District: Jammu

Government
  - Body: Cantonment Board Jammu

Area
  - Total: 3 km^{2} (1.2 sq mi)

Population (2001)
  - Total: 30,123
  - Density: 10,000/km^{2} (26,000/sq mi)
- Demonym: Jammuities

Languages
  - Official: Urdu, Dogri, Hindi
- Time zone: UTC+5:30 (IST)
- Vehicle registration: JK02
- Website: www.cbjammu.org

Jammu Cantonment is a cantonment town in Jammu City in the Indian union territory of Jammu and Kashmir.

== Demographics ==
As of 2001 India census, Jammu Cantonment had a population of 30,107. Males constitute 61% of the population and females 39%. Jammu Cantonment has an average literacy rate of 74%, higher than the national average of 59.5%: male literacy is 80%, and female literacy is 64%. In Jammu Cantonment, 15% of the population is under 6 years of age.

== Religion ==
Hindu 69.43%, Sikh 18.11%, Muslim 10.91%,
