= St Jude High School (Pune) =

Coordinates: 18.687100°N 73.722915°E

- Pune, Maharashtra; India

Information
- Type: Co-Educational
- Motto: Teach us the Right Way
- Established: 11 June 1953; 73 years ago
- Principal: Fr. Pravin Pawar
- Enrollment: 3000
- Campus: 22 acres
- Houses: Blue, Green, Red, Yellow
- Nickname: Judians

St. Jude High School, previously known as Garrison High School, is a Roman Catholic minority school in Pune, Maharashtra, India. Earlier it was known as Garrison High School and was managed by the local military authority. In June 1953, the military authority approached the Poona Catholic Education Association (PCEA) with a request to take over the management of the school; which was willingly done. It gives due preference to the economically backward and socially marginalized students at the time of admissions and they are helped with various concessions.
