= Belgaum Cantonment =

- City
- Location in Karnataka, India
- Coordinates: 15.86°N 74.5°E
- Country: India
- State: Karnataka
- District: Belgaum district
- Established: 1832
- Founder: East India Company

Government
  - Type: Cantonment Board
  - Body: Belgaum Cantonment Board

Population (2001)
  - Total: 23,678

Languages
  - Official: Kannada
- Time zone: UTC+5:30 (IST)

Belgaum Cantonment is a cantonment in Belgaum district in the state of Karnataka, India.

== Demographics ==
As of 2001 India census, Belgaum Cantonment had a population of 23,678. Males constitute 59% of the population and females 41%. 10% of the population is under 6 years of age.
