= Ahmedabad Cantonment =

- City
- Location in Gujarat, India Ahmedabad Cantonment (Gujarat) Ahmedabad Cantonment (India)
- Coordinates: 23.04768°N 72.609871°E
- Country: India
- State: Gujarat
- District: Ahmedabad
- Established: 1830
- Founder: Sir J. Malcolm

Population (2011)
  - Total: 14,345

Languages
  - Official: Gujarati, English
- Time zone: UTC+5:30 (IST)
- Vehicle registration: GJ
- Website: gujaratindia.com

Ahmedabad Cantonment is situated between Ahmedabad city and Gandhinagar in the state of Gujarat in India.

== History ==
The cantonment site was chosen by Sir J. Malcolm in 1830 and established in 1833.

== Demographics ==
As of 2011 census, Ahmedabad Cantonment had a population of 14,345. Ahmedabad Cantonment has an average literacy rate of 81%.
