= Shillong Cantonment =

- Cantonment Town
- Location in Meghalaya, India Shillong Cantonment (India)
- Coordinates: 25.5667°N 91.8833°E
- Country: India
- State: Meghalaya
- District: East Khasi Hills

Population (2001)
  - Total: 12,385

Languages
  - Official: English
- Time zone: UTC+5:30 (IST)
- Vehicle registration: ML

Shillong Cantonment is a cantonment town in East Khasi Hills district in the Indian state of Meghalaya.

== Demographics ==
As of the 2001 India census, Shillong Cantonment had a population of 12,385. Males constitute 57% of the population and females 43%. Shillong Cantonment has an average literacy rate of 74%, higher than the national average of 59.5%: male literacy is 78%, and female literacy is 69%. In Shillong Cantonment, 12% of the population is under 6 years of age.
