= Ayodhya Cantonment =

- Cantonment Area
- Location in Uttar Pradesh, India
- Coordinates: 26.796444°N 82.133665°E
- Country: India
- State: Uttar Pradesh
- District: Ayodhya
- Established: 1858
- Founder: British Indian Army

Government
  - Type: Cantonment board
  - Body: Ayodhya Cantonment Board, Ministry of Defence

Area
  - Total: 19.68 km^{2} (7.60 sq mi)

Population (2011)
  - Total: 12,391
  - Density: 629.6/km^{2} (1,631/sq mi)

Languages
  - Official: Hindi, Awadhi
- Time zone: UTC+5:30 (IST)
- Vehicle registration: UP 42 GT
- Website: ayodhya.cantt.gov.in

Ayodhya Cantonment (or Ayodhya Cantt) is a cantonment town in Ayodhya district in the Indian state of Uttar Pradesh, close to the city of Ayodhya. Established in the year 1858, today it is a Class I cantonment. The official name was changed from Faizabad Cantonment to Ayodhya Cantonment in October 2022 by the Government of India.

== Demographics ==
The 2011 Census of India showed that Ayodhya Cantonment had a population of 12,391 in 2,014 households.

- There were 7,744 males and 4,647 females. The sex ratio was 600.1 females per 1,000 males.
- There were 1,368 children of six and under: 716 boys and 652 girls, giving a sex ratio of 910.6 girls per 1,000 boys.
- There were 9,783 literates (89% of the population over six), of which 6,595 were male and 3,188 were female (85% and 69% of the male and female population over six).

Historical population of Ayodhya Cantonment
Year	Pop.	±%
1931	5,726	—
1941	2,417	−57.8%
1951	5,916	+144.8%
1961	4,579	−22.6%
1971	6,971	+52.2%
1981	10,794	+54.8%
1991	11,843	+9.7%
2001	14,040	+18.6%
2011	12,391	−11.7%

Religions in Ayodhya Cantonment (2011)
1. Hinduism (90.9%)
2. Islam (7.29%)
3. Christianity (1.48%)
4. Others (0.16%)
5. Not Stated (0.21%)
