= Postogola Cantonment =

Bangladeshi military cantonment

- পোস্তগোলা সেনানিবাস
- Country: Bangladesh
- Branch: Bangladesh Army

Postogola Cantonment (Note: Bengali: পোস্তগোলা সেনানিবাস, romanized: Pōstagōlā sēnānibāsa) (Note: Multiple references:) is a cantonment in Dhaka, Bangladesh. At least 2 riverine battalions are situated in the cantonment.

== Installations ==
- 5 RE Battalion
- 7 RE Battalion

== Education ==
- Riverview Cantonment Board School

== Gallery ==
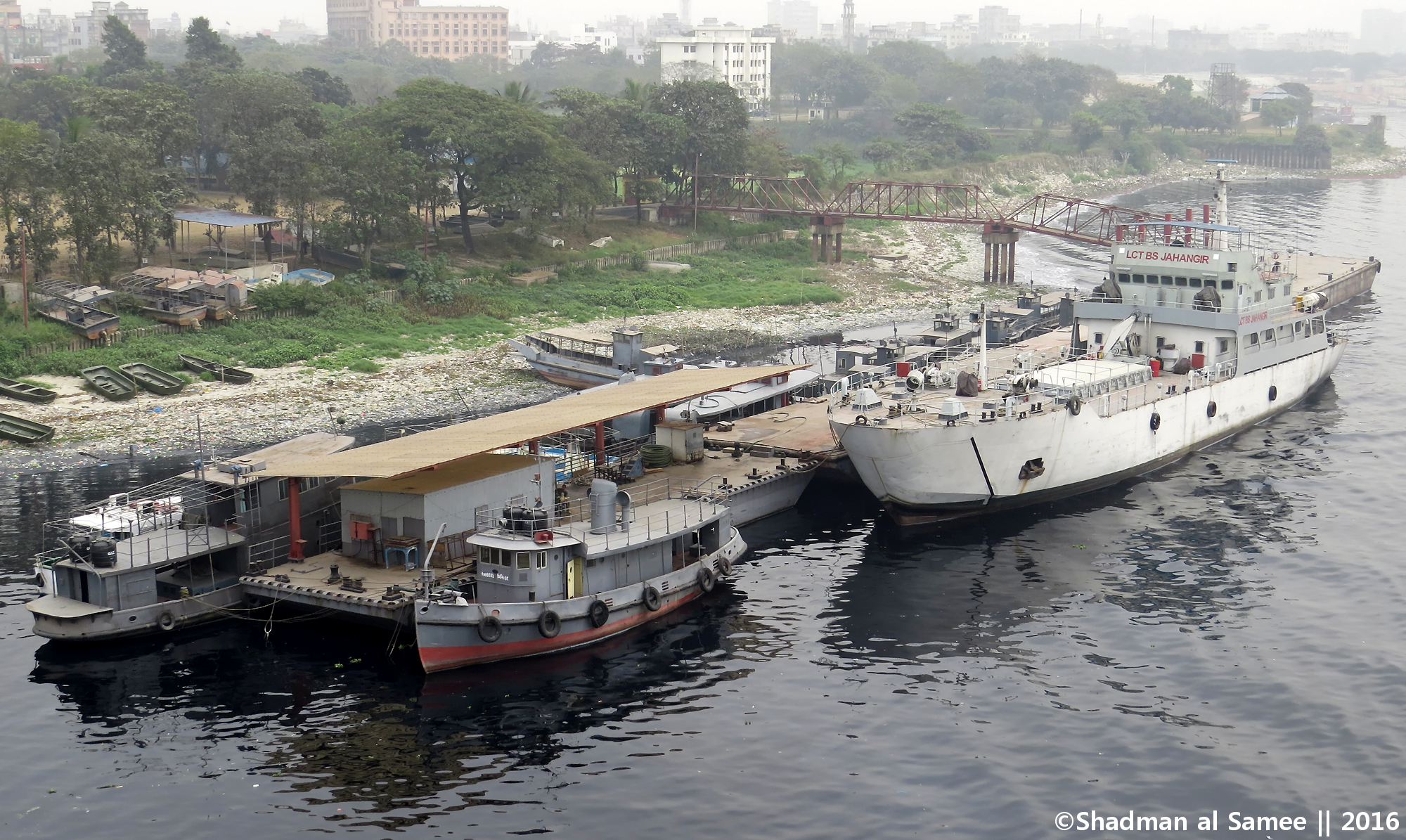
Bangladesh Army jetty at Postogola Cantonment

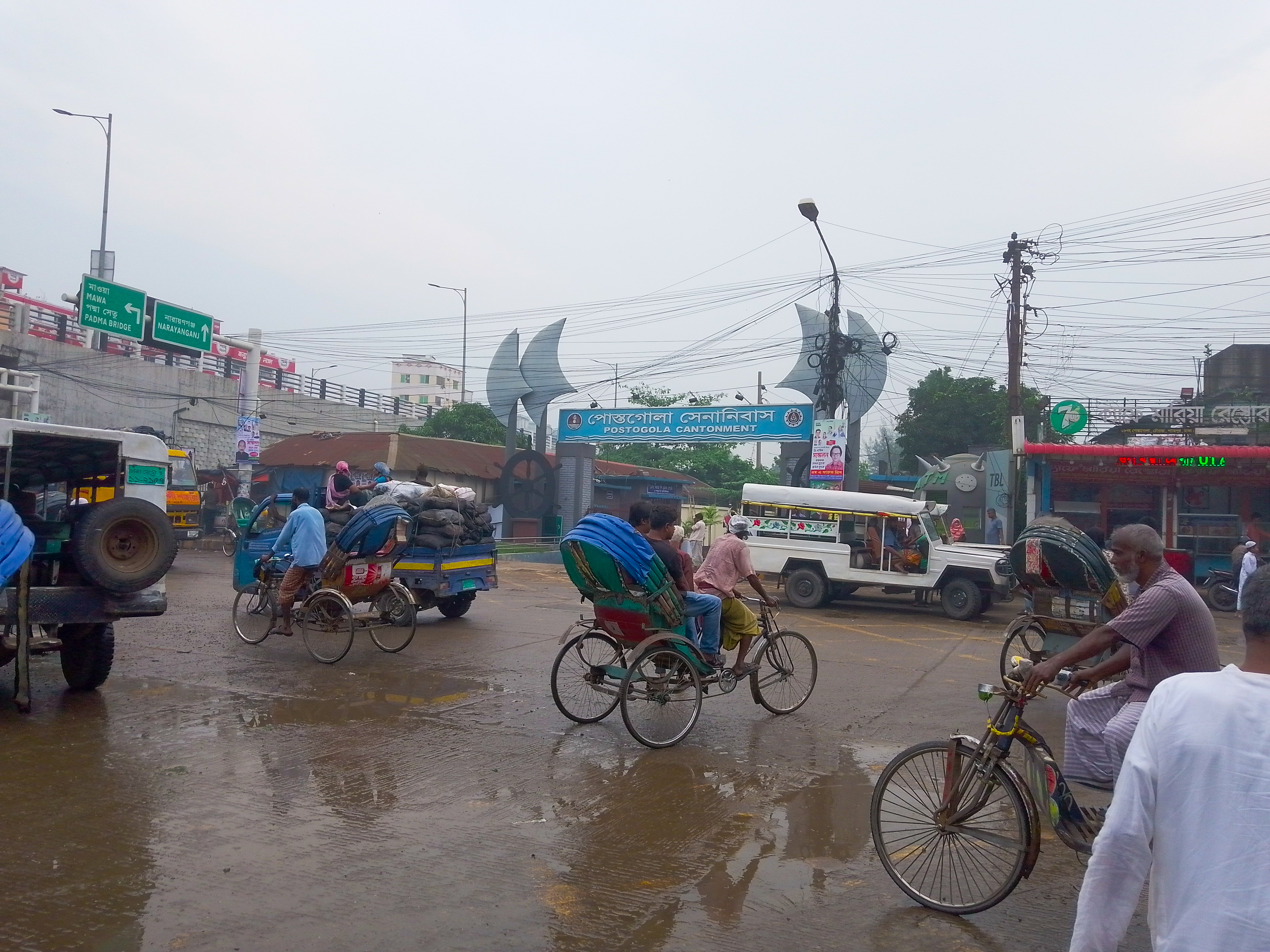
Front Gate of Postogola Cantonment

== See also ==
- List of formations of the Bangladesh Army
- Guimara Cantonment
