= Jabalpur Cantonment =

Jabalpur Army Station
- city
- Location in Madhya Pradesh, India Jabalpur Army Station (India)
- Coordinates: 23.15°N 79.97°E
- Country: India
- State: Madhya Pradesh
- District: Jabalpur

Government
  - Type: Municipal corporation

Population (2011)
  - Total: 72,257

Languages
  - Official: Hindi
- Time zone: UTC+5:30 (IST)
- ISO 3166 code: IN-MP
- Vehicle registration: MP

Jabalpur Army Station is an Army station town in Jabalpur District in the Indian state of Madhya Pradesh.

== Demographics ==
As of 2011 India census, Jabalpur Army Station had a population of 72,257. Males constitute 59% of the population and females 41%. Jabalpur Army Station has an average literacy rate of 91.79%, higher than the national average of 74.04%: male literacy is 95.22%, and female literacy is 86.86%. In Jabalpur Army station, 8.54% of the population is under 6 years of age.
