= Varanasi cantonment =

- Town
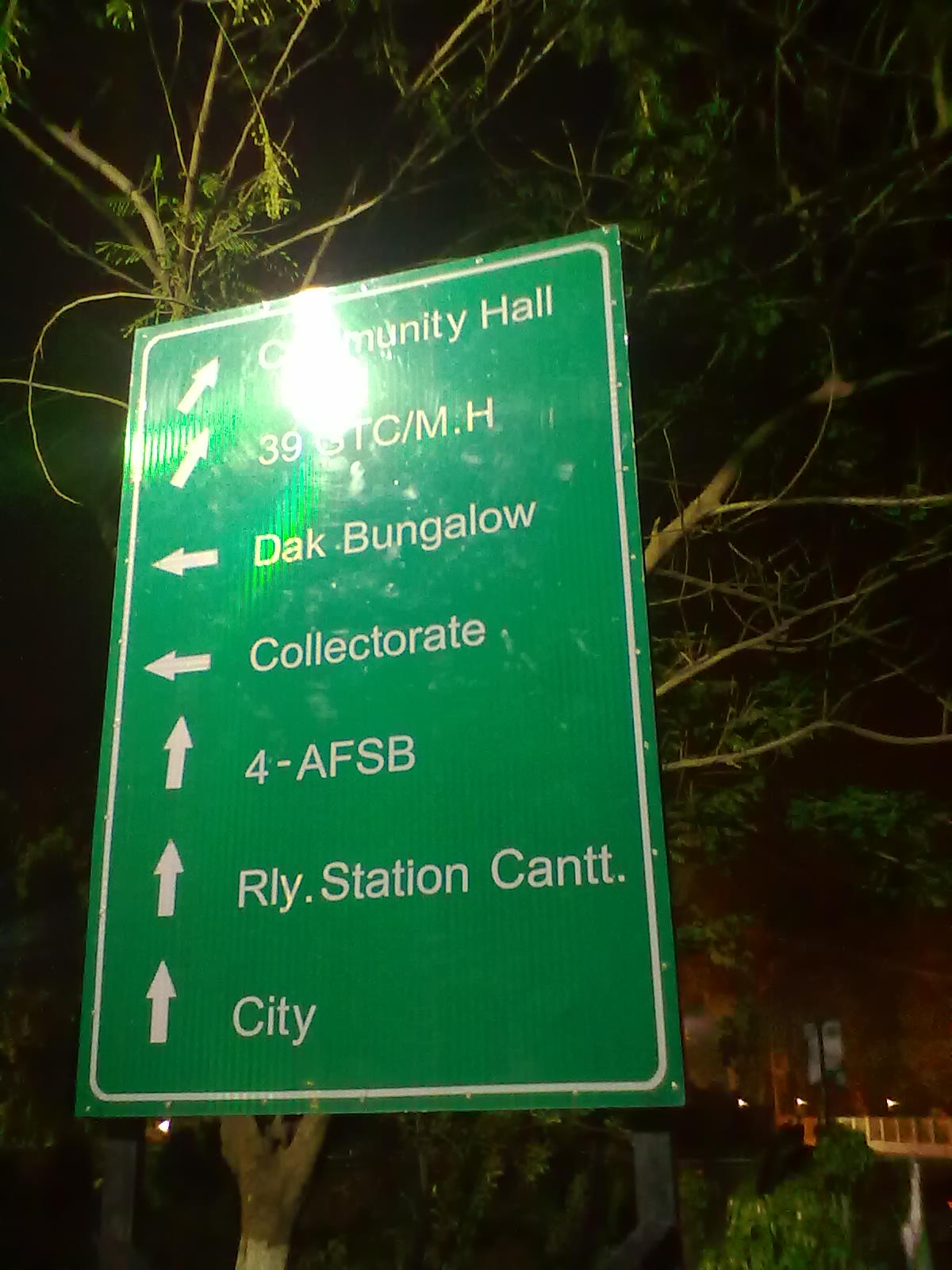
- Direction board in Varanasi cantonment

- Town location on Varanasi district map
- Coordinates: 25.337347°N 82.979569°E
- Country: India
- State: Uttar Pradesh
- District: Varanasi district
- Tehsil: Varanasi tehsil
- Elevation: 82.96 m (272.2 ft)

Population (2011)
  - Total: 14,119

Languages
  - Official: Hindi & English
- Time zone: UTC+5:30 (IST)
- Postal code: 221002
- Telephone code: +91-542
- Vehicle registration: UP65 XXXX
- Census town code: 801233
- Lok Sabha constituency: Varanasi (Lok Sabha constituency)
- Vidhan Sabha constituency: Varanasi Cantt.

Varanasi cantonment is a census town in Varanasi tehsil of Varanasi district in the Indian state of Uttar Pradesh. The census town does not have a gram panchayat. Varanasi Cantonment Census town is about 2 kilometers West of Varanasi railway station, 324 kilometers South-East of Lucknow and 12 kilometers North of Banaras Hindu University.

== Demography ==
Varanasi cantonment has 2,760 families with a total population of 14,119. Sex ratio of the census town is 824 and child sex ratio is 827. Uttar Pradesh state average for both ratios is 912 and 902 respectively ^{[note]}.

Details	Male	Female	Total	Comments
Number of houses	-	-	2760	(census 2011)
Adult	7,742	6,377	12,685	(census 2011)
Children	-	-	1,434	(census 2011)
Total population	-	-	14,119	(census 2011)
Literacy	92.3%	81.2%	87.3%	(census 2011)

== Transportation ==
Varanasi cantonment is connected by air (Lal Bahadur Shastri Airport), by train (Varanasi railway station) and by road. Nearest operational airports is Lal Bahadur Shastri Airport and nearest operational railway station is Varanasi railway station (22 and 2 kilometers respectively from Varanasi Cantonment).

== See also ==
- Varanasi Cantt. (Assembly constituency)
- Varanasi district
- Varanasi (Lok Sabha constituency)
- Varanasi tehsil

== Notes ==
- All demographic data is based on 2011 Census of India.
