= Badhauna =

- Village
- Village location on Varanasi district map Badhauna (Uttar Pradesh) Badhauna (India)
- Coordinates: 25.556938°N 82.861370°E
- Country: India
- State: Uttar Pradesh
- District: Varanasi district
- Tehsil: Pindra
- Elevation: 82.000 m (269.029 ft)

Population (2011)
  - Total: 2,306

Languages
  - Official: Hindi
- Time zone: UTC+5:30 (IST)
- Postal code: 221206
- Telephone code: +91-5450
- Vehicle registration: UP65 XXXX
- Village code: 208594
- Lok Sabha constituency: Varanasi
- Vidhan Sabha constituency: Pindra

Badhauna is a village in Pindra Tehsil of Varanasi district in the Indian state of Uttar Pradesh. The village falls under gram panchayat by the same name as the village. The village is about 41 km (25 mi) northwest of Varanasi city, 253 km (157 mi) southeast of state capital Lucknow and 811 km (504 mi) southeast of the national capital Delhi.

== Demography ==
Badhauna has 315 families with the total population of 2,306. Sex ratio of the village is 1,064 and child sex ratio is 930. Uttar Pradesh state average for both ratios is 912 and 902 respectively ^{[note]}.

Details	Male	Female	Total	Comments
Number of houses	-	-	315	(census 2011)
Adult	932	1,017	1,949	(census 2011)
Children (0–6 years)	185	172	357	(census 2011)
Total population	1,117	1,189	2,306	(census 2011)
Literacy	81.44%	53.88%	67.06%	(census 2011)

== Transportation ==
Badhauna is connected by air (Lal Bahadur Shastri Airport), train (Babatpur railway station) and by road. The nearest operational airports are Varanasi airport (23 km [14 mi] south) and Allahabad Airports (150 km [93 mi] west).

== See also ==
- Pindra Tehsil
- Pindra (Assembly constituency)

== Notes ==
- All demographic data is based on 2011 Census of India.
