= Bachaura =

- Village
- Village location on Varanasi district map Bachaura (Uttar Pradesh) Bachaura (India)
- Coordinates: 25.488808°N 82.763030°E
- Country: India
- State: Uttar Pradesh
- District: Varanasi district
- Tehsil: Pindra
- Elevation: 84.230 m (276.35 ft)

Population (2011)
  - Total: 1,746

Languages
  - Official: Hindi
- Time zone: UTC+5:30 (IST)
- Postal code: 221207
- Telephone code: +91-542
- Vehicle registration: UP65 XXXX
- Village code: 208442
- Lok Sabha constituency: Varanasi
- Vidhan Sabha constituency: Pindra

Bachaura is a village in Pindra Tehsil of Varanasi district in the Indian state of Uttar Pradesh. The village falls under gram panchayat by the same name as the village. The village is about 34 kilometers North-West of Varanasi city, 273 kilometers South-East of state capital Lucknow and 794 kilometers South-East of the national capital Delhi.

== Demography ==
Bachaura has a total population of 1,746 people amongst 284 families. Sex ratio of the village is 1,030 and child sex ratio is 846. Uttar Pradesh state average for both ratios is 912 and 902 respectively ^{[note]}.

Details	Male	Female	Total	Comments
Number of houses	-	-	284	(census 2011)
Adult	704	754	1,458	(census 2011)
Children (0–6 years)	156	132	288	(census 2011)
Total population	860	886	1,746	(census 2011)
Literacy	85.51%	57.29%	70.92%	(census 2011)

== Transportation ==
Bachaura can be accessed by air (Lal Bahadur Shastri Airport), train (Babatpur railway station) and by road. Nearest operational airports are Varanasi airport (16 kilometers) and Allahabad Airports (134 kilometres West).

== See also ==
- Pindra Tehsil
- Pindra (Assembly constituency)

== Notes ==
- All demographic data is based on 2011 Census of India.
