= Basni =

- Village
- Village location on Varanasi district map Basni (Uttar Pradesh) Basni (India)
- Coordinates: 25.443454°N 82.829055°E
- Country: India
- State: Uttar Pradesh
- District: Varanasi district
- Tehsil: Pindra
- Elevation: 87.399 m (286.74 ft)

Population (2011)
  - Total: 9,421

Languages
  - Official: Hindi
- Time zone: UTC+5:30 (IST)
- Postal code: 221204
- Telephone code: +91-542
- Vehicle registration: UP65 XXXX
- Village code: 208486
- Lok Sabha constituency: Varanasi
- Vidhan Sabha constituency: Pindra

Basni is a village in Pindra Tehsil of Varanasi district in the Indian state of Uttar Pradesh. The village falls under gram panchayat by the same name as the village. The village is about 26 kilometres North-West of Varanasi city, 262 kilometres South-East of state capital Lucknow and 794 kilometres South-East of the national capital Delhi.

== Demography ==
Basni has a total population of 9,421 people amongst 1,377 families. Sex ratio of the village is 924 and child sex ratio is 844. Uttar Pradesh state average for both ratios is 912 and 902 respectively ^{[note]}.

Details	Male	Female	Total	Comments
Number of houses	–	–	1,377	(census 2011)
Adult	4,203	3,904	8,143	(census 2011)
Children (0–6 years)	693	585	1,278	(census 2011)
Total population	4,896	4,525	9,421	(census 2011)
Literacy	85.63%	62.49%	74.43%	(census 2011)

== Transportation ==
Basni can be accessed by air (Lal Bahadur Shastri Airport), train (Babatpur railway station) and by road. Nearest operational airports are Varanasi airport (8 kilometres) and Allahabad Airports (133 kilometres West).

== See also ==
- Pindra Tehsil
- Pindra (Assembly constituency)

== Notes ==
- All demographic data is based on 2011 Census of India.
