= Baghaita =

- Village
- Village location on Varanasi district map Baghaita (Uttar Pradesh) Baghaita (India)
- Coordinates: 25.425203°N 82.892997°E
- Country: India
- State: Uttar Pradesh
- District: Varanasi district
- Tehsil: Pindra
- Elevation: 83.131 m (272.74 ft)

Population (2011)
  - Total: 41

Languages
  - Official: Hindi
- Time zone: UTC+5:30 (IST)
- Postal code: 221202
- Telephone code: +91-542
- Vehicle registration: UP65 XXXX
- Village code: 208731
- Lok Sabha constituency: Varanasi
- Vidhan Sabha constituency: Pindra

Baghaita is a village in Pindra Tehsil of Varanasi district in the Indian state of Uttar Pradesh. The village falls under Nihalapur gram panchayat. The village is about 20 kilometers North-West of Varanasi city, 266 kilometers South-East of state capital Lucknow and 804 kilometers South-East of the national capital Delhi.

== Demography ==
Baghaita has 8 families with the total population of 41. Sex ratio of the village is 1,158 and child sex ratio is 5,000. Uttar Pradesh state average for both ratios is 912 and 902 respectively ^{[note]}.

Details	Male	Female	Total	Comments
Number of houses	-	-	8	(census 2011)
Adult	18	17	35	(census 2011)
Children (0–6 years)	1	5	6	(census 2011)
Total population	19	22	41	(census 2011)
Literacy	94.44%	52.94%	74.29%	(census 2011)

== Transportation ==
Baghaita is connected by air (Lal Bahadur Shastri Airport), train (Babatpur railway station) and by road. The nearest operational airports are Varanasi airport (5.5 kilometers South) and Allahabad Airports (143 kilometers West).

== See also ==
- Pindra Tehsil
- Pindra (Assembly constituency)

== Notes ==
- All demographic data is based on 2011 Census of India.
