= Adhkatiya Kala Khas =

- Village
- Village location on Varanasi district map Adhkatiya Kala Khas (Uttar Pradesh) Adhkatiya Kala Khas (India)
- Coordinates: 25.418372°N 82.723250°E
- Country: India
- State: Uttar Pradesh
- District: Varanasi district
- Tehsil: Pindra
- Elevation: 83 m (272 ft)

Population (2011)
  - Total: 67

Languages
  - Official: Hindi
- Time zone: UTC+5:30 (IST)
- Postal code: 221206
- Telephone code: +91-5450
- Vehicle registration: UP65 XXXX
- Village code: 208529
- Lok Sabha constituency: Varanasi
- Vidhan Sabha constituency: Pindra

Adhkatiya Kala Khas (also known as Adhikariya Kala) is a village in Pindra Tehsil of Varanasi district in the Indian state of Uttar Pradesh. Adhkatiya Kala Khas falls under the Tilvar gram panchayat. The village is about 34 kilometers North-West of Varanasi city, 280 kilometers South-East of state capital Lucknow and 783 kilometers South-East of the national capital Delhi.

== Demography ==
Adhkatiya Kala Khas has a total population of 67 people amongst 7 families. Sex ratio of Adhkatiya Kala Khas is 763 and child sex ratio is 400. Uttar Pradesh state average for both ratios is 912 and 902 respectively^{[note]}.

Details	Male	Female	Total	Comments
Number of houses	-	-	7	(census 2011)
Adult	33	27	60	(census 2011)
Children (0–6 years)	5	2	7	(census 2011)
Total population	38	29	67	(census 2011)
Literacy	87.88%	62.96%	76.67%	(census 2011)

== Transportation ==
Adhkatiya Kala Khas can be accessed by road and does not have a railway station of its own. Closest railway station to this village is Babatpur Railway Station (25 kilometres (16 mi) east). Nearest operational airports are Varanasi airport (24.5 kilometres (15.2 mi) east) and Allahabad Airports (122 kilometres (76 mi) west).

== See also ==
- Pindra Tehsil
- Varanasi district

== Notes ==
- All demographic data is based on 2011 Census of India.
