= Baharipur =

- Village
- Village location on Varanasi district map Baharipur (Uttar Pradesh) Baharipur (India)
- Coordinates: 25.428279°N 82.895688°E
- Country: India
- State: Uttar Pradesh
- District: Varanasi district
- Tehsil: Pindra
- Elevation: 84.0 m (275.6 ft)

Population (2011)
  - Total: 1,273

Languages
  - Official: Hindi
- Time zone: UTC+5:30 (IST)
- Postal code: 221202
- Telephone code: +91-542
- Vehicle registration: UP65 XXXX
- Village code: 208710
- Lok Sabha constituency: Varanasi
- Vidhan Sabha constituency: Pindra

Baharipur is a village in Pindra Tehsil of Varanasi district in the Indian state of Uttar Pradesh. The village falls under the Aharak gram panchayat. The village is about 20 kilometers North-West of Varanasi city, 291 kilometers South-East of state capital Lucknow and 805 kilometers South-East of the national capital Delhi.

== Demography ==
Baharipur has 161 families with the total population of 1,273. Sex ratio of the village is 872 and child sex ratio is 581. Uttar Pradesh state average for both ratios is 912 and 902 respectively ^{[note]}.

Details	Male	Female	Total	Comments
Number of houses	-	-	161	(census 2011)
Adult	563	525	1088	(census 2011)
Children (0–6 years)	117	68	185	(census 2011)
Total population	680	593	1273	(census 2011)
Literacy	91.3%	67.05%	79.6%	(census 2011)

== Transportation ==
Baharipur is connected by air (Lal Bahadur Shastri Airport), train (Babatpur railway station) and by road. The nearest operational airports are Varanasi airport (5 kilometers South-East) and Allahabad Airports (143 kilometers West).

== See also ==
- Pindra Tehsil
- Pindra (Assembly constituency)

== Notes ==
- All demographic data is based on 2011 Census of India.
