= Arazi Tari =

- Village
- Village location on Varanasi district map Arazi Tari (Uttar Pradesh) Arazi Tari (India)
- Coordinates: 25.459530°N 82.751571°E
- Country: India
- State: Uttar Pradesh
- District: Varanasi district
- Tehsil: Pindra
- Elevation: 82.037 m (269.15 ft)

Population (2011)
  - Total: 78

Languages
  - Official: Hindi
- Time zone: UTC+5:30 (IST)
- Postal code: 221206
- Telephone code: +91-542
- Vehicle registration: UP65 XXXX
- Village code: 208462
- Lok Sabha constituency: Varanasi
- Vidhan Sabha constituency: Pindra

Arazi Tari is a village in Pindra Tehsil of Varanasi district in the Indian state of Uttar Pradesh. Arazi Tari falls under Sarvipur gram panchayat. The village is about 40 kilometers North-West of Varanasi city, 274 kilometers South-East of state capital Lucknow and 789 kilometers South-East of the national capital Delhi.

== Demography ==
Arazi Tari has a total population of 78 people amongst 9 families. Sex ratio of Arazi Tari is 696 and child sex ratio is 444. Uttar Pradesh state average for both ratios is 912 and 902 respectively ^{[note]}.

Details	Male	Female	Total	Comments
Number of houses	-	-	9	(census 2011)
Adult	37	28	65	(census 2011)
Children (0–6 years)	9	4	13	(census 2011)
Total population	46	32	78	(census 2011)
Literacy	81.08%	78.57%	80.00%	(census 2011)

== Transportation ==
Arazi Tari can be accessed by road and does not have a railway station of its own. Closest railway station to this village is Babatpur railway station (18.5 kilometers East). Nearest operational airports are Varanasi airport (18 kilometers East) and Allahabad Airports (127 kilometers West).

== See also ==
- Pindra Tehsil
- Pindra (Assembly constituency)

== Notes ==
- All demographic data is based on 2011 Census of India.
