= Auraon =

- Village
- Village location on Varanasi district map Auraon (Uttar Pradesh) Auraon (India)
- Coordinates: 25.494240°N 82.853209°E
- Country: India
- State: Uttar Pradesh
- District: Varanasi district
- Tehsil: Pindra
- Elevation: 82.236 m (269.80 ft)

Population (2011)
  - Total: 2,497

Languages
  - Official: Hindi
- Time zone: UTC+5:30 (IST)
- Postal code: 221206
- Telephone code: +91-5450
- Vehicle registration: UP65 XXXX
- Village code: 208639
- Lok Sabha constituency: Varanasi
- Vidhan Sabha constituency: Pindra

Auraon is a village in Pindra Tehsil of Varanasi district in the Indian state of Uttar Pradesh. Auraon has its own gram panchayat by the same name as the village. The village is about 30 kilometers North-West of Varanasi city, 308 kilometers South-East of state capital Lucknow and 800 kilometers South-East of the national capital Delhi.

== Demography ==
Auraon has a total population of 2,497 people amongst 318 families. Sex ratio of Auraon is 925 and child sex ratio is 963. Uttar Pradesh state average for both ratios is 912 and 902 respectively ^{[note]}.

Details	Male	Female	Total	Comments
Number of houses	-	-	318	(census 2011)
Adult	1,110	1,020	2,130	(census 2011)
Children (0–6 years)	187	180	367	(census 2011)
Total population	1,297	1,200	2,497	(census 2011)
Literacy	85.59%	67.35%	76.85%	(census 2011)

== Transportation ==
Auraon can be accessed by road and does not have a railway station of its own. Closest railway station to this village is Babatpur Railway Station (5.8 kilometers South). Nearest operational airports are Varanasi airport (9 kilometers South) and Allahabad Airports (139 kilometers West).

== See also ==
- Pindra Tehsil
- Pindra (Assembly constituency)

== Notes ==
- All demographic data is based on 2011 Census of India.
