= Aswalpur =

- Village
- Village location on Varanasi district map Aswalpur (Uttar Pradesh) Aswalpur (India)
- Coordinates: 25.486072°N 82.812218°E
- Country: India
- State: Uttar Pradesh
- District: Varanasi district
- Tehsil: Pindra
- Elevation: 82.220 m (269.75 ft)

Population (2011)
  - Total: 2,080

Languages
  - Official: Hindi
- Time zone: UTC+5:30 (IST)
- Postal code: 221206
- Telephone code: +91-5450
- Vehicle registration: UP65 XXXX
- Village code: 208650
- Lok Sabha constituency: Varanasi
- Vidhan Sabha constituency: Pindra

Aswalpur is a village in Pindra Tehsil of Varanasi district in the Indian state of Uttar Pradesh. Aswalpur has its gram panchayat by the same name as the village. The village is about 30 kilometers North-West of Varanasi city, 264 kilometers South-East of the state capital Lucknow, and 798 kilometers South-East of the national capital Delhi.

== Demography ==
Aswalpur has a total population of 2,080 people amongst 285 families. The sex ratio of Aswalpur is 957 and the child sex ratio is 831. Uttar Pradesh state average for both ratios is 912 and 902 respectively ^{[note]}.

Details	Male	Female	Total	Comments
Number of houses	-	-	285	(census 2011)
Adult	909	889	1,798	(census 2011)
Children (0–6 years)	154	128	282	(census 2011)
Total population	1,063	1,017	2,080	(census 2011)
Literacy	86.58%	57.26%	72.08%	(census 2011)

== Transportation ==
Aswalpur can be accessed by road and does not have a railway station of its own. The closest railway station to this village is Khalispur railway station (9.2 kilometers North-East). Nearest operational airports are Varanasi airport (13 kilometers South-East) and Allahabad Airports (136 kilometers West).

== See also ==
- Pindra Tehsil
- Pindra (Assembly constituency)

== Notes ==
- All demographic data is based on 2011 Census of India.
