= Aneai =

Anei
- Village
- Village location on Varanasi district map Anei (Uttar Pradesh) Anei (India)
- Coordinates: 25.450730°N 82.737024°E
- Country: India
- State: Uttar Pradesh
- District: Varanasi district
- Tehsil: Pindra
- Elevation: 88.812 m (291.38 ft)

Population (2011)
  - Total: 2,898

Languages
  - Official: Hindi
- Time zone: UTC+5:30 (IST)
- Postal code: 221201
- Telephone code: +91-542
- Vehicle registration: UP65 XXXX
- Village code: 208515
- Lok Sabha constituency: Varanasi
- Vidhan Sabha constituency: Pindra

Anei is a village in Pindra Tehsil of Varanasi district in the Indian state of Uttar Pradesh. Aneai has its own gram panchayat by the same name as the village. The village is about 38 kilometers South-East of Varanasi city, 276 kilometers South-East of state capital Lucknow and 787 kilometers South-East of the national capital Delhi.

== Demography ==
Aneai has a total population of 2,898 people amongst 394 families. Sex ratio of Aneai is 912 and child sex ratio is 876. Uttar Pradesh state average for both ratios is 912 and 902 respectively ^{[note]}.

Details	Male	Female	Total	Comments
Number of houses	-	-	394	(census 2011)
Adult	1,282	1,177	2,459	(census 2011)
Children (0–6 years)	234	205	439	(census 2011)
Total population	1,516	1,382	2,898	(census 2011)
Literacy	85.41%	65.93%	76.09%	(census 2011)

== Transportation ==
Aneai can be accessed by road and does not have a railway station of its own. Nearest operational airports are Varanasi airport (20 kilometers East) and Allahabad Airports (125 kilometers West).

== See also ==
- Pindra Tehsil
- Pindra (Assembly constituency)

== Notes ==
- All demographic data is based on 2011 Census of India.
