= Araji Hasanpur =

- Village
- Village location on Varanasi district map Araji Hasanpur (Uttar Pradesh) Araji Hasanpur (India)
- Coordinates: 25.420644°N 82.739434°E
- Country: India
- State: Uttar Pradesh
- District: Varanasi district
- Tehsil: Pindra
- Elevation: 83.490 m (273.92 ft)

Population (2011)
  - Total: 78

Languages
  - Official: Hindi
- Time zone: UTC+5:30 (IST)
- Postal code: 221201
- Telephone code: +91-5450
- Vehicle registration: UP65 XXXX
- Village code: 208547
- Lok Sabha constituency: Varanasi
- Vidhan Sabha constituency: Pindra

Araji Hasanpur is a village in Pindra Tehsil of Varanasi district in the Indian state of Uttar Pradesh. Araji Hasanpur falls under Madhomakhiya gram panchayat. The village is about 34.5 kilometers North-West of Varanasi city, 308 kilometers South-East of state capital Lucknow and 784 kilometers South-East of the national capital Delhi.

== Demography ==
Araji Hasanpur has a total population of 78 people amongst 9 families. Sex ratio of Araji Hasanpur is 1,108 and child sex ratio is 1,600. Uttar Pradesh state average for both ratios is 912 and 902 respectively ^{[note]}.

Details	Male	Female	Total	Comments
Number of houses	-	-	9	(census 2011)
Adult	32	33	65	(census 2011)
Children (0–6 years)	5	8	13	(census 2011)
Total population	37	41	78	(census 2011)
Literacy	43.75%	45.45%	44.62%	(census 2011)

== Transportation ==
Araji Hasanpur can be accessed by road and does not have a railway station of its own. Closest railway station to this village is Babatpur railway station (24.5 kilometers East). Nearest operational airports are Varanasi airport (17.6 kilometers East) and Allahabad Airports (122 kilometers West).

== See also ==
- Pindra Tehsil
- Pindra (Assembly constituency)

== Notes ==
- All demographic data is based on 2011 Census of India.
