= Akorha =

- Village
- Village location on Varanasi district map Akorha (Uttar Pradesh) Akorha (India)
- Coordinates: 25.385136°N 82.721226°E
- Country: India
- State: Uttar Pradesh
- District: Varanasi district
- Tehsil: Pindra
- Elevation: 84.936 m (278.66 ft)

Population (2011)
  - Total: 1,930

Languages
  - Official: Hindi
- Time zone: UTC+5:30 (IST)
- Postal code: 221209
- Telephone code: +91-5450
- Vehicle registration: UP65 XXXX
- Village code: 208540
- Lok Sabha constituency: Varanasi
- Vidhan Sabha constituency: Pindra
- Website: up.gov.in

Akorha is a village in Pindra Tehsil of Varanasi district in the Indian state of Uttar Pradesh. Akorha comes under the Akodha gram panchayat. The village is about 31.0 kilometers North-West of Varanasi city, 305 kilometers South-East of state capital Lucknow and 780 kilometers South-East of the national capital Delhi.

== Demography ==
Akorha has a total population of 1,930 people amongst 279 families. Sex ratio of Akorha is 1,130 and child sex ratio is 847. Uttar Pradesh state average for both ratios is 912 and 902 respectively ^{[note]}.

| Details | Male | Female | Total | Comments |
|---|---|---|---|---|
| Number of houses | - | - | 279 | (census 2011) |
| Adult | 762 | 902 | 1,664 | (census 2011) |
| Children (0–6 years) | 144 | 122 | 266 | (census 2011) |
| Total population | 906 | 1,024 | 1,930 | (census 2011) |
| Literacy | 91.47% | 70.40% | 80.05% | (census 2011) |

== Transportation ==
Akorha can be accessed by road and does not have a railway station of its own. Closest railway station to this village is Khalispur railway station (5.5 kilometers South). Nearest operational airports are Varanasi airport (22 kilometers North-East) and Allahabad Airports (118 kilometers West).

== See also ==
- Pindra Tehsil
- Pindra (Assembly constituency)

== Notes ==
- All demographic data is based on 2011 Census of India.
