= Deorai =

- Village
- Village location on Varanasi district map Deorai (Uttar Pradesh) Deorai (India)
- Coordinates: 25.497519°N 82.850600°E
- Country: India
- State: Uttar Pradesh
- Elevation: 79.969 m (262.37 ft)

Population (2011)
  - Total: 1,843

Languages
  - Official: Hindi
- Time zone: UTC+5:30 (IST)
- Postal code: 221206
- Telephone code: +91-5450
- Vehicle registration: UP65 XXXX
- Village code: 208631

Deorai is a village in Pindra Tehsil of Varanasi district in the Indian state of Uttar Pradesh. Deorai has its own gram panchayat in the same name as the village. The village is about 32 kilometers North-West of Varanasi city, 289 kilometers South-East of state capital Lucknow and 811 kilometers South-East of the national capital Delhi.

== Demography ==
Deorai has a total population of 1,843 people amongst 296 families. Sex ratio of Deorai is 1,078 and child sex ratio is 918. Uttar Pradesh state average for both ratios is 912 and 902 respectively^{[note]}.

Details	Male	Female	Total	Comments
Number of houses	-	-	296	(census 2011)
Adult	753	833	1,586	(census 2011)
Children (0–6 years)	134	123	257	(census 2011)
Total population	887	956	1,843	(census 2011)
Literacy	86.32%	58.22%	71.56%	(census 2011)

== Transportation ==
Deorai can be accessed by road and does not have a railway station of its own. Closest railway station to this village is Khalispur railway station (9.2 kilometers North). Nearest operational airports are Varanasi airport (13.0 kilometers South) and Allahabad Airports (148 kilometers West).

== Notes ==
- All demographic data is based on 2011 Census of India.
