= Azoarepur =

- Village
- Village location on Varanasi district map Azoarepur (Uttar Pradesh) Azoarepur (India)
- Coordinates: 25.452101°N 82.750222°E
- Country: India
- State: Uttar Pradesh
- District: Varanasi district
- Tehsil: Pindra
- Elevation: 84.693 m (277.86 ft)

Population (2011)
  - Total: 222

Languages
  - Official: Hindi
- Time zone: UTC+5:30 (IST)
- Postal code: 221201
- Telephone code: +91-5450
- Vehicle registration: UP65 XXXX
- Village code: 208460
- Lok Sabha constituency: Varanasi
- Vidhan Sabha constituency: Pindra

Azoarepur is a village in Pindra Tehsil of Varanasi district in the Indian state of Uttar Pradesh. The village falls under the Sarvipur gram panchayat. The village is about 39 kilometres (24.2 mi) northwest of Varanasi city, 284 kilometres (176 mi) southeast of the state capital Lucknow, and 789 kilometres (490 mi) southeast of the national capital Delhi.

== Demography ==
Azoarepur has a total population of 222 people amongst 37 families. The sex ratio of the village is 1,000, and the child sex ratio is 778. The Uttar Pradesh state average for both ratios is 912 and 902 respectively.^{[note]}

Details	Male	Female	Total	Comments
Number of houses	-	-	37	(census 2011)
Adult	93	97	190	(census 2011)
Children (0–6 years)	18	14	32	(census 2011)
Total population	111	1,11	222	(census 2011)
Literacy	83.87%	51.55%	67.37%	(census 2011)

== Transportation ==
Azoarepur can be accessed by road and does not have a railway station of its own. The closest railway station to this village is Pindra railway station (17 km [10.6 mi] northeast). The nearest operational airports are Varanasi airport (15 km [9.3 mi] east) and Allahabad Airport (128 km [80 mi] west).

== See also ==
- Pindra Tehsil
- Pindra (Assembly constituency)

== Notes ==
- All demographic data is based on 2011 Census of India.
