= Amaut =

- Village
- Village location on Varanasi district map Amaut (Uttar Pradesh) Amaut (India)
- Coordinates: 25.469636°N 82.882905°E
- Country: India
- State: Uttar Pradesh
- District: Varanasi district
- Tehsil: Pindra
- Elevation: 81.972 m (268.94 ft)

Population (2011)
  - Total: 3,896

Languages
  - Official: Hindi
- Time zone: UTC+5:30 (IST)
- Postal code: 221202
- Telephone code: +91-5450
- Vehicle registration: UP65 XXXX
- Village code: 208658
- Lok Sabha constituency: Varanasi
- Vidhan Sabha constituency: Pindra

Amaut is a village in Pindra Tehsil of Varanasi district in the Indian state of Uttar Pradesh. Amaut has its own gram panchayat by the same name as the village. The village is about 30 kilometres (19 miles) north-west of Varanasi city, 269 kilometres (167 miles) south-east of state capital Lucknow and 807 kilometres (501 miles) south-east of the national capital Delhi.

== Demography ==
Amaut has a total population of 3,896 people amongst 584 families. Sex ratio of Amaut is 965 and child sex ratio is 875. Uttar Pradesh state average for both ratios is 912 and 902 respectively ^{[note]}.

Details	Male	Female	Total	Comments
Number of houses	-	-	584	(census 2011)
Adult	1,687	1,654	3,341	(census 2011)
Children (0–6 years)	296	259	555	(census 2011)
Total population	1,983	1,913	3,896	(census 2011)
Literacy	89.03%	65.42%	77.34%	(census 2011)

== Transportation ==
Amaut can be accessed by road and does not have a railway station of its own. The closest railway station to this village is Babatpur railway station (1.7 kilometres (1.1 miles) north-east). The nearest operational airports are Varanasi airport (6 kilometres (3.7 miles) south-west) and Allahabad Airport (146 kilometres (91 miles) west).

== See also ==
- Pindra Tehsil
- Pindra (Assembly constituency)

== Notes ==
- All demographic data is based on 2011 Census of India.
