= Amawar =

- Village
- Village location on Varanasi district map Amawar (Uttar Pradesh) Amawar (India)
- Coordinates: 25.396142°N 82.916539°E
- Country: India
- State: Uttar Pradesh
- District: Varanasi district
- Tehsil: Pindra
- Elevation: 81.241 m (266.54 ft)

Population (2011)
  - Total: 444

Languages
  - Official: Hindi
- Time zone: UTC+5:30 (IST)
- Postal code: 221205
- Telephone code: +91-542
- Vehicle registration: UP65 XXXX
- Village code: 208791
- Lok Sabha constituency: Varanasi
- Vidhan Sabha constituency: Pindra

Amawar is a village in Pindra Tehsil of Varanasi district in the Indian state of Uttar Pradesh. Amawar falls under Mohanpur gram panchayat. The village is about 15 kilometers North-West of Varanasi city, 277 kilometers South-East of state capital Lucknow and 802 kilometers South-East of the national capital Delhi.

== Demography ==
Amawar has a total population of 444 people amongst 70 families. Sex ratio of Amawar is 922 and child sex ratio is 600. Uttar Pradesh state average for both ratios is 912 and 902 respectively ^{[note]}.

Details	Male	Female	Total	Comments
Number of houses	-	-	70	(census 2011)
Adult	206	198	404	(census 2011)
Children (0–6 years)	25	15	40	(census 2011)
Total population	231	213	444	(census 2011)
Literacy	92.72%	68.69%	80.94%	(census 2011)

== Transportation ==
Amawar can be accessed by road and does not have a railway station of its own. Closest railway station to this village is Birapatti railway station (1.2 kilometers North). Nearest operational airports are Varanasi airport (12 kilometers North-West) and Allahabad Airports (141 kilometers West).

== See also ==
- Pindra Tehsil
- Pindra (Assembly constituency)

== Notes ==
- All demographic data is based on 2011 Census of India.
