= Aharak =

- Village
- Village location on Varanasi district map Aharak (Uttar Pradesh) Aharak (India)
- Coordinates: 25.423027°N 82.893669°E
- Country: India
- State: Uttar Pradesh
- District: Varanasi district
- Tehsil: Pindra
- Elevation: 84.638 m (277.68 ft)

Population (2011)
  - Total: 1,152

Languages
  - Official: Hindi
- Time zone: UTC+5:30 (IST)
- Postal code: 221202
- Telephone code: +91-5450
- Vehicle registration: UP65 XXXX
- Village code: 208706
- Lok Sabha constituency: Varanasi
- Vidhan Sabha constituency: Pindra

Aharak is a village in Pindra Tehsil of Varanasi district in the Indian state of Uttar Pradesh. Aharak has its own gram panchayat by the same name as the village. The village is about 19 kilometers North-West of Varanasi city, 274 kilometers South-East of state capital Lucknow and 805 kilometers South-East of the national capital Delhi the village is well connected by different link road to the National Highway 31.

== Demography ==
Aharak has a total population of 1,152 people amongst 139 families. Sex ratio of Aharak is 949 and child sex ratio is 1,000. Uttar Pradesh state average for both ratios is 912 and 902 respectively^{[note]}.

Details	Male	Female	Total	Comments
Number of houses	-	-	139	(census 2011)
Adult	502	472	974	(census 2011)
Children (0–6 years)	89	89	178	(census 2011)
Total population	591	561	1,152	(census 2011)
Literacy	85.26%	62.29%	74.13%	(census 2011)

== Transportation ==
Aharak can be accessed by road and does not have a railway station of its own. Closest railway station to this village is Birapatti railway station (6.2 kilometers South-East). Nearest operational airports are Varanasi airport (6.7 kilometers North-West) and Allahabad Airports (143 kilometers West).

== See also ==
- Pindra Tehsil
- Varanasi district

== Notes ==
- All demographic data is based on 2011 Census of India.
