= Ajaipur =

- Village
- Village location on Varanasi district map Ajaipur (Uttar Pradesh) Ajaipur (India)
- Coordinates: 25.504837°N 82.808445°E
- Country: India
- State: Uttar Pradesh
- District: Varanasi district
- Tehsil: Pindra
- Elevation: 82 m (269 ft)

Population (2011)
  - Total: 1,380

Languages
  - Official: Hindi
- Time zone: UTC+5:30 (IST)
- Postal code: 221206
- Telephone code: +91-5450
- Vehicle registration: UP65 XXXX
- Village code: 208648
- Lok Sabha constituency: Varanasi
- Vidhan Sabha constituency: Pindra

Ajaipur is a village in Pindra Tehsil of Varanasi district in the Indian state of Uttar Pradesh. Ajaipur has its own gram panchayat by the same name as the village. The village is about 31.0 kilometers North-West of Varanasi city, 263 kilometers South-East of state capital Lucknow and 800 kilometers South-East of the national capital Delhi.

== Demography ==
Ajaipur has a total population of 1,380 people amongst 220 families. Sex ratio of Ajaipur is 1,035 and child sex ratio is 1,220. Uttar Pradesh state average for both ratios is 912 and 902 respectively.^{[note]}

Details	Male	Female	Total	Comments
Number of houses	-	-	220	(census 2011)
Adult	587	591	1,178	(census 2011)
Children (0–6 years)	91	111	202	(census 2011)
Total population	678	702	1,380	(census 2011)
Literacy	76.15%	55.84%	65.96%	(census 2011)

== Transportation ==
Ajaipur can be accessed by road and does not have a railway station of its own. Closest railway station to this village is Khalispur railway station (8 kilometers North-East). Nearest operational airports are Varanasi airport (14 kilometers South-East) and Allahabad Airports (137 kilometers West).

== See also ==
- Pindra (Assembly constituency)

== Notes ==
- All demographic data is based on 2011 Census of India.
