= Gang Khurd =

Gaag Khurd
- Village
- Village location on Varanasi district map Gaag Khurd (Uttar Pradesh) Gaag Khurd (India)
- Coordinates: 25.428244°N 82.804135°E
- Country: India
- State: Uttar Pradesh
- District: Varanasi district
- Tehsil: Pindra
- Elevation: 82.888 m (271.94 ft)

Population (2011)
  - Total: 517

Languages
  - Official: Hindi
- Time zone: UTC+5:30 (IST)
- Postal code: 221206
- Telephone code: +91-542
- Vehicle registration: UP65 XXXX
- Village code: 208495
- Lok Sabha constituency: Varanasi
- Vidhan Sabha constituency: Pindra

Gaag Khurd is a village in Pindra Tehsil of Varanasi district in the Indian state of Uttar Pradesh. Only one shia Muslim Village between Varanasi and Jaunpur District. The village comes under Gangkala gram panchayat. The village is about 27 kilometers North-West of Varanasi city, 266 kilometers South-East of state capital Lucknow and 791 kilometers South-East of the national capital Delhi.

== Demography ==
Gang Khurd has a total population of 517 people amongst 48 families. Sex ratio of Gaag Khurd is 1,093 and child sex ratio is 1,132. Uttar Pradesh state average for both ratios is 912 and 902 respectively ^{[note]}.

Details	Male	Female	Total	Comments
Number of houses	-	-	48	(census 2011)
Adult	209	227	436	(census 2011)
Children (0–6 years)	38	43	81	(census 2011)
Total population	247	270	517	(census 2011)
Literacy	84.69%	68.72%	76.38%	(census 2011)

== Transportation ==
Gang Khurd can be accessed by road and does not have a railway station of its own. Closest railway station to this village is Babatpur Railway Station (14 kilometres North-East). Nearest operational airports are Varanasi airport (9 kilometres North-East) and Allahabad Airports (130 kilometres West).

== See also ==
- Pindra Tehsil
- Pindra (Assembly constituency)

== Notes ==
- All demographic data is based on 2011 Census of India.
