= Ashwari =

- Village
- Village location on Varanasi district map Ashwari (Uttar Pradesh) Ashwari (India)
- Coordinates: 25.465382°N 82.765727°E
- Country: India
- State: Uttar Pradesh
- District: Varanasi district
- Tehsil: Pindra
- Elevation: 83.352 m (273.46 ft)

Population (2011)
  - Total: 1,372

Languages
  - Official: Hindi
- Time zone: UTC+5:30 (IST)
- Postal code: 221206
- Telephone code: +91-5450
- Vehicle registration: UP65 XXXX
- Village code: 208470
- Lok Sabha constituency: Varanasi
- Vidhan Sabha constituency: Pindra

Ashwari is a village in Pindra Tehsil of Varanasi district in the Indian state of Uttar Pradesh. Ashwari has its own gram panchayat by the same name as the village. The village is about 42.0 kilometers North-West of Varanasi city, 273 kilometers South-East of state capital Lucknow and 791 kilometers South-East of the national capital Delhi.

== Demography ==
Ashwari has a total population of 1,372 people amongst 215 families. Sex ratio of Ashwari is 1,030 and child sex ratio is 1,132. Uttar Pradesh state average for both ratios is 912 and 902 respectively ^{[note]}.

Details	Male	Female	Total	Comments
Number of houses	-	-	215	(census 2011)
Adult	585	593	1,178	(census 2011)
Children (0–6 years)	91	103	194	(census 2011)
Total population	676	696	1,372	(census 2011)
Literacy	84.62%	54.97%	69.69%	(census 2011)

== Transportation ==
Ashwari can be accessed by road and does not have a railway station of its own. Closest railway station to this village is Babatpur railway station (17 kilometers East). Nearest operational airports are Varanasi airport (16.5 kilometers East) and Allahabad Airports (129 kilometers West).

== See also ==
- Pindra Tehsil
- Pindra (Assembly constituency)

== Notes ==
- All demographic data is based on 2011 Census of India.
