= Ausanpur =

- Village
- Village location on Varanasi district map Ausanpur (Uttar Pradesh) Ausanpur (India)
- Coordinates: 25.380739°N 82.872138°E
- Country: India
- State: Uttar Pradesh
- District: Varanasi district
- Tehsil: Pindra
- Elevation: 82.267 m (269.90 ft)

Population (2011)
  - Total: 3,077

Languages
  - Official: Hindi
- Time zone: UTC+5:30 (IST)
- Postal code: 221105
- Telephone code: +91-542
- Vehicle registration: UP65 XXXX
- Village code: 208818
- Post Office: Harahua
- Lok Sabha constituency: Varanasi
- Vidhan Sabha constituency: Pindra

Ausanpur is a village in Pindra Tehsil of Varanasi district in the Indian state of Uttar Pradesh. The village has gram panchayat by the same name as the village. The village is about 16 kilometers North-West of Varanasi city, 320 kilometers South-East of state capital Lucknow and 796 kilometers South-East of the national capital Delhi. The village is situated on the banks of River Varuna. The famous Panchkoshi Road lies on the North side of the village.

== Demography ==
Ausanpur has a total population of 3,077 people amongst 478 families. Sex ratio of Ausanpur is 950 and child sex ratio is 980. Uttar Pradesh state average for both ratios is 912 and 902 respectively ^{[note]}.

Details	Male	Female	Total	Comments
Number of houses	-	-	478	(census 2011)
Adult	1,134	1,260	2,594	(census 2011)
Children (0–6 years)	244	239	483	(census 2011)
Total population	1,578	1,499	3,077	(census 2011)
Literacy	84.71%	65.08%	75.17%	(census 2011)

== Transportation ==
Ausanpur can be accessed by road and does not have a railway station of its own. The closest railway station to Ausanpur is the Varanasi Railway Station, 17 kilometres South-East. The nearest operational airports are Varanasi airport (12 kilometres North) and Allahabad Airports (135 kilometres West).

== See also ==
- Pindra Tehsil
- Pindra (Assembly constituency)

== Notes ==
- All demographic data is based on 2011 Census of India.
