= Babatpur =

- Village
- Village location on Varanasi district map Babatpur (Uttar Pradesh) Babatpur (India)
- Coordinates: 25.453544°N 82.879143°E
- Country: India
- State: Uttar Pradesh
- District: Varanasi district
- Tehsil: Pindra
- Elevation: 83.012 m (272.35 ft)

Population (2011)
  - Total: 2,293

Languages
  - Official: Hindi
- Time zone: UTC+5:30 (IST)
- Postal code: 221206
- Telephone code: +91-542
- Vehicle registration: UP65 XXXX
- Village code: 208723
- Lok Sabha constituency: Varanasi
- Vidhan Sabha constituency: Pindra

Babatpur is a village, near Varanasi city in Pindra Tehsil of Varanasi district in the Indian state of Uttar Pradesh. The village falls under gram panchayat by the same name as the village. The village also houses Lal Bahadur Shastri Airport (a.k.a. Babatpur Airport) which serves Varanasi district. The village is about 26 kilometers North-West of Varanasi city, 260 kilometers South-East of state capital Lucknow and 797 kilometers South-East of the national capital New Delhi.

== Demography ==
Babatpur has a total population of 2,293 people amongst 339 families. Sex ratio of the village is 897 and child sex ratio is 811. Uttar Pradesh state average for both ratios is 912 and 902 respectively.^{[note]}

Details	Male	Female	Total	Comments
Number of houses	-	-	339	(census 2011)
Adult	1,003	921	1,924	(census 2011)
Children (0–6 years)	206	167	373	(census 2011)
Total population	1,209	1,084	2,297	(census 2011)
Literacy	87.94%	66.30%	77.60%	(census 2011)

== Transportation ==
Babatpur can be accessed by air (Lal Bahadur Shastri Airport), train (Babatpur railway station) and by road. Nearest operational airports are Varanasi airport (0.5 kilometer) and Allahabad Airports (137 kilometres West).

== See also ==
- Pindra Tehsil
- Pindra (Assembly constituency)

== Notes ==
- All demographic data is based on 2011 Census of India.
