= Murdi, Pindra =

Murdi
- Village
- Village location on Varanasi district map Murdi (Uttar Pradesh) Murdi (India)
- Coordinates: 25.482221°N 82.929988°E
- Country: India
- State: Uttar Pradesh
- District: Varanasi district
- Tehsil: Pindra
- Elevation: 79.448 m (260.66 ft)

Population (2011)
  - Total: 1,374

Languages
  - Official: Hindi
- Time zone: UTC+5:30 (IST)
- Postal code: 221208
- Telephone code: +91-5450
- Vehicle registration: UP65 XXXX
- Village code: 208670
- Lok Sabha constituency: Varanasi
- Vidhan Sabha constituency: Pindra

Murdi is a village in Pindra Tehsil of Varanasi district in the Indian state of Uttar Pradesh. Murdi has its own gram panchayat by the same name as the village. The village is about 23 kilometers north-west of Varanasi city, 314 kilometers south-east of state capital Lucknow and 809 kilometers south-east of the national capital Delhi.

== Demography ==
Murdi has a total population of 1,374 people amongst 203 families. Sex ratio of this village is 1,006 and child sex ratio is 894. Uttar Pradesh state average for both ratios is 912 and 902 respectively ^{[note]}.

Details	Male	Female	Total	Comments
Number of houses	-	-	203	(census 2011)
Adult	591	605	1,196	(census 2011)
Children (0–6 years)	94	84	178	(census 2011)
Total population	685	689	1,374	(census 2011)
Literacy	85.45%	65.79%	75.50%	(census 2011)

== Transportation ==
Murdi can be accessed by road and does not have a railway station of its own. Closest railway station to this village is Khalispur Railway Station (19 kilometers north-west). Nearest operational airports are Varanasi airport (11 kilometers south-west) and Allahabad Airports (149 kilometers west).

== See also ==
- Pindra Tehsil
- Pindra (Assembly constituency)

== Notes ==
- All demographic data is based on 2011 Census of India.
