= Amilo, Varanasi =

Amilo
- Village
- Village location on Varanasi district map Amilo (Uttar Pradesh) Amilo (India)
- Coordinates: 25.434252°N 82.724261°E
- Country: India
- State: Uttar Pradesh
- District: Varanasi district
- Tehsil: Pindra
- Elevation: 85.689 m (281.13 ft)

Population (2011)
  - Total: 135

Languages
  - Official: Hindi
- Time zone: UTC+5:30 (IST)
- Postal code: 221403
- Telephone code: +91-542
- Vehicle registration: UP65 XXXX
- Village code: 208523
- Lok Sabha constituency: Varanasi
- Vidhan Sabha constituency: Pindra

Amilo is a village in Pindra Tehsil of Varanasi district in the Indian state of Uttar Pradesh. Amilo falls under Dhananjaypur gram panchayat. The village is about 37 kilometers North-West of Varanasi city, 279 kilometers South-East of state capital Lucknow and 786 kilometers South-East of the national capital Delhi.

== Demography ==
Amilo has a total population of 135 people amongst 16 families. Sex ratio of Amilo is 1,500 and child sex ratio is 3,167. Uttar Pradesh state average for both ratios is 912 and 902 respectively ^{[note]}.

Details	Male	Female	Total	Comments
Number of houses	-	-	16	(census 2011)
Adult	48	62	110	(census 2011)
Children (0–6 years)	6	19	25	(census 2011)
Total population	54	81	135	(census 2011)
Literacy	87.50%	66.13%	75.45%	(census 2011)

== Transportation ==
Amilo can be accessed by road but does not have a railway station of its own. Nearest operational airports are Varanasi airport (24 kilometers East) and Allahabad Airports (124 kilometers West).

== See also ==
- Pindra Tehsil
- Pindra (Assembly constituency)

== Notes ==
- All demographic data is based on 2011 Census of India.
