= Ahiran, Pindra =

Ahiran
- Village
- Village location on Varanasi district map Ahiran (Uttar Pradesh) Ahiran (India)
- Coordinates: 25.352719°N 82.932677°E
- Country: India
- State: Uttar Pradesh
- District: Varanasi district
- Tehsil: Pindra
- Elevation: 78.662 m (258.08 ft)

Population (2011)
  - Total: 2,115

Languages
  - Official: Hindi
- Time zone: UTC+5:30 (IST)
- Postal code: 221204
- Telephone code: +91-5450
- Vehicle registration: UP65 XXXX
- Village code: 208848
- Lok Sabha constituency: Varanasi
- Vidhan Sabha constituency: Pindra

Ahiran is a village in Pindra Tehsil of Varanasi district in the Indian state of Uttar Pradesh. Ahiran falls under Nathaiya Pur gram panchayat. The village is about 10.6 kilometers North-West of Varanasi city, 282 kilometers South-East of state capital Lucknow and 805 kilometers South-East of the national capital Delhi.

== Demography ==
Ahiran has a total population of 2,115 people amongst 293 families. Sex ratio of Ahiran is 852 and child sex ratio is 775. Uttar Pradesh state average for both ratios is 912 and 902 respectively ^{[note]}.

Details	Male	Female	Total	Comments
Number of houses	-	-	293	(census 2011)
Adult	942	818	1,760	(census 2011)
Children (0–6 years)	200	155	355	(census 2011)
Total population	1,142	973	2,115	(census 2011)
Literacy	74.10%	49.76%	62.78%	(census 2011)

== Transportation ==
Ahiran can be accessed by road and does not have a railway station of its own. Closest railway station to this village is Shivpur railway station (2.3 kilometers North-East). Nearest operational airports are Varanasi airport (17 kilometers North-West) and Allahabad Airports (143 kilometers West).

== See also ==
- Pindra Tehsil
- Pindra (Assembly constituency)

== Notes ==
- All demographic data is based on 2011 Census of India.
