= Ahirani, Pindra =

Ahirani
- Village
- Village location on Varanasi district map Ahirani (Uttar Pradesh) Ahirani (India)
- Coordinates: 25.475278°N 82.787292°E
- Country: India
- State: Uttar Pradesh
- District: Varanasi district
- Tehsil: Pindra
- Elevation: 80.795 m (265.08 ft)

Population (2011)
  - Total: 923

Languages
  - Official: Hindi
- Time zone: UTC+5:30 (IST)
- Postal code: 221204
- Telephone code: +91-542
- Vehicle registration: UP65 XXXX
- Village code: 208466
- Lok Sabha constituency: Varanasi
- Vidhan Sabha constituency: Pindra

Ahirani is a village in Pindra Tehsil of Varanasi district in the Indian state of Uttar Pradesh. Ahirani falls under Nathaiya Pur gram panchayat. The village is about 31.0 kilometers North-West of Varanasi city, 272 kilometers South-East of state capital Lucknow and 794 kilometers South-East of the national capital Delhi.

== Demography ==
Ahirani has a total population of 923 people amongst 137 families. Sex ratio of Ahirani is 956 and child sex ratio is 1,098. Uttar Pradesh state average for both ratios is 912 and 902 respectively ^{[note]}.

Details	Male	Female	Total	Comments
Number of houses	-	-	137	(census 2011)
Adult	411	384	795	(census 2011)
Children (0–6 years)	61	67	128	(census 2011)
Total population	472	451	923	(census 2011)
Literacy	73.72%	51.82%	63.14%	(census 2011)

== Transportation ==
Ahirani can be accessed by road and does not have a railway station of its own. Closest railway station to this village is Kapseti railway station (19 kilometers South-West). Nearest operational airports are Varanasi airport (13 kilometers South-East) and Allahabad Airports (132 kilometers West).

== See also ==
- Pindra Tehsil
- Pindra (Assembly constituency)

== Notes ==
- All demographic data is based on 2011 Census of India.
