= Eshipur =

- Village
- Village location on Varanasi district map Eshipur (Uttar Pradesh) Eshipur (India)
- Coordinates: 25.401952°N 82.817806°E
- Country: India
- State: Uttar Pradesh
- Elevation: 84.084 m (275.87 ft)

Population (2011)
  - Total: 1,102

Languages
  - Official: Hindi
- Time zone: UTC+5:30 (IST)
- Postal code: 221206
- Telephone code: +91-5450
- Vehicle registration: UP65 XXXX
- Village code: 208499

Eshipur is a village in Pindra Tehsil of Varanasi district in the Indian state of Uttar Pradesh. Eshipur has its own gram panchayat in the same name as the village. The village is about 27 kilometers North-West of Varanasi city, 284 kilometers South-East of state capital Lucknow and 802 kilometers South-East of the national capital Delhi.

== Demography ==
Eshipur has a total population of 1,102 people amongst 196 families. Sex ratio of Eshipur is 1,115 and child sex ratio is 1,104. Uttar Pradesh state average for both ratios is 912 and 902 respectively^{[note]}.

Details	Male	Female	Total	Comments
Number of houses	-	-	196	(census 2011)
Adult	454	507	961	(census 2011)
Children (0–6 years)	67	74	141	(census 2011)
Total population	521	581	1,102	(census 2011)
Literacy	92.07%	71.99%	81.48%	(census 2011)

== Transportation ==
Eshipur can be accessed by road and does not have a railway station of its own. Closest railway station to this village is Pindra railway station (17.5 kilometers North-East). Nearest operational airports are Varanasi airport (12.0 kilometers North-East) and Allahabad Airports (140 kilometers West).

== Notes ==
- All demographic data is based on 2011 Census of India.
