= Aitha =

- Village
- Village location on Varanasi district map Aitha (Uttar Pradesh) Aitha (India)
- Coordinates: 25.386964°N 82.979855°E
- Country: India
- State: Uttar Pradesh
- Elevation: 80 m (260 ft)

Population (2011)
  - Total: 2,398

Languages
  - Official: Hindi
- Time zone: UTC+5:30 (IST)
- PIN: 221003
- STD: 0542
- Vehicle registration: UP65 XXXX
- Village code: 209594
- Website: up.gov.in

Aitha is a village in Varanasi district in the Indian state of Uttar Pradesh. It is about 312 kilometers from the state capital Lucknow and 806 kilometers from the national capital Delhi.

== Demography ==
Aitha has a total population of 2,398 people amongst 354 families. Sex ratio of Aitha is 884 and child sex ratio is 917. Uttar Pradesh state average for both ratios is 912 and 902 respectively^{[note]}.

Details	Male	Female	Total	Comments
Number of houses	-	-	354	(census 2011)
Adult	1,104	970	2,074	(census 2011)
Children (0–6 years)	169	155	324	(census 2011)
Total population	1,273	1,125	2,398	(census 2011)
Literacy	85.14%	67.01%	76.66%	(census 2011)

== Transportation ==
Aitha can be accessed by road only as it does not have a railway station. Closest railway station to this village is Sarnath (8 km). Nearest operational airports are Varanasi airport (18 kilometers) and Allahabad Airports (143 kilometers).

== Notes ==
- All demographic data is based on 2011 Census of India.
