= Ashapur =

- Village
- Village location on Varanasi district map Ashapur (Uttar Pradesh) Ashapur (India)
- Coordinates: 25.381413°N 82.924272°E
- Country: India
- State: Uttar Pradesh
- District: Varanasi district
- Tehsil: Pindra
- Elevation: 77.437 m (254.06 ft)

Population (2011)
  - Total: 316

Languages
  - Official: Hindi
- Time zone: UTC+5:30 (IST)
- Postal code: 221105
- Telephone code: +91-542
- Vehicle registration: UP65 XXXX
- Village code: 208830
- Lok Sabha constituency: Varanasi
- Vidhan Sabha constituency: Pindra
- Website: up.gov.in

Ashapur is a village in Pindra Tehsil of Varanasi district in the Indian state of Uttar Pradesh. Ashapur falls under Bagwanpur gram panchayat. The village is about 17 kilometres North of Varanasi district and 298 kilometres south-east of state capital Lucknow.

== Demography ==
Ashapur has a total population of 316 people amongst 53 families. Sex ratio of Ashapur is 848 and child sex ratio is 615. Uttar Pradesh state average for both ratios is 912 and 902 respectively ^{[note]}.

Details	Male	Female	Total	Comments
Number of houses	–	–	53	(census 2011)
RWA	1			(census 2011)
Post office	1			(census 2011)
Total population	171	145	316	(census 2011)
Police station	1			(census 2011)

== See also ==
- Pindra Tehsil
- Pindra (Assembly constituency)

== Notes ==
- All demographic data is based on 2011 Census of India.
