= Akhari =

- Village
- Village location on Varanasi district map Akhari (Uttar Pradesh) Akhari (India)
- Coordinates: 25.243157°N 82.952844°E
- Country: India
- State: Uttar Pradesh
- City: Varanasi
- Elevation: 85 m (279 ft)

Population (2011)
  - Total: 4,105

Languages
  - Official: Hindi
- Time zone: UTC+5:30 (IST)
- PIN: 221011
- STD: 0542
- Vehicle registration: UP65 XXXX
- Village code: 209521
- Website: up.gov.in

Akhari is an area in Varanasi in the Indian state of Uttar Pradesh. It is about 332 kilometers from the state capital Lucknow and 792 kilometers from the national capital Delhi.

== Demography ==
Akhari has a total population of 4,105 people amongst 670 families. Sex ratio of Akhari is 914 and child sex ratio is 805. Uttar Pradesh state average for both ratios is 912 and 902 respectively.

Details	Male	Female	Total
Number of houses	-	-	670
Adult	1,842	1,716	3,558
Children (0–6 years)	303	244	547
Total population	2,145	1,960	4,105
Literacy	87.19%	69.00%	78.14%

== Transportation ==
Akhari can be accessed by road and by Indian Railways. Closest railway station to Akhari is Bhulanpur (5 km). Nearest operational airports are Varanasi airport (37 kilometers) and Allahabad Airports (131 kilometres).
