= Aily =

- Village
- Village location on Varanasi district map Aily (Uttar Pradesh) Aily (India)
- Coordinates: 25.433563°N 83.021367°E
- Country: India
- State: Uttar Pradesh
- Elevation: 85 m (279 ft)

Population (2011)
  - Total: 1,693

Languages
  - Official: Hindi
- Time zone: UTC+5:30 (IST)
- PIN: 221104
- STD: 0542
- Vehicle registration: UP65 XXXX
- Village code: 209594
- Website: up.gov.in

Aily is a village in Varanasi district in the Indian state of Uttar Pradesh. It is about 316 kilometres (196 miles) from the state capital Lucknow and 812 kilometres (505 miles) from the national capital Delhi.

== Demography ==
Aily has a total population of 1,693 people amongst 285 families. The sex ratio of Akhari is 950 and the child sex ratio is 827. Uttar Pradesh's state average for both ratios is 912 and 902 respectively.

Details	Male	Female	Total	Notes
Number of houses	-	-	285	(census 2011)
Adult	729	710	1,439	(census 2011)
Children (0–6 years)	139	115	254	(census 2011)
Total population	868	825	1,693	(census 2011)
Literacy	87.65%	55.13%	74.57%	(census 2011)

== Transportation ==
Aily can be accessed by road and by Indian Railways. The closest railway station to this place is Sarnath, which is 9 kilometres (5.6 miles) away. Nearest operational airports are Varanasi airport, which is 23 kilometres (14 miles) away and Allahabad Airports, which is even further and lies 149 kilometres (93 miles) away.
