= Murdi =

Murdi (Persian: موردي) may refer to:

- Murdi, Bushehr
- Murdi, East Azerbaijan
- Murdi, Fars
- Murdi, Kohgiluyeh and Boyer-Ahmad
- Murdi: Village in Pindra tehsil, India.
