= Barzi =

Village in Uttar Pradesh, India

Barzi is a village in Baragaon block of Varanasi district, Uttar Pradesh, India.

In the 2011 census Barzi was shown as having a population of 4,713 people in 698 households.
