= Araji Line =

- Village
- Village location on Varanasi district map Araji Line (Uttar Pradesh) Araji Line (India)
- Coordinates: 25.186298°N 82.888960°E
- Country: India
- State: Uttar Pradesh
- Elevation: 87 m (285 ft)

Population (2011)
  - Total: 363

Languages
  - Official: Hindi & Urdu
- Time zone: UTC+5:30 (IST)
- STD: 05443
- Vehicle registration: UP65 XXXX
- Website: up.gov.in

Araji Line (a.k.a. Arajiline & Arazeeline) is a village in Varanasi district in the Indian state of Uttar Pradesh. It is about 275 kilometers from the state capital Lucknow and 798 kilometers from the national capital Delhi.

== Transportation ==
Araji Line can be accessed by road as it does not have a train station. Closest Indian railway stations are Manduadih & Varanasi railway stations. Nearest operational airports are Varanasi airport (46 kilometres (29 mi)) and Patna airport (258 kilometres (160 mi)).

== See also ==
- Varanasi
