= Amilo =

Amilo may refer to:

- Amilo, Azamgarh, a census town in Azamgarh district, Uttar Pradesh, India
- Amilo, Varanasi, a village in Varanasi district, Uttar Pradesh, India
- Amilo, a notebook computer manufactured by Fujitsu Siemens Computers

== See also ==
- Amilos, a settlement in ancient Arcadia, Greece
