= Vyaspur =

- Village
- Village location on Varanasi district map Vyaspur (Uttar Pradesh) Vyaspur (India)
- Coordinates: 25.396021°N 83.037480°E
- Country: India
- State: Uttar Pradesh

Population (2011)
  - Total: 536

Languages
  - Official: Hindi & Urdu
- Time zone: UTC+5:30 (IST)
- PIN: 221007
- STD: 0542
- Vehicle registration: UP65 XXXX
- Website: up.gov.in

Vyaspur is a village in Chiraigaon block of Varanasi district in the Indian state of Uttar Pradesh. It is about 219 kilometers from the state capital Lucknow and 809 kilometers from the national capital Delhi.

== Transportation ==
Vyaspur can be accessed by road and by Indian Railways. Closest railway station is Sarnath. Closest operational airports are Varanasi airport (29 kilometers) and Patna airport (244 kilometers).
