= Mehdiganj =

Village in Uttar Pradesh, India

Mehdiganj is a village in Varanasi tehsil, Varanasi district, in Uttar Pradesh, India.

== Water problems ==
Mehdiganj has experienced a lack of water due to a lowered water table since about 2001. In 1999 a Coca-Cola bottling plant opened in Mehdiganj, and within a few years this factory has taken some or all of the blame from local people for causing the lack of water. There have been numerous protests by local people against this bottling plant.
