= Kolasla Assembly constituency =

Former constituency of the Uttar Pradesh legislative assembly in India

Coordinates: 25.41°N 82.80°E

Kolasla
- Former constituency for the Uttar Pradesh Legislative Assembly

Constituency details
- Country: India
- Region: North India
- State: Uttar Pradesh
- District: Varanasi
- Established: 1952
- Abolished: 2012

Kolasla was one of the 425 Vidhan Sabha (Legislative Assembly) constituencies of Uttar Pradesh state in central India. It was a part of the Varanasi district and one of the assembly constituencies in the Varanasi Lok Sabha constituency. Kolasla Assembly constituency came into existence in 1962 and ceased to exist in 2012 as a result of "Delimitation of Parliamentary and Assembly Constituencies Order, 2008".

== Member of Legislative Assembly ==
- 1952: Sri Devmurti Sharma, Congress
- 1962: Udal, Communist Party of India
- 1967: Udal, Communist Party of India (Marxist)
- 1969: Amar Nath Dubey, Indian National Congress
- 1974: Udal, Communist Party of India (Marxist)
- 1977: Udal, Communist Party of India (Marxist)
- 1980: Udal, Communist Party of India (Marxist)
- 1985: Ramkaran Patel, Indian National Congress
- 1989: Udal, Communist Party of India (Marxist)
- 1991: Udal, Communist Party of India (Marxist)
- 1993: Udal, Communist Party of India (Marxist)
- 1996: Ajay Rai, Bharatiya Janata Party
- 2002: Ajay Rai, Bharatiya Janata Party
- 2007: Ajay Rai, Bharatiya Janata Party Ajay Rai,
- 2009 (By Polls): Ajay Rai, Independent

== See also ==
- Varanasi
- Varanasi (Lok Sabha constituency)
