= Ahirani =

Ahirani may refer to these languages in India associated with the Ahirs:

- Ahirwati or Ahirani, a Western Indo-Aryan language of India in the Rajasthani language group, spoken in the Ahirwat region of Haryana
- Ahirani, a dialect of Khandeshi language, a Southern Indo-Aryan language spoken in the Khandesh region of north-west Maharashtra
- Ahirani, Pindra, a village in Pindra Tehsil of Varanasi district in the Indian state of Uttar Pradesh
