= Janakpatti =

Village in Uttar Pradesh, India

Coordinates: 25°29′N 82°45′E

Janakpatti is a village in Pindra tehsil, Varanasi district, Uttar Pradesh, India. The village has population of about 450 and is located close to the Varanasi–Jaunpur border.
