= Ajay Rai =

Indian politician

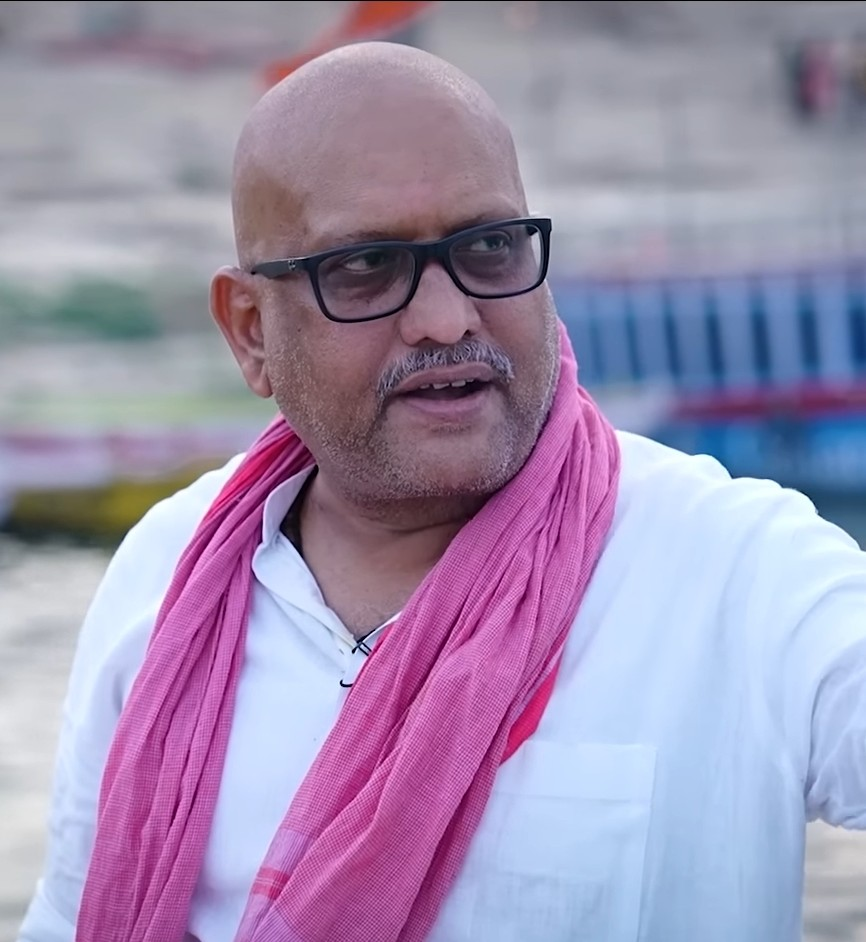
- Rai in 2024

President Uttar Pradesh Congress Committee
- In office 17 August 2023 – 2 October 2026
- Preceded by: Brijlal Khabri
- Succeeded by: Aradhana Mishra

Member of Uttar Pradesh Legislative Assembly
- In office 2012–2017
- Preceded by: constituency established
- Succeeded by: Avadhesh Singh
- Constituency: Pindra
- In office 1996–2011
- Preceded by: Udal
- Succeeded by: constituency dissolved
- Constituency: Kolasla

Personal details
- Born: 7 October 1969 (age 56) Varanasi, Uttar Pradesh, India
- Party: Indian National Congress (2012–present)
- Other political affiliations: Bharatiya Janata Party (1996–2009); Samajwadi Party (2009-2012)
- Spouse: Reena Rai
- Education: Mahatma Gandhi Kashi Vidyapeeth

Ajay Rai (born 7 October 1969) is an Indian politician and a member of the Indian National Congress since 2012. He is a five-time MLA from Uttar Pradesh and the 12th Uttar Pradesh Congress chief.

A local strongman politician in the Varanasi area, Rai has changed his party affiliations several times. He began his political career as a member of the Bharatiya Janata Party's student wing. He won the Legislative Assembly elections from the Kolasla constituency three times in a row between 1996 and 2007 on a BJP ticket. He left the party after being denied a Lok Sabha ticket. He then joined the Samajwadi Party and unsuccessfully contested the 2009 Lok Sabha elections. Subsequently, he won the 2009 Legislative Assembly by-election from the Kolasla constituency as an independent. He joined the Indian National Congress in 2012. After the Kolasla constituency ceased to exist post-delimitation, he won the 2012 Assembly elections from the newly created Pindra constituency, which comprises a sizeable portion of the former Kolasla constituency.

He was the Congress candidate for the Varanasi parliament seat in the 2014, 2019, and 2024 general elections, and lost to Narendra Modi.

== Early life and education ==
Ajay Rai was born in Varanasi to Parvati Devi Rai and Surendra Rai in a family who were natives of Ghazipur district. He graduated from the Mahatma Gandhi Kashi Vidyapith University in 1989.

== Political career ==
=== Bharatiya Janata Party (BJP) ===
Rai began his political career as a member of the BJP's youth wing. According to The Indian Express, he was known as a local bahubali (strongman) and is a history-sheeter.

He became an associate of Brijesh Singh, after his elder brother Awadhesh Rai was shot dead in Lahurabir area, allegedly by Mukhtar Ansari and his men in 1994. Earlier, he had been associated with Brijesh Singh and Tribhuvan Singh since 1989.

In 1991, his name had figured in an attack on Anil Singh, the deputy mayor of Varanasi. In his FIR, Anil Singh stated that Ajay Rai and others had fired at his jeep in the Cantonment area on 20 August 1991. Rai was later cleared of all charges in the case.

In 1996, Rai contested the Vidhan Sabha elections from the Kolasla seat on a BJP ticket. He defeated the nine-time CPI MLA Udal by a narrow margin of 484 votes. He went on to retain the seat in the 2002 and 2007 elections, defeating Awadhesh Singh of Bahujan Samaj Party (BSP) by much larger margins. He relied on the Bhumihar and Brahmin vote banks in the Kolasla constituency.

=== Samajwadi Party (SP) ===
In 2007, Rai denied the rumours that he was planning to join the Samajwadi Party (SP), stating that the SP was responsible for "all the ills plaguing the State". However, in 2009, he resigned as an MLA, after BJP refused to give him a ticket for contesting the Lok Sabha elections from Varanasi. He then joined SP, and contested the elections against BJP's Murli Manohar Joshi. He lost the elections, getting the third highest number of votes after Joshi and Mukhtar Ansari. His supporters allegedly campaigned for Joshi to ensure the defeat of his arch-rival Mukhtar Ansari in a communally-polarized environment.

=== Independent ===
After losing the Lok Sabha elections, he contested the Kolasla by-elections as an independent. He alleged that BSP had pressurised him to join the party, and when he refused, his security cover was reduced. During the campaigning, he accused some police officers of pressurising his supporters to work for the candidate of the ruling BSP. When he protested against the alleged harassment, he and seven of his supporters were arrested. Rai won the by-elections. In 2010, Rai staged a sit-in to protest the arrest of the local corporator Sanjay Singh and his associate Jitin Jha. The two had been arrested for assaulting and robbing a hotel owner. After Rai refused to end his protest, he and his supporters were arrested.

=== Indian National Congress (INC) ===
After the Kolasla constituency ceased to exist post-delimitation, Rai won from the 2012 Assembly elections from the new Pindra constituency, which comprises a sizeable portion of the former Kolasla constituency. He routed the BJP candidate, who received just 3,000 votes. When he contested the 2012 elections, Rai was an accused in 16 criminal cases, and was booked under the Gangster Act and Goonda Act. According to him, he had been framed in four cases by the Bahujan Samaj Party regime, while other cases were "mostly over".

Rai was the Congress candidate in the 2014 Lok Sabha elections from Varanasi. He lost to BJP's prime-ministerial nominee Narendra Modi, coming third after Arvind Kejriwal.

On 5 October 2015, Rai was arrested for his alleged role in the violence and arson in Varanasi during a march by seers and other local leaders against police action on protesters opposing ban on immersion of Ganesha idols in the Ganga river. He was released 7 months later, when the Allahabad High Court granted him bail.

In 2017, Rai lost Uttar Pradesh state elections from Pindra as a Congress candidate. Since then, he has participated in protests against Prime Minister Narendra Modi in the Varanasi city.

In 2019, Rai lost the Lok Sabha Elections from Varanasi constituency as a Congress candidate against Narendra Modi, securing third place.

In 2024, Rai lost the Lok Sabha Elections from Varanasi constituency as a Congress candidate against Narendra Modi, securing second place. But Narendra Modi's majority decreased to 152,513 votes.

== Electoral record ==
Year	Election	Party	Constituency Name	Result	Votes gained	Vote share%	Margin
1996	13th UP Assembly	Bharatiya Janata Party	Kolasla	Won	38,352	26.67%	488
2002	14th UP Assembly	Bharatiya Janata Party	Kolasla	Won	56,454	37.54%	15,268
2007	15th UP Assembly	Bharatiya Janata Party	Kolasla	Won	41,935	28.27%	4,956
2009	15th Lok Sabha	Samajwadi Party	Varanasi	Lost	123,874	18.61%	79,248
2009 (By-election)	15th UP Assembly	Independent	Kolasla	Won	43,711	27.50%	8,837
2012	16th Uttar Pradesh Assembly	Indian National Congress	Pindra	Won	52,863	29.31%	9,218
2014	16th Lok Sabha	Indian National Congress	Varanasi	Lost	75,614	7.34%	5,05,408
2017	17th UP Assembly	Indian National Congress	Pindra	Lost	48,189	23.58%	42,425
2019	17th Lok Sabha	Indian National Congress	Varanasi	Lost	152,548	14.38%	5,22,116
2022	18th UP Assembly	Indian National Congress	Pindra	Lost	48,248	21.88%	36,077
2024	18th Lok Sabha	Indian National Congress	Varanasi	Lost	460,457	40.74%	152,513
