= Pindra Road railway station =

Railway station in Uttar Pradesh, India

General information
- Location: Satomahua-Mangari Road, Pindra, Uttar Pradesh; India
- Coordinates: 25.4946°N 82.8529°E
- Elevation: 82 metres (269 ft)
- System: Indian Railways station
- Owner: Indian Railways
- Operator: Northern Railway
- Line: Varanasi–Lucknow line
- Platforms: 2
- Tracks: 2

Construction
- Structure type: Standard (on-ground station)
- Parking: No
- Cycle facilities: No

Other information
- Status: Double electric line
- Station code: PDRD
- Zone(s): Northern Railway
- Division(s): Lucknow NR
Location
- Location within India Location within Uttar Pradesh

Pindra Road railway station is a small railway station in Varanasi district, Uttar Pradesh. Its code is PDRD. It serves Pindra area of Varanasi. The station consists of two platforms. The platforms are not well sheltered. It lacks many facilities including water and sanitation.
