= Avadhesh Singh =

Indian politician (born 1955)

Member of Uttar Pradesh Legislative Assembly
- Incumbent
- Assumed office 19 March 2017
- Preceded by: Ajay Rai
- Constituency: Pindra

Personal details
- Born: 1 February 1955 (age 71) India
- Party: Bharatiya Janata Party
- Other political affiliations: Indian National Congress; Bahujan Samaj Party
- Parent: Murat Singh (father)
- Profession: Politician

Avadhesh Singh (born 1 February 1955) is an Indian politician and a member of the 17th Legislative Assembly of Uttar Pradesh. He represents the Pindra constituency of Varanasi district. He is a member of the Bharatiya Janata Party.

== Political career ==
Singh has been a member of the Congress, BSP. In the 17th Legislative Assembly of Uttar Pradesh, he has represented the Pindra constituency and is a member of the Bharatiya Janata Party since 2017.

== Posts held ==
#	From	To	Position	Comments
01	2017	Incumbent	Member of 17th Legislative Assembly	substandard performance

== See also ==
- Uttar Pradesh Legislative Assembly
