= Tisaura =

Village in Uttar Pradesh, India

- Village

Tisaura or Babhanpura is a village in Varanasi sadar tehsil, Varanasi district in Uttar Pradesh state in India, located 20 kilometres (12 mi) from the cantonment railway station in Varanasi and 12 kilometres (7.5 mi) from its airport. It is located 20.42 km from its

District Main City Varanasi on the highway that connects it to Nepal, and 261 km from its State Main City Lucknow.
