= Udal (politician) =

Indian state politician

MLA
- Succeeded by: Ajay Rai
- Constituency: Kolasla

Personal details
- Born: Udal Singh
- Citizenship: India
- Political party: Communist Party of India (Marxist) (CPI-M)

Udal was an Indian state politician and member of Uttar Pradesh Legislative Assembly. He was a nine-time MLA from Kolasla constituency on the CPI-M ticket. He was one of the prominent leaders of CPI-M.
