= Khalispur, Varanasi =

Khalispur
- Village
- Location in Uttar Pradesh, India Khalispur (India)
- Coordinates: 25°20′23″N 83°02′45″E
- Country: India
- State: Uttar Pradesh
- District: Varanasi
- Subdistrict: Varanasi

Population (2011)
  - Total: 2,892
- Time zone: UTC+05:30 (IST)
- Pincode: 221206
- Vehicle registration: UP

Khalispur is a village in Varanasi tehsil of the Varanasi district, Uttar Pradesh, India. The population was 2,892 at the 2011 Indian census. The village is located on the banks of the river Ganges.

Khalispur is served by the Khalispur railway station on the Indian Railways Lucknow Charbagh railway division. Despite this, most of the trains stop at the Ghazipur City railway station, which is also the town center.
