= Baragaon, Varanasi =

- Town
- Location in Uttar Pradesh, India
- Coordinates: 25.43°N 82.82°E
- Country: India
- State: Uttar Pradesh
- District: Varanasi
- Elevation: 88 m (289 ft)

Population (2001)
  - Total: 10,517

Languages
  - Official: Hindi
- Time zone: UTC+5:30 (IST)

Baragaon is a census town in Varanasi district in the state of Uttar Pradesh, India.

== Geography ==
Baragaon is located at 25.43°N 82.82°E. It has an average elevation of 88 metres (288 feet).

== History ==
Baragaon has been identified with the village of Vaḍagavā-grāma, in the pattalā of Vāvana, mentioned in an 11th-century royal grant inscription found at nearby Chandravati. This inscription is dated to November 1090 and records the village being granted by Chandradeva, the ruling monarch from the Gahadavala dynasty, to someone named Varuṇeśvara-śarman.

== Demographics ==
As of 2001 India census, Baragaon had a population of 10,517. Males constitute 53% of the population and females 47%. Baragaon has an average literacy rate of 56%, lower than the national average of 59.5%; with 65% of the males and 35% of females literate. 21% of the population is under 6 years of age.

== Education ==
Baragaon is considered as educational hub of nearby areas. Shri Baldeo Post Graduate College is preferred by most students of the area for higher studies. Baragaon is near to International airport varanasi.

== About town ==
Baragaon is a medium-scale town of Varanasi District about 15 km away, and 3 km from the international airport (Babatpur). Baragaon has its own history and identity. A 500-year-old Sri Ram-Janki Temple is situated near a pond. Sharda Canal passes through the heart of the town, which provides ample water for the agricultural land. The town has good medical facilities with a hospital by Dr. Awadhesh Singh dedicated to eye surgery specialization and another 100-year-old Baldeo hospital by Dr S D Agarwal in the old Bazar. The hospital provides health care to the surrounding towns and villages. The hospital has been renovated recently and is equipped with all ultramodern facilities.

Major means of income for the people of the town is from the weaving of Intricate Banarasi Sari on Silk, Carpet manufacturing. Since 2015, a major bypass passes through the town that connects the town to Varanasi which has reduced the commute to 45 Minutes to the heart of Varanasi. Several Schools and Colleges are also springing up, that provide courses in engineering and management to the younger generation. This town also has five national bank branches and several automated teller machines for financial services. Baragaon panchayat kshetra consists of many villages, and in which some are, Baragaon, Diha, Pachrasi, Baurahawan, Khushiyalipur, Bisaipur, Sitapur, Koiripur, Kusahi, Madanpur, Gangkala, Kundi (कूँड़ी)and Bhattha etc.
