= Amilus =

Amilus or Amilos (Greek: Άμιλος) was a settlement in ancient Arcadia. It was situated in the territory of Orchomenus, on the road from Orchomenus to Stymphalus. A road to Pheneus branched off here. The springs of Teneiae were about 1 km from Amilus. The location of the ancient settlement is unknown.
