= Babatpur railway station =

Railway station in Uttar Pradesh, India

General information
- Location: Satomahua-Mangari Road, Varanasi, U.P. 221006; India
- Coordinates: 25.453954°N 82.880297°E
- Elevation: 85.627 m (280.93 ft)
- System: Indian Railways station
- Owner: Indian Railways
- Operator: Indian Railways
- Platforms: 2
- Tracks: 4 double Electrified tracks
- Train operators: Indian Railways
- Connections: Auto rickshaw Bus

Construction
- Structure type: Standard (on-ground station)
- Parking: Available
- Cycle facilities: Available
- Accessible: Not available

Other information
- Status: Active
- Station code: BTP
- Zone(s): Northern Railway
- Division(s): Varanasi
- Fare zone: Northern Railway zone
Location
- Location within Varanasi district

Babatpur railway station is one of the railway stations in Varanasi district. It is 5 km East of Lal Bahadur Shastri International Airport, 22 km North-West of Varanasi Junction railway station and 29 km North-West of Banaras Hindu University. It primarily serves the Pindra tehsil.

== See also ==
- Varanasi Junction railway station
- Kerakat railway station
