= Pindra Assembly constituency =

Constituency of the Uttar Pradesh legislative assembly in India

Pindra
- Constituency No. 384 for the Uttar Pradesh Legislative Assembly

Constituency details
- Country: India
- Region: North India
- State: Uttar Pradesh
- District: Varanasi
- Reservation: None

Member of Legislative Assembly
- 18th Uttar Pradesh Legislative Assembly
- Incumbent Avadhesh Singh
- Party: Bharatiya Janata Party
- Elected year: 2022

Pindra is one of the 403 constituencies of the Uttar Pradesh Legislative Assembly, India. It is a part of the Varanasi district and one of the five assembly constituencies in the Machhlishahr Lok Sabha constituency. Pindra Assembly constituency came into existence in 2008 as a result of the "Delimitation of Parliamentary and Assembly Constituencies Order, 2008".

== Wards / Areas ==
Pindra assembly constituency comprises the following Wards / areas.

#	Name	Reserved for	Comments
01	Pindra	None	
02	Anei	None	
03	Basani	None	
04	Bahutara	None	
05	Bhanpur	None	
06	Baikunthpur	None	
07	Murdi	None	
08	Nahiya	None	
09	Baragaon of Harahaua KC	None	
10	Baragaon CT of Pindra Tehsil	None	

== Members of Legislative Assembly ==
Year	Member	Party
Till 2012 : Constituency did not exist
2012	Ajay Rai	Indian National Congress
2017	Avadhesh Singh	Bharatiya Janata Party
2022	Avadhesh Singh	Bharatiya Janata Party

== Election results ==
=== 2027 ===
2027 Uttar Pradesh Legislative Assembly election: Pindra
Party	Candidate	Votes	%	±%
BJP	Avadhesh Singh			
INC	Ajay Rai			
BSP	Manish Chaubey			
NOTA	None of the above			
Majority				
Turnout				
gain from		Swing		

=== 2022 ===
2022 Uttar Pradesh Legislative Assembly election: Pindra
Party	Candidate	Votes	%	±%
BJP	Avadhesh Singh	84,325	38.23	−6.11
BSP	Babulal	48,766	22.11	−4.2
INC	Ajay Rai	48,248	21.88	−1.7
AD(K)	Rajesh Kumar Singh	33,020	14.97	
NOTA	None of the above	2,576	1.17	−0.26
Majority		35,559	16.12	−1.91
Turnout		220,547	59.05	−0.62
BJP hold		Swing		

=== 2017 ===
2017 Uttar Pradesh Legislative Assembly election: Pindra
Party	Candidate	Votes	%	±%
BJP	Avadhesh Singh	90,614	44.34	
BSP	Babulal	53,765	26.31	
INC	Ajay Rai	48,189	23.58	
CPI	Shyamlal Singh	2,672	1.31	
NOTA	None of the above	2,889	1.43	
Majority		36,849	18.03	
Turnout		204,375	59.67	
BJP gain from INC		Swing	+15.03	

=== 2012 ===
2012 Uttar Pradesh Legislative Assembly election: Pindra
Party	Candidate	Votes	%	±%
INC	Ajay Rai	52,863	29.31	−
BSP	Jai Prakash	43,645	24.2	−
AD(K)	Sunil Patel	40,330	22.4	−
	Remainder eleven candidates	43,367	24.0	−
Majority		9,218	5.11	−
Turnout		180,343	56.4	−
INC win (new seat)				

== See also ==
- Pindra Tehsil
- Varanasi
- Government of Uttar Pradesh
- List of Vidhan Sabha constituencies of Uttar Pradesh
- Uttar Pradesh
- Uttar Pradesh Legislative Assembly
