= Pindra =

- Tehsil
- Tehsil location on map
- Coordinates: 25.486478°N 82.828045°E
- Country: India
- State: Uttar Pradesh
- First settled: 1630

Area
  - Total: 7.1832 km^{2} (2.7734 sq mi)
- Elevation: 84 m (276 ft)

Population (2011)
  - Total: 15,257

Languages
  - Official: Hindi
- Time zone: UTC+5:30 (IST)
- Postal code: 221206
- Telephone code: +91-542
- Vehicle registration: UP65 XXXX
- Sub-district code: 009995
- Lok Sabha constituency: Varanasi
- Vidhan Sabha constituency: Pindra

Pindra is one of three tehsils (sub-districts) in Varanasi district in the Indian state of Uttar Pradesh. Pindra is situated 24 kilometers from the city of Varanasi and has 424 villages.

== History ==
Pindra Village /Town was first settled during the rule of Mughal Emperor Shahjahan in year 1630, when the place became a jagir with the name Aslah and Mir Muhammad Khan a pathan from Yousufzai clan was given its charge. He also built a fort-like structure or a soldier settlement also known as Aslah, Here war weapons were made and sold so the place derived its name KolAslah. He also had some conflicts with Vikram Shah of Birkrampur because of which he was removed from the post. He was Buried in his tomb located there, some inscription in Persian is written there talking about unity and peace between vikrampur and pindra. Now only some ruins of the old fort remain there. Later his descendants also made a mosque known as Badi Masjid of the village. A small population of Muslim Pathans live there who are mostly Mir Muhammad's descendants. During the period of Aurangzeb many Rajput, Brahman families settled near pindra a place named as Ushra Shaheed, from where they scattered in different Hamlets. There was also a huge settlement in later years of Yadavs at a place named Ahiran. The first Rajput who settled there was Bariar Singh who became notable man of the pargana his daughter Gulab Kumari was married to Raja Balwant Singh of Banaras. The place remained in the possession of Bariar Singh's Family till 1799 when it was confiscated on account of the implication of Babu sheoparan singh in the rebellion of Nawab Wazir Ali of Awadh and bestowned on Maharaja Udit Narayan Singh. During Massacre of Benares.

== Demography ==
Pindra Tehsil has total population of 804,481. Out of this, 411,176 are male and 393,305 are female. The gender ratio in Pindra is 957 females per 1,000 males, which is higher than Uttar Pradesh's state average of 912 females per 1,000 males.^{[note]} As of 2011 census the main population of the town pindar had the area of 92.2 acres and had 2278 households. The Pindra village had a population of 15257 as of 2011 Census.

Historical population
Year	Pop.	±% p.a.
1901	3,460	—
1911	3,433	−0.08%
1921	3,500	+0.19%
1931	3,540	+0.11%
1941	3,600	+0.17%
1951	3,700	+0.27%
1961	3,758	+0.16%
1971	5,387	+3.67%
1981	7,668	+3.59%
1991	8,337	+0.84%
2001	9,628	+1.45%
2011	15,257	+4.71%

== Climate ==
Climate data for Pindra
Month	Jan	Feb	Mar	Apr	May	Jun	Jul	Aug	Sep	Oct	Nov	Dec	Year
Mean daily maximum °C (°F)	18 (64)	19 (66)	20 (68)	27 (81)	22 (72)	20 (68)	20 (68)	23 (73)	20 (68)	29 (84)	24 (75)	22 (72)	22 (72)
Mean daily minimum °C (°F)	13 (55)	13 (55)	13 (55)	20 (68)	19 (66)	20 (68)	16 (61)	13 (55)	18 (64)	24 (75)	19 (66)	17 (63)	17 (63)
Average precipitation mm (inches)	0.0 (0.0)	18 (0.7)	9 (0.4)	0 (0)	0 (0)	96 (3.8)	144 (5.7)	162 (6.4)	201 (7.9)	24 (0.9)	0 (0)	6 (0.2)	660 (26)
Source: World Weather Online

== Location ==
Pindra is located 24 kilometers North-West of Varanasi, 287 kilometers South-East of the state capital of Lucknow, 269 kilometers West of Patna and 132 kilometers East of Allahabad.

== Transportation ==
Pindra is connected to National Highway 56 and is also serviced by Indian Railways (Pindra Road railway station). Closest airport to Pindra is Varanasi airport, (5.5 kilometers and a part of Pindra Tehsil).

== See also ==
- Pindra (Assembly constituency)

== Notes ==
- All demographic data is based on 2011 Census of India.
