= Prayagraj Airport =

Airport serving Prayagraj, Uttar Pradesh, India

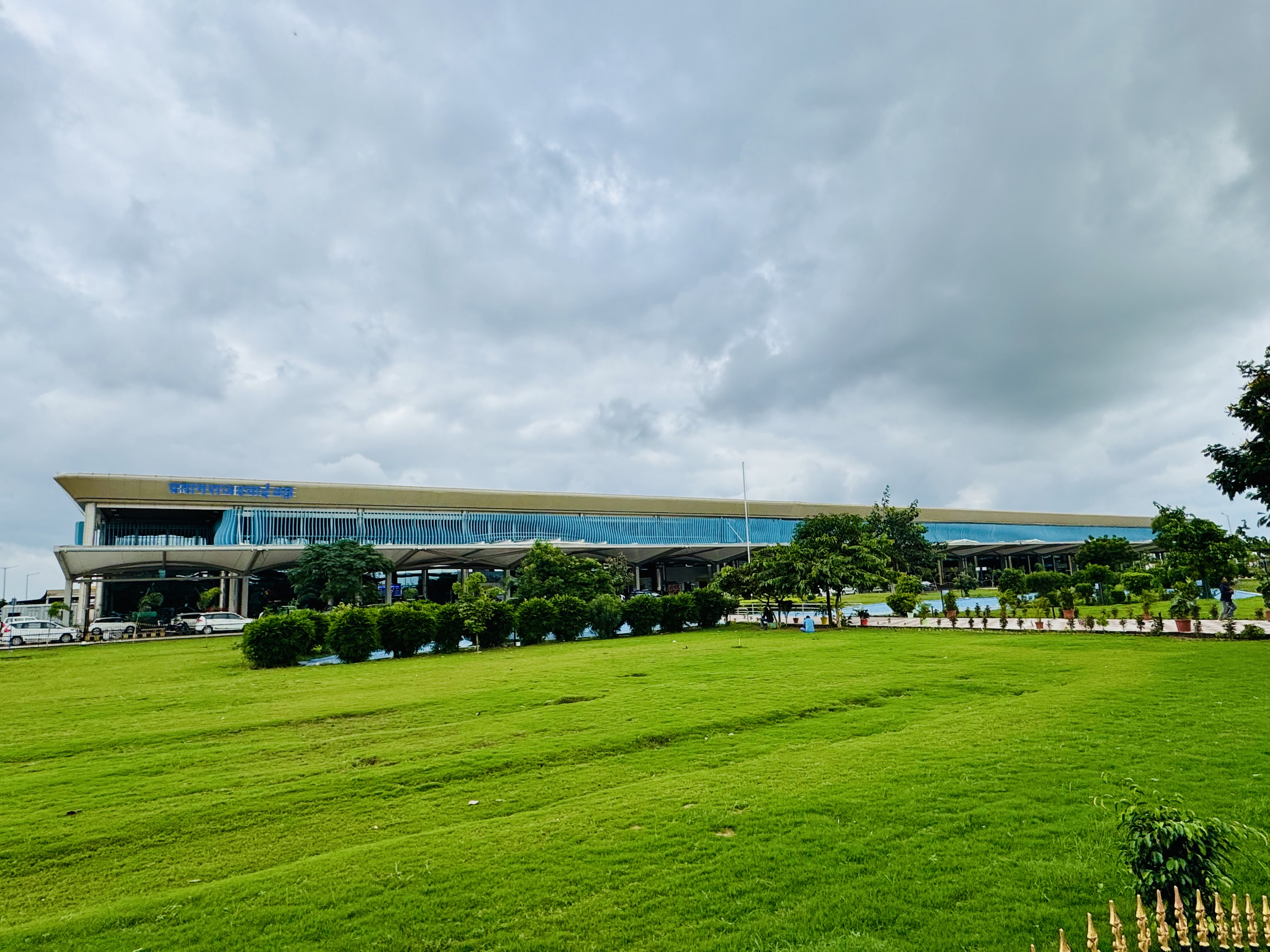
- IATA: IXD; ICAO: VEAB

Summary
- Airport type: Public/Military
- Owner: Indian Air Force
- Operator: Airports Authority of India
- Serves: Prayagraj
- Location: Bamrauli, Prayagraj, Uttar Pradesh, India
- Opened: 1931; 95 years ago
- Elevation AMSL: 322 ft (98 m)
- Coordinates: 25°26′24″N 81°44′02″E
- Website: Prayagraj Airport

Map
- Location of airport in Uttar Pradesh IXD (India)

Runways
Direction	Length		Surface
Direction	ft	m	Surface
12/30	8,400	2,560	Asphalt

Statistics (April 2025 - March 2026)
- Passengers: 5,32,732 (▼ -50.6%)
- Aircraft movements: 3,702 (▼ -61.7%)
- Cargo tonnage: 36.1 (▼ -30%)
- Source: AAI

Prayagraj Airport (IATA: IXD, ICAO: VEAB), also known as Allahabad Airport, is a domestic airport and an Indian Air Force base serving the city of Prayagraj, Uttar Pradesh, India. Located in the Bamrauli suburb of the city and spreading over approximately 800 acres, Prayagraj Airport is among the largest airports in Uttar Pradesh, and one of the oldest airports in India. This airport is currently under joint operation of the Indian Air Force and the Airports Authority of India.

Foreseeing the Kumbh 2019, the airport was upgraded with the addition of a new civil terminal extension in 2018, which was constructed in a record 11 months by Tata Projects. A new, larger terminal was built just next to this terminal that was completed in January 2025 to cater to the massive flow of traffic during Kumbh 2025. This latest addition and the phenomenal festival made the airport structurally a single terminal after refurbishing, and made it among the nation's busiest, with passenger traffic crossing 1 million for the first time in financial year 2024-25.

== Air Force Station Bamrauli ==
The Air Force station is located in the Bamrauli area of Prayagraj and is the headquarters of Central Air Command. It is one of the bases of Indian Armed Forces which operates under Central Air Command of Indian Air Force.

== History ==
On 18 February 1911, domestic commercial aviation began in India when Henri Piquet flew a Humber biplane carrying mail from a polo field at Allahabad (now Prayagraj) to Naini, approximately six miles away. The construction of an airport at Allahabad with a dedicated airfield was started in 1924.

In 1931, the aerodrome at Allahabad was set up and the foundation for air traffic control services was laid with the appointment of an Indian Aerodrome Officer, specially trained at the airport in the UK. It was among the first four international airports of the country. It catered to international flights with direct services to London until 1932.

In July 1933, Imperial Airways commenced the operation of its flight on the Karachi-Jodhpur-Delhi-Kanpur-Allahabad-Kolkata route, which ran until June 1940. The airfield at Bamrauli was also used as one of the five compulsory stops of the MacRobertson Trophy Air Race which took place in October 1934.

From 1941 to the early 2000s, the airport did not cater to any regular commercial flight services. In the early months of 2003, Air Sahara became the first carrier to re-introduce services at the airport with connectivity to cities like Delhi and Kolkata. However, services soon became defunct following an economic crisis. In 2005, Alliance Air (a regional connectivity subsidiary under Air India) started its Allahabad-Delhi flight service on the ATR-72 fleet, which continues to be operational to this day, with minor non-operational periods in between.

In 2013, SpiceJet introduced its operation in the Delhi-Allahabad sector, along with Alliance Air commencing its Allahabad-Mumbai flight, both of which were closed down due to non-availability of ILS and night landing facilities at the airport after running for a few months.

Seeking limited operational and structural facilities, construction of a new civilian terminal and installation of an ILS system on the existing runway began in January 2018. The newly constructed terminal was opened to the public in January 2019 and has since served regular flight operations at Prayagraj.

Prayagraj Airport has been included in India's UDAN (Ude Desh ka Aam Naagrik) regional connectivity scheme to enhance low-cost air travel. Several unserved and underserved routes from Prayagraj, including to regional cities in Bihar, Madhya Pradesh, and Jharkhand, are proposed or under consideration. Planned International Flights: While currently operating only domestic services, there have been ongoing discussions to develop the airport’s capabilities for international operations, especially to Gulf countries and Southeast Asia, targeting the large diaspora from Eastern Uttar Pradesh.

== Structure ==
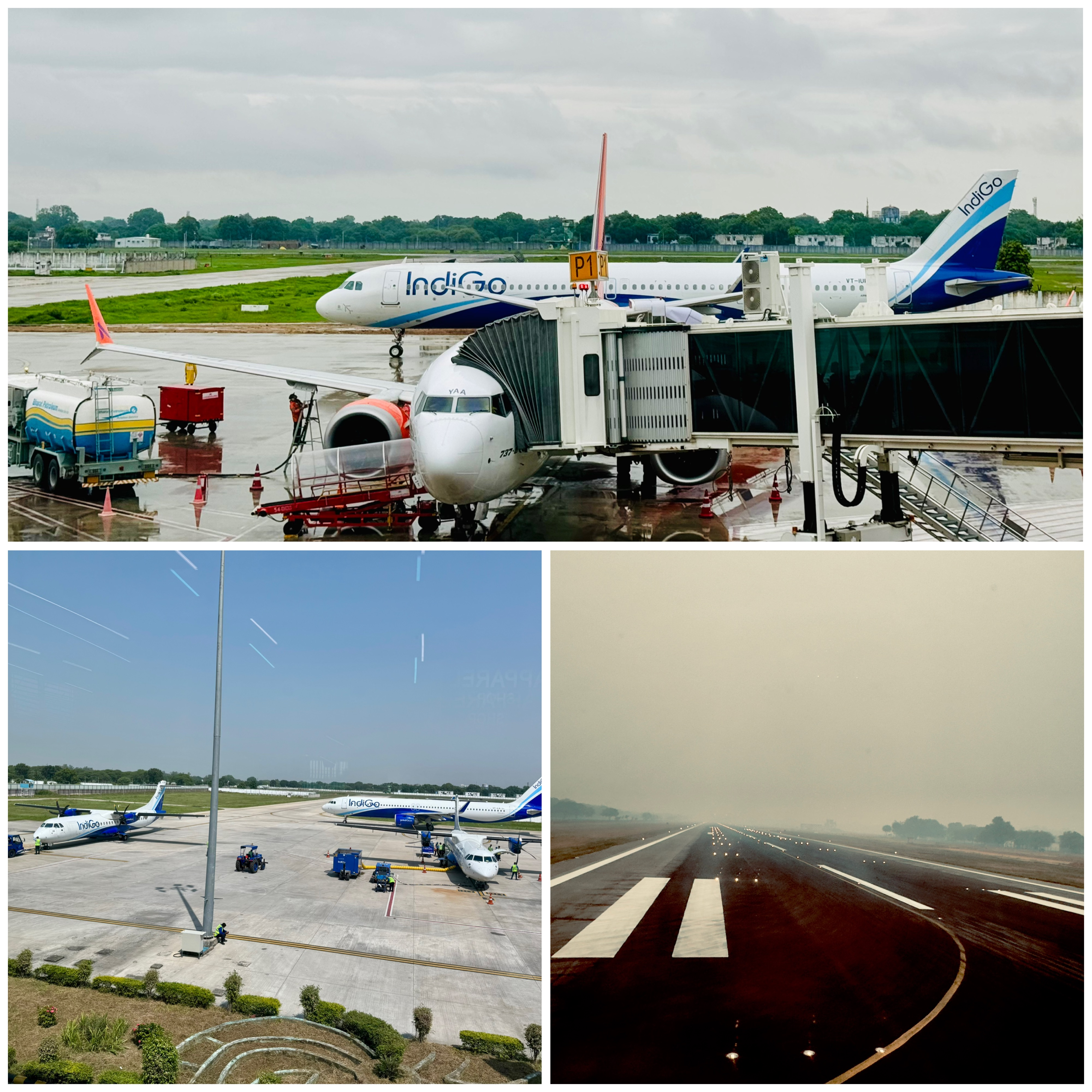
Prayagraj Airport Infrastructure

=== Runway ===
The airport is served by a single runway 12/30, which is 2,560 meters (8,400 ft) long and 45 meters (148 ft) wide.

=== Landing amenities ===
The airport is ILS CAT-I compliant for landing during the night, bad weather and foggy conditions. The instrument landing system was installed during the 2018–2019 expansion phase, along with construction of the new terminal. Other than enhancing safety for landing flights in visibility as low as 550 meters, the installation of ILS finally allowed the airport to operate flights at night.

== New terminal ==
Construction of the new terminal began in January 2018 and was completed in December 2018. It was inaugurated by Prime Minister Narendra Modi. The terminal was constructed for ₹164 crore (US$17 million). A total of 83 acres (34 ha) was allocated for the construction of this terminal.

The terminal is 6700 square meters, and has a peak per hour capacity of 300 passengers and four aircraft parking bays for Airbus A320 and Boeing 737.

The building has an electric operated trolley gate on the link taxi track to segregate the operational area of Airports Authority of India and Indian Air Force. There has been use of fly ash bricks; double insulated door and the building is equipped with water harvesting and has a sewage treatment plant of its own.

=== Phase 2 extension ===
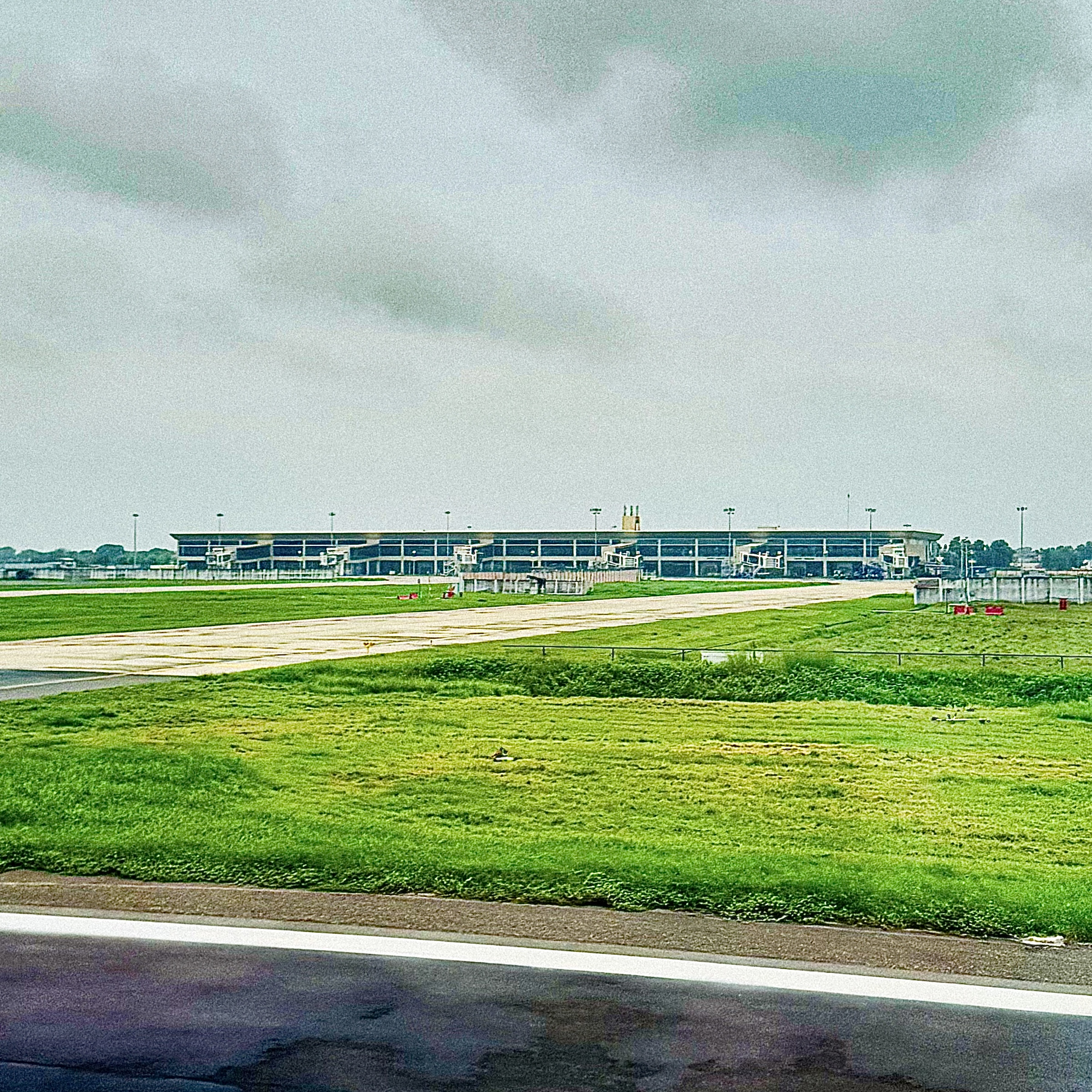
The extended Prayagraj Airport apron in 2025 (runway view)

In February 2021, it was reported that there were plans for a complete makeover of the civil enclave of Prayagraj in Bamrauli in terms of size and facilities. The AAI proposed to double the airport's size, with the present building of the airport being expanded on both sides, keeping the terminal the same.

The project involves reconfiguring the existing terminal building and partially commissioning a new terminal, increasing the combined passenger handling capacity from 350 to approximately 2,050 passengers per hour. The total terminal area will expand from 6,500 sq. mtrs. to 18,500 sq. mtrs., enhancing passenger comfort and operational efficiency. Infrastructure upgrades also include an increase in the apron area, allowing aircraft parking bays to grow from four to 15, accommodating up to 7 Airbus A320s and eight smaller aircraft. A newly constructed taxiway will further streamline ground operations, and night landing facilities will ensure round-the-clock functionality. Improvements extend beyond flight operations. The city-side infrastructure now includes an expanded car parking capacity of 600 vehicles, up from 200.

== Airlines and destinations ==
Airlines	Destinations
Akasa Air	Mumbai
Alliance Air	Bilaspur, Delhi
IndiGo	Bangalore, Bhubaneswar, Delhi, Hyderabad, Mumbai, Raipur

== Statistics ==
During the Mahakumbh 2025, records were set including handling 100 flights in single day. The total passenger footfall between 17 and 26 February 2025 was 2.38 lakh while the first 36 days saw the movement of 3.20 lakh passengers. The total count during 46 days of Maha Kumbh festivity was 5,59,178 flyers. Overall, the airport became among the top 20 busiest airports in India in financial year 2024-25, with passenger traffic exceeding 1 million for the first time. . In 2025, Prayagraj Airport handled approximately one million passengers. During the year, the airport operated around 30 flights per week, providing direct connectivity to six destinations across India, and recorded a modest operating profit..

== Customer Satisfaction ==
Prayagraj Airport Jumped 25 places in this year customer satisfaction surveys from 37th to 12th.

== Magh Mela 2026 preparations ==
In preparation for Magh Mela 2026, Prayagraj Airport announced plans to expand air services to accommodate an expected increase in pilgrim and tourist traffic. A new direct flight between Prayagraj and Hindon Airport (Ghaziabad) is scheduled to commence in January 2026, subject to operational clearances.

== See also ==
- List of airports in India
- List of the busiest airports in India
- Lal Bahadur Shastri Airport
- Gaya Airport
