= Lal Bahadur Shastri Airport =

Airport serving Varanasi, Uttar Pradesh, India

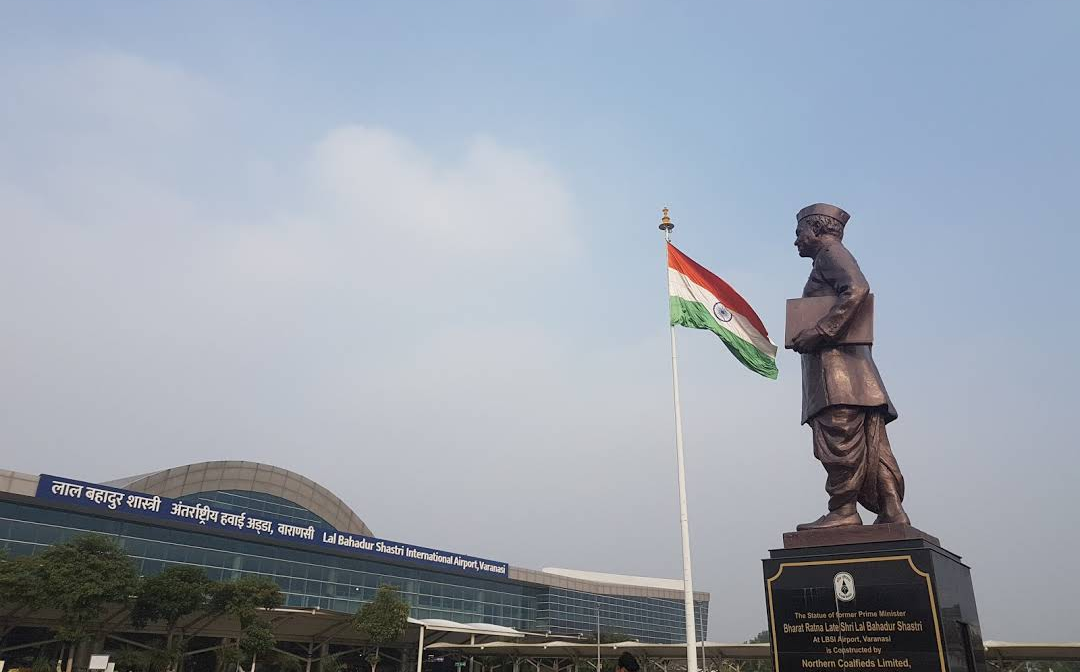
- IATA: VNS; ICAO: VEBN

Summary
- Airport type: Public
- Owner: Government of India
- Operator: Airports Authority of India
- Serves: Varanasi
- Location: Babatpur, Varanasi district, Uttar Pradesh, India
- Elevation AMSL: 270 ft (82 m)
- Coordinates: 25°27′08″N 082°51′34″E
- Website: Varanasi Airport

Map
- Location of airport in Uttar Pradesh VNS (India)

Runways
Direction	Length		Surface
Direction	m	ft	Surface
09/27	2,745	9,006	Asphalt

Statistics (April 2025 - March 2026)
- Passengers: 43,43,347 (▲7.8%)
- Aircraft movements: 27,822 (▲4.3%)
- Cargo tonnage: 6,843.6 (▲13.4%)
- Source: AAI

Lal Bahadur Shastri Airport (IATA: VNS, ICAO: VEBN) is an international airport serving Varanasi, Uttar Pradesh, India. It is located at Babatpur, 26 km (16 mi) northwest of Varanasi. Formerly known as Varanasi Airport, it was officially renamed after Lal Bahadur Shastri, the 2nd Prime Minister of India, in October 2005. It acquired its position in India's major airports after more than 4 million passengers used the airport in 2024-25. It is the 19th-busiest airport in India in terms of passenger movement, and the second-busiest airport in Uttar Pradesh. The airport was awarded as the best airport in Asia-Pacific in 2020 (2 to 5 million passengers per annum) by Airports Council International. It is the first airport in India to make announcements in Sanskrit language.

== Terminal ==
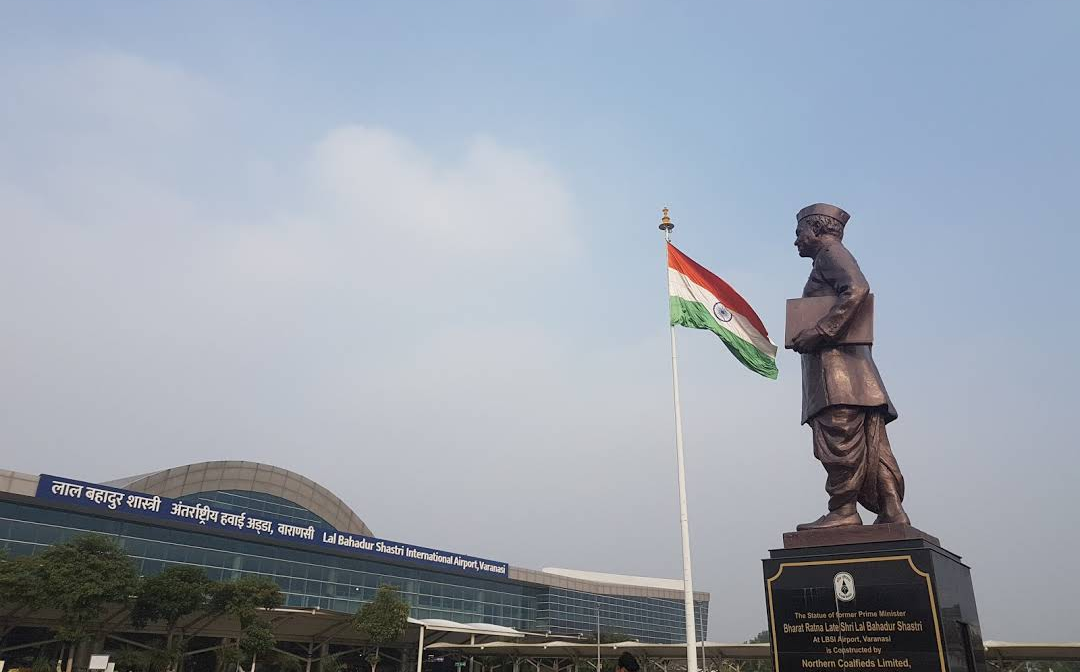
Lal Bahadur Shastri statue at Varanasi Airport

An integrated terminal serves both domestic and international flights, with a floor area of 3,900 square metres (42,000 square feet). The terminal features 16 check-in counters with CUTE (common-user terminal equipment), four immigration counters that double up as emigration counters, and two baggage-claim belts. Besides an upper-level seating area for the aero-bridge gates, the terminal features a ground-level gate to reach other aircraft on the apron on foot, or via shuttle bus. The apron can simultaneously park five narrow-body aircraft. The waiting area features essential services for the passengers, besides snack stalls, a travellers' convenience store, a bookstore with a newsstand, and stores selling merchandise indigenous to Varanasi, such as Banarasi Saris; and a VIP waiting lounge.

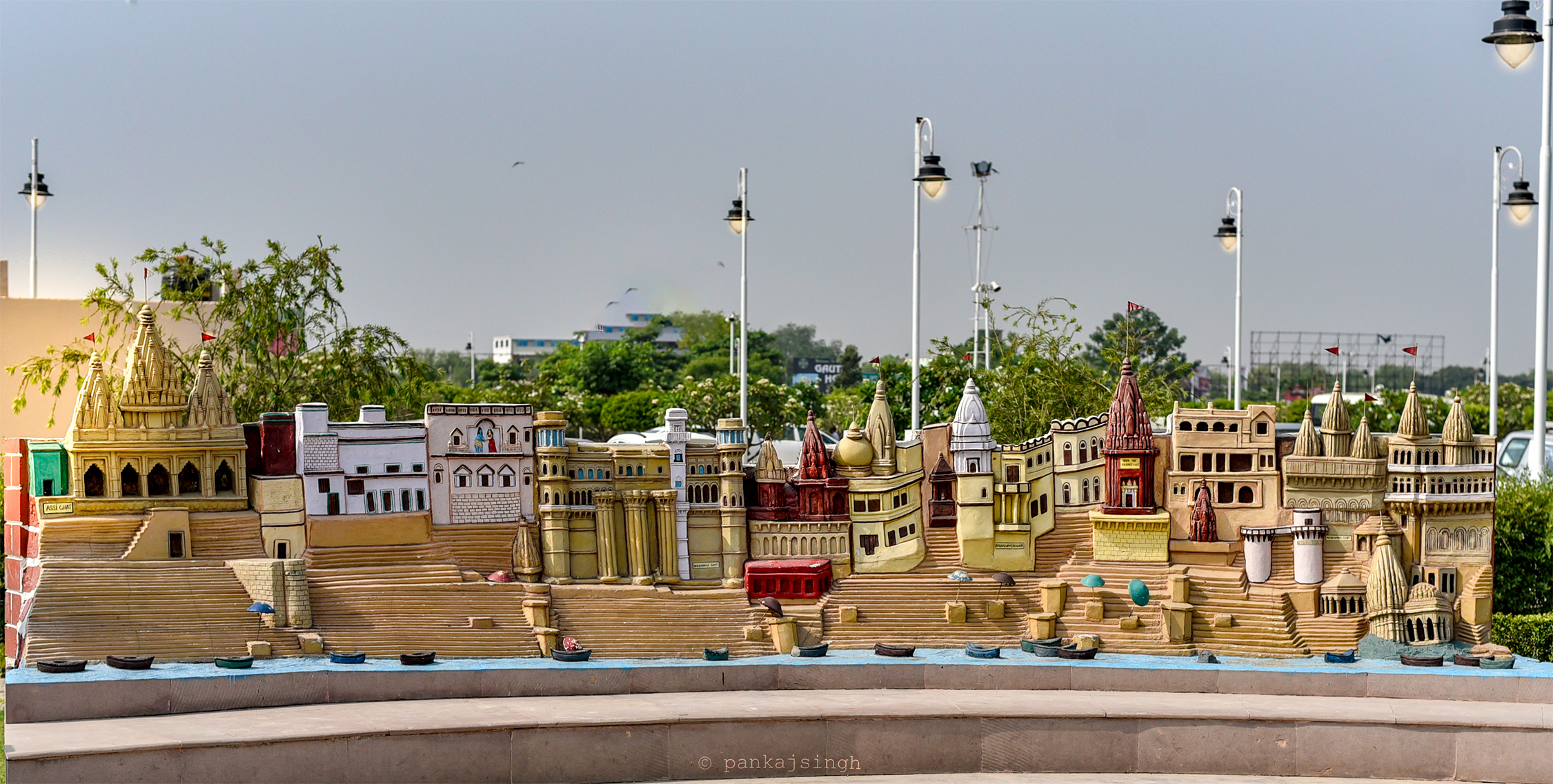
Replica of Varanasi ghats at Varanasi Airport

== Airfield ==
The airport features a single asphalt runway bearing 09/27. It is 9,006 feet (2,745 m) in length, with turnarounds on both ends, and two exits to the main apron. A third, seldom-used exit leads to an isolated apron for use in emergency.

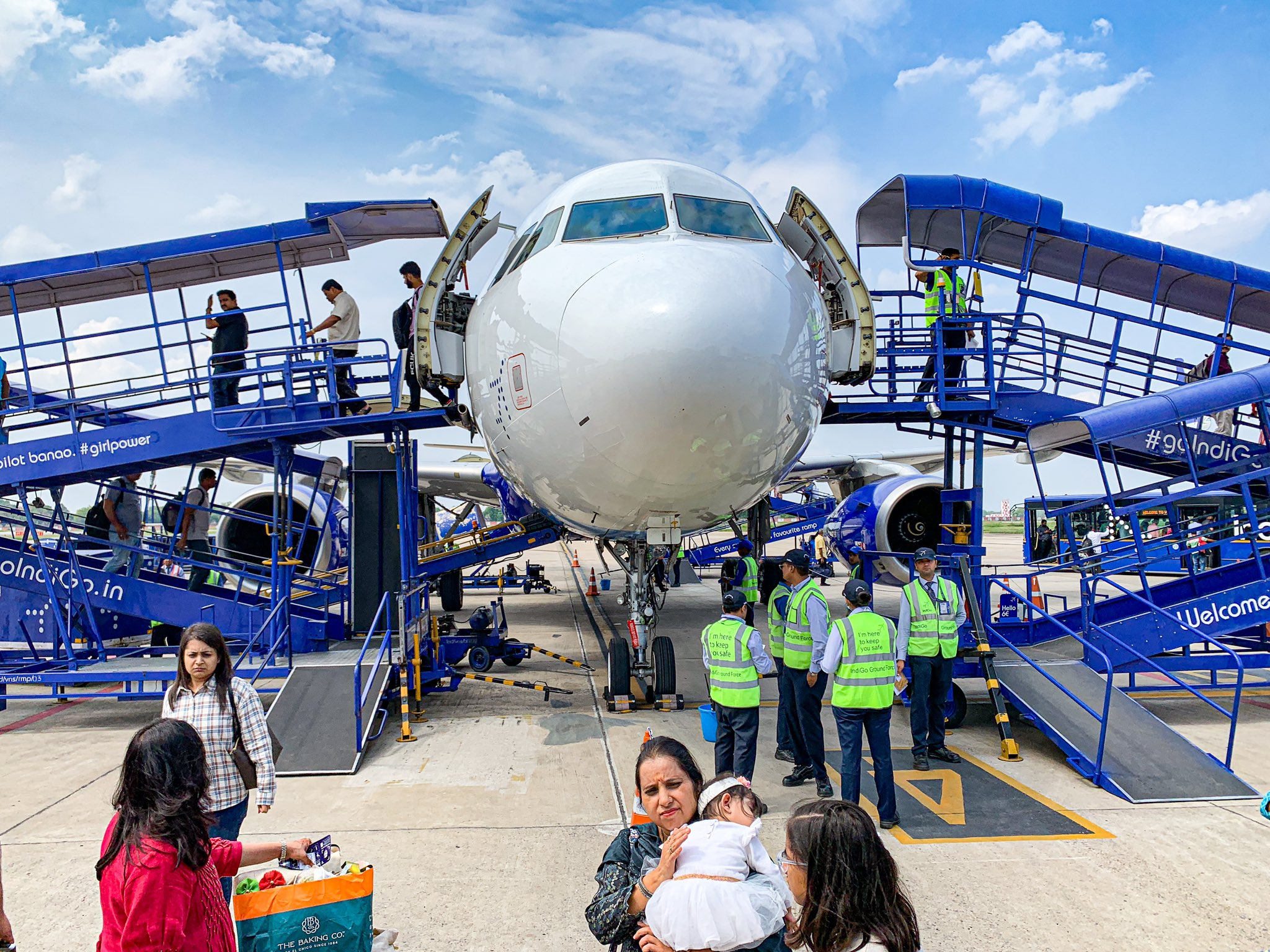
An IndiGo aircraft being serviced by three mobile gangways at Varanasi Airport

== Airlines and destinations ==
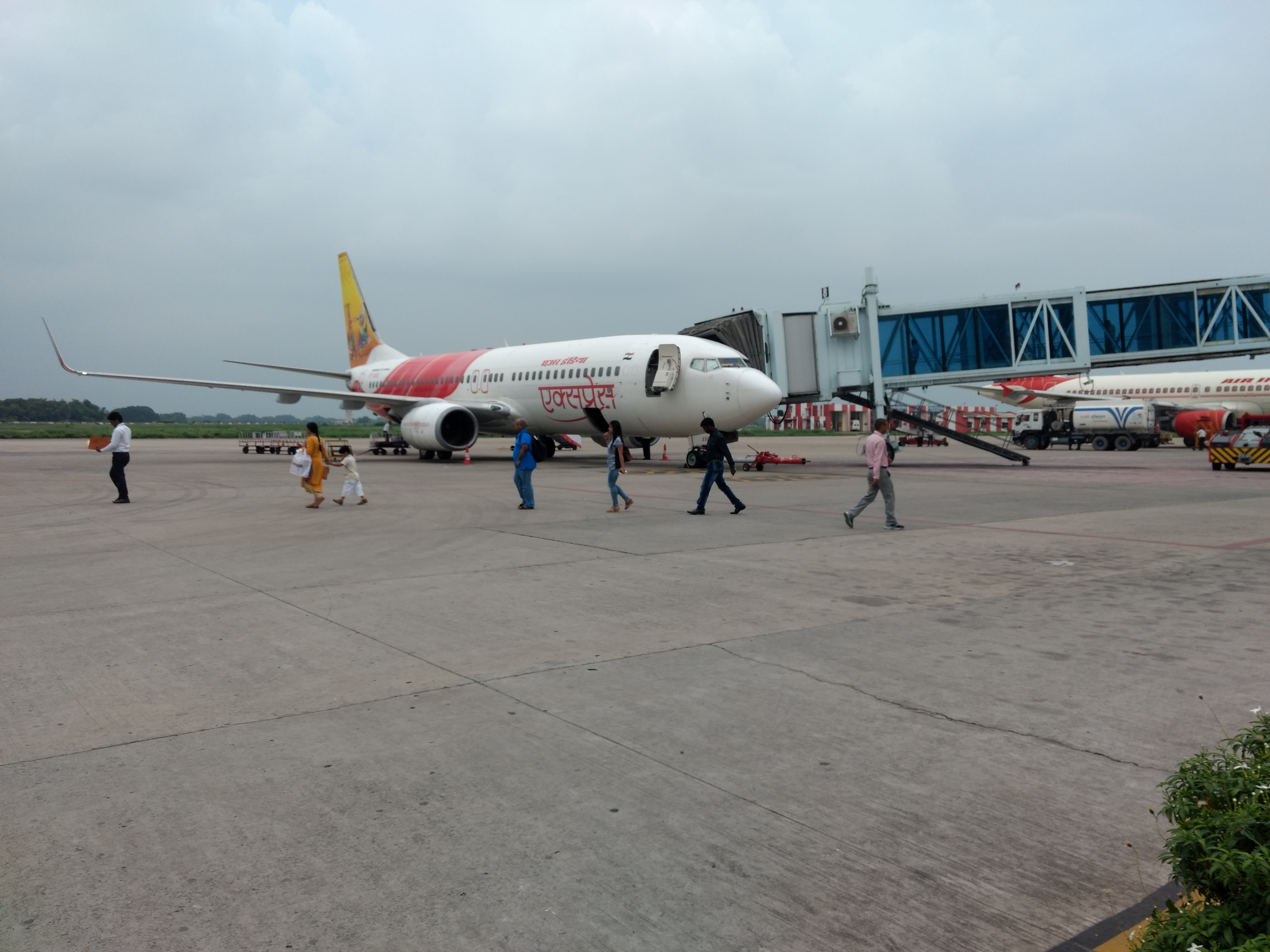
Apron area of the airport

Airlines	Destinations
Air India	Delhi, Mumbai
Air India Express	Bangkok–Suvarnabhumi, Bengaluru, Delhi, Mumbai, Sharjah
Akasa Air	Bengaluru, Hyderabad, Mumbai, Navi Mumbai
Buddha Air	Kathmandu
IndiGo	Ahmedabad, Bengaluru, Bhubaneswar, Chennai, Delhi, Durgapur, Ghaziabad, Hyderabad, Khajuraho, Kolkata, Mumbai, Navi Mumbai, Pune, Vijayawada
SpiceJet	Delhi, Mumbai

== Future plans and projects ==
Due to increasing passenger traffic and aircraft movements, the Airports Authority of India is planning to extend the runway to 4,075 m (13,369 ft) from the existing 2,750 m (9,020 ft). An underpass will be constructed as the expansion will intersect with National Highway 31.

In November 2019, the Airports Authority of India came up with a proposal for a new second terminal, which will be completed by 2024. The total area of the terminal will be 58,691 m^{2} with passenger capacity of 4.5 million per year.

On 20 October 2024, Prime Minister Narendra Modi laid the foundation stone for several projects at the Airport, including the expansion of the airport runway, a new terminal building, and other allied works, totalling around ₹2,870 crore.

== Stats ==
Passenger traffic at Lal Bahadur Shastri International Airport (2025–2026)
Month	2025	2026	Change (%)
January	342,323	335,786	−1.9%
February	399,189	378,989	−5.1%
March	411,756	377,595	−8.3%
April	353,771	342,226	−3.3%
May	396,835	376,173	−5.2%
June	383,170	325,232	−15.1%
July	321,781	253,623	−21.2%
August	301,830	278,623	−7.7%
September	302,300	263,813	−12.7%
January–September total	3,212,955	2,932,060	−8.7%

== See also ==
- List of airports in India
- List of the busiest airports in India
- Chaudhary Charan Singh International Airport
