= Varanasi district =

District in Uttar Pradesh, India

- District
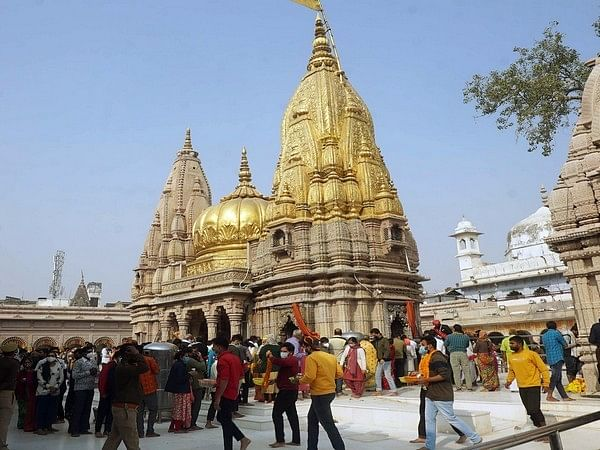
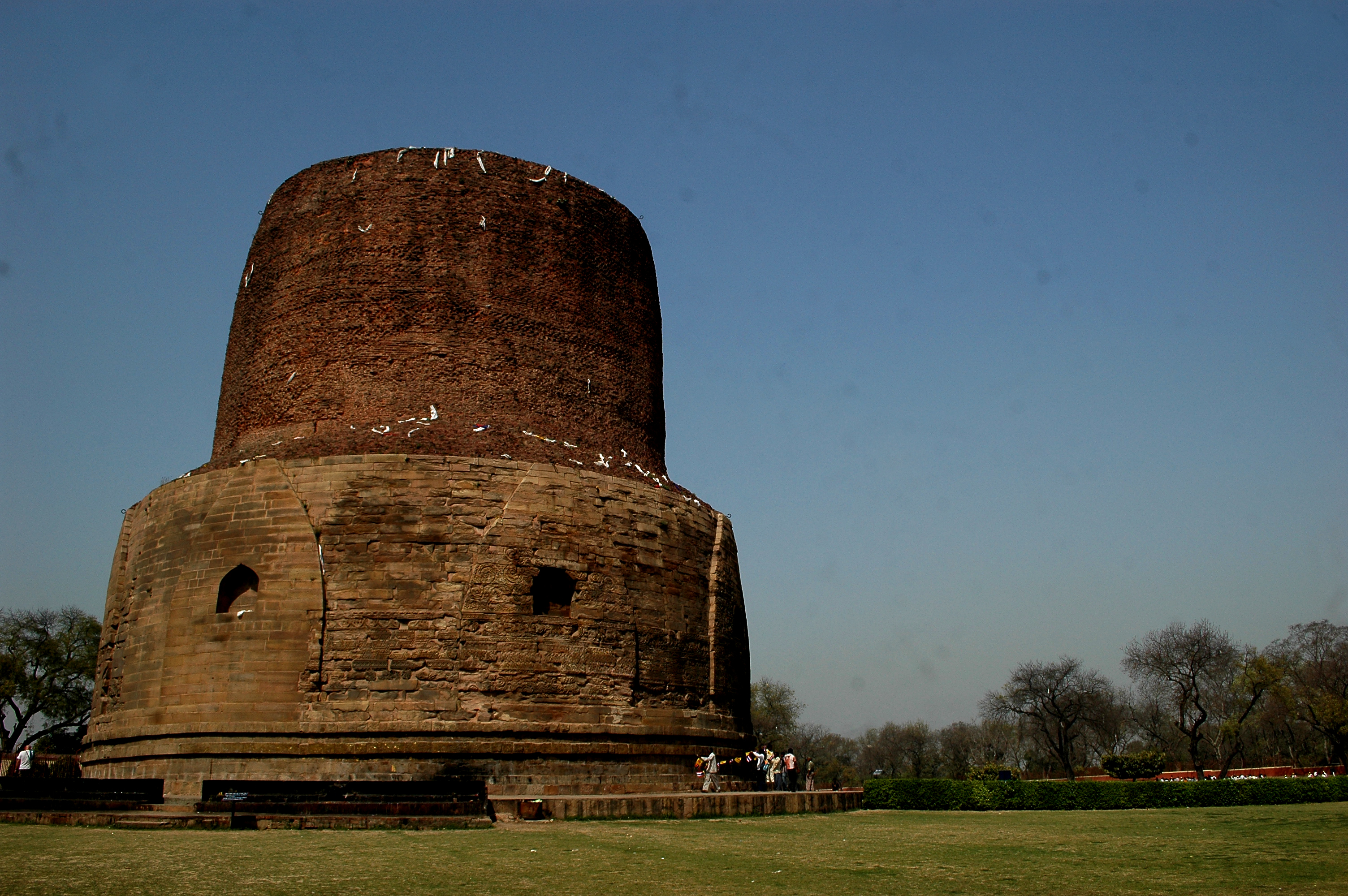
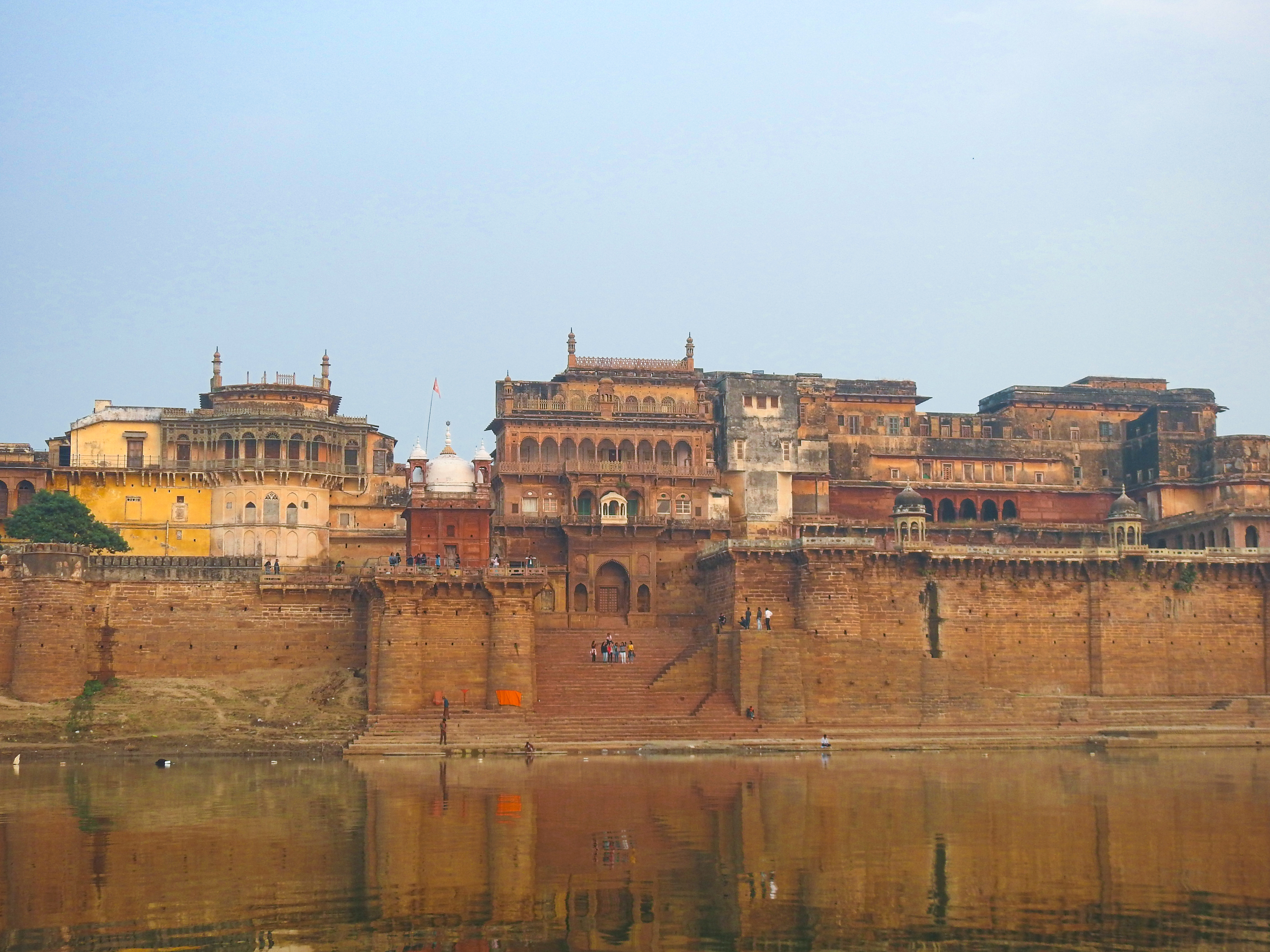
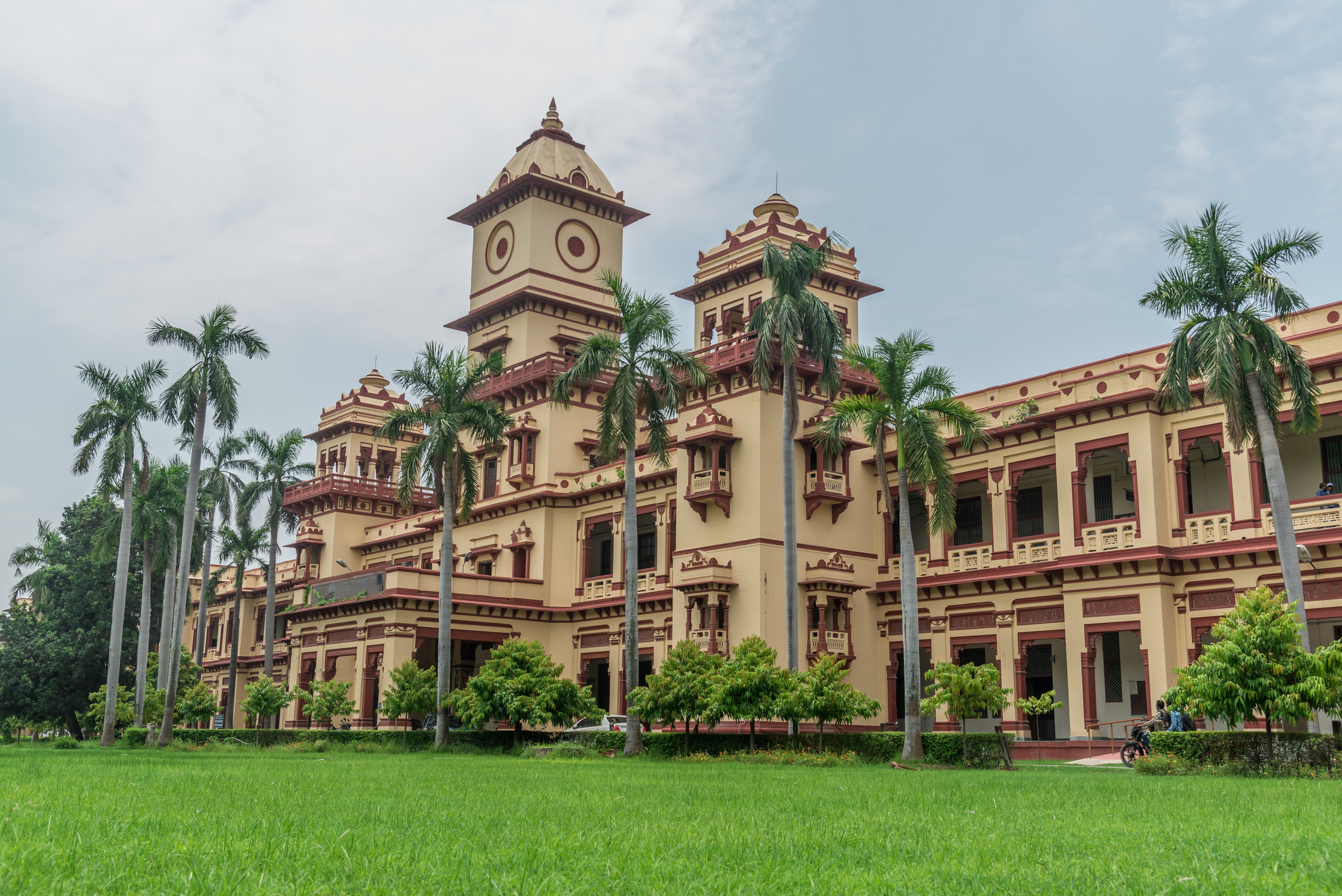
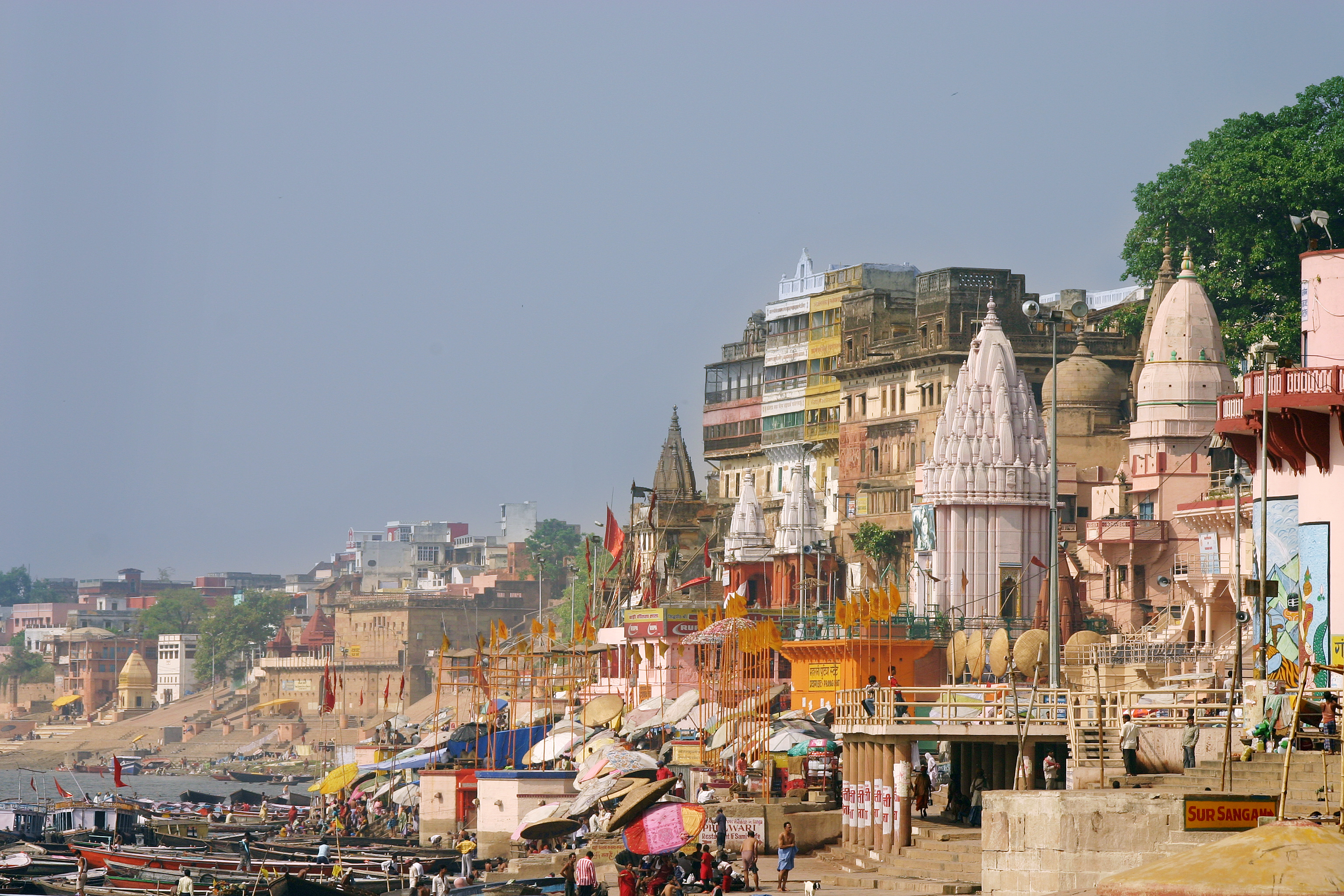
- Clockwise from top-left: Kashi Vishwanath Temple, Dhamek Stupa at Sarnath, Dept of Electrical Engineering at IIT-BHU, Ahilyabai Ghat, Ramnagar Fort

- Location of Varanasi district in Uttar Pradesh
- Coordinates (Varanasi): 25°20′N 83°00′E
- Country: India
- State: Uttar Pradesh
- Division: Varanasi
- Headquarters: Varanasi

Government
  - District Magistrate: Satyendra Kumar, IAS
  - Police Commissioner: Mohit Agarwal, IPS
  - Mayor: Ashok Tiwari, BJP
  - Lok Sabha constituencies: Varanasi
  - Member of Parliament, Lok Sabha: Narendra Modi (Prime Minister of India)

Area
  - Total: 1,535 km^{2} (593 sq mi)

Population (2011)
  - Total: 3,676,841
  - Estimate (2021): 4,110,000
  - Density: 2,395/km^{2} (6,204/sq mi)
  - Urban: 1,597,051 (43.4%)
  - Rural: 2,079,790 (56.6%)

Demographics
  - Literacy: 78.41%
  - Sex ratio: 913

Language
  - Official: Hindi
  - Additional Official: Urdu
  - Regional: Bhojpuri
- Time zone: UTC+05:30 (IST)
- Vehicle registration: UP-65
- Website: Official website

Varanasi district is a district in the Indian state of Uttar Pradesh, with the holy city of Varanasi as the district headquarters. It is also the headquarters of the Varanasi division which contains 4 districts (including Varanasi).

It is surrounded by Mirzapur district, Jaunpur district, Ghazipur district, Chandauli district, and Bhadohi district. The Ganga (Ganges) river flows through the district. Part of the Varanasi division, the district occupies an area of 1,535 square kilometres (593 sq mi) and as of the 2011 Census of India, it had a population of 3,676,841.

== Demographics ==
Historical population
| Year | Pop. | ±% p.a. |
|---|---|---|
| 1853 | 420,822 | — |
| 1865 | 453,414 | +0.62% |
| 1872 | 502,185 | +1.47% |
| 1881 | 554,690 | +1.11% |
| 1891 | 628,380 | +1.26% |
| 1901 | 681,858 | +0.82% |
| 1911 | 685,391 | +0.05% |
| 1921 | 696,188 | +0.16% |
| 1931 | 745,318 | +0.68% |
| 1941 | 884,210 | +1.72% |
| 1951 | 1,047,522 | +1.71% |
| 1961 | 1,241,210 | +1.71% |
| 1971 | 1,514,420 | +2.01% |
| 1981 | 1,919,746 | +2.40% |
| 1991 | 2,508,110 | +2.71% |
| 2001 | 3,138,671 | +2.27% |
| 2011 | 3,676,841 | +1.60% |

Religions in Varanasi district (2011)
| Religion | Percent |
| Hinduism | 84.52% |
| Islam | 14.88% |
| Other or not stated | 0.60% |

According to the 2011 census, Varanasi district has a population of 3,676,841, This gives it a ranking of 75th in India (out of a total of 640). The district has a population density of 2,399 inhabitants per square kilometre (6,210/sq mi). Its population growth rate over the decade 2001–2011 was 17.32%. Varanasi has a sex ratio of 909 females for every 1000 males, and a literacy rate of 77.05%. 43.44% of the population lives in urban areas. Scheduled Castes and Scheduled Tribes make up 13.24% and 0.78% of the population respectively.

=== Languages ===
Languages in Varanasi district (2011)
1. Hindi (76.2%)
2. Bhojpuri (19.7%)
3. Urdu (3.24%)
4. Others (0.89%)

At the time of the 2011 Census of India, 76.19% of the population spoke Hindi, 19.68% Bhojpuri, and 3.24% Urdu as their first language. Bhojpuri is natively spoken in Varanasi.

== Administrative divisions ==
The district is made up of three tehsils: Varanasi, Pindra and Rajatalab. All 3 are headed by a SDM.

These 3 tehsils are divided into 8 Blocks: Arajiline, Baragaon, Chiraigaon, Cholapur, Harhua, Kashividyapeeth, Pindra and Sewapuri.

== Politics ==
There are eight Vidhan Sabha (Legislative Assembly) constituencies: Pindra, Shivpur, Rohaniya, Varanasi North, Varanasi South, Varanasi Cantt., Sevapuri, and Ajagara.

== Education ==
=== Universities ===
- Banaras Hindu University
- Central Institute of Higher Tibetan Studies
- Mahatma Gandhi Kashi Vidyapith
- Sampurnanand Sanskrit Vishwavidyalaya
- Jamia Salafia, Varanasi (The Salafi University Of India)

=== Colleges/Institutes ===
- Indian Institute of Technology (BHU)
- International Rice Research Institute
- DAV Post Graduate College
- National Institute of Fashion Technology (Rae Bareli Extension)
- National School of Drama
- Sunbeam College for Women
- Institute of Medical Sciences - BHU
- Indian Institute of Vegetable Research
- National Seed Research and Training Centre
- Uday Pratap College
- Vasanta College for Women
