= Varanasi tehsil =

Varanasi Tehsil
- Tehsil
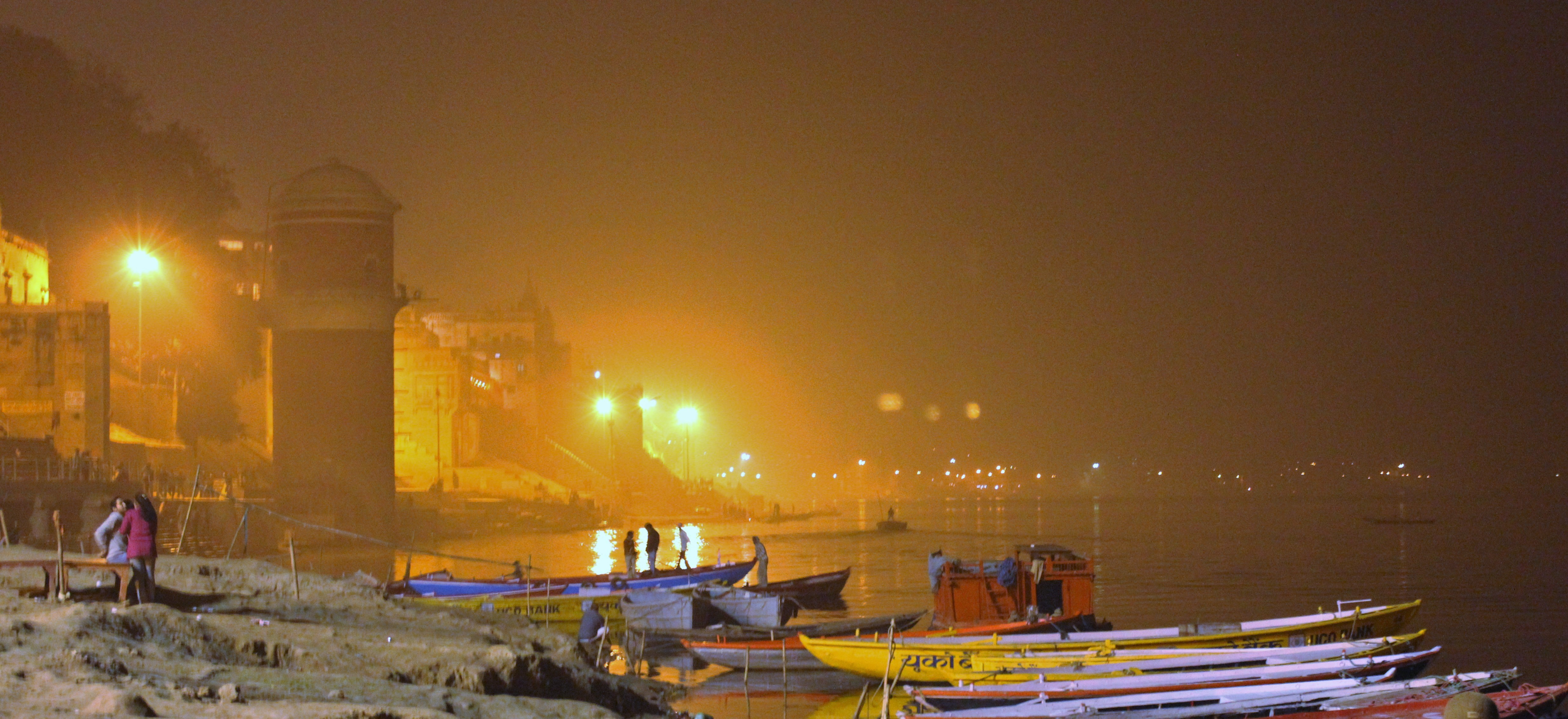
- Ghat in Varanasi

- Tehsil location on map
- Coordinates: 25.351978°N 82.973020°E
- Country: India
- State: Uttar Pradesh
- Elevation: 80 m (260 ft)

Population (2011)
  - Total: 1,585,668

Languages
  - Official: Hindi
- Time zone: UTC+5:30 (IST)
- Postal code: 221XXX
- Telephone code: +91-542
- Vehicle registration: UP65 XXXX
- Sub-district code: 009996
- Lok Sabha constituency: Varanasi
- Vidhan Sabha constituency: Rohaniya; Sevapuri; Varanasi Cantt. Varanasi North; Varanasi South

Varanasi Tehsil is one of three tehsils (sub-districts) in the district of Varanasi in Uttar Pradesh state, India, the other two being Pindra and Raja Talab tehsils. Varanasi tehsil consists of Varanasi city urban and rural areas. It has 38 census towns and 835 villages.

== Census towns ==
Varanasi Tehsil comprises 38 census towns. The biggest census town is Varanasi Municipal Corporation (population of 1,198,491) and smallest is Gaura Kala (population of 4,653). Following is the list of all the towns along with the population as per 2011 census.

1. Varanasi Municipal Corporation : (1,198,491)
2. Ramnagar Nagar Palika Parishad : (49,132)
3. Lohta : (25,596)
4. Phulwaria : (20,466)
5. Shivdaspur : (16,405)
6. Suzabad : (15,384)
7. Kotwa : (14,394)
8. Maruadih Railway Settlement Industrial Township : (14,298)
9. Varanasi Cantonment Board : (14,119)
10. Benipur : (12,470)
11. Chhitpur : (12,156)
12. Kandwa : (11,685)
13. Sir Gobardhan : (11,350)
14. Maruadih : (11,228)
15. Susuwahi : (10,454)
16. Salarpur : (10,126)
17. Birbhanpur : (8,233)
18. Harpal Pur : (7,710)
19. Gangapur : (7,561)
20. Kakarmatta : (7,377)
21. Bhagawanpur : (7,269)
22. Lerhupur : (6,934)
23. Amara Khaira Chak : (6,577)
24. Umarha : (6,429)
25. Chandpur : (6,427)
26. Dindaspur : (6,352)
27. Kallipur : (6,295)
28. Chhitauni : (6,195)
29. Asapur : (6,153)
30. Jalal Patti : (6,033)
31. Kachnar : (5,870)
32. Kotwa : (5,825)
33. Maheshpur : (5,553)
34. Kesaripur : (5,381)
35. Parmanandpur : (5,139)
36. Lahartara : (5,124)
37. Sarai Mohana : (4,824)
38. Gaura Kala : (4,653)

== Villages ==
Varanasi Tehsil has 835 villages. Following is the list of all villages (along with village population as per 2011 Census) in Varanasi tehsil.

| Village Name | Population |
|---|---|
| Adampur | 2,897 |
| Adampur | 2,202 |
| Ahirauli | 1,275 |
| Ahmadpur | 976 |
| Airla | 1,693 |
| Aitha | 2,398 |
| Ajawan | 2,352 |
| Ajor Patti | 889 |
| Akhari | 4,105 |
| Akhileshpur | 4,525 |
| Alauddinpur | 2,728 |
| Allopur | 2,101 |
| Amar Patti | 1,246 |
| Amauli | 3,212 |
| Amaulia | 640 |
| Amini | 5,382 |
| Amripur | 1,050 |
| Amwa | 1,050 |
| Anantpur | 1,140 |
| Appi | 490 |
| Araji Newada | 448 |
| Arajiline | 363 |
| Arazi Chandrawati | 438 |
| Arjunpur | 2,140 |
| Arka Kansriapur | 1,564 |
| Ashar | 945 |
| Aswari | 3,286 |
| Atarsuia | 77 |
| Atarsuiya | 188 |
| Ateshua | 4,301 |
| Aura | 2,187 |
| Aura | 2,553 |
| Awadhipur | 310 |
| Ayar | 5,447 |
| Ayodhyapur | 1,554 |
| Azgara Khas | 7,185 |
| Babatpur | 1,803 |
| Babhaniyav | 1,914 |
| Babhanpura | 2,992 |
| Babua Pur | 218 |
| Bachhawn | 7,775 |
| Badhaini Khurd | 1,988 |
| Badher | 391 |
| Badipur | 1,375 |
| Bahadurpur | 543 |
| Bahadurpur | 1,823 |
| Baherwa | 46 |
| Baherwa | 1,119 |
| Bahlolpur | 820 |
| Bahoranpur | 1,440 |
| Bahra | 1,089 |
| Bahuawn | 156 |
| Baijal Pur | 507 |
| Bairwan | 2,844 |
| Bajardiha | 416 |
| Bakaini | 151 |
| Bakhani | 170 |
| Bakhariya | 2,809 |
| Baksara | 24 |
| Balipur | 846 |
| Balirampur | 815 |
| Balkishunpur | 506 |
| Ballampur | 22 |
| Balua | 1,561 |
| Banauli | 1,246 |
| Bandepur | 3,139 |
| Bandhar Khurd | 319 |
| Bangalipur | 899 |
| Baniyapur | 828 |
| Bankat | 2,276 |
| Bankat | 1,563 |
| Bankat | 1,112 |
| Bansipur | 1,216 |
| Bantari | 1,153 |
| Banwaripur | 764 |
| Bara Dih | 2,983 |
| Baragaon I | 888 |
| Barai | 4,798 |
| Baraura | 2,912 |
| Barema | 1,825 |
| Barhaini Kala | 1,923 |
| Barikhpur | 211 |
| Bariyasanpur | 2,856 |
| Barki | 3,896 |
| Barsara | 597 |
| Barsata | 795 |
| Barthara | 5,194 |
| Barthara Khurd | 4,730 |
| Bartharra Gangwar | 9 |
| Barthauli | 1,058 |
| Barwapur | 717 |
| Barzi | 336 |
| Basant Ptti | 3,283 |
| Basantpur | 136 |
| Basantpur | 475 |
| Basbariya | 508 |
| Basdevpur | 1,099 |
| Basuhan Chak | 600 |
| Baviyaon | 3,068 |
| Bazar Kalika | 1,520 |
| Bela | 2,751 |
| Belauri | 1,739 |
| Belwa | 2,000 |
| Benipur Kala | 1,189 |
| Benipur Khurd | 1,402 |
| Berhauli | 742 |
| Beruka | 1,032 |
| Beshupur | 3,097 |
| Betwar | 2,410 |
| Beyar | 431 |
| Bhabhiyar | 1,534 |
| Bhadarasi | 1,486 |
| Bhadwan | 2,034 |
| Bhadwar | 1,393 |
| Bhaghutipur | 452 |
| Bhagwanpur | 906 |
| Bhagwanpur Khurd | 1,217 |
| Bhandaha Kala | 1,865 |
| Bhanjanpur | 266 |
| Bharaharia | 1,451 |
| Bharaon | 1,740 |
| Bharatpur | 1,337 |
| Bhareha | 699 |
| Bharehara | 260 |
| Bharthara Kala | 3,990 |
| Bhatauli | 1,425 |
| Bhatauli | 1,134 |
| Bhatpurwa Kala | 1,935 |
| Bhatshar | 6,059 |
| Bhatti | 4,148 |
| Bhaudpur | 390 |
| Bhawanipur | 3,887 |
| Bhawanipur | 1,478 |
| Bhawanipur | 1,017 |
| Bhgautipur | 1,138 |
| Bhidur | 1,278 |
| Bhikhampur | 2,011 |
| Bhikhampur | 3,554 |
| Bhikharipur | 2,257 |
| Bhikharipur Kala | 1,538 |
| Bhikharipur Khurd | 373 |
| Bhikhipur | 1,093 |
| Bhimchandi | 1,294 |
| Bhisori | 1,691 |
| Bhitari | 5,137 |
| Bhitkuri | 1,359 |
| Bhitti | 4,004 |
| Bhohar | 3,253 |
| Bhojubeer | 983 |
| Bhor Khurd | 155 |
| Bhorkala | 2,844 |
| Bhualpur | 548 |
| Bhuilaee | 622 |
| Bhullanpur | 6,419 |
| Bhuwalpur | 682 |
| Bibhauri | 439 |
| Biparjepur | 419 |
| Birampur | 549 |
| Birapur | 646 |
| Birbalpur | 874 |
| Birsinghpur | 879 |
| Birsinghpur | 766 |
| Bisokharpur | 1,269 |
| Bisunpur | 2,121 |
| Bisunpura | 1,431 |
| Biththalpur | 792 |
| Blarampur | 2,051 |
| Burapur | 1,767 |
| Chadpur | 3,584 |
| Chahi | 823 |
| Chak Bansdev | 471 |
| Chak Chelawa | 84 |
| Chak Dagrha | 420 |
| Chak Darsan | 82 |
| Chak Ghurdaur | 240 |
| Chak Loaweg | 125 |
| Chak Mataldei | 766 |
| Chakarpanpur | 1,743 |
| Chakatesua | 44 |
| Chakdiha | 4 |
| Chakdiharam | 127 |
| Chaklola | 648 |
| Chamauli | 5,489 |
| Chandapur | 4,860 |
| Chandapur | 2,786 |
| Chandapur | 2,467 |
| Chandrawati | 2,093 |
| Chaubepur Kala | 1,903 |
| Chaubepur Khurd | 1,253 |
| Chaukhandi | 3,325 |
| Chaur | 278 |
| Chhahi | 3,813 |
| Chhateri Manapur | 5,494 |
| Chhatripur | 758 |
| Chhitampur | 1,982 |
| Chhitauni | 1,587 |
| Chhitauni | 5,011 |
| Chhitauni | 2,221 |
| Chintapur | 670 |
| Chiraigaon | 4,806 |
| Chitaipur | 1,341 |
| Chitarsenpur | 3,946 |
| Cholapur | 2,913 |
| Chukha | 2,030 |
| Chukhepur | 1,893 |
| Chumkuni | 962 |
| Chunarpur | 707 |
| Churamanpur | 4,069 |
| Coraut | 2,265 |
| Dabethuwa | 757 |
| Dafalpur | 890 |
| Dafi | 5,672 |
| Daghariya | 1,733 |
| Dalpattipur | 244 |
| Damodarpur | 1,359 |
| Dandoopur | 728 |
| Dandupur | 3,069 |
| Daniyalpur | 3,449 |
| Daniyalpur | 1,310 |
| Darberupur | 286 |
| Darekhu | 5,350 |
| Dashrathpur | 912 |
| Daudpur | 1,085 |
| Daudpur | 1,375 |
| Daulatiya | 885 |
| Dayapur | 1,362 |
| Dayapur | 354 |
| Deipur | 3,719 |
| Deipur | 1,792 |
| Delhana | 2,547 |
| Demrupur | 521 |
| Deorai | 701 |
| Deoriya | 260 |
| Deuara | 2,023 |
| Deura Chak | 470 |
| Devnandpur | 387 |
| Devopalpur | 237 |
| Dewapur Kala | 193 |
| Dewariya | 58 |
| Dhadhorpur | 1,851 |
| Dhakhawa | 1,719 |
| Dhananjaipur | 304 |
| Dhanapur | 1,581 |
| Dhannipur | 5,229 |
| Dhanpalpur | 1,031 |
| Dharadhar | 281 |
| Dharampur | 360 |
| Dharmalpur | 581 |
| Dharsauna | 5,707 |
| Dhaurhara | 15,736 |
| Dherahi | 918 |
| Dhobahi | 1,092 |
| Dholapur | 1,045 |
| Dhoraee | 85 |
| Dhuripur | 1,053 |
| Dihwa | 1,498 |
| Dilavalpur | 2,134 |
| Dinapur | 4,057 |
| Dipapur | 2,098 |
| Domaila | 2,533 |
| Domanpur | 837 |
| Domari | 4,924 |
| Dubepur | 526 |
| Dubkiya | 1,919 |
| Duduhan | 3,295 |
| Dulhanpur | 544 |
| Dumitwan | 449 |
| Ekdanga | 273 |
| Etwa | 300 |
| Faridpur | 1,351 |
| Faridpur | 1,175 |
| Foolpur | 1,861 |
| Gaddopur | 809 |
| Gahani | 1,927 |
| Gaharpur | 479 |
| Gaharpur | 820 |
| Gairaha | 1,041 |
| Gajadharpur | 2,417 |
| Gajapur | 1,714 |
| Gajapur | 724 |
| Gajari | 5,207 |
| Gajepur | 1,706 |
| Ganeshpur | 3,315 |
| Ganeshpur | 559 |
| Ganeshpur | 2,068 |
| Gangapur | 659 |
| Gangpur | 1,155 |
| Garsara | 3,073 |
| Garthauli | 4,187 |
| Gaur Madhukar Shahpur | 9,077 |
| Gaura Gangwar | 14 |
| Gaura Khurd | 15 |
| Gaurapurwar | 3,935 |
| Gaurdiha | 905 |
| Ghamahapur | 1,556 |
| Ghamhapur | 1,899 |
| Ghamhapur | 143 |
| Ghatmpur | 1,100 |
| Ghosila | 1,172 |
| Girdharpur | 936 |
| Gobindpur | 1,240 |
| Gobindpur | 966 |
| Gobindpur | 2,665 |
| Gobrha | 3,473 |
| Gogawa | 652 |
| Goithaha | 3,079 |
| Gokulpur | 219 |
| Gola | 1,394 |
| Gopal Pur | 165 |
| Gopalpur | 840 |
| Gopipur | 250 |
| Goppur | 3,878 |
| Goppur | 137 |
| Gora | 1,926 |
| Gorai | 2,161 |
| Gosai Pur | 602 |
| Gosaipur(Chhota) | 75 |
| Gosaipur Mohaon | 8,205 |
| Gosaipur Pathkhuli | 1,493 |
| Govindpur | 162 |
| Guria | 2,484 |
| Gurudaspur | 914 |
| Gurwat | 1,793 |
| Hajipur | 2,396 |
| Handiyadih | 3,438 |
| Har Ballabhpur | 1,616 |
| Harbanspur | 23 |
| Harbhampur | 1,549 |
| Hardaspur | 269 |
| Hardattpur | 3,580 |
| Haridasipur | 2,256 |
| Harihar Pur | 903 |
| Hariharpur | 1,320 |
| Hariharpur | 871 |
| Harnampur | 457 |
| Harpur | 2,882 |
| Harsos | 9,390 |
| Hasanpur | 487 |
| Hasapur | 701 |
| Hasimpur | 2,705 |
| Hathi | 5,266 |
| Hathiyar Kala | 965 |
| Hathiyar Khurd | 702 |
| Hatiya | 2,446 |
| Hinttapur | 547 |
| Hiramanpur | 3,959 |
| Hirampur | 886 |
| Hirapur | 377 |
| Hirdahipur | 2,245 |
| Holapur | 1,854 |
| Hulasipur | 63 |
| Husepur | 145 |
| Imiliya | 876 |
| Isharwar | 1,412 |
| Jaddupur | 741 |
| Jaga Patti | 1,171 |
| Jagama | 4 |
| Jagardeopur | 1,361 |
| Jagati Pur | 875 |
| Jagatpur | 2,342 |
| Jagdeeshpur | 4,189 |
| Jagdishpur | 417 |
| Jagsipur | 56 |
| Jairampur | 5,046 |
| Jakhini | 3,754 |
| Jalalpur | 1,733 |
| Jalhupur | 7,052 |
| Jameen Kardhana | 269 |
| Jameen Shivsagar | 70 |
| Jamin Bairvan | 596 |
| Jamin Kaneri | 613 |
| Jamin Kushi Kaitthak | 31 |
| Jammanpur | 229 |
| Jamunipur | 601 |
| Jamunipur | 1,160 |
| Jansa | 4,337 |
| Jariyari | 1,511 |
| Jayapur | 2,974 |
| Jeetapur | 803 |
| Jhabra | 779 |
| Jhanjhupur | 740 |
| Jigana | 48 |
| Jiyaram Pur | 208 |
| Jogapur | 1,065 |
| Jogiyapur | 801 |
| Jugar Patti | 1,136 |
| Kachhariya | 1,812 |
| Kadipur | 1,871 |
| Kadipur | 1,416 |
| Kadipur Khurd | 2,080 |
| Kadipur Khurd | 1,083 |
| Kaithi | 5,903 |
| Kaithor | 1,128 |
| Kaji Chak | 467 |
| Kakalpur | 1,312 |
| Kakarahiya | 1,099 |
| Kalyanpur | 237 |
| Kama Pur | 108 |
| Kamalahan | 426 |
| Kamalpur | 465 |
| Kanchanpur | 5,100 |
| Kaneri | 1,994 |
| Kanhipur | 40 |
| Kankpur | 1,149 |
| Kanthipur | 1,182 |
| Kanudih | 2,622 |
| Kapar Phorwa | 4,660 |
| Kapsa | 1,681 |
| Kapsethi | 2,466 |
| Karaundi | 7,271 |
| Kardhana | 11,255 |
| Karia | 585 |
| Karma | 694 |
| Karmsipur | 208 |
| Karnadadi | 3,444 |
| Karsara | 4,554 |
| Kashipur | 1,254 |
| Kasipur | 1,514 |
| Katari | 5,333 |
| Katesar Kala | 375 |
| Katwaru Pur | 776 |
| Kauwapur | 1,758 |
| Kerakatpur | 2,851 |
| Ketesar Khurd | 117 |
| Kevtan | 691 |
| Khajuhi | 558 |
| Khajuri | 4,410 |
| Khalilpur | 455 |
| Khalispur | 3,657 |
| Khalispur | 2,892 |
| Khamauna | 905 |
| Khandakh | 998 |
| Khanpur | 1,574 |
| Khanuan | 1,081 |
| Khanwa | 2,663 |
| Kharag Rampur | 1,858 |
| Kharagaipur | 1,742 |
| Kharagraipur | 621 |
| Kharaura | 359 |
| Khardaha | 1,793 |
| Khargu Pur | 2,531 |
| Khemaipur | 921 |
| Khemapur | 1,909 |
| Khetalpur | 965 |
| Khewali | 3,352 |
| Khewasipur | 1,295 |
| Khillupura | 628 |
| Khochwa | 2,413 |
| Khulaspur | 1,065 |
| Khusipur | 1,447 |
| Khutha | 797 |
| Khuthan | 1,721 |
| Kinnupur | 175 |
| Kodopur | 1,399 |
| Kodopur Khurd | 305 |
| Kohasi | 2,062 |
| Koila | 213 |
| Koilo | 504 |
| Koilo Urf Kishun Duttpur | 1,015 |
| Kori | 959 |
| Kosara | 586 |
| Kukraha | 2,358 |
| Kundriya | 2,713 |
| Kurauana Urf Rameshwar | 1,749 |
| Kurauli | 316 |
| Kurauli | 1,601 |
| Kurauna | 2,988 |
| Kurauti | 1,248 |
| Kurhua | 2,299 |
| Kursato | 1,405 |
| Kursiyan | 678 |
| Kutubpur | 150 |
| Lachapur | 2,051 |
| Lachhimanpur | 692 |
| Lachhipur | 706 |
| Lachhipur Kurouna | 700 |
| Lachmisenpur | 881 |
| Lahiya | 576 |
| Lakhanipur | 1,516 |
| Lakhanpur | 1,669 |
| Lakhanpur | 2,633 |
| Lakhansenpur | 1,575 |
| Lakhi | 1,006 |
| Lallapur | 741 |
| Lalmankot | 886 |
| Lalpur | 7,864 |
| Lalpur | 1,442 |
| Lamhi | 1,841 |
| Laskariya | 466 |
| Laskarpur | 2,343 |
| Latauni | 2,524 |
| Lathiya | 2,082 |
| Laxirampur | 608 |
| Lenuwayi | 1,219 |
| Lohagazar | 435 |
| Lohara Dih | 2,733 |
| Loharapur | 1,571 |
| Looth Kala | 735 |
| Looth Khurd | 641 |
| Lorhan | 2,572 |
| Madhopur | 217 |
| Madhopur | 1,291 |
| Madhukar Shahpur | 806 |
| Magrahua | 2,031 |
| Mahaban | 883 |
| Mahada | 1,461 |
| Mahagipur | 2,205 |
| Mahamudpur | 5,794 |
| Mahesh Pur | 22 |
| Maheshpur | 720 |
| Maheshpur | 39 |
| Mahgoan | 5,113 |
| Mahmdpur | 2,258 |
| Mahmoodpur | 2,752 |
| Mahrajpur | 1,658 |
| Majhiyarpur | 789 |
| Majhmitia | 604 |
| Mangalpur | 3,393 |
| Mangolepur | 1,833 |
| Manikpur | 151 |
| Maniyari Pur | 1,541 |
| Maniyari Pur | 1,510 |
| Manorathpur | 821 |
| Manrauli | 7,788 |
| Marawan | 4,826 |
| Marcha Chak | 46 |
| Marhawa | 3,302 |
| Marhni | 1,721 |
| Mariya | 886 |
| Marui | 5,413 |
| Matuka | 3,659 |
| Mawaiya | 2,513 |
| Mechkanpur | 219 |
| Mehadiganj | 8,134 |
| Milkapur | 1,948 |
| Milki Chack | 2,843 |
| Milki Chak | 1,137 |
| Milki Pachai | 364 |
| Milkipur | 932 |
| Mirapur | 393 |
| Mirawan | 851 |
| Mirchia | 3 |
| Mishirpur | 2,845 |
| Misripura | 2,483 |
| Modhopur | 34 |
| Moglabir | 1,793 |
| Mohandas Pur | 1,138 |
| Mohanidih | 1,004 |
| Mokalpur | 3,141 |
| Mokarwan | 422 |
| Molanapur | 1,777 |
| Mubarakpur | 1,614 |
| Mudli | 432 |
| Mugdarpur | 619 |
| Munari | 5,924 |
| Mungawar | 1,229 |
| Muradev | 3,344 |
| Murdaha | 3,170 |
| Mureri | 705 |
| Muridpur | 1,197 |
| Murli | 1,219 |
m
| Mustafabad | 8,361 |
| Nabbe Chak | 40 |
| Nagaipur | 474 |
| Nagepur | 2,796 |
| Naipur Kala | 4,418 |
| Naipura Khurd | 180 |
| Nakain | 972 |
| Nakhwan | 77 |
| Naktuwa | 292 |
| Naraicha | 995 |
| Narayanpur | 7,517 |
| Narayanpur | 305 |
| Narottampur Kala | 3,331 |
| Narottampur Khurd | 620 |
| Narottmpur | 933 |
| Narpatpur | 3,170 |
| Narsara | 2,840 |
| Narur | 1,551 |
| Nasiripur | 5,241 |
| Nathaipur | 4 |
| Nathanpur | 49 |
| Nathupur | 3,125 |
| Nawalpur | 178 |
| Nawalsha Cot | 291 |
| Nawapur | 2,457 |
| Nayapur | 969 |
| Nayapura | 578 |
| Neema | 344 |
| Newada | 1,008 |
| Newada | 3,026 |
| Newada | 486 |
| Newada Khas | 2,206 |
| Newriya | 1,288 |
| Nibiya | 24 |
| Nidaura | 502 |
| Nighaura | 596 |
| Nimani | 737 |
| Niyaisipur | 555 |
| Niyardiha | 3,863 |
| Nohanipur | 3,538 |
| Nonkharan | 885 |
| Nuawn | 3,417 |
| Odarha | 1,096 |
| Pachai | 895 |
| Pachai | 50 |
| Pacharon | 4,534 |
| Pachwar | 2,203 |
| Pahari | 4,841 |
| Paharpur | 2,781 |
| Pahriya | 1,232 |
| Paidegaon | 450 |
| Palahi Patti | 2,516 |
| Palkanhh | 1,076 |
| Pandepur | 183 |
| Panditpur | 10 |
| Panditpur | 1,664 |
| Panihari | 1,504 |
| Paniyara | 1,921 |
| Paragdih | 1,370 |
| Parampur | 1,800 |
| Parana Patti | 2,401 |
| Paranapur | 1,038 |
| Paranapur | 1,758 |
| Parjanpur | 2,644 |
| Parmanandpur | 2,402 |
| Parmanandpur | 1,180 |
| Parsi Pur | 698 |
| Parsottampur | 83 |
| Parsuchak | 1,204 |
| Parwatpur | 315 |
| Paterwa | 2,735 |
| Patkhauli | 356 |
| Patre Chak | 596 |
| Pauha | 155 |
| Pausi | 207 |
| Payagpur | 997 |
| Peduka | 637 |
| Phakirpur | 380 |
| Pilkhani | 997 |
| Pilori | 2,652 |
| Pipri | 1,005 |
| Pisaur | 5,332 |
| Piyri | 2,181 |
| Pogalpur | 708 |
| Prahladpur | 743 |
| Pratap Patti | 31 |
| Pratappur | 3,662 |
| Prithvipur | 278 |
| Pura Bariyar | 1,267 |
| Pura Ghurshah | 1,093 |
| Pura Majhola | 346 |
| Puran Patti | 1,454 |
| Purananda | 975 |
| Purandarpur | 1,227 |
| Puraraiji | 68 |
| Purashiv | 340 |
| Pure | 5,939 |
| Raghunathpur | 2,036 |
| Raghunathpur | 2,495 |
| Raimala | 1,289 |
| Raipura | 36 |
| Raipura | 2,339 |
| Raishipur Sattanpur | 826 |
| Rajapur | 501 |
| Rajapur | 1,132 |
| Rajapur | 2,502 |
| Rajjipur | 413 |
| Rajnahiya | 1,332 |
| Rajpur | 797 |
| Rajwari | 5,233 |
| Rakhauna | 3,765 |
| Rakhi | 616 |
| Rakhi Sattanpur | 346 |
| Ram Datt Pur | 235 |
| Ram Kishun Pur | 19 |
| Ramagharwan | 1,468 |
| Ramaipur | 202 |
| Ramchandipur | 4,480 |
| Ramdat Pur | 4,478 |
| Ramdatha | 414 |
| Ramdih | 1,525 |
| Ramgaon | 2,009 |
| Ramna | 3,306 |
| Ramna | 8,651 |
| Ramnisf | 586 |
| Rampur | 1,406 |
| Rampur | 1,026 |
| Rampur | 679 |
| Rampur | 890 |
| Rampur | 784 |
| Rampur Chandrawati | 2,017 |
| Rampur Mutllike | 572 |
| Rampur Mutllike Shattanpur | 305 |
| Rampur Raisipur | 2,518 |
| Ramraypur | 1,128 |
| Ramshipur | 2,039 |
| Ramsinghpur | 774 |
| Ranibazar | 1,811 |
| Rasara | 1,163 |
| Rashulpur | 1,603 |
| Rasulaha | 1,401 |
| Rasulgarh | 4,065 |
| Rasulpur | 117 |
| Ratan Pur | 84 |
| Rauna Kala | 2,263 |
| Rauna Khurd | 7,000 |
| Razala | 997 |
| Roopchandpur | 2,105 |
| Rupapur | 2,115 |
| Rustampur | 4,932 |
| Sabhaipur | 363 |
| Sadalpur | 1,373 |
| Saee | 1,060 |
| Sahabajpura | 821 |
| Sahansapur | 6,674 |
| Sahawabad | 1,631 |
| Sajoi | 7,059 |
| Sakalpur | 2,006 |
| Salhupur | 393 |
| Sandaha | 5,014 |
| Sapsaul | 2,267 |
| Sarai Dangari Kala | 3,627 |
| Sarai Dangari Khurd | 249 |
| Saraimohan | 2,837 |
| Saraiya | 543 |
| Saraiya | 626 |
| Saraiya | 1,322 |
| Saraiya | 1,542 |
| Saraiya I | 1,365 |
| Saraiya II | 3,009 |
| Sarang Pur | 1,171 |
| Sarauni | 2,169 |
| Sarhari | 2,283 |
| Sarswan | 2,558 |
| Satahara | 153 |
| Sathawan | 3,317 |
| Sato | 704 |
| Sattanpur | 2,752 |
| Savhat | 1,899 |
| Sehwar | 1,518 |
| Serwanpur | 2,223 |
| Shahdeeh | 1,260 |
| Shahpur | 1,342 |
| Shaktiyarpur | 170 |
| Shambhu Pur | 541 |
| Shankarpur | 3,527 |
| Sheodas Uparwar | 3,022 |
| Sheorampur | 995 |
| Shihorwa | 3,168 |
| Shivbon | 4,525 |
| Shivdas Pur | 283 |
| Shivdaspur | 460 |
| Shivrampur | 3,920 |
| Shpehata | 453 |
| Sikhari | 1,228 |
| Singhai | 1,554 |
| Singhpur | 2,041 |
| Singhpur | 1,509 |
| Sinhorwa | 1,473 |
| Sirhira | 1,811 |
| Sirsa | 1,064 |
| Sonbarsa | 1,501 |
| Sonbarsa | 2,393 |
| Soyepur | 3,233 |
| Srikanthpur | 1,883 |
| Srithi | 2,324 |
| Suari | 2,004 |
| Sugulpur | 2,115 |
| Suichak | 1,938 |
| Suilara | 811 |
| Sulemapur | 2,118 |
| Sultanipur | 1,170 |
| Sultanpur | 2,060 |
| Sultanpur | 3,012 |
| Sumerapur | 223 |
| Surhi | 1,372 |
| Tala | 2,519 |
| Talhua | 132 |
| Tamachabad | 981 |
| Tara Pur | 216 |
| Taraon | 767 |
| Tarapur | 1,756 |
| Tarapur | 702 |
| Taraya | 2,132 |
| Tari | 1,998 |
| Tariya | 643 |
| Tariya | 2,073 |
| Tarna | 1,241 |
| Tarsawn | 612 |
| Tatehara | 577 |
| Tatepur | 2,349 |
| Tekari | 1,340 |
| Tekariya | 349 |
| Tekipur | 16 |
| Tekuri | 779 |
| Telari | 163 |
| Tendui | 4,496 |
| Tengara | 815 |
| Tewar | 6,452 |
| Thatheharapur | 24 |
| Thatra | 9,775 |
| Thekaha | 272 |
| Therauta | 4,069 |
| Tikari | 5,431 |
| Tilamapur | 3,164 |
| Tilanga | 304 |
| Tilmapur | 1,251 |
| Tinkerawa | 480 |
| Tisaura | 2,318 |
| Tiwari Pur | 376 |
| Todarpur | 2,975 |
| Todarpur | 1,125 |
| Tofapur | 2,032 |
| Tohaphapur | 334 |
| Tribhuvanpur | 80 |
| Tulachak | 494 |
| Tulapur | 39 |
| Uchgoan | 4,402 |
| Udairajpur | 1,172 |
| Udaypur | 1,470 |
| Udho Rampur | 2,391 |
| Ugapur | 2,145 |
| Ukthi | 4,010 |
| Upadhyaypur | 145 |
| Uparwar | 1,845 |
| Urawan | 523 |
| Varani | 2,052 |
| Vihana | 5,413 |
| Vikapur | 1,268 |
| Vinathipur | 649 |
| Vyaspur | 781 |
| Vyaspur | 536 |
| Zafarabad | 1,328 |

== Climate ==
Climate data for Varanasi Tehsil
| Month | Jan | Feb | Mar | Apr | May | Jun | Jul | Aug | Sep | Oct | Nov | Dec | Year |
|---|---|---|---|---|---|---|---|---|---|---|---|---|---|
| Mean daily maximum °C (°F) | 18 (64) | 19 (66) | 20 (68) | 27 (81) | 22 (72) | 20 (68) | 20 (68) | 23 (73) | 20 (68) | 29 (84) | 24 (75) | 22 (72) | 22 (72) |
| Mean daily minimum °C (°F) | 13 (55) | 13 (55) | 13 (55) | 20 (68) | 19 (66) | 20 (68) | 16 (61) | 13 (55) | 18 (64) | 24 (75) | 19 (66) | 17 (63) | 17 (63) |
| Average precipitation mm (inches) | 0.0 (0.0) | 18 (0.7) | 9 (0.4) | 0 (0) | 0 (0) | 96 (3.8) | 144 (5.7) | 162 (6.4) | 201 (7.9) | 24 (0.9) | 0 (0) | 6 (0.2) | 660 (26) |
Source: World Weather Online

== See also ==
- Pindra
- Varanasi
