= Harpal =

Harpal is a given name. Notable people with the name include:

- Harpal Brar (1939–2025), Indian communist politician, writer and businessman, based in Britain
- Harpal Singh Cheema, Aam Aadmi Party MLA from Dirba Assembly Constituency in Sangrur District, Punjab
- Preet Harpal, Punjabi singer songwriter and actor from Punjab, India
- Harpal Kumar (born 1965), the chief executive officer of Cancer Research UK until June 2018
- Harpal Singh Panwar (born 1945), Indian politician
- Harpal Singh Sathi, leader of the Bharatiya Janata Party from Uttarakhand
- Harpal Singh (born 1981), English former professional footballer
- Harpal Singh (field hockey) (born 1983), former Indian field hockey player
- Harpal Singh Sokhi, celebrity chef from India
- Harpal Talhan, retired Canadian lightweight boxer
- Harpal Tiwana (1935–2002), Punjabi playwright
- Harpal Zala, Indian cricketer

== See also ==
- Chour Harpal, old part of Rawalpindi Cantonment
- Raja Harpal, Pakistan, village in Sialkot District, Punjab, Pakistan
- Harpal Pur, census town & village in Varanasi district in the Indian state of Uttar Pradesh
- Har Pal
- Haripal
- Harpalini
- Harpalion
- Harpalpur
- Harpalus
- Harpalyce (disambiguation)
