= Suzabad =

- Census town
- Census town location on Varanasi district map Suzabad (Uttar Pradesh) Suzabad (India)
- Coordinates: 25.319266°N 83.034795°E
- Country: India
- State: Uttar Pradesh
- District: Varanasi district
- Tehsil: Varanasi tehsil
- Elevation: 72.161 m (236.75 ft)

Population (2011)
  - Total: 15,384

Languages
  - Official: Hindi, English
- Time zone: UTC+5:30 (IST)
- Postal code: 221008
- Telephone code: +91-542
- Vehicle registration: UP65 XXXX
- Census town code: 209754
- Lok Sabha constituency: Varanasi (Lok Sabha constituency)
- Vidhan Sabha constituency: Varanasi South

Suzabad is a census town in Varanasi tehsil of Varanasi district in the Indian state of Uttar Pradesh. The census town falls under the Sujabad gram panchayat. Suzabad is about 7 kilometers South-East of Varanasi railway station, 330 kilometers South-East of Lucknow and 7 kilometers North of Ramnagar Fort.

== Demography ==
Suzabad has 2,514 families with a total population of 15,384. Sex ratio of the census town is 867 and child sex ratio is 903. Uttar Pradesh state average for both ratios is 912 and 902 respectively ^{[note]}.

Details	Male	Female	Total	Comments
Number of houses	-	-	2514	(census 2011)
Adult	8,239	7,145	13,101	(census 2011)
Children	-	-	2,283	(census 2011)
Total population	-	-	15,384	(census 2011)
Literacy	76.7%	58.9%	68.4%	(census 2011)

== Transportation ==
Suzabad is connected by air (Lal Bahadur Shastri Airport), by train (Kashi railway station) and by road. Nearest operational airports is Lal Bahadur Shastri Airport and nearest operational railway station is Kashi railway station (27 and 2 kilometers respectively from Suzabad).

== See also ==
- Varanasi tehsil
- Varanasi district
- Varanasi South
- Varanasi (Lok Sabha constituency)

== Notes ==
- All demographic data is based on 2011 Census of India.
