= Bhagawanpur, Varanasi =

Bhagawanpur
- Census town
- Location on Varanasi district map Bhagawanpur (Uttar Pradesh) Bhagawanpur (India)
- Coordinates: 25.270971°N 83.008841°E
- Country: India
- State: Uttar Pradesh
- District: Varanasi district
- Tehsil: Varanasi tehsil
- Elevation: 74.518 m (244.48 ft)

Population (2011)
  - Total: 7,269

Languages
  - Official: Hindi & English
- Time zone: UTC+5:30 (IST)
- Postal code: 221005
- Telephone code: +91-542
- Vehicle registration: UP65 XXXX
- Census town & village code: 209746
- Lok Sabha constituency: Varanasi (Lok Sabha constituency)
- Vidhan Sabha constituency: Varanasi Cantt.

Bhagawanpur is a census town in Varanasi tehsil of Varanasi district in the Indian state of Uttar Pradesh. The census town and village falls under the Gourdih gram panchayat. Bhagawanpur Census town and village is about 11 kilometers southeast of Varanasi railway station, 324 kilometers southeast of Lucknow and 1.5 kilometers southeast of Banaras Hindu University.

== Demography ==
Bhagawanpur has 1,232 families with a total population of 7,269. Sex ratio of the census town and village is 915 and child sex ratio is 714. Uttar Pradesh state average for both ratios is 912 and 902 respectively ^{[note]}.

Details	Male	Female	Total	Comments
Number of houses	–	–	1,232	(census 2011)
Adult	3,796	3,473	6,628	(census 2011)
Children	–	–	641	(census 2011)
Total population	–	–	7,269	(census 2011)
Literacy	94.9%	85.7%	90.5%	(census 2011)

== Transportation ==
Bhagawanpur is connected by air (Lal Bahadur Shastri Airport), by train (Varanasi railway station) and by road. Nearest operational airports is Lal Bahadur Shastri Airport and nearest operational railway station is Varanasi railway station (30 and 11 kilometers respectively from Bhagawanpur).

== See also ==
- Varanasi Cantt.
- Varanasi district
- Varanasi (Lok Sabha constituency)
- Varanasi tehsil

== Notes ==
- All demographic data is based on 2011 Census of India.
