= Maruadih =

- Census town
- Census town location on Varanasi district map Maruadih (Uttar Pradesh) Maruadih (India)
- Coordinates: 25.298138°N 82.962254°E
- Country: India
- State: Uttar Pradesh
- District: Varanasi district
- Tehsil: Varanasi tehsil
- Elevation: 81 m (266 ft)

Population (2011)
  - Total: 14,298

Languages
  - Official: Hindi & English
- Time zone: UTC+5:30 (IST)
- Postal code: 221010
- Telephone code: +91-542
- Vehicle registration: UP65 XXXX
- Census town code: 801234
- Lok Sabha constituency: Varanasi (Lok Sabha constituency)
- Vidhan Sabha constituency: Varanasi Cantt.

Maruadih is a census town in Varanasi tehsil of Varanasi district in the Indian state of Uttar Pradesh. The census town falls under the Mhamudpur gram panchayat. Maruadih is about 4 kilometers South-West of Varanasi railway station, 319 kilometers South-East of Lucknow and 4 kilometers West of Dashashwamedh Ghat.

== Demography ==
Maruadih has 3284 families with a total population of 14,298. Sex ratio of the census town is 894 and child sex ratio is 818. Uttar Pradesh state average for both ratios is 912 and 902 respectively ^{[note]}.

Details	Male	Female	Total	Comments
Number of houses	-	-	3,284	(census 2011)
Adult	7,548	6,750	12,524	(census 2011)
Children	-	-	1,774	(census 2011)
Total population	-	-	14,298	(census 2011)
Literacy	97.6%	89.2%	93.6%	(census 2011)

== Transportation ==
Maruadih is connected by air (Lal Bahadur Shastri Airport), by train (Manduadih railway station) and by road. Nearest operational airports is Lal Bahadur Shastri Airport and nearest operational railway station is Manduadih railway station (26 and 1 kilometers respectively from Maruadih).

== See also ==
- Varanasi Cantt.
- Varanasi (Lok Sabha constituency)

== Notes ==
- All demographic data is based on 2011 Census of India.
