= Sir Gobardhan =

Seer Gobardhan
- Census town
- Sir Gobardhan
- Census town location on Varanasi district map Seer Gobardhan (Uttar Pradesh) Seer Gobardhan (India)
- Coordinates: 25.254812°N 82.997126°E
- Country: India
- State: Uttar Pradesh
- District: Varanasi district
- Tehsil: Varanasi tehsil
- Elevation: 81.971 m (268.93 ft)

Population (2011)
  - Total: 11,350

Languages
  - Official: Hindi & English
- Time zone: UTC+5:30 (IST)
- Postal code: 221011
- Telephone code: +91-542
- Vehicle registration: UP65 XXXX
- Census town code: 209744
- Lok Sabha constituency: Varanasi (Lok Sabha constituency)
- Vidhan Sabha constituency: Varanasi Cantt.

Sir Gobardhan (or Seer Govardhan) is a census town in Varanasi tehsil of Varanasi district in the Indian state of Uttar Pradesh. The census town & village falls under the Shir Goverdhanpur gram panchayat. Sir Gobardhan Census town & village is about 13 kilometers South of Varanasi railway station, 323 kilometers South-East of Lucknow and 3.5 kilometers South-East of Banaras Hindu University main gate. It is of historical significance as it is birthplace of Sant Sri Guru Ravidas. Shri Guru Ravidass Janam Asthan at Seer Goverdhanpur is main pilgrimage place for Ravidasis worldwide.

== Demography ==
Sir Gobardhan has families with a total population of 11,350. Sex ratio of the census town is 875 and child sex ratio is 914. Uttar Pradesh state average for both ratios is 912 and 902 respectively.^{[note]}

| Details | Male | Female | Total | Comments |
|---|---|---|---|---|
| Number of houses | - | - | 1,708 | (census 2011) |
| Adult | 6,053 | 5,297 | 9,719 | (census 2011) |
| Children | - | - | 1631 | (census 2011) |
| Total population | - | - | 11,350 | (census 2011) |
| Literacy | 88.8% | 68.6% | 79.4% | (census 2011) |

== Transportation ==
Sir Gobardhan is connected by air (Lal Bahadur Shastri Airport), by train (Varanasi City railway station) and by road transport. Nearest operational airports is Lal Bahadur Shastri Airport and nearest operational railway station is Varanasi City railway station (40 and 13 kilometers respectively from Sir Gobardhan).

== See also ==
- Varanasi Cantt.
- Varanasi (Lok Sabha constituency)

== Notes ==
- All demographic data is based on 2011 Census of India.
