= Salarpur, Varanasi =

Salarpur
- Census town
- Census town location on Varanasi district map Salarpur (Uttar Pradesh) Salarpur (India)
- Coordinates: 25.353352°N 83.038823°E
- Country: India
- State: Uttar Pradesh
- District: Varanasi district
- Tehsil: Varanasi tehsil
- Elevation: 79.031 m (259.29 ft)

Population (2011)
  - Total: 10,126

Languages
  - Official: Hindi & English
- Time zone: UTC+5:30 (IST)
- Postal code: 221007
- Telephone code: +91-542
- Vehicle registration: UP65 XXXX
- Census town & village code: 209750
- Lok Sabha constituency: Varanasi (Lok Sabha constituency)
- Vidhan Sabha constituency: Varanasi Cantt.
- Website: www.salarpur.in

Salarpur is a census town in Varanasi tehsil of Varanasi district in the Indian state of Uttar Pradesh. The census town & village falls under the Salarpur gram panchayat. Salarpur Census town & village is about 8 kilometres North-East of Varanasi railway station, 329 kilometres South-East of Lucknow and 4 kilometres South-East of Sarnath.

== Demography ==
Salarpur has 1656 families with a total population of 10126. Sex ratio of the census town & village is 893 and child sex ratio is 949. Uttar Pradesh state average for both ratios is 912 and 902 respectively ^{[note]}.

Details	Male	Female	Total	Comments
Number of houses	–	–	1,656	(census 2011)
Adult	5,349	4,777	8,709	(census 2011)
Children	–	–	1,417	(census 2011)
Total population	–	–	10,126	(census 2011)
Literacy	80%	67.2%	74%	(census 2011)

== Transportation ==
Salarpur is connected by air (Lal Bahadur Shastri Airport), by train (Varanasi City railway station) and by road. Nearest operational airport is Lal Bahadur Shastri Airport and nearest operational railway station is Varanasi City railway station (25 and 8 kilometres respectively from Salarpur).

== See also ==
- Varanasi Cantt.
- Varanasi (Lok Sabha constituency)

== Notes ==
- All demographic data is based on 2011 Census of India.
