= Kakarmatta =

Bajardiha
- Census town
- Bajardiha
- Census town location on Varanasi district map Bajardiha (Uttar Pradesh) Bajardiha (India)
- Coordinates: 25.28901°N 82.968408°E
- Country: India
- State: Uttar Pradesh
- District: Varanasi district
- Tehsil: Varanasi tehsil
- Elevation: 81.79 m (268.3 ft)

Population (2011)
  - Total: 7,377

Languages
  - Official: Hindi & English
- Time zone: UTC+5:30 (IST)
- Postal code: 221010
- Telephone code: +91-542
- Vehicle registration: UP65 XXXX
- Census town code: 209738
- Lok Sabha constituency: Varanasi (Lok Sabha constituency)
- Vidhan Sabha constituency: Varanasi South

Bajardiha is a census town in Varanasi tehsil of Varanasi district in the Indian state of Uttar Pradesh. The census town does not have a gram panchayat. Bajardiha Census town is about 6 kilometers South of Varanasi railway station, 320 kilometers South-East of Lucknow and 266 kilometers West of Patna.

== Demography ==
Bajardiha has 1,141 families with a total population of 7,377. Sex ratio of the census town is 915 and child sex ratio is 1,066. Uttar Pradesh state average for both ratios is 912 and 902 respectively ^{[note]}.

Details	Male	Female	Total	Comments
Number of houses	-	-	1141	(census 2011)
Adult	3,853	3,524	6,472	(census 2011)
Children	-	-	905	(census 2011)
Total population	-	-	7,377	(census 2011)
Literacy	87.9%	73.8%	81.2%	(census 2011)

== Transportation ==
Bajardiha is connected by air (Lal Bahadur Shastri Airport), by train (Varanasi railway station) and by road. Nearest operational airports is Lal Bahadur Shastri Airport and nearest operational railway station is Manduadih Railway station Varanasi railway station (28 and 1 & 6 kilometers respectively from Bajardiha).

== See also ==
- Varanasi district
- Varanasi (Lok Sabha constituency)
- Varanasi South (Assembly constituency)
- Varanasi tehsil

== Notes ==
- All demographic data is based on 2011 Census of India.
