= Adampur, Varanasi =

Adampur
- Village
- Village location on Varanasi district map Adampur (Uttar Pradesh) Adampur (India)
- Coordinates: 25.326248°N 83.020585°E
- Country: India
- State: Uttar Pradesh
- District: Varanasi district
- Tehsil: Varanasi tehsil
- Elevation: 83.95 m (275.4 ft)

Population (2011)
  - Total: 2,897

Languages
  - Official: Hindi & English
- Time zone: UTC+5:30 (IST)
- Postal code: 221003
- Telephone code: +91-542
- Vehicle registration: UP65 XXXX
- Village code: 209207
- Lok Sabha constituency: Varanasi (Lok Sabha constituency)
- Vidhan Sabha constituency: Varanasi North

Adampur is a village in Varanasi tehsil of Varanasi district in the Indian state of Uttar Pradesh. The village falls under the Adampur gram panchayat. Adampur Village is about 1 kilometre (0.62 mi) southeast of Varanasi railway station, 267 kilometres (166 mi) southeast of Lucknow and 214 kilometres (133 mi) west of Patna.

== Demography ==
Adampur has 363 families with a total population of 2,897. Sex ratio of the village is 907 and child sex ratio is 944. Uttar Pradesh state average for both ratios is 912 and 902 respectively ^{[note]}.

Details	Male	Female	Total	Comments
Number of houses	-	-	363	(census 2011)
Adult	1,305	1,174	2,479	(census 2011)
Children	215	203	418	(census 2011)
Total population	1,520	1,377	2,897	(census 2011)
Literacy	82.7%	56.3%	70.2%	(census 2011)

== Transportation ==
Adampur is connected by air (Lal Bahadur Shastri Airport), by train (Varanasi City railway station) and by road. Nearest operational airport is Lal Bahadur Shastri Airport and nearest operational railway station is Varanasi City railway station (25 and 1.5 kilometers respectively from Adampur).

== See also ==
- Varanasi tehsil
- Varanasi district
- Varanasi North
- Varanasi (Lok Sabha constituency)

== Notes ==
- All demographic data is based on 2011 census of India.
