= Lerhupur =

- Census town
- Census town location on Varanasi district map Lerhupur (Uttar Pradesh) Lerhupur (India)
- Coordinates: 25.357836°N 83.040165°E
- Country: India
- State: Uttar Pradesh
- District: Varanasi district
- Tehsil: Varanasi tehsil
- Elevation: 78 m (256 ft)

Population (2011)
  - Total: 6,934

Languages
  - Official: Hindi & English
- Time zone: UTC+5:30 (IST)
- Postal code: 221007
- Telephone code: +91-542
- Vehicle registration: UP65 XXXX
- Census town & village code: 209748
- Lok Sabha constituency: Varanasi (Lok Sabha constituency)
- Vidhan Sabha constituency: Varanasi Cantt.

Lerhupur is a census town in Varanasi tehsil of Varanasi district in the Indian state of Uttar Pradesh. The census town & village falls under the Ladhupur gram panchayat. Lerhupur Census town & village is about 8 kilometers North-West of Varanasi railway station, 305 kilometers South-East of Lucknow and 17 kilometers North-West of Banaras Hindu University.

== Demography ==
Ledhupur has families with a total population of 6,934. Sex ratio of the census town & village is 876 and child sex ratio is 902. Uttar Pradesh state average for both ratios is 912 and 902 respectively ^{[note]}.

Details	Male	Female	Total	Comments
Number of houses	-	-	1,057	(census 2011)
Adult	-	-	5,808	(census 2011)
Children	-	-	1,126	(census 2011)
Total population	3,696	3,238	6,934	(census 2011)
Literacy	78.9%	62.2%	71.1%	(census 2011)

== Transportation ==
Lerhupur is connected by air (Lal Bahadur Shastri Airport), by train (Varanasi railway station) and by road. Nearest operational airports is Lal Bahadur Shastri Airport and nearest operational railway station is Varanasi railway station (25 and 8 kilometers respectively from Lerhupur).

== See also ==
- Varanasi Cantt.
- Varanasi (Lok Sabha constituency)

== Notes ==
- All demographic data is based on 2011 Census of India.
