= Susuwahi =

- Census town
- Census town location on Varanasi district map Susuwahi (Uttar Pradesh) Susuwahi (India)
- Coordinates: 25.255973°N 82.97435°E
- Country: India
- State: Uttar Pradesh
- District: Varanasi district
- Tehsil: Varanasi tehsil
- Elevation: 81.226 m (266.49 ft)

Population (2011)
  - Total: 10,454

Languages
  - Official: Hindi, Bhojpuri& English
- Time zone: UTC+5:30 (IST)
- Postal code: 221011
- Telephone code: +91-542
- Vehicle registration: UP65 XXXX
- Census town code: 209743
- Lok Sabha constituency: Varanasi (Lok Sabha constituency)
- Vidhan Sabha constituency: Rohaniya.

Susuwahi is a census town in Varanasi tehsil of Varanasi district in the Indian state of Uttar Pradesh. The census town falls under the Susuwahi gram panchayat. Susuwahi Census town is about 12 kilometers South of Varanasi railway station, 320 kilometers South-East of Lucknow and 5 kilometers South-West of Banaras Hindu University main gate.

== Demography ==
Susuwahi has 1,781 families with a total population of 10,454. Sex ratio of the census town is 923 and child sex ratio is 835. Uttar Pradesh state average for both ratios is 912 and 902 respectively ^{[note]}.

Details	Male	Female	Total	Comments
Number of houses	-	-	1,781	(census 2011)
Adult	-	-	9,316	(census 2011)
Children	-	-	1,138	(census 2011)
Total population	5,435	5,019	10,454	(census 2011)
Literacy	93.5%	79.8%	86.9%	(census 2011)

== Transportation ==
Susuwahi is connected by air (Lal Bahadur Shastri Airport), by train (Banaras railway station) and by road. Nearest operational airports is Lal Bahadur Shastri Airport and nearest operational railway station is Banaras (38 and 7.5 kilometers respectively from Susuwahi).

== See also ==
- Varanasi Cantt. (Assembly constituency)
- Varanasi (Lok Sabha constituency)

== Notes ==
- All demographic data is based on 2011 Census of India.
