= Amara Khaira Chak =

Census town in Varanasi, Uttar Pradesh

Amara Khaira Chowk
- Census town & village
- Census town & village location on Varanasi district map Amara Khaira Chowk (Uttar Pradesh) Amara Khaira Chowk (India)
- Coordinates: 25.253154°N 82.946123°E
- Country: India
- State: Uttar Pradesh
- District: Varanasi
- Tehsil: Sadar
- Elevation: 81.584 m (267.66 ft)

Population (2011)
  - Total: 6,577

Languages
  - Official: Hindi & English
- Time zone: UTC+5:30 (IST)
- Postal code: 221106
- Telephone code: +91-542
- Vehicle registration: UP65 XXXX
- Village code: 209741
- Lok Sabha constituency: Varanasi
- Vidhan Sabha constituency: Rohaniya

Amara Khaira Chowk is a census town in Sadar tehsil of Varanasi district in the northern Indian state of Uttar Pradesh. The census town and village falls under the Amara Khaira Chowk gram panchayat. Amara Khaira Chowk is about 12 kilometers South-West of Varanasi railway station, 317 kilometers South-East of Lucknow and 9 kilometers South-West of Banaras Hindu University main gate.

== Demographics ==
Amara Khaira Chak has 1,044 families with a total population of 6,577. The Sex ratio of the census town & village is 916 and the child sex ratio is 965. Uttar Pradesh state average for both ratios is 912 and 902 respectively.

== Transportation ==
Amara Khaira Chak is connected by air (Lal Bahadur Shastri Airport), by train (Varanasi railway station) and by road. The nearest operational airport is Lal Bahadur Shastri Airport and the nearest operational railway station is Varanasi railway station (35 and 12 kilometers respectively from Amara Khaira Chak).

== See also ==
- Varanasi (Lok Sabha constituency)
