= Satyanarayan Singh (Uttar Pradesh politician) =

Indian politician

Member of the India Parliament for Varanasi
- In office 4th Lok Sabha
- In office 1967–1971
- Preceded by: Raghunath Singh
- Succeeded by: Rajaram Shastri
- Constituency: Varanasi, Uttar Pradesh

Personal details
- Born: 1923 Jaunpur, Uttar Pradesh, India
- Died: 15 June 2020 (aged 97) Varanasi, Uttar Pradesh, India
- Cause of death: COVID-19
- Party: Communist Party of India (Marxist)
- Occupation: Politician

Satyanarayan Singh (1923—15 June 2020), also written as Satya Narain Singh, was an Indian politician.

He served as the Member of Parliament for Varanasi, in Uttar Pradesh, from 1967 to 1971, and was a member of the Communist Party of India (Marxist) political party.

== Early life and education ==
Satyanarayan Singh was born in Khajurahvan, Jaunpur district in UP. His father was Aditya Narayan Singh.

Singh received his early education in Deoband (UP) but soon quit his education to become a full-time politician.

== Political life ==
Singh was associated with the Hindustan Socialist Republican Army and the Revolutionary Socialist Party. Both pre and post-Indian Independence, owing to his political activities and affiliation, he was imprisoned on various occasions. He also had to remain underground for a considerable time.

Singh was elected to the Lok Sabha in the 1967 general election. He received 105,784 votes (37.55% of the votes) in the Varanasi constituency.

Singh died from COVID-19 on 15 June 2020, during the COVID-19 pandemic in India.

== Posts held ==
#	From	To	Position
01	1967	1971	Member 4th Lok Sabha

== See also ==
- 4th Lok Sabha
- Politics of India
- Parliament of India
- Government of India
