= Harpal Pur =

- Census town
- Census town location on Varanasi district map Harpal Pur (Uttar Pradesh) Harpal Pur (India)
- Coordinates: 25.303116°N 82.928517°E
- Country: India
- State: Uttar Pradesh
- District: Varanasi district
- Tehsil: Varanasi tehsil
- Elevation: 79.961 m (262.34 ft)

Population (2011)
  - Total: 7,710

Languages
  - Official: Hindi & English
- Time zone: UTC+5:30 (IST)
- Postal code: 221107
- Telephone code: +91-542
- Vehicle registration: UP65 XXXX
- Census town code: 209740
- Lok Sabha constituency: Varanasi (Lok Sabha constituency)
- Vidhan Sabha constituency: Varanasi Cantt.

Harpal Pur is a census town in Varanasi tehsil of Varanasi district in the Indian state of Uttar Pradesh. The census town & village falls under the Harpal Pur gram panchayat. Harpal Pur Census town & village is about 7.5 kilometers South-West of Varanasi railway station, 315 kilometers South-East of Lucknow and 10 kilometers North-West of Banaras Hindu University.

== Demography ==
Religion in Harpalpur (2011)
Religion	Percent
Islam	77.17%
Hinduism	21.96%
Christianity	0.17%
Jainism	0.03%
Others	0.13%

Harpal Pur has 1,028 families with a total population of 7,710. Sex ratio of the census town & village is 929 and child sex ratio is 1,053. Uttar Pradesh state average for both ratios is 912 and 902 respectively ^{[note]}.

Details	Male	Female	Total	Comments
Number of houses	-	-	1,028	(census 2011)
Adult	3,997	3,713	6,357	(census 2011)
Children	-	-	1,353	(census 2011)
Total population	-	-	7.710	(census 2011)
Literacy	60%	49.7%	55.1%	(census 2011)

== Transportation ==
Harpal Pur is connected by air (Lal Bahadur Shastri Airport), by train (Maruadih railway station) and by road. Nearest operational airports is Lal Bahadur Shastri Airport and nearest operational railway station is Maruadih railway station (27 and 5.5 kilometers respectively from Harpal Pur).

== See also ==
- Varanasi Cantt. (Assembly constituency)
- Varanasi district
- Varanasi (Lok Sabha constituency)
- Varanasi tehsil

== Notes ==
- All demographic data is based on 2011 Census of India.
