= Umarha =

Umaraha
- Census town
- Census town location on Varanasi district map Umaraha (Uttar Pradesh) Umaraha (India)
- Coordinates: 25.388447°N 83.064326°E
- Country: India
- State: Uttar Pradesh
- District: Varanasi district
- Tehsil: Varanasi tehsil
- Elevation: 81 m (266 ft)

Population (2011)
  - Total: 6,429

Languages
  - Official: Hindi & English
- Time zone: UTC+5:30 (IST)
- Postal code: 221112
- Telephone code: +91-542
- Vehicle registration: UP65 "XX" XXXX
- Census town code: 209747
- Lok Sabha constituency: Varanasi (Lok Sabha constituency)

Umaraha is a census town in Varanasi tehsil of Varanasi district in the Indian state of Uttar Pradesh. The census town & village falls under the Umaraha gram panchayat. Umarha Census town & village is about 12 kilometers North-East of Varanasi railway station, 317 kilometers South-East of Lucknow and 17 kilometers North-East of Banaras Hindu University main gate.

== Demography ==
Umaraha has 961 families with a total population of 6,429. Sex ratio of the census town is 921 and child sex ratio is 1,000. Uttar Pradesh state average for both ratios is 912 and 902 respectively ^{[note]}.

Details	Male	Female	Total	Comments
Number of houses	-	-	961	(census 2011)
Adult	-	-	5,535	(census 2011)
Children	-	-	894	(census 2011)
Total population	3,347	3,082	6,429	(census 2011)
Literacy	84.3%	63.7%	74.5%	(census 2011)

== Transportation ==
Umaraha is connected by air (Lal Bahadur Shastri Airport), by train (Varanasi railway station) and also connected by Highway Number 29. Nearest operational airports are Lal Bahadur Shastri Airport.The nearest operational railway station is Sarnath Station and Varanasi railway station (6 and 36 kilometres respectively from Umaraha).

== See also ==
- Varanasi (Lok Sabha constituency)

== Notes ==
- All demographic data is based on 2011 Census of India.
