= Birbhanpur =

- Census town
- Location on Varanasi district map Birbhanpur (Uttar Pradesh) Birbhanpur (India)
- Coordinates: 25.279509°N 82.8506°E
- Country: India
- State: Uttar Pradesh
- District: Varanasi district
- Tehsil: Varanasi tehsil
- Elevation: 82.068 m (269.25 ft)

Population (2011)
  - Total: 8,233

Languages
  - Official: Hindi & English
- Time zone: UTC+5:30 (IST)
- Postal code: 221311
- Telephone code: +91-542
- Vehicle registration: UP65 XXXX
- Census town: 209733
- Lok Sabha constituency: Varanasi (Lok Sabha constituency)
- Vidhan Sabha constituency: Varanasi Cantt.

Birbhanpur is a census town in Varanasi tehsil of Varanasi district in the Indian state of Uttar Pradesh. The census town & village falls under the Virbhan Pur gram panchayat. Birbhanpur Census town & village is about 18 kilometres South-West of Varanasi railway station, 306 kilometres South-East of Lucknow and 21 kilometres North-West of Banaras Hindu University.

== Demography ==
Birbhanpur has 1,205 families with a total population of 8233. Sex ratio of the census town & village is 929 and child sex ratio is 852. Uttar Pradesh state average for both ratios is 912 and 902 respectively ^{[note]}.

Details	Male	Female	Total	Comments
Number of houses	–	–	1,205	(census 2011)
Adult	4,269	3,964	7,068	(census 2011)
Children	–	–	1,165	(census 2011)
Total population	–	–	8,233	(census 2011)
Literacy	85.3%	59.9%	73%	(census 2011)

== Transportation ==
Birbhanpur is connected by air (Lal Bahadur Shastri Airport), by train (Maruadih railway station) and by road. Nearest operational airports is Lal Bahadur Shastri Airport and nearest operational railway station is Maruadih railway station (21 and 15 kilometres respectively from Birbhanpur).

== See also ==
- Varanasi Cantt.
- Varanasi district
- Varanasi (Lok Sabha constituency)
- Varanasi tehsil

== Notes ==
- All demographic data is based on 2011 Census of India.
