= Dindaspur =

- Census town
- Census town location on Varanasi district map Dindaspur (Uttar Pradesh) Dindaspur (India)
- Coordinates: 25.315477°N 82.840626°E
- Country: India
- State: Uttar Pradesh
- District: Varanasi district
- Tehsil: Varanasi tehsil
- Elevation: 84.514 m (277.28 ft)

Population (2011)
  - Total: 6,352

Languages
  - Official: Hindi & English
- Time zone: UTC+5:30 (IST)
- Postal code: 221405
- Telephone code: +91-542
- Vehicle registration: UP65 XXXX
- Census town code: 209731
- Lok Sabha constituency: Varanasi (Lok Sabha constituency)

Dindaspur is a census town in Varanasi tehsil of Varanasi district in the Indian state of Uttar Pradesh. The census town & village falls under the Dindaspur gram panchayat. Dindaspur Census town & village is about 18 kilometres west of Varanasi railway station, 310 kilometres south-east of Lucknow and 25 kilometres north-west of Banaras Hindu University main gate.

== Demography ==
Dindaspur has families with a total population of 6352. Sex ratio of the census town is 918 and child sex ratio is 952. Uttar Pradesh state average for both ratios is 912 and 902 respectively ^{[note]}.

Details	Male	Female	Total	Comments
Number of houses	–	–	901	(census 2011)
Adult	–	–	5,345	(census 2011)
Children	–	–	1.007	(census 2011)
Total population	3,312	3,040	6,352	(census 2011)
Literacy	77.7%	60.7%	69.6%	(census 2011)

== Transportation ==
Dindaspur is connected by air (Lal Bahadur Shastri Airport), by train (Varanasi railway station). Babatpur (BTP) Railway Station and by road. Nearest operational airports is Lal Bahadur Shastri Airport and nearest operational railway station is Babatpur Railway Station (11 and 12 kilometres respectively from Dindaspur).

== See also ==
- Varanasi tehsil
- Varanasi district
- Varanasi (Lok Sabha constituency)

== Notes ==
- All demographic data is based on 2011 Census of India.
