= Surendra Singh Patel =

Indian politician

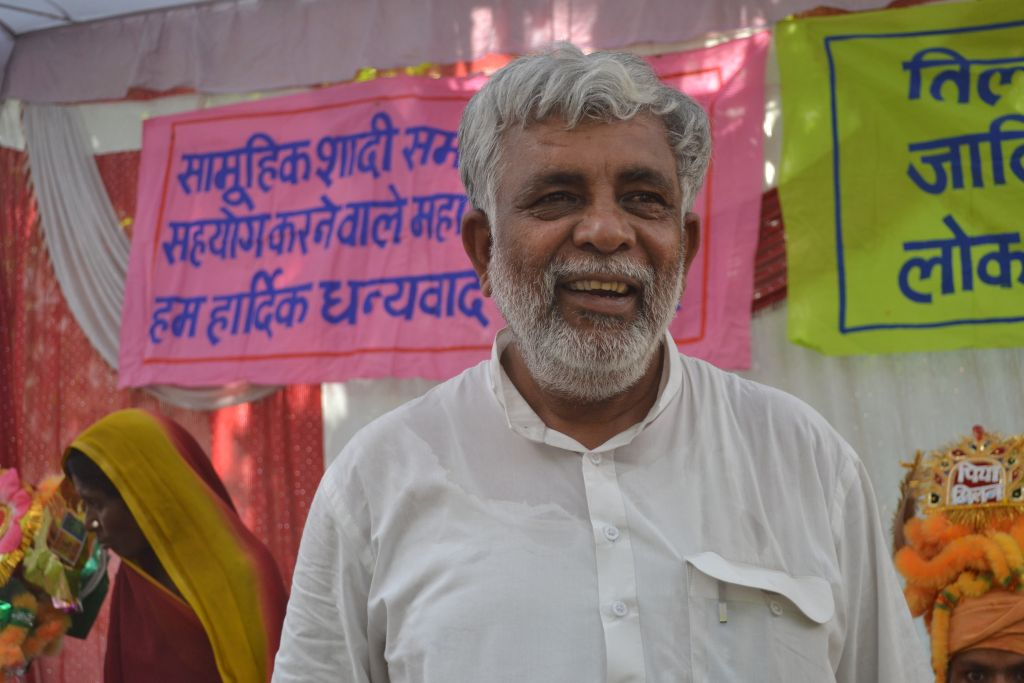
- Surendra Singh Patel

Minister of State for Public Works and Irrigation, Government of Uttar Pradesh
- In office 2012–2017

Member of Uttar Pradesh Legislative Assembly
- In office 2012–2017
- Preceded by: New
- Succeeded by: Neel Ratan Singh Patel
- Constituency: Sevapuri

Personal details
- Born: 25 November 1957 (age 68) Birbhanpur, Varanasi, Uttar Pradesh, India
- Party: Samajwadi Party

Surendra Singh Patel is an Indian politician from Uttar Pradesh. He was Member of the Legislative Assembly from Sevapuri constituency in Varanasi. Patel was appointed state minister of public works and irrigation department in the government of Uttar Pradesh. He was nominated by Samajwadi Party to contest Lok Sabha elections in Varanasi Lok Sabha constituency against incumbent Prime Minister of India Narendra Modi.

== See also ==
- Sixteenth Legislative Assembly of Uttar Pradesh
