= Shankar Prasad Jaiswal =

Indian politician (1932–2016)

MP, Lok Sabha
- In office 1996–2004
- Preceded by: Shrish Chandra Dikshit
- Succeeded by: Dr. Rajesh Kumar Mishra
- Constituency: Varanasi, Uttar Pradesh

Member of Legislative Assembly, Uttar Pradesh
- In office 1969–1974
- Preceded by: Vishwanath Prasad
- Succeeded by: Shafiur Rahman Ansari
- Constituency: Varanasi North

Personal details
- Born: 9 August 1932 Benares, Benares State, British India
- Died: 3 January 2016 (aged 83) Varanasi, Uttar Pradesh, India
- Party: Bharatiya Janata Party (BJP)
- Spouse: Savitri Devi
- Children: 4
- Profession: Social worker

Shankar Prasad Jaiswal (9 August 1932 – 3 January 2016) was an Indian politician and was Member of Parliament for three consecutive terms in the 11th, 12th & 13th Lok Sabhas. Jaiswal represented the Varanasi constituency of Uttar Pradesh and was a member of the Bharatiya Janata Party political party.

== Early life and education ==
Shankar Prasad Jaiswal was born in Varanasi, Uttar Pradesh on 9 August 1932. His highest attained educational qualification is Matriculation degree.

Before entering politics, he was a social worker. He died in 2016.

== Politics ==
Jaiswal, was elected for Lok Sabha for three consecutive terms from Varanasi constituency. Although he was elected for three straight terms, he remained in office for a total of eight years only (from 1996 to 2004). Prior to becoming MP, he was also a member of Uttar Pradesh Legislative Assembly (1969–1974) and held charge of whip in Uttar Pradesh Legislative Assembly (1969–1970). During his political career, Jaiswal also held several party positions in the Bharatiya Janata Party.

== Posts held ==
#	From	To	Position
01	1969	1974	Member, Uttar Pradesh Legislative Assembly
02	1969	1970	Whip, B.J.S, Uttar Pradesh Legislative Assembly
03	1977	1980	Member, Finance Committee
04	1996	1998	Elected to 11th Lok Sabha
05	1996	1997	Member, Committee on Urban and Rural Development
06	1996	1997	Member, Committee on Food, Civil Supplies and Public Distribution
07	1996	1997	Member, Consultative Committee, Ministry of Parliamentary Affairs
08	1997	1998	Member, Committee on Urban and Rural Development
09	1998	1999	Re-elected to 12th Lok Sabha
10	1998	1999	Whip, BJP Parliamentary Party, Lok Sabha
11	1998	1999	Member, Committee on Human Resource Development and its Sub-Committee-I on Value-based Education
12	1998	1999	Member, Consultative Committee, Ministry of Food and Consumer Affairs
13	1999	2004	Re-elected to 13th Lok Sabha
14	1999	2000	Member, Committee on Human Resource Development
15	1999	2001	Member, Committee on Estimates

== See also ==
- 11th Lok Sabha
- 12th Lok Sabha
- 13th Lok Sabha
- Politics of India
- Parliament of India
- Government of India
- Varanasi (Lok Sabha constituency)
