= Shyamdev Roy Chaudhari =

Indian politician (1939–2024)

- श्‍याम देव रॉय चौधरी

Member of Uttar Pradesh Legislative Assembly
- In office 1989–2017
- Succeeded by: Neelkanth Tiwari
- Constituency: Varanasi South
- Preceded by: Rajni Kant Dutta

Personal details
- Born: 22 June 1939; Bengal Province, British India
- Died: 26 November 2024 (aged 85); Varanasi, Uttar Pradesh, India
- Political party: Bharatiya Janata Party
- Spouse: Minati Roy Chaudhari
- Children: 2
- Education: B.Com.
- Profession: Politician; photographer

Shyamdev Roy Chaudhari (22 June 1939 – 26 November 2024), also known as Dada, was an Indian politician and former cabinet minister in Government of Uttar Pradesh. He was a member of Uttar Pradesh Legislative Assembly, representing Varanasi South assembly seven times from 1989 to 2017. Chaudhari died on 26 November 2024, at the age of 85.
