= Abdul Kalam (Varanasi politician) =

Indian politician

Uttar Pradesh legislative assembly
- In office 1996–2005
- Preceded by: Amarnath Yadav
- Succeeded by: Rabiya Kalam
- Constituency: Varanasi

Personal details
- Died: 2005
- Party: Samajwadi Party
- Spouse: Rabiya Kalam

Abdul Kalam was an Indian politician. He was the member of Uttar Pradesh legislative assembly from Varanasi.

== Political life ==
Abdul Kalam was first elected as a member of the Uttar Pradesh Legislative Assembly in the year 1996. In the year 2002, he was again elected as a member of the Uttar Pradesh Legislative Assembly from the same seat, but he died in the year 2005 due to illness.

When Abdul Kalam died due to illness in the year 2005, Samajwadi Party nominated his wife Rabiya Kalam as its candidate from Varanasi North Assembly.
