= Shatarudra Prakash =

Indian politician (born 1961)

Member of Uttar Pradesh Legislative Council
- In office 7 July 2016 – 6 July 2022
- Preceded by: Satish Chandra
- Constituency: Elected by the members of Legislative Assembly

Member of Uttar Pradesh Legislative Assembly
- In office 1974–1980
- Preceded by: Lal Bahadur Singh
- Succeeded by: Mandavi Prasad Singh
- Constituency: Varanasi Cantt.
- In office 1985–1991
- Preceded by: Mandavi Prasad Singh
- Succeeded by: Jyotsana Srivastava
- Constituency: Varanasi Cantt.

Personal details
- Born: 1961 (age 65) India
- Party: Samajwadi Party
- Other political affiliations: Bhartiya Kranti Dal; Lok Dal; Janata Party; Janata Dal
- Occupation: Politician

Shatarudra Prakash (born 1961) is an Indian politician and member of the Samajwadi Party in Uttar Pradesh. On 10 June 2016, he was elected to the Uttar Pradesh Legislative Council. Previously, he served as a member of the Uttar Pradesh Legislative Assembly, representing Varanasi Cantonment in two separate terms.
