= Harish Chandra Srivastava =

Indian politician (1925–2015)

Minister of Social Justice, Minister of Finance Government of Uttar Pradesh

Minister of Food Supply and Science & Technology, Government of Uttar Pradesh
- In office 1977–1979
- Chief Minister: Ram Naresh Yadav

Member of Uttar Pradesh Legislative Assembly
- In office 1977–1980
- Preceded by: Madhav Prasad Tripathi
- Succeeded by: Deena Nath
- Constituency: Bansi
- In office 1985–1989
- Preceded by: Deena Nath
- Succeeded by: Jai Pratap Singh
- Constituency: Bansi
- In office 1996–2007
- Preceded by: Jyotsana Srivastava
- Succeeded by: Jyotsana Srivastava
- Constituency: Varanasi Cantt.

Personal details
- Born: 21 February 1925 Manikapar, Uttar Pradesh, India (present-day Sant Kabir Nagar)
- Died: 18 January 2015 (aged 89) Varanasi, Uttar Pradesh, India
- Party: Bharatiya Janata Party
- Spouse: Dr. Jyotsana Srivastava
- Children: 2, including Saurabh Srivastava
- Education: Graduate
- Occupation: Politician

Harish Chandra Srivastava (21 February 1925 – 18 January 2015), fondly called Harish Ji, was an Indian politician and former Minister of Social Justice and Finance in the Government of Uttar Pradesh. He was elected to Uttar Pradesh Legislative Assembly two times from Bansi constituency of Siddharthnagar district and two times from Varanasi Cantt. constituency of Varanasi district. He also served as Minister of Food Supply and Science & Technology in Janata Party ministry from 1977 to 1979.
