= Shrish Chandra Dikshit =

Indian politician

MP, Lok Sabha
- In office 10th Lok Sabha.
- Preceded by: Anil Kumar Shastri
- Succeeded by: Shankar Prasad Jaiswal
- Constituency: Varanasi, Uttar Pradesh

Personal details
- Born: 3 January 1926 Raebareli, United Provinces, British India
- Died: 8 April 2014 (aged 88) Raebareli, Uttar Pradesh, India
- Citizenship: India
- Party: Bharatiya Janata Party (BJP).
- Spouse: Mrs. Uma Dikshit.
- Children: 2 sons & 3 daughters.
- Education: Lucknow University.
- Profession: Police officer & Social worker.

Shrish Chandra Dikshit was an Indian Politician and Member of Parliament in the 10th Lok Sabha. Dikshit represented the Varanasi constituency of Uttar Pradesh and was a member of the Bharatiya Janata Party political party. He died in April 2014.

== Education & background ==
Dikshit was born in Raebareli, Uttar Pradesh. He attended the Lucknow University and gained LL.B & M.A. degrees. He was a retired I.P.S officer and after retirement, joined politics in 1984. He died at his hometown in Raebareli on 8 April 2014 and was given full Police honours at his cremation, which as per his instructions was done at an electric crematorium, so as to not waste wood. Also, his ashes were not immersed in the Ganges so as to not pollute it.

== Police Service ==
Shrish Chandra Dikshit received I.P.S training at the Central Police Training College (C.P.T.C), Mount Abu. Dikshit served as First Class Magistrate, Subdivisional District Magistrate (SDM), SP, IG of CID, DG of Home Guard and held the post of DG for state of Uttar Pradesh from 1982 to 1984.

=== Awards ===
Dikshit has received following awards as an I.P.S officer.

1973: Indian Police Medal for long and meritorious service.

1980: President's Police Medal for distinguished service.

== Politics ==
In 1984, Dikshit became a member of VHP. Due to his association with VHP and involvement with the Ram Janmabhoomi movement, in 1990 he was arrested and detained.

Dikshit was elected in 10th Lok Sabha from Varanasi constituency as a member of Bharatiya Janata Party.

== Posts Held ==
#	From	To	Position
01	1991	1996	Elected to 10th Lok Sabha

== See also ==
- 10th Lok Sabha
- Politics of India
- Parliament of India
- Government of India
- Varanasi (Lok Sabha constituency)
- Ram Janmabhoomi
