= Thakurdas Jaiswal =

Raja Rai Bahadur Thakurdas Jaiswal was an Indian landlord raja and businessman from the royal family of Jamalpur. He was a nationalist who contributed in the freedom movement.

== Personal life ==
He migrated to Ranchi from Uttar Pradesh. He finished his education from Allahabad University earning a gold medal. His son Rai Sahib Laxmi Narayan grew the business, which allowed him, in 1922, to become the first Indian to own a Ford car that carried Mahatma Gandhi from Ranchi to Ramgarh for the Ramgarh Congress convention in 1940. It later conveyed Indian Presidents Rajendra Prasad and Zakir Hussain. Now, their friends continue to use it for marriage processions.

Rai Sahib's son Sheo Narain Jaiswal was the first mayor and chairman of Ranchi municipality (1962–76). His grandson Vice-Chancellor of Kashi Vidyapeeth Rajaram Shastri was awarded by Padma Vibhusan and was a Member of Parliament from Varanasi.The scion of a former royal family Aditya Vikram Jaiswal was the State President of AIPC Jharkhand and has joined the BJP.

== Royal Family of Jamalpur ==
He was a member of the erstwhile royal family of Jamalpur. During British rule, Jamalpur family became wine-merchants and excelled in various businesses. Many senior political leaders from the region who also fought for Indian independence movement belonged to his family. They are also known for their collection of vintage cars. During freedom movement, Mahatma Gandhi stayed at their place and travelled in one of their cars. The room and car used by Gandhi are still preserved in his memory.

== Career ==
He was given various names out of respect, including "shellac king of Bihar, Uttar Pradesh and Madhya Pradesh." He contributed towards the freedom movement by donating money. He donated lands to tribal people. Shri Rai Sahib turned down the title of Raja Saheb by the British government following Gandhiji’s advice in 1938. Shri Rai Bahadur was an industrial adviser to the government before independence.

The Jaiswal family is a traditional Congress supporter. Many family ancestors were leaders of the party.

In 18th century, the British government identified the potential of Madhuca longifolia and helped the Jaiswal family to open Ranchi distillery, the first in India, in 1875.
