= Jyotsana Srivastava =

Indian politician (born 1937)

Dr. Jyotsana Srivastava

Member of Uttar Pradesh Legislative Assembly
- In office 1991–1996
- Preceded by: Shatarudra Prakash
- Succeeded by: Harish Chandra Srivastava
- Constituency: Varanasi Cantt.
- In office 2007–2017
- Preceded by: Harish Chandra Srivastava
- Succeeded by: Saurabh Srivastava
- Constituency: Varanasi Cantt.

Personal details
- Born: 2 May 1937 (age 89) Varanasi, Uttar Pradesh, India
- Party: Bharatiya Janata Party
- Spouse: Harish Chandra Srivastava
- Children: 2, including Saurabh Srivastava
- Occupations: Politician; teacher; author
- Works: Economical History of England; Political and Economical Views of Rashtra Ratna Shiv Prasad Gupta
- Education: Mahatma Gandhi Kashi Vidyapeeth

Jyotsana Srivastava (born 2 May 1937) is an Indian politician and former member of Uttar Pradesh Legislative Assembly representing Varanasi Cantonment four times. She is the wife of veteran BJP leader Harish Chandra Srivastava. In 1986, she completed a doctorate from Kashi Vidyapeeth of Varanasi. She also works as teacher of agriculture in a college. She wrote and published some books like Economical History of England, Political and Economical Views of Rashtra Ratna Shiv Prasad Gupta etc. She belongs to the Kayastha community. She also participated in all movements of party.
