= Raghunath Singh (politician) =

Indian politician

Raghunath Singh (1911 – 26 April 1992) was an Indian politician Indian National Congress leader and was the first Member of Parliament. He belongs to a village Khewali, Lok Sabha from Varanasi, being elected in 1952, 1957 and 1962. He was the Chairman of Hindustan Zinc Limited in 1968. He was the Chairman of Shipping Corporation of India in 1977. He was born in Khewali, Varanasi and died on 26 April 1992 in Varanasi, India.
