= Chhatripur =

Village in Jaunpur, Uttar Pradesh, India

Chhatripur is a village in Jaunpur, Uttar Pradesh, India.
