= Chour Harpal =

Village in Punjab, Pakistan

Coordinates: 33°36′27″N 73°00′11″E

Chour Harpal or Chohr, is a village in Rawalpindi District.

== Demographics ==
The population of the village, according to 2017 census was 254.
