= Neel Ratan Singh Patel =

Indian politician

Member of Uttar Pradesh Legislative Assembly
- Incumbent
- Assumed office 11 March 2017
- Preceded by: Surendra Singh Patel
- Constituency: Sevapuri

Personal details
- Born: 7 November 1971 (age 55) Varanasi, Uttar Pradesh, India
- Party: Bharatiya Janata Party
- Other political affiliations: Apna Dal (Soneylal)
- Spouse: Vandana Singh
- Profession: Politician

Neel Ratan Singh Patel (born 7 November 1971) is an Indian politician and a member of 17th Legislative Assembly of Uttar Pradesh of India. He represents the Sevapuri constituency of Varanasi district. He is a member of the Bharatiya Janata Party and previously of Apna Dal (Soneylal) party.

== Political career ==
Ratan has been a member of the 17th Legislative Assembly of Uttar Pradesh. Since 2017, he has represented the Sevapuri constituency and is a member of the BJP and formerly AD(S).

== Personal life ==
Neel Ratan Singh Patel was born in Varanasi in a Kurmi family on 5 November 1971.

== Posts held ==
#	From	To	Position	Comments
01	2017	Incumbent	Member, 17th Legislative Assembly	

== See also ==
- Uttar Pradesh Legislative Assembly
