= Saurabh Srivastava (politician) =

Indian politician (born 1975)

Member of Uttar Pradesh Legislative Assembly
- Incumbent
- Assumed office 19 March 2017
- Preceded by: Dr. Jyotsana Srivastava
- Constituency: Varanasi Cantt.

Personal details
- Born: 8 August 1975 (age 49); Varanasi, Uttar Pradesh, India
- Political party: Bharatiya Janata Party
- Spouse: Sugandha Srivastava (m. 2000)
- Parent(s): Harish Chandra Srivastava (father); Jyotsana Srivastava (mother)
- Education: B. Com. PGDBA
- Occupation: Politician; Businessperson

Saurabh Srivastava (born 8 August 1975) is an Indian politician and a member of the Uttar Pradesh Legislative Assembly. He is a very active politician as well as businessman. He is a C&F Agent of products of Dabur, Royal Enfield, Bikfarm Biscuit, Bikanerwala, Revlon and Everyday Battery etc. He is a well-spoken person of the Bhartiya Janta Party and the MLA of the greatest populated constituency of Varanasi Cantt.
