= Ravindra Jaiswal =

Indian politician (born 1966)

Minister of Stamp, Court Fee & Registration, Government of Uttar Pradesh
- Incumbent
- Assumed office 21 August 2019
- Chief Minister: Yogi Adityanath
- Preceded by: Nand Gopal Gupta

Member of Uttar Pradesh Legislative Assembly
- Incumbent
- Assumed office 15 March 2012
- Preceded by: Haji Abdul Samad Ansari
- Constituency: Varanasi North

Personal details
- Born: 1 September 1966 (age 59) Varanasi, Uttar Pradesh, India
- Party: Bharatiya Janata Party
- Spouse: Anju Jaiswal
- Children: 2
- Parent: Ramashankar Jaiswal (father)
- Education: MBA; Bachelor of Laws; M. Com.
- Alma mater: Veer Bahadur Singh Purvanchal University
- Profession: Lawyer; politician

Ravindra Jaiswal (born 1 September 1966) is an Indian politician and a member of the Legislative Assembly of Uttar Pradesh of India. He represents the Varanasi North constituency of Uttar Pradesh and is a member of the Bharatiya Janata Party.

== Early life and education ==
Ravindra Jaiswal was born in Varanasi in 1966. He holds Bachelor of Laws, Master of Commerce and Master in Business Administration from Veer Bahadur Singh Purvanchal University. Prior to entering politics from ABVP, he was a lawyer by profession. He also runs a College and Hotel in Varanasi and graduated (Master in International Business & Law) from Boston USA Hult International Business School.

== Political career ==
Ravindra Jaiswal has been a MLA for third term. Jaiswal represents Varanasi North constituency and is a member of the Bharatiya Janata Party. Earlier he contested in 2002 and by-election in 2005 from Varanasi North. He was arrested in Ram Janmabhoomi demolition of Babri Masjid in 1992 as Kar Seva.

He has been appointed Minister of State (Independent Charge) for stamp, court fee and registration department in Yogi Adityanath ministry on 21 August 2019.

== Bibliography ==
Chil (ISBN 8185316406)

== Posts held ==
#	From	To	Position	Comments				
01	2012	2017	Member, 16th Legislative Assembly					
02	2017	–	Member, Seventeenth Legislative Assembly of Uttar Pradesh	Member, Eighteenth Legislative Assembly of Uttar Pradesh	2017	–	Member, 17th Legislative Assembly	Member, Member, 18th Legislative Assembly

== See also ==
- Bharatiya Janata Party
- Government of India
- Politics of India
- Uttar Pradesh Legislative Assembly
- Varanasi North
