= Raja Harpal, Pakistan =

Village in Sialkot District, Punjab, Pakistan

Coordinates: 32.488°N 74.659°E

Raja Harpal is a populated place in Punjab province, Pakistan. It is a village in Union Council Rasul Pur no. 2 in Sialkot Tehsil, a subdivision of the Sialkot District.

Raja Harpal is situated at an altitude of 255 metres (837 feet) above sea level.

== Demographics ==
Population of Raja Harpal
Census	Population	Citation
1951	480	
1961	761	
1972	819	
1981	932	
2017	1616	

In the 1961 Pakistan Census, Raja Harpal was reported to have an area of 552 acres (223 hectares) and a population of 761 (including 393 males and 368 females) across 137 households. The literacy rate was reported to be 18%.

By the time of the 1981 census, Raja Harpal was reported to have an area of 551 acres (223 hectares) and a population of 932 (including 449 males and 483 females), with a literacy rate of 21.5%. 926 inhabitants of the village were reported to be Muslim, and the average household size was reported to be 6.6 persons.

As of the 2017 census, Raja Harpal was reported to have an area of 557 acres (225 hectares) and a population of 1,616 (including 746 males, 869 females, and 1 transgender individual, all of whom are Muslim), with a literacy rate of 59%. The village was reported to have 1,179 individuals over the age of ten, 899 individuals over the age of 18, and 134 individuals over the age of 60.
