= Rajaram Shastri =

Indian educationist

Honourable Prof. Rajaram Shastri

Member of Parliament, Lok Sabha
- In office 1971–1977
- Constituency: Varanasi

Vice-Chancellor of Kashi Vidyapeeth
- In office 1964–1971

Raja Ram Shastri (also Rajaram Shastri) (4 June 1904 – 21 August 1991) was an Indian educationist, social, and political worker who was elected in the 1971 Indian general election as a member of parliament (MP) from Varanasi during the 5th Lok Sabha, the lower house of the Parliament of India. He was a professor and subsequently vice-chancellor of the Kashi Vidyapeeth from 1964 – 1971. He was a member of Jamalpur's royal family as the grandson of Rai Bahadur Thakur Jaiswal.

He served as a member of first National Commission on Labour and received Padma Vibhushan in 1991, the second highest civilian honor of India, for his contributions to social and educational welfare. He was also a member of the University Grants Commission. Prof. Shastri was author of works titled 'Samaj Vigyan' and 'Swapna Darshan' for which he was awarded prize by the Government of Uttar Pradesh.

He died in New Delhi on 21 August 1991, aged 87.

== Early life ==
Shastri was born in Jamalpur village of Mirzapur district in Uttar Pradesh on June 4, 1904. He completed his education at Kashi Vidyapeeth and University of Chicago, and was married to Smt. Saudamini Devi in 1927.

== Affiliations ==
- Member, AICC., 1947
- Member, Socialist Party (now P.S.P.), 1948-59 also Member of its Executive, 1958
- Member, National Commission on Labour
- Adhyaksha, Puraskar Yojana Samiti, Government of U.P. (Prize Distribution Committee on Hindi, Urdu and Sanskrit books)
- Member, University Grants Commission's Committee on Social Work, Education and Training
- Vice-Chairman, Indian Council on Social Welfare
- Member of Central Social Welfare Board
- Member of Hindi Granth Academy, U.P.
- Member of Yojana Mulyankan Samiti, U.P. Government (Planning Evaluation Committee)

== Writings ==
- Man ke Bhed (Hindi)
- Vaiyaktik Manovigyan (Hindi)
- Samaj Vigyan (Hindi)
- Social Work Traditions in India (English)
- Swapna Darshan (Hindi)
