= Lohta =

- Census town
- Location in Varanasi
- Coordinates: 25°18′40″N 82°56′08″E
- Country: India
- State: Uttar Pradesh
- District: Varanasi

Population (2001)
  - Total: 19,695

Languages
  - Official: Hindi
- Time zone: UTC+5:30 (IST)

Lohta is a census town in Varanasi district in the Indian state of Uttar Pradesh.

== Demographics ==
Religion in Lohta (2011)
Religion	Percent
Islam	76.34%
Hinduism	23.46%
Sikhism	0.03%
Christianity	0.06%
Others	0.10%

As of 2001 India census, Lohta had a population of 19,695. Males constitute 53% of the population and females 47%. Lohta has an average literacy rate of 50%, lower than the national average of 59.5%: male literacy is 55%, and female literacy is 45%. In Lohta, 22% of the population is under 6 years of age. Since 1930 to present lohta is the largest producer of banarasi sarees.
