= Sevapuri Assembly constituency =

Constituency of the Uttar Pradesh legislative assembly in India

Coordinates: 25.37°N 82.75°E

Sevapuri
- Constituency No. 391 for the Uttar Pradesh Legislative Assembly

Constituency details
- Country: India
- Region: North India
- State: Uttar Pradesh
- District: Varanasi
- Total electors: 3,31,952 (2019)
- Reservation: None

Member of Legislative Assembly
- 18th Uttar Pradesh Legislative Assembly
- Incumbent Neel Ratan Singh Patel
- Party: Bharatiya Janta Party
- Elected year: 2022

Sevapuri is a constituency of the Uttar Pradesh Legislative Assembly in the state of Uttar Pradesh, India. The constituency covers the city of Sevapuri in the Varanasi district.

Sevapuri is one of five assembly constituencies in the Varanasi Lok Sabha constituency. Since 2008, this assembly constituency is numbered 391 amongst 403 constituencies.

== Members of the Legislative Assembly ==
| Year | Name | Party |
|---|---|---|
Till 2012 : Constituency did not exist
| 2012 | Surendra Singh Patel | Samajwadi Party |
| 2017 | Neel Ratan Singh Patel | Apna Dal (Soneylal) |
| 2022 | Neel Ratan Singh Patel | Bharatiya Janata Party |

== Election results ==
=== 2027 ===
2027 Uttar Pradesh Legislative Assembly election: Sevapuri
| Party | Candidate | Votes | % | ±% |
|---|---|---|---|---|
| INDIA | | | | |
| NDA | | | | |
| BSP | | | | |
| NOTA | None of the above | | | |
| Majority | | | | |
| Turnout | | | | |
| gain from | | Swing | | |

=== 2022 ===
2022 Uttar Pradesh Legislative Assembly election: Sevapuri
| Party | Candidate | Votes | % | ±% |
|---|---|---|---|---|
| BJP | Neel Ratan Singh | 105,163 | 47.6 | |
| SP | Surendra Singh Patel | 82,632 | 37.41 | ▲11.14 |
| BSP | Arvind Kumar Tripathi | 24,065 | 10.89 | ▼6.38 |
| INC | Anju Anand Singh | 2,974 | 1.35 | |
| NOTA | None of the above | 1,587 | 0.72 | ▼0.07 |
| Majority | | 22,531 | 10.19 | ▼13.62 |
| Turnout | | 220,910 | 63.83 | ▼1.02 |
| BJP gain from AD(S) | | Swing | | |

=== 2017 ===
Apna Dal (Sonelal) candidate Neel Ratan Singh Patel won in 2017 Uttar Pradesh Legislative Assembly election defeating Samajwadi Party candidate Surendra Singh Patel by a margin of 49,182 votes.

2017 Uttar Pradesh Legislative Assembly election: Sevapuri
| Party | Candidate | Votes | % | ±% |
|---|---|---|---|---|
| AD(S) | Neel Ratan Singh Patel | 103,423 | 50.08 | |
| SP | Surendra Singh Patel | 54,241 | 26.27 | |
| BSP | Mahendra Kumar Pandey | 35,657 | 17.27 | |
| Independent | Vibhuti Narayan Singh | 2,789 | 1.35 | |
| NOTA | None of the above | 1,626 | 0.79 | |
| Majority | | 49,182 | 23.81 | |
| Turnout | | 206,507 | 64.85 | |
| AD(S) gain from SP | | Swing | | |

=== 2012 ===
U. P. Legislative Assembly Election, 2012: Sevapuri
| Party | Candidate | Votes | % | ±% |
|---|---|---|---|---|
| SP | Surendra Singh Patel | 56,849 | 31.87 | |
| AD(K) | Neel Ratan Singh Patel | 36,942 | 20.71 | |
| BSP | Manish Kumar Singh | 32,316 | 18.12 | |
| INC | Harsh Vardhan Singh | 23,990 | 13.45 | |
| QED | Dr. Omkar Singh Patel | 9,883 | 5.54 | |
| BJP | Devendra Pratap | 9,811 | 5.50 | |
| Majority | | 19,907 | 11.16 | |
| Turnout | | 1,78,381 | 62.29 | |
| SP win (new seat) | | | | |
