= Anil Srivastava =

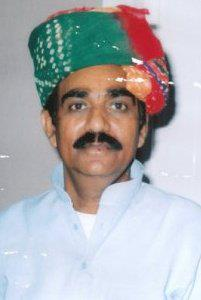

District President of Indian National Congress Varanasi
- Incumbent
- Assumed office 2010

General Secretary of Indian National Congress UP Congress committee
- In office 2003–2010

Secretary of Indian National Congress UP Congress committee
- In office 1992–2002

Member of AICC
- In office 1992–2002

Secretary IYC
- Incumbent
- Assumed office 1987

Secretary NSUI
- In office 1985–1987

President BHU
- Incumbent
- Assumed office 1985

General Secretary BHU
- Incumbent
- Assumed office 1985

President BHU Deligacy
- Incumbent
- Assumed office 1978

Personal details
- Born: Varanasi, India
- Party: Indian National Congress
- Relations: Arvind Srivastava (Nephew)
- Education: BHU
- Website: anilbhu.com
- As of 7 January, 2012

Anil Srivastava (born in Varanasi) is an Indian politician and district president of the Indian National Congress, Varanasi. His political party is the Indian National Congress.

== Early life and career ==
Anil Srivastava was born in Varanasi. Anil Srivastava attended Banaras Hindu University from 1978 to 1986. He was elected president of the university’s now-defunct student union. He married in 1989.

== Political career ==
Anil Srivastava ran a state level campaign, in Uttar Pradesh to save student unions in the reign of Veer Bhadra Singh and forayed into the nation scene of the active politics.

He is a figure in the campaign of UP Assembly elections. Party value him as an observer in all the student organization elections not only in UP but also for Delhi University Student Union (DUSU).

In 2010, Srivastava has been elected president of Varanasi District, Indian National Congress.

Srivastav lost 2017 Uttar Pradesh Vidhan Sabha elections on congress ticket from Varanasi cantonment constituency.

=== Youth politics ===
In his attempt to prove himself as a youth leader he was an active participant in Indian Youth Congress (IYC), an organization that he has been keen to transform since he was appointed secretary in September 1987.

Srivastava has contributed to significant work by NSUI.

Anil Srivastava participated in sessions with various students of Banaras Hindu University on multiple occasions in an attempt to gain support for his policies among students.

== See also ==
- Political Families of The World

Lok Sabha
Preceded by Sonia Gandhi	Member for Amethi; 2004 – present	Incumbent
