= Kashi railway station =

Railway station in Uttar Pradesh, India

KASHI
- Indian Railways logo

General information
- Location: Kashi Railway Station Road, Varanasi, Uttar Pradesh; India
- Coordinates: 25.327494°N 83.031522°E
- Elevation: 81.268 m (266.63 ft)
- System: Indian Railways station
- Owner: Indian Railways
- Operator: Indian Railways
- Platforms: 3
- Tracks: 4 Double Electrified tracks
- Train operators: Indian Railways
- Connections: Auto rickshaw Bus

Construction
- Structure type: Standard (on-ground station)
- Parking: Available
- Cycle facilities: Available
- Accessible: Not available

Other information
- Station code: KEI
- Zone(s): Northern Railway
- Division(s): Varanasi
- Fare zone: Northern Railway zone
Location
- Location within Varanasi district Location within Uttar Pradesh Location within India
- Interactive map

Kashi railway station is one of the railway stations in Varanasi district. It is 6 kilometres (3.7 mi) east of Varanasi Junction railway station, 11 kilometres (6.8 mi) North-West of Pandit Deen Dayal Upadhyaya Junction railway station and 26 kilometres (16 mi) South-East of Lal Bahadur Shastri Airport. Kashi railway station serves the Eastern suburbs of Varanasi district and serves as major secondary railway station to Varanasi and Pandit Deen Dayal Upadhyaya railway stations.

== General ==
Kashi railway station has three platforms. Four double electrified tracks pass through the station. On average, two trains originate and thirty-eight trains halt at this station daily.

== Modernization ==
The railways redeveloped the station, coming up with the modern amenities. The station was upgraded with beautiful walls, waiting rooms, circulating areas and a foot overbridge (FOB). The walls of station were coated with beautiful religious and cultural paintings. LEDs were also added to get over poor lighting and decorative lights were used to enhance the beautification at night. For up-gradation, up to Rs. 1 Crore was spent.

=== Plans ===
Due to heavy traffic congestion and growing industry demands in Varanasi, Kashi railway station was chosen for Intermodal Station (IMS) by National Highways Authority of India (NHAI). The Intermodal station will be integrated with various transportation modes, such as rail, road, mass rapid transit system, bus rapid transit system, and inland waterways. It will be developed under public–private partnership. The area required for development of Intermodal Station (IMS) is estimated to be 47.26 acres.

== See also ==
- Varanasi Junction railway station
- Banaras railway station
- Varanasi City railway station
