= Harpal Talhan =

Pakistani boxer (born 1965)

Personal information
- Nationality: Punjabi
- Born: Harpal Talhan; February 8, 1965 (age 61)
- Weight: Lightweight

Boxing career
- Stance: Orthodox

Boxing record
- Total fights: 18
- Wins: 15
- Win by KO: 6
- Losses: 1
- Draws: 2
- No contests: 0

Harpal Talhan (born February 8, 1965) is a retired Canadian lightweight boxer who contested in 18 fights and was the Canadian lightweight champion.

He currently resides in Surrey, B.C.-married with 3 children and is a businessman. One of his sons, Tyson Talhan, is a prominent criminal lawyer in Vancouver, B.C.

He fought in Canada and the US, including boxing in Las Vegas. In 1990, he took on the holder of the Canadian lightweight title John Kalbhenn in Toronto, Ontario, Canada and beat him to become the new Canadian lightweight champion.
