= Neelkanth Tiwari =

Indian politician (born 1971)

Dr. Neelkanth Tiwari

Minister of State (Independent charge); Law and Justice, Information, Sports and Youth Welfare of Uttar Pradesh
- Incumbent
- Assumed office 19 March 2017
- Chief Minister: Yogi Adityanath
- Constituency: Varanasi South

Member of Uttar Pradesh Legislative Assembly
- Incumbent
- Assumed office 22 March 2017
- Preceded by: Shyamdev Roy Chaudhari
- Constituency: Varanasi South

Personal details
- Born: 20 July 1971 (age 54) India
- Party: Bharatiya Janata Party
- Children: 2

Dr. Neelkanth Tiwari (born 20 July 1971) |Yogi Adityanath ministry]]. He is member of Uttar Pradesh Legislative Assembly representing Varanasi South which was represented by Shyamdev Roy Chaudhari seven times, from 1989 to 2017 until he was elected in 2017. He married Poonam Tiwari on 25 June 1994 and they had one son named Shambhav Tiwari (born 30 November) and one daughter named Shambhavi Tiwari (born 21 December).

Dr. Tiwari got the ministries of Law and Justice, Information, Sports and Youth Welfare. He is also the Tourism Minister of Uttar Pradesh.
