= Harpalyce =

Harpalyce or Harpalyke may refer to:

- Harpalyce (mythology), several women in Greek mythology
- Harpalyce (plant), a genus in the family Fabaceae of flowering plants
- Harpalyce, a ship sunk by UB-4 during World War I
- Harpalyke (moon), a moon of Jupiter
- Delias harpalyce, an Australian butterfly in the family Pieridae
- Harpalyce, character in the Teseida by Boccaccio.
