= Varanasi North Assembly constituency =

Constituency of the Uttar Pradesh legislative assembly in India

Coordinates: 25.367°N 83.001°E

Varanasi North
- Constituency No. 388 for the Uttar Pradesh Legislative Assembly

Constituency details
- Country: India
- Region: North India
- State: Uttar Pradesh
- District: Varanasi
- Total electors: 4,04,345 (2019)
- Reservation: None

Member of Legislative Assembly
- 18th Uttar Pradesh Legislative Assembly
- Incumbent Ravindra Jaiswal
- Party: Bharatiya Janta Party
- Elected year: 2022

Varanasi North is a constituency of the Uttar Pradesh Legislative Assembly covering the city of Varanasi North in the Varanasi district of Uttar Pradesh, India.

Varanasi North is one of five assembly constituencies in the Varanasi Lok Sabha constituency. Since 2008, this assembly constituency has been numbered 388 amongst 403 constituencies.

== Members of Legislative Assembly ==
Year	Member	Party
1952	Sheikh Abdul Samad	Indian National Congress
1952	Lal Bahadur Singh	Indian National Congress
1957	Sheikh Abdul Samad	Indian National Congress
1962	Vishwanath Prasad	Bharatiya Jana Sangh
1967	Vishwanath Prasad	Bharatiya Jana Sangh
1969	Shankar Prasad Jaiswal	Bharatiya Jana Sangh
1974	Shafiur Rahman Ansari	Indian National Congress
1977	Mushtaq Ahmad	Janata Party
1980	Shafiur Rahman Ansari	Indian National Congress (I)
1985	Shafiur Rahman Ansari	Indian National Congress
1989	Amarnath Yadav	Bharatiya Janata Party
1991	Amarnath Yadav	Bharatiya Janata Party
1993	Amarnath Yadav	Bharatiya Janata Party
1996	Abdul Kalam	Samajwadi Party
2002	Abdul Kalam	Samajwadi Party
2005^	Rabiya Begum	Samajwadi Party
2007	Abdul Samad Ansari	Samajwadi Party
2012	Ravindra Jaiswal	Bharatiya Janata Party
2017	Ravindra Jaiswal	Bharatiya Janata Party
2022	Ravindra Jaiswal	Bharatiya Janata Party

== Election results ==
=== 2027 ===
2027 Uttar Pradesh Legislative Assembly election: Varanasi North
Party	Candidate	Votes	%	±%
BJP				
INC				
BSP				
NOTA	None of the above			
Majority				
Turnout				
gain from		Swing		

=== 2022 ===
2022 Uttar Pradesh Legislative Assembly election: Varanasi North
Party	Candidate	Votes	%	±%
BJP	Ravindra Jaiswal	134,471	54.61	+3.66
SP	Ashfaque Ahmed	93,695	38.05	
BSP	Shyam Prakash	10,457	4.25	−10.06
INC	Gulerana Sabassum	3,102	1.26	−29.71
NOTA	None of the above	1,532	0.62	+0.13
Majority		40,776	16.56	−3.42
Turnout		246,225	57.65	−1.55
BJP hold		Swing		

=== 2017 ===
Bharatiya Janta Party candidate Ravindra Jaiswal won in 2017 Uttar Pradesh Legislative Elections defeating Indian National Congress candidate Abdul Samad Ansari by a margin of 45,502 votes.

2017 Uttar Pradesh Legislative Assembly election: Varanasi North
Party	Candidate	Votes	%	±%
BJP	Ravindra Jaiswal	116,017	50.95	
INC	Abdul Samad Ansari	70,515	30.97	
BSP	Sujeet Kumar Maurya	32,574	14.31	
NOTA	None of the above	1,115	0.49	
Majority		45,502	19.98	
Turnout		227,695	59.2	
BJP hold		Swing		

=== 2012 ===
U. P. Legislative Assembly Election, 2012: Varanasi North
Party	Candidate	Votes	%	±%
BJP	Ravindra Jaiswal	47,980	26.49	
BSP	Sujeet Kumar Maurya	45,644	25.20	
SP	Abdul Samad Ansari	37,434	20.67	
INC	Rabiya Kalam	31,029	17.13	
QED	Ravikant Singh	4,709	2.60	
Majority		2,336	1.29	
Turnout		1,81,126	52.24	
BJP gain from SP		Swing		

=== 2007 ===
U. P. Legislative Assembly Election, 2007: Varanasi North
Party	Candidate	Votes	%	±%
SP	Haji Abdul Samad Ansari	26,544	29.85	
BJP	Dr. Shivnath Yadav	24,345	27.37	
Independent	Rabiya Kalam	17,652	19.85	
BSP	Vijay Prakash Gupta	7,349	8.26	
INC	Sheikh Mohammad Shamim	4,068	4.57	
Majority		2,199	2.48	
Turnout		88,919	31.86	
SP hold		Swing		

U. P. Legislative Assembly By Election, 2005: Varanasi North
Party	Candidate	Votes	%	±%
SP	Rabiya Kalam	48,862	51.43	
BJP	Ravindra Jaiswal	32,864	34.59	
INC	Dr. Wakil Ahmed Ansari	9,207	9.69	
BSP	Kunwar Pramod Singh	1,953	2.05	
AD(K)	Mohammad Rafique Ansari	588	0.61	
Majority		15,998	16.84	
Turnout		95,005	32.80	
SP hold		Swing		

=== 2002 ===
2002 Uttar Pradesh Legislative Assembly election: Varanasi North
Party	Candidate	Votes	%	±%
SP	Abdul Kalam	56,805	52.54	
BJP	Ravindra Jaiswal	37,268	34.47	
INC	Abdul Aziz Ansari	6,729	6.22	
BSP	Rajendra Prasad Kushwaha	4,227	3.91	
Majority		19,537	18.07	+8.93
Turnout		108,120	37.19	−9.77

=== 1996 ===
1996 Uttar Pradesh Legislative Assembly election: Varanasi North
Party	Candidate	Votes	%	±%
SP	Abdul Kalam	67,349	52.11	
BJP	Amar Nath Yadav	55,539	42.97	
BSP	Moti Lal Seth	5,182	4.01	
Majority		11,810	9.14	+2.44
Turnout		129,247	46.96	−6.83
SP gain from		Swing		

=== 1993 ===
1993 Uttar Pradesh Legislative Assembly election: Varanasi North
Party	Candidate	Votes	%	±%
BJP	Amarnath Yadav	43,974	40.51	
Independent	Kalam	36,696	33.81	
INC	Anil Kumar Singh	13,091	12.06	
SP	Krishna Nigam	11,353	10.46	
Majority		7,278	6.70	
Turnout		108,538	53.79	
