= Varanasi South Assembly constituency =

Constituency of the Uttar Pradesh legislative assembly in India

Coordinates: 25.28°N 82.98°E

Varanasi South
- Constituency No. 389 for the Uttar Pradesh Legislative Assembly

Constituency details
- Country: India
- Region: North India
- State: Uttar Pradesh
- District: Varanasi
- Total electors: 2,96,592 (2019)
- Reservation: None

Member of Legislative Assembly
- 18th Uttar Pradesh Legislative Assembly
- Incumbent Dr. Neelkanth Tiwari
- Party: Bharatiya Janata Party
- Elected year: 2022

Varanasi South is a constituency of the Uttar Pradesh Legislative Assembly covering the city of Varanasi South in the Varanasi district of Uttar Pradesh, India.

Varanasi South is one of five assembly constituencies in the Varanasi Lok Sabha constituency. Since 2008, this assembly constituency is numbered 389 amongst 403 constituencies.

== Members of Legislative Assembly ==
Year	Member	Party
1952	Raj Narain	Socialist Party
1952	Sampurnanand	Indian National Congress
1957	Sampurnanand	Indian National Congress
1962	Girdhari Lal	Indian National Congress
1967	Rustom Satin	Communist Party of India
1969	Sachindra Bakshi	Bharatiya Jana Sangh
1974	Charan Das Seth	Bharatiya Jana Sangh
1977	Raj Bali Tiwari	Janata Party
1980	Kailash Tandon	Indian National Congress (I)
1985	Rajni Kant Dutta	Indian National Congress
1989	Shyamdev Roy Chaudhari	Bharatiya Janata Party
1991	Shyamdev Roy Chaudhari	Bharatiya Janata Party
1993	Shyamdev Roy Chaudhari	Bharatiya Janata Party
1996	Shyamdev Roy Chaudhari	Bharatiya Janata Party
2002	Shyamdev Roy Chaudhari	Bharatiya Janata Party
2007	Shyamdev Roy Chaudhari	Bharatiya Janata Party
2012	Shyamdev Roy Chaudhari	Bharatiya Janata Party
2017	Neelkanth Tiwari	Bharatiya Janata Party
2022	Neelkanth Tiwari	Bharatiya Janata Party

== Election results ==
=== 2027 ===
2027 Uttar Pradesh Legislative Assembly election: Varanasi South
Party	Candidate	Votes	%	±%
NDA				
INDIA				
BSP				
NOTA	None of the above			
Majority				
Turnout				
gain from		Swing		

=== 2022 ===
Bharatiya Janta Party candidate Dr. Neelkanth Tiwari won in 2022 Uttar Pradesh Legislative Elections defeating Samajvadi Party candidate Kameshwar Nath Dixit alias Kishan by a margin of 10,722 votes.

2022 Uttar Pradesh Legislative Assembly election: Varanasi South
Party	Candidate	Votes	%	±%
BJP	Neelkanth Tiwari	99,622	50.88	−0.88
SP	Kameshwar Nath Dixit	88,900	45.41	
INC	Mudita Kapoor	2,166	1.11	−41.01
BSP	Dinesh Kasaudhan	1,855	0.95	−2.36
NOTA	None of the above	938	0.48	+0.22
Majority		10,722	5.47	−4.17
Turnout		195,782	60.51	−3.07
BJP hold		Swing		

=== 2017 ===
Bharatiya Janta Party candidate Dr. Neelkanth Tiwari won in 2017 Uttar Pradesh Legislative Elections defeating Indian National Congress candidate Rajesh Mishra by a margin of 17,226 votes.

U. P. Assembly Election, 2017: Varanasi South
Party	Candidate	Votes	%	±%
BJP	Dr. Neelkanth Tiwari	92,560	51.76	
INC	Rajesh Kumar Mishra	75,334	42.12	
BSP	Rakesh Tripathi	5,922	3.31	
NOTA	None of the above	457	0.26	
Majority		17,226	9.64	
Turnout		178,837	63.58	
BJP hold		Swing		

=== 2012 ===
U. P. Assembly Election, 2012: Varanasi South
Party	Candidate	Votes	%	±%
BJP	Shyamdev Roy Chaudhari (Dada)	57,868	38.22	
INC	Daya Shankar Mishra (Dayalu)	44,046	29.09	
QED	Atahar Jamal Lari	20,454	13.51	
SP	Mohammad Istaqbal (Babu)	14,642	9.67	
BSP	Kaisar Ameen Ansari	8,841	5.84	
Majority		13,822	9.13	
Turnout		1,51,400	55.49	
BJP hold		Swing		

=== 2007 ===
U. P. Assembly Election, 2007: Varanasi South
Party	Candidate	Votes	%	±%
BJP	Shyamdev Roy Chaudhari (Dada)	33,021	46.24	
INC	Dr. Dayashankar Mishra (Dayalu)	19,319	27.05	
SP	Dilip Kumar Day	11,956	16.74	
BSP	Vikram Vij (Vikki Punjabi)	4,400	6.16	
IND.	Sankata Prasad Pandey (Bumguru)	590	0.82	
Majority		13,702	19.19	
Turnout		71,407	31.18	
BJP hold		Swing		

=== 2002 ===
U. P. Assembly Election, 2002: Varanasi South
Party	Candidate	Votes	%	±%
BJP	Shyamdev Roy Chaudhari (Dada)	43,458	52.63	
SP	Rakesh Jain	22,653	27.44	
INC	Mani Shankar Pandey	11,705	14.18	
BSP	Engineer Asalam Perwaze	2,080	2.52	
RTKP	Vijay	837	1.01	
Majority		20,805	25.19	
Turnout		82,567	30.31	
BJP hold		Swing		

=== 1996 ===
U. P. Assembly Election, 1996: Varanasi South
Party	Candidate	Votes	%	±%
BJP	Shyamdev Roy Chaudhari (Dada)	65,288	68.06	
INC	Devbrat Majumdar	28,006	29.19	
AD(K)	Mahmood	958	1.00	
CPI(ML)L	Amabrish Rai	532	0.55	
Akhil Bharatiya Jan Sangh	Ajay Shankar	471	0.49	
Majority		37,282	38.87	
Turnout		95,933	35.73	
BJP hold		Swing		
