= Varanasi Cantonment Assembly constituency =

Constituency of the Uttar Pradesh legislative assembly in India

Coordinates: 25.33°N 82.97°E

Varanasi Cantonment
- Constituency No. 390 for the Uttar Pradesh Legislative Assembly

Constituency details
- Country: India
- Region: North India
- State: Uttar Pradesh
- District: Varanasi
- Total electors: 4,32,293 (2019)
- Reservation: None

Member of Legislative Assembly
- 18th Uttar Pradesh Legislative Assembly
- Incumbent Saurabh Srivastava
- Party: Bharatiya Janata Party
- Elected year: 2022

Varanasi Cantonment is a constituency of the Uttar Pradesh Legislative Assembly covering the city of Varanasi Cantonment in the Varanasi district of Uttar Pradesh, India.

Varanasi Cantonment is one of five assembly constituencies in the Varanasi Lok Sabha constituency. Since 2008, this assembly constituency is numbered 390 amongst 403 constituencies.

As of now, this seat belongs to Bharatiya Janta Party candidate Saurabh Srivastava who won in 2017 Uttar Pradesh Legislative Elections by defeating Indian National Congress candidate Anil Srivastava by a margin of 61,326 votes.

== Members of Legislative Assembly ==
| Year | Member | Party |
|---|---|---|
| 1967 | Varmeshwar Pandey | Bharatiya Jana Sangh |
| 1969 | Lal Bahadur Singh | Indian National Congress |
| 1974 | Shatarudra Prakash | Bharatiya Kranti Dal |
| 1977 | Shatarudra Prakash | Janata Party |
| 1980 | Mandavi Prasad Singh | Indian National Congress (I) |
| 1985 | Shatarudra Prakash | Lok Dal |
| 1989 | Shatarudra Prakash | Janata Dal |
| 1991 | Jyotsana Srivastava | Bharatiya Janata Party |
| 1993 | Jyotsana Srivastava | Bharatiya Janata Party |
| 1996 | Harish Chandra Srivastava | Bharatiya Janata Party |
| 2002 | Harish Chandra Srivastava | Bharatiya Janata Party |
| 2007 | Jyotsana Srivastava | Bharatiya Janata Party |
| 2012 | Jyotsana Srivastava | Bharatiya Janata Party |
| 2017 | Saurabh Srivastava | Bharatiya Janata Party |
| 2022 | Saurabh Srivastava | Bharatiya Janata Party |

== Election results ==
=== 2027 ===
2027 Uttar Pradesh Legislative Assembly election: Varanasi Cantonment
| Party | Candidate | Votes | % | ±% |
|---|---|---|---|---|
| INDIA | | | | |
| NDA | | | | |
| BSP | | | | |
| NOTA | None of the above | | | |
| Majority | | | | |
| Turnout | | | | |
| gain from | | Swing | | |

=== 2022 ===
2022 Uttar Pradesh Legislative Assembly election: Varanasi Cantonment
| Party | Candidate | Votes | % | ±% |
|---|---|---|---|---|
| BJP | Saurabh Srivastava | 147,833 | 60.63 | +2.37 |
| SP | Pooja Yadav | 60,989 | 25.01 | |
| INC | Rajesh Mishra | 23,807 | 9.76 | −21.56 |
| BSP | Kaushik Pandey | 7,068 | 2.9 | −3.3 |
| NOTA | None of the above | 1,522 | 0.62 | +0.29 |
| Majority | | 86,844 | 35.62 | +8.68 |
| Turnout | | 243,821 | 53.09 | −2.11 |
| BJP hold | | Swing | | |

=== 2017 ===
U. P. Legislative Assembly Election, 2017: Varanasi Cantonment
| Party | Candidate | Votes | % | ±% |
|---|---|---|---|---|
| BJP | Saurabh Srivastava | 132,609 | 58.26 | |
| INC | Anil Srivastava | 71,283 | 31.32 | |
| BSP | Rijwan Ahmad | 14,118 | 6.2 | |
| NOTA | None of the above | 758 | 0.33 | |
| Majority | | 61,326 | 26.94 | |
| Turnout | | 227,600 | 55.2 | |
| BJP hold | | Swing | | |

=== 2012 ===
U. P. Legislative Assembly Election, 2012: Varanasi Cantonment
| Party | Candidate | Votes | % | ±% |
|---|---|---|---|---|
| BJP | Jyotsana Srivastava | 57,918 | 32.05 | |
| INC | Anil Kumar Srivastava | 45,066 | 24.94 | |
| SP | Ashfaq Ahmad | 37,922 | 20.99 | |
| BSP | Chandra Kumar Mishra | 22,162 | 12.27 | |
| QED | Mohammad Saleem | 5,366 | 2.97 | |
| Majority | | 12,852 | 7.11 | |
| Turnout | | 1,80,689 | 51.70 | |
| BJP hold | | Swing | | |

=== 2007 ===
U. P. Legislative Assembly Election, 2007: Varanasi Cantonment
| Party | Candidate | Votes | % | ±% |
|---|---|---|---|---|
| BJP | Jyotsana Srivastava | 31,642 | 26.04 | |
| SP | Manoj Rai | 26,163 | 21.53 | |
| INC | Anil Srivastava | 19,778 | 16.27 | |
| BSP | Raj Kumar Singh | 17,193 | 14.15 | |
| SBSP | Ashfaq Ahmad | 11,787 | 9.70 | |
| Majority | | 5,479 | 4.51 | |
| Turnout | | 1,21,520 | 31.58 | |
| BJP hold | | Swing | | |

=== 2002 ===
U. P. Legislative Assembly Election, 2002: Varanasi Cantonment
| Party | Candidate | Votes | % | ±% |
|---|---|---|---|---|
| BJP | Harish Chandra Srivastava | 41,426 | 31.05 | |
| SP | manoj rai | 28,729 | 21.54 | |
| AD(K) | Mohammad Istaqbal Qureshi | 20,915 | 15.68 | |
| INC | Shatrudra Prakash | 18,041 | 13.52 | |
| BSP | Abhishek Yadav | 15,595 | 11.69 | |
| Majority | | 12,697 | 9.51 | |
| Turnout | | 1,33,405 | 39.26 | |
| BJP hold | | Swing | | |

=== 1996 ===
U. P. Legislative Assembly Election, 1996: Varanasi Cantonment
| Party | Candidate | Votes | % | ±% |
|---|---|---|---|---|
| BJP | Harish Chandra Srivastava | 55,240 | 43.03 | |
| SP | Sunil Kumar Rai | 26,752 | 20.84 | |
| INC | Anil Srivastava | 25,651 | 19.98 | |
| JD | Rajendra Singh | 7,879 | 6.14 | |
| AD(K) | Akaram | 6,360 | 4.95 | |
| Majority | | 28,488 | 22.19 | |
| Turnout | | 1,28,366 | 41.46 | |
| BJP hold | | Swing | | |

=== 1993 ===
U. P. Legislative Assembly Election, 1993: Varanasi Cantonment
| Party | Candidate | Votes | % | ±% |
|---|---|---|---|---|
| BJP | Jyotsana Srivastava | 51,388 | 44.96 | |
| JD | Athar Jamal Lari | 35,388 | 30.96 | |
| SP | Shatrudra Prakash | 13,559 | 11.86 | |
| INC | J. P. Singh | 6,437 | 5.63 | |
| LKD | Meera Yadav | 1,000 | 0.87 | |
| Majority | | 16,000 | 14.00 | |
| Turnout | | 1,14,288 | 48.49 | |
| BJP hold | | Swing | | |

=== 1991 ===
U. P. Legislative Assembly Election, 1991: Varanasi Cantonment
| Party | Candidate | Votes | % | ±% |
|---|---|---|---|---|
| BJP | Jyotsana Srivastava | 31,305 | 37.39 | |
| JD | Athar Jamal Lari | 26,209 | 31.31 | |
| INC | Anil Srivastava | 10,091 | 12.05 | |
| JP | Shatrudra Prakash | 8,200 | 9.79 | |
| BSP | Mansha Ram | 2,792 | 3.34 | |
| Majority | | 5,096 | 6.08 | |
| Turnout | | 83,718 | 39.46 | |
| BJP gain from JD | | Swing | | |

=== 1989 ===
U. P. Legislative Assembly Election, 1989: Varanasi Cantonment
| Party | Candidate | Votes | % | ±% |
|---|---|---|---|---|
| JD | Shatarudra Prakash | 35,173 | 41.88 | |
| INC | Majumdar | 17,111 | 20.37 | |
| BJP | Jyotsana Srivastava | 13,262 | 15.79 | |
| BSP | Mahesh Kumar Yadav | 5,445 | 6.48 | |
| Independent | Pramod | 3,486 | 4.15 | |
| Majority | | 18,062 | 21.51 | |
| Turnout | | 83,988 | 40.32 | |
| JD gain from LKD | | Swing | | |

=== 1985 ===
U. P. Legislative Assembly Election, 1985: Varanasi Cantonment
| Party | Candidate | Votes | % | ±% |
|---|---|---|---|---|
| LKD | Shatarudra Prakash | 17,721 | 32.16 | |
| INC | Ganesh Prasad Jaiswal | 15,414 | 27.97 | |
| BJP | Jeetendra Nath Dubey | 6,538 | 11.86 | |
| CPI | Moti Lal Patel | 3,412 | 6.19 | |
| Independent | Channu Lal Shastri | 2,473 | 4.49 | |
| Majority | | 2,307 | 4.19 | |
| Turnout | | 55,111 | 37.11 | |
| LKD gain from INC(I) | | Swing | | |
