= Varanasi Lok Sabha constituency =

Constituency of the Indian parliament in Uttar Pradesh

Coordinates: 25.32°N 82.99°E

Varanasi UP-77
- Lok Sabha constituency
- Interactive Map Outlining Varanasi Lok Sabha constituency

Constituency details
- Country: India
- Region: North India
- State: Uttar Pradesh
- Assembly constituencies: Rohaniya; Varanasi North; Varanasi South; Varanasi Cantt. Sevapuri
- Established: 1952
- Reservation: None

Member of Parliament
- 18th Lok Sabha
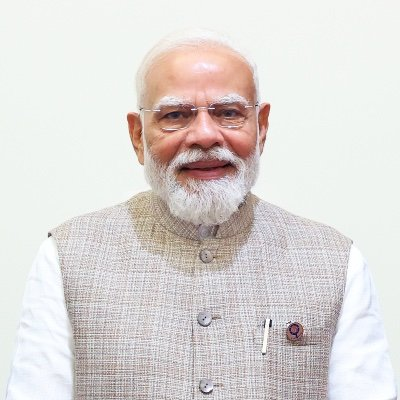
- Incumbent Narendra Modi; Prime Minister of India
- Party: BJP
- Alliance: NDA
- Elected year: 2024
- Preceded by: Murli Manohar Joshi BJP

Varanasi Lok Sabha constituency is one of the 80 Lok Sabha constituencies in the Uttar Pradesh state in India. Narendra Modi has been elected thrice from this constituency to become the Prime Minister of India. His party, the Bharatiya Janata Party (BJP), is the most successful in Varanasi, having won a total of 8 terms since the constituency was established in 1952.

Most successful parties from the Varanasi Lok Sabha constituency
1. BJP (8 times) (44.0%)
2. INC (7 times) (39.0%)
3. CPI(M) (1 time) (6.00%)
4. JD (1 time) (6.00%)
5. JP (1 time) (5.00%)

== Assembly segments ==
No	Name	District	Member	Party	2024 Lead
387	Rohaniya	Varanasi	Sunil Patel	AD(S)	BJP
388	Varanasi North	Varanasi	Ravindra Jaiswal	BJP	BJP
389	Varanasi South	Varanasi	Neelkanth Tiwari	BJP	BJP
390	Varanasi Cantonment	Varanasi	Saurabh Srivastava	BJP	BJP
391	Sevapuri	Varanasi	Neel Ratan Singh Patel	BJP	BJP

== Members of Parliament ==
Year	Member	Party
1952	Raghunath Singh (Note: Central Banaras District)	Indian National Congress
1952	Tribhuvan Narain Singh (Note: Banaras East)	Indian National Congress
1957	Raghunath Singh	Indian National Congress
1962	Raghunath Singh	Indian National Congress
1967	Satya Narain Singh	Communist Party of India (Marxist)
1971	Rajaram Shastri	Indian National Congress
1977	Chandra Shekhar	Janata Party
1980	Kamalapati Tripathi	Indian National Congress (I)
1984	Shyamlal Yadav	Indian National Congress
1989	Anil Shastri	Janata Dal
1991	Shrish Chandra Dikshit	Bharatiya Janata Party
1996	Shankar Prasad Jaiswal	Bharatiya Janata Party
1998	Shankar Prasad Jaiswal	Bharatiya Janata Party
1999	Shankar Prasad Jaiswal	Bharatiya Janata Party
2004	Rajesh Kumar Mishra	Indian National Congress
2009	Murli Manohar Joshi	Bharatiya Janata Party
2014	Narendra Modi	Bharatiya Janata Party
2019	Narendra Modi	Bharatiya Janata Party
2024	Narendra Modi	Bharatiya Janata Party

== Election results ==
Vote share of winning candidates
2024	54.24%
2019	63.62%
2014	56.37%
2009	30.52%
2004	32.68%
1999	33.95%
1998	42.98%
1996	44.62%
1991	41.10%
1989	62.31%
1984	41.58%

=== General election 2024 ===
2024 Indian general elections: Varanasi
Party	Candidate	Votes	%	±%
BJP	Narendra Modi	612,970	54.24	▼9.38
INC	Ajay Rai	460,457	40.74	▲2.36
BSP	Athar Jamal Lari	33,766	2.99	New
NOTA	None of the Above	8,938	1.53	▲0.37
Majority		1,52,513	13.50	▼31.72
Turnout		1,130,143	56.57	▼0.56
Registered electors		1,997,578		
BJP hold		Swing	▼17.87	

Detailed Results at: Election Commission of India

(#): Joint candidate of SP and INC

=== General election 2019 ===
2019 Indian general elections: Varanasi
Party	Candidate	Votes	%	±%
BJP	Narendra Modi	674,664	63.62	▲7.25
SP	Shalini Yadav	195,159	18.40	▲14.01
INC	Ajay Rai	152,548	14.38	▲7.04
NOTA	None of the Above	4,037	0.38	▲0.18
Independent	Atiq Ahmed	855	0.08	New entry
Majority		479,505	45.22	▲9.15
Turnout		1,060,829	57.13	▼1.22
Registered electors		1,856,868		
BJP hold		Swing	▲7.25	

Joined Candidate From SP and BSP.

=== General election 2014 ===
2014 Indian general elections: Varanasi
Party	Candidate	Votes	%	±%
BJP	Narendra Modi	581,022	56.37	▲25.85
AAP	Arvind Kejriwal	209,238	20.30	New
INC	Ajay Rai	75,614	7.34	▼2.64
BSP	Vijay Prakash Jaiswal	60,579	5.88	▼22.06
SP	Kailash Chaurasiya	45,291	4.39	▼14.22
AITC	Indira Tiwari	2,674	0.26	New
NOTA	None of the above	2,051	0.20	New
Majority		371,784	36.07	▲33.49
Turnout		1,030,812	58.35	▲15.74
Registered electors		1,767,486		
BJP hold		Swing	▲25.85	

=== General election 2009 ===
2009 Indian general elections: Varanasi
Party	Candidate	Votes	%	±%
BJP	Murli Manohar Joshi	203,122	30.52	▲6.91
BSP	Mukhtar Ansari	185,911	27.94	▲18.54
SP	Ajay Rai	123,874	18.61	▲9.27
INC	Rajesh Kumar Mishra	66,386	9.98	▼22.70
AD(K)	Vijay Prakash Jaiswal	65,912	9.90	▼4.83
Majority		17,211	2.58	▼6.49
Turnout		665,490	42.61	▲0.06
BJP gain from INC		Swing	▲6.91	

=== General election 2004 ===
2004 Indian general election: Varanasi
Party	Candidate	Votes	%	±%
INC	Rajesh Kumar Mishra	206,904	32.68	▲7.20
BJP	Shankar Prasad Jaiswal	149,468	23.61	▼10.34
AD(K)	Atahar Jamal Lari	93,228	14.73	▲1.39
BSP	Amir Chand Patel	59,518	9.40	▼2.62
SP	Anjana Prakash	59,104	9.34	▼3.24
Independent	Shailendra Kumar	28,533	4.50	N/A
Majority		57,436	9.07	▲0.60
Turnout		633,077	42.55	▼3.53
INC gain from BJP		Swing	▲8.77	

=== General election 1999 ===
1999 Indian general election: Varanasi
Party	Candidate	Votes	%	±%
BJP	Shankar Prasad Jaiswal	211,955	33.95	▼9.03
INC	Rajesh Kumar Mishra	159,096	25.48	▲15.53
AD(K)	Niranjan Rajbhar	83,282	13.34	▲3.18
SP	Salman Bashar	78,442	12.56	N/A
BSP	Babu Lal Patel	75,059	12.02	▼3.64
Majority		52,859	8.47	▼15.09
Turnout		633,826	45.02	▼1.44
BJP hold		Swing		

=== General election 1998 ===
1998 Indian general election: Varanasi
Party	Candidate	Votes	%	±%
BJP	Shankar Prasad Jaiswal	277,232	42.98	▲0.36
CPI(M)	Deena Nath Singh Yadav	125,286	19.42	▼7.30
BSP	Dr. Awdhesh Singh	101,024	15.66	▲3.16
AD(K)	Rajdev Patel	65,529	10.16	▲5.40
INC	Dr. Ratnakar Pandey	64,154	9.95	▲5.94
Majority		151,946	23.56	▲5.66
Turnout		645,044	46.46	▲6.86
BJP hold		Swing		

=== General election 1996 ===
1996 Indian general election: Varanasi
Party	Candidate	Votes	%	±%
BJP	Shankar Prasad Jaiswal	250,991	44.62	▲3.52
CPI(M)	Raj Kishore	150,299	26.72	▼5.46
BSP	Kamala Rajbhar	70,316	12.50	▲5.25
AD(K)	Rajdev Patel	26,797	4.76	New
INC	Doodh Nath Chaturvedi	22,579	4.01	▼8.65
AIIC(T)	Rudra Prasad Singh	7,615	1.35	New
Majority		100,692	17.90	▲8.98
Turnout		562,564	39.60	▼3.70
BJP hold		Swing		

=== General election 1991 ===
1991 Indian general election: Varanasi
Party	Candidate	Votes	%	±%
BJP	Shrish Chandra Dikshit	186,333	41.10	N/A
CPI(M)	Raj Kishore	145,894	32.18	N/A
INC	Lok Pati Tripathi	57,415	12.66	▼9.78
BSP	Kashi Nath Yadav	32,861	7.25	▼0.32
JP	Shiv Devnarain Roy	10,190	2.25	N/A
Majority		40,439	8.92	▼30.95
Turnout		453,402	43.30	▲1.97
BJP gain from JD		Swing		

=== General election 1989 ===
1989 Indian general election: Varanasi
Party	Candidate	Votes	%	±%
JD	Anil Shastri	268,196	62.31	New
INC	Shyamlal Yadav	96,593	22.44	▼19.14
BSP	Ganga Ram Gwal	32,574	7.57	N/A
Independent	Ram Das	12,420	2.89	N/A
DDP	Ram Murat	3,111	0.72	N/A
Majority		171,603	39.87	▲14.22
Turnout		430,403	41.33	▼13.61
JD gain from INC		Swing		

=== General election 1984 ===
1984 Indian general election: Varanasi
Party	Candidate	Votes	%	±%
INC	Shyamlal Yadav	153,076	41.58	−−−
CPI(M)	Udal	58,646	15.93	−−−
JP	Atahar Jamal Lari	50,329	13.67	−−−
BJP	Om Prakash Singh	46,904	12.74	−−−
Lokdal	Gauri Shankar	40,281	10.94	−−−
Majority		94,430	25.65	
Turnout		368,112	54.94	
INC hold		Swing		

== See also ==
- Varanasi district
- Varanasi (Mayoral Constituency)
- List of constituencies of the Lok Sabha

== Notes ==
Lok Sabha
Vacant since 2004 (Prime Minister in Rajya Sabha) Title last held by Lucknow	Constituency represented by the prime minister 2014-present	Incumbent
