= Varanasi Junction railway station =

Railway station in Uttar Pradesh, India

VARANASI JUNCTION Banaras Junction

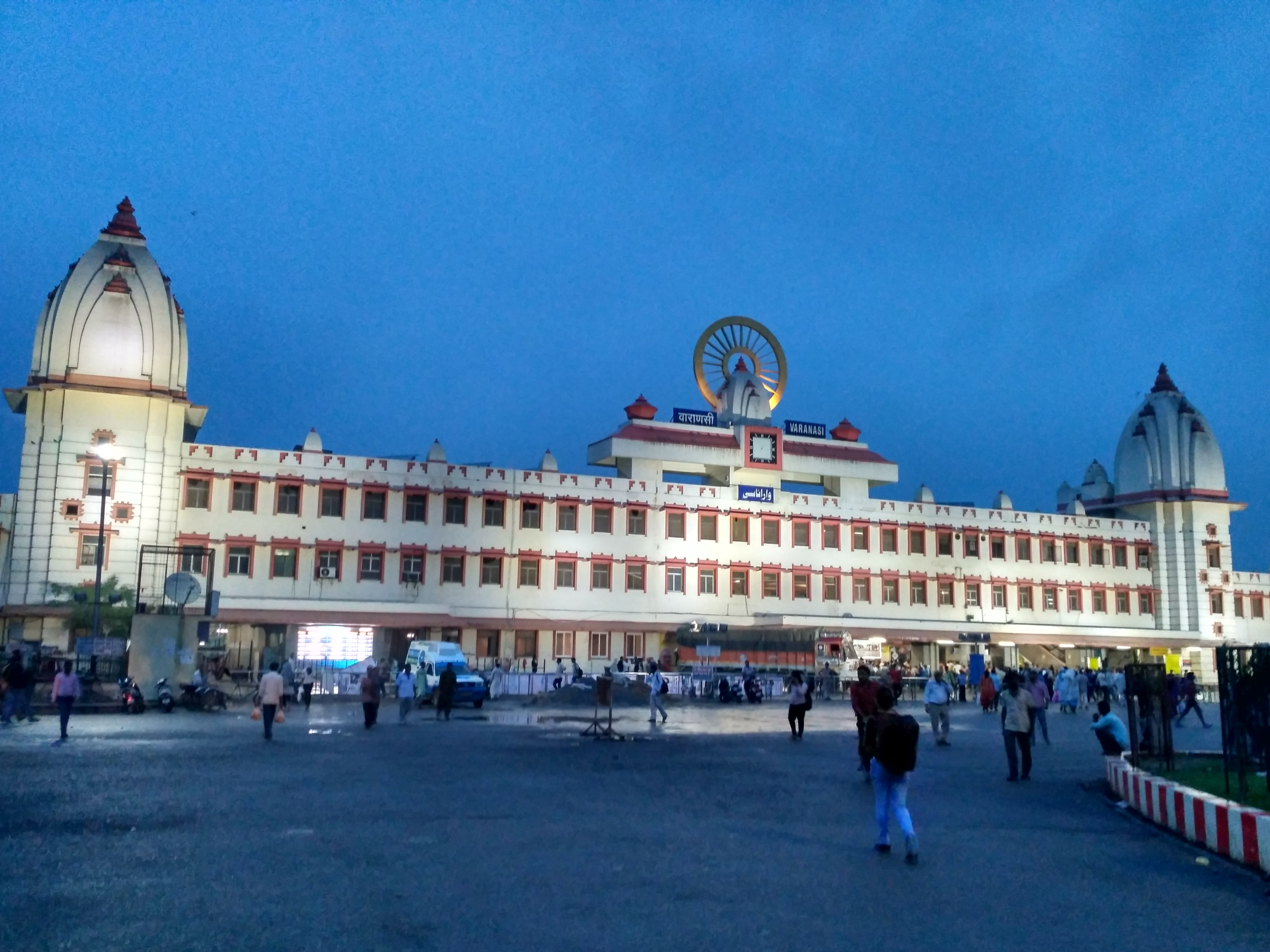

General information
- Location: Varanasi, Varanasi district, Uttar Pradesh; India
- Coordinates: 25°19′37″N 82°59′11″E
- Elevation: 80.71 metres (264.8 ft)
- System: Indian Railways station
- Owner: Indian Railways
- Operator: Indian Railways
- Lines: Varanasi–Ayodhya–Lucknow line, Varanasi–Rae Bareli–Lucknow line, Varanasi–Sultanpur–Lucknow line, Varanasi–Chhapra line, Varanasi-Gyanpur Road-Prayagraj line, Varanasi–Pandit Deen Dayal Upadhyaya line
- Platforms: 11 & 1A (and 1 under construction)
- Tracks: 13
- Connections: Central bus station, Taxi stand, Auto stand, Ropeway (upcoming)

Construction
- Structure type: At grade
- Parking: Available
- Accessible: Yes

Other information
- Status: Functioning
- Station code: BSB
- Zone(s): Northern Railway; North Eastern Railway
- Division(s): Lucknow NR; Varanasi

History
- Opened: 1872; 154 years ago
- Electrified: 2010
- Former names: Banaras Junction

Passengers
- 400,000/day
Location
- Location within Varanasi district Location within Uttar Pradesh Location within India
- Interactive map of Varanasi Junction

Varanasi Junction railway station (station code: BSB) is the main railway station serving the city of Varanasi. The other key railway stations in the Varanasi Metro area are Banaras, Varanasi City, Kashi and Pandit Deen Dayal Upadhyaya Junction. The junction station is sandwiched between the cantonment region and Chetganj region of the city. The station is partially controlled by the Lucknow Division of the Northern Railway Zone and the Varanasi Division of the North Eastern Railway Zone of the Indian Railways. Varanasi Junction railway station nearly reaches the frequency of 300 trains daily. Almost, 29 trains originate and terminate at the station. Premium trains of Indian Railways also originate from the Varanasi Junction, such as Vande Bharat Express, Mahamana Express Rajdhani Express

== History ==
The first line to the temple town was opened from Howrah in 1862. The Chief Engineer of East Indian Railway Company, George Turnbull directed and built the route via Patna. In 1872, a line was added for Lucknow and in 1887, Malviya Bridge was opened to connect the city with Mughalsarai. Also, the bridge connected the Oudh and the Rohilkhand Railway with those of the East India Company at Mughal Sarai.

== Infrastructure ==
The Varanasi Junction railway station has a modern Route Interlock System with an automated signaling system. Varanasi Junction railway station was ranked 14th among 75 busiest A1 category stations on the cleanliness scale. At present, there are 11 platforms while 1 more platform is being constructed to take off the load. Well, the station is equipped with water ATMs, escalators, Wifi, lifts, and many other public conveniences. Due to heavy inflow of tourists from across the country, the railway administration has planned to add the public announcements in other languages such as Tamil, Bengali, Malayalam, Kannada, Odia, Marathi, and Telugu.

== Modernization ==
In 2018, the station was included in the list of 90 stations to be converted into world-class hubs. The redevelopment plan will include the induction of CCTV cameras, Wifi, renovation of the station buildings, modular water kiosks, water, ATMs, LED lights, lifts, escalators, stainless steel benches, and modular catering kiosks. Varanasi Junction railway station is also loaded with rooftop solar panels which can generate up to 600 KW and the administration is planning to add another 1000KW.

== See also ==
- Banaras railway station
- Kashi railway station
- Varanasi City railway station
- Mughalsarai Junction railway station
- Kerakat railway station
