= Sirsaud =

- Village
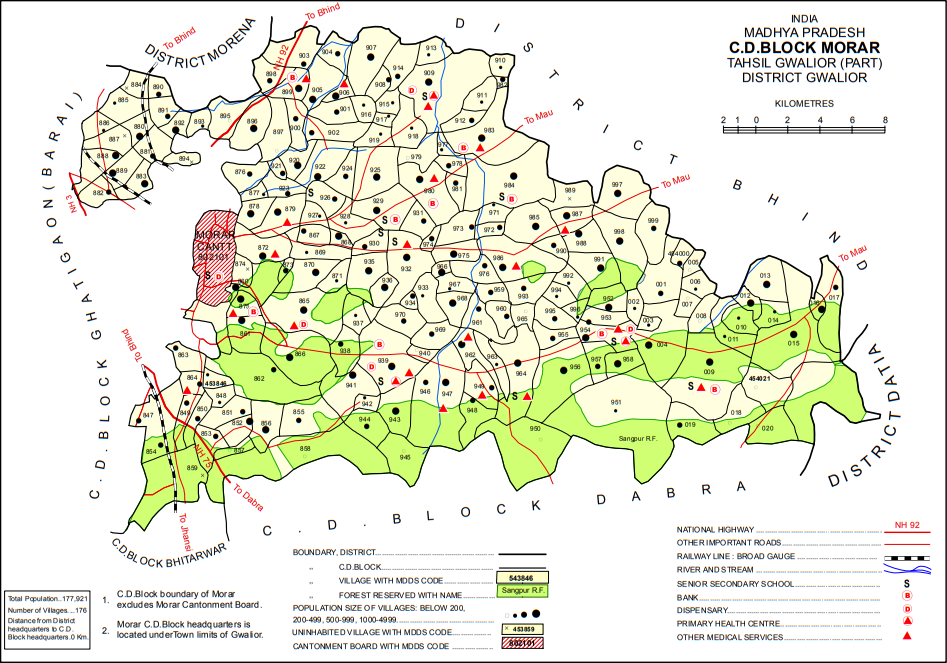
- Map showing Sirsaud (986) in Morar CD block

- Location in Madhya Pradesh, India Sirsaud (India)
- Coordinates: 26°13′N 78°28′E
- Country: India
- State: Madhya Pradesh
- District: Gwalior

Area
  - Total: 12.000 km^{2} (4.633 sq mi)

Population (2011)
  - Total: 3,009
  - Density: 250.8/km^{2} (649.4/sq mi)

Languages
  - Official: Hindi
- Time zone: UTC+5:30 (IST)

Sirsaud (Sirsaud) is a village in Morar block of Gwalior district, in Madhya Pradesh, India. As of 2011, the village population is 3,009, in 523 households.

== History ==
At the beginning of the 20th century, Sirsaud was part of Gwalior State. Located in Pichhore pargana of zila Gird Gwalior, it had a population of 413. Its area was not listed because the village was unsurveyed. The village was held as a jagir.
