= Jakhara =

Jakhara Jakhárá
- Village
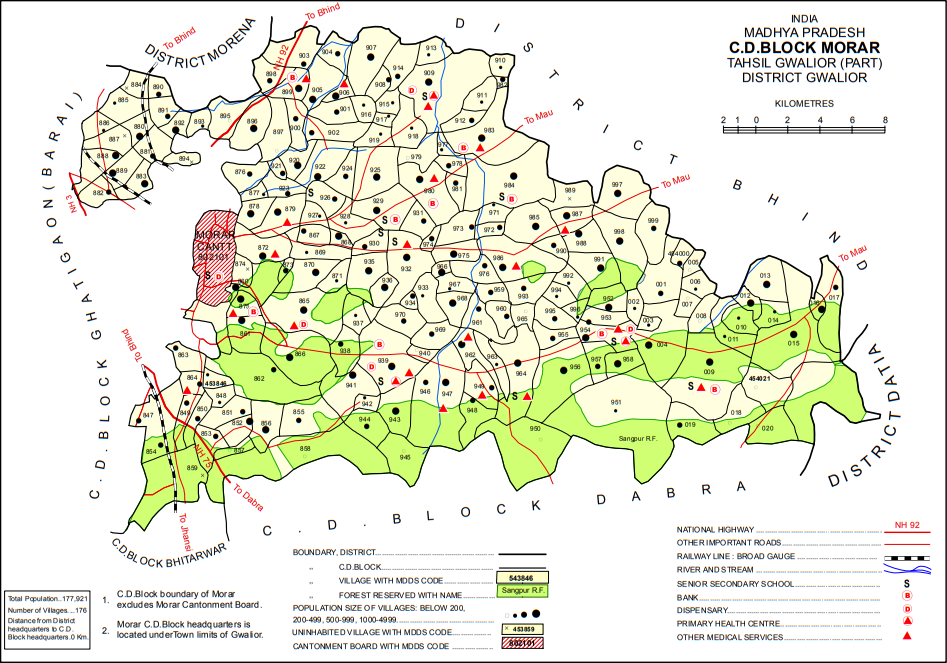
- Map showing Jakhara (987) in Morar CD block

- Location in Madhya Pradesh, India Jakhara (India)
- Coordinates: 26°14′N 78°31′E
- Country: India
- State: Madhya Pradesh
- District: Gwalior

Area
  - Total: 10.371 km^{2} (4.004 sq mi)

Population (2011)
  - Total: 2,096
  - Density: 202.1/km^{2} (523.4/sq mi)

Languages
  - Official: Hindi
- Time zone: UTC+5:30 (IST)

Jakhara (Jakhárá) is a village in Morar block of Gwalior district, in Madhya Pradesh, India. As of 2011, the village population is 2,096, in 369 households.

== History ==
At the beginning of the 20th century, Jakhara was part of Gwalior State. Located in Pichhore pargana of zila Gird Gwalior, it had a population of 713 and an area of 5,901 bighas. The village had a Sayar Naka.
