= Banwar =

Banwar Banwár
- Village
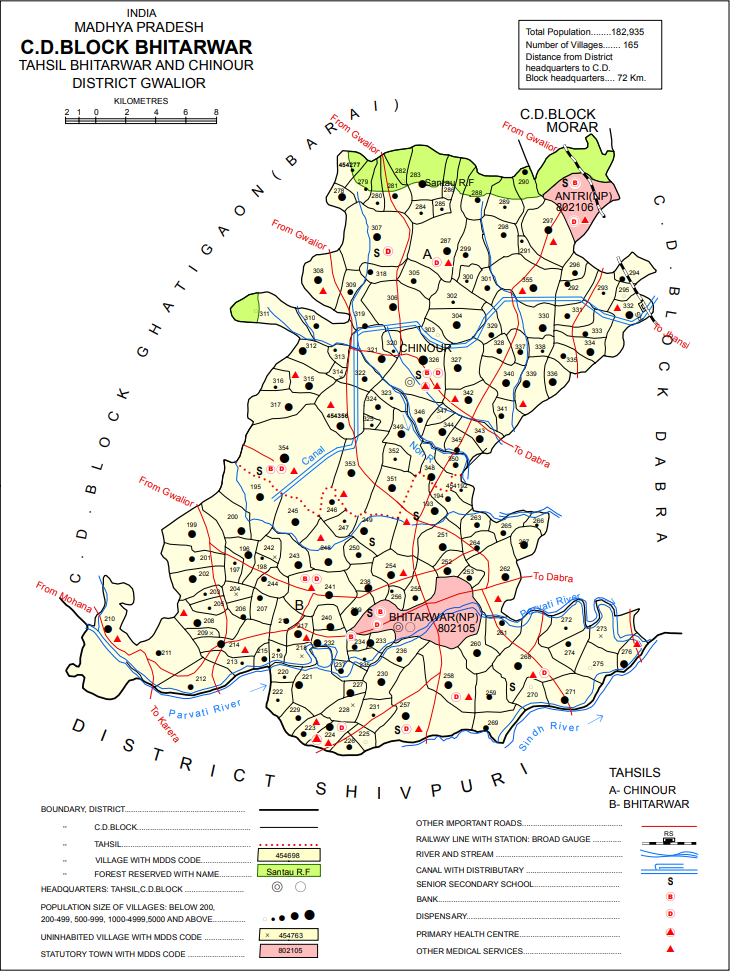
- Map showing Banwar (307) in Bhitarwar CD block

- Location in Madhya Pradesh, India Banwar (India)
- Coordinates: 26°2′N 78°7′E
- Country: India
- State: Madhya Pradesh
- District: Gwalior

Area
  - Total: 17.663 km^{2} (6.820 sq mi)

Population (2011)
  - Total: 4,209
  - Density: 238.3/km^{2} (617.2/sq mi)

Languages
  - Official: Hindi
- Time zone: UTC+5:30 (IST)

Banwar (Banwár) is a village in Bhitarwar block of Gwalior district, in Madhya Pradesh, India. As of 2011, the village population was 4,209, in 769 households. There is a weekly haat in the village.

== History ==
At the beginning of the 20th century, Banwar was part of Gwalior State. Located in Pichhore pargana of zila Gird Gwalior, it had a population of 1,253 and an area of 8,631 bighas. The village had a school and a Sayar Naka.
