= Kasba Badlu =

- Village
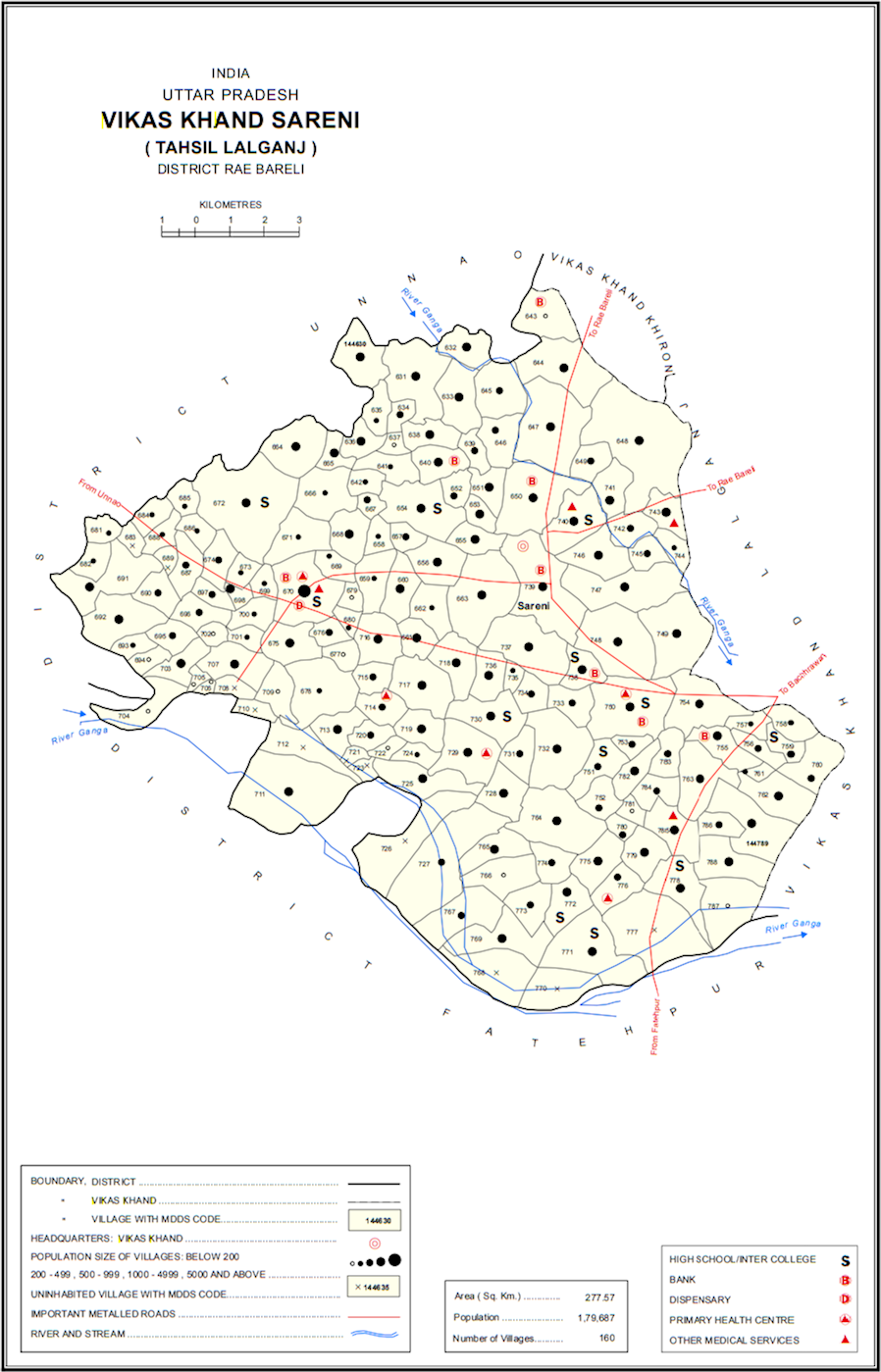
- Map showing Kasba Badlu (#714) in Sareni CD block

- Location in Uttar Pradesh, India
- Coordinates: 26.113122°N 80.776021°E
- Country: India
- State: Uttar Pradesh
- District: Raebareli

Area
  - Total: 1.048 km^{2} (0.405 sq mi)

Population (2011)
  - Total: 695
  - Density: 663/km^{2} (1,720/sq mi)

Languages
  - Official: Hindi
- Time zone: UTC+5:30 (IST)
- Vehicle registration: UP-35

Kasba Badlu is a village in Sareni block of Rae Bareli district, Uttar Pradesh, India. It is located 24 km from Lalganj, the tehsil headquarters. As of 2011, it has a population of 695 people, in 120 households. It has one primary school and a primary health centre, and it does not host a weekly haat or a permanent market. It belongs to the nyaya panchayat of Nibi.

The 1951 census recorded Kasba Badlu (as "Qasba Badlu") as comprising 1 hamlet, with a total population of 235 people (123 male and 112 female), in 42 households and 30 physical houses. The area of the village was given as 254 acres. 37 residents were literate, all male. The village was listed as belonging to the pargana of Sareni and the thana of Sareni.

The 1961 census recorded Kasba Badlu (as "Qasba Badlu") as comprising 1 hamlet, with a total population of 269 people (123 male and 146 female), in 51 households and 40 physical houses. The area of the village was given as 254 acres and it had a medical practitioner at that point.

The 1981 census recorded Kasba Badlu (as "Qasba Badlu") as having a population of 389 people, in 65 households, and having an area of 104.14 hectares. The main staple foods were given as wheat and rice.

The 1991 census recorded Kasba Badlu as having a total population of 440 people (209 male and 231 female), in 80 households and 80 physical houses. The area of the village was listed as 103 hectares. Members of the 0-6 age group numbered 85, or 19% of the total; this group was 44% male (37) and 46% female (48). Members of scheduled castes made up 48% of the village's population, while no members of scheduled tribes were recorded. The literacy rate of the village was 43% (121 men and 68 women). 131 people were classified as main workers (89 men and 42 women), while 0 people were classified as marginal workers; the remaining 309 residents were non-workers. The breakdown of main workers by employment category was as follows: 55 cultivators (i.e. people who owned or leased their own land); 88 agricultural labourers (i.e. people who worked someone else's land in return for payment); 0 workers in livestock, forestry, fishing, hunting, plantations, orchards, etc.; 0 in mining and quarrying; 0 household industry workers; 2 workers employed in other manufacturing, processing, service, and repair roles; 0 construction workers; 0 employed in trade and commerce; 0 employed in transport, storage, and communications; and 6 in other services.
