= Berja, Gwalior =

Berja Berjá
- Village
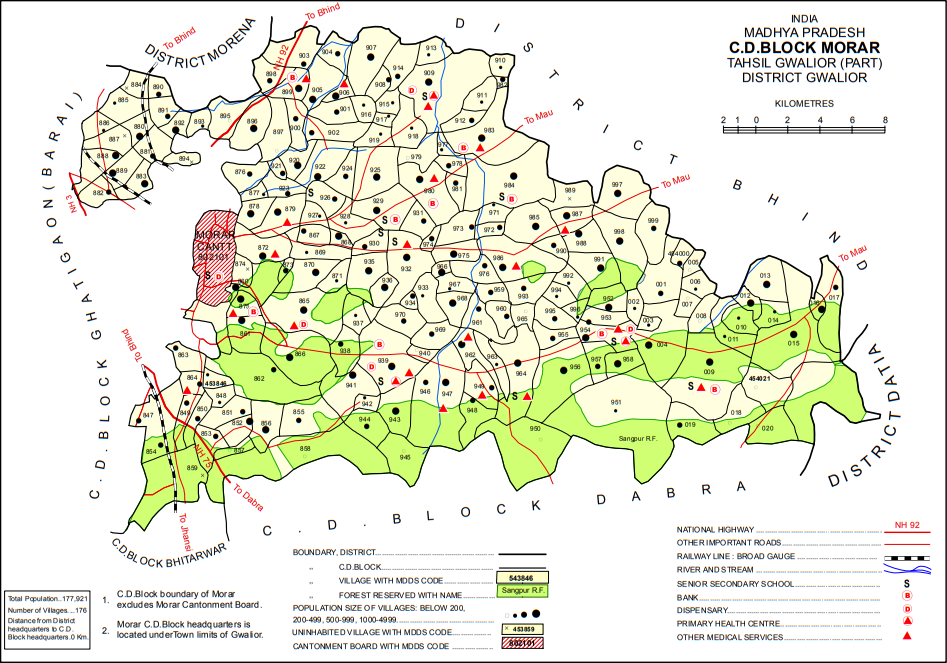
- Map showing Berja (980) in Morar CD block

- Location in Madhya Pradesh, India Berja (India)
- Coordinates: 26°15′39″N 78°21′40″E
- Country: India
- State: Madhya Pradesh
- District: Gwalior

Area
  - Total: 9.231 km^{2} (3.564 sq mi)

Population (2011)
  - Total: 1,963
  - Density: 212.7/km^{2} (550.8/sq mi)

Languages
  - Official: Hindi
- Time zone: UTC+5:30 (IST)

Berja (Berjá) is a village in Morar block of Gwalior district, in Madhya Pradesh, India. As of 2011, the village population is 1,963, in 346 households.

== History ==
At the beginning of the 20th century, Berja was part of Gwalior State. Located in the pargana and zila of Gird Gwalior, it had a population of 418 and an area of 5,492 bighas.
