= State Highway 3 (Madhya Pradesh) =

Road in Madhya Pradesh, India

State Highway 3

Major junctions
- North end: Gwalior
- Chinor, Chimak, Bagwai, Bhitarwar, Karera, Sirsod
- South end: Pichhore

Location
- Country: India
- State: Madhya Pradesh

Highway system
- Roads in India; Expressways; National; State; Asian; State Highways in Madhya Pradesh

Madhya Pradesh State Highway 3 (MP SH 3) is a state highway running from Gwalior until Picchore via Chinor, Chimak, Bagwai, Bhitarwar, Karera, Sirsod.

The highway connects various important towns in Northern Madhya Pradesh.

== See also ==
- List of state highways in Madhya Pradesh
