= Akbai Badi =

Akbai badi Akabai badi akbai garhi (pichhore)
- Village Town
- Location in Madhya Pradesh, India Akbai badi (India)
- Coordinates: 25.89°N 78.34°E
- Country: India
- State: Madhya Pradesh
- District: Gwalior
- Tehsil: Dabra

Population (2011)
  - Total: 4,200
- Time zone: UTC+5:30 (IST)
- Postal code: 475005
- Vehicle registration: MP-07
- Vidhan Sabha constituency: Dabra
- Lok Sabha constituency: Gwalior
- Website: mp.gov.in

Akbai Badi is a Village town and a nagar panchayat in Dabra (Pichhore) tehsil in Gwalior district in the state of Madhya Pradesh, India.

== Geography ==
Akbai Badi is located at 25.9°N 78.33°E. It has an average elevation of 201 metres (659 feet).

== Demographics ==
As of 2011 India census, akbai badi had a population of 4200. Males constitute 58% of the population and females 42%. B Akbai badi has an average literacy rate of 87%, higher than the national average of 59.5%; with 65% of the males and 35% of females literate. 20% of the population is under 6 years of age.

== History ==
The Jat landlord Shri Gokul Singh left from Achhnera district Agra and reached village Rora Gwalior, where Shri Chakrapan ji made Rora his residence. From Rora, Jaskaran ji Akbari reached big. At that time Gwalior was ruled by Raja Mansingh Tomar. Shri Jaskaran ji was given the title of Chaudhary by him. Jaskaran ji's son Pratap Singh had got the construction work of Chhatri, Kua, Babri, Ponds, Garhi done in Akbari Badi. It is a matter of time - Pratap Singh's son Hamir Singh reached Bilheti, from there he went to Bhelkalang. At present, Kok Singh, son of Chaudhary Hukam Singh, son of Devi Singh, is present in Bhelakalan.
