= Gowai =

Gowai Gowaí
- Village
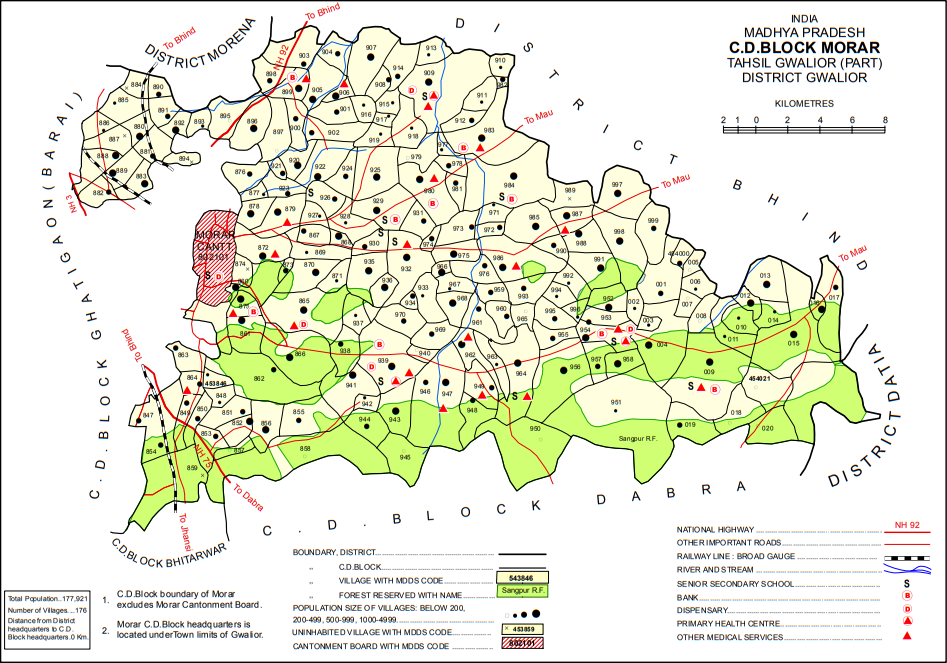
- Map showing Gowai (978) in Morar CD block

- Location in Madhya Pradesh, India Gowai (India)
- Coordinates: 26°16′N 78°26′E
- Country: India
- State: Madhya Pradesh
- District: Gwalior

Area
  - Total: 4.395 km^{2} (1.697 sq mi)

Population (2011)
  - Total: 928
  - Density: 211/km^{2} (547/sq mi)

Languages
  - Official: Hindi
- Time zone: UTC+5:30 (IST)

Gowai (Gowaí) is a village in Morar block of Gwalior district, in Madhya Pradesh, India. As of 2011, the village population was 928, in 226 households.

== History ==
At the beginning of the 20th century, Gowai was part of Gwalior State. Located in the pargana and zila of Gird Gwalior, it had a population of 126 and an area of 2,074 bighas.
