= Kashi Khera =

Kashi Khera Kāshi Khera
- Village
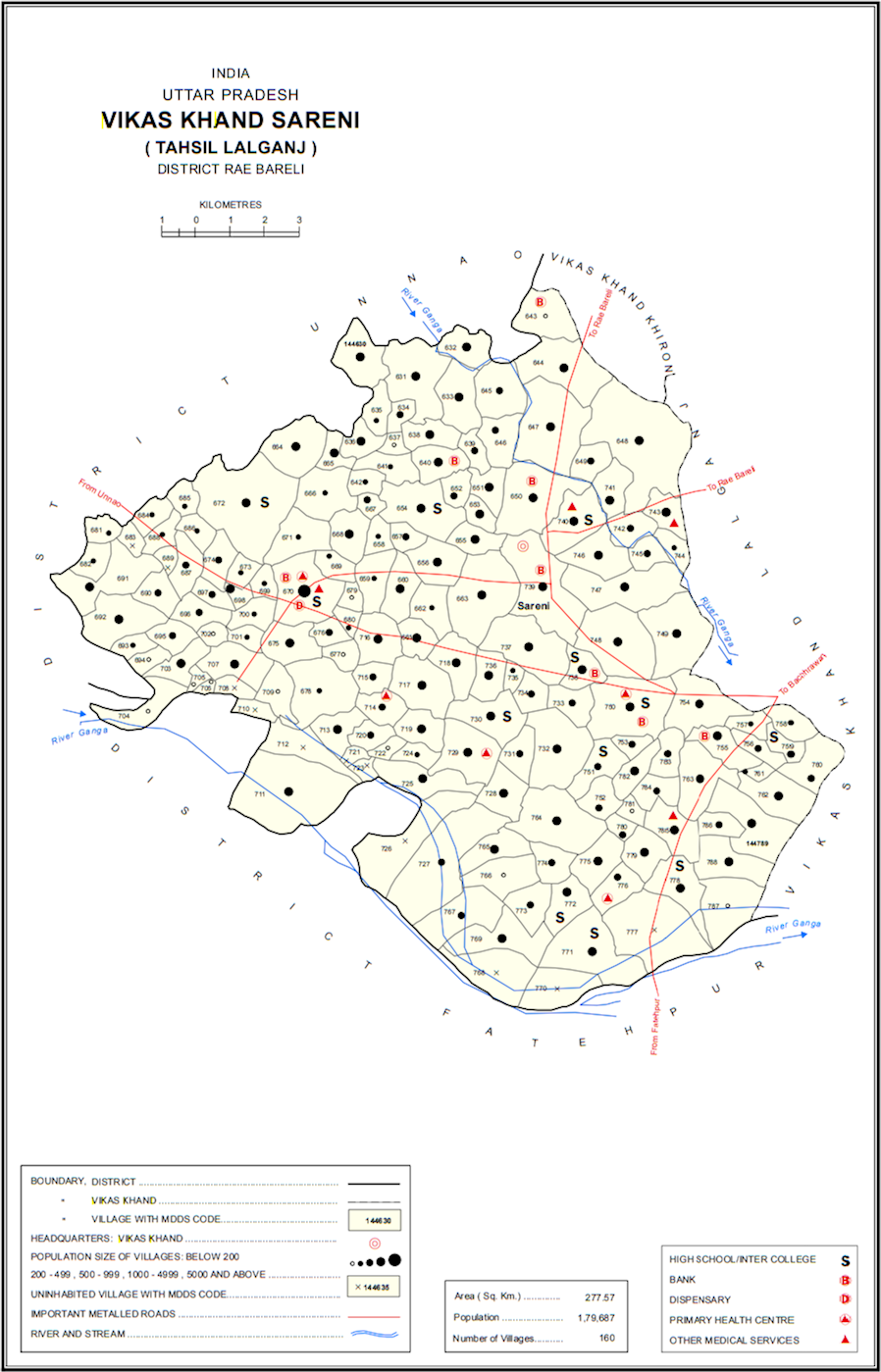
- Map showing Kashi Khera (#715) in Sareni CD block

- Location in Uttar Pradesh, India
- Coordinates: 26.122953°N 80.775332°E
- Country: India
- State: Uttar Pradesh
- District: Raebareli

Area
  - Total: 0.632 km^{2} (0.244 sq mi)

Population (2011)
  - Total: 708
  - Density: 1,120/km^{2} (2,900/sq mi)

Languages
  - Official: Hindi
- Time zone: UTC+5:30 (IST)
- Vehicle registration: UP-35

Kashi Khera is a village in Sareni block of Rae Bareli district, in Uttar Pradesh state in northern India. It is located 28 km from Lalganj, the tehsil headquarters. As of 2011, it has a population of 708 people, in 126 households. It has one primary school and no healthcare facilities, and does not host a weekly haat or a permanent market. It belongs to the nyaya panchayat of Nibi.

The 1951 census recorded Kashi Khera as comprising 1 hamlet, with a population of 386 people (183 male and 203 female), in 62 households and 53 physical houses. The area of the village was given as 162 acres. 48 residents were literate, 46 male and 2 female. The village was listed as belonging to the pargana of Sareni and the thana of Sareni.

The 1961 census recorded Kashi Khera as comprising 1 hamlet, with a population of 365 people (169 male and 196 female), in 60 households and 53 physical houses. The area of the village was given as 162 acres.

The 1981 census recorded Kashi Khera as having a population of 457 people, in 87 households, and having an area of 63.55 hectares. The main staple foods were given as wheat and rice.

The 1991 census recorded Kashi Khera as having a total population of 604 people (327 male and 277 female), in 97 households and 97 physical houses. The area of the village was listed as 52 hectares. Members of the 0-6 age group numbered 95, or 16% of the total; this group was 52% male (49) and 48% female (46). Members of scheduled castes made up 18% of the village's population, while no members of scheduled tribes were recorded. The literacy rate of the village was 48% (191 men and 100 women). 204 people were classified as main workers (175 men and 29 women), while 51 people were classified as marginal workers (9 male and 42 female); the remaining 349 residents were non-workers. The breakdown of main workers by employment category was as follows: 75 cultivators (i.e. people who owned or leased their own land); 103 agricultural labourers (i.e. people who worked someone else's land in return for payment); 1 worker in livestock, forestry, fishing, hunting, plantations, orchards, etc.; 0 in mining and quarrying; 1 household industry worker; 2 workers employed in other manufacturing, processing, service, and repair roles; 2 construction workers; 6 employed in trade and commerce; 2 employed in transport, storage, and communications; and 12 in other services.
