= Turakpura =

Turakpura Turakpurá
- Village
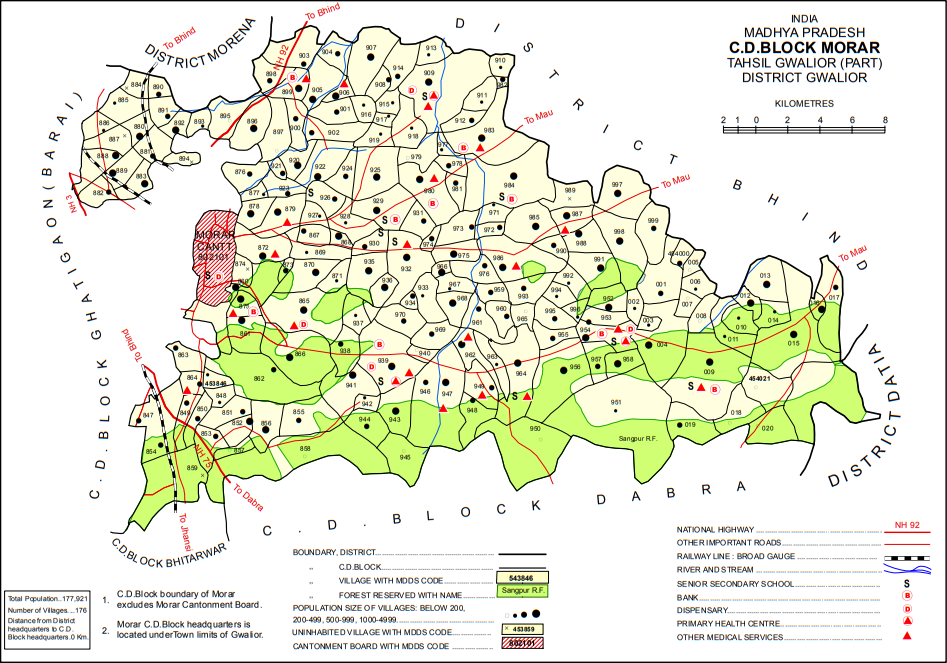
- Map showing Turakpura (979) in Morar CD block

- Location in Madhya Pradesh, India Turakpura (India)
- Coordinates: 26°17′N 78°30′E
- Country: India
- State: Madhya Pradesh
- District: Gwalior

Area
  - Total: 1.513 km^{2} (0.584 sq mi)

Population (2011)
  - Total: 167
  - Density: 110/km^{2} (286/sq mi)

Languages
  - Official: Hindi
- Time zone: UTC+5:30 (IST)

Turakpura (Turakpurá) is a village in Morar block of Gwalior district, in Madhya Pradesh, India. As of 2011, the village population is 167, in 43 households.

== History ==
At the beginning of the 20th century, Turakpura was part of Gwalior State. Located in the pargana and zila of Gird Gwalior, it had a population of 40 and an area of 680 bighas.
