= Morar Cantonment =

- Cantonment town
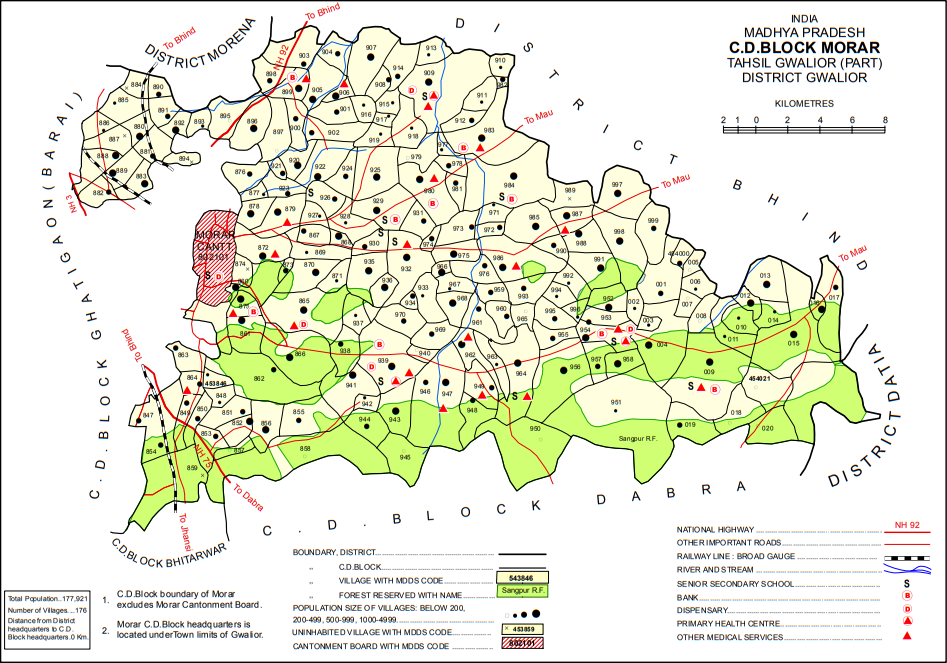
- Map of Morar CD block

- Location in Madhya Pradesh, India Morar Cantonment (India)
- Coordinates: 26°12′56″N 78°14′27″E
- Country: India
- State: Madhya Pradesh
- District: Gwalior

Area
  - Total: 59 km^{2} (23 sq mi)

Population (2011)
  - Total: 48,464
  - Rank: 193
  - Density: 820/km^{2} (2,100/sq mi)

Languages
  - Official: Hindi
- Time zone: UTC+5:30 (IST)
- ISO 3166 code: IN-MP
- Vehicle registration: MP
- Website: https://morar.cantt.gov.in/

Morar Cantonment is a cantonment town in Gwalior district in the Indian state of Madhya Pradesh. It is part of an urban agglomeration together with neighbouring Gwalior. Adv. Rakesh Singh Chauhan is the longest-serving former chairman and vice-president of Cantonment Board Morar.

Morar is also a community development block, which has its headquarters at Gwalior. As of 2011, the block's population is 177,921, in 33,511 households.

== Demographics ==
As of the 2011 Census of India, Morar Cantonment had a population of 48,464. Males constitute 57% of the population and females 43%. Morar Cantonment has an average literacy rate of 83%, higher than the state average of 69%: male literacy is 87%, and female literacy is 69%. In Morar 13% of the population are children up to 6 years of age.

== Government ==
Morar Cantonment forms one constituency, Gwalior Rural, in the state legislative assembly, the "Madhya Pradesh Vidhan Sabha".

== Gwalior Military Station ==
Morar Cantonment is home to several units of the Indian Army. There are a number of static and mobile units housed within its confines.

=== History ===
The Gwalior Military Station has its origins in the colonial era, established by the British to secure their hold over the central regions of India. Post-independence, the military station was restructured to align with the operational needs of the Indian Army. Over the decades, it has evolved into a well-equipped facility, playing a significant role in military operations and training.

== Villages ==
Morar block has 176 rural villages, listed below:

Village name	Total land area (hectares)	Population (in 2011)
Lakhnotikalan	190	453
Turari	285.2	766
Lakhnotikhurd	214.4	446
Nagor	233.9	862
Sikroda Badori	213.9	525
Rawar	347.8	606
Adupurajagir	199.2	1,021
Sikrodi	70.6	671
Badori	221.3	544
Bastari	464.4	892
Rora	1,709.9	2,505
Londra	148.2	95
Alinagar	157.4	164
Dangsarkar	3,048.4	0
Sirol	458.7	3,302
Jarga	1,086.6	1,441
Nainagiri	186.8	924
Habipura	227.8	566
Ramaua	259.6	983
Bandholi	1,059.6	1,931
Sonsa	1,625.8	1,979
Kheriya Modi	200.5	889
Ganeshpura	71	1,053
Sunarpura Khalsa	258.9	360
Udaipur	372.5	1,186
Hiri	211.5	371
Badagaon	962.5	2,676
Singharpura	84.5	725
Mohanpur	69.1	0
Mohnpur (Murar)	281.9	2,429
Jiraina	308.8	576
Bhatpura (Brahman)	143	365
Kheriya Pdyapur	41.5	2,033
Khureri	577.5	2,020
Bhadroli	464.1	2,063
Vikrampur	193.9	906
Akbarpur	128.6	603
Mau	419	1,557
Cakjugrupur	34.9	0
Madanpur	152.2	290
Jugrupur	65.9	313
Dondiyapur	64.7	0
Jamahar	391.3	2,459
Jlalpur	152.2	1,915
Kuwrpur	180.9	594
Cakrampur	202.4	953
Senthri	622	1,534
Bhonderi	236.8	237
Sahnpur	67.5	0
Sonapura	395.2	185
Girgaw	698.8	1,970
Shekhpura	318.8	140
Laxmangarh	139.6	553
Baretha	579.6	1,395
Kheriya Mirdha	267.7	680
Chandupura	363.4	542
Suro	383.7	916
Kheriya Keshar	287.8	794
Siholi	275.9	775
Dangguthina	416.4	1,007
Guthina	669	1,365
Bahadurpur	901.6	1,960
Phoolpura	229.6	508
Parsen	1,980.5	4,094
Manpur (Kakrari)	206.6	233
Himapur	261.1	229
Sunarpura Mafi	284.7	706
Khodupura	202	266
Saraspura	391	723
Adupura Khalsa	176.8	426
Dongarpur Tal	232	298
Surajpura	189.6	416
Sumerpada	208.8	292
Jagupura	123.3	304
Behata	771.3	1,653
Maithana	144.6	653
Chak Keshopur	273.7	1,911
Jahangirpur	294.1	952
Birampura	451.9	682
Siroli	620.3	1,661
Dhaneli	470.8	958
Karigawan	122	453
Banarpura	104.1	227
Ratwai	981.6	2,303
Rai	376.3	918
Bhelakalan	245.9	762
Bijoli	966.3	2,964
Khargu Kheda	105.7	214
Bahangikalan	425.6	741
Soni	810.7	1,405
Mugalpura	219.7	1,098
Sihara	351.7	387
Bandha	455	556
Utila	1,286.5	4,004
Manpur Arroli	438.3	90
Bhatpura Sani	581.1	1,056
Kui	303.4	495
Gurri	630.3	2,106
Dagrau	314.6	933
Jinsikhan	666.9	1
Dwarkaganj	238.2	3,613
Tiholi	2,392	3,613
Nidhawali	492.5	976
Tankoli	448.8	956
Singhpur	1,950.8	103
Jamroha	2,596.4	472
Fusawali	1,015.1	1,308
Chakmaharajpur	192	957
Hastanapur	304.1	2,256
Mehroli	183.8	956
Aroli	1,278.8	1,917
Tor	280.9	998
Mukhtyarpur	428.7	1,083
Ganpatpura	222	780
Chhondi	255.5	694
Sakatpura	339.4	822
Baderafutkar	610.4	1,664
Dhanwai	309.9	382
Dabka	1,274	2,213
Laduapura	99.2	22
Syawari	328.3	1,062
Kaimpura	133.8	286
Duhiya	587.6	1,621
Arroli	120.3	633
Bahangikhurd	414.3	955
Supat	183.7	345
Khedi	221.8	544
Kheda	243.4	703
Bhelakhurd	112	663
Ikehara	429.7	1,511
Santalpur	145.2	899
Chandpura	209.8	389
Gowai	439.5	928
Turakpura	151.3	167
Berja	923.1	1,963
Rashidpur	173.3	748
Kakrari	189.9	576
Bilheti	1,060.7	4,021
Supawali	1,596.4	2,776
Dayeli	571	1,056
Sirsaud	1,200	3,009
Jakhara	1,037.1	2,096
Kripalpur	202.4	1,010
Dangsarkar	133.1	0
Sikroda Futkar	236	503
Chaproli	496	1,494
Narayanpur	181	323
Bhavanpura	181	753
Chaksonpura	219.4	340
Kirawali	357.7	744
Dangora	170	242
Bilara	813.4	1,919
Gundhara	840.6	2,906
Jiganiya	503.7	896
Benipura	191.6	890
Arora	790.1	773
Lakhapura	161.8	307
Ripuapura	306	387
Sumawali	970.5	1,178
Ari	93.5	171
Luharpura	135.4	312
Harpura	135.4	68
Harjanpura	139.4	69
Behat	1,600.8	4,735
Ikona	377.5	390
Gunjna	570.4	444
Gadroli	140.2	1,236
Dangiyapura	738.3	2,271
Madha	254.3	217
Rangawan	1,604.4	2,181
Ghusgawan	187.5	1,158
Tiktoli	222.7	570
Jindpura	556.7	21
Rahwali	2,014.9	580
Amai	742.6	11
Sujhar	1,850.3	44

== Notable people ==
- John Sparks (1873–1920), cricketer and Royal Navy officer
