= Dabra, Madhya Pradesh =

Dabra
- Town
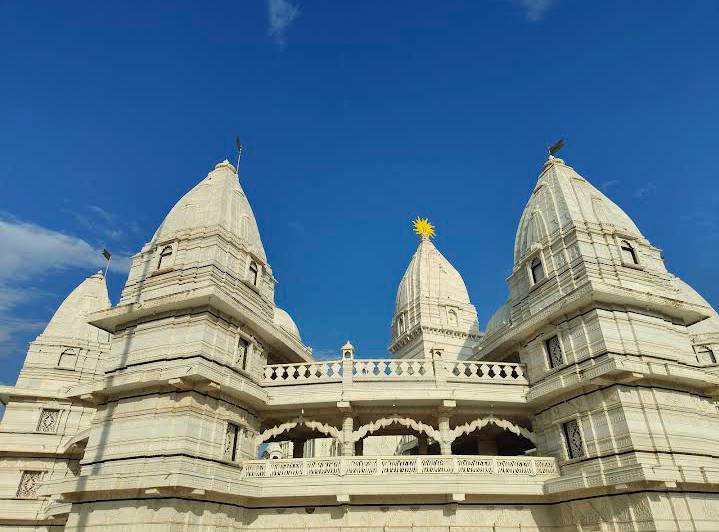
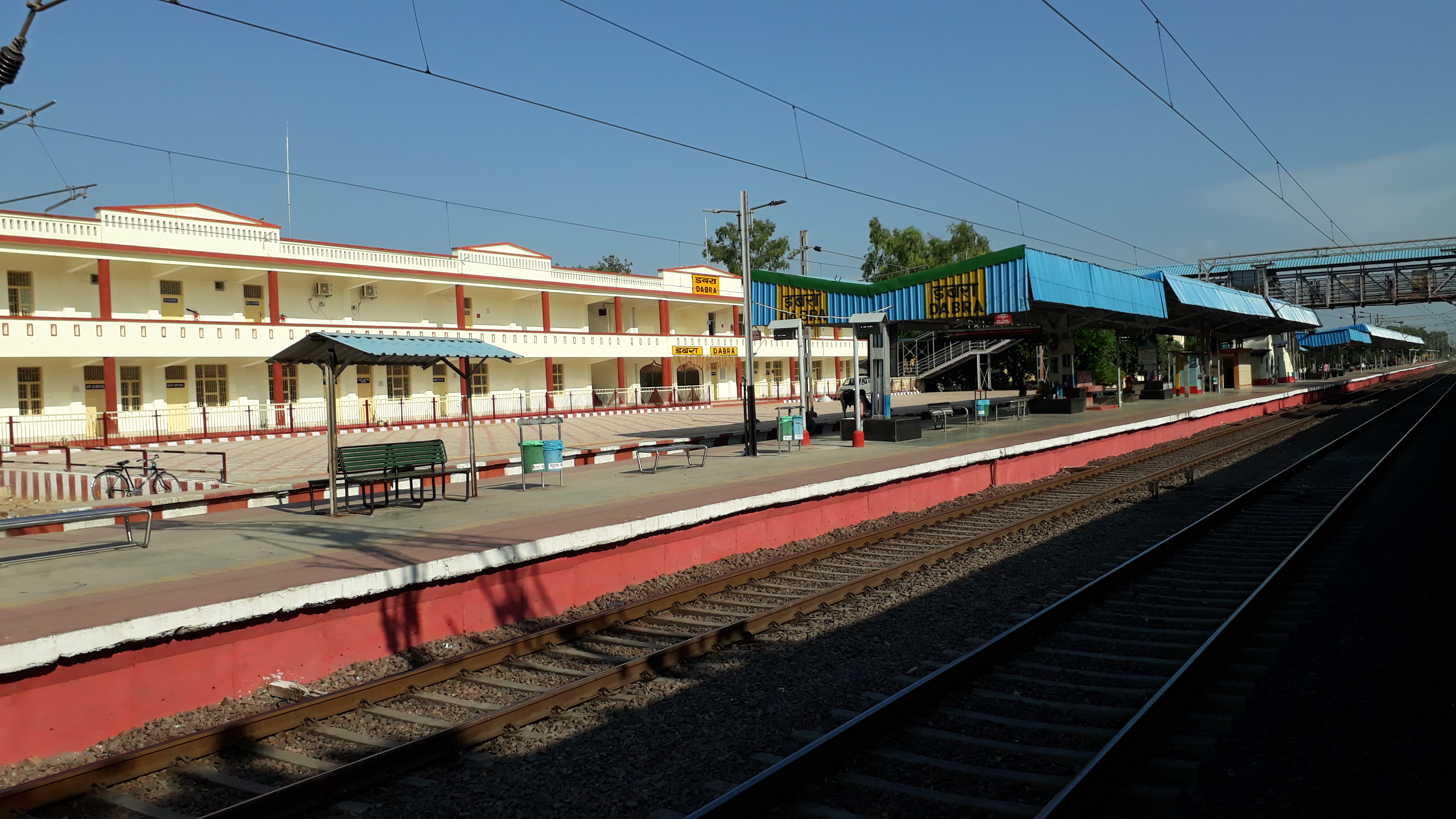
- Navgrah Mandir Dabra Dabra Railway Station

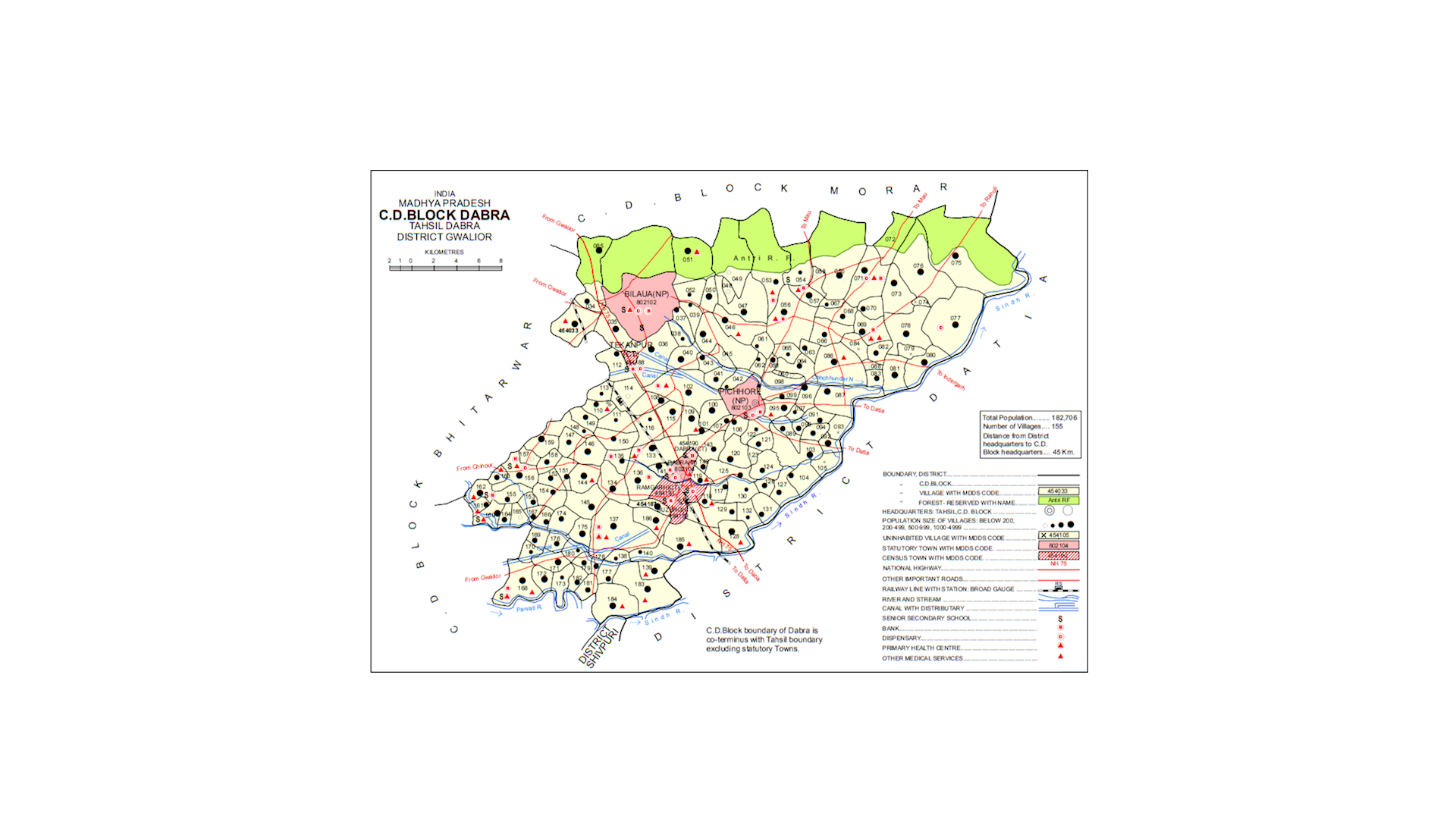
- Map of Dabra tehsil and CD block

- Location in Madhya Pradesh, India
- Coordinates: 25.89°N 78.33°E
- Country: India
- State: Madhya Pradesh
- District: Gwalior

Government
  - Body: Dabra Municipal

Languages
  - Official: Hindi
- Time zone: UTC+5:30 (IST)
- PIN: 475110
- Telephone code: 07524
- Vehicle registration: MP-07

Dabra (Hindi: डबरा) is a town and municipality in Gwalior district in the state of Madhya Pradesh, India located near National Highway 44 (NH-44). It is known for its cascading landscape and production of dhaan, a type of rice. It serves as the headquarters for both a tehsil and a coterminous community development block.

Dabra is the largest municipality in Madhya Pradesh, with the Sind River located 5 km (3 mi) away. Sonagir, a Jain pilgrimage, and Datia, an ancient town, are located 16 km (10 mi) and 32 km (20 mi) from Dabra respectively. Other nearby places of interest are the Temple of Bamrauli Hanuman Ji, the Dhumeshwar Mahadev Temple, the Baba Thakur Temple, the Vankhandeshwar Mahadev Mandir and the tomb of Pir Baba. Abul Fazal, one of Akbar's navratnas (nine gems), on the behest of Jahangir by Vir Singh Deo, raja of Orchha, was killed and buried in a tomb at Antri (31 km (19 mi) from Dabra towards Gwalior).

Navagraha Temple (also known as Navgrah Mandir or Navgrah Shakti Peeth) is a prominent modern Hindu temple dedicated to the Navagraha (nine celestial bodies/planets). Claimed to be Asia's largest Navagraha temple, it spans over 12 acres and features idols of all nine planets along with their consorts, a unique feature.

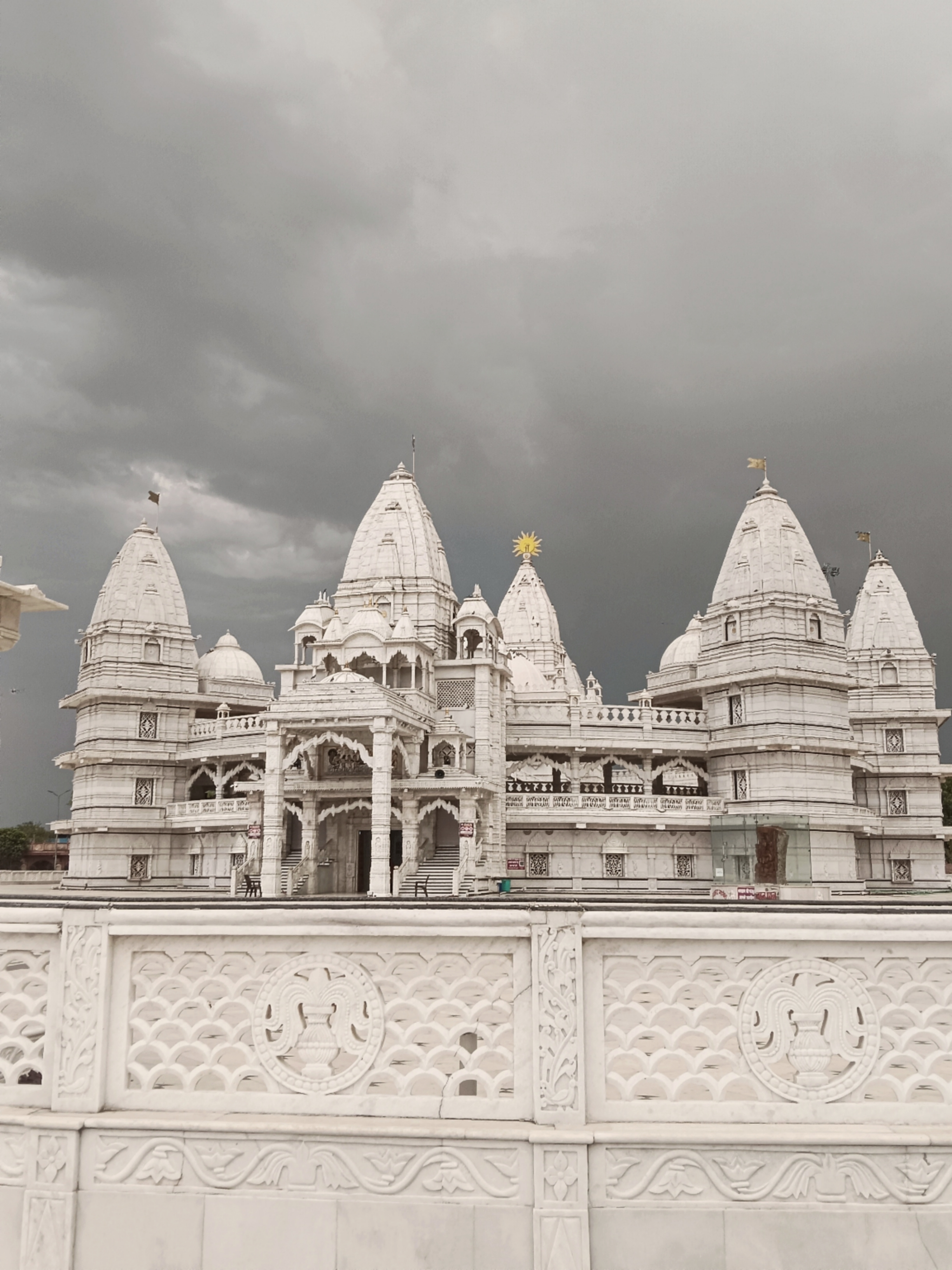
Shri Navgraha Shaktipeeth, Dabra Madhya Pradesh

The temple incorporates Dravidian architecture coupled with Vastu Shastra and Jyotish principles, established on the sacred number 108. It serves as a major pilgrimage site for devotees seeking astrological remedies, planetary peace, and spiritual solace. The Pran Pratishtha (consecration) was held in February 2026.

It is located near Magrora in Dabra, therefore increasing its accessibility and growth in attraction alongside other local temples.

== Education ==
Dabra has schools for primary and secondary education (affiliated with CBSE/ICSE/MP Boards).

- IPS Higher Secondary School Dabra
- Kendriya Vidyalaya Dabra
- Cambridge School
- St. Peter's School
- Mangla Higher Secondary School
- Shri ram school thakur baba dabra
- Daisy Moral Higher Secondary School
- Sant Kanwar Ram Higher Secondary School
- Shri Guru Nanak Public Higher Secondary School
- Central Academy High School
- Global International Public School
- Saraswati Shishu Mandir
- DAV Higher Secondary School
- Vankhandeshwar Higher Secondary School
- Mahatma Jyotirao Phuley Convent School
- Bal Shramik Vishesh Vidyalaya
- Balaji Public School
- Indian International Public School

=== Higher education ===
- Government Vrandasahay PG College
- Government Polytechnic College, Dabra

== Medical facilities ==
Dabra has a 100-bed government civil hospital and various private hospitals to serve health-related issues.

== Transportation ==
=== Railways ===
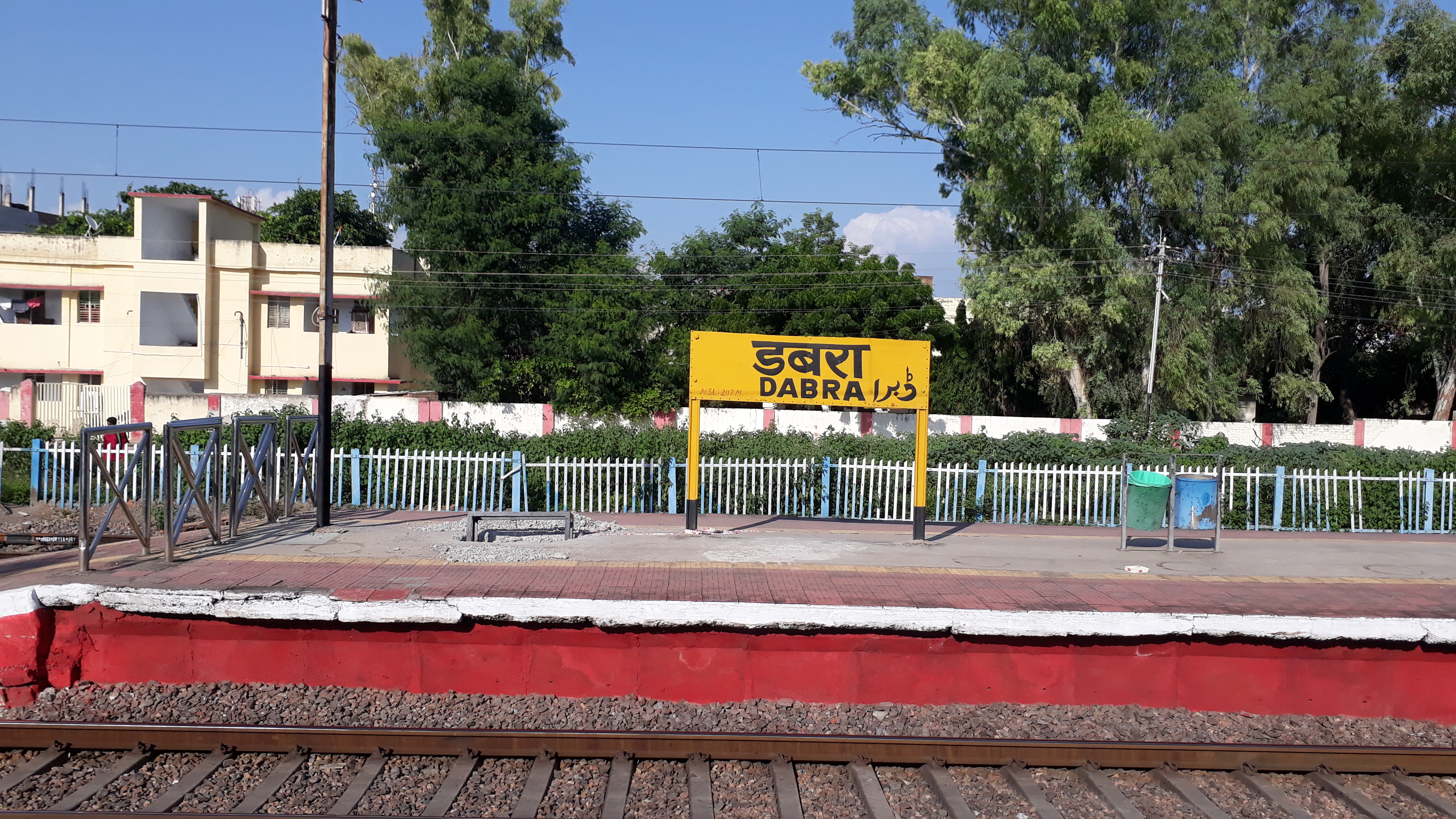
Dabra railway station

Dabra Railway Station is a railway station in Gwalior district, Madhya Pradesh. Its station code is DBA and it is operated by the Jhansi Railway Division. It serves around 2 lakh people of Dabra city, Bhitarwar, Tekanpur BSF Academy and other nearby villages.

It is connected to New Delhi, Mumbai, Bhopal, Agra, Mathura, Varanasi, Kanpur, Lucknow, Haridwar, Chhapra, Gaya, Pune, Nasik, Jammu, Amritsar, Nagpur, barouni, Nanded Sahib, Allahabad, Ferozpur, Chhindwara, Udaipur, Jaipur, Ajmer, Puri, Indore, Jabalpur, Sagar and Bhubaneshwar through rail network.

=== Roads ===
Dabra is connected to Gwalior and Jhansi via NH-44. This is a four-lane highway that connects major cities like Gwalior, Jhansi, Chhatarpur, Khajuraho, Panna, Satna, and, Rewa.

=== Airport ===
The nearest airport from Dabra is Gwalior Airport which is 54 km (34 mi) from Dabra. This airport serves to Bangalore, Indore, New Delhi, Mumbai, Jammu, Hyderabad, Jaipur, Pune, Patna, Chennai, Mangaluru, Ahemdabad, and Kochi.

== Geography ==
Dabra is located at 25.9°N 78.33°E. It has an average elevation of 201 metres (659 feet).

== Demographics ==
As of the 2011 Census of India, Dabra had a population of 237,974. Males constitute 54% of the population and females 46%. Dabra has an average literacy rate of 57%: male literacy is 67% and, female literacy is 46%. In Dabra, 15% of the population is under 6 years of age.

== Villages ==
Dabra tehsil/block has 155 villages in addition to the census towns of Dabra, Buzurg, Ramgarh, and Tekanpur. The villages are listed below:

| Village name | Total land area (hectares) | Population (in 2011) |
|---|---|---|
| Kalyani | 1,108.1 | 3,424 |
| Makoda | 239.1 | 1,527 |
| Beragarh | 209 | 2,845 |
| Chiruli | 1,317.2 | 2,254 |
| Chir Pura | 318.7 | 1,009 |
| Udalpada | 428.9 | 434 |
| Bansi | 287.6 | 377 |
| Masud Pur | 470.4 | 1,064 |
| Biramdhana | 390.9 | 843 |
| Kheriya | 290 | 443 |
| Salaiya | 444.7 | 897 |
| Gadhi | 1,341.6 | 2,472 |
| Berkheda | 270.6 | 203 |
| Sukha Patha | 1,358.7 | 2,426 |
| Ikona | 730.4 | 1,505 |
| Mahona | 160.2 | 122 |
| Hidayala | 202.3 | 4 |
| Lakhan Pura | 316.1 | 1,454 |
| Ladera | 435.8 | 1,137 |
| Rafatpur | 186.9 | 334 |
| Dhamnika | 624.2 | 939 |
| Gunjhar | 491.8 | 492 |
| Gijaurra | 2,677.2 | 2,041 |
| Bhageh | 1,534.6 | 2,749 |
| Lakhnoti | 333 | 1,208 |
| Ainti | 254.8 | 259 |
| Jangipur | 230.6 | 614 |
| Chak Jangipur | 291.5 | 120 |
| Ghongha | 297.5 | 668 |
| Shankarpur | 373.1 | 424 |
| Sakatpura | 188.4 | 829 |
| Gohinda | 529.2 | 659 |
| Chhatar Pur | 169.8 | 394 |
| Jargaon | 738.5 | 1,293 |
| Jatahra | 177.5 | 416 |
| Ekhara | 407 | 805 |
| Shuklhori | 672.8 | 2,761 |
| Semara | 451.8 | 740 |
| Mehagaon | 1,511.4 | 3,776 |
| Nagawan | 351.2 | 278 |
| Kitora | 998.5 | 2,285 |
| Bahadur Pur | 413.1 | 0 |
| Deogarh | 3,856 | 1,309 |
| Kiroi | 981.7 | 1,631 |
| Hathnoura | 2,423 | 1,887 |
| Sisgaon | 1,181.4 | 1,812 |
| Gudaichi | 0 | 0 |
| Semari | 798.4 | 1,315 |
| Kumharra | 733.6 | 1,391 |
| Nahatoli | 380.9 | 671 |
| Sili | 292.2 | 672 |
| Kheda | 22 | 4 |
| Jorasi | 1,346.7 | 2,362 |
| Putti | 1,482.2 | 1,857 |
| Kaithoda | 1,125.4 | 1,706 |
| Khedi | 113.9 | 65 |
| Chhapra | 345.9 | 1,197 |
| Gatari | 152 | 850 |
| Babu Pur | 536.5 | 1,055 |
| Lidhoura | 254.2 | 1,198 |
| Bhitora | 102.8 | 0 |
| Virrat | 773.5 | 1,116 |
| Sahona | 632.6 | 1,793 |
| Nibi | 386.8 | 1,281 |
| Pahadi | 140.8 | 270 |
| Patariya Pura | 207 | 638 |
| Bharroli | 111.2 | 584 |
| Karahi | 491.8 | 1,291 |
| Dhahi | 535.3 | 1,892 |
| Akbai Badi | 1,649.4 | 4,015 |
| Ajaigarh | 614.1 | 1,251 |
| Gajapur | 763 | 1,217 |
| Maharaj Pur | 271 | 0 |
| Janakpur | 322.6 | 1,027 |
| Dhawa | 179.9 | 886 |
| Samudan | 428.2 | 1,367 |
| Sekrajagir | 839 | 1,599 |
| Beru | 444.9 | 828 |
| Kardhu | 167.5 | 413 |
| Bona | 255.6 | 1,062 |
| Lakhiya | 229.2 | 605 |
| Ghamad Pura | 191.4 | 118 |
| Patha Panihar | 633.9 | 2,164 |
| Anant Peth | 192.3 | 348 |
| Gaindol Kalan | 240.7 | 911 |
| Tighru | 116.7 | 984 |
| Sehrai | 302.9 | 816 |
| Sarnagat | 627.9 | 1,623 |
| Badera Buzurg | 264.5 | 716 |
| Badera Khurd | 279 | 568 |
| Khedi Santal | 117.6 | 71 |
| Baragawan | 588.2 | 888 |
| Nibhera | 425.9 | 583 |
| Arusi | 339.8 | 826 |
| Belgadha | 500.9 | 739 |
| Chand Pur | 1,140 | 3,523 |
| Karra | 529.3 | 1,206 |
| Geydol Khurd | 211 | 457 |
| Chetu Pada | 322.9 | 705 |
| Raipur | 295.2 | 348 |
| Simiriya Tal | 1,468.9 | 3,950 |
| Barol | 403.5 | 1,831 |
| Patharra | 257.8 | 712 |
| Itayal | 792.6 | 2,277 |
| Salwai | 1,361.9 | 3,596 |
| Chitoli | 262.9 | 365 |
| Lohgarh | 1,176.1 | 2,139 |
| Berkheda | 206 | 424 |
| Arru | 471.3 | 1,934 |
| Khedi Natawa | 187.4 | 569 |
| Sultanpur | 190.9 | 932 |
| Maharaj Pur | 500.8 | 1,958 |
| Chitawani | 911.8 | 1,464 |
| Khadwai | 651.8 | 2,032 |
| Chomo | 463.4 | 1,002 |
| Rampura | 158.2 | 387 |
| Khedi Parasar | 378.3 | 840 |
| Khajurahai | 360.8 | 789 |
| Rajiyawar | 426 | 1,038 |
| Litapura | 308 | 752 |
| Gobra | 234.4 | 923 |
| Gulihai | 444.6 | 993 |
| Sehtol | 376 | 862 |
| Chhimak | 755.2 | 4,085 |
| Thethiyapura | 227.6 | 430 |
| Sunwai | 225.9 | 758 |
| Akbai (Antri) | 477.2 | 935 |
| Khedi Raimal | 382.6 | 1,220 |
| Sekra | 360.4 | 1,059 |
| Sirsa | 341.6 | 1,253 |
| Sirol | 214.7 | 818 |
| Deora | 224.1 | 915 |
| Jawal | 230.7 | 172 |
| Kosha | 308.8 | 754 |
| Shinghpur | 106.4 | 624 |
| Kariyawati | 1,252.3 | 2,996 |
| Sarwa | 369.9 | 1,076 |
| Samchauli | 157.7 | 490 |
| Jhadoli | 386.2 | 2,212 |
| Jatrathi | 366.9 | 1,279 |
| Rarua | 516.3 | 360 |
| Milghan | 495.6 | 1,035 |
| Lidhora | 467.3 | 1,327 |
| Dhirora | 313.4 | 740 |
| Simiriya Bhehsnari | 310.7 | 761 |
| Nunhari | 302 | 1,006 |
| Masud Pur | 225 | 659 |
| Kisoli | 192.5 | 532 |
| Jarawani | 299.1 | 703 |
| Baraua | 216.1 | 502 |
| Bhensnari | 1,321.9 | 2,692 |
| Bijak Pur | 1,127.5 | 2,151 |
| Magrora | 1,356.4 | 2,254 |
| Barotha | 534.7 | 3,112 |
| Sirohi | 287.4 | 1,855 |
