= Bhitarwar =

Municipality in Madhya Pradesh, India

- Municipality
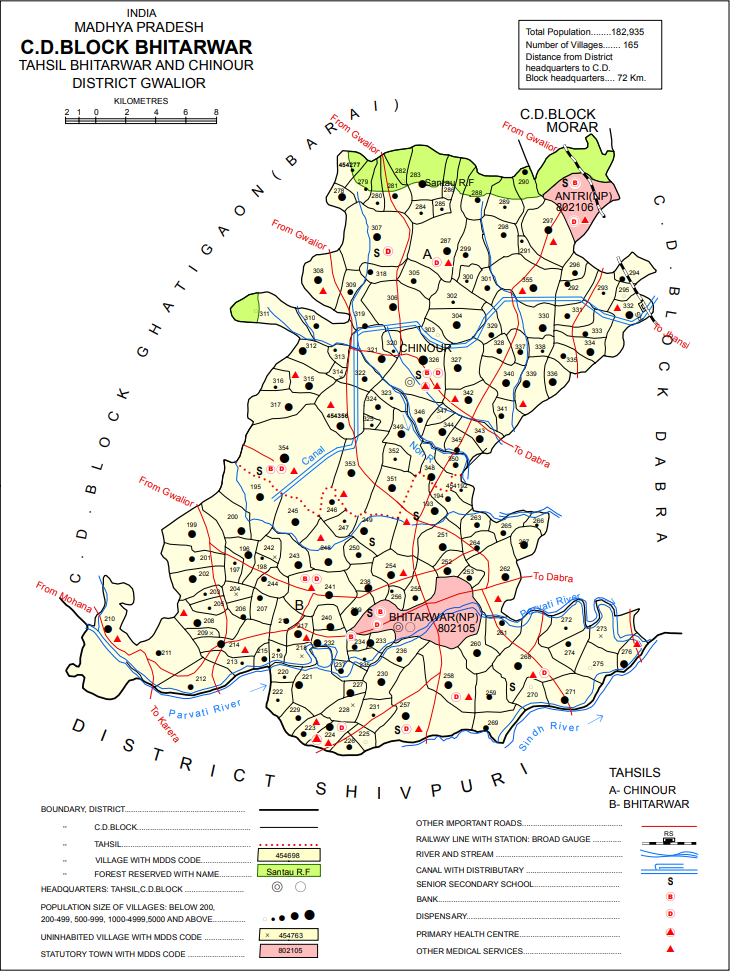
- Map of Bhitarwar CD block and tehsil

- Location in Madhya Pradesh, India Bhitarwar (India)
- Coordinates: 25.8°N 78.12°E
- Country: India India
- State: Madhya Pradesh
- District: Gwalior

Government
  - Type: Nagar panchayat

Area
  - Total: 23.94 km^{2} (9.24 sq mi)
- Elevation: 199 m (653 ft)

Population (2011)
  - Total: 19,096
  - Density: 797.7/km^{2} (2,066/sq mi)

Languages
  - Official: Hindi
- Time zone: UTC+5:30 (IST)
- PIN: 475220
- Vehicle registration: MP07
- Website: https://bhitarwar.online/

Bhitarwar is a city and a municipality in Gwalior district in the state of Madhya Pradesh, India. The town is surrounded by a river called Parbati.

As of 2011, the population of Bhitarwar town is 19,096, in 3,422 households.

Bhitarwar is the headquarters of a tehsil, Vidhan Sabha constituency, as well as a community development block. The block is divided between the tehsils of Bhitarwar and Chinour; Chinour tehsil was created out of Bhitarwar tehsil in 2008.

== Geography ==
Bhitarwar is located at 25.8°N 78.12°E. It has an average elevation of 227 metres (745 feet).

== History ==
Earliest maintain of this city found place in the writings of Bhavbhuti as Pawaya which was situated on the River Para (modern Parbati) and Chandrabhaga (modern Sindh). Pawaya was ancient capital of Naga dynasty and it had relationships with Gupta Empire too. Current pawaya village is situated in east direction (7 km radius) from modern town. It was captured by Maratha kings of Gwalior (Scindias) in a small clash. Afghans has important role in this war The Bhitarwar Fort was established by Hanselia Jat ruler Raja Berajshah in 16th century.He also built a Fort at the nearby hill known as Laxmangarh for his brother Laxman Singh.

There are many other building of Hanselia Jat rulers in Bhitarwar.There are many other fort build by Hanselia rulers like Mastura Fort, Kiror Fort and Gijora Fort.

By the early 20th century, Bhitarwar was the seat of the pargana of Mastura. It was hit hard by the Indian famine of 1899-1900, and many people died. Early-20th-century Bhitarwar had a post office run by Gwalior State, a police station, and a small, poorly maintained fort. The 1901 census recorded its population as 1,530 people (815 male and 715 female).

== Demographics ==
As of 2017 India census, Bhitarwar had a population of 25,670. Males constitute 54% of the population and females 46%. Bhitarwar has an average literacy rate of 74%, higher than the national average of 59.5%; with male literacy of 82% and female literacy of 64%. 17% of the population is under 6 years of age.

Religion in City of Bhitarwar(2011)
1. Hinduism (91.3%)
2. Islam (5.70%)
3. Jainism (1.79%)
4. Christianity (0.10%)
5. Other or Not stated (0.00%)
6. Sikhism (1.07%)
7. Buddhism (0.01%)

== Transportation ==
Bhitarwar is situated on Dabra - satanwada state highway and connected to all nearby cities by road. Nearest railway station is in Dabra, and major railway junction is Gwalior which is around 72 km away from the town and jhansi 75 km . Nearest airport is Rajmata vijyaraje Scindia airport Gwalior. There is no hope for railway line to this town

== Economy ==
Economy of the city is based on agriculture. The main crop of this area is wheat, rice and sugarcane, there is a sugar factory in this city. Other than this cottage industries also found place in the town.

Bricks are the most important manufactured goods produced in Bhitarwar. Red marble and mika also found in this area

== Tourist attractions ==
There is many places of interest in the town like Dhumeswar, Lakheswari and Diyadah. Around 15 km away is an ancient city called Padma Pavaya. Goleswar temple is another place for visit in the city. There is a small fort in the old bhitarwar city which has need to be restoration. Some parks are also build by the govt in the town are lakhmibai park, laxamangarh park Harsi dam etc.

== List of villages ==
Bhitarwar block contains 165 rural villages, split between the tehsils of Bhitarwar and Chinour. As of 2011, the total population of these villages is 182,935, in 35,545 households. The villages are as follows:

Village name	Total land area (hectares)	Population (in 2011)	Tehsil
Karora	167.7	246	Bhitarwar
Gadajar	980.4	2,287	Bhitarwar
Ikahara	416.3	982	Bhitarwar
Rithondan	1,260.2	2,527	Bhitarwar
Richhari Khurd	405.5	1,181	Bhitarwar
Jatrathi	246.2	447	Bhitarwar
Into	185	249	Bhitarwar
Bajna	903.8	1,690	Bhitarwar
Syau	799.1	1,395	Bhitarwar
Ganja	533.9	626	Bhitarwar
Dongarpur	551.2	1,010	Bhitarwar
Mundhari	151.1	270	Bhitarwar
Talapur	30.1	0	Bhitarwar
Ruar	223	469	Bhitarwar
Khor	360.5	688	Bhitarwar
Musahari	256	668	Bhitarwar
Chitoli	321.3	1,835	Bhitarwar
Bhitari	126.8	0	Bhitarwar
Harsi	2,116.7	2,253	Bhitarwar
Belgadha	266.3	977	Bhitarwar
Jakhwar	183.3	860	Bhitarwar
Kaithod	289.6	331	Bhitarwar
Deori Kalan	677.9	1,928	Bhitarwar
Dhobat	148.2	803	Bhitarwar
Mahutha	310.5	899	Bhitarwar
Gadhota	410.8	1,752	Bhitarwar
Kupeda	289.3	0	Bhitarwar
Lodhi	286	459	Bhitarwar
Masudpur	135.3	277	Bhitarwar
Palayachha	385.7	1,554	Bhitarwar
Bamor	348.2	350	Bhitarwar
Ramjipur	196.5	837	Bhitarwar
Mohangarh	810	2,649	Bhitarwar
Chirroli	144.7	199	Bhitarwar
Khadaua	325.5	800	Bhitarwar
Kheda Bhitarwar	801.9	1,301	Bhitarwar
Isepur	35.7	0	Bhitarwar
Kudpar	221.7	540	Bhitarwar
Deogarh	568.6	1,503	Bhitarwar
Raipur Sani	269.2	463	Bhitarwar
Silha	106.4	1,131	Bhitarwar
Saharan	413.2	1,086	Bhitarwar
Adampur	163.5	737	Bhitarwar
Ghatkhiriya	182.1	295	Bhitarwar
Dadumar	254.2	508	Bhitarwar
Najarpur	163.7	775	Bhitarwar
Shyampur	474.5	1,319	Bhitarwar
Jaura	299.5	1,478	Bhitarwar
Baniya Tor	382.2	1,266	Bhitarwar
Mastura	1,200.9	3,378	Bhitarwar
Hurhuri	121	0	Bhitarwar
Richhari Kalan	569.4	1,666	Bhitarwar
Sehbai	337.6	570	Bhitarwar
Kheda Tanka	652.3	1,367	Bhitarwar
Bela	1,014.4	897	Bhitarwar
Masudpur	186.6	380	Bhitarwar
Rahi	688.5	1,518	Bhitarwar
Sinharan	692.1	1,498	Bhitarwar
Maragpur	213.9	731	Bhitarwar
Charkha	554.4	1,725	Bhitarwar
Baraya	280.4	1,052	Bhitarwar
Sukhna Khirya	190.4	678	Bhitarwar
Kithoda	521.7	1,818	Bhitarwar
Nayagaon	377.2	624	Bhitarwar
Dhakad Khiriya	139.2	490	Bhitarwar
Kerua	2,229.2	3,737	Bhitarwar
Gohinda	1,181.4	2,662	Bhitarwar
Bamroul (Bamrol-81)	489.8	849	Bhitarwar
Basondi	483.6	1,163	Bhitarwar
Machhariya	448.1	706	Bhitarwar
Bagwai	1,371.8	3,478	Bhitarwar
Sonta Khiriya	260.2	750	Bhitarwar
Chhirata	217.5	763	Bhitarwar
Bhangarh	367.5	766	Bhitarwar
Nivi	116.4	417	Bhitarwar
Benheri	383.6	1,283	Bhitarwar
San Khini	1,355.4	4,127	Bhitarwar
Basai	673.8	872	Bhitarwar
Gondhari	331.5	75	Bhitarwar
Ludhari	705	1,184	Bhitarwar
Khadicha	682.8	470	Bhitarwar
Manpur	442	0	Bhitarwar
Jhau	436.4	580	Bhitarwar
Dhumeshwar	73.6	2	Bhitarwar
Pawaya	947.6	1,454	Bhitarwar
Rawat Banwari	319.9	375	Chinour
Himmatgarh	234.9	1,336	Chinour
Gujar Banwari	457.9	295	Chinour
Richhera	307.2	278	Chinour
Mauchh	396.6	951	Chinour
Amardha	313.2	160	Chinour
Dhiroti	927.6	1,295	Chinour
Nikodi	270.8	489	Chinour
Manikpur	170.8	256	Chinour
Saraipura	184.4	83	Chinour
Amroul (Amrol-81)	1,315.6	3,004	Chinour
Toda	528	759	Chinour
Bharas	494.5	368	Chinour
Nihona	368.9	640	Chinour
Jujhar Pur	207.2	322	Chinour
Kiratpura	378	651	Chinour
Ladhwaya	415	645	Chinour
Bajhera	643	573	Chinour
Manpur	130	182	Chinour
Pipripura	213	619	Chinour
Eraya	1,103.4	1,650	Chinour
Badera Bharas	468.8	650	Chinour
Rajaua	519	509	Chinour
Prempur	173	369	Chinour
Sikrouda (Sikroda)	387	719	Chinour
Chak Shankarpur	223	457	Chinour
Badera Jhil	127.2	28	Chinour
Bhori	971.1	1,942	Chinour
Jhankari	502	385	Chinour
Pipraua	1,131.7	1,411	Chinour
Banwar	1,766.3	4,209	Chinour
Urwa	795.4	1,617	Chinour
Berni	348.3	699	Chinour
Surajpur	473.2	819	Chinour
Bhimbada	854	106	Chinour
Deori Tanka	81.9	1,731	Chinour
Chhida	172.3	363	Chinour
Shyampur Tanka	17	0	Chinour
Dubaha Tanka	945.8	2,708	Chinour
Nayagaon Tanka	236.4	353	Chinour
Dubahi	873.8	1,300	Chinour
Pura Banwar	271.4	865	Chinour
Kakardha	453	740	Chinour
Tekpur	173.2	368	Chinour
Kishorgarh	424.1	1,261	Chinour
Garhi Salampur	514.6	937	Chinour
Bhadeshwar	251.1	439	Chinour
Sirsula	251.1	579	Chinour
Nonewar	73.2	240	Chinour
Chinour	1,595.8	7,797	Chinour
Rarua	651.9	1,729	Chinour
Kishanpur	309.5	686	Chinour
Khurdpar	231.9	627	Chinour
Badki Saray	843.3	2,822	Chinour
Puri	380.6	782	Chinour
Bharthari	630.8	1,728	Chinour
Fatehpur	389.4	961	Chinour
Khairwaya	424.3	1,142	Chinour
Piprau	372.2	822	Chinour
Samaya	470	1,079	Chinour
Khedi Dabariya	259.7	834	Chinour
Mohammedpur	158	211	Chinour
Bhengana	806.6	1,588	Chinour
Kaithi	501.6	1,182	Chinour
Paira	358	807	Chinour
Gharsondi	666.4	2,301	Chinour
Shekhupur	496.8	1,061	Chinour
Maina	398.9	1,843	Chinour
Nonki Saray	295.7	891	Chinour
Rijhora	296.2	691	Chinour
Gijorra	159.4	187	Chinour
Doni	322.4	1,346	Chinour
Daulatpur	636.5	1,352	Chinour
Berkheda	284.9	614	Chinour
Pachora	776	1,632	Chinour
Birgawan	265.6	260	Chinour
Itma	1,418.5	3,390	Chinour
Karhiya	3,479.2	7,198	Chinour
Kachhaua	1,428	2,201	Chinour
Mehgaon	1086.8	2,806	Chinour
