= Tekanpur =

Tekanpur may refer to:

- Tekanpur, India
- Tekanpur, Nepal
