= Magrora =

- village
- Location in Madhya Pradesh, India
- Coordinates: 25°50′20″N 78°20′34″E
- Country: India
- State: Madhya Pradesh

Languages
  - Official: Hindi
- Time zone: UTC+5:30 (IST)

Magrora is a town in Gwalior district in Madhya Pradesh. It is situated at a distance of about 5 km from Dabra town, on Gwalior-Jhansi Road, in Gwalior district.

== History ==
Magrora fort was built by Maharaja Hamirjoodeo. Magrora state has been known for kind hearted rulers very popular amongst the public. Before the war with Mahadji Sindhia they were the rulers of Pichhore (Dabra).

== Transport ==
The nearest airport is Gwalior.
