= District council =

District council may refer to:

- A branch of local government in the United Kingdom:
  - Supervising one of the districts of England:
    - A metropolitan borough
    - A non-metropolitan district
    - A unitary authority
  - Supervising one of the principal areas of Wales
  - Supervising one of the subdivisions of Scotland
  - Supervising one of the districts of Northern Ireland
- A branch of local government in the Australian state of South Australia
- One of the district councils of Bangladesh
- One of the district councils of Hong Kong
  - District Council (First), a former functional constituency in the elections for the Legislative Council of Hong Kong
  - District Council (Second), a former functional constituency in the elections for the Legislative Council of Hong Kong
- One of the district councils of India
- One of the districts of New Zealand
- One of the district people's congresses of the municipalities or prefectural-level cities of the People's Republic of China
- Council of the District of Columbia, local government of District of Columbia
- District council (Germany)
- A labour council at a district level

== See also ==
- Zila Parishad (disambiguation)
