= Antari =

- Town
- Location in Madhya Pradesh, India Antari (India)
- Coordinates: 26°3′48″N 78°12′51″E
- Country: India
- State: Madhya Pradesh
- District: Gwalior

Population (2001)
  - Total: 9,534

Languages
  - Official: Hindi
- Time zone: UTC+5:30 (IST)
- ISO 3166 code: IN-MP
- Vehicle registration: MP

Antari is a town and a nagar panchayat in Gwalior district in the state of Madhya Pradesh, India.

== Demographics ==
As of 2001 India census, Antari had a population of 9534. Males constitute 53% of the population and females 47%. Antari has an average literacy rate of 53%, lower than the national average of 59.5%; with 66% of the males and 34% of females literate. 16% of the population is under 6 years of age.
