= Chinour =

- Town
- Location in Madhya Pradesh, India
- Coordinates: 25.94°N 78.10°E
- Country: India
- State: Madhya Pradesh
- District: Gwalior District

Languages
  - Official: Hindi
- PIN: 475110
- Vehicle registration: MP 07

Chinour is a Tehsil Headquarter and a Gram Panchayat Town in Gwalior District of Madhya Pradesh.

== Geography ==
Chinour is located on 25.94°N 78.10°E. It has an average elevation of 508 metres (1669 feet).

== Demographics ==
As per Census of India 2011 The Chinour Town has population of 7,797 of which 4,109 are males while 3,688 are females, Average Sex Ratio of Chinour town is 898.

Total 1383 families residing in the Chinour town as per report of Census 2011.

== Transportation ==
Chinour town is well connected with roads. Major road passing through the town It Connected it from Gwalior, Karera and Dabra. Pin Code of Chinour town is 475110.
