= John Sparks (Royal Navy officer) =

English cricketer and Royal Navy officer

Captain John Sparks CBE
- Born: John Barnes Sparks; 31 May 1873; Morar, Gwalior State, British India
- Died: 29 March 1920 (aged 46); Marylebone, London, England
- Cricket career

Cricket information
- Batting: Right-handed

Career statistics
Competition	First-class
Matches	1
Runs scored	17
Batting average	8.50
100s/50s	–/–
Top score	13
Catches/stumpings	–/–
- Source: Cricinfo, 6 December 2019

Captain John Barnes Sparks CBE (31 May 1873 – 29 March 1920) was a Royal Navy officer and English first-class cricketer.

== Life ==
The son of Lieutenant-Colonel John Barnes Sparks of the Bengal Staff Corps, he was born in May 1873 at Morar in British India. Sparks was educated in England at the Britannia Royal Naval College, before entering into the Royal Navy as a sub-lieutenant. He was promoted to the rank of lieutenant in September 1894.

Sparks served in the Mahdist War, commanding the steam gunboat Sheikh. He was mentioned in dispatches for his role in the Nile Expedition of 1898. In June 1900 he was appointed in command of the tender HMS Columbine, serving on the North America and West Indies Station. The ship visited Bermuda, Saint Lucia and Trinidad in late 1902. He was promoted to the rank of commander in December 1905.

Sparks served in the First World War, during which he was promoted to the rank of captain in December 1914. He was made a CBE in the 1919 New Year Honours for services rendered during the war and was mentioned in dispatches in April 1919. He was invalidated from active service due to esophageal cancer, succumbing to the disease in March 1920. He is buried in Brompton Cemetery, London.

== Cricket ==
Sparks made a single appearance in first-class cricket, captaining the Royal Navy against the British Army cricket team at Lord's in 1913. Batting twice in the match, he was dismissed for 13 runs in the navy first-innings by Francis Wyatt, while in their second-innings he was dismissed for 4 runs by Harold Fawcus. He also acted as wicket-keeper.

== Family ==
Sparks married in 1902 Dorothy Talbot Nicholson, daughter of John Nicholson of Saint John, New Brunswick; she died in 1909. At the time of the marriage he was serving on HMS Columbine.
