= Bilaua =

- Town
- Location in Madhya Pradesh, India Bilaua (India)
- Coordinates: 26.03°N 78.26°E
- Country: India
- State: Madhya Pradesh
- District: Gwalior

Government
  - Type: Municipal corporation
  - Block President: Anvesh sharma
- Elevation: 236 m (774 ft)

Population (2016)
  - Total: 30,000

Languages
  - Official: Hindi
- Time zone: UTC+5:30 (IST)
- PIN: 475001
- Telephone code: 09575
- ISO 3166 code: IN-MP
- Vehicle registration: MP
- Sex ratio: 924 ♂/♀

Bilaua is a town and a nagar panchayat in Gwalior district in the state of Madhya Pradesh, India.

== Geography ==
Bilaua is located at 26.03°N 78.26°E. It has an average elevation of 236 metres (774 feet).

== Demographics ==
As of 2001 India census, Bilaua had a population of 20,000. Males constitute 88% of the population and females 74%. Bilaua has an average literacy rate of 85%, higher than the national average of 59.5%; with male literacy of 66% and female literacy of 42%. 16% of the population is under 6 years of age.
