= Bandholi =

- village
- Location in Madhya Pradesh, India
- Coordinates: 26°11′6″N 78°17′6″E
- Country: India
- State: Madhya Pradesh

Languages
  - Official: Hindi
- Time zone: UTC+5:30 (IST)

Bandholi is a village in Gwalior district situated at a distance of 6 km from Murar on Gwalior-Behat road.
