= Bilheti =

- village
- Location in Madhya Pradesh, India
- Coordinates: 26°16′56″N 78°24′4″E
- Country: India
- State: Madhya Pradesh

Languages
  - Official: Hindi
- Time zone: UTC+5:30 (IST)

Bilheti is a village in Gwalior district in Madhya Pradesh. Bilheti is located at a distance of 20 km from Gwalior city in east direction on Gwalior-Chitaura Road.
