= Zila Parishad =

Zila Parishad means District Council and may refer to:

- District councils of Bangladesh
- District council (India)

== See also ==
- District council (disambiguation)
- Panchayati raj, administrative system in India
