= Tekanpur, India =

Tekanpur
- Census town
- Tekanpur
- Location in Madhya Pradesh, India Tekanpur (India)
- Coordinates: 25.98°N 78.27°E
- Country: India
- State: Madhya Pradesh
- District: Gwalior
- Founder: Morbar's

Government
  - Type: Gram Panchayat
  - Body: Sarpanch
- Elevation: 190 m (620 ft)

Population (Census 2011)
  - Total: 12,348

Languages
  - Official: Hindi
- Time zone: UTC+5:30 (IST)
- Postal code: 475005
- ISO 3166 code: IN-MP
- Vehicle registration: MP07

Tekanpur is a census town in Gwalior district in the Indian state of Madhya Pradesh. The town is also home to the Border Security Force Academy where the Assistant Commandants (Officer Trainees) are trained and it also houses Basic Training Centre where the Sub-Inspectors and Enrolled recruits of the Border Security Force are trained.

== Geography ==
Tekanpur is located at 25.98°N 78.27°E. It has an average elevation of 190 metres (623 feet).

== Demographics ==
As of 2001 India census, Tekanpur had a population of 12,819. Males constitute 67% of the population and females 33%. Tekanpur has an average literacy rate of 78%, higher than the national average of 59.5%: male literacy is 87%, and female literacy is 60%. In Tekanpur, 13% of the population is under 6 years of age.

== Transport ==
The nearest airport is Gwalior.
