= Nibi =

- Village
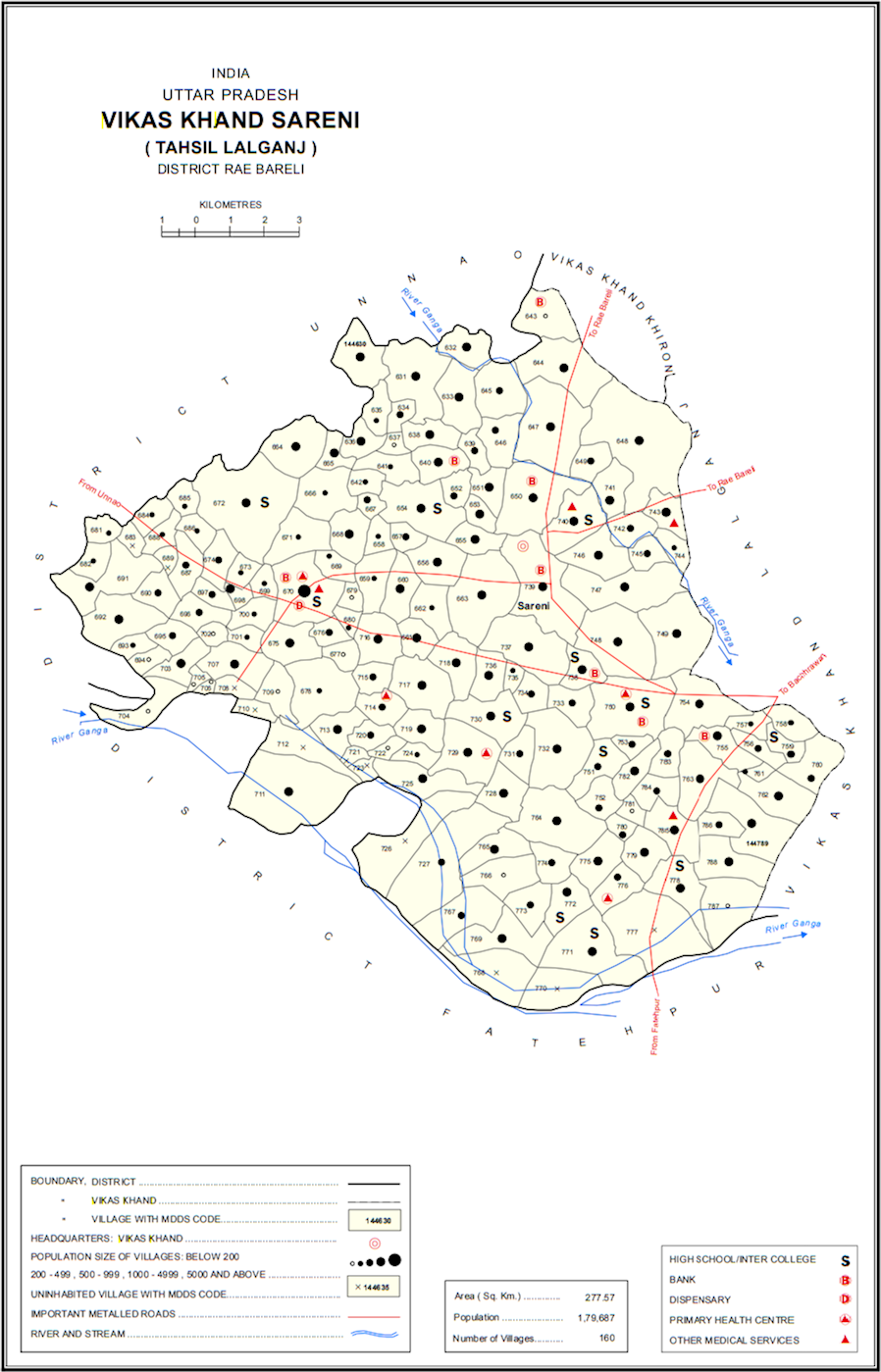
- Map showing Nibi (#717) in Sareni CD block

- Location in Uttar Pradesh, India Nibi (India)
- Coordinates: 26.11766°N 80.7855°E
- Country: India
- State: Uttar Pradesh
- District: Raebareli
- Tehsil: Lalganj

Area
  - Total: 2.569 km^{2} (0.992 sq mi)

Population
  - Total: 1,708
  - Density: 664.9/km^{2} (1,722/sq mi)

Languages
  - Official: Hindi
- Time zone: UTC+5:30 (IST)
- PIN: 229212
- Telephone code: 915315
- Vehicle registration: UP33
- Nearest city: Raebareli
- Sex ratio: 950 ♂/♀
- Literacy: 65%
- Lok Sabha constituency: Raebareli
- Vidhan Sabha constituency: Sareni

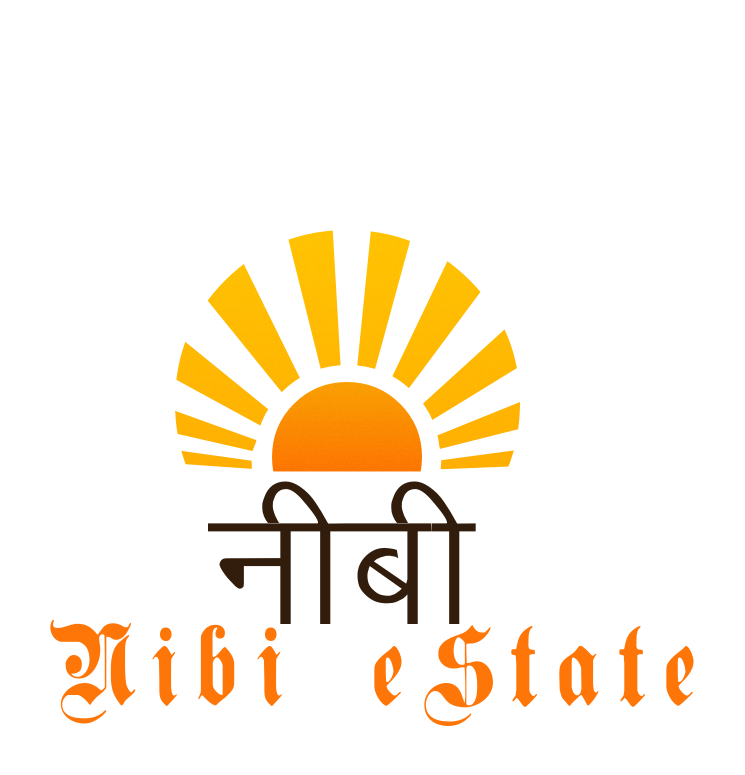

Nibi is a village in Sareni block of Raebareli district, in Uttar Pradesh state in northern India. It is known for Agnihotri Zamindars. The village hosts a market on Wednesdays and Saturdays, and the main staple foods are wheat and rice. As of 2011, the population of Nibi is 1,708, in 306 households, and it has one primary school and no healthcare facilities. It serves as the headquarters of a nyaya panchayat that also includes 17 other villages. Agriculture is an important part of the local economy.

Nibi is located 55 km from Raebareli town and 90 km from Kanpur. However very few trains halt at Lalganj, making Raebareli a more convenient rail head. The nearest airport is Lucknow Airport. On the west, Nibi is bordered by the villages of Kashikheda and Vishayakpur.

The 1951 census recorded Nibi (as "Niwi") as comprising 2 hamlets, with a total population of 780 people (398 male and 382 female), in 148 households and 123 physical houses. The area of the village was given as 641 acres. 145 residents were literate, 118 male and 27 female. The village was listed as belonging to the pargana of Sareni and the thana of Sareni.

The 1961 census recorded Nibi as comprising 2 hamlets, with a total population of 847 people (416 male and 431 female), in 165 households and 143 physical houses. The area of the village was given as 641 acres. The village had a post office and a medical practitioner then, and there was one grain mill.

The 1981 census recorded Nibi as having a population of 1,040 people, in 213 households, and having an area of 261.58 hectares.

The 1991 census recorded Nibi as having a total population of 1,194 people (632 male and 562 female), in 218 households and 218 physical houses. The area of the village was listed as 259 hectares. Members of the 0-6 age group numbered 213, or 18% of the total; this group was 47% male (101) and 53% female (112). Members of scheduled castes made up 28% of the village's population, while no members of scheduled tribes were recorded. The literacy rate of the village was 46% (375 men and 169 women). 370 people were classified as main workers (288 men and 82 women), while 0 people were classified as marginal workers; the remaining 824 residents were non-workers. The breakdown of main workers by employment category was as follows: 172 cultivators (i.e. people who owned or leased their own land); 161 agricultural labourers (i.e. people who worked someone else's land in return for payment); 8 workers in livestock, forestry, fishing, hunting, plantations, orchards, etc.; 0 in mining and quarrying; 3 household industry workers; 0 workers employed in other manufacturing, processing, service, and repair roles; 3 construction workers; 2 employed in trade and commerce; 1 employed in transport, storage, and communications; and 20 in other services.

== Notable people ==
- Shri Shitla Sharan Agnihotri (Retired Principal of Junior High School, Ranikheda & recipient of National Awards for Teachers, 1984)
- Dr. Shrikant Agnihotri (Former Deputy CMO, Raebareli & Retired Joint Director, Department of Food and Health, Government of Uttar Pradesh)
