= Pichhore, Gwalior =

Pichhore
- Town
- Location in Madhya Pradesh, India Pichhore (India)
- Coordinates: 25°57′26″N 78°23′41″E
- Country: India
- State: Madhya Pradesh
- District: Gwalior

Population (2001)
  - Total: 11,725

Languages
  - Official: Hindi
- Time zone: UTC+5:30 (IST)
- ISO 3166 code: IN-MP
- Vehicle registration: MP

Pichhore is a town and a nagar panchayat in Gwalior district in the Indian state of Madhya Pradesh.

== Demographics ==
As of 2001 India census, Pichhore had a population of 11,725. Males constitute 53% of the population and females 47%. Pichhore has an average literacy rate of 52%, lower than the national average of 59.5%: male literacy is 63%, and female literacy is 40%. In Pichhore, 17% of the population is under 6 years of age.

== History ==
Pichhore was founded by Raja Bhagirath Deo, a Jat of Deoderia clan. The most famous Deoderia king was Raja Hamir Deo who was a contemporary of Shah Jahan.

During his reign, he conquered 52 fortresses and had a revenue of seven lakhs. The next renowned king of this principality was Raja Pahar Singh, who was an ally of Maharaja Jawahar Singh of Bharatpur. Raja Pahar Singh helped him in his expeditions in Pushkar and gave support in expanding territories in Northern Madhya Pradesh in 1767-1768 A.D.
