= Zila (country subdivision) =

Country subdivision

A zilā, zilla, zillah, jela, or jilha is a country subdivision mostly used officially in South Asian countries such as Bangladesh, India, Nepal and Pakistan. It is translated as district.

== Zilas in Bangladesh ==
The divisions of Bangladesh are further divided into districts or zilas (Bengali: জেলা). The headquarters of a district is called the district seat (Bengali: জেলা সদর, romanized: zila sadar). There are 64 districts in Bangladesh. The districts are further subdivided into 495 subdistricts or upazilas.

== Zilas in India ==
A district (zila), also known as revenue district, is an administrative division of an Indian state or territory. In some cases, districts are further subdivided into sub-divisions, and in others directly into tehsils or talukas. As of 9 December 2025, there are a total of 800 districts in India. This count includes Mahe and Yanam which are Census districts and not Administrative districts and also includes the temporary Maha Kumbh Mela district but excludes Itanagar Capital Complex which has a Deputy Commissioner but is not an official district.

== Zilas of Nepal ==
Districts in Nepal are second level of administrative divisions after provinces. Districts are subdivided into municipalities and rural municipalities. There are seven provinces and 77 districts in Nepal.

There were total of 75 districts in Nepal until 2015, grouped into 14 Zones and 5 Development Regions. After the adoption of federalism in 2015, the existing Zones and Development Regions were dissolved. Nawalparasi District and Rukum District were respectively divided into Parasi District and Nawalpur District, and Eastern Rukum District and Western Rukum District, making total number of districts 77. (Note: The districts of Nawalparasi and Rukum were formally divided following the promulgation of the Constitution of Nepal in 2015, which introduced a federal structure. However, the division was implemented administratively only in 2017, following the local level elections and the restructuring of local governance, when the former District Development Committees were replaced by District Coordination Committees, and the new district boundaries came into practical effect.) These 77 districts were regrouped into 7 provinces.

== Zilas in Pakistan ==
The districts of Pakistan (Urdu: اِضلاعِ پاكِستان) are the third-level administrative divisions of Pakistan, below provinces and divisions, but forming the first-tier of local government. In total, there are 145 districts in Pakistan. excluding Islamabad Capital Territory. These districts are further divided into tehsils and union councils.

== See also ==
- Zila Parishad (disambiguation)
- Districts of British India
