= Gwalior district =

Coordinates: 26°13′25″N 78°10′45″E

- District
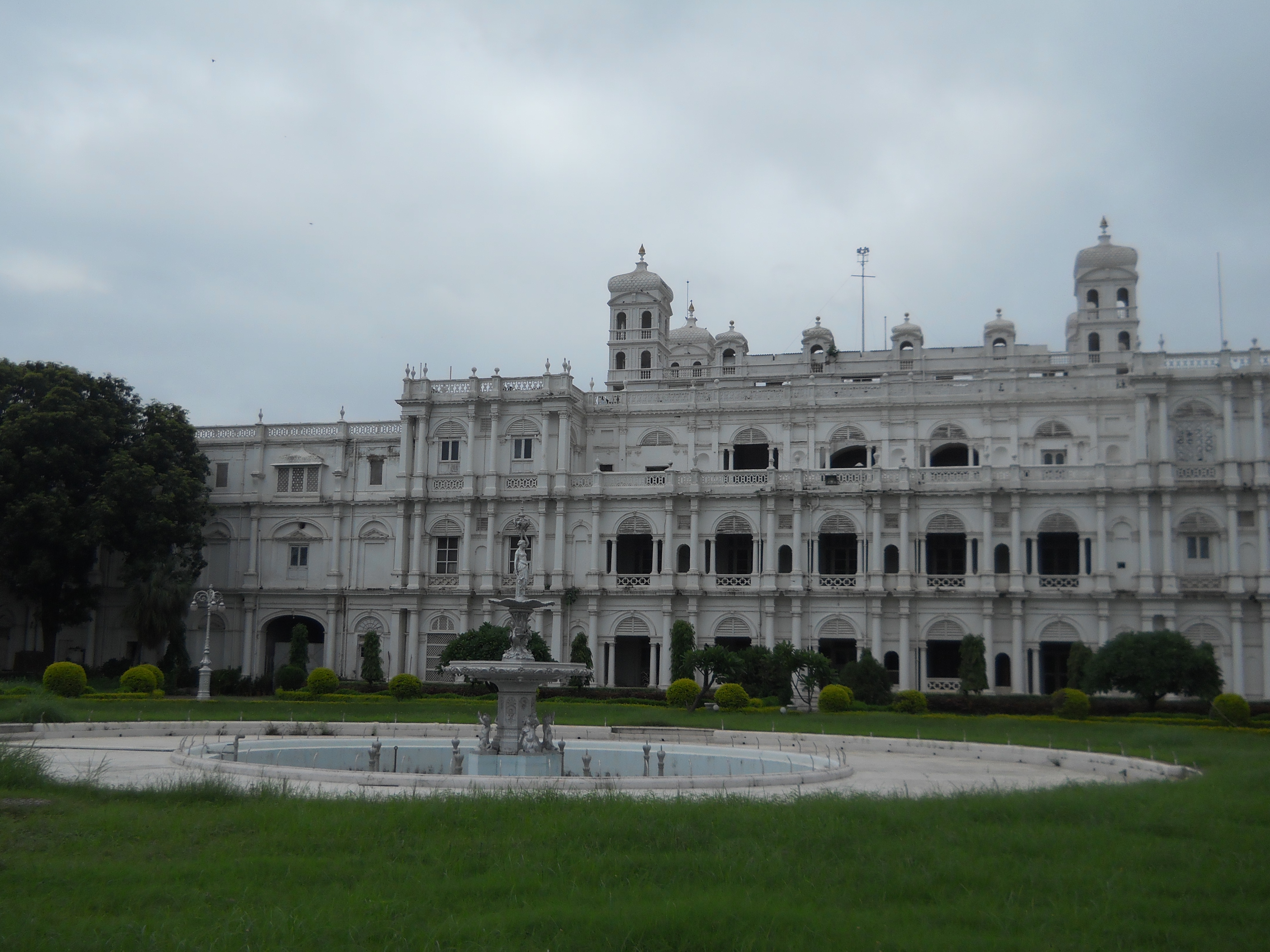
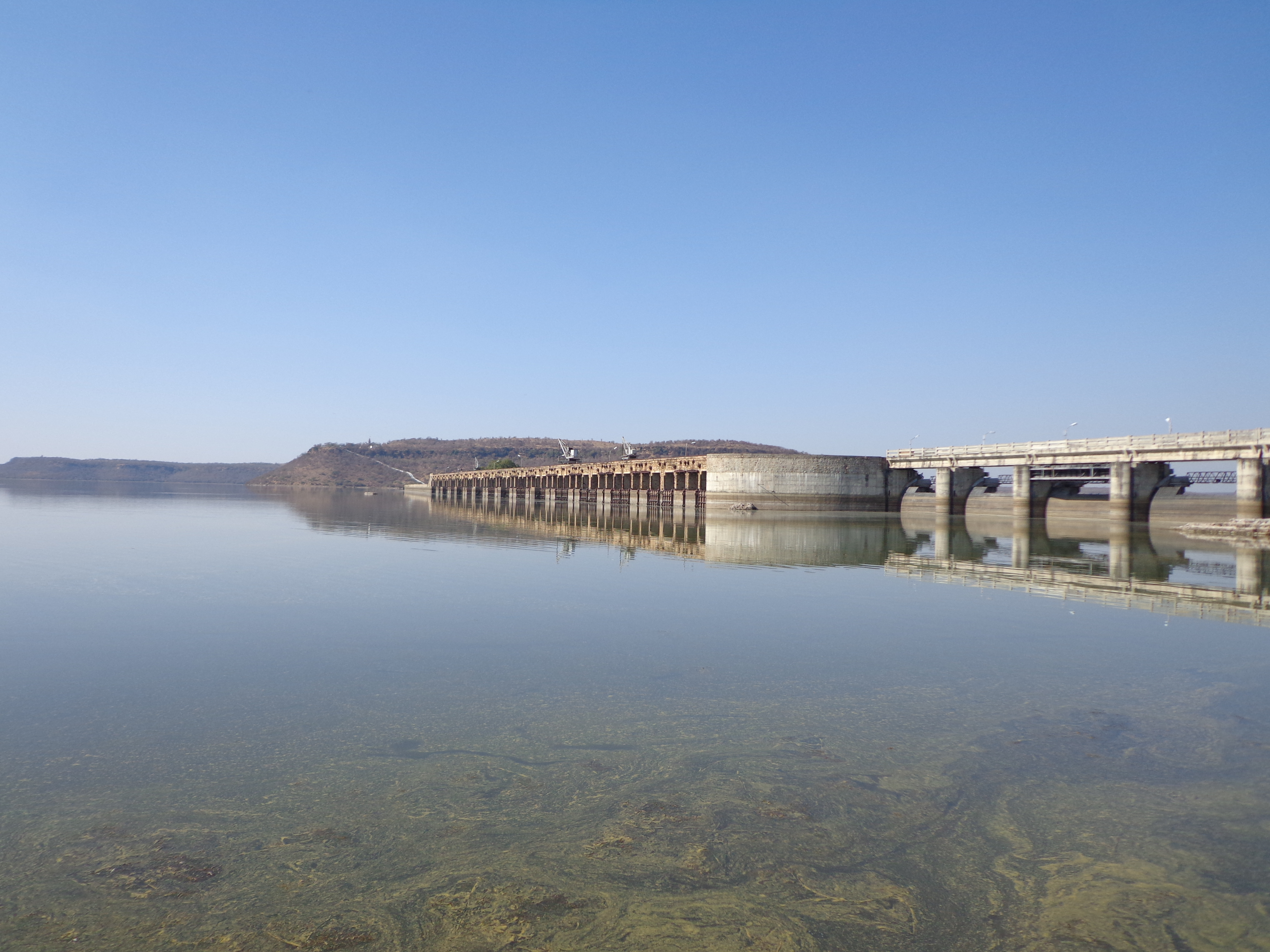
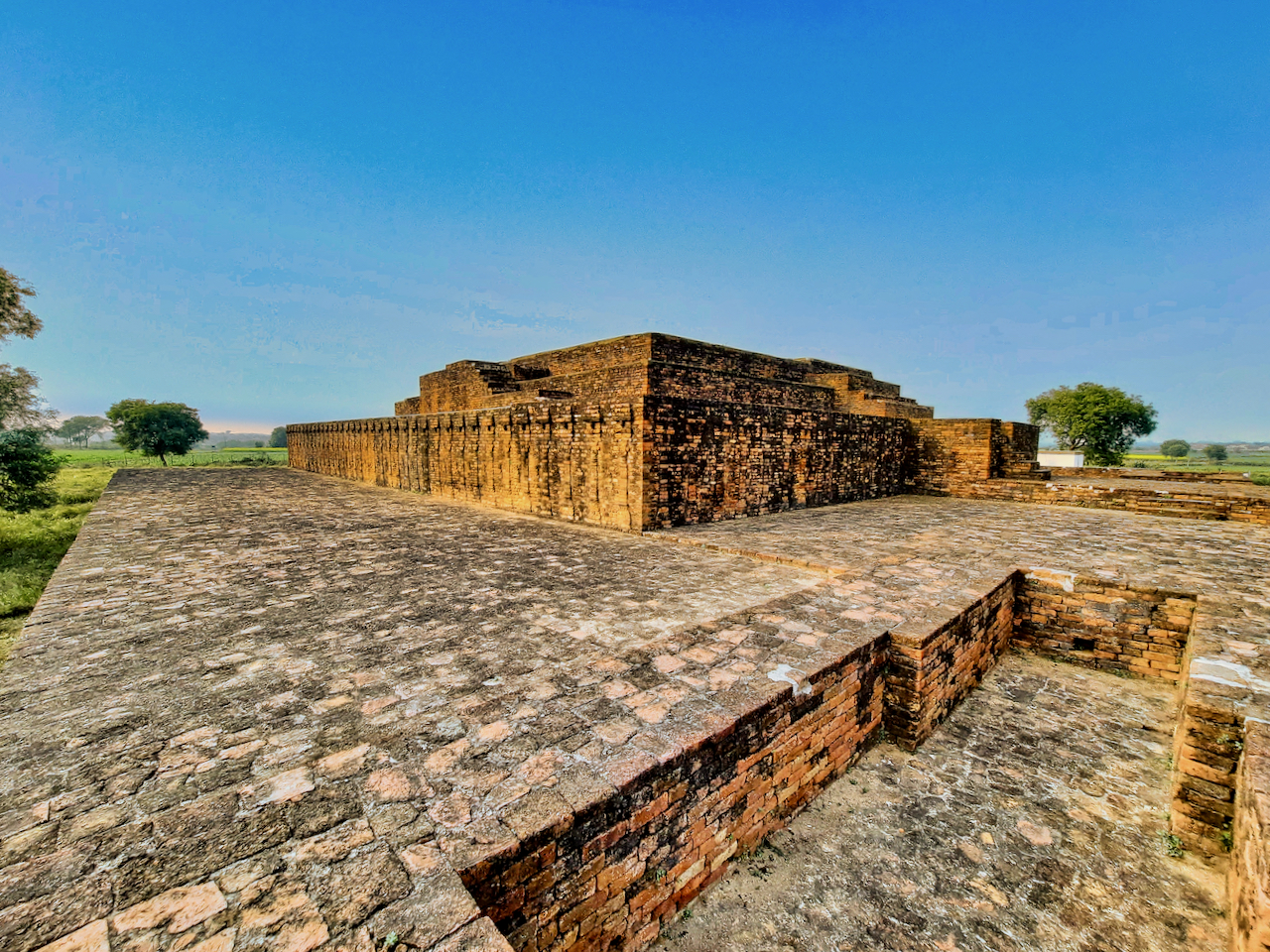
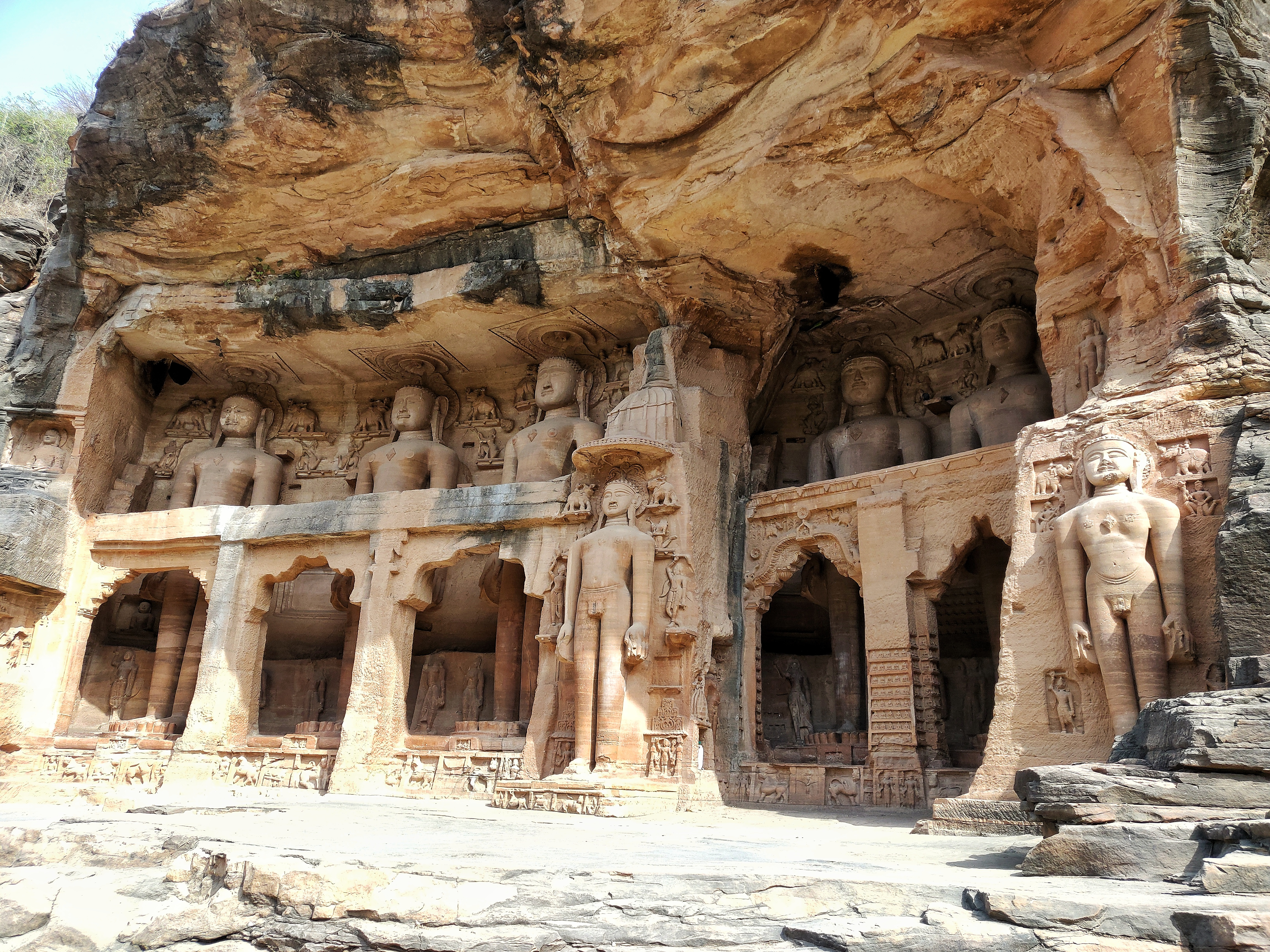
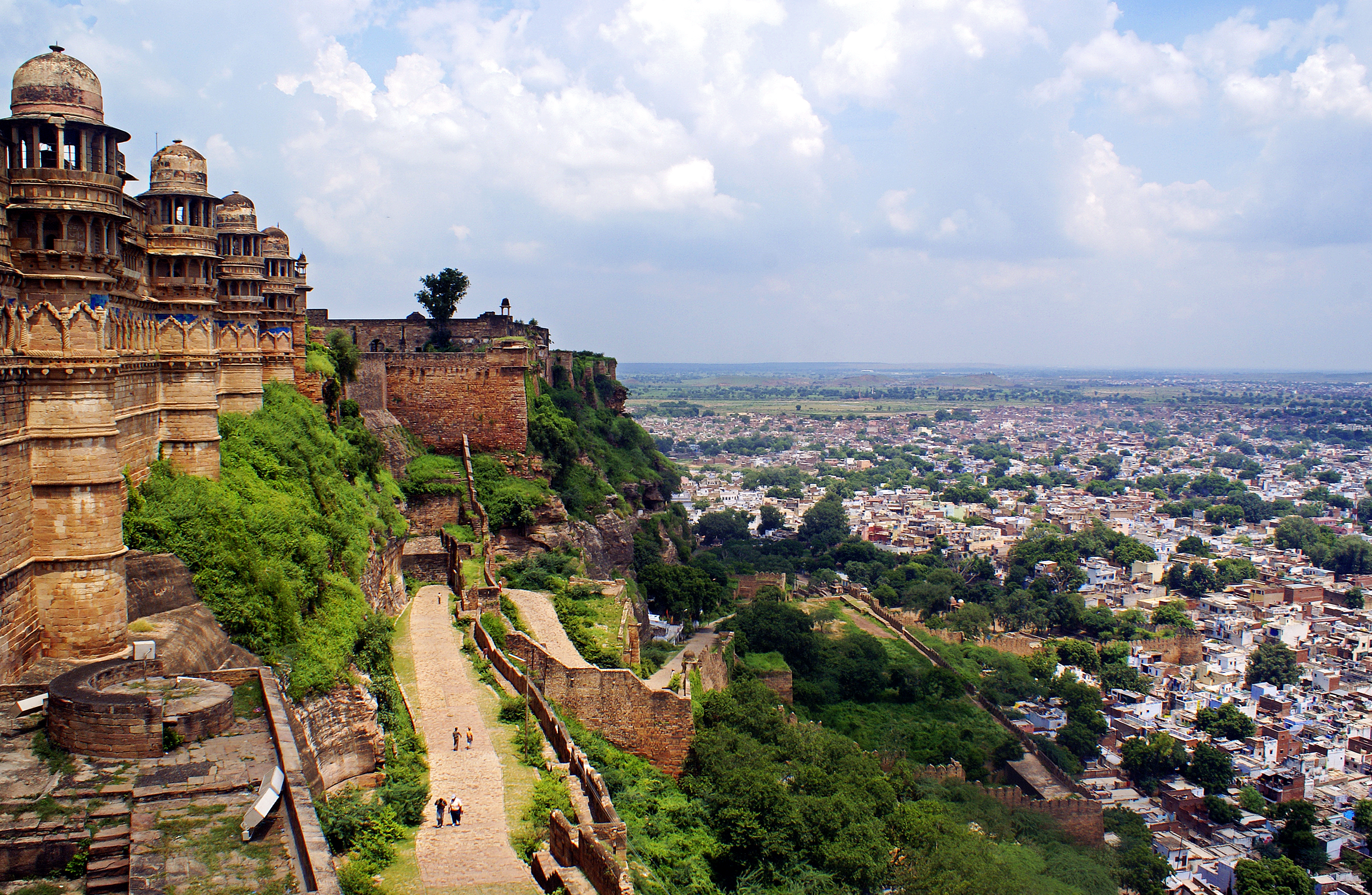
- Clockwise from top-left: Jai Vilas Mahal, Tigra Dam, Gopachal Parvat, view of Gwalior from Gwalior Fort, Vishnu temple in Pawaya

- Location of Gwalior district in Madhya Pradesh
- Country: India
- State: Madhya Pradesh
- Division: Gwalior
- Headquarters: Gwalior
- Tehsils: 1. Gwalior, 2. Bhitarwar, 3. Dabra 4. Chinor 5. City Center 6. Ghatigaon 7. Morar

Government
  - Lok Sabha constituencies: Gwalior (shared with Shivpuri district)
  - Vidhan Sabha constituencies: 1. Gwalior Rural, 2. Gwalior, 3. Gwalior East, 4. Gwalior South, 5. Bhitarwar and 6. Dabra

Area
  - Total: 4,560 km^{2} (1,760 sq mi)

Population (2011)
  - Total: 2,032,036
  - Density: 446/km^{2} (1,150/sq mi)

Demographics
  - Literacy: 77 per cent
  - Sex ratio: 864
- Time zone: UTC+05:30 (IST)
- Website: gwalior.nic.in

Gwalior district (Hindi pronunciation: [gʋaːlɪjəɾ]) is one of the 52 districts of Madhya Pradesh state in central India. The historic city of Gwalior is its administrative headquarters. Other cities and towns in this district are Antari, Bhitarwar, Bilaua, Dabra, Morar Cantonment, Pichhore, and Tekanpur. The district is at the centre of the Gird region.

The district has an area of 4,560 km^{2}, and a population 2,032,036 (2011 census), a 25% increase from the 2001 census. Kaushlendra Vikram Singh has been the district collector since March 2020.

== Geography ==
Located in a transitional zone between the Malwa plateau and the Gangetic plain in Upper (Northern) Madhya Pradesh, Gwalior district consists of several distinct geographical areas. North and east of Gwalior city there is a broad alluvial plain, mostly flat and covered in dumat, parua, and kabar soils. The central part of the district, around Gwalior, is somewhat hilly, with sandstone outcrops that have often served as a source for building materials. These hills represent an extension of the Vindhyas, and their soil is often poorly suited for agriculture except in valleys and depressions. The average height of this hilly tract is about 80 feet above sea level.

In the west is a plateau region, representing an extension of the Malwa plateau. This area is also hilly and some of it is covered by forests. The highest points are at Tor hill (at 1,454 feet above sea level) in the Sirkoli forest and Din hill (1,420 feet) in Rehat reserve forest.

The Sind is the main river in Gwalior district. It begins in Vidisha district and then enters the southern plains of Gwalior at around 25°47' N. Much of the southeastern part of Gwalior district is an alluvial plain around the Sind and its tributaries. Other rivers that traverse the district include the Sank, Sonrekha, Morar, Vaishali, Nun, Chachond, and Asan. Because of the porous soil, all the rivers have eroded their banks to create ravines along their sides. This is more pronounced in the northern plain, and especially along the upper Vaishali river. Other rivers in the north include the Sank, Sonrekha, and Maran rivers. The Parbati river, which originates in Shivpuri district, forms the boundary for part of Gwalior district before crossing through the southern part of the district and then joining the Sind at Pawaya.

=== Climate ===
In the summer season the climate is very hot, the shade temperature rising frequently to around 44 °C (112 °F), but in the winter months (from November to February inclusive) it is usually temperate and for short periods extremely cold.

=== Wildlife ===
Because of the prevailing dry climate in the area and the generally hard, shallow soil, Gwalior district does not have particularly dense vegetation. There are some forests in hilly areas, but the trees are somewhat stunted and not very large. Tree types include dho, kardhai, tendu (Diospyros melanoxylon, khair (Acacia catechu), salai (Boswellia serrata), ber (Ziziphus mauritiana), chhola (Butea monosperma), jamrasi (Elaeodendron glaucum), and reenjee, along with semal (Salmalia malabaricum), kareh (Sterculia urens), bhilwa (Semecarpus anacardium), babool (Acacia arbica), and teak (Tectona grandis). In some areas, there is little vegetation at all, with only sporadic, stunted plants such as siari, ber, and chhola.

Gwalior district has a diverse animal population, particularly in the forested areas. Prominent birds native to the area include the grey partridge, the snipe, and the peafowl. Mammals include leopards, cheetahs, bears, lakkarbaghas, deer, neelgai, rabbits, and monkeys.

Various fish species are found in bodies of water in Gwalior district. The mahseer is a common fish, often found in rocky rivers as well as the Sank, Asan, Parbhati, and Sind rivers. Among the Labeo group, the rohu and kalbasus are commonly found in the Sank and Asan rivers. Murrels and mullets are found in practically every body of running water, and a variety of the Indian trout is found in the Morar river. Freshwater shark are also common, especially in the Tigra and Pagara tanks. Other common fishes include the katla and the tengra.

== Divisions ==
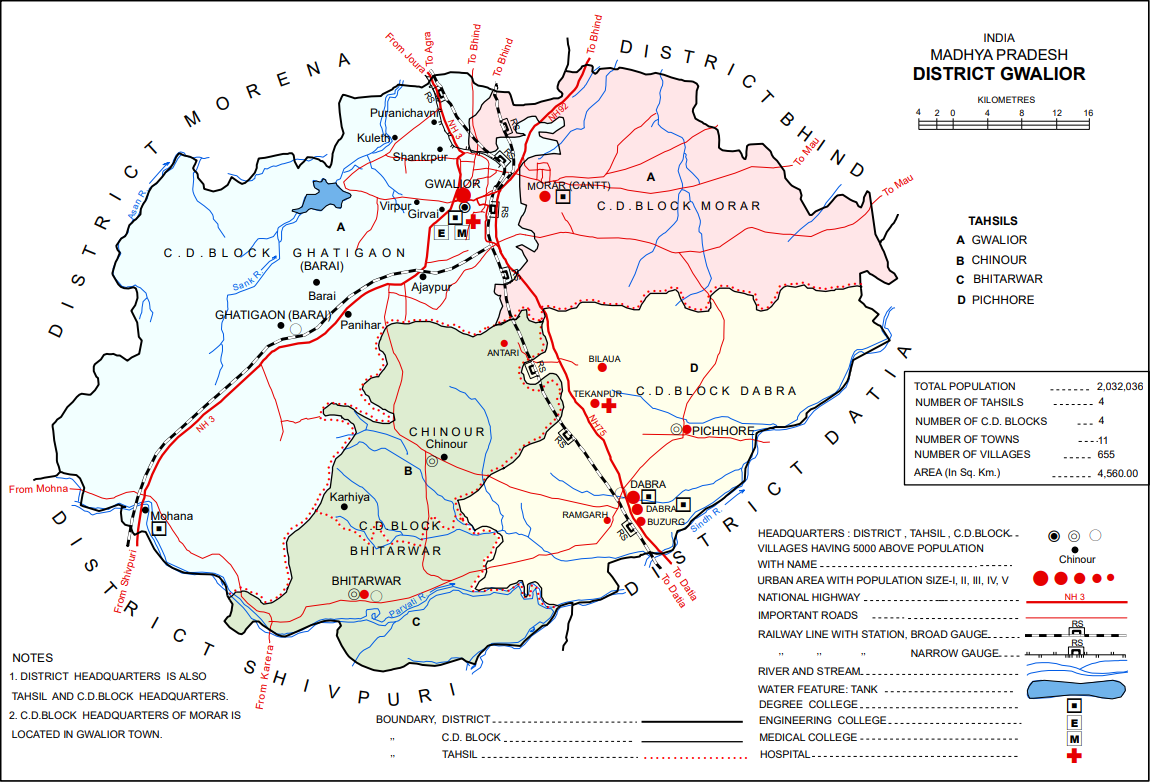
Map showing the divisions of Gwalior district

The district comprises 4 tehsils: Gwalior (formerly, Gird), Bhitarwar, Dabra (formerly, Pichore), and Chinour. There area also 4 community development blocks: Ghatigaon (Barai), Morar, Dabra, and Bhitarwar. There are 655 revenue villages in the district, of which 618 are inhabited.

There are six Madhya Pradesh Vidhan Sabha constituencies in this district. These are Gwalior Rural, Gwalior, Gwalior East, Gwalior South, Bhitarwar and Dabra. All of these are part of Gwalior Lok Sabha constituency.

- Currently, there are 10 tehsils in the district -
1. Gwalior
2. Dabra
3. Bhitarwar
4. Chinor
5. Ghatigaon
6. Tansen
7. Murar
8. City Centre
9. Gwalior Rural
10. Pichhore

== Demographics ==
Historical population
| Year | Pop. | ±% p.a. |
|---|---|---|
| 1901 | 355,196 | — |
| 1911 | 289,568 | −2.02% |
| 1921 | 301,397 | +0.40% |
| 1931 | 335,821 | +1.09% |
| 1941 | 405,832 | +1.91% |
| 1951 | 478,335 | +1.66% |
| 1961 | 594,362 | +2.20% |
| 1971 | 775,724 | +2.70% |
| 1981 | 1,010,801 | +2.68% |
| 1991 | 1,293,567 | +2.50% |
| 2001 | 1,632,109 | +2.35% |
| 2011 | 2,032,036 | +2.22% |

Religions in Gwalior district (2011)
| Religion | Percent |
| Hinduism | 90.32% |
| Islam | 6.98% |
| Sikhism | 1.22% |
| Jainism | 0.89% |
| Other or not stated | 0.59% |

According to the 2011 census Gwalior district has a population of 2,032,036, roughly equal to the nation of Slovenia or the US state of New Mexico. This gives it a ranking of 227th in India (out of a total of 640). The district has a population density of 445 inhabitants per square kilometre (1,150/sq mi) . Its population growth rate over the decade 2001-2011 was 24.41%. Gwalior has a sex ratio of 862 females for every 1000 males, and a literacy rate of 77.93%. 62.69% of the population live in urban areas. Scheduled Castes and Tribes made up 19.34% and 3.55% of the population respectively.

Languages of Gwalior district (2011)
1. Hindi (96.6%)
2. Punjabi (1.08%)
3. Others (2.35%)

At the time of the 2011 Census of India, 96.57% of the population in the district spoke Hindi and 1.08% Bundeli as their first language.

== Tourist places ==
- Gujari Mahal Archaeological Museum
