= Tehsil =

Administrative division in India and Pakistan

A tehsil (Hindustani pronunciation: [t̪ɛɦˈsiːl]), also known as a tahsil, taluk, taluq, or taluka (from Arabic تعلق), is a local administrative division in India and Pakistan. It is a subdistrict within a district including the designated populated place that serves as its administrative centre, with possible additional towns, and usually a number of villages. The terms in India have replaced earlier terms, such as pargana (pergunnah) and thana.

In Andhra Pradesh and Telangana, a newer unit called mandal (circle) has come to replace the tehsil system. A mandal is generally smaller than a tehsil, and is meant for facilitating local self-government in the panchayat system. In West Bengal, Bihar, and Jharkhand, community development blocks (CDBs) are the empowered grassroots administrative unit, replacing tehsils.

The Tehsil office is primarily responsible for land revenue administration, besides election and executive functions. It is the ultimate executive agency for land records and related administrative matters. The chief official is called the tehsildar or, less officially, the talukdar or taluka muktiarkar. In the Indian administrative context Tehsil or taluk is considered a sub-district. In some instances, tehsils overlap with "blocks" (panchayat union blocks or panchayat development blocks or CDBs). Tehsils fall under the land and revenue department and are headed by the tehsildar, whereas blocks fall under the rural development department and headed by the block development officer. Although they may cover the same or similar geographical areas, the two perform different administrative functions.

Although tehsils may on occasion share the same area with a subdivision of a revenue division, known as revenue blocks, the two are distinct. For example, Raipur district in Chhattisgarh is administratively divided into 13 tehsils and 15 revenue blocks. Nevertheless, the two are often conflated.

== Background ==
India, as a vast country, is subdivided into many states and union territories for administrative purposes. Further divisions of these states are known as districts (zile, singular zilaa, Hindi: ज़िले, ज़िला). These districts are again divided into many subdivisions, which are the tehsils or taluks. These subdivisions are again divided into revenue villages. Initially, this was done for collecting land revenue and administration purposes. But now these subdivisions are governed in tandem with other departments of government like education, agriculture, irrigation, health, police, etc. The different departments of state government generally have offices at tehsil or taluk level to facilitate good governance and to provide facilities to common people easily.

== Nomenclature ==
In India, the term tehsil is commonly used in eastern states like Odisha; commonly spoken as (ତହସିଲ / Tahasil) & all northern states. In Maharashtra, Gujarat, Goa, Karnataka, Kerala and Tamil Nadu, taluka or taluk is more common. In Eastern India, instead of tehsils, the term Subdivision is used in Odisha, Bihar, Assam, Jharkhand and West Bengal, as well as large parts of Northeast India (Manipur, Meghalaya, Mizoram, Sikkim and Tripura). In Arunachal Pradesh and Nagaland, they are called circle.

Tehsil/tahsil and taluk/taluka and the variants are used as English words without further translation. Since these terms are unfamiliar to English speakers outside the subcontinent, the word county has sometimes been provided as a gloss, on the basis that a tehsil, like a county, is an administrative unit hierarchically above the local city, town, or village, but subordinate to a larger state or province. India and Pakistan have an intermediate level of hierarchy (or more than one, at least in parts of India): the district, also sometimes translated as county. In neither case is the analogy very exact.

== Organization setup ==
Tehsildar is the chief or key government officer of each tehsil or taluka. In some states different nomenclature like talukdar, mamledar, amaldar, mandal officer is used. In many states of India, the tehsildar functions as the executive magistrate of that tehsil. Each tehsil will have an office called tehsil office or tehsildar office at a designated place within tehsil area known as tehsil headquarters. Tehsildar is the incharge of tehsil office. This is similar to district office or district collector at district level.

Throughout India, there is a three-tier local body/Panchayat system within the state. At the top is the zila/zilla panchayat (parishad). Taluka/mandal panchayat/panchayat samiti/community development block is the second layer of this system and below them are the gram panchayats or village panchayats. These panchayats at all three levels have elected members from eligible voters of particular subdivisions. These elected members form the bodies which help the administration in policy-making, development works, and bringing grievances of the common public to the notice of the administration.

Nayabat is the lower part of tehsil which have some powers like tehsil. It can be understood as tehsil is the sub-district of a district, similarly, Nayabat is the sub-tehsil of a tehsil.

Every Taluk in India has a designated place(city/town/village) as its headquarter's within its jurisdictional area.The Taluku office is where Tehsildar or Amaldar or Talukdar the government official who administers the Taluku operates from Taluku headquarter's. He has to visit villages coming within his jurisdictional Taluku as per requirement. Taluku office is under the control of Revenue department of respective state government in Republic of India.Each Taluku office in Karnataka state has different sections like revenue, elections, land records, executive magistrate etc. which is looked after by section officers or Shirastedars/ Deputy Tahsildars. In state of Karnataka, India, each Taluk/Taluku is further divided into few Hobli consisting of many Grama Panchayat.

== See also ==
- Administrative divisions of India
  - List of subdistricts in India
- Taluqdar – A land holder and tax collector
- Tehsil in Pakistan
  - List of tehsils in Pakistan – Fourth-level administrative divisions of Pakistan
- Tehsildar – A revenue administrative officer
- Village accountant – Administrative government position in rural parts of the Indian sub-continent
