= India–United States relations =

- India: United States

Diplomatic mission
- Embassy of India, Washington, D.C.: Embassy of the United States, New Delhi

Envoy
- Ambassador Vinay Mohan Kwatra: Ambassador Sergio Gor

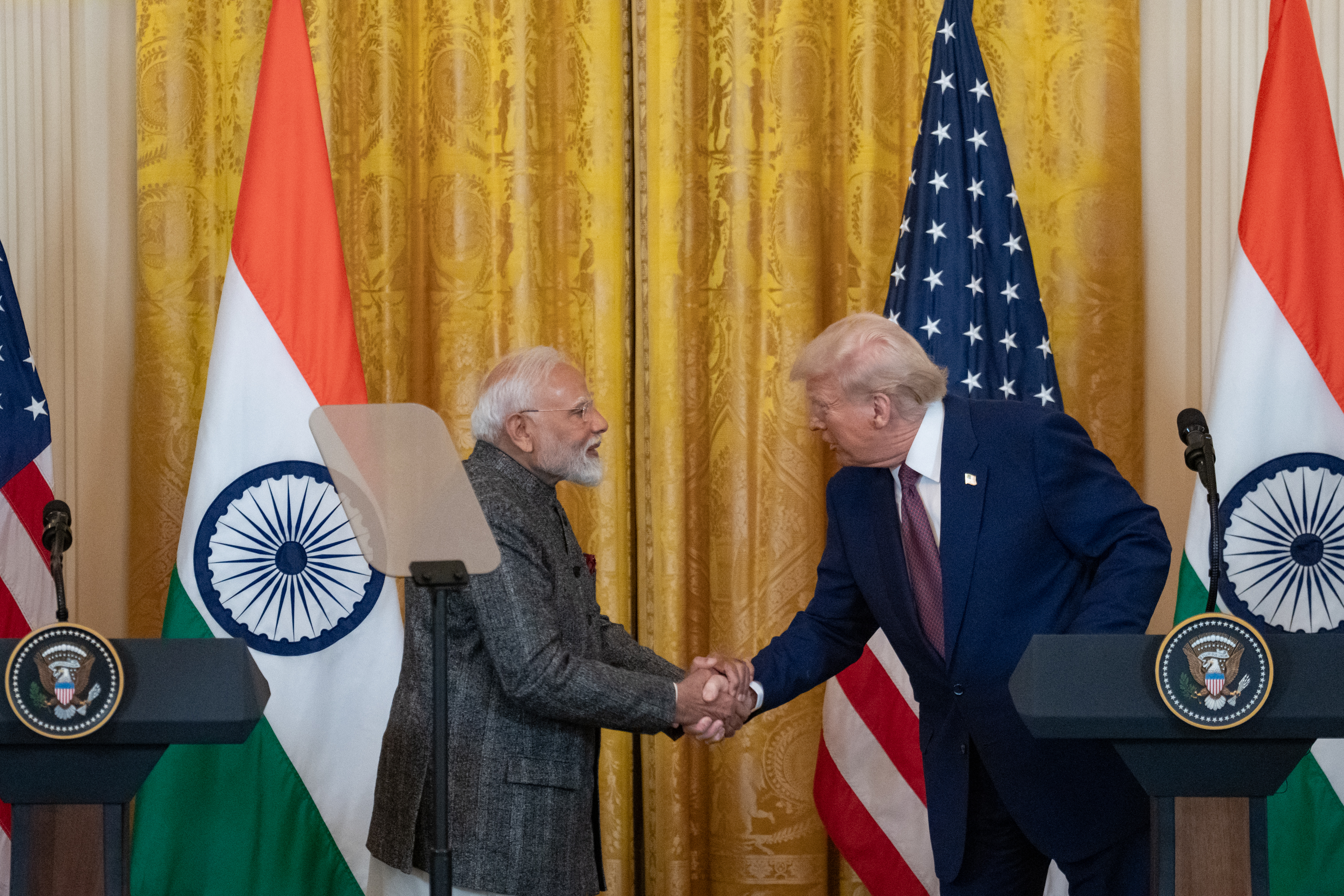
Prime Minister Narendra Modi with President Donald Trump at the White House in 2025

The Republic of India and the United States established diplomatic relations in 1947 following Indian independence. Relations between the two countries have developed in areas including defense, trade, technology, education and energy. The two countries have also cooperated on regional and international issues, while differences have remained over trade, energy policy and other matters.

In early 2026, energy policy became a significant issue in India–United States relations. The United States sought changes to India's purchases of Russian oil, while India considered the economic and logistical implications of changing its sources of crude oil.

The United States and India announced a trade agreement in February 2026. President Donald Trump said that India had agreed to stop purchasing Russian oil and increase imports from the United States and potentially Venezuela, alongside reductions in tariffs on Indian goods. Indian officials said that energy security and diversification remained priorities and that refiners would require time to complete previously arranged Russian oil shipments.

Reuters reported that India's imports of Russian oil had declined in January 2026 amid the trade negotiations, while Indian energy officials indicated that the country was broadening its sources of crude oil.

== Background ==
=== Early engagement and Cold War context ===
India and the United States began engaging with one another soon after India’s independence in 1947, with early cooperation in areas such as food security, education, and institution-building. However, the broader geopolitical dynamics of the Cold War shaped the trajectory of the relationship. In 1955, Pakistan joined the Baghdad Pact, later renamed the Central Treaty Organization (CENTO), in which the United States held observer status, resulting in a limited strategic alignment between Washington and Islamabad.

India, prioritizing strategic autonomy and decolonization-era sovereignty, pursued an independent foreign policy and was a founding member of the Non-Aligned Movement in 1961, seeking to avoid formal alignment with either bloc during the Cold War. While India also developed close ties with the Soviet Union during this period, engagement with the United States continued in parallel through diplomacy, development assistance, and people-to-people exchanges. Differences over regional security, including U.S. support for Pakistan during the Indo-Pakistani War of 1971, led to periods of strain, but did not sever bilateral ties.

The end of the Cold War and the dissolution of the Soviet Union in 1991 marked a turning point. India’s economic liberalization and the emergence of a unipolar world created new opportunities for convergence, leading both countries to reassess the relationship in light of shared democratic values and complementary interests.

=== Expansion into a comprehensive partnership ===
In the twenty-first century, India’s foreign policy has emphasized strategic autonomy while actively engaging major global powers to advance national development and regional stability. This approach aligned with growing U.S. recognition of India as a key partner in Asia and beyond.

Under the administrations of Presidents George W. Bush and Barack Obama, bilateral relations deepened substantially, with Washington acknowledging India’s core interests and supporting its rise as a responsible global power. Landmark developments included the expansion of bilateral trade and investment, enhanced cooperation on counterterrorism and global security, and U.S. support for India’s greater role in global governance institutions. India’s admission into major multilateral export control regimes, along with U.S. backing for its entry into the Nuclear Suppliers Group, further underscored growing trust and strategic alignment.

Since 2014, strategic cooperation has accelerated across defense, technology, and regional security. The United States designated India a "Major Defense Partner," reflecting a high degree of confidence and long-term commitment in defense collaboration. Cooperation has also expanded within multilateral and minilateral frameworks such as the Quad and the I2U2 Group, reflecting shared interests in a free, open, and inclusive Indo-Pacific and in addressing global challenges through partnership.

== History ==
=== Age of Exploration ===
The term "Indian", which has been used as an alternative for the Indigenous peoples of the Americas, originated with Christopher Columbus, who, in his search for India, thought that he had arrived in the East Indies. This historical misnomer has persisted over the centuries, shaping cultural perceptions and narratives surrounding Native American identity.

=== American Revolution, the East India Company, and early America context ===
Prior to the 1770s, Americans admired the expansion of the British Empire, feeling proud to be part of an expansion of British influence around the world. Some Indians (from places such as Bombay and Bengal) were sent to the latter for slavery or indentured servitude. Today, descendants of such East Indian slaves may have a small percent of DNA from Asian ancestors but it likely falls below the detectable levels for today's DNA tests. The American Founding Fathers maintained awareness and admiration of affairs in Mysore in its resistance to London. The American Continental Congress, unable to send a full expedition to the subcontinent, instead encouraged its pirate navy to attack East India Company ships.

The flag of the East India Company is said to have inspired the Continental Union Flag of 1775, ultimately inspiring the current flag of the United States, as both flags were of the same design. Mysorean rockets were also used in the Battle of Baltimore, and are mentioned in "The Star-Spangled Banner", the national anthem of the United States: And the rockets' red glare, the bombs bursting in air.

=== Under British Raj (1858–1947) ===
Indian–American relations
- India: United States

==== Religious connections ====
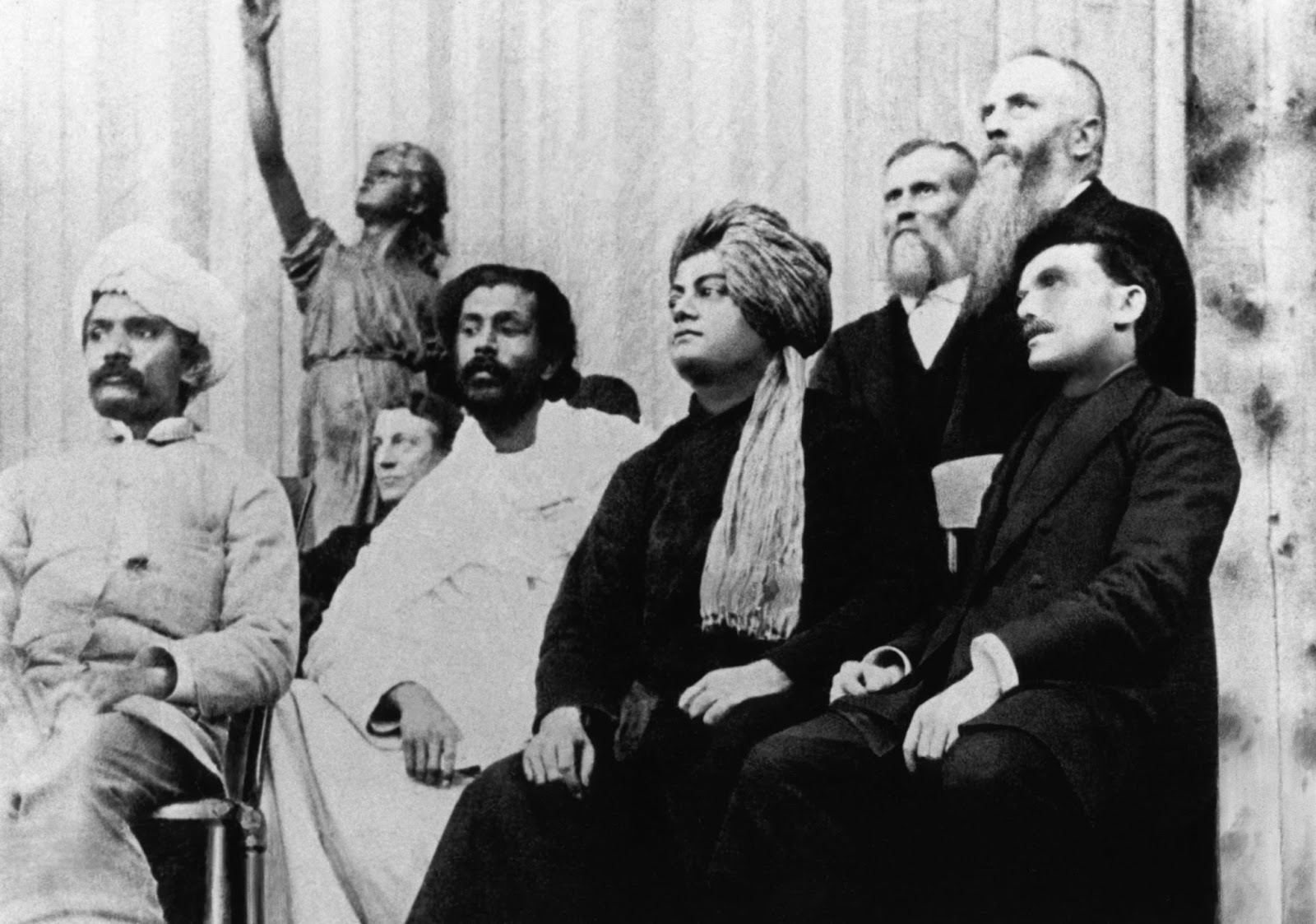
Swami Vivekananda at the Parliament of Religions with Virchand Gandhi, Hewivitarne Dharmapala, and A. G. Bonet-Maury in September 1893

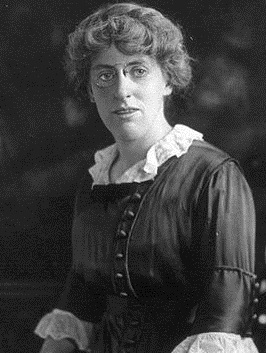
Margaret Woodrow Wilson, daughter of Woodrow Wilson, left to India for her later life

The relationships between India in the days of the British Raj and the United States were thick. Swami Vivekananda promoted Yoga and Vedanta in the United States at the World's Parliament of Religions in Chicago, during the World's Fair in 1893. Mark Twain visited India in 1896 and described it in his travelogue Following the Equator with both revulsion and attraction before concluding that India was the only foreign land he dreamed about or longed to see again. Regarding India, Americans learned more from English writer Rudyard Kipling. Mahatma Gandhi had an important influence on the philosophy of non-violence promoted by American civil rights movement leader Martin Luther King Jr. in the 1950s.

==== President Franklin D. Roosevelt ====
In the 1930s and early-1940s, US President Franklin D. Roosevelt voiced strong support to the Indian independence movement despite being allies with Britain. The first significant immigration from India before 1965 involved Sikh farmers going to California in the early-twentieth century.

==== Case of Bhagat Singh Thind ====
United States v. Bhagat Singh Thind was a landmark legal case in the United States that reverberated through issues of immigration, citizenship, and race. In 1920, Bhagat Singh Thind, an Indian Sikh man, applied for naturalization under the Naturalization Act of 1906, which permitted naturalization only for "free white persons" and "persons of African nativity or descent." Thind contended that his high-caste Indian heritage aligned with the scientific definition of "Caucasian," thereby qualifying him for citizenship."

The case reached the Supreme Court of the United States in 1923. However, the Court unanimously ruled against Thind, asserting that while he might indeed meet the scientific classification of "Caucasian," the term "white person" in the naturalization laws was construed to apply exclusively to individuals of European descent. This pivotal decision had far-reaching implications, not only for Thind but for countless other South Asians aspiring for US citizenship. It set a legal precedent that explicitly excluded South Asians from being considered "white" for naturalization purposes, effectively prohibiting their path to citizenship.

=== During World War II ===
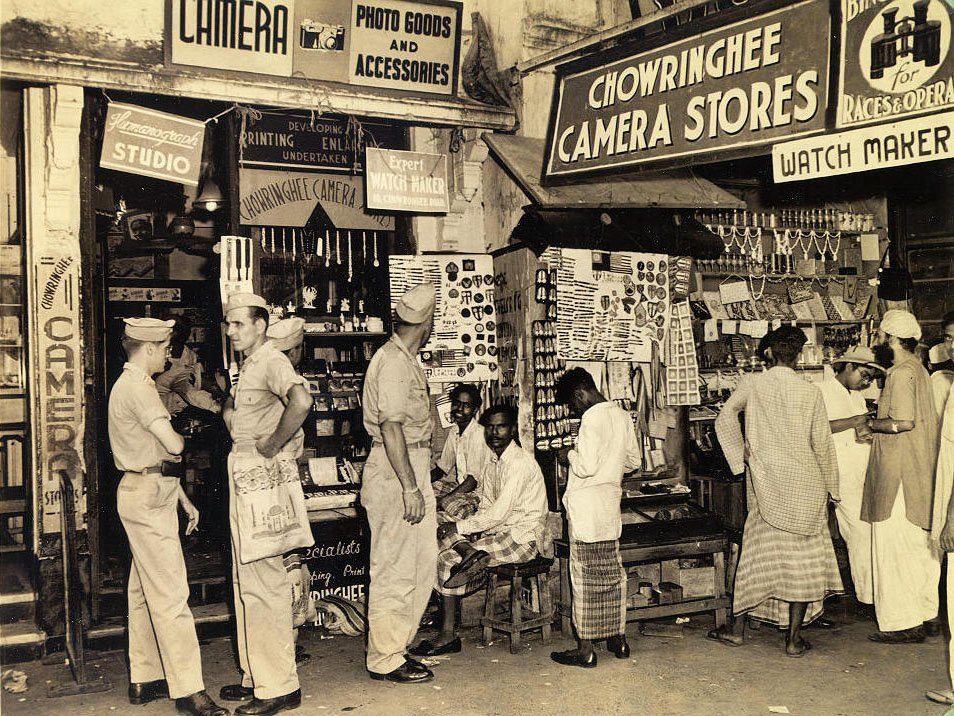
American G.I.s at a market in Calcutta in present-day Kolkata in 1945

During World War II, India became the main base for the American China Burma India Theater (CBI) in the war against Japan. Tens of thousands of American servicemen arrived, bringing all sorts of advanced technology, and currency; they left in 1945. Serious tension erupted over American demands, led by US President Franklin D. Roosevelt, that India be given independence, a proposition Churchill vehemently rejected. For years, Roosevelt encouraged British disengagement from India. The American position was based on an opposition to Europeans having colonies and a practical concern for the outcome of the war, and the expectation of a large American role in a post-independence era. Churchill threatened to resign if Roosevelt continued to push his case, causing Roosevelt to back down. Meanwhile, India became the main American staging base to fly aid to China. During World War II, the Panagarh Airport in Bengal Province of India was used as a supply transport airfield from 1942 to 1945 by the United States Army Air Forces Tenth Air Force and as a repair and maintenance depot for B-24 Liberator heavy bombers by Air Technical Service Command.

=== After Independence (1947–1997) ===
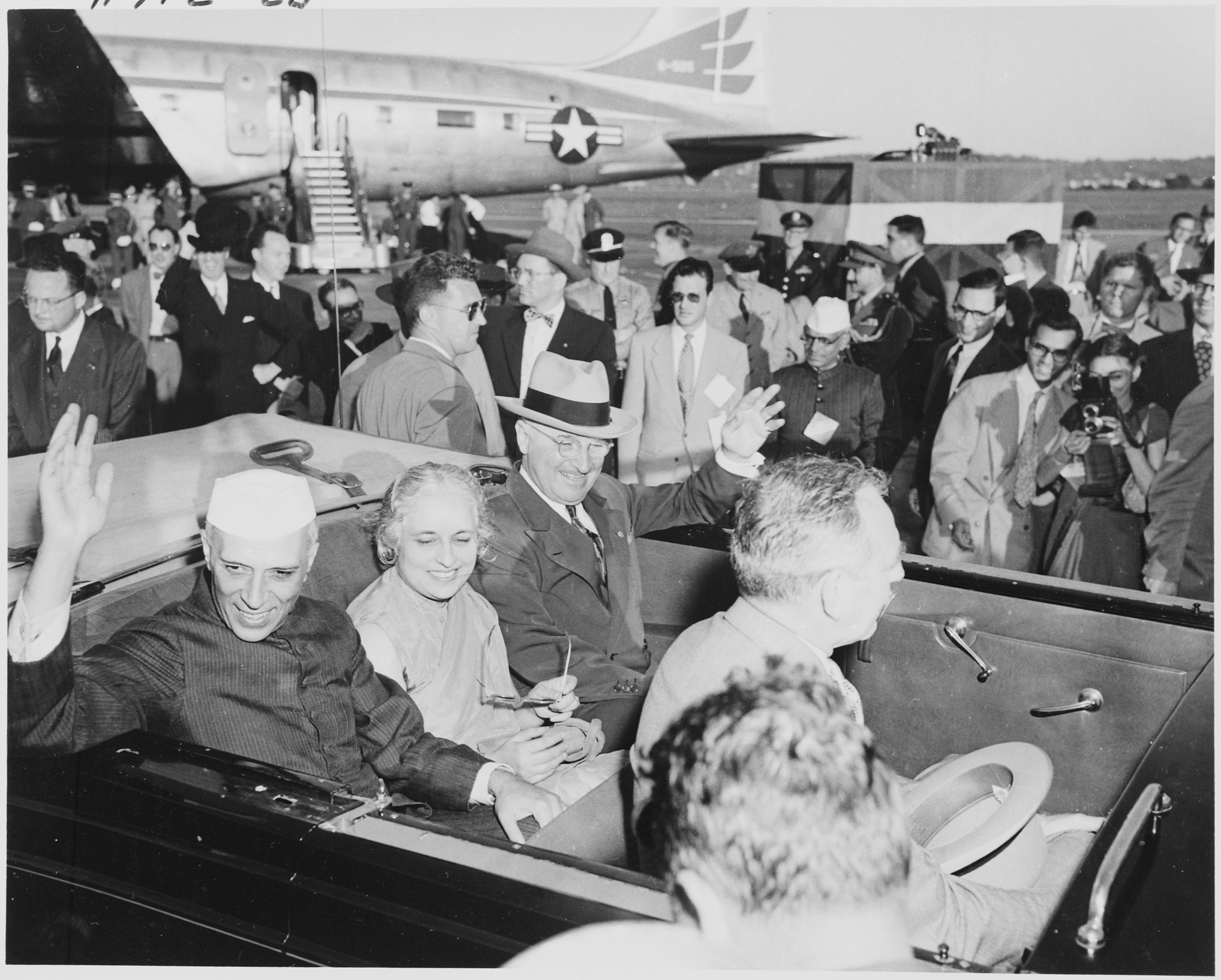
US President Harry S. Truman and Indian Prime Minister Jawaharlal Nehru with Nehru's sister, Vijayalakshmi Pandit, Indian ambassador to the United States, in Washington, D.C. in October 1949

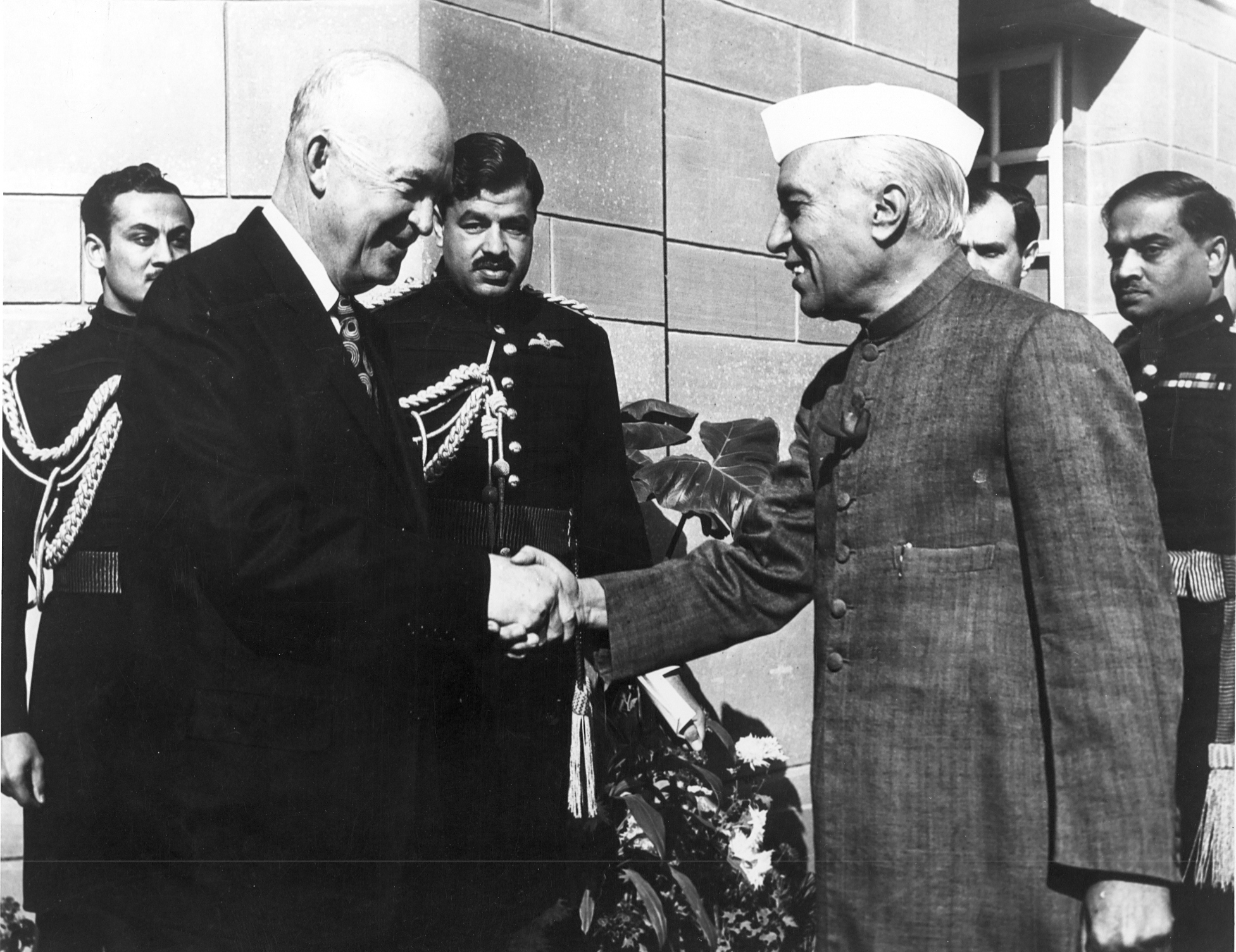
Indian Prime Minister Jawaharlal Nehru receiving US President Dwight D. Eisenhower at Parliament House prior to Eisenhower's address to a joint session of Parliament of India in 1959

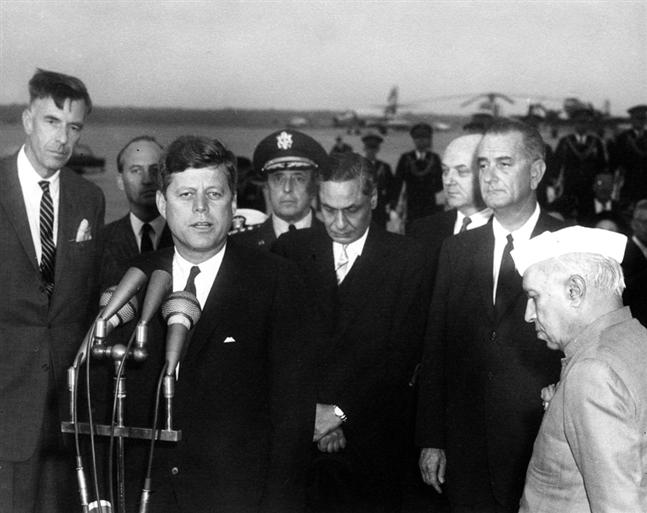
US ambassador to India John Kenneth Galbraith (left) and US President John F. Kennedy, US Vice President Lyndon B. Johnson, and Indian Prime Minister Jawaharlal Nehru at Joint Base Andrews in Prince George's County, Maryland in 1961

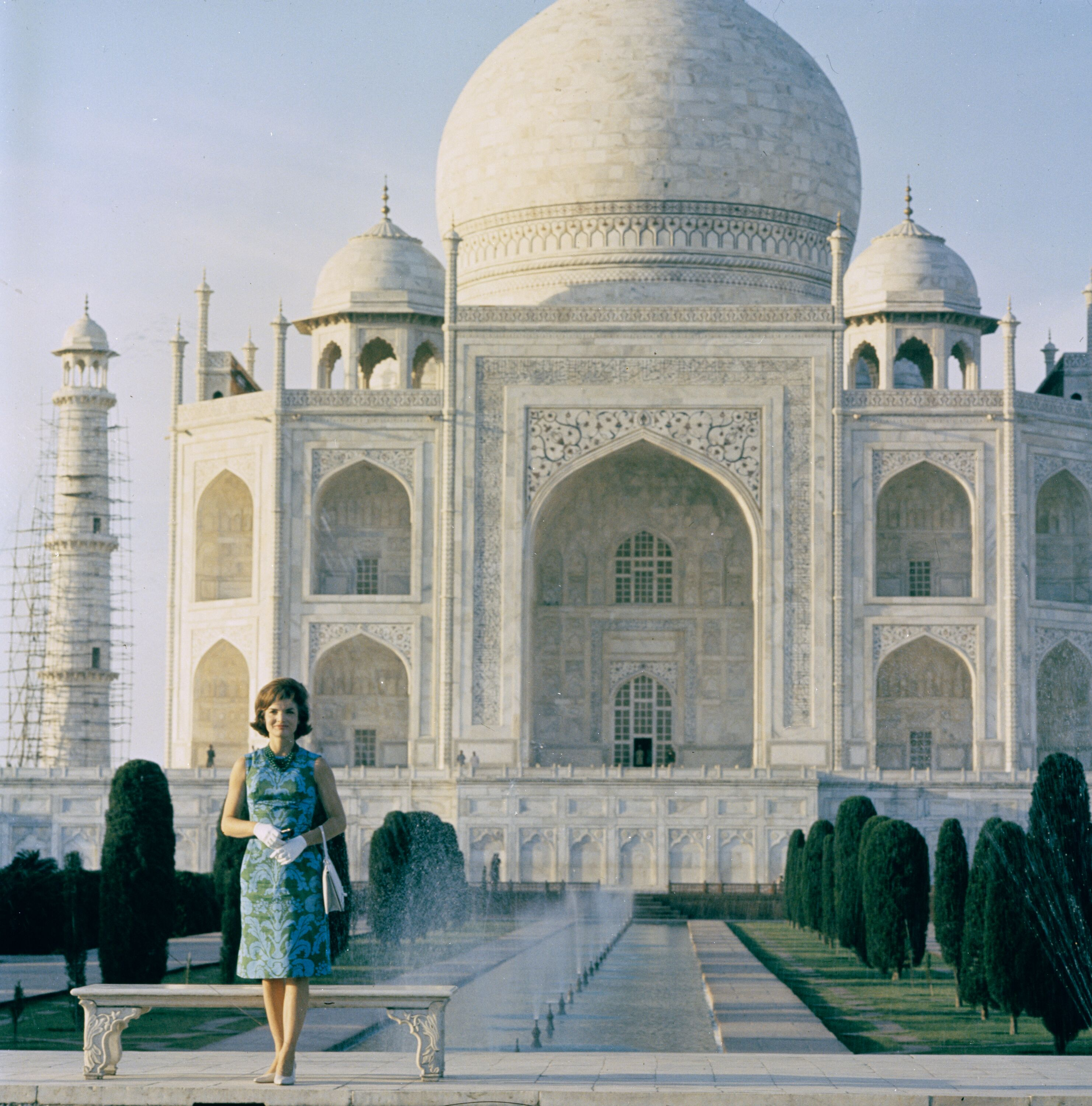
First lady Jacqueline Kennedy in front of the Taj Mahal in 1962.

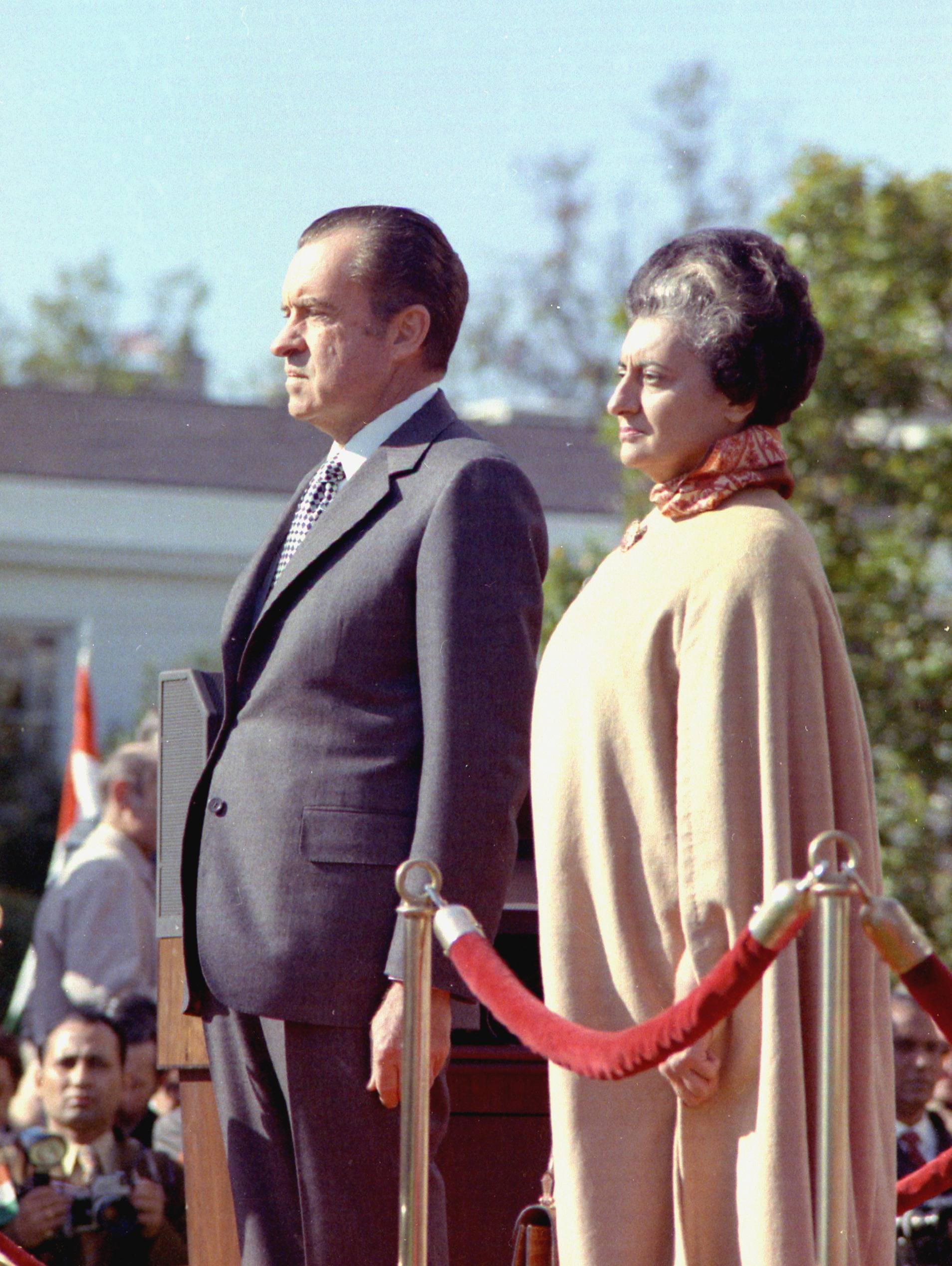
US President Richard Nixon at the arrival ceremony for Indian Prime Minister Indira Gandhi on the South Lawn of the White House in November 1971

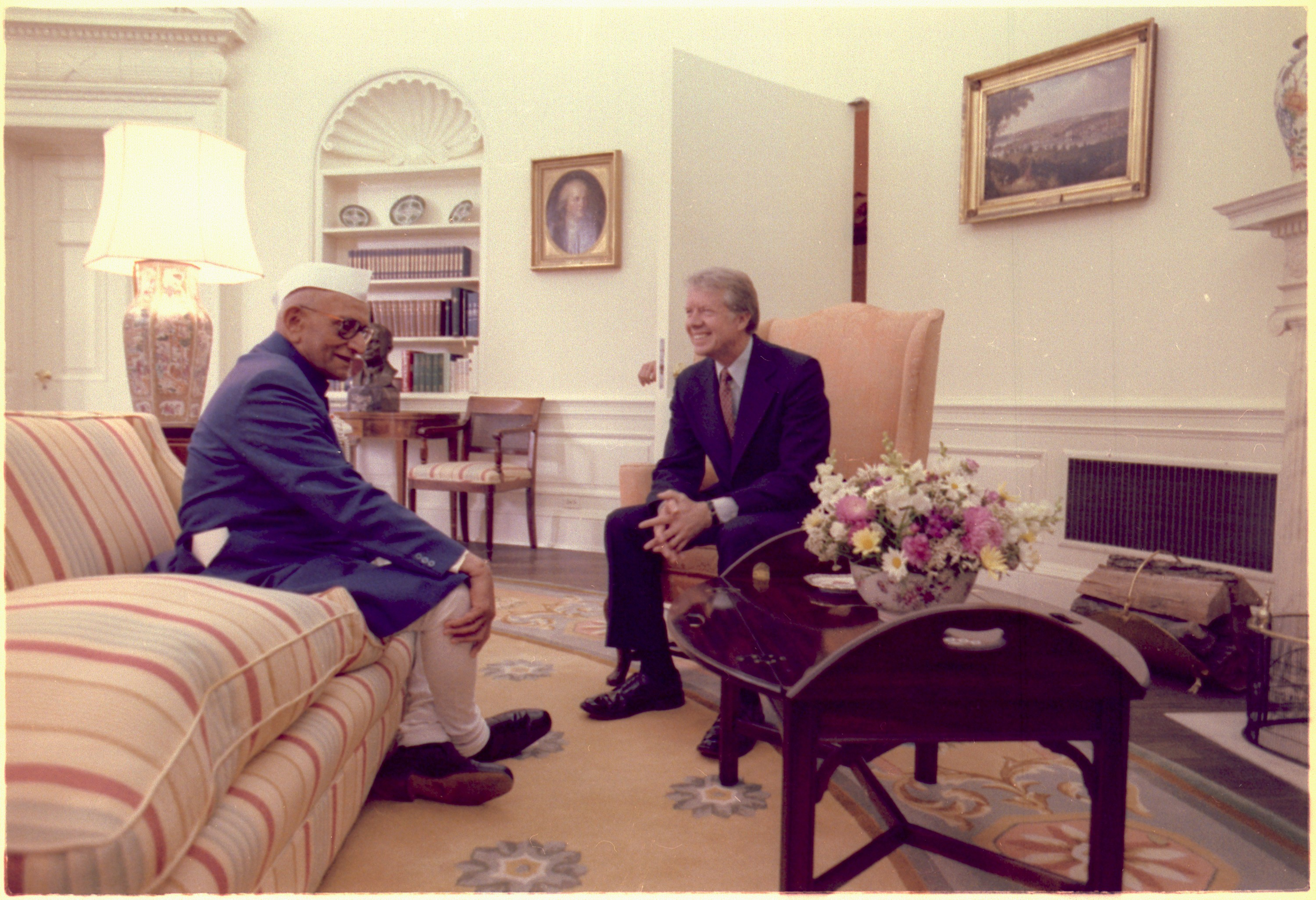
Indian Prime Minister Morarji Desai in the Oval Office with US President Jimmy Carter in June 1978

=== Nehru era ===
The United States under the Truman administration leaned towards favouring India in the late-1940s as a consequence of most US planners seeing India more valuable diplomatically than neighboring Pakistan. However, during the Cold War, Jawaharlal Nehru's policy of neutrality was cumbersome to many American observers. American Ambassador Henry F. Grady told the State Department in December 1947 that he had informed Nehru "that this is a question that cannot be straddled and that India should get on the democratic side immediately". In 1948, Nehru rejected American suggestions for resolving the Kashmir crisis via third party mediation.

Nehru chose United States as the first country to visit abroad as Prime Minister. However, this 1949 tour of the United States was "an undiplomatic disaster" that left bad feelings on both sides. Nehru and his top aide V. K. Krishna Menon discussed whether India should "align with United States 'somewhat' and build up our economic and military strength." The Truman administration was quite favorable and indicated it would give Nehru anything he asked for. Nehru refused, and thereby forfeited the chance for a gift of one million tons of wheat. The American Secretary of State Dean Acheson recognized Nehru's potential world role but added that he was "one of the most difficult men with whom I have ever had to deal." The American visit had some benefits in that Nehru gained widespread understanding and support for his nation, and he himself gained a much deeper understanding of the American outlook.

India rejected the American advice that it should not recognize the Communist conquest of China, but it did back the US when it supported the 1950 United Nations resolution condemning North Korea's aggression in the Korean War. India tried to act as a mediator to help end the war, and served as a conduit for diplomatic messages between the US and China. Although no Indian troops took part in the war, India did send a Medical Corps of 346 army doctors to help the UN side. Meanwhile, poor harvests forced India to ask for American aid for its food security, which was given starting in 1950. In the first dozen years of Indian independence (1947–59), the US provided $1.700,000,000 in aid; including $931,000,000 in food. The Soviet Union provided about half as much in monetary terms, however made much larger contributions in kind, taking the form of infrastructural aid; soft loans; technical knowledge transfer; economic planning and skills involved in the areas of steel mills; machine building; hydroelectric power; and other heavy industries, especially nuclear energy and space research. In 1961, the US pledged $1,000,000,000 in development loans, in addition to $1,300,000,000 of free food. President Dwight D. Eisenhower sent John Sherman Cooper as ambassador in 1956–57, who got along very well with Nehru.

In terms of rhetoric, Nehru—as both prime minister and foreign minister (1947–64)—promoted a moralistic rhetoric attacking both the Soviet bloc and the US and its bloc. Nehru tried to build a nonaligned movement, paying special attention to the many new nations in the Third World released from European colonial status at this time. President Eisenhower and his Secretary of State John Foster Dulles themselves used moralistic rhetoric to attack the evils of Communism.

In 1959, Eisenhower became the first US president to visit India to strengthen the staggering ties between the two nations. He was so supportive that the New York Times remarked, "It did not seem to matter much whether Nehru had actually requested or been given a guarantee that the US would help India to meet further Chinese Communist aggression. What mattered was the obvious strengthening of Indian–American friendship to a point where no such guarantee was necessary."

During John F. Kennedy's presidency from 1961 to 1963, India was considered a strategic partner and counterweight to the rise of Communist China. Kennedy said:

"Chinese Communists have been moving ahead the last 10 years. India has been making some progress, but if India does not succeed with her 450 million people, if she can't make freedom work, then people around the world are going to determine, particularly in the underdeveloped world, that the only way they can develop their resources is through the Communist system."

Relations took a nosedive when India annexed the Portuguese colony of Goa in 1961. The Kennedy administration condemned the armed action of the Indian government and demanded that all Indian forces be unconditionally withdrawn from Goan soil, at the same time, cutting foreign aid appropriations to India by 25 percent. In response, Menon, now the Minister of Defence, lectured Kennedy on the importance of US-Soviet compromise and dismissed the admonishments of the Kennedy administration as "vestige(s) of Western imperialism". The Kennedy administration openly supported India during the 1962 Sino-Indian war and considered the Chinese action as "blatant Chinese Communist aggression against India". The United States Air Force flew in arms, ammunition and clothing supplies to the Indian troops and the United States Navy sent the USS Kitty Hawk aircraft carrier from the Pacific Ocean to India, though it was recalled before it reached the Bay of Bengal since the crisis had passed. Kennedy insisted that Washington defend India as it would any ally, saying, "We should defend India, and therefore we will defend India."

=== Indira-Rajiv era ===
Following the assassination of Kennedy in 1963, India–US relations deteriorated gradually. While Kennedy's successor Lyndon B. Johnson sought to maintain relations with India to counter Communist China, he also sought to strengthen ties with Pakistan with the hopes of easing tensions with China and weakening India's growing military buildup as well. Relations then hit an all-time low under the Nixon administration in the early 1970s. Nixon shifted away from the neutral stance which his predecessors had taken towards India-Pakistan hostilities. He established a very close relationship with Pakistan, aiding it militarily and economically, as India, now under the leadership of Indira Gandhi, was leaning towards Soviet Union. He considered Pakistan as a very important ally to counter Soviet influence in the Indian subcontinent and establish ties with China, with whom Pakistan was very close. During the 1971 Indo-Pakistani War, the US openly supported Pakistan and deployed its aircraft carrier USS Enterprise towards the Bay of Bengal, which was seen as a show of force by the US in support of the West Pakistani forces. Later in 1974, India conducted its first nuclear test, Smiling Buddha, which was opposed by the US, however it also concluded that the test did not violate any agreement.

In the late 1970s, with the Janata Party leader Morarji Desai becoming the prime minister, India improved its relations with the US, led by Jimmy Carter, despite the latter signing an order in 1978 barring nuclear material from being exported to India due to India's non-proliferation record.

Despite the return of Indira Gandhi to power in 1980, the relations between the two countries continued to improve gradually, although India did not support the United States in its role in the Soviet invasion and occupation of Afghanistan. Indian Foreign Minister P. V. Narasimha Rao expressed "grave concern" over the United States's decision to "rearm" Pakistan; the two countries were working closely together to counter the Soviets in Afghanistan. The Reagan administration provided limited assistance to India. India sounded out Washington on the purchase of a range of US defence technology. In 1984, Washington approved the supply of selected technology to India, including gas turbines for naval frigates and engines for prototypes for India's light combat aircraft. There were also unpublicized transfers of technology, including the engagement of a US company, Continental Electronics, to design and build a new VLF communications station, which was commissioned in the late 1980s.

== Contemporary relations ==
=== Post-liberalization era ===
Under Bill Clinton (President 1993–2001) and P. V. Narasimha Rao (Prime Minister 1991–1996) both sides mishandled relations, according to Arthur G. Rubinoff. Clinton simultaneously pressured India to liberalize its economy while criticizing New Delhi on human rights and nuclear issues. In the face of criticism from Washington and opposition at home, Indian leaders lost their enthusiasm for rapprochement and reverted to formalistic protocol over substantive diplomacy. The Brown Amendment that restored American aid to Pakistan in 1995 was an irritant. In returning to a Cold War style rhetoric, Indian parliamentarians and American congressmen demonstrated their unwillingness to establish a new relationship.

=== NDA I and II governments (1998–2004) ===
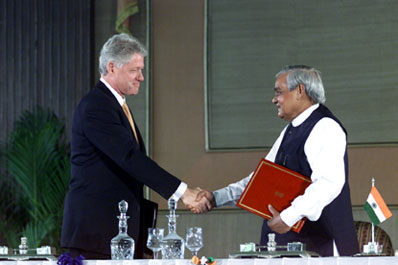
Indian Prime Minister Atal Bihari Vajpayee with US President Bill Clinton in New Delhi in March 2000

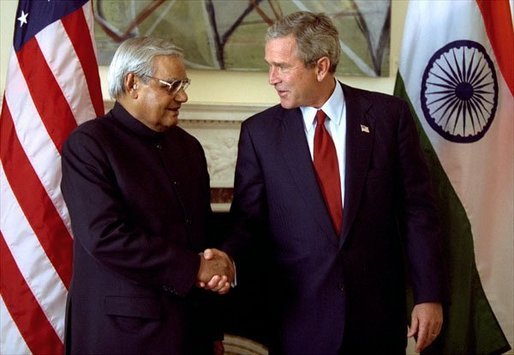
Indian Prime Minister Atal Bihari Vajpayee with US President George W. Bush in New York City in September 2003

Soon after Atal Bihari Vajpayee became Indian prime minister, he authorized nuclear weapons testing at Pokhran. The United States strongly condemned this testing, promised sanctions, and voted in favor of a United Nations Security Council resolution condemning the tests. President Clinton imposed economic sanctions on India, including cutting off all military and economic aid; freezing loans by American banks to state-owned Indian companies; prohibiting loans to the Indian government for all except food purchases; prohibiting American aerospace technology and uranium exports to India; and requiring the US to oppose all loan requests by India to international lending agencies. However, these sanctions proved ineffective—India was experiencing strong economic growth, and its trade with the US only constituted a small portion of its GDP. Only Japan joined the US in imposing direct sanctions, while most other nations continued to trade with India. The sanctions were soon lifted. Afterward, the Clinton administration and Prime Minister Vajpayee exchanged representatives to help rebuild relations. In March 2000, Clinton visited India, undertaking bilateral and economic discussions with Vajpayee. This would mark the first US presidential trip to India since 1978. During the visit, the Indo-US Science & Technology Forum was established.

Over the course of improved diplomatic relations with the Bush administration, India agreed to allow close international monitoring of its nuclear weapons development, although it refused to give up its current nuclear arsenal. In 2004, the US decided to grant major non-NATO ally (MNNA) status to Pakistan. The US extended the MNNA strategic working relationship to India but the offer was turned down. After the September 11 attacks against the US in 2001, President George W. Bush collaborated closely with India in controlling and policing the strategically critical Indian Ocean sea lanes from the Suez Canal to Singapore.

=== UPA I and II governments (2004–2014) ===
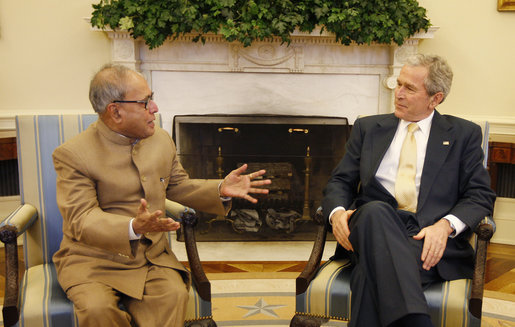
Indian Minister of External Affairs Pranab Mukherjee in the Oval Office with US President George W. Bush in March 2008

During the George W. Bush administration, relations between India and the United States improved greatly, primarily over common concerns regarding growing Islamic extremism, energy security, and climate change. George W. Bush commented: "India is a great example of democracy. It is very devout, has diverse religious heads, but everyone is comfortable about their religion. The world needs India". Journalist Fareed Zakaria, in his book The Post-American World, described Bush as "being the most pro-Indian president in American history." According to Rejaul Karim Laskar, a scholar of Indian foreign policy and ideologue of the Indian National Congress, the ruling UPA coalition saw a "transformation in bilateral ties with the US", as a result of which the relations now covers "a wide range of issues, including high technology, space, education, agriculture, trade, clean energy, counter- terrorism, etc".

After the December 2004 tsunami, the US and Indian navies cooperated in search and rescue operations and in the reconstruction of affected areas. Since 2004, Washington and New Delhi pursued a "strategic partnership" based on shared values and generally convergent geopolitical interests. Numerous economic, security, and global initiatives, including plans for civilian nuclear cooperation, are underway. First launched in 2005, cooperation on nuclear weapons reversed three decades of American non-proliferation policy. Also in 2005, United States and India signed a ten-year defense framework agreement, with the goal of expanding bilateral security cooperation. The two countries engaged in numerous and unprecedented combined military exercises, and major US arms sales to India were concluded. After Hurricane Katrina, India donated $5 million to the American Red Cross and sent two planeloads of relief supplies and materials to help. The value of all bilateral trade tripled from 2004 to 2008 and continued to grow, while two-way investment also increased. In November 2010, President Barack Obama visited India and addressed a joint session of the Indian Parliament, where he backed India's bid for a permanent seat on the United Nations Security Council.

==== Strategic and military determinants ====
In March 2009, the Obama administration cleared the US$2.1 billion sale of eight P-8 Poseidons to India. This deal, and the $5 billion agreement to provide Boeing C-17 military transport aircraft and General Electric F414 engines announced during Obama's November 2010 visit, made the US one of the top three military suppliers to India (after Israel and Russia).

==== US spying incidents ====
In July and November 2013, India demanded that the US respond to allegations that the Indian UN mission in New York City and the Indian Embassy in Washington, D.C. had been targeted for spying. A 2010 document leaked by Edward Snowden and published by The Washington Post revealed that US intelligence agencies had been authorized to spy on Narendra Modi (who was then the Chief Minister of the Indian state of Gujarat).

WikiLeaks revelations that Western intelligence agencies used foreign aid workers and staff at non-governmental organizations as non-official cover prompted India to increase monitoring of satellite phones and movement of personnel working for humanitarian relief organizations and development aid agencies in the vicinity of sensitive locations.

==== Foreign policy issues during the early 2010s ====
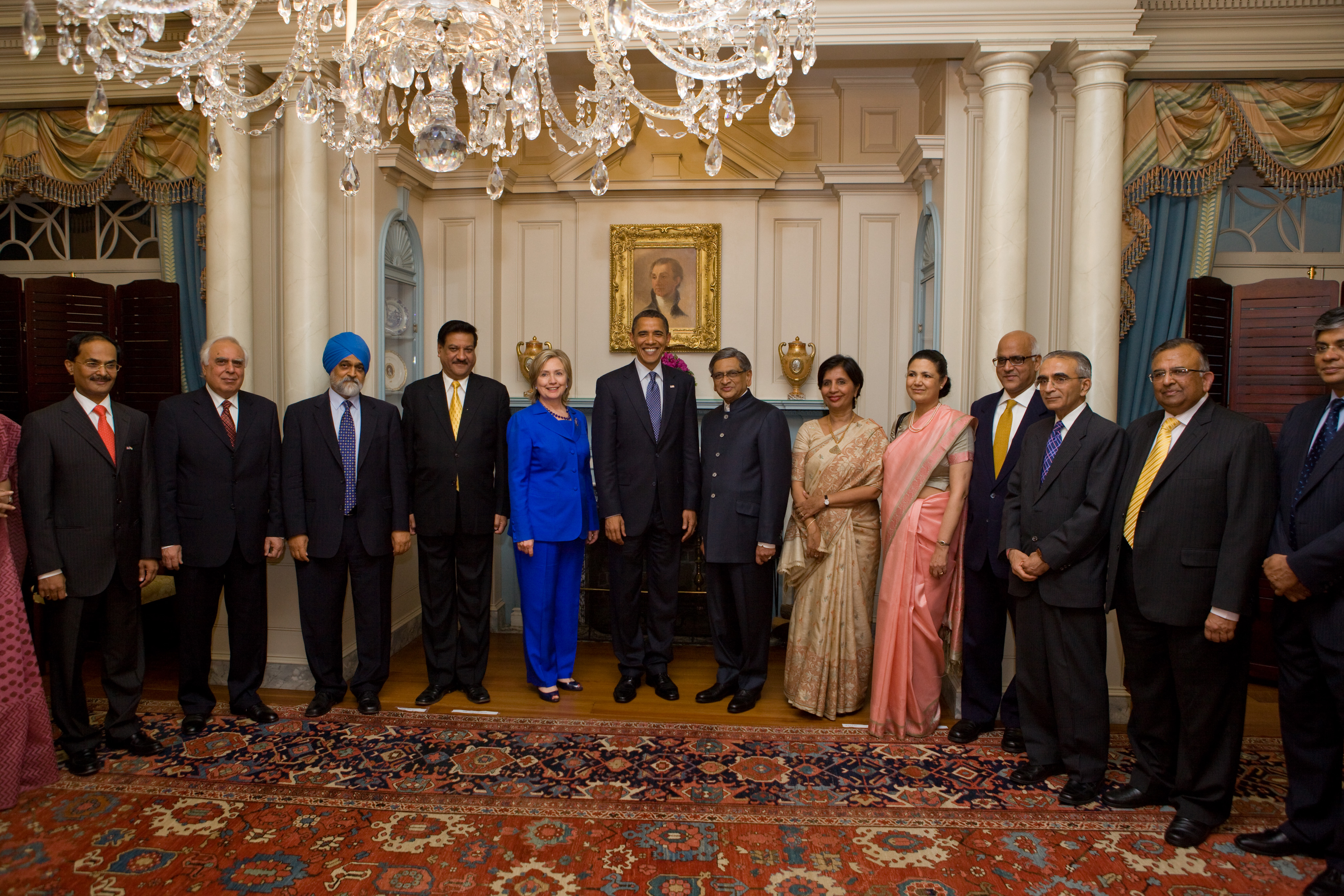
President Barack Obama, US Secretary of State Hillary Clinton, and the Indian delegation at the US-India Strategic Dialogue reception at the US Department of State in Washington, D.C. in June 2010

According to some analysts, India–US relations were strained over the approach of the Obama administration to Pakistan and the handling of the Taliban insurgency in Afghanistan. India's National Security Adviser M. K. Narayanan criticized the Obama administration for linking the Kashmir dispute to the instability in Pakistan and Afghanistan, and said that by doing so, President Obama was "barking up the wrong tree." Foreign Policy in February 2009 also criticized Obama's approach to South Asia, saying that "India can be a part of the solution rather than part of the problem" in South Asia. It suggested that India take a more proactive role in rebuilding Afghanistan, irrespective of the attitude of the Obama administration. Bloomberg reported that, since the 2008 Mumbai attacks, the public mood in India has been to pressure Pakistan more aggressively to take actions against the culprits behind the terrorist attack, and predicted that this might be reflected in the Indian general elections in May 2009. Consequently, the Obama administration may have found itself at odds with India's rigid stance against terrorism.

In the early 2010s, India and US governments have differed on a variety of regional issues ranging from America's military relations with Pakistan and India's military relations with Russia to foreign policy disagreements relating to Iran, Sri Lanka, Maldives, Myanmar and Bangladesh.

India criticized the Obama administration's decision to limit H-1B (temporary) visas, and India's then External Affairs Minister Pranab Mukherjee (later, the president of India until 2017) said that India would oppose US "protectionism" at various international forums. India's Commerce Minister Kamal Nath said that India may move against Obama's outsourcing policies at the World Trade Organization. In May 2009, Obama reiterated his anti-outsourcing views and criticized the current US tax policy "that says you should pay lower taxes if you create a job in Bangalore, India, than if you create one in Buffalo, New York." However, during the US India Business Council meeting in June 2009, US Secretary of State Hillary Clinton advocated for stronger economic ties between India and the United States.

In June 2010, the United States and India formally re-engaged the US-India Strategic Dialogue initiated under President Bush when a large delegation of high-ranking Indian officials, led by External Affairs Minister S. M. Krishna, visited Washington, D.C. As leader of the US delegation, Secretary of State Clinton lauded India as "an indispensable partner and a trusted friend". President Obama appeared briefly at a United States Department of State reception to declare his firm belief that America's relationship with India "will be one of the defining partnerships of the 21st century." The Strategic Dialogue produced a joint statement in which the two countries pledged to "deepen people-to-people, business-to-business, and government-to-government linkages ... for the mutual benefit of both countries and for the promotion of global peace, stability, economic growth and prosperity." It outlined extensive bilateral initiatives in ten key areas, covering a wide range of security-related, economic, and societal topics.

In November 2010, Obama became the second US president (after Richard Nixon in 1969) to undertake a visit to India in his first term in office. On November 8, Obama also became the second US president (after Dwight D. Eisenhower in 1959) to ever address a joint session of the Parliament of India. In a major policy shift, Obama declared US support for India's permanent membership on the UN Security Council. He also announced the removal of export control restrictions on several Indian companies, and concluded trade deals worth $10 billion, which are expected to create and/or support 50,000 jobs in the US.

==== Devyani Khobragade incident ====
In December 2013, Devyani Khobragade, the Deputy Consul General of India in New York, was arrested and accused by US federal prosecutors of submitting false work visa documents and paying her housekeeper "far less than the minimum legal wage." The ensuing incident saw protests from the Indian government and a rift in relations, with outrage expressed that Khobragade was strip-searched and held in the general inmate population. Former Prime Minister Manmohan Singh said that Khobragade's treatment was "deplorable".

India demanded an apology from the US over her alleged "humiliation" and called for the charges to be dropped, which the US declined to do. The Indian government retaliated for what it viewed as the mistreatment of its consular official by revoking the ID cards and other privileges of US consular personnel and their families in India and removing security barriers in front of the US Embassy in New Delhi. Nancy J. Powell, the US ambassador to India, resigned following the incident, which was widely seen by India "as fallout from the imbroglio." Within a year of the incident, US–India relations were warming again, as President Obama visited India in January 2015.

=== Modi government (2014–present) ===
==== Modi–Obama relationship (2014–2017) ====
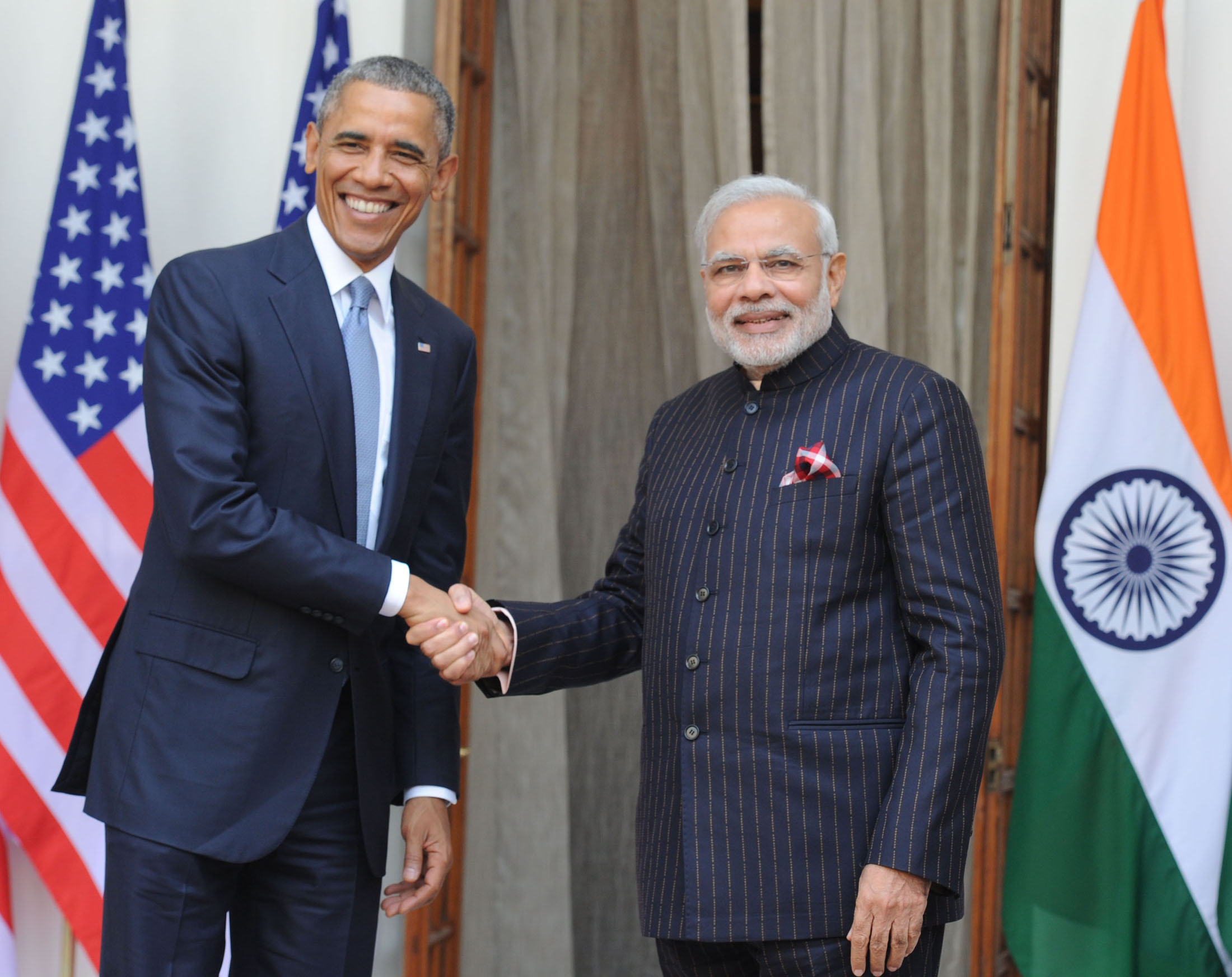
Indian Prime Minister Narendra Modi with US President Barack Obama in New Delhi, January 2015.

By 2016, India–United States relations improved significantly during the Premiership of Narendra Modi which began in 2014. India and the US share an extensive and expanding cultural, strategic, military, and economic relationship which is in the phase of implementing confidence building measures (CBM) to overcome the legacy of trust deficit—brought about by adversarial US foreign policies and multiple instances of technology denial—which have plagued the relationship over several decades.

Key developments included the rapid growth of India's economy; closer ties between the Indian and American industries, especially in the Information and communications technology (ICT), engineering and medical sectors; an informal entente to manage an increasingly assertive China; robust cooperation on counter-terrorism; the deterioration of US-Pakistan relations; easing of export controls over dual-use goods & technologies (99% of licenses applied were, as of 2016, approved); and reversal of long-standing American opposition to India's strategic program.

Income creation in the US through knowledge-based employment by Asian Indians has outpaced every other ethnic group according to US Census data. Growing financial and political clout of the affluent Asian Indian diaspora is noteworthy. Indian American households are the most prosperous in the US, with a median revenue of US$100,000, and are followed by Chinese Americans at US$65,000. The average household revenue in the USA is US$63,000. The political influence of the large Indian-American community is reflected in the largest country-specific caucus in the United States Congress, while between 2009 and 2010 more than 100,000 Indian students attended American colleges and universities.

The 2014 State Department's annual Trafficking in Persons (TIP) report appeared to classify the Khobragade incident as an example of human trafficking, stating: "An Indian consular officer at the New York consulate was indicted in December 2013 for visa fraud related to her alleged exploitation of an Indian domestic worker." In response, India showed no urgency to allow visits to India by the newly appointed US anti-human trafficking ambassador Susan P. Coppedge and the US special envoy for LGBT rights Randy Berry. Under Section 377 of the Indian Penal Code homosexuality was illegal in India. Indian Ambassador to the US, Arun K. Singh reiterated India's commitment to work within an international framework to tackle the problem of trafficking but rejected any "unilateral assessments" by another country saying "We will never accept it" and downplayed the importance of the visits: "When you ask a US official when somebody will be given a visa, they always say 'we will assess when visa is applied for.' ... I can do no better than to reiterate the US position."

In February 2016, the Obama administration notified the US Congress that it intended to provide Pakistan eight nuclear-capable F-16 fighters and assorted military goods, including eight AN/APG-68(V)9 airborne radars and eight ALQ-211(V)9 electronic warfare suites, despite strong reservations from US lawmakers regarding the transfer of any nuclear-capable platforms to Pakistan. The Indian Government summoned the US Ambassador to India to convey its disapproval regarding the sale of F-16 fighter jets to Pakistan.

==== Modi–Trump relationship (2017–2021) ====
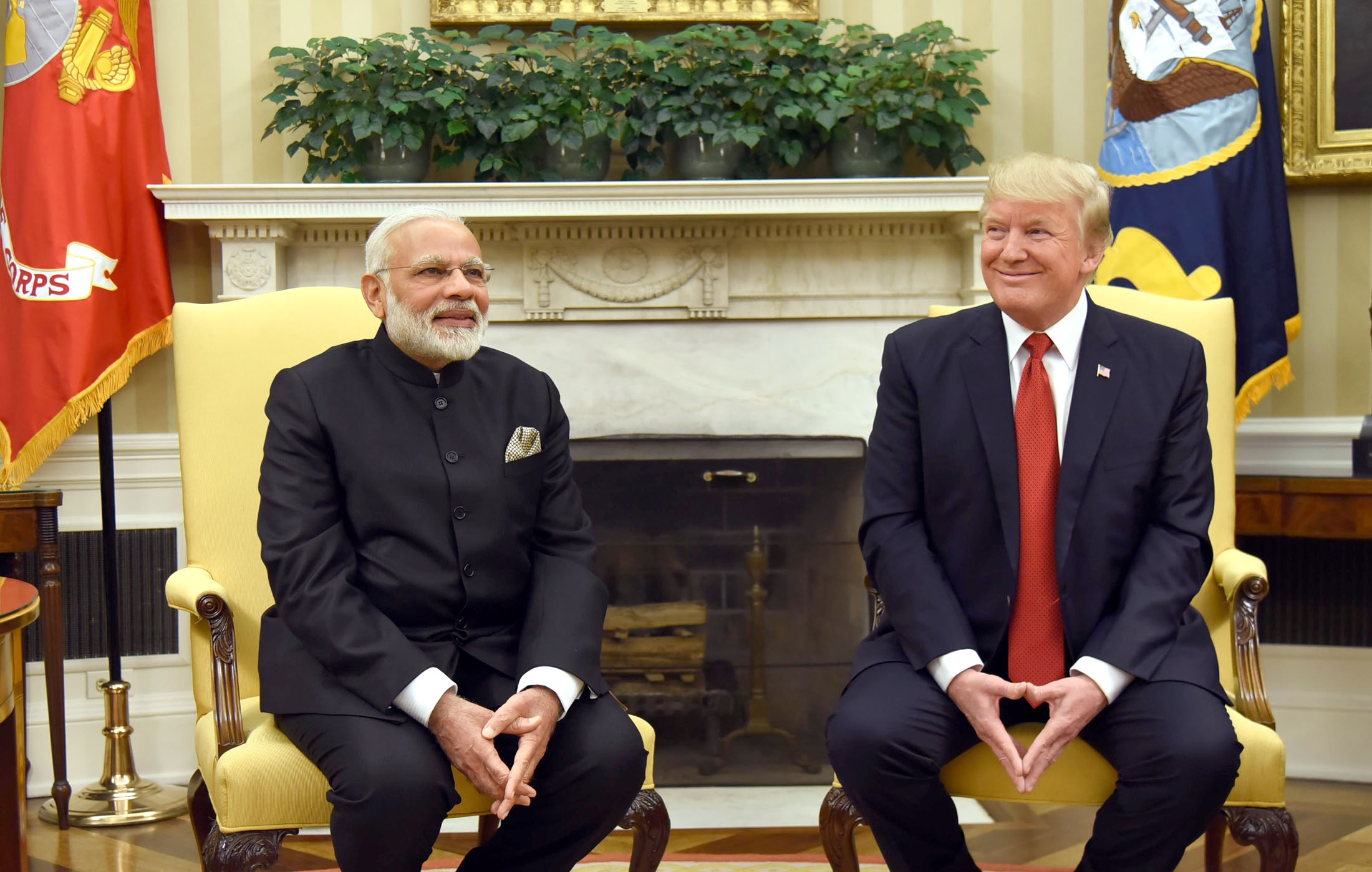
Indian Prime Minister Narendra Modi with US President Donald Trump in the Oval Office, June 2017

In February 2017, Indian ambassador to the US Navtej Sarna hosted a reception for the National Governors Association (NGA), which was attended by the governors of 25 states and senior representatives of three more states. This was the first time such an event had occurred. Explaining the reason for the gathering, Virginia Governor and NGA Chair Terry McAuliffe stated that "We clearly understand the strategic importance of India, of India–US relations. As we grow our 21st century economy, India has been so instrumental in helping us build our technology, medical professions. We recognise a country that has been such a close strategic ally of the US. That's why we the Governors are here tonight."

In October 2018, India inked a historic agreement worth US$5.43 billion with Russia to procure four S-400 Triumf surface-to-air missile defence systems—one of the most powerful missile defence systems in the world—ignoring America's CAATSA act. The US threatened India with sanctions over India's decision to buy the S-400 missile defense system from Russia. The US also threatened India with sanctions over India's decision to buy oil from Iran. However, the Trump administration avoided sanctioning India for the Russian S-400 missile system, while sanctioning Turkey and China for the same purchases.

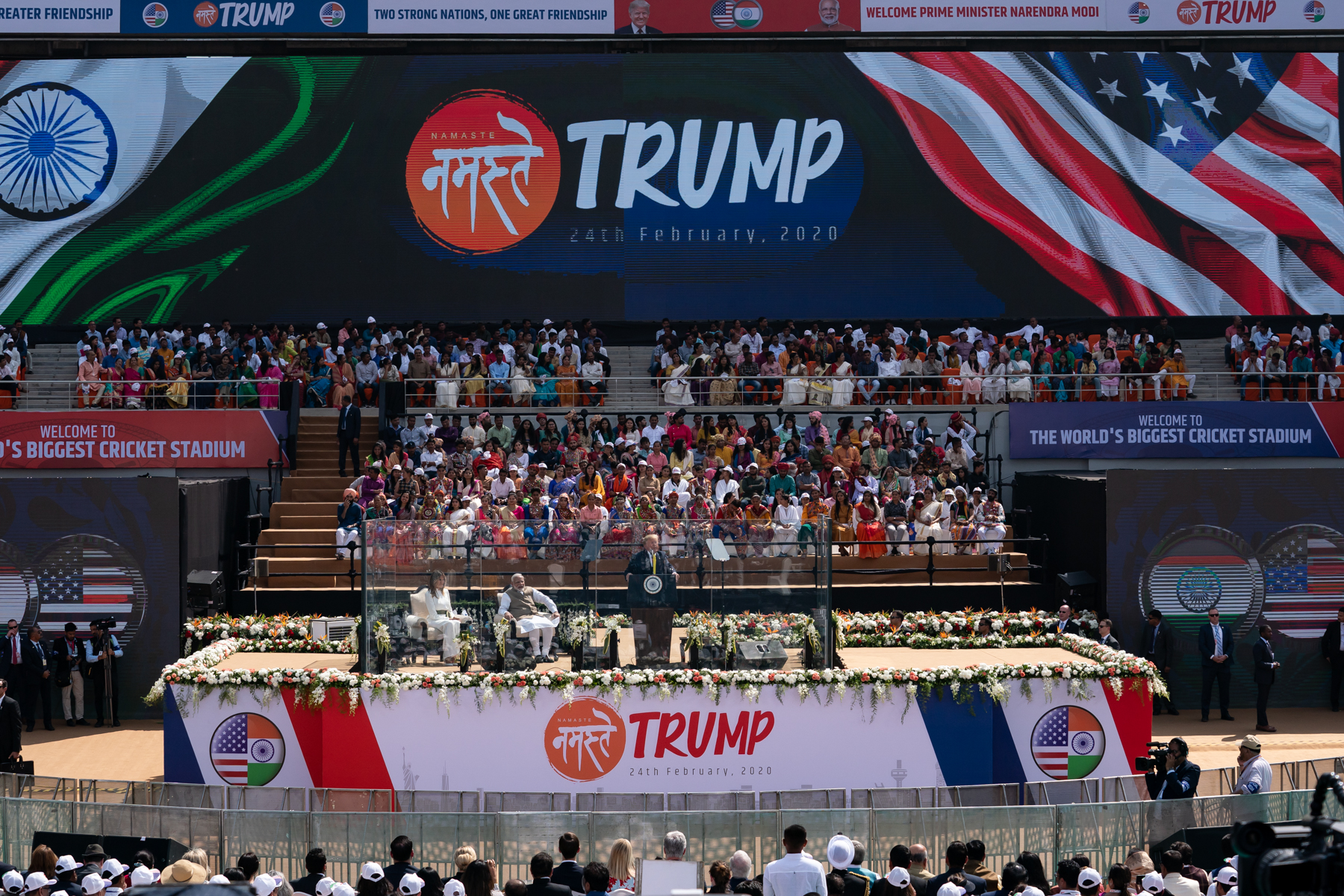
President Donald Trump and Indian Prime Minister Narendra Modi at Namaste Trump rally in Ahmedabad, India on February 24, 2020

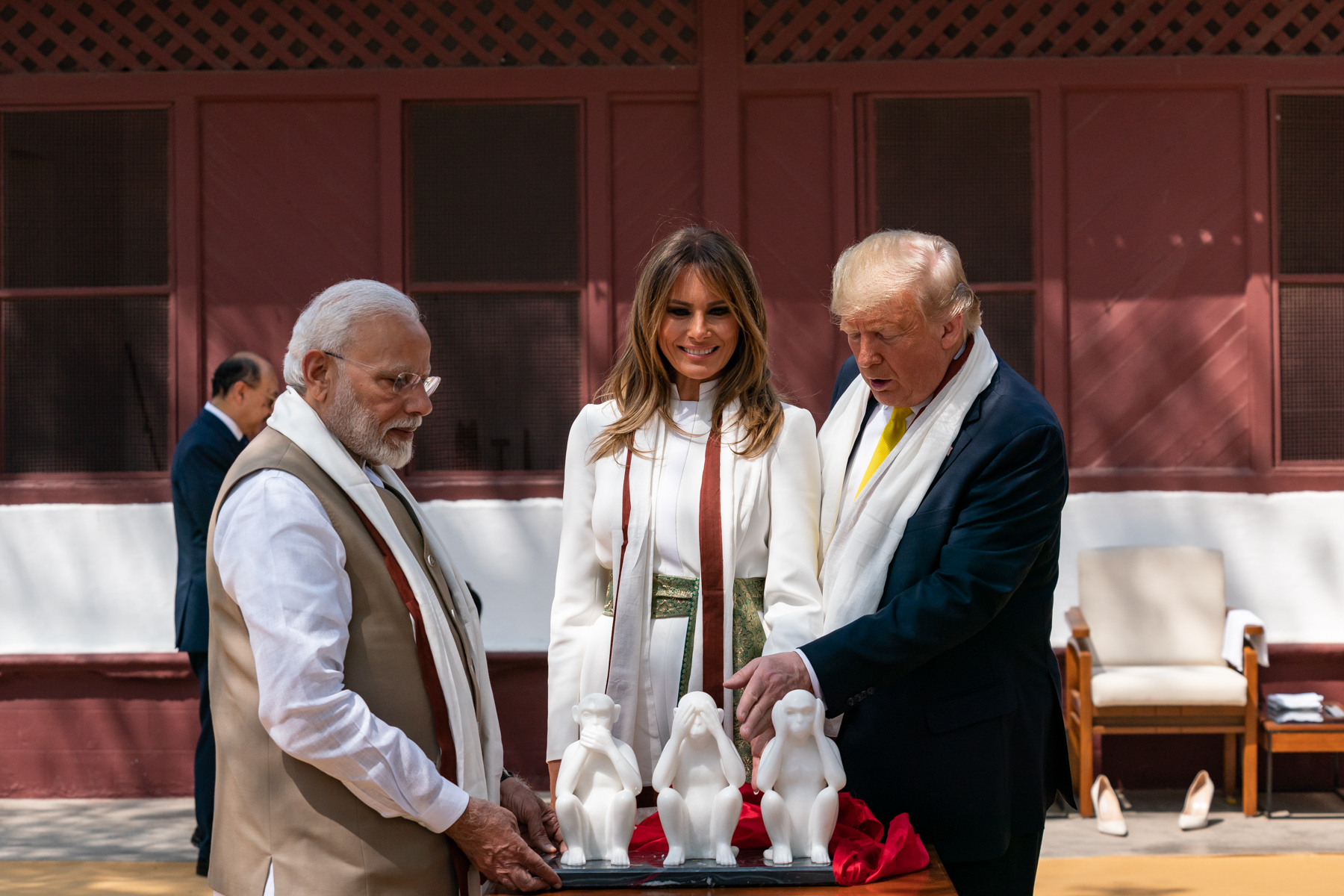
PM Modi gifts exemplar of Mahatma Gandhi's three wise monkeys to President Trump

President Donald Trump grew closer to India's BJP government, which shared similar right-wing views. He repeatedly praised Modi's leadership and avoided any negative criticism of the Indian government's actions on the citizenship and Kashmir disputes. The Trump administration was consistent with the Modi administration in combating "radical Islamic terrorism", and the US reiterated its support for India's elimination of terrorist training camp in Pakistan.

In early 2020, India provided its agreement for terminating an export embargo on a medicinal drug known as hydroxychloroquine amidst the combat against the ongoing coronavirus (COVID-19) pandemic, after Trump threatened retaliation against India if it did not comply with terminating the export embargo on hydroxychloroquine.

On December 21, 2020, President Trump awarded Modi with the Legion of Merit for elevating India–United States relations. The Legion of Merit was awarded to Modi along with Prime Minister of Australia Scott Morrison and former Prime Minister of Japan Shinzo Abe, the "original architects" of the QUAD.

==== Modi–Biden relationship (2021–2025) ====
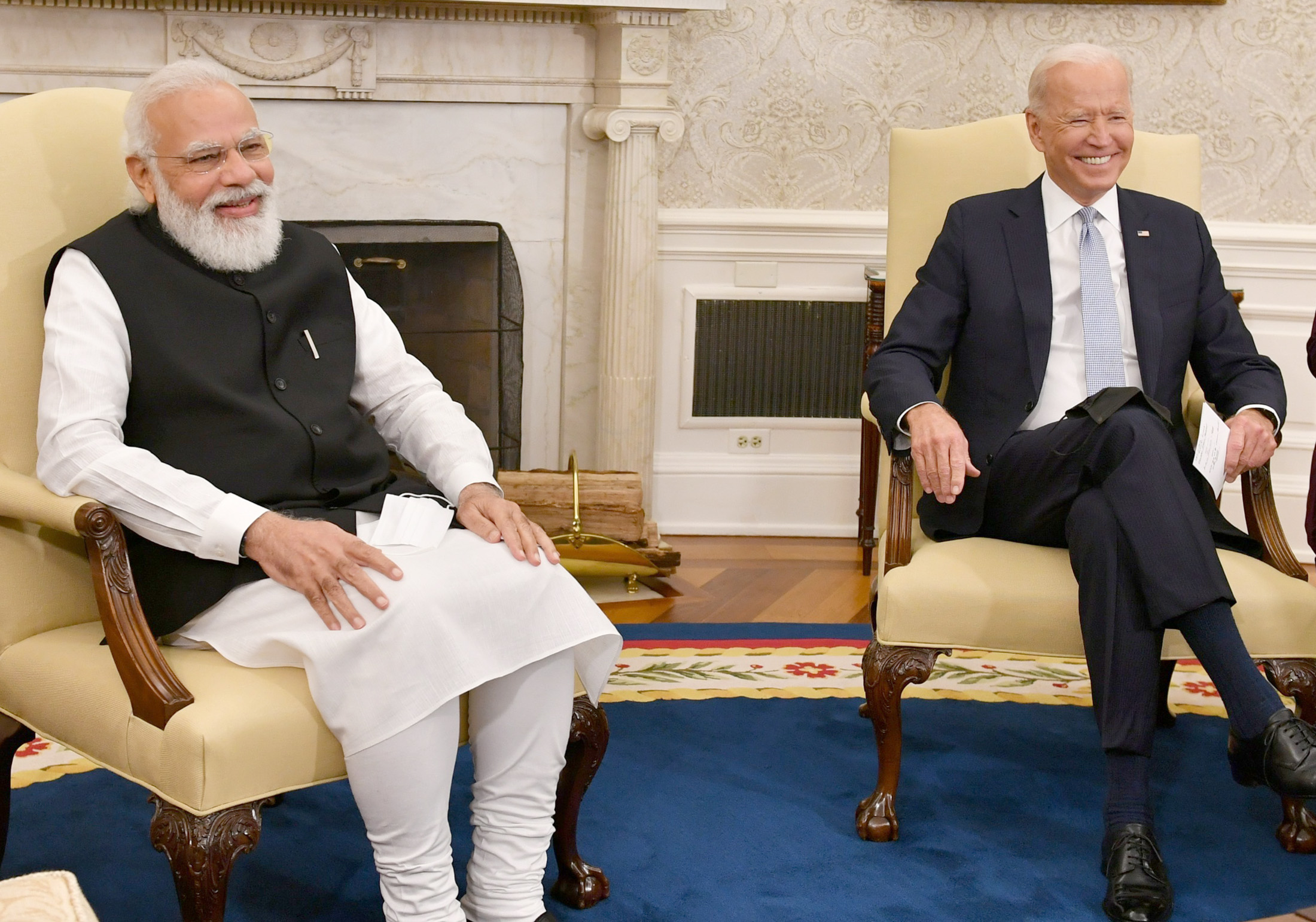
Indian Prime Minister Narendra Modi with US President Joe Biden in the Oval Office, September 2021

US–India ties began to strain in April 2021 when India faced a massive spike in COVID-19 infections. The US had invoked the Defense Production Act of 1950 to ban the export of raw materials needed to produce vaccines in order to prioritize domestic vaccine production. According to The Times of India, this also caused an explosion of anti-US sentiment in India, as the US had vaccine reserves and refused to share COVID-19 vaccine patents. This came after a plea by Adar Poonawalla, CEO of the Serum Institute of India, to lift the embargo on export of raw materials needed to ramp up production of COVID-19 vaccines, was rejected. However, in late April, right after a phone call with Ajit Doval, the National Security Advisor of India, the Biden administration stated it would make raw materials necessary for production of the Oxford–AstraZeneca COVID-19 vaccine available to India, and began to send more than ₹714 crore (equivalent to ₹874 crore or US$91 million in 2026) worth of drug treatments, rapid diagnostic tests, ventilators, personal protective equipment, and mechanical parts needed to manufacture vaccines to India, along with a team of public health experts from the United States Centers for Disease Control and Prevention. The US also stated that it planned to finance the expansion of Biological E. Limited, an Indian-based COVID-19 vaccine production company. India entered negotiations with the US after it declared that it would share 60 million Oxford-AstraZeneca vaccines with the world.

In a meeting of the Quadrilateral Security Dialogue on the implications of the 2022 Russian invasion of Ukraine for the region, President Biden noted India's abstention on a UN resolution condemning the invasion, saying that most global allies were united against Russia. Speaking to the US Senate Foreign Relations Committee, US diplomat Donald Lu said the Biden administration was still considering sanctions against India over its S-400 deal with Russia and its abstention at the UN. However, the Biden administration ruled out secondary sanctions against India for its considerable oil imports or defence engagement from Russia.

===== Strengthen cooperation in various fields =====
Although there are certain differences over the Russian invasion of Ukraine, the United States and India strengthened cooperation in defense, semiconductors, critical minerals, space, climate, education, healthcare and other fields during the Joe Biden presidency. Biden called the ties with India "one of the defining relationships of the 21st century". In a joint statement in 2023, Modi and Biden reiterated the call for concerted action against all groups identified by the United Nations as terrorist organisations, including Al-Qaeda, ISIS (Daesh), Lashkar-e-Tayyiba (LeT), Jaish-e-Mohammad (JeM) and Hizb-ul-Mujhahideen (HuM). They also called out the Afghan Taliban authorities and Pakistan on the issue of terrorism. The joint statement declared that the two countries have strong ties spanning "seas to stars". A senior fellow of the Atlantic Council citing complementary partnerships between the two nations suggested for deepening health systems cooperation.

===== Spying allegations against India =====
In November 2023, it was reported that US authorities prevented a plot to assassinate Gurpatwant Singh Pannun, a Sikh separatist leader of the Khalistan movement, within American borders. Pannun had made threats to bomb the Indian Parliament and Air India flights, is now facing charges related to terrorist activities by India's NIA. United States federal prosecutors filed charges against Nikhil Gupta, an Indian national, alleging his involvement in a conspiracy with an Indian government official to carry out the assassination of Pannun. India voiced apprehension over the connection of one of its government officials to the plot, distancing itself from the incident and saying it contradicted government policy. In December 2023, it was reported that President Joe Biden cancelled plans to attend India's January 2024 Delhi Republic Day parade.

==== Modi–Trump relationship (2025–present) ====
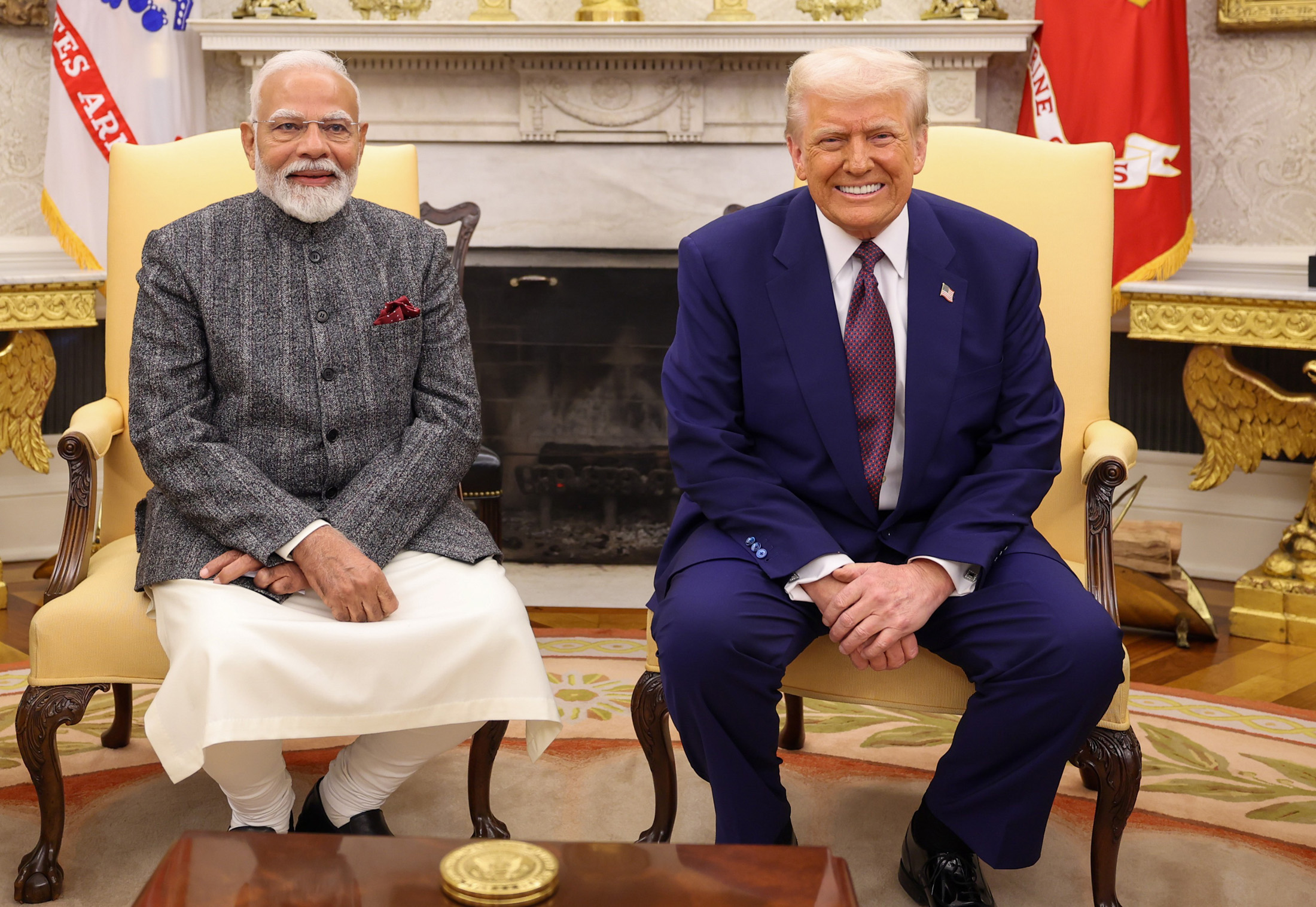
Indian Prime Minister Narendra Modi with US President Donald Trump in the Oval Office, February 2025

India rejected Trump's offer to mediate India-China tensions. In May, again, India rejected Trump's and his vice president's offer to mediate when the 2025 India–Pakistan conflict unfolded. The Indian Prime Minister first conveyed this directly to Trump in June. In late July, Modi reiterated the point during a parliamentary debate.

On February 13, 2025, Indian Prime Minister Narendra Modi became the fourth world leader to visit Donald Trump at the White House. During the meeting, Modi praised the MAGA movement.

===== Pahalgam attack and Indo-Pak ceasefire =====
Following the 2025 Pahalgam attack, the United States initially expressed support for India’s right to respond. President Donald Trump condemned the attack and offered condolences, while US officials reiterated India’s sovereignty in handling its security challenges. However, bilateral tensions emerged in the weeks that followed—particularly over conflicting claims regarding the May ceasefire with Pakistan—after India's announcement of halting Operation Sindoor. While the Trump administration and several US media reports credited American diplomacy for facilitating the truce, Indian officials rejected these assertions.

On July 30, 2025, President Trump announced 25% tariffs on India in addition to a penalty due to India's purchase of military equipment from Russia. The move was widely interpreted in Indian media as a response to New Delhi’s consistent emphasis on strategic autonomy and its rejection of third-party mediation. In the weeks that followed, a perceptible shift was noted in President Trump's public statements regarding South Asia. While earlier expressions had focused on supporting India’s counterterrorism efforts, subsequent remarks increasingly highlighted the role of US diplomacy in facilitating the India–Pakistan ceasefire. In public addresses, including a White House briefing and a campaign rally in July, President Trump asserted that American engagement had helped de-escalate the conflict and suggested such efforts merited international recognition.

These claims were formally denied by Indian officials. Minister of External Affairs S. Jaishankar stated in Parliament that no calls or contact occurred between the Indian and US leadership during the period in question and that the ceasefire had been initiated through bilateral military dialogue. Several Indian media outlets noted a correlation between the timing of the US tariff announcement and the increased emphasis in Washington on American diplomatic efforts in South Asia. Commentators in both countries described the developments as indicative of growing friction over differing narratives regarding the ceasefire and broader regional dynamics.

===== Tariff and energy dispute over Russia and Pakistan =====
In July 2025, President Trump criticized India for continuing oil trade with Russia despite ongoing Western sanctions. Earlier in July, US Senator Lindsey Graham introduced a sanctions bill proposing tariffs of up to 500% on countries—including India—that continued to trade oil with Russia. Towards the end of July, Trump announced a 25% "reciprocal tariff" on Indian goods and additional 25% penalties linked to India's purchase of Russian arms and energy, taking total tariffs to around 50%. Trump also revealed a proposed trade and energy development agreement with Pakistan. According to his Truth Social post, the United States would support the exploration and extraction of Pakistan's "massive" oil reserves through American firms, although the specifics of the deal remained unclear. However, geoscientist Moin Raza Khan, former managing director of Pakistan Petroleum Limited, disputed these claims, stating that Trump’s assertions about Pakistan’s vast oil reserves did not reflect reality. Khan emphasized the lack of reliable data. Similarly, GA Sabri, a former Pakistani federal petroleum official, dismissed the claims as a "political gimmick." Trump also took a swipe at the Indian economy, describing it as "dead" in the context of stalled negotiations over dairy and agricultural market access. According to American investment bank Jefferies, the unusually high tariffs were largely driven by former President Donald Trump's personal dissatisfaction after India declined his offer to mediate in its conflict with Pakistan, which may have hindered his efforts to position himself as a peace broker and Nobel Peace Prize candidate.

In September 2025, a thaw in bilateral relations was observed when U.S. President Donald Trump made a phone call to Indian Prime Minister Narendra Modi to extend birthday greetings. Following the call, Trump posted on X, commending Modi for doing a "tremendous job" and expressing gratitude for his support toward efforts aimed at ending the Russia–Ukraine conflict.

U.S. President Donald Trump said on 14 January 2026 that countries that do business with Iran will face a new 25% tariff. This includes India which imports 8% of Iran's goods to as of 2023.

In February 2026, U.S. President Donald Trump announced a trade agreement with India that would lower U.S. tariffs on Indian goods to approximately 18 percent. The deal was linked to India’s reported agreement to stop purchasing Russian oil, aiming to reduce Moscow’s energy revenues amid the ongoing conflict in Ukraine.

== Military relations ==
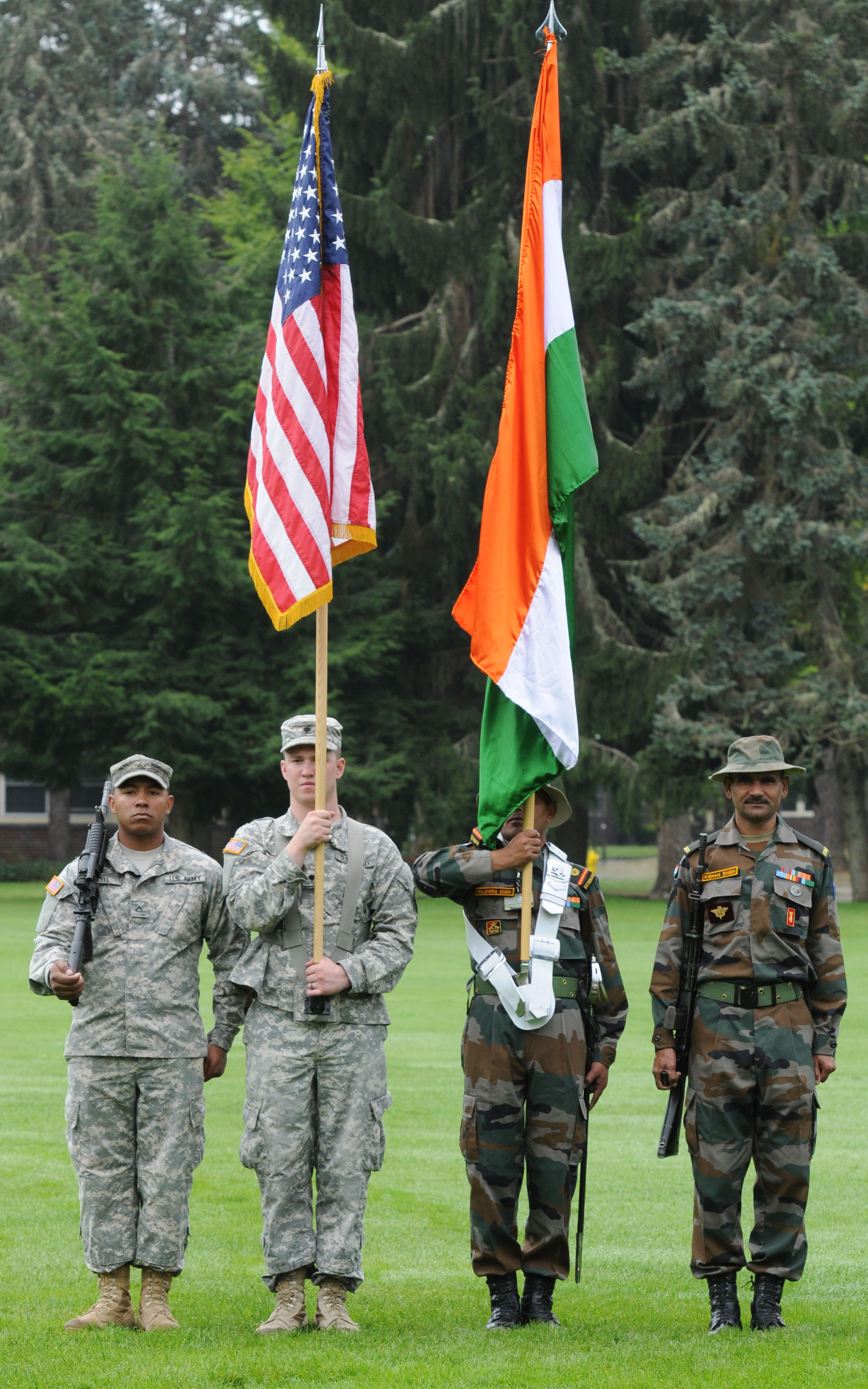
U.S. and Indian Army soldiers during the opening ceremony of Yudh Abhyas at Joint Base Lewis–McChord in Tacoma, Washington in September 2015

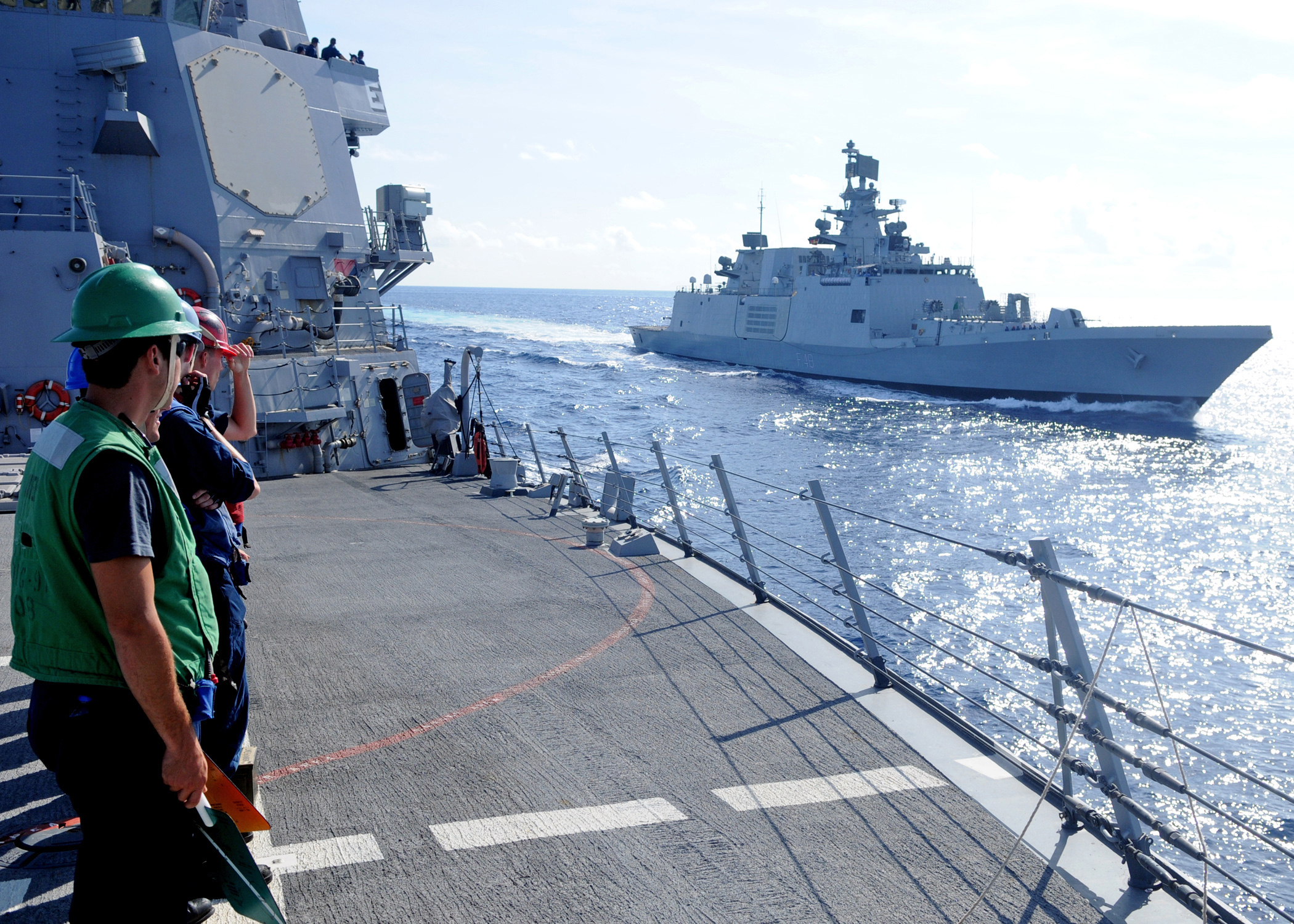
Sailors assigned to the guided-missile destroyer USS Halsey stand in ranks as the Indian Navy frigate INS Satpura pulls alongside during a Malabar naval exercise in April 2012

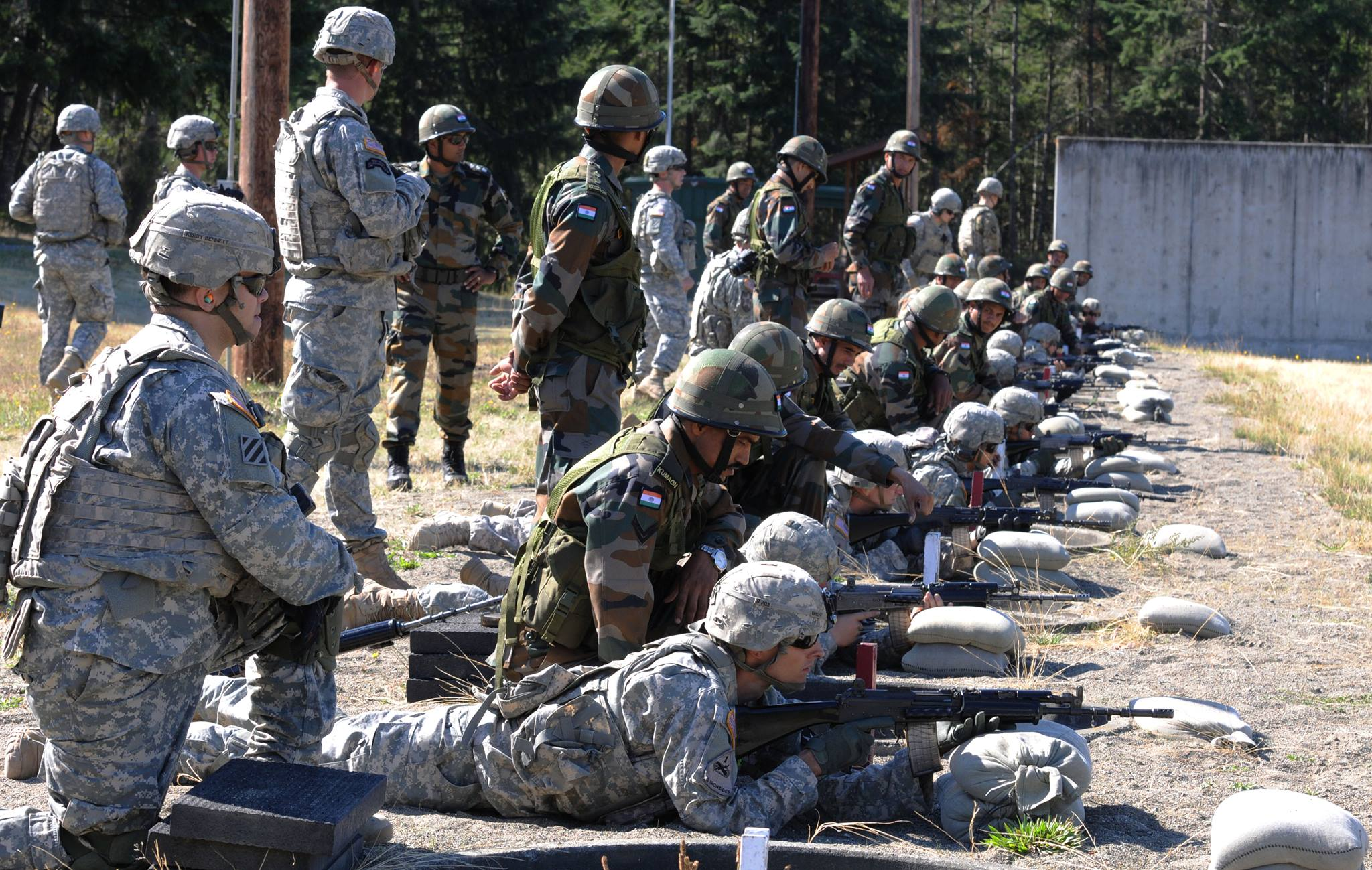
U.S. soldiers of the 3rd Infantry Brigade, 2nd Infantry Division and Indian Army soldiers of the 6th Battalion of the Kumaon Regiment, fire each other's weapons during Yudh Abhyas in September 2015

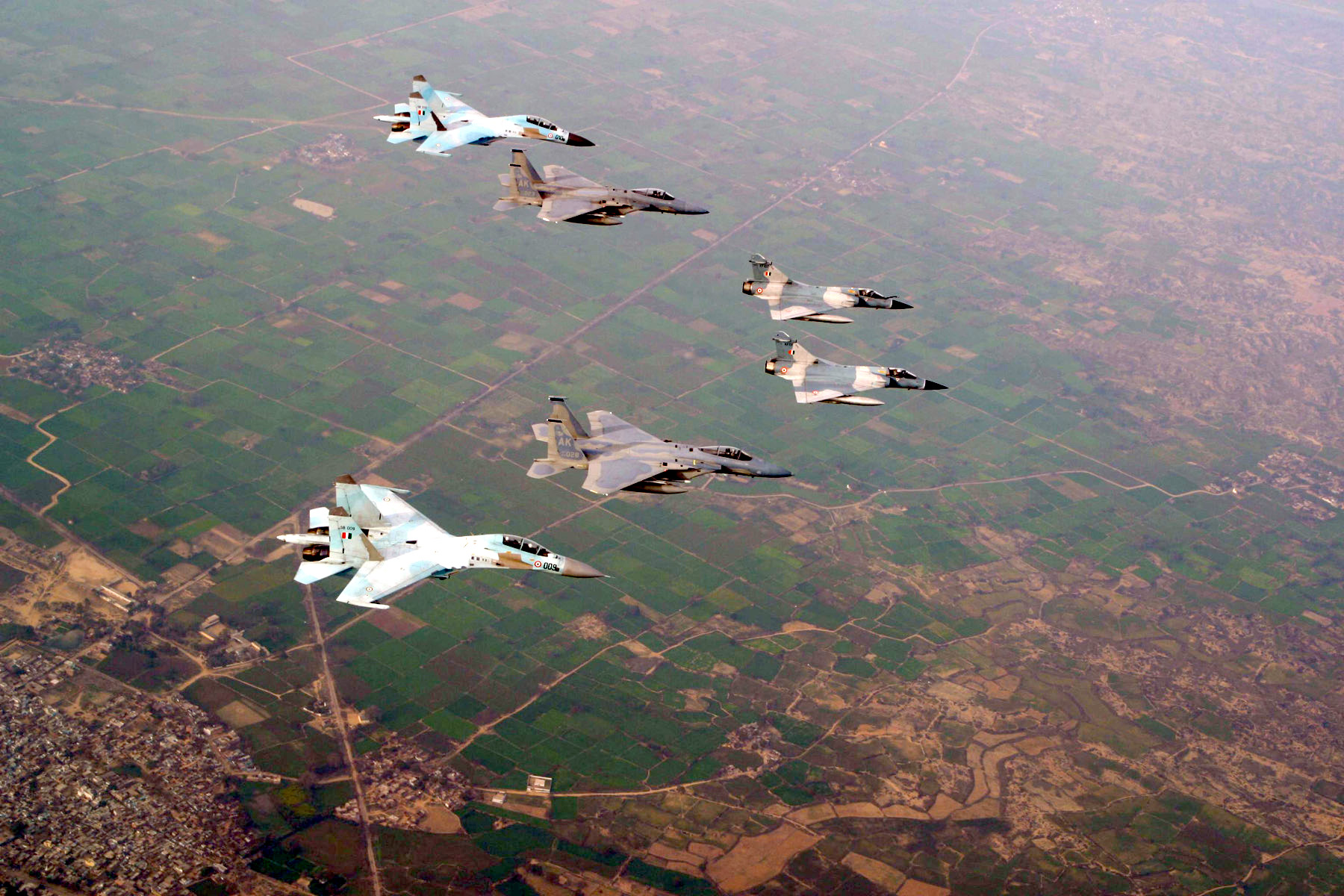
USAF F-15C Eagles (middle of V formation) from Elmendorf Air Force Base in Alaska fly with IAF SU-30MKI Flankers (rear) and Mirage 2000 aircraft over the Indian landscape during Cope India in 2004, the first bilateral fighter exercise between the two air forces in more than 40 years

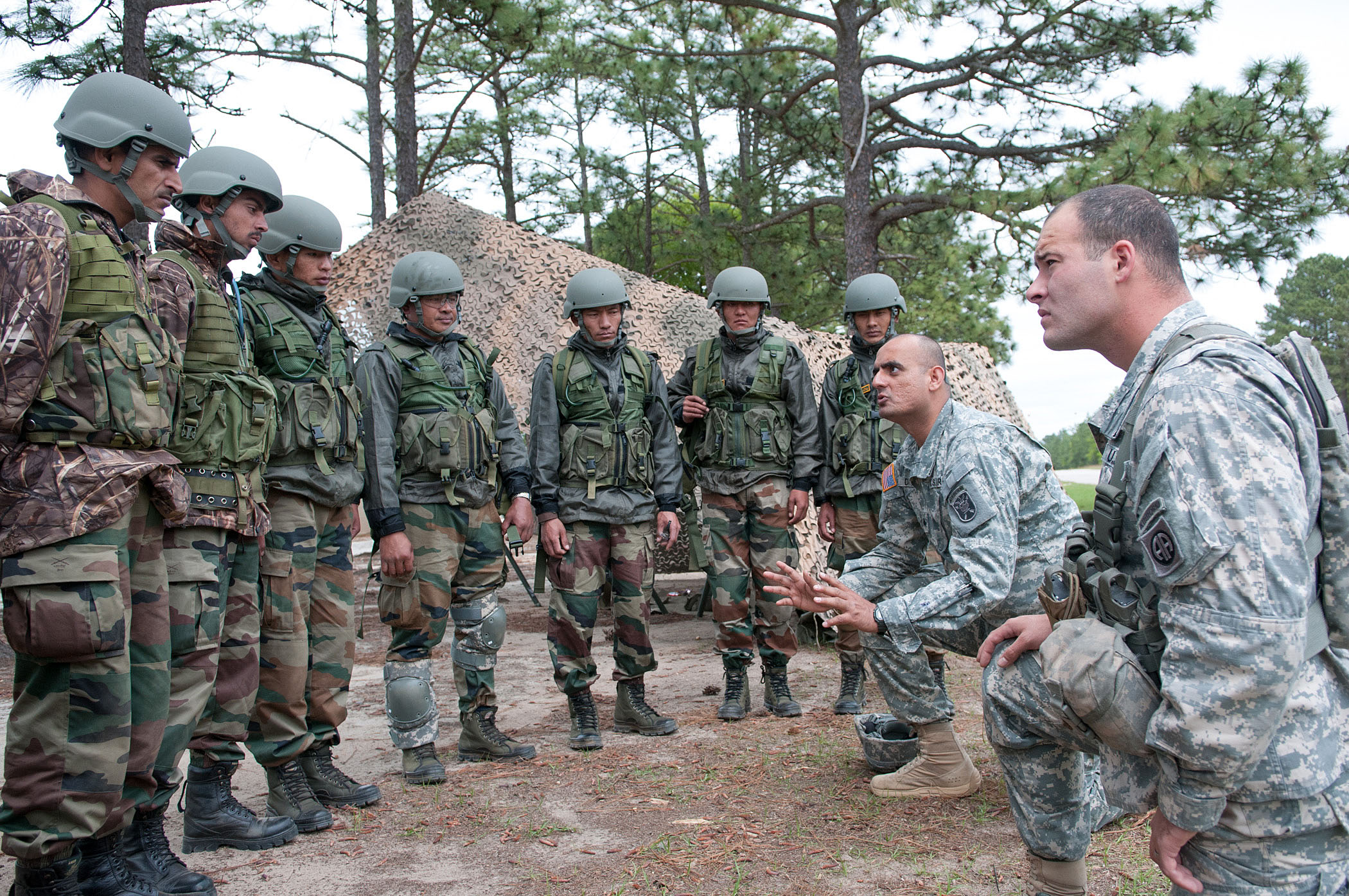
Sgt. Balkrishna Dave, an India-born U.S. Army paratrooper explains weapons range safety procedures to Indian Army soldiers before their firing of American machine guns at Yudh Abhyas in May 2013

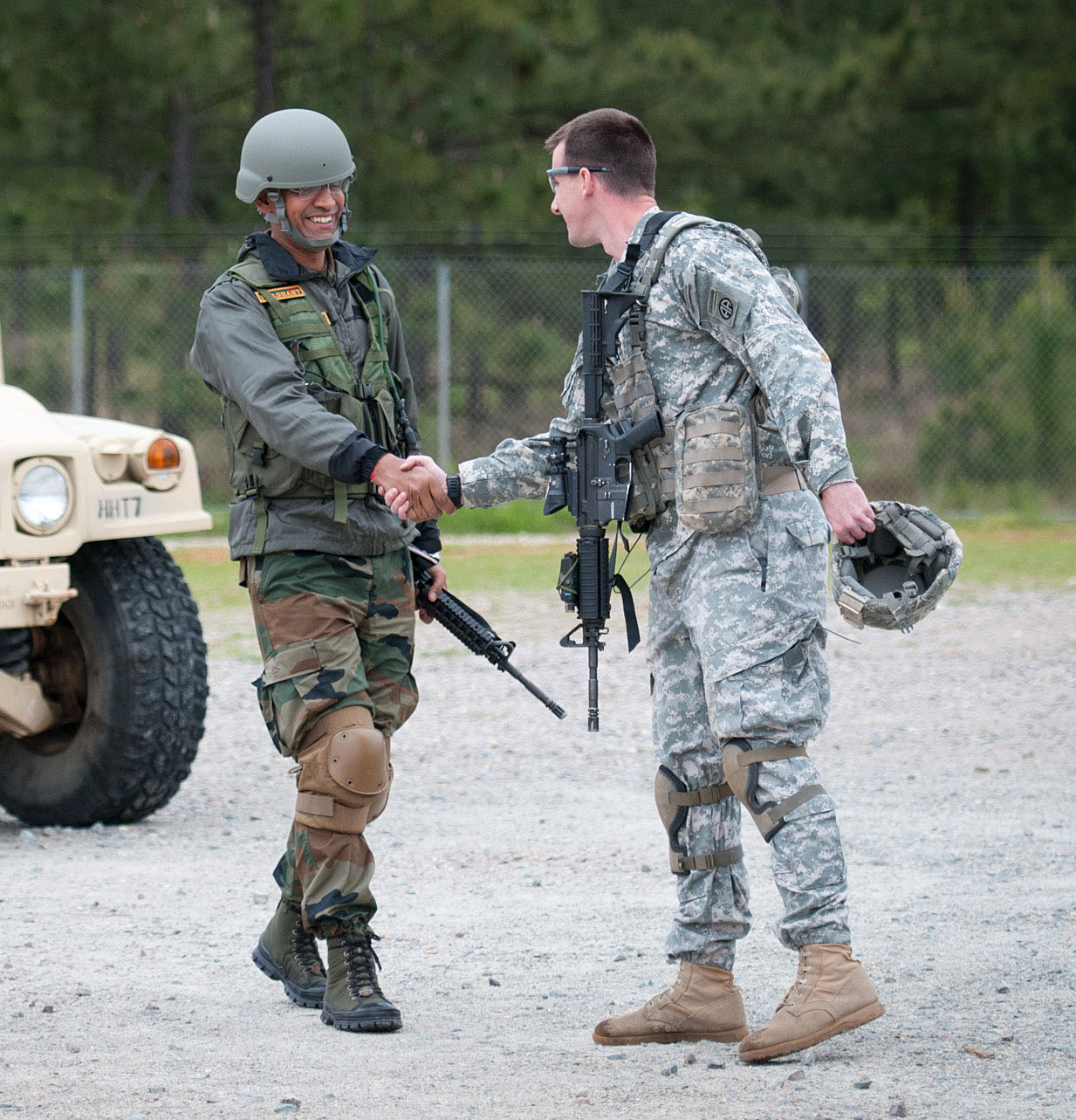
An Indian Army officer is greeted by a U.S. Army officer at Fort Bragg in Cumberland County, North Carolina in May 2013

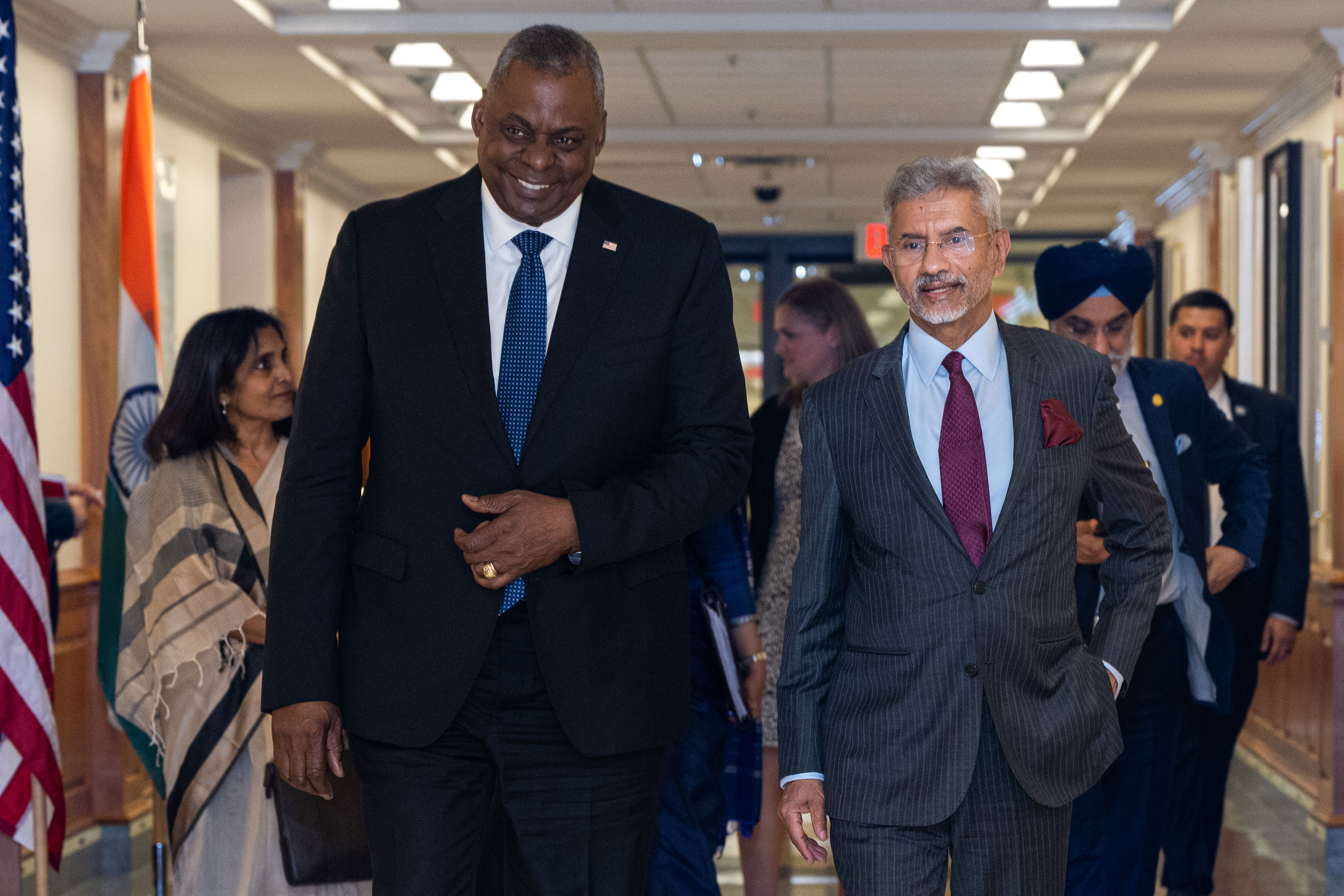
Indian External Affairs Minister S. Jaishankar meets U.S. Secretary of Defense of the United States Lloyd Austin at The Pentagon in Arlington County, Virginia in September 2022

Though the Indian Air Force never operated the F-86 Sabre, a small group of Indian Air Force pilots trained on the aircraft in the United States in 1963–65 under a brief diplomatic arrangement. The training contributed to doctrinal exposure rather than operational deployment.

The US has four "foundational" agreements that it signs with its defence partners. The Pentagon describes the agreements as "routine instruments that the US uses to promote military cooperation with partner-nations". American officials have stated that the agreements are not prerequisites for bilateral defence co-operation, but make it simpler and more cost-effective to carry out activities such as refueling aircraft or ships in each other's countries and providing disaster relief. The first of the four agreements, the General Security Of Military Information Agreement (GSOMIA), was signed by India and the US in 2002. The agreement enables the sharing of military intelligence between the two countries and requires each country to protect the others' classified information.

The second agreement, the Logistics Exchange Memorandum of Agreement (LEMOA), was signed by the two countries on August 29, 2016. The LEMOA permits the military of either country to use the others' bases for re-supplying or carrying out repairs. The agreement does not make the provision of logistical support binding on either country, and requires individual clearance for each request. The third agreement, Communications Compatibility and Security Agreement (COMCASA) was signed during the inaugural 2+2 dialogue in September 2018. It is an India-specific variant of Communications and Information Security Memorandum of Agreement (CISMOA) that enables the two countries to share secure communication and exchange information on approved equipment during bilateral and multinational training exercises and operations. The fourth agreement, the Basic Exchange and Cooperation Agreement (BECA), signed in 2020, permits the exchange of unclassified and controlled unclassified geospatial products, topographical, nautical, and aeronautical data, products and services between India and the US National Geospatial-Intelligence Agency (NGA).

Harsh V. Pant, professor of International relations at King's College London, highlighted the importance of India to US strategic planning, saying: "India is key to the US' ability to create a stable balance of power in the larger Indo-Pacific and at a time of resource constraints, it needs partners like India to shore up its sagging credibility in the region in face of Chinese onslaught." Robert Boggs, professor of South Asia Studies at the Near East South Asia Center for Strategic Studies, opines that the US "overestimates both India's desire to improve the relationship and the benefits doing so would bring".

As part of America's policies to counter China, one of the first Trump administration's policies was to make India a major defence partner, for which it was in talks with Indian representatives to sell highly technologically advanced Predator drones. India has floated a tender to buy 100 multi-role fighter aircraft in the Indian MRCA competition (also called the "Mother of all defence deals"), worth around US$15 billion under Narendra Modi's Make in India initiative. Although the deal was yet to be finalised as of 2018, the Trump administration pushed for sales of advanced F-16 jet fighters, and F/A-18 Super Hornet.

The Indian Army and US Army have conducted an annual training practice called Yudh Abhyas since 2002. In June 2015, US defence secretary Ashton Carter visited India and became the first American defence secretary to visit an Indian military command. In December of the same year, Manohar Parrikar became the first Indian defence minister to visit the US Pacific Command. In March 2016, India rejected a proposal by the US to join naval patrols in the South China Sea alongside Japan and Australia. Defense Minister Manohar Parrikar said: "India has never taken part in any joint patrol; we only do joint exercises. The question of joint patrol does not arise."

In January 2017, Peter Lavoy, Senior Director for South Asian Affairs at the US National Security Council, declared that the partnership between India and the United States under Barack Obama's administration had been "incredibly successful". Lavoy stated, "I can tell you quite definitively that due to our partnerships, several terrorism plots were foiled. Indian lives and American lives were saved because of this partnership."

On October 27, 2020, the United States and India signed the Basic Exchange and Cooperation Agreement (BECA), enabling greater information-sharing and further defense cooperation, to counter China's growing military power in the region. During the 2+2 ministerial dialogue, the last agreement of four so-called "foundational agreements" for sharing sensitive information and sales of advanced military hardware was signed.

On August 16, 2022, US Air Force Secretary Frank Kendall said that "the Indian defence attaché now has un-escorted access to The Pentagon which is commencement with our close relationship with India's status as a major defense partner," and added that "if you don't think un-escorted access to the Pentagon is a big deal, I can't get into The Pentagon without an escort".

During Modi's visit in 2023, the US and India agreed that Hindustan Aeronautics would jointly produce GE F-414 jet engines. The two sides also reached an agreement to purchase MQ-9B drones.

In 2024, both signed two key agreements to strengthen their defense cooperation: the Security of Supply Arrangement (SOSA), which allows reciprocal priority support for defense-related goods and services; and a Memorandum of Agreement to post Indian Liaison Officers in key US Commands, starting with the US Special Operations Command.

=== Counterterrorism cooperation ===
India–US counterterrorism cooperation has significantly deepened since the early 2000s, evolving into a central pillar of their strategic partnership. The establishment of the Joint Working Group on Counterterrorism in 2001 marked the beginning of systematic collaboration, focusing on intelligence sharing, financial tracking of terrorist networks, and capacity-building through joint training and technology transfer. The 2008 Mumbai attacks served as a catalyst, prompting both nations to intensify intelligence exchanges and operational cooperation, and leading to the signing of the Counterterrorism Cooperation Initiative in 2010. This initiative facilitated closer collaboration on information sharing, investigative best practices, and advanced counterterrorism techniques. High-level dialogues, such as the Homeland Security Dialogue and the 2+2 Ministerial Dialogue, have further institutionalized cooperation, with joint statements increasingly reflecting shared concerns over Pakistan-based terrorist groups and calling for accountability for cross-border attacks.

In recent years, India and the US have expanded their partnership to include joint military exercises focused on counterterrorism, such as Yudh Abhyas and Vajra Prahar, and have worked together in multilateral forums like the Global Counter Terrorism Forum and the Quad Counterterrorism Working Group. Both countries have also coordinated efforts to designate terrorist leaders and groups at the United Nations and have supported actions at the Financial Action Task Force to pressure states supporting terrorism. While the US and India share the goal of combating terrorism, their approaches sometimes diverge due to differing geopolitical priorities and operational capabilities, with the US favoring more direct military action and India emphasizing regional diplomacy and multilateral engagement. Nevertheless, the partnership continues to adapt to emerging threats, with ongoing efforts to enhance intelligence-sharing, law enforcement cooperation, and regional security in the Indo-Pacific.

In April 2025, President Trump condemned terrorist attack in Pahalgam, Jammu and Kashmir, which resulted in the deaths of 26 civilians. In his public remarks, President Trump referred to the attack as “a bad one” and acknowledged the long-standing tensions in the region. In a subsequent interview, Trump emphasized that India would handle the situation independently, saying, “They’ll figure it out one way or another.” He also personally expressed condolences to Indian Prime Minister Narendra Modi, offering full US support following the attack. US State Department spokesperson Tammy Bruce stated that, as President Trump and Secretary of State Marco Rubio had made clear, the United States stood with India and strongly condemned all acts of terrorism. She added that they mourned the lives lost, wished for the swift recovery of the injured, and called for the perpetrators of the heinous act to be brought to justice.

In May 2025, following India's retaliatory response dubbed "Operation Sindoor", India sent a 10-member multi-party delegation led by MP Shashi Tharoor to the US to brief lawmakers, think tanks, and media on the Pahalgam attack and India’s response. The team emphasized the precision and restraint of the strikes on terror camps in Pakistan and Pakistan administered Kashmir, presenting a united stance on national security and cross-border terrorism. During their visit to the 9/11 Memorial in New York, Tharoor and the delegation paid tribute to the victims and underscored the shared global challenge of terrorism, calling for international solidarity and mutual strength to combat it. Tharoor reflected on his personal experience of 9/11—drawing parallels between the US and India as victims of terror—and stressed that India would not remain passive in the face of future attacks, urging that those who finance, train, and harbor terrorists must be held accountable.

==== Pakistan factor ====
India–US counterterrorism cooperation since the 2000s has been marked by growing convergence on the threat posed by Pakistan-based terrorist groups. While both countries have historically maintained separate bilateral relationships with Pakistan, the 2008 Mumbai attacks catalyzed a shift, with the US increasingly acknowledging India's concerns about cross-border terrorism originating from Pakistani soil. Joint statements from high-level dialogues, such as the 2+2 Ministerial Dialogue, have explicitly called on Pakistan to take concrete action against terrorist groups operating from its territory and to bring perpetrators of attacks like the Mumbai attacks, Pathankot attack, and Uri attack to justice. The US has supported India in international forums, including the United Nations Security Council and the Financial Action Task Force (FATF), to pressure Pakistan to curb terror financing and dismantle militant infrastructure.

Despite this alignment, direct joint US–India action against Pakistan has been limited to diplomatic, economic, and multilateral measures rather than coordinated military operations. The US has imposed aid suspensions and advocated for Pakistan's inclusion on the FATF 'grey list' for its failure to act against groups targeting India. India, for its part, has conducted targeted cross-border strikes against terrorist camps in Pakistan and presented evidence of Pakistani complicity in terrorism at the UN, often with US backing. However, operational cooperation—such as intelligence sharing on Pakistan-based threats—remains cautious, with the US sometimes hesitant to share sensitive information fully, reflecting broader geopolitical complexities. Overall, while both countries have not engaged in joint military action against Pakistan, their partnership has strengthened international efforts to hold Pakistan accountable for cross-border terrorism and has elevated the issue in global counterterrorism discourse.

==== Extraditions ====
The most prominent successful terrorist extradition from the United States to India is that of Tahawwur Hussain Rana. In April 2025, Rana was extradited to India for his alleged role in the 2008 Mumbai terror attacks, which killed 166 people. This marked the first such extradition in a terrorism-related case between the two countries. The extradition followed years of legal proceedings and diplomatic efforts, with the US Supreme Court ultimately rejecting Rana's appeals and the US Department of Justice actively assisting Indian authorities in the process. Rana was wanted in India for allegedly aiding Lashkar-e-Taiba, a Pakistani militant group blamed for the attacks. At a joint press conference with the Indian Prime Minister Narendra Modi on February 14, president Donald Trump stated that the United States was returning "a very violent man" to India immediately to face justice there.

== Nuclear cooperation ==
=== Pokhran tests ===
In 1998, India tested nuclear weapons which resulted in several US, Japanese, and European sanctions on India. India's then-defence minister, George Fernandes, said that India's program was necessary as it provided a deterrence to potential nuclear threats. Most of the sanctions imposed on India were removed by 2001. India has categorically stated that it will never use weapons first but will retaliate if attacked.

The economic sanctions imposed by the United States in response to India's nuclear tests in May 1998 appeared, at least initially, to seriously damage India–US relations. President Bill Clinton imposed wide-ranging sanctions pursuant to the 1994 Nuclear Proliferation Prevention Act. US sanctions on Indian entities involved in the nuclear industry and opposition to international financial institution loans for non-humanitarian assistance projects in India. The United States encouraged India to sign the Comprehensive Nuclear-Test-Ban Treaty (CTBT) immediately and without condition. The United States also called for restraint in missile and nuclear testing and deployment by both India and Pakistan. The non-proliferation dialogue initiated after the 1998 nuclear tests has bridged many of the gaps in understanding between the countries.

=== Easing of tension ===
In late September 2001, President Bush lifted sanctions imposed under the terms of the 1994 Nuclear Proliferation Prevention Act following India's nuclear tests in May 1998. A succession of non-proliferation dialogues bridged many of the gaps in understanding between the countries.

In December 2006, the US Congress passed the historic Henry J. Hyde US–India Peaceful Atomic Cooperation Act, which allows direct civilian nuclear commerce with India for the first time in 30 years. US policy had been opposed to nuclear cooperation with India in prior years because India had developed nuclear weapons against international conventions, and had never signed the Nuclear Non-Proliferation Treaty. The legislation clears the way for India to buy US nuclear reactors and fuel for civilian use.

The India–United States Civil Nuclear Agreement—also referred to as the "123 Agreement"—signed on October 10, 2008, is a bilateral agreement for peaceful nuclear cooperation which governs civil nuclear trade between American and Indian firms participating in each other's civil nuclear energy sector. For the agreement to be operational, nuclear vendors and operators must comply with India's 2010 Nuclear Liability Act which stipulates that nuclear suppliers, contractors and operators must bear financial responsibility in case of an accident.

On March 27, 2019, India and the US signed an agreement to "strengthen bilateral security and civil nuclear cooperation" including the construction of six American nuclear reactors in India.

=== Post– 9/11 ===
India's contribution to the war on terror has helped India's diplomatic relations with several countries. Over the past few years, India has held numerous joint military exercises with United States and European nations that have resulted in a strengthened US–India and EU–India bilateral relationship.

However, India has not signed the CTBT, or the Nuclear Non-Proliferation Treaty, claiming the discriminatory nature of the treaty that allows the five declared nuclear countries of the world to keep their nuclear arsenals and develop them using computer simulation testing. Prior to its nuclear testing, India had pressed for a comprehensive destruction of nuclear weapons by all countries of the world in a time-bound frame. This was not favoured by the United States and by certain other countries. Presently, India has declared its policy of "no-first use of nuclear weapons" and the maintenance of a "credible nuclear deterrence". The US, under President George W. Bush, lifted most of its sanctions on India and resumed military co-operation. Relations with the US have considerably improved in recent years, with the two countries taking part in joint naval exercises off the coast of India and joint air exercises both in India as well as in the United States.

India has pushed for reforms in the United Nations and in the World Trade Organization with mixed results. India's candidature for a permanent seat at the UN Security Council is currently backed by several countries including Russia, United Kingdom, France, Germany, Japan, Brazil, African Union nations and the US. In 2005, the US signed a nuclear co-operation agreement with India even though the latter is not a part of the Nuclear Non-Proliferation Treaty. The United States agreed that India's strong nuclear non-proliferation record made it an exception and persuaded other Nuclear Suppliers Group members to sign similar deals with India.

On March 2, 2006, India and the United States signed the Indo-US Nuclear Pact on co-operation in civilian nuclear field. This was signed during the four days state visit of US President George Bush in India. On its part, India would separate its civilian and military nuclear programmes, and the civilian programmes would be brought under the safeguards of International Atomic Energy Agency (IAEA). The United States would sell India the reactor technologies and the nuclear fuel for setting up and upgrading its civilian nuclear programme. The US Congress needed to ratify this pact since US federal law prohibits the trading of nuclear technologies and materials outside the framework of the Nuclear Suppliers Group (NSG).

== Economic relations ==
The United States is one of India's largest direct investors. From 1991 to 2004, the stock of FDI inflow increased from US$11 million to $344.4 million, and totaling $4.13 billion. This is a compound rate increase of 57.5 percent annually. Indian direct investments abroad began in 1992, and Indian corporations and registered partnership firms now can and do invest in businesses up to 100 percent of their net worth. India's largest outgoing investments are in the manufacturing sector, which accounts for 54.8 percent of the country's foreign investments. The second largest are in non-financial services (software development), accounting for 35.4 percent of investments. According to the data of the commerce ministry, in 2021–22, bilateral trade in goods between the two countries crossed $119.42 billion. Exports to the US increased to $76.11 billion in 2021-22 from $51.62 billion in previous fiscal year, while imports rose to $43.31 billion as compared to about $29 billion in 2020–21. Tensions arose in 2025 as US President Donald Trump imposed tariffs on Indian goods, particularly pharmaceuticals, prompting negotiations to mitigate economic impacts. Nearly half of all generic drugs in the US came from India, with Indian generics saving $219 billion in healthcare costs in 2022 alone. In late July 2025, Trump threatened to raise tariffs on Indian imports to 25% if the allies failed to complete a long-term trade deal.

As of 2025, according to the Global Trade Research Initiative, the US earns between $80–85 billion annually from India through sectors like higher education, digital services, financial consulting, intellectual property, and defense sales. These earnings create a net surplus of $35–40 billion for the US.

A major 500 billion dollar trade deal is expected to be signed between the two countries to expand their trade relations and give India better access to American consumer market. The deal is expected to be signed in the QUAD summit 2025 in India with US President Donald Trump present there.

After a long time period of tariff tensions between the two countries, on 2 February 2026, it was reported that India and the US have signed a significant trade agreement. According to the deal the US tariffs on goods from India will be about 18%. In return India agreed to reduce to zero, trade barriers on products from the US, while expanding purchases from the US energy, technology, agriculture and defense sectors. The agreement was achieved after a key political element was settled, India will stop buying Russian oil. In September 2026, the US House of Representatives voted to advance a bill authorizing 100% tariffs on countries, including India, that purchase oil and gas from Russia, while also extending existing sanctions on Iran.

=== Trade relations ===
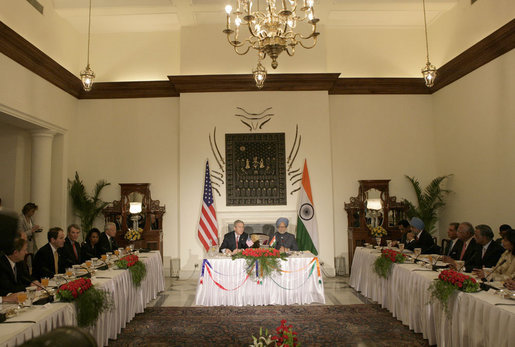
US President George W. Bush and Indian Prime Minister Manmohan Singh during a meeting with Indian and American business leaders in New Delhi in March 2006

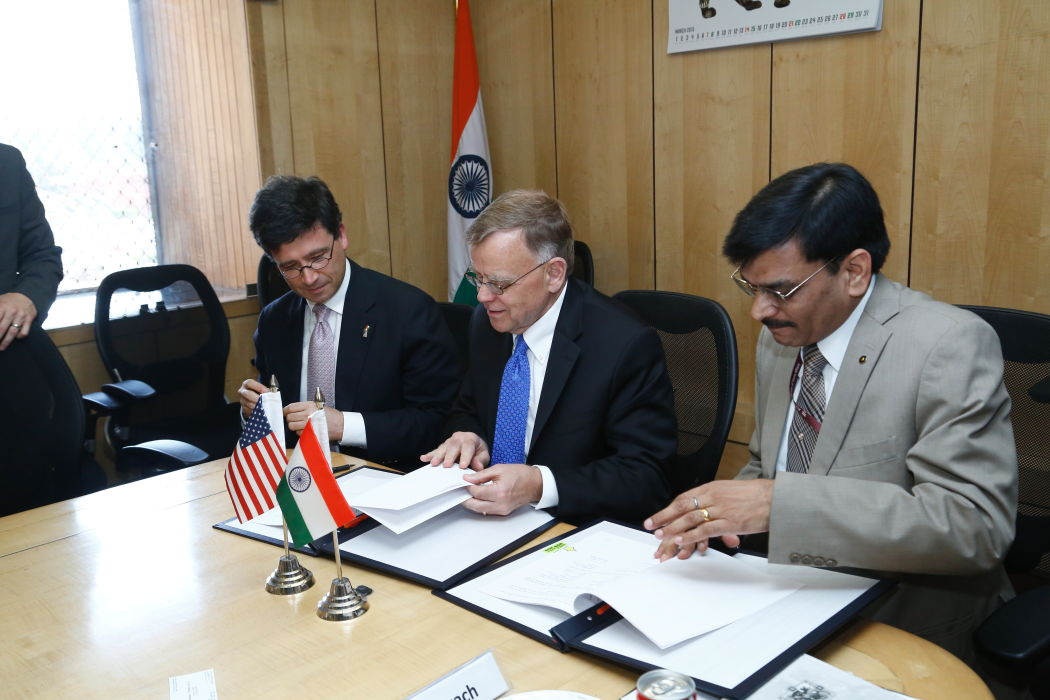
US Food and Drug Administration and Indian Export Inspection Council officials review a memorandum of understanding on food safety in 2015

The United States is India's largest trading partner since 2021, and India is its 7th largest trading partner. In 2017, the US exported $25.7 billion worth of goods to India, and imported $48.6 billion worth of Indian goods. Major imports from India include information technology services, textiles, machinery, gems and diamonds, chemicals, iron and steel products, coffee, tea, and other edible food products. Major American items imported by India include aircraft, fertilisers, computer hardware, scrap metal, and medical equipment.

The United States is also India's largest investment partner, with a direct investment of $10 billion (accounting for 9 percent of total foreign investment). Americans have made notable foreign investments in India's power generation, telecommunications, ports, roads, petroleum exploration and processing, and mining industries. American imports from India amounted to $46.6 billion or 2% of its overall imports, and 15.3% of India's overall exports in 2015. Major goods exported from India to the US include gemstones, precious metals and coins, pharmaceuticals, oil, machinery, textiles (including knit & crochet), organic chemicals, vehicles, and iron or steel products. American exports to India amounted to $20.5 billion or 5.2% of India's overall imports in 2015. Major commodities exported from the US to India include gemstones, precious metals and coins, machinery, electronic equipment, medical equipment, oil, aircraft/spacecraft, plastics, organic chemicals, fruits and nuts.

In July 2005, President Bush and Prime Minister Manmohan Singh created a new programme called the Trade Policy Forum. It is run by a representative from each nation. The United States Trade Representative was Rob Portman, and the Indian Commerce Secretary then-Minister of Commerce Kamal Nath. The goal of the programme is to increase bilateral trade and investment flow. There are five main sub-divisions of the Trade Policy Forum, including The Agricultural Trade group, which has three main objectives: agreeing on terms that will allow India to export mangoes to the United States; permitting India's Agricultural and Process Food Products Export Development Authority (APEDA) to certify Indian products to the standards of the US Department of Agriculture; and executing regulation procedures for approving edible wax on fruit.

The goals of the Tariff and Non-Tariff Barriers group include agreeing that insecticides manufactured by US companies can be sold throughout India. India had also agreed to cut special regulations on trading carbonated drinks, many medicinal drugs, and lowering regulations on many imports that are not of an agricultural nature. Both nations have agreed to discuss improved facets of Indian regulation in the trade of jewellery, computer parts, motorcycles, fertiliser, and those tariffs that affect American exporting of boric acid. The group has also discussed matters such as those wishing to break into the accounting market, Indian companies gaining licenses for the telecommunications industry, and setting policies regarding Indian media and broadcasting markets. Other foci include the exchange of valuable information on recognizing different professional services, discussing the movement and positioning of people in developing industries, continuation of talks on financial services markets, limitation of equities, insurance, retail, joint investment in agricultural processing and transportation industries, and small business initiatives.

On August 3, 2018, India became the third Asian nation to be granted Strategic Trade Authorization-1 (STA-1) status by the United States. STA-1 enables the export of high-technology products in civil space and defence from the US to India. On February 15, 2023, Air India announced an order of 470 jets, out of which 220 jets would be bought from Boeing and the other 250 from Airbus. This is one of the biggest aircraft orders in the commercial jet industry. The deal was acknowledged by both the US President and India's Prime Minister's Office. During Modi's visit in 2023, resolution of six of seven outstanding WTO disputes between the US and India was reached through mutually agreed solutions and market access.

On July 30, 2025, US President Donald Trump announced that Indian products would be subject to 25% tariffs upon arrival in the United States starting August 1, and that a "penalty" would be added for the purchase of Russian oil. On August 6, 2025, President Trump raised the tariff to 50%, a 25% increase, over India's purchase of Russian oil. The new rate will take effect on August 27, 2025.

On October 22, 2025, the United States imposed sanctions on Russian oil companies Rosneft and Lukoil, affecting their customers in India.

US-India goods trade in billions of US dollars (1990−2025)
	1990	2000	2010	2015	2016	2017	2018	2019	2020	2021	2022	2023	2024	2025
US exports to India	2.5	3.7	19.2	21.5	21.6	25.6	33.2	34.2	27.1	39.8	46.9	40.3	41.5	38.2
US imports from India	3.2	10.7	29.5	44.8	46.0	48.5	54.2	57.9	51.3	73.3	85.5	83.7	87.3	88.2
Trade balance	−0.7	−7.0	−10.3	−24.4	−24.4	−22.9	−21.1	−23.7	−24.2	−33.5	−38.6	−43.3	−45.8	−50.0

==== Fentanyl ====
India has increasingly been implicated in the illicit fentanyl trade, with a 2025 US intelligence report highlighting its role as a significant supplier of precursor chemicals, second only to China. The report, published in March 2025, notes that Indian pharmaceutical companies have been linked to exports of fentanyl precursors to Mexico and Guatemala, fueling the opioid crisis in the US This follows India's inclusion in the 2024 US Department of Justice indictments, targeting executives from pharmaceutical firms involved in the trade.

=== Science and technology ===
On January 31, 2023, the US–India Civil Space Joint Working Group met for the eighth time. The group is a collaboration of space agencies ISRO and NASA. The working group planned to launch The NASA-ISRO Synthetic Aperture Radar mission in 2024 which is expected to map Earth using two different radar frequencies to monitor resources like water, forests, and agriculture.

In January 2023, the national security advisors of India and the US announced the launch of the US–India Initiative on Critical and Emerging Technologies (iCET). Under iCET, both sides will work together in the fields of artificial intelligence, quantum technologies, advanced wireless technology, space and semiconductor supply chain resilience. India signed the Artemis Accords in 2023, joining 26 other countries working on exploration of the moon, Mars, and beyond; additionally, NASA will provide advanced training to ISRO astronauts with the goal of launching a joint effort to the International Space Station in 2024.

=== Role of Indian diaspora ===
The Indian diaspora significantly bolsters India–US economic relations through key contributions in technology, entrepreneurship, and academia. Their presence in Silicon Valley and leadership roles in various sectors fosters innovation and collaboration, while their entrepreneurial ventures strengthen economic ties. Additionally, the diaspora serves as a vital link for investments between the two countries, and their involvement in education and research contributes to advancements in science and technology. Beyond economics, the diaspora's cultural initiatives promote understanding and dialogue, further enhancing the overall relationship between India and the US.

== India-US strategic partnership ==
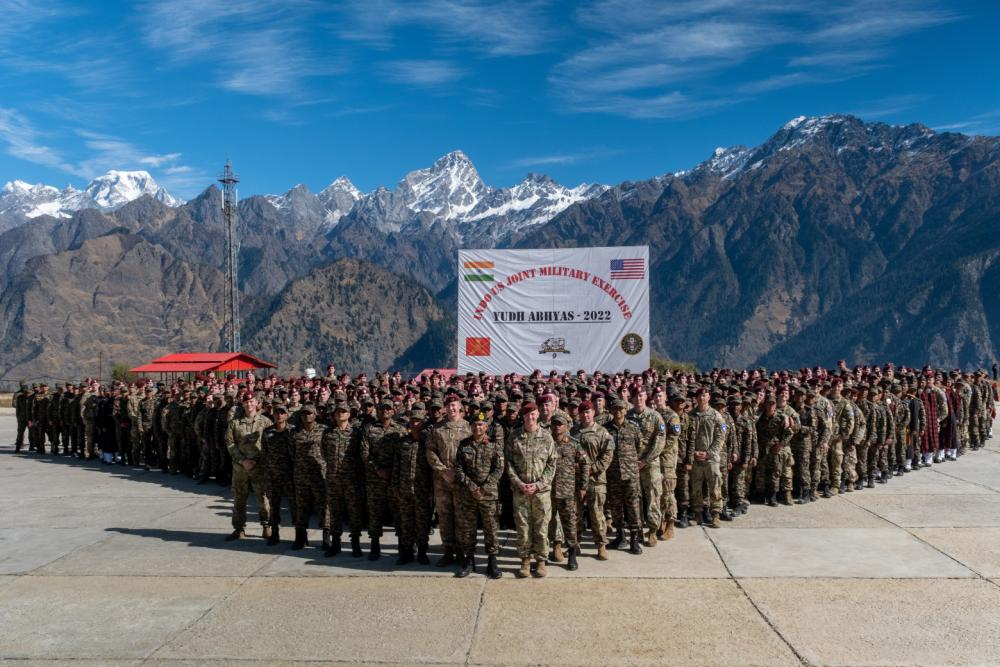
US and Indian Army soldiers during the opening ceremony of Yudh Abhyas military exercise in November 2022

=== During the Cold War (1960–1990) ===
India–US strategic relations grew in the early 1960s, as the rise of the People's Republic of China worried policymakers in Washington, D.C. The Chinese government's assertion in Tibet, its role in the Korean War, and other such acts concerned Washington. As relations between India and China were heated during the late '50s, the Americans found a golden opportunity to take advantage of this situation to promote India as a counterweight to China.

=== Post–Cold War era (1990–2014) ===
After the end of the Cold War, Indian and American interests converged in a number of areas, including counter-terrorism, promotion of democracy, counter-proliferation, freedom of navigation in the Indian Ocean, and the balance of power in Asia. India emerged in the 21st century as increasingly vital to core US foreign policy interests. India, a dominant actor in its region and the home of more than one billion citizens, is now often characterised as a nascent great power and an "indispensable partner" of the US, one that many analysts view as a potential counterweight to the growing clout of China.

In a meeting between President George W. Bush and Prime Minister Atal Bihari Vajpayee in November 2001, the two leaders expressed a strong interest in transforming the US–India bilateral relationship. High-level meetings and concrete cooperation between the two countries increased during 2002 and 2003. In January 2004, the US and India launched the "Next Steps in Strategic Partnership" (NSSP), which was both a milestone in the transformation of the bilateral relationship and a blueprint for its further progress. In July 2005, Bush hosted Prime Minister Manmohan Singh in Washington, D.C. The two leaders announced the successful completion of the NSSP, as well as other agreements which further enhanced cooperation in the areas of civil nuclear, civil space, and high-technology commerce. Other initiatives announced included a US–India economic dialogue; the fight against HIV/AIDS; disaster relief; technology cooperation; an agriculture knowledge initiative; a trade policy forum; energy dialogue; CEO Forum; and an initiative to assist each other in furthering democracy and freedom. President Bush made a reciprocal visit to India in March 2006, during which the progress of these initiatives were reviewed, and new initiatives were launched.

As the world's oldest and largest democracies, respectively, the US and India share historic ties. India is a founding member of the "Community of Democracies"—a prominent endeavor of the United States for promotion of democracy. However, India rejected a suggestion by the US about setting up a Centre for Asian Democracy.

Indian Prime Minister Manmohan Singh was the guest of honour at the first state dinner of the administration of US President Barack Obama, which took place on November 24, 2009. Obama later visited India from November 6–9, 2010, signing numerous trade and defence agreements with India. He addressed the joint session of the Indian parliament in New Delhi—becoming only the second US president to do so—and announced that the United States would lend its support to India's bid for a permanent seat in the United Nations Security Council, signifying the growing strategic dimension of the relationship between the world's two largest democracies.

=== After the rise of the BJP (2014–present) ===
In 2016, India and the United States signed the Logistics Exchange Memorandum of Agreement and India was declared a Major Defense Partner of the United States. During US President Trump's visit to India in 2020, both sides agree to establish "Comprehensive Global Strategic Partnership".

In both the 2017 Doklam standoff and the 2020–2021 China–India skirmishes, the United States provided India with intelligence it possessed, and the two sides discussed the crisis on Ladakh border. The US was also involved in securing the release of Indian pilot Abhinandan Varthaman from Pakistani custody following the 2019 Balakot airstrike. According to former US secretary of state Mike Pompeo, the US played a role in extinguishing tensions between India and Pakistan in 2019, when Pakistan and India were at the verge of nuclear war.

The strategic meetings between both countries is called the '2+2' dialogue. Representatives holding Foreign and Defense portfolios from each of the two countries participate in this meeting. The inaugural 2+2 dialogue between the two nations took place in September 2018 during the first Trump administration. The meeting involved the foreign minister Sushma Swaraj and then Defence Minister Nirmala Sitharaman representing India, while Secretary of State Mike Pompeo and Secretary of Defence James Mattis represented the United States. Some agreements, including the Communications Compatibility and Security Agreement (COMCASA) (2018), were signed in these meetings.

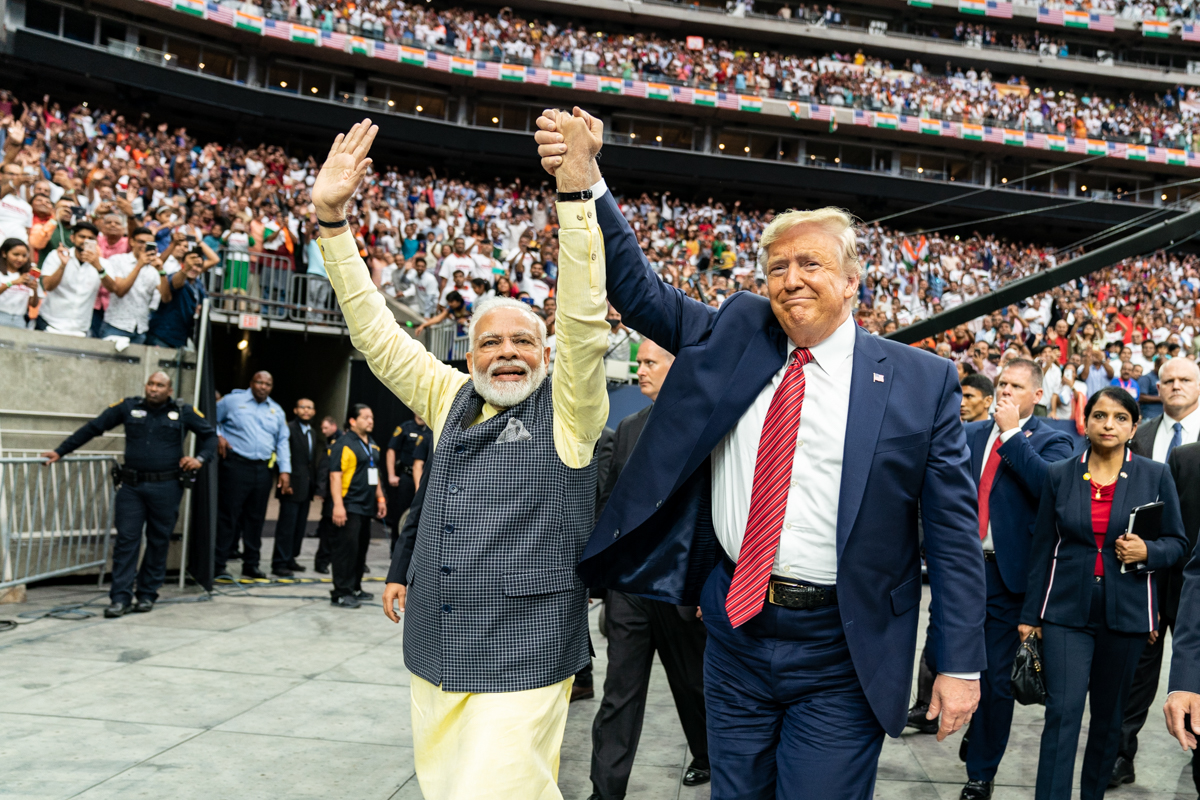
Prime Minister Narendra Modi and President Donald Trump attending the Howdy Modi event in Houston, 2019

On October 27, 2020, US and India signed a military agreement on sharing sensitive satellite data. The Basic Exchange and Cooperation Agreement, or BECA, allows the US's strategic partners to access a range of sensitive geospatial and aeronautical data which is useful for military actions. In December 2020, US India Business Council president Nisha Desai Biswal claimed that the ties between the two nations will continue and grow stronger in 2021, as the Biden administration would prioritize their trade deals for a prospering economic relationship. In December 2022, based on BECA, the United States provided real-time location information of the PLA soldiers to help India fight China, during the confrontation in Arunachal Pradesh.

=== Observer reactions ===
US Chairman of the Joint Chiefs of Staff Mike Mullen encouraged stronger military ties between the two nations, and said that "India has emerged as an increasingly important strategic partner [of the US]". In 2010, US Undersecretary of State William J. Burns also said, "Never has there been a moment when India and America mattered more to each other."

In the wake of the 2025 India–Pakistan conflict, Indian Member of Parliament Shashi Tharoor expressed concern that US President Donald Trump made a false equivalence between India and Pakistan by equating the perpetrator with the victim in the aftermath of the terrorist incident in Kashmir.

=== Post interim trade agreement ===
Following this economic agreement between the two countries, the strategic cooperation grew tighter. On 16, February 2026, it was reported that India seized three Iranian oil tankers, that were sanctioned by the US.

== Triangular relations ==
=== Africa ===
India and the United States have held two "India–US Dialogue on Africa" sessions as of 2024.

=== Asia ===
In the 21st century, India–United States cooperation has aimed to contain China in Asia and the broader Indo-Pacific with the help of broader organizations, such as the Quad which includes Japan and Australia. In 2009, Robert Blake, Assistant Secretary of State for South and Central Asian Affairs, dismissed any concerns over a rift with India regarding American AfPak policy in South Asia, calling India and the United States "natural allies". However, American ties with Pakistan and Bangladesh have sometimes clashed with India's military and political preferences in its neighborhood.

India and United States have differences over the role of US's mediation in India's conflicts in its neighborhood that particularly involve Pakistan. For instance, in 2025, US President Donald Trump claimed multiple times how he stopped the 2025 India-Pakistan conflict by leveraging trade—despite US Vice President JD Vance who earlier stated that US would not intervene— while India firmly rejected the claims and stated that the military operations that were part of Operation Sindoor only ceased when India's military objectives were achieved. Both the Indian External Affairs Minister S. Jaishankar and the Indian Defence Minister Rajnath Singh rejected the claims on different occasions with the former attributing the cessation of hostilities to military actions by India.

In August 2025, Pakistan’s army chief Field Marshal Asim Munir reportedly stated during a dinner in Florida that if Pakistan faced an existential threat, “we’ll take half the world down with us.” India condemned the reported remarks as “nuclear sabre-rattling” and described them as irresponsible, with the Ministry of External Affairs also expressing regret that such statements were made on the soil of a friendly third country, referring to the United States.

=== European and Western countries ===
==== Canada ====
Both Canada and the United States allege that the Indian government ordered assassinations on Sikh separatists who were their citizens. Regarding the 2023 Canada–India diplomatic row on this matter, State Department spokesman Matthew Miller said in October 2024 that "We wanted to see the government of India cooperate with Canada in its investigation. Obviously, they have not; they have chosen an alternate path."

==== United Kingdom ====
Serious tension erupted over American demands that India be given independence, a proposition Churchill vehemently rejected. For years Roosevelt had encouraged Britain's disengagement from India. The American position was based on principled opposition to colonialism, practical concern for the outcome of the war, and the expectation of a large American role in a post-colonial era. In 1942 when the Congress Party launched a Quit India movement, the colonial authorities arrested tens of thousands of activists (including Mahatma Gandhi). Meanwhile, India became the main American staging base for aid to China. Churchill threatened to resign if Roosevelt continued to push his demands, and Roosevelt backed down. Churchill was a believer in the integrity of the British Empire, but he was voted out of office in the summer of 1945. Attlee's new Labour government was much more favorable toward Indian aspirations. The process of decolonization was highlighted by the independence Britain granted to India, Pakistan and Ceylon (now Sri Lanka) in 1947. The United States approved, but provided no financial or diplomatic support.

==== Ukraine ====
During the Biden administration and the start of the Russian invasion of Ukraine, there were initially significant tensions regarding India's ties with Russia. However, the second Trump administration is anticipated to seek a quick end to the conflict, likely reducing India's distance from the United States on European security issues.

== Cultural relations ==
Cultural relations between India and the United States are among the strongest pillars of the bilateral relationship and are largely driven by deep people-to-people ties, shared democratic norms, and sustained educational, artistic, and intellectual exchange. The Indian-American diaspora—numbering over 4.5 million people as of 2025—plays a central role in bridging the two societies and has become one of the most influential immigrant communities in the United States. Indian Americans are highly represented in science, technology, medicine, business, academia, and public service, contributing significantly to the U.S. economy while maintaining close cultural, familial, and emotional ties to India.

Educational exchange has been an important aspect of cultural engagement. India has consistently been among the top sources of international students to the United States, particularly in STEM fields, management, and research-oriented disciplines. Student, research, and high-skilled worker visa programs have facilitated long-term professional networks and innovation ecosystems linking Silicon Valley, major U.S. universities, and India’s technology hubs. Many alumni of U.S. institutions have gone on to play roles in India’s private sector, civil society, and government, reinforcing a cycle of cooperation between India and the United States.

Language, media, cuisine, festivals, and religion further reinforce cultural familiarity. English as a shared working language, combined with the global reach of Indian and American media, has helped normalize cross-cultural consumption. Indian festivals such as Diwali and Holi are increasingly celebrated in U.S. cities, while American cultural norms and popular culture are deeply embedded in urban India, especially among younger generations.

=== Public opinion and polling ===
Public opinion data consistently reflects strong mutual goodwill. According to annual World Affairs surveys conducted by Gallup, India has ranked among the most favorably viewed countries by Americans. In 2015, 71% of Americans held a favorable view of India, rising to 74% in 2017, 72% in 2019, 75% in 2020, 77% in 2022, and 70% in 2023. India has frequently ranked within the top tier of countries viewed positively by the American public, ahead of many traditional allies.

Reciprocal sentiment in India is equally strong. A Morning Consult poll conducted in August 2021, following the fall of Afghanistan, found that 79% of Indians viewed the United States favorably, with only 10% holding unfavorable views—the highest favorability rating recorded among the 15 major countries surveyed. Notably, this rating exceeded Americans’ own favorability toward the United States at the time. These trends underscore the unusually strong public-level foundation of the bilateral relationship.

=== Cinema and visual media ===
Film has been a powerful vehicle of cultural exchange. Indian cinema, including Bollywood and regional industries, has gained a growing audience in the United States, driven by the diaspora as well as increased mainstream exposure through streaming platforms and theatrical releases. Films such as RRR achieved unprecedented commercial and cultural success in the United States in the 2020s, signaling broader American interest in Indian storytelling, music, and spectacle.

American cinema has long enjoyed widespread popularity in India, particularly since the end of the Cold War and India’s economic liberalization. India has emerged as one of the top global markets for Hollywood films, with U.S. studios increasingly tailoring releases, marketing strategies, and collaborations for Indian audiences. Earlier films such as Mississippi Masala also played an important role in exploring the experiences of Indian Americans and race relations in the United States, helping bring South Asian narratives into mainstream American discourse.

=== Health, spirituality, and lifestyle ===
Indian traditions related to health, wellness, and spirituality have had a lasting influence in the United States. Practices such as Yoga and meditation have become widely adopted across American society, spanning fitness, mental health, education, and alternative medicine. Indian spiritual leaders played a formative role in this exchange, most notably Swami Vivekananda, who introduced aspects of Vedanta and yoga philosophy to American audiences at the turn of the twentieth century, helping lay the intellectual foundation for later cross-cultural engagement. In the contemporary period, wellness exchanges continue through academic research, medical collaboration, and cultural tourism.

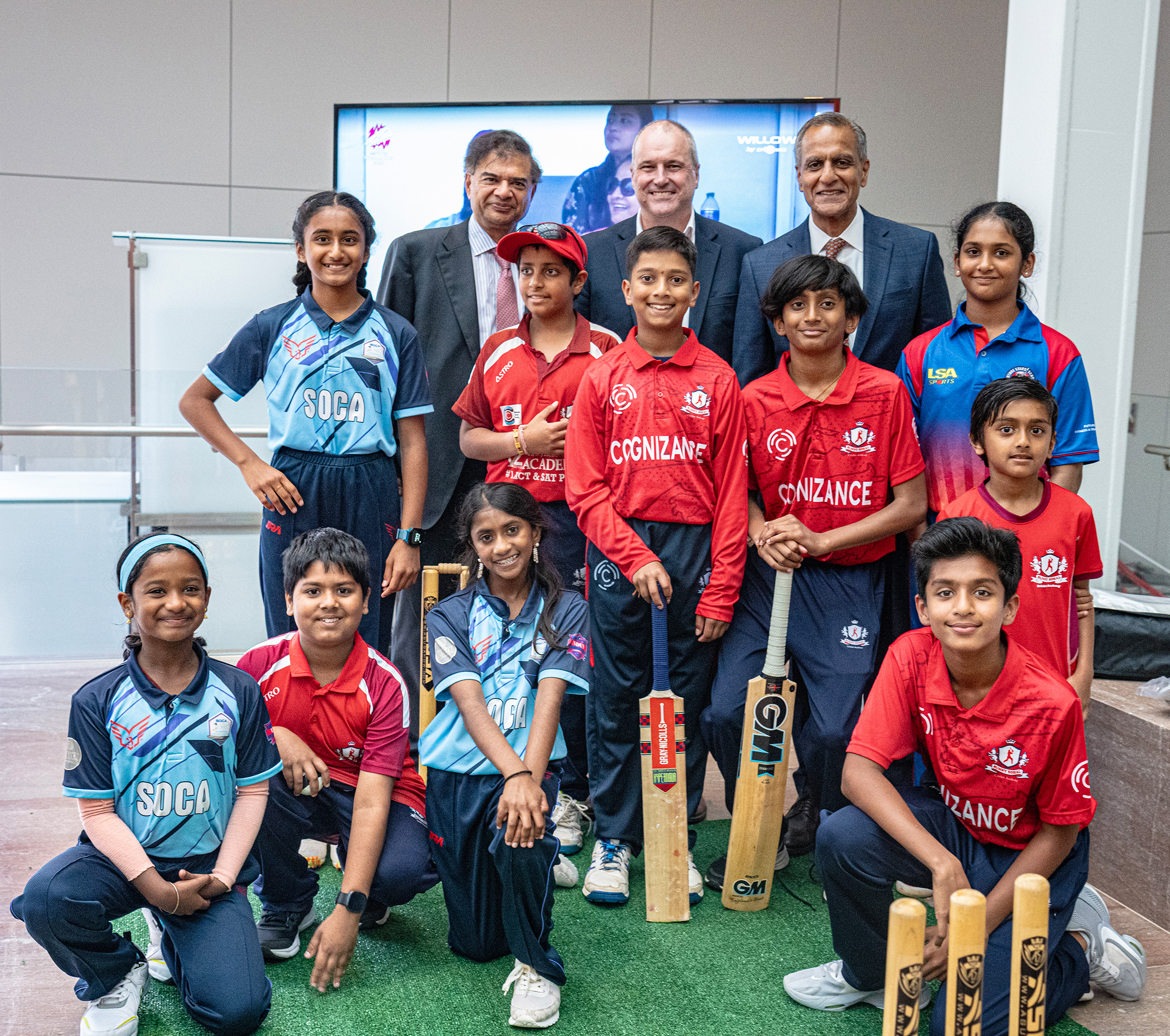
Former U.S. Ambassador to India Richard Verma celebrating the United States hosting the 2024 Men's T20 World Cup

=== Music ===
Musical exchange between India and the United States dates back to the early twentieth century. American music entered India partly through colonial-era networks and was strongly influenced by African American jazz traditions, which resonated with Indian modernist and urban cultural movements. In later decades, rock, pop, hip-hop, and electronic music gained widespread popularity in India, while Indian classical and fusion music influenced American artists and audiences.

In the 21st century, collaborations between Indian and American musicians, composers, and producers have increased, particularly in film scoring, electronic music, and global pop. Indian American artists have played a prominent role in blending genres and shaping transnational musical identities.

=== Sports and recreation ===
Sport has emerged as a growing arena of cultural connection. Cricket was introduced to both India and the United States during the era of the British Empire, but while it flourished in South Asia, the United States gravitated toward baseball following the Civil War.

In the 21st century, the growth of the Indian-American community and increased private investment have helped revive cricket in the United States. The launch of Major League Cricket and the rising popularity of T20 cricket—including the United States co-hosting the 2024 Men's T20 World Cup—marked significant milestones in sporting cooperation and visibility. At the same time, American sports leagues, fitness culture, and recreational norms have gained a substantial following in India, further reinforcing mutual cultural familiarity.

== Public opinion ==
Gallup's annual World Affairs survey shows India is perceived by Americans as their sixth favorite nation in the world, with 71% of Americans viewing India favorably in 2015, and 70% in 2023. Gallup polls found that 74% of Americans viewed India favorably in 2017, 72% in 2019, 75% in 2020 and 77% in 2022. According to a Morning Consult poll conducted in August 2021 after the fall of Afghanistan, 79% of Indians viewed the United States favorably, compared to 10% who viewed the United States unfavorably. This was the highest favorability rating out of all 15 major countries surveyed and higher than US citizens' own favorability rating of the US at the time. According to a 2026 Pew Research Center survey, 45% of Indians had a favorable view of the United States, while 31% had a negative view.

== Embassies and consulates ==
Indian missions in the United States

- Washington, D.C. (Embassy)
- Atlanta (Consulate General)
- Chicago (Consulate General)
- Houston (Consulate General)
- Los Angeles (Consulate General)
- New York City (Consulate General)
- San Francisco (Consulate General)
- Seattle (Consulate General)

United States missions in India

- New Delhi (Embassy)
- Chennai (Consulate General)
- Hyderabad (Consulate General)
- Kolkata (Consulate General)
- Mumbai (Consulate General)
- Bengaluru (Consulate General)
- Ahmedabad (Consulate, Planned)

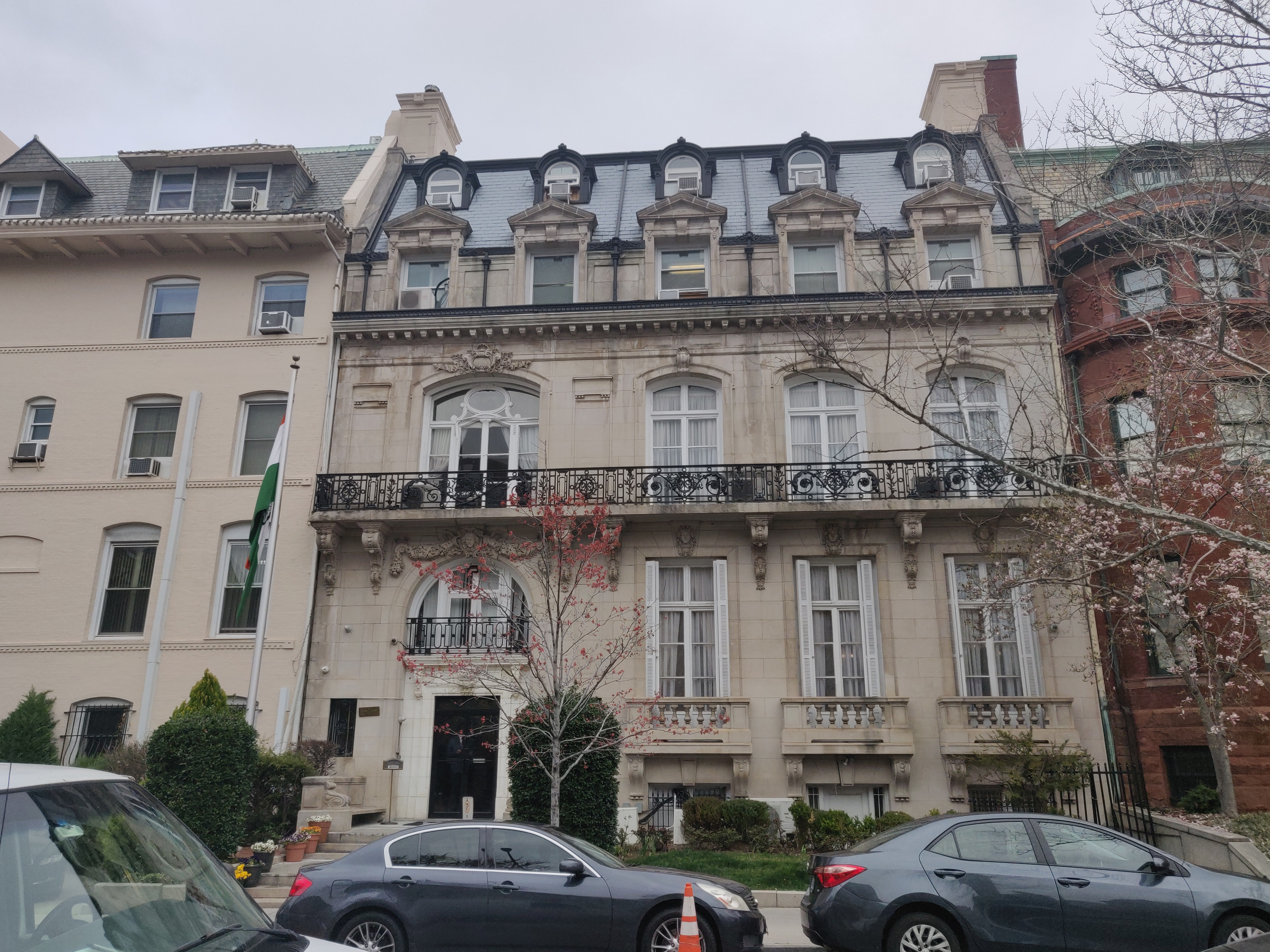
Embassy of India in Washington, D.C.

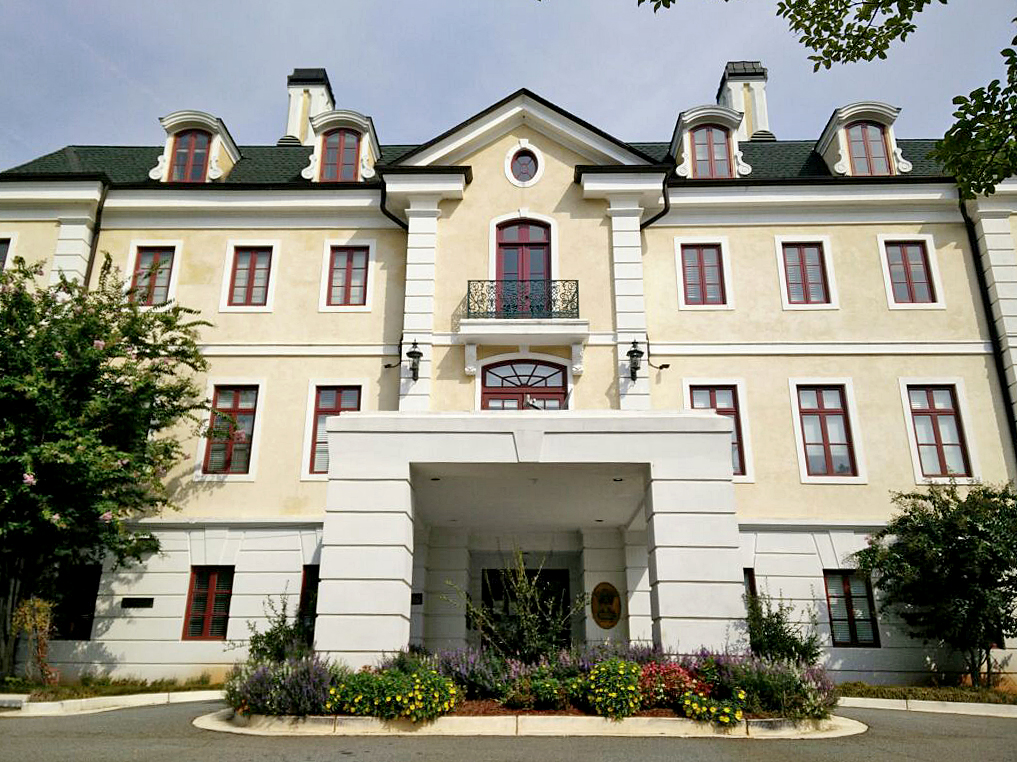
Consulate-General of India in Atlanta

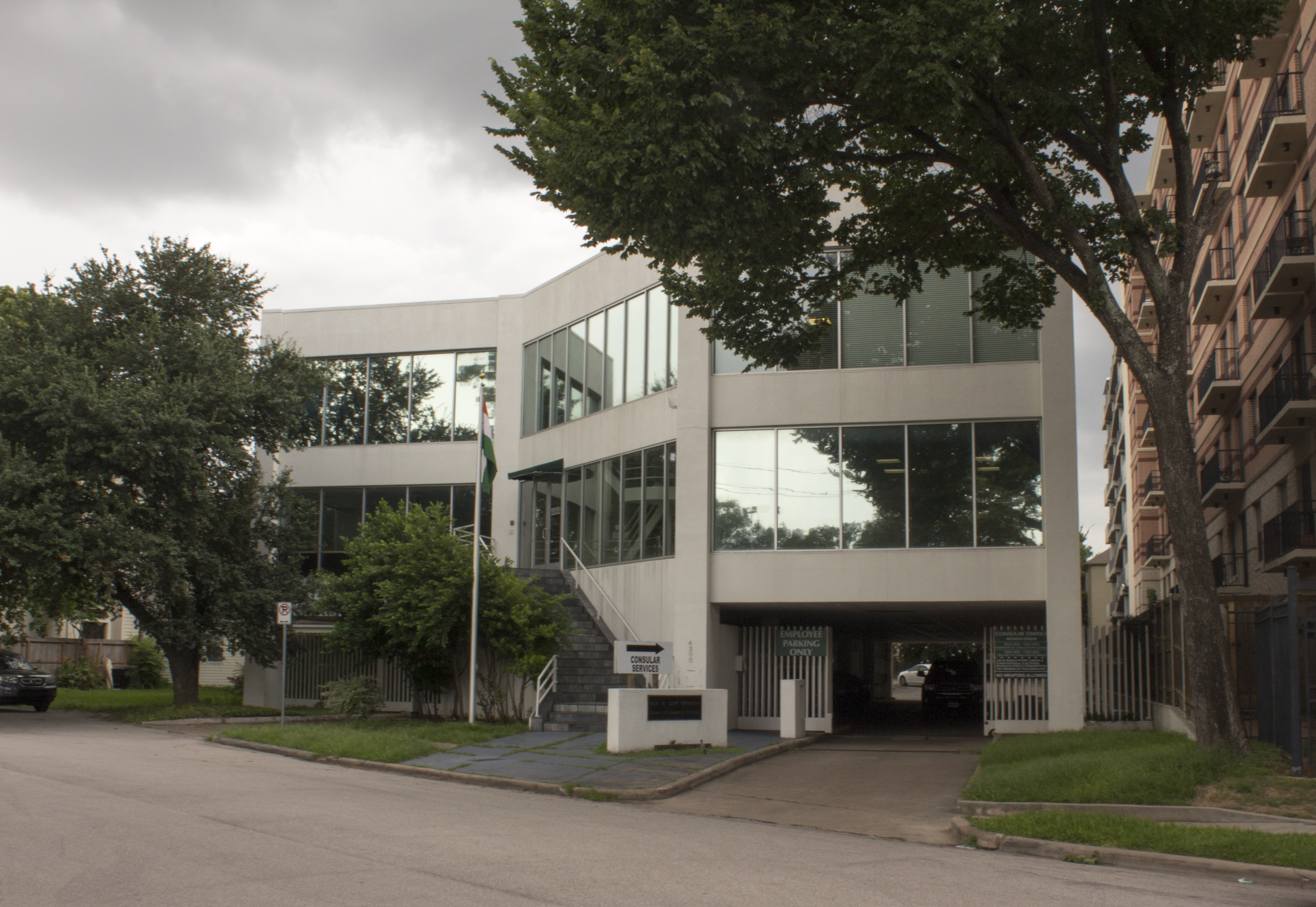
Consulate-General of India in Houston

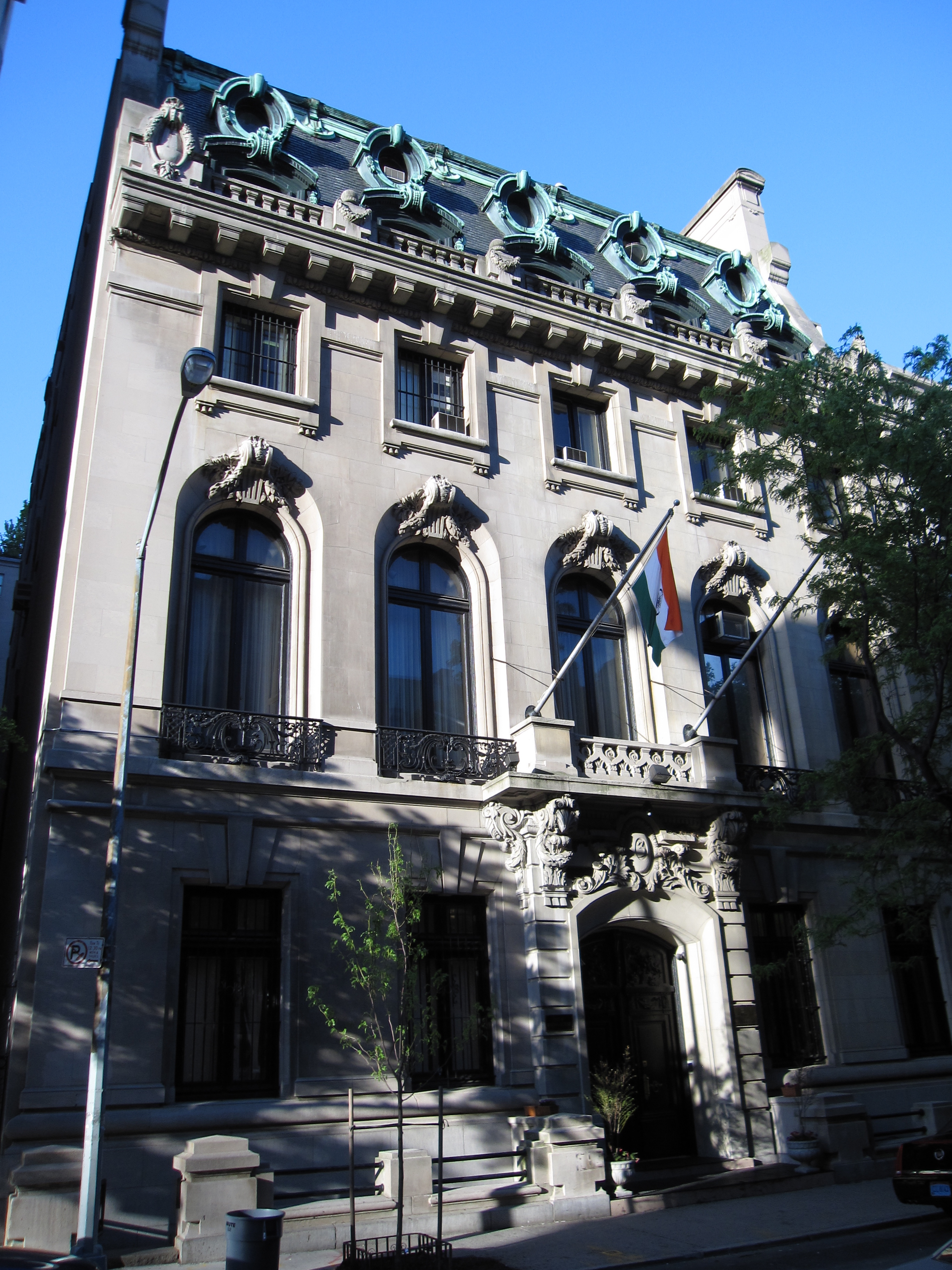
Consulate-General of India in New York City

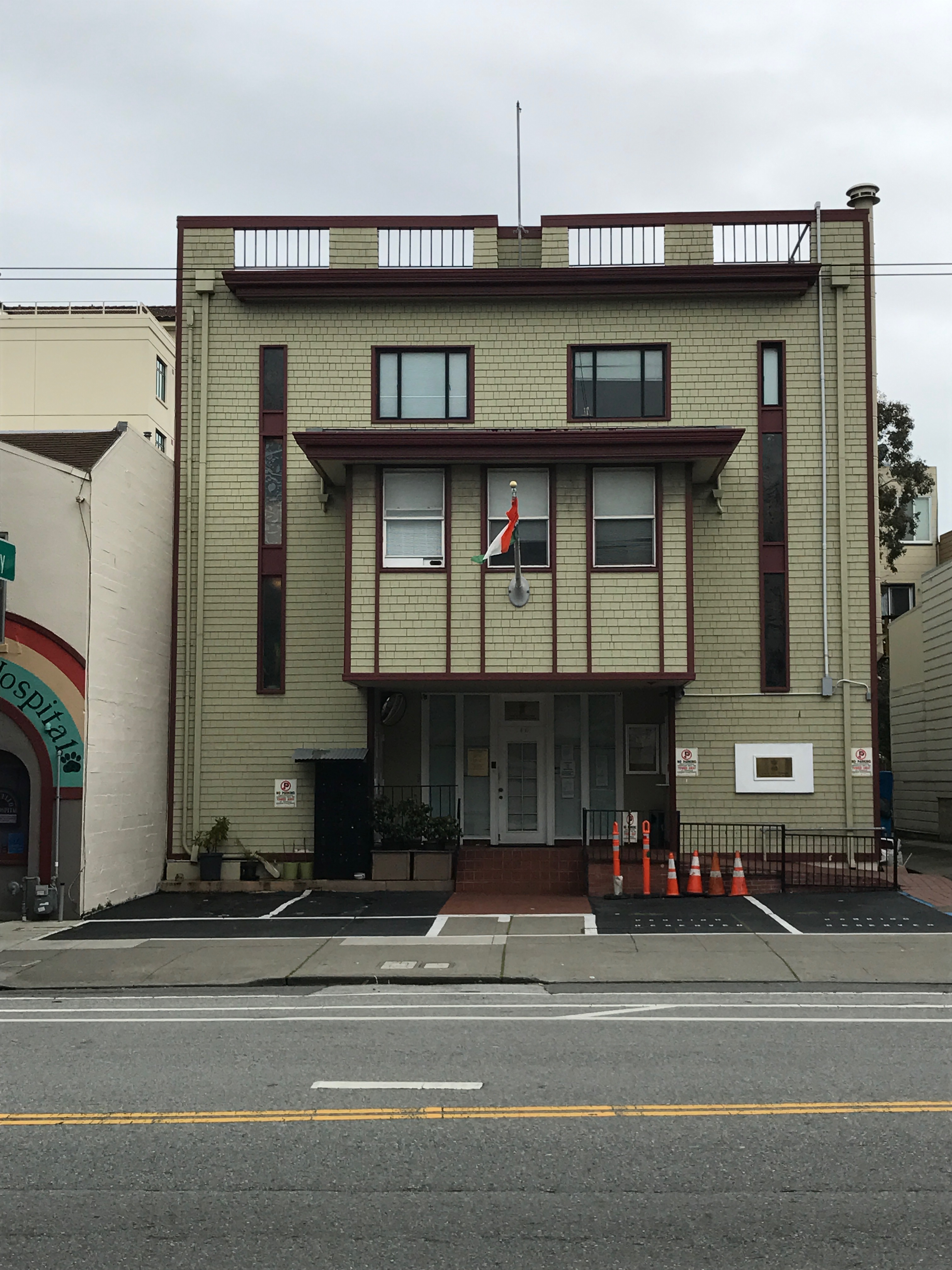
Consulate-General of India in San Francisco
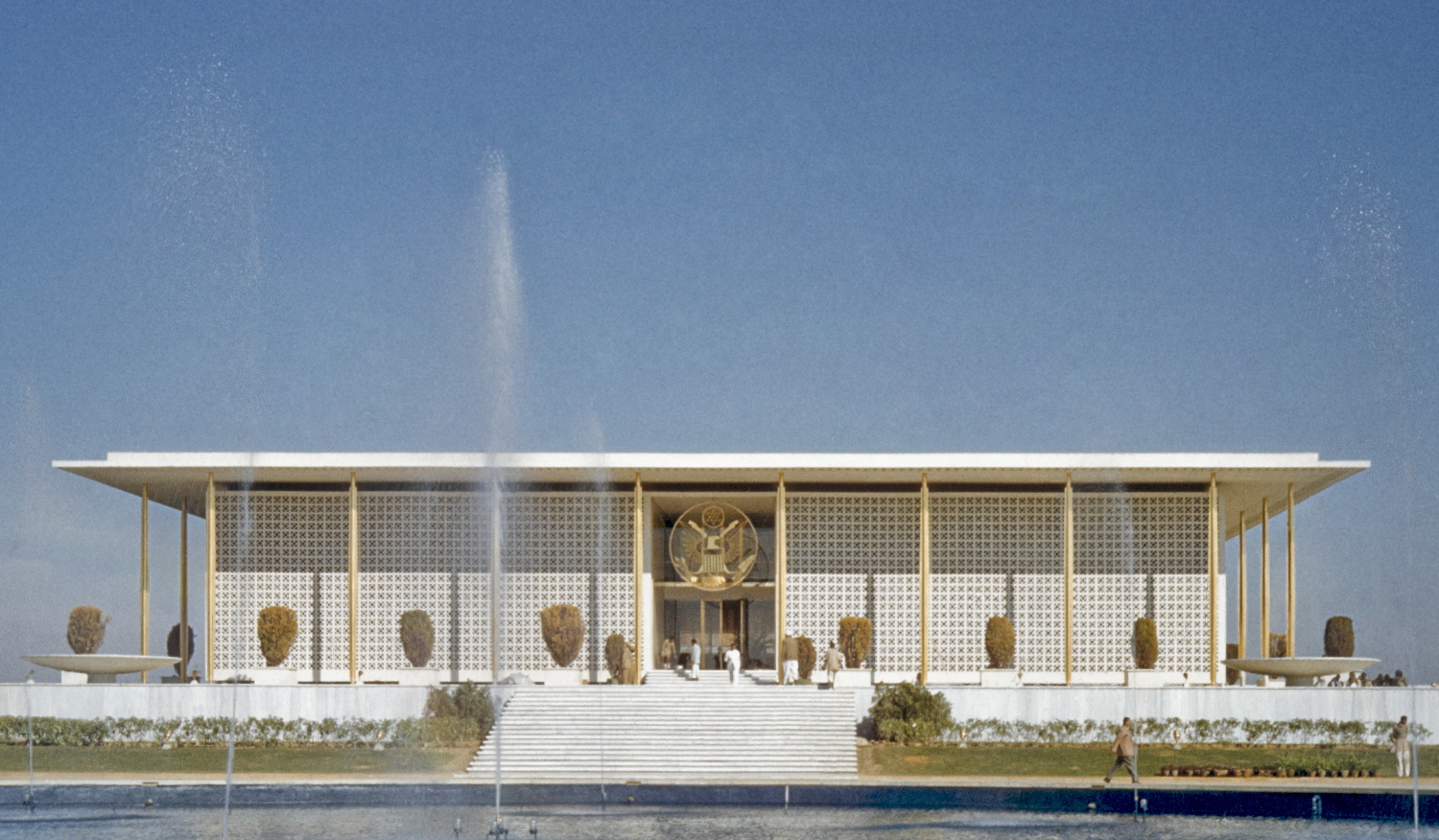
Embassy of the United States in New Delhi

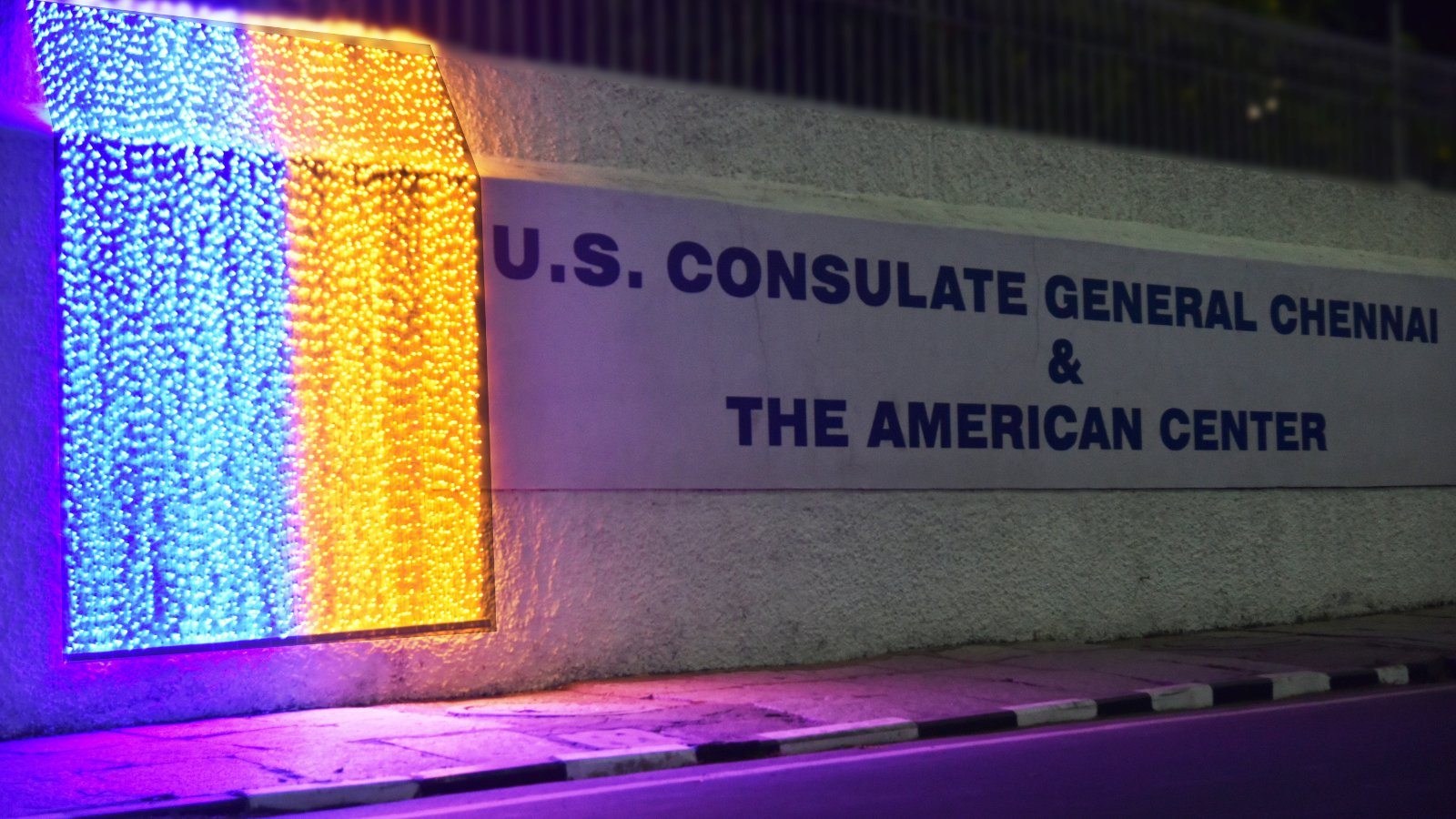
Consulate-General of the United States in Chennai

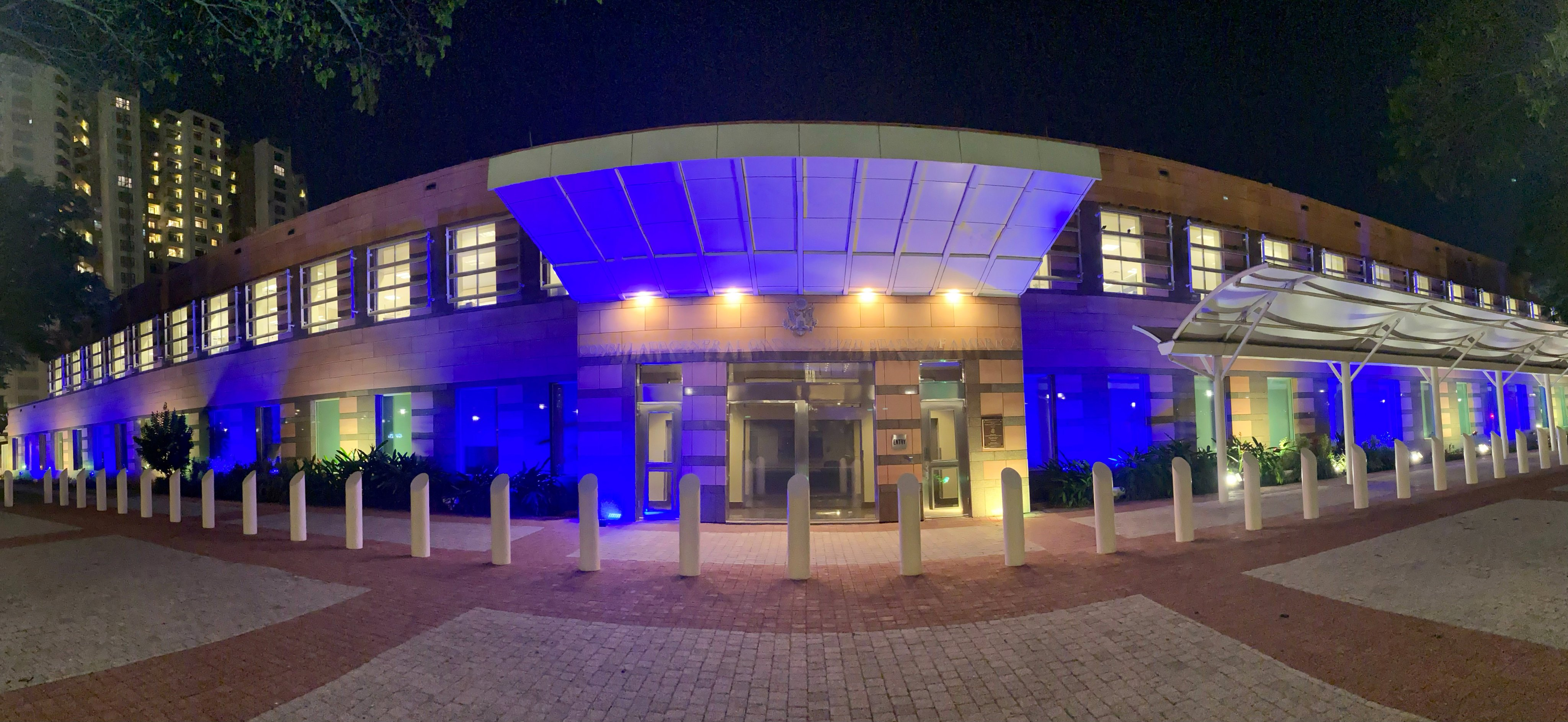
Consulate-General of the United States in Mumbai

== Head of state visits ==
List of US Presidents to visit India
	Name	Dates	Location
1	Dwight D. Eisenhower	December 9–14, 1959	New Delhi, Agra
2	Richard Nixon	July 31 – August 1, 1969	New Delhi
3	Jimmy Carter	January 1–3, 1978	New Delhi, Daulatpur Nasirabad (now Carterpuri)
4	Bill Clinton	March 19–25, 2000	New Delhi, Agra, Jaipur, Hyderabad, Mumbai
5	George W. Bush	March 1–3, 2006	New Delhi, Hyderabad
6	Barack Obama	November 6–9, 2010 January 25–27, 2015	Mumbai, New Delhi
7	Donald Trump	February 24–25, 2020	Ahmedabad, Agra, New Delhi
8	Joe Biden	September 8–10, 2023	New Delhi
9	Donald Trump	Mid 2027	New Delhi

== See also ==
Geostrategic

- Blue Team (U.S. politics)
- Free and Open Indo-Pacific
- India as an emerging superpower
- India–United States Civil Nuclear Agreement
- Malabar (naval exercise)
- Quadrilateral Security Dialogue
- String of Pearls (Indian Ocean)
- CIA activities in India

Cultural and peoples relations

- Sikhism in the United States
- Hinduism in the United States
- Americans in India
- Indian Americans
- Buddhism in the United States

Foreign relations

- Canada–India relations
- China–United States relations
- China containment policy
- India–European Union relations
- Pakistan–United States relations
