= List of exercises of the Indian Army =

The following is a list of military exercises of the Indian Army.

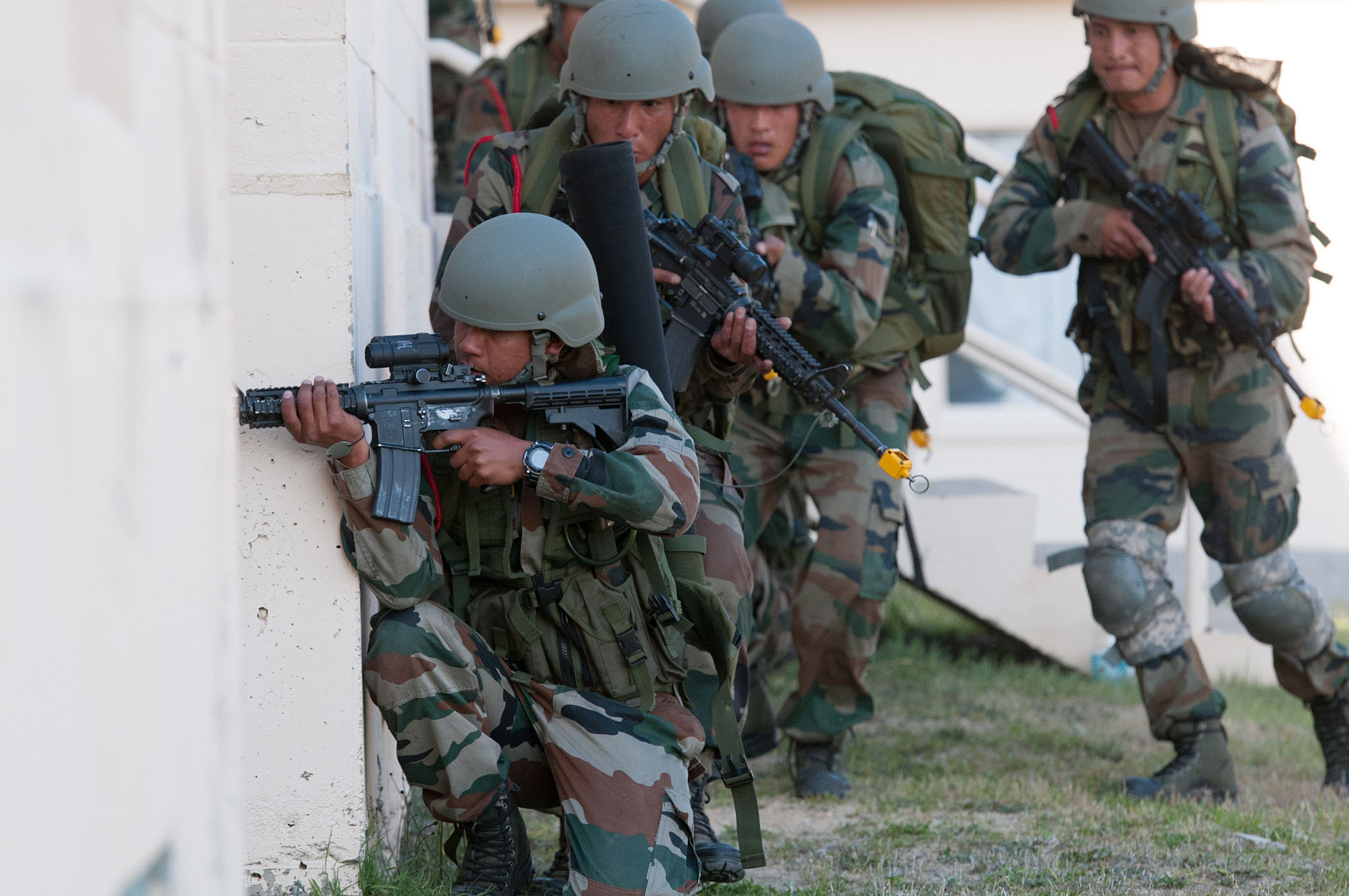
2nd Battalion, 5th Gurkha Rifles, 99th Mountain Brigade during Yudh Abyas 2013 at Fort Bragg

== List ==
Name	Participating Country	Units	Date	Location	References
1960
Lal Qila	India	Eastern Command HQ	17 March	Lucknow, India	
2002
Yudh Abyas	United States	Indian Special Forces; United States Special Forces	16 - 26 May	Agra, India	
2004
Nomadic Elephant I	Mongolia		October	Mongolia	
Yudh Abyas	United States		27 March - 17 April	Vairangte, India	
2005
Emerald Mercury	United Kingdom		11 - 22 March	Hyderabad, India	
Yudh Abhyas	United States	22 Maratha Light Infantry; 25 Infantry Division; 1 Guam National Guard	September - October	Vairangte, India	
Indra II	Russia		10 - 20 October	Agra, India	
Nomadic Elephant II	Mongolia		1 - 10 October	Vairangte, India	
2006
	Uzbekistan	Uzbekistan Special Forces	January		
Desert Strike	-		April	Rajasthan, India	
Yudh Abyas	United States	5 Gorkha Rifles; Garud Commando Force; 25 Infantry Division	6 - 23 September	Schofield barracks, United States	
Shatrujeet	United States	1 Rifle Company, 21 Punjab Regiment; Company, 2/4 Marine Expeditionary Unit	31 October - 2 November	Belgaum, India	
2007
Himalayan Warrior	United Kingdom	Parachute Regiment; Royal Marines	17 September - 11 October	Leh, India	
Yudh Abhyas	United States	5 Gorkha Rifles; C Company 3/ 21 Infantry Division	November	Chaubatia, India	
Hand in Hand I	China		19 - 27 December	Kunming, China	
Indra III	Russia			Pskov, Russia	
2008
Brazen Chariots	-		March	Rajasthan, India	
Ajeya Warrior	United Kingdom	16 Mechanized Regiment; 3 Mercian Regiment	29 August - 19 September	Salisbury Plain, United Kingdom	
Yudh Abhyas	United States	49th Infantry Brigade; 9 Mission Support Command, California Army National Guard, 40 Infantry Brigade Combat Team	24 October - November 5	Honolulu, United States	
Hand in Hand II	China	8 Maratha Light Infantry; 1 Company, Infantry Battalion, Chengdu Military Area Command	4 - 14 December	Belgaum, India	
2009
Hind Shakti	-	II Corps	3 - 6 May	Punjab, India	
Yudh Abhyas	United States	Mechanised Infantry Battalion; 2 Squadron, 14 Cavalry, 25 Stryker Brigade Combat Team	12 - 29 October	Babina, India	
Ekuverin	Maldives	16 Madras Regiment; 2 Parachute Regiment	18 - 30 October	Belgaum, India	
2010
Indra III	Russia		13 - 23 October	Ranikhet, India	
Yudh Abyas	United States	62 Infantry Division; 5 Parachute Regiment; 4 Brigade Combat Team (Airborne), 25 Infantry Division; 79 Infantry Brigade Combat Team (National Guard)	1 - 14 November	Joint Base Elmendorf–Richardson, United States	
2011
Surya Kiran I	Nepal			Vairangte, India	
Ajeya Warrior IV	United Kingdom	3 Bihar Regiment, 83 Infantry Brigade; B Company, 2 Battalion The Royal Welsh, 19 Light Brigade	20 July - 19 August	Salisbury Plain, United Kingdom	
Surya Kiran II	Nepal			Amlekhganj, Nepal	
Shakti I	France	2 Bihar Regiment, 99 Mountain Brigade; 13 Mountain Infantry Battalion	9 - 21 October	Chaubatia, India	
Sampriti I	Bangladesh			Assam, India	
Sudarshan Shakti	-	XXI Corps	28 November - 14 December	Rajasthan, India	
2012
Bold Kurukshetra	Singapore		March	Babina, India	
Surya Kiran III	Nepal		27 June		
Sampriti II	Bangladesh				
Garud Shakti	Indonesia	19 Madras Regiment, 21 Mountain Division; 13 Infantry Brigade	20 February -1 March	Vairangte, India	
Yudh Abhyas VII	United States	2 Mechanised Regiment; 2 Squadron 14 Cavalry, 25 Stryker Brigade Combat Team; 6 Engineer Battalion (Airborne), 2 Engineer Brigade	5 - 12 March	Jaisalmer, India	
Shoor Veer	-	South Western Command	April	Rajasthan, India	
Nomadic Elephant	Mongolia	Jat Regiment	August 2012	Belgaum, India	
Surya Kiran IV	Nepal				
Ekuverin	Maldives		12 - 25 November	Belgaum, India	
2013
Rudra Akrosh	-	South Western Command	January	Rajasthan, India	
Ajeya Warrior V	United Kingdom		4 April - 3 May	Belgaum, India	
Yudh Abhyas VIII	United States	2/5 Gurkha Rifles, 99th Mountain Brigade; 1st Brigade Combat Team, 82nd Airborne Division	3 - 17 May	Fort Bragg, United States	
Shakti II	France		9 - 20 September	Jodhpur, India	
Surya Kiran V	Nepal		23 September - 6 October	Pithoragarh, India	
Indra V	Russia		17 - 28 October	Jaisalmer, India	
Hand in Hand III	China		4 - 14 November	Chengdu, China	
2014
Surya Kiran VI	Nepal		5 - 19 March	Saljhandi, Nepal	
Sarvada Vijay	-		May	Rajasthan, India	
Surya Kiran VII	Nepal	Garud Division	18 - 31 August	Pithoragarh, India	
Yudh Abhyas X	United States		17 - 30 September	Ranikeht, India	
Ekuverin	Maldives		November	Maafilafushi, Maldives	
Mitra Shakti	Sri Lanka	Indian Special Forces; Sri Lankan Special Forces	3 - 23 November	Colombo, Sri Lanka	
Hand in Hand IV	China	13 Group Army	17 - 25 November	Pune, India	
2015
Nomadic Elephant X	Mongolia	84 Airborne Special Forces Battalion	23 January - 6 February	Gwalior, India	
Al Nagah-Ii I	Oman			Muscat, Oman	
Garud Shakti III	Indonesia	432 Battalion Kostrad Infantry	9 - 21 February	Vairengte, India	
Surya Kiran VIII	Nepal	Garud Division	23 February - 7 March	Salijhandi, Nepal	
Khanjar ||	Kyrgyzstan	Indian Special Forces; Scorpions - Kyrgyzstani Special Forces	March	Bishkek, Kyrgyzstan	
Brahmashira	-	II Corps	April	Suratgarh, India	
Ajeya Warrior VI	United Kingdom	Kumaon Regiment	13 - 28 June	Salisbury Plain, United Kingdom	
Ekuverin VI	Maldives	Bihar Regiment	31 August - 13 September	Trivandrum, India	
Yudh Abhyas X|	United States		9 - 23 September	Joint Base Lewis McChord, United States	
Sampriti V	Bangladesh			Binnaguri, India	
Mitra Shakti III	Sri Lanka		29 September - 12 October	Pune, India	
Hand in Hand V	China	Naga Regiment; Chengdu Military Area Command	12 - 22 October	Kunming, China	
Indra VII	Russia	Red Eagle Division; Independent Motorised Brigade	8 - 18 November	Bikaner, India	
Drad Sanklap	-	Southern Command	2 December	Rajasthan, India	
2016
Shakti III	France		6 - 16 January		
Sino-India Joint I	China		1 February	Chusul, China	
Surya Kiran IX	Nepal	Panchshul Brigade	8 - 21 February	Pithoragarh, India	
Lamitye VII	Seychelles	Indian Special Forces; Tazar (Special Forces Unit)	15 - 28 February	Port Victoria, Seychelles	
Force 18	ASEAN plus		2 - 8 March	Pune, India	
Garuda Shakti IV	Indonesia	Infantry Battalion from the Southern Command; 503 Airborne Battalion	11 - 23 March	Military Training Area, Magelang, Indonesia	
Khanjar III	Kyrgyzstan		March - April	Gwalior, India	
Shatrujeet	-	I Corps	16 April	Rajasthan, India	
Nomadic Elephant XI	Mongolia	Kumaon Regiment	25 April - 8 May	Mongolia	
Chakravyuh - II	-	Pivot Corps	6 May	Suratgarh, India	
Jalrahat	-		29 June	Guwahati, India	
Megh Prahar	-	I Corps	14 July	Mathura, India	
Maitree	Thailand		15 - 30 July	Krabi, Thailand	
Prabal Dostyk I	Kazakhstan	Special Operating Force's Unit	7 - 17 September	Karaganda, Kazakhstan	
Yudh Abhyas XII	United States	5th Infantry Battalion, 20 Infantry Regiment; 2 Stryker Brigade Combat Team, 7 Infantry Division	14 - 27 September	Chaubattia, India	
Indra VIII	Russia	Kumaon Regiment; 59th Motorized Infantry Brigade	22 September - 2 October	Vladivostok, Russia	
Sino-India Joint II	China		19 October		
Mitra Shakti	Sri Lanka	Rajuputana Rifles; Sinha Regiment	24 October - 6 November	Ambepussa, Sri Lanka	
Surya Kiran X	Nepal	Kumaon Regiment; Jabar Jung Battalion	31 October - 13 November	Saljhandi, Nepal	
Sampriti VI	Bangladesh	Mahar Regiment	5 - 18 November	Dhaka, Bangladesh	
Hand in Hand VI	China	13 Group Army	16 - 27 November	Pune, India	
Ekuverin VII	Maldives	Bihar Regiment	15 - 28 December	Laamu Atoll, Maldives	
2017
Khanjar IV	Kyrgyzstan	Indian Special Forces	20 February - 5 March	Kok Jhangak, Kyrgyzstan	
Surya Kiran XI	Nepal	Ekta Shakti Battalion (Punjab Regiment)/ 28 Punjab; Durga Baksh Battalion	7 - 20 March	Pithoragarh, India	
Al Nagah-Ii II	Oman		7 - 10 March	Bakloh, India	
Bold Kurukshetra	Singapore	31st Indian Armored Division; 3rd Singapore Division	4 - 21 March	Madhya Pradesh, India	
Nomadic Elephant XII	Mongolia	15 Jammu and Kashmir Rifles; 084 Special Forces Task Battalion	5 - 21 April	Vairengte, India	
Thar Shakti	-	X Corps	17 April - 17 May	Rajasthan, India	
Maitree	Thailand	Northern Command	3 - 17 July	Bakloh, Himachal Pradesh	
Surya Kiran XII	Nepal		3 -16 September	Saljhandi, Nepal	
Yudh Abhyas XIII	United States	2/11 Gorkha Rifles; 5th Battalion, 20th Infantry Regiment, 1-2 Stryker Brigade Combat Team	14 - 27 September	Joint Base Lewis-McChord, Washington	
Mitra Shakti	Sri Lanka	1 Mahar Regiment; Sinha Regiment	13 - 25 October	Pune, India	
Indra IX	Russia	5th Red Banner Army	19 - 29 October	249th Combined Army Range Sergeevisky, Russia	
Prabal Dostyk II	Kazakhstan	3/11 Gorkha Rifles	2 - 15 November	Bakloh, India	
Sampriti VII	Bangladesh	21 Mountain Division (Red Horns Division)	6 - 11 November	Umroi, Meghalaya	
Danx	-	50 Parachute Brigade	20 - 24 November	Andaman & Nicobar islands, India	
Imbax I	Myanmar	Red Horns Division	20 - 25 November	Umroi, Meghalaya	
Ajeya Warrior	United Kingdom	20 Rajputana Rifles; 1 Royal Anglian Regiment	1 - 14 December	Mahajan Field Firing Range, Rajasthan	
Ekuverin VIII	Maldives	8 Gorkha Rifles	14 - 27 December	Belgaum, India	
Hamesha Vijayee	-	Southern Command	16 - 22 December	Rajasthan	
2018
Vinbax I	Vietnam		30 January - 3 February	Jabalpur, India	
Vajra Prahar	United States	Special forces, Southern Command	January	Joint Base Lewis-McChord, United States	
Shakti IV	France	2/8 Gorkha Rifles; 2nd Marine Infantry Regiment	31 January - 5 February	Mailly-le-Camp. France	
Lamitye VIII	Seychelles	Southern Command	24 February - 4 March	Mahe, Seychelles	
Khanjar V	Kyrgyzstan	Indian Special Forces	16 - 29 March	Vairengte, India	
Harimau Shakti	Malaysia	4/Grenadiers; 1/Royal Ranger Regiment; Royal Malay Regiment	30 April - 13 May	Hulu Langat, Malaysia	
Vijay Prahar	-	South Western Command	April	Mahajan Field Firing Range, Rajasthan	
Surya Kiran XIII	Nepal		30 May - 12 June	Pithoragarh, India	
Maitree	Thailand	Kumaon Regiment	6 - 19 August	Chachoengsao, Thailand	
SCO Peace Mission	SCO	Rajput Regiment	20 - 29 August	Chelyabinsk, Russia	
Milex 2018	BIMSTEC		10 - September	Aundh Military Station, India	
Nomadic Elephant XII	Mongolia	17 Punjab Regiment; Unit 084	10 - 21 September	Five Hills Training Area, Ullanbaatar, Mongolia	
Prabal Dostyk III	Kazakhstan	5 Ladakh Scouts	10 - 22 September	Otar Military area, Kazakhstan	
Yudh Abhyas XIV	United States	Infantry battalion, 6 Mountain Division; 1st Battalion, 23 Infantry Regiment	16 - 29 September	Chaubatia, India	
Dharma Guardian I	Japan	6/1 Gorkha Rifles; 32 Infantry Regiment	1 - 14 November	Vairengte, India	
Indra X	Russia	Mechanized Infantry Regiment; 5th Army	18 - 28 November	Babina Military Station, India	
2019
Tsentr2019	Russia	22 Grenadiers	September	Russia, Orenburg Oblast, Donguz Ranges.	
Yudh Abhyas 2019	United States	Assam Regiment	September	JBLM	
Changthang Prahar	-	XIV Corps	September	Super high altitude areas of Eastern Ladakh	
HimVijay	-	XVII Corps, IV Corps; IAF	October	High Altitude Areas of Arunachal Pradesh along LAC	
Vajra Prahar	United States	United States Army Special Forces; Para SF	13-28 October	Joint Base Lewis–McChord	
Dharma Guardian 2019	Japan	Dogra Regiment; 34th Infantry Regiment, 1st Division of Japanese Ground Self Defence Forces (JGSDF)		Vairengte, Mizoram	
KazInd	Kazakhstan		1-10 September 2021	Kazakhstan	
SHINYUU Maitri	Japan	C-130J of IAF & C-130H of JASDF	October 17–23	Panagarh, West Bengal	
Sindhu Sudarshan	—	XXI Corps, IX Corps	20 October-5 December	Pokhran field firing rangePokhran	
Shakti 2019	France	21 The Sikh Regiment; French Army	1 November - 13 November	Mahajan Field Firing Range, Rajasthan	
Tiger Triumph	United States	Indian Army-19 Madras, 7 Guards.; Indian Navy-INS Jalashwa, INS Airavat & INS Sandhayak.; IAF-MI 17& Rapid Action Medical Team (RAMT); USMC-Third Marine Division; US Navy-USS Germantown,	13-21 November	Eastern Seaboard (Kakinada) & (Visakhapatnam)	
2020
Sampriti-IX	Bangladesh	20 Bihar Regiment; 42nd Bangladesh Infantry Regiment	03-16 February 2020	Umroi, Meghalaya	
2021
Yudh Abhyas	United States		8–21 February 2021	Suratgarh, Rajasthan	
Dustlik II	Uzbekistan		March	Ranikhet, Uttarakhand	
Khanjar	Kyrgyzstan	Indian Special Forces; Kyrgyz Special Forces	April 2021	Kyrgyzstan	
2022
Dustlik III	Uzbekistan	India: Personnel from a Battalion The Grenadiers	22 - 31 March	Yangiarik, Uzbekistan	
VINBAX	Vietnam	Vietnam People's Army	1 August	Chandimandir, Haryana	
Ex Vajra Prahar	United States	Indian Special Forces US Special Forces	28 August- 19 October	Bakloh, Himachal Pradesh	
Al Najah-IV	Oman	India: 18 Mechanised Infantry Battalion of the Indian Army and Oman: Royal Army of Oman contingent	1 - 14 August	Bikaner, Rajasthan	
Vostok	Multilateral	7/8 Gorkha Rifles	September 1 to 07	Eastern Military District of Russia	
Parvat Prahar	-	Indian Army's Strike One Corps	10 - 24 September	Ladakh	
Yudh Abhyas	United States	US Army soldiers of 2nd Brigade of the 11th Airborne Division and Indian Army soldiers from the Assam Regiment	16 November	Auli	
AustaHind I	Australia	India: Troops from a Battalion of the Dogra Regiment. Australia: Troops from the 13th Brigade of the 2nd Division.	28 November - 11 December	Mahajan Field Firing Range, Rajasthan	
2023
Dustlik IV	Uzbekistan		February	Pithoragarh, Uttarakhand	
Mitra Shakti IX	Sri Lanka		November	Pune, Maharashtra	
AustaHind II	Australia	India: 60 troops from a Battalion of the Gorkha Rifles along with 20 Air Force and one Navy personnel. Australia: 20 personnel each from the Air Force and Navy.	22 November - 6 December	Australia	
2024
Desert Cyclone I	United Arab Emirates	UAE: Zayed First Brigade India: 45 personnel from a Battalion of Mechanised Infantry Regiment	2 - 15 January	Mahajan Field Firing Range, Rajasthan	
Sada Tanseeq I	Saudi Arabia	Saudi Arabia: 45 personnel from Saudi Arabian Army India: 45 personnel from a Battalion of Brigade of the Guards	29 January - 10 February	Mahajan Field Firing Range, Rajasthan	
Dharma Guardian V	Japan	Japan: 40 personnel from 34 Infantry Regiment India: 40 personnel from Battalion from the Rajputana Rifles	25 February - 9 March	Mahajan Field Firing Range, Rajasthan	
Lamitiye X	Seychelles	Seychelles: 45 personnel from Seychelles People's Defence Force India: 45 personnel from Gorkha Rifles	18-27 March	Seychelles	
Dustlik V	Uzbekistan	Uzbekistan: 100 personnel from Uzbek Ground Forces and Uzbekistan Air Force India: 45 personnel from a Battalion of Jat Regiment and 15 from Indian Air Force	15 - 28 April	Termez, Uzbekistan	
Shakti VII	France	France: 90 personnel from 13th Demi-Brigade of the Foreign Legion India: 45 personnel from a Battalion of Rajput Regiment	13 - 26 May	Umroi, Meghalaya	
Maitree XIII	Thailand	Thailand: 76 personnel from 1st Battalion, 14 Infantry Regiment of 4 Division India: 76 personnel from a Battalion of Ladakh Scouts	1 - 15 July	Fort Vachiraprakan, Tak Province, Thailand	
Nomadic Elephant XVI	Mongolia	Mongolia: Personnel from 150 Quick Reaction Force Battalion India: 45 personnel from a Battalion of Sikkim Scouts	3 - 16 July	Umroi, Meghalaya	
Parvat Prahar	-	Indian Army's Strike One Corps	7 - 21 August	Ladakh	
Mitra Shakti X	Sri Lanka	Sri Lanka: Personnel from Gajaba Regiment India: 106 personnel from a Battalion from the Rajputana Rifles	12 - 24 August	Army Training School, Maduru Oya, Sri Lanka	
Yudh Abhyas	United States	600 soldiers from each side. Included artillery units equipped with M142 HIMARS, Pinaka MBRL, M777 howitzer, HAL Rudra, Boeing AH-64 Apache. Included a regiment from Rajput Regiment.	9 - 24 September	Mahajan Field Firing Range, Rajasthan	
Al Najah-V	Oman	India: 60 personnel from a Mechanised Infantry Battalion of the Indian Army. Oman: 60 personnel from Frontier Force of Royal Army of Oman.	13 - 26 September	Rabkoot Training Area, Salalah, Oman	
KAZIND VIII	Kazakhstan	India: 120 personnel from a battalion of the Kumaon Regiment of the Indian Army. Kazakhstan: Personnel from Kazakh Ground Forces and Kazakh Air Assault Forces.	30 September - 13 October	Surya Foreign Training Node, Auli, Uttarakhand	
Garud Shakti IX	Indonesia	India: 25 personnel from the Para (Special Forces) of the Indian Army. Indonesia: 40 personnel Kopassus of the Indonesian Army.	1 - 12 November	Cijantung, Jakarta, Indonesia	
Vajra Prahar XV	United States	India: 45 personnel from the Para (Special Forces) of the Indian Army. USA: 45 personnel Green Berets of the US Army.	2 - 22 November	Orchard Combat Training Centre, Idaho, USA	
VINBAX 24	Vietnam	India: 47 personnel from a regiment of Indian Army Corps of Engineers. Vietnam: 47 personnel from People's Army of Vietnam.	4 - 23 November	Ambala and Chandimandir, Haryana, India	
Agni Warrior	Singapore	India: 114 personnel from Regiment of Artillery. Singapore: 182 personnel from Singapore Artillery.	28 - 30 November	Devlali Field Firing Range, Maharashtra, India	
AustaHind III	Australia	India: 140 troops, mostly from a Battalion of the Dogra Regiment along with 14 Air Force personnel. Australia: 120 personnel from the 13th Light Horse Regiment of the 10th Brigade of the 2nd Division.	13 - 26 October	Foreign Training Node, Pune, Maharashtra, India	
CINBAX	Cambodia	India: 20 personnel from Infantry Brigade. Cambodia: 20 personnel.	1 - 8 December	Foreign Training Node, Pune, Maharashtra, India	
Harimaru Shakti IV	Malaysia	India: 78 personnel from Mahar Regiment. Malaysia: 123 personnel from Royal Malay Regiment.	2 - 15 December	Bentong camp, Pahang district, Malaysia	
2025
Tiger Triumph 2025	United States	Multiple units deployed as part of tri-service amphibious exercise	1 - 7 April	Kakinada, Andhra Pradesh India	
Nomadic Elephant XV	Mongolia	India: 45 personnel from Arunachal Scouts. Malaysia: 45 personnel from 150 Special Forces unit.	31 May - 13 June	Ulaanbaatar, Mongolia	
Khaan Quest	Mongolia	Multinational exercise India: 45 personnel from a battalion of Kumaon Regiment.	14 - 28 June	Ulaanbaatar, Mongolia	
Shakti VIII	France	India: 90 personnel from a Battalion of Jammu and Kashmir Rifles France: 90 personnel from 13th Demi-Brigade of the Foreign Legion	18 June - 1 July	Camp Larzac, La Cavalerie, France	
Achook Prahaar	—	III Corps; Indo-Tibetan Border Police	25 - 28 August	Central Arunachal Pradesh	
Maitree XIV	Thailand	Thailand: 53 personnel from 1st Infantry Battalion, 14th Infantry Brigade India: 120 personnel from a Battalion of Madras Regiment	1 - 14 September	Joint Training Node (JTN), Umroi, Meghalaya	
Yudh Abhyas	United States	USA: 1st Battalion, 5th Infantry Regiment ('Bobcat'), 1st Infantry Brigade Combat Team ('Arctic Wolves'), 11th Airborne Division India: 400 troops from all arms and services and led by the Madras Regiment	1 - 14 September	Fort Wainwright, Alaska	
Zapad 2025	Multinational (Russia)	India: 65 member contingent from the Indian Armed Forces including 57 personnel from the Army led by a battalion from the Kumaon Regiment and seven and one personnel from the Air Force and the Navy, respectively.	10 - 16 September	Mulino Training Ground, Nizhniy, Russia	
Amogh Fury	—	South Western Command		Mahajan Field Firing Range, Rajasthan	
Agni Drishti (under Exercise Trishul)	—	Agnibaaz Division, XXI Corps, Southern Command	19 October		
Trinetra (under Exercise Trishul)	—	XXI Corps, Southern Command	21 October		
AustaHind IV	Australia	India: 120 troops from all arms and services and led by a Battalion of the 1st Gorkha Rifles	13 - 26 October	Irwin Barracks, Perth, Australia	
Maru Jwala (under Exercise Trishul)	—	Shahbaaz Division, XXI Corps, Southern Command	11 November	Jaisalmer, Rajasthan	
Akhand Prahaar (under Exercise Trishul)	—	Battle Axe Division, XII Corps, Southern Command	12 November	Jaisalmer, Rajasthan	
Ajeya Warrior VIII	United Kingdom	UK: 120 troops from the 2 Royal Gurkha Rifles India: 120 troops from the Sikh Regiment.	17 - 30 November	Mahajan Field Firing Range, Rajasthan	
Ram Prahar	—	Ram Division, II Corps, Western Command and Indian Air Force	22 October - 22 November	Uttarakhand	
Surya Kiran	Nepal	Nepal: 334 troops from the Devi Datta Regiment India: 334 troops from the Assam Regiment.	25 November - 8 December	Pithoragarh, Uttarakhand	
Ekuverin XIV	Maldives	Maldives: 45 personnel from the Maldives National Defence Force (MNDF) India: 45 personnel from a battalion from the Garhwal Rifles	2 - 15 December	Thiruvananthapuram, Kerala	
Garuda Shakti X	Indonesia	Indonesia: Troops from the Indonesian Special Forces. India: Troops from the Para (Special Forces)	3 - 12 December	Special Forces Training School, Bakloh, Himachal Pradesh	
Harimau Shakti V	Malaysia	Malaysia: Troops from the 25th Battalion, Royal Malay Regiment. India: Troops from the Dogra Regiment	5 - 18 December	Mahajan Field Firing Range, Rajasthan	
Desert Cyclone II	United Arab Emirates	UAE: 45 personnel from 53 Mechanised Infantry Battalion India: 45 personnel from Battalion from the Mechanised Infantry Regiment	18 - 30 December	Abu Dhabi, UAE	
2026
Exercise Kharga Shakti-26	—	Kharga Corps, Western Command with support from Indian Air Force	10 - 24 February		
Dharma Guardian VII	Japan	Japan: 120 personnel from 32 Infantry Regiment India: 120 personnel from Battalion from the Ladakh Scouts	24 February - 9 March	Foreign Training Node, Chaubattia, Uttarakhand	
Vajra Prahar	United States	India: 45 personnel from the Para SF of the Indian Army. USA: 12 personnel Green Berets of the US Army.	24 February - 16 March	Special Forces Training School, Bakloh, Himachal Pradesh	
LAMITIYE 2026	Seychelles	India: Personnel from the Assam Regiment of the Indian Army, INS Trikand (F51) of the Indian Navy and a C-130J of the Indian Air Force.	9 - 20 March	Seychelles Defence Academy, Seychelles	
Cyclone IV India–Egypt Joint Special Forces Exercise	Egypt	Egypt: Personnel from the El Saa'qa Forces (or the Airborne Forces) of the Egyptian Army. India: 25 personnel from the Para SF of the Indian Army.	9 - 17 April	Thunderbolt School, Anshas, Egypt	
Dustlik VII	Uzbekistan	Uzbekistan: 60 personnel from the Uzbek Army and the Air Force India: 45 personnel from the Indian Army, majorly from a Battalion of the Mahar Regiment; 15 personnel from the Indian Air Force	12 - 25 April	Gurumsaray Field Training Area, Namangam, Uzbekistan	
Maitree XV	Thailand	Thailand: 85 personnel 3rd Battalion, 25th Infantry Brigade, 5th Division. India: 85 personnel from the Indian Army, majorly from the 9 Gorkha Rifles.	18–31 August	Vibhavadi Rangsit Camp, Surat Thani, Thailand	
Yudh Abhyas	United States	USA: 600 troops from 1st Infantry Brigade Combat Team ('Arctic Wolves'), 11th Airborne Division (CO, 1st Infantry Brigade Combat Team: Colonel Benjamin Jackman) India: 600 troops from an Integrated Battle Group, 14 RAPID, II Corps (CO, 14 RAPID: Major General Amaresh Gunjan)	15–28 September	Auli Foreign Training Node, Uttarakhand Mahajan Field Firing Range, Rajasthan	
Mountain Gurdian	United Arab Emirates	UAE: 46 troops from a Mountain Infantry Battalion. India: 46 troops from a Bhairav Battalion.	5–18 October	Chaubatia Foreign Training Node, Uttarakhand	
Garuda Shakti XI	Indonesia	Indonesia: Troops from the Indonesian Special Forces. India: Troops from the Para (Special Forces)	27 October–6 November	Banyuwangi, Indonesia	

== See also ==
- List of exercises of the Indian Air Force
- List of Indian Naval deployments
- Exercise TROPEX
