= Cold Start (military doctrine) =

Military doctrine of India

Cold Start is a military doctrine that was developed by the Indian Armed Forces for use in a possible war with Pakistan. It involves the various branches of India's military conducting offensive operations as part of unified battlegroups. The doctrine is intended to allow India's conventional forces to perform holding attacks to prevent a nuclear retaliation from Pakistan in case of a conflict. The first Integrated Battle Group has been structured as of August 2019.

== Origins ==
India's defence strategy from 1974 was, in the words of former Defence Minister George Fernandes, "a non-aggressive, non-provocative defense policy", centred on "holding corps" to halt hostile advances. In response to the terrorist attack on the Indian Parliament in 2001, India initiated a full mobilisation. Taking almost a month, the slow mobilisation demonstrated the weakness of India's policy. The long mobilisation time resulted in sufficient international pressure to prevent India from conducting a retaliatory strike.

=== Sundarji Doctrine (1981–2004) ===
The Sundarji Doctrine was made up of seven defensive "holding corps" of the Indian Army and deployed near the Pakistani border. Possessing limited offensive power, the holding corps' primary responsibility was to check a Pakistani advance. India's offensive potency was derived from the "strike corps", which were made up of a mechanised infantry and extensive artillery support. "Unlike the holding corps that was deployed close to the border", argues Walter Ladwig of the University of Oxford, "the strike corps was based in central India, a significant distance from the international border. In a war, after the holding corps halted a Pakistani attack, the strike corps would counterattack, penetrating deep into Pakistani territory to destroy the Pakistan Army's own strike corps through 'deep sledgehammer blows' in a high-intensity battle of attrition".

However, the limitation of the Sundarji doctrine was exposed on 13 December 2001, when five Pakistani terrorists attacked the Indian Parliament. Twelve people, including the five gunmen, were killed and 22 were injured. India suspected Pakistan-based militant groups were behind the attack because just two months earlier, a similar assault had been carried out by the Jaish-e-Mohammad on the Kashmir State Assembly. India received credible evidence that militant groups Lashkar-e-Taiba and Jaish-e-Mohammad were behind the attack, prompting India to initiate Operation Parakram, the largest activation of its forces since the 1971 Bangladesh Liberation War.

It took the Indian strike corps three weeks to get to the international border. During that time, Pakistan was able to counter-mobilise and allow for intervening powers, the United States in particular, to become intermediaries to the conflict. Urging India to restrain, the American Ambassador to India, Robert Blackwill, urged India to wait until President Pervez Musharraf delivered a speech that would address the crisis. Musharraf's speech was quick to denounce terrorism generally, specifically militant groups operating in Kashmir, and promised a crackdown. "As a result of Musharraf's declaration, by the time the [Indian] strike corps reached the border region, India's political justification for military action had been significantly reduced," Walter C. Ladwig maintained.

Indian military strategists came to the conclusion that the Sundarji Doctrine was flawed. It was too inflexible to respond to terrorist attacks or other indirect challenges for three reasons:

- The strike corps was too big and too far away from the international border, making it difficult to deploy in a timely fashion.
- The long duration needed to mobilise the strike corps prevented strategic surprise, allowing Pakistan plenty of time to counter-mobilise.
- The holding corps' lack of offensive power along the international border prevented it from engaging in significant offensives.

=== Doctrine development ===
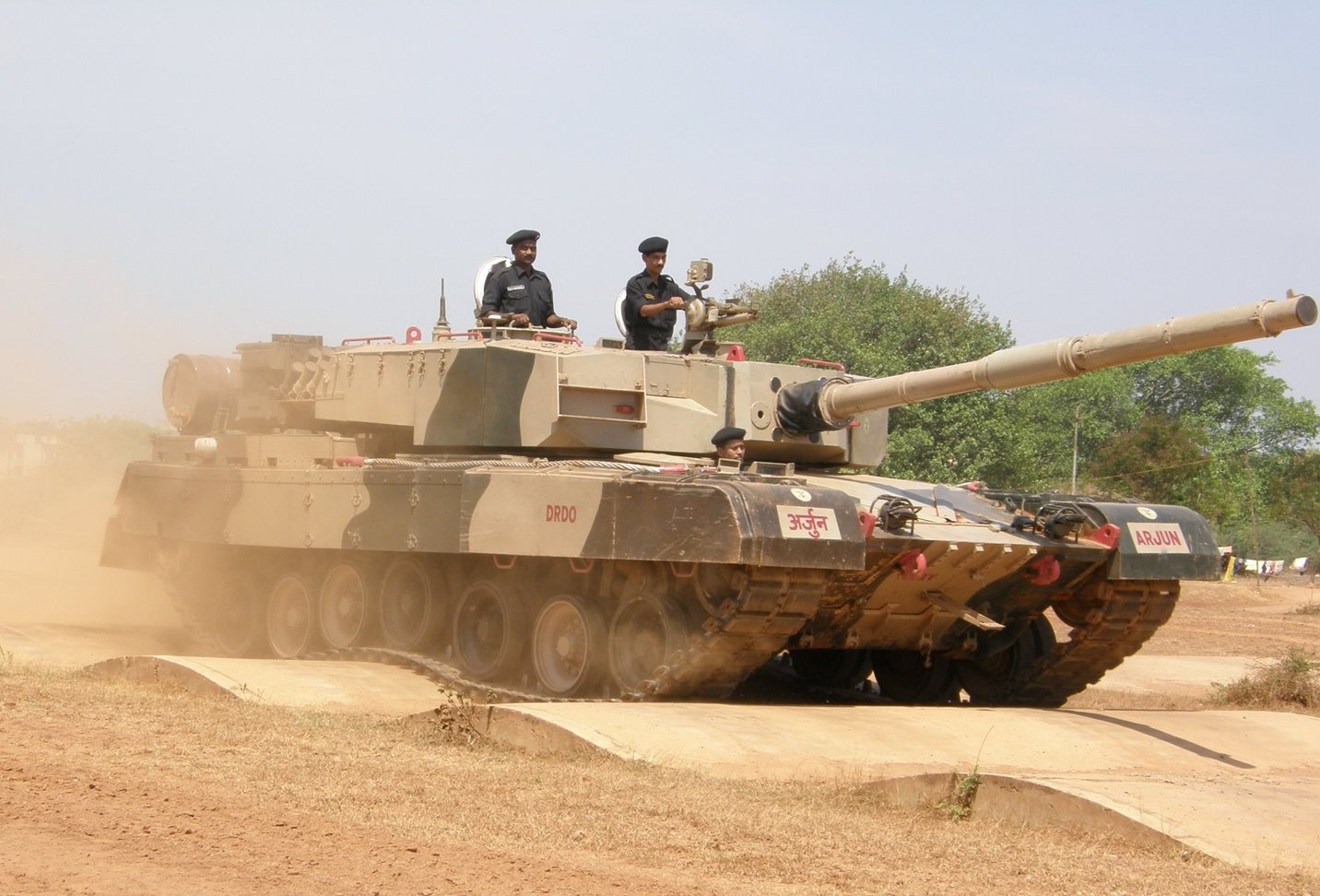
Arjun MBT conducting driving test on sand berms.

The development of the doctrine represented a significant change in Indian defence planning. Exercises aimed at reducing mobilisation time and improved network-centric warfare capabilities have contributed to the development of the doctrine. Despite its advances, the doctrine remains in the experimental stage.

Drawing on the experience of the 1967 Six-Day War as well as the Indo-Pakistani War of 1971, Indian defence planners envisioned a new doctrine that would involve limited, rapid armoured thrusts, with infantry and necessary air support.

As per Cold Start promulgation, offensive operations could begin within 48 hours after orders had been issued. Such a limited response time would enable Indian forces to surprise their Pakistani counterparts. Operations would involve armoured spearheads, launched from forward positions in Punjab and Rajasthan.

The plan emphasises speed and overwhelming firepower: armored formations and accompanying infantry would advance into eastern Pakistan, with limited goals in terms of distance and in terms of duration. The plan reportedly has a significant air support component. From the Indian perspective, the plan has the added virtue of accentuating Pakistani discomfiture and angst, which theoretically has some deterrent value.

== India's stance ==
India denies the Cold Start strategy. Quoting the Indian Army chief: "There is nothing called 'Cold Start'. As part of our overall strategy we have a number of contingencies and options, depending on what the aggressor does. In the recent years, we have been improving our systems with respect to mobilization, but our basic military posture is defensive".

In January 2011, while speaking to the media in the run-up to Army Day, Army chief General VK Singh came closer than any other government official in describing the widely speculated Indian war doctrine, popularly referred to as Cold Start: "There is nothing like Cold Start. But we have a 'proactive strategy' which takes steps in a proactive manner so that we can achieve what our doctrines and strategies".

Former Indian Defence Minister Jaswant Singh has denied the existence of the doctrine: "There is no Cold Start doctrine. No such thing. It was an off-the-cuff remark from a former chief of staff. I have been defense minister of the country. I should know".

Despite such assertions, in recent years, the Indian Army has conducted a series of major combat exercises, including the 2018 'Brahmashira' exercise by the 2 'Kharga' Strike Corps in Rajasthan, to practice "swift multiple offensives deep into enemy territory" under its "Pro-Active Conventional War Strategy".

On 6 January 2017, Army Chief General Bipin Rawat acknowledged the existence of this doctrine.

== Pakistan's response ==
The Chairman Joint Chiefs of Staff Committee of the Pakistani military declared 2010 the "Year of Training" and conducted a large-scale joint-military exercise, Azm-e-Nau–III, which focused on offensive defence against Cold Start. The military also tested the Nasr, a nuclear-capable tactical ballistic missile from the family of Hatf-IX missiles with a purported range of 60 km, a high accuracy and a shoot-and-scoot delivery system. The Institute for Defence Studies and Analyses stated that the development of the Nasr indicates that Pakistan views Cold Start with concern and that the missile was meant to deter India's implementation of the doctrine. It added that the net result would be "further nuclear impact(s) on India's territory".

== Validation ==
In May 2011, India launched Operation Vijayee Bhava ("Be Victorious"), a defence exercise involving 50,000 troops in Bikaner and Suratgarh near the border with Pakistan to boost the synergy between the various branches of the armed forces.

The main objective of the operation was to cut down the mobilisation time of the military, which took 27 days to mobilise during Operation Parakram. The Indian Army confirmed that the exercise was successful by reducing mobilisation time drastically to 48 hours.

In July 2011, India tested the Prahaar, a new solid-fuel tactical ballistic missile with a range of 150 km designed to provide invading Indian Army battle groups with lethal fire support.

Later that year, the Indian Army conducted its largest war games in the last two decades, Operation Sudarshan Shakti, under the Southern Command Headquarters, to revalidate its Cold Start doctrine. The desert exercise was based on the Integrated Theatre Battle concept, with various defence wings and military elements being required to participating in a single cohesive format during war.

The focus of Sudarshan Shakti was to practice synergy and integration between ground and air forces. Nearly 60,000 troops and 500 armoured vehicles, including T-72, T-90 and Arjun main battle tanks, carried out simulated assaults on their objectives, with support from artillery and the Indian Air Force.

The Indian military has also tested newly inducted radars, unmanned aerial vehicles, surveillance systems, precision guided bombs, missiles, space-based assets and real-time data-sharing between elements.

== Criticism ==
The Cold Start doctrine has invited criticism from Pakistani media and former generals. They claim that although the doctrine was designed to punish Pakistan in a limited manner without triggering nuclear retaliation, the Indian Army cannot be sure if Pakistan's leadership will actually refrain from such a response.

Criticism of the doctrine by Timothy J. Roemer, US Ambassador to India from 2009 to 2011, was revealed in a leaked cable. Roemer gave a detailed explanation of the doctrine as well as several facts that he believed raised questions about the actual application of doctrine. He raised questions about India's willingness to pursue the option, including the decision not to implement the doctrine after the deadly 2008 Mumbai attacks. Some of the claims that he made were that India would likely encounter "mixed results", that Cold Start is "a mixture of myth and reality" and that "the value of the doctrine to the GOI (Government of India) may lie more in the plan’s existence than in any real world application".

Walter Ladwig has suggested that a host of factors, including the terrain, the favorable deployment of Pakistani forces, and a lack of strategic surprise in the most likely conflict scenarios, would mitigate whatever mobilization advantages India may be gaining by its experimentation with Cold Start.

== 2008 Mumbai terrorist attacks ==
By intelligence intercepts and analysis carried out during the 2008 Mumbai attacks, Indian planners had assessed that the ongoing attack was likely a deliberate attempt by the terrorist organisation Lashkar-e-Taiba to provoke an Indian military strike on Pakistan, the objective being to entice other Islamist Pakistani militant groups that were engaged in armed conflict with the Pakistani state to redirect their attacks away from the Pakistani state and instead unify against an external threat, India. Consequently, to defeat the strategic goals of the Pakistani planners of the Mumbai massacre, India decided to hold off launching a punitive military strike on Pakistan. That assessment was later verified by interrogations and court testimony of one of the planners of the massacre, David Headley (half-Pakistani, half-American), while he was in custody of US and Indian authorities.

== Impact ==
In a manner similar to the way that the US Strategic Defense Initiative impacted the economy of the Soviet Union during the Cold War, the threat of the Cold Start doctrine and the increase in the Indian defence budget from $24 billion to $40 billion between 2007 and 2009 both apparently prompted the Pakistan government to increase its defence budget sharply to 32% of their federal government's net revenue receipts, further increasing the strain on that country's already-tenuous economy. In 2009, financial constraints on budget and the effects on national economy made the Pakistani government officials to begin working on the database program that it called "Threat Matrix", which was revealed in 2013 during a press conference.

== Further development ==
In November 2025, the Indian Armed Forces undertook the Tri Service Exercise (TSE) Trishul. The broader set of exercises involved Exercise Akhand Prahaar between the Indian Army and Air Force. During these exercises, the newer Rudra Brigade under the Konark Corps of the Southern Command was operationally validated. With the operationalisation of these brigades, the Army reportedly plans to upgrade its Cold Start military doctrine to "Cold Strike Doctrine". The term was coined by a retired Army officer, Lieutenant General A B Shivane and later used by the commanding officer of Southern Command, Lieutenant General Dhiraj Seth.

== See also ==
- Indian Armed Forces
- Nuclear Command Authority (India)
- Indo-Pakistani wars and conflicts

== Sources ==
- A Cold Start for Hot Wars? The Indian Army’s New Limited War Doctrine by Walter C. Ladwig III
- Indian Military Modernization and Conventional Deterrence in South Asia by Walter C. Ladwig III
- How India’s Cold Start is making the world a safer place
- CSD: Clear and Present Danger by Muhammad Ali Baig
