= Counter-Insurgency and Jungle Warfare School =

Warfare School, Indian Army

Coordinates: 24°30′00″N 92°45′50″E

Counter Insurgency and Jungle Warfare School
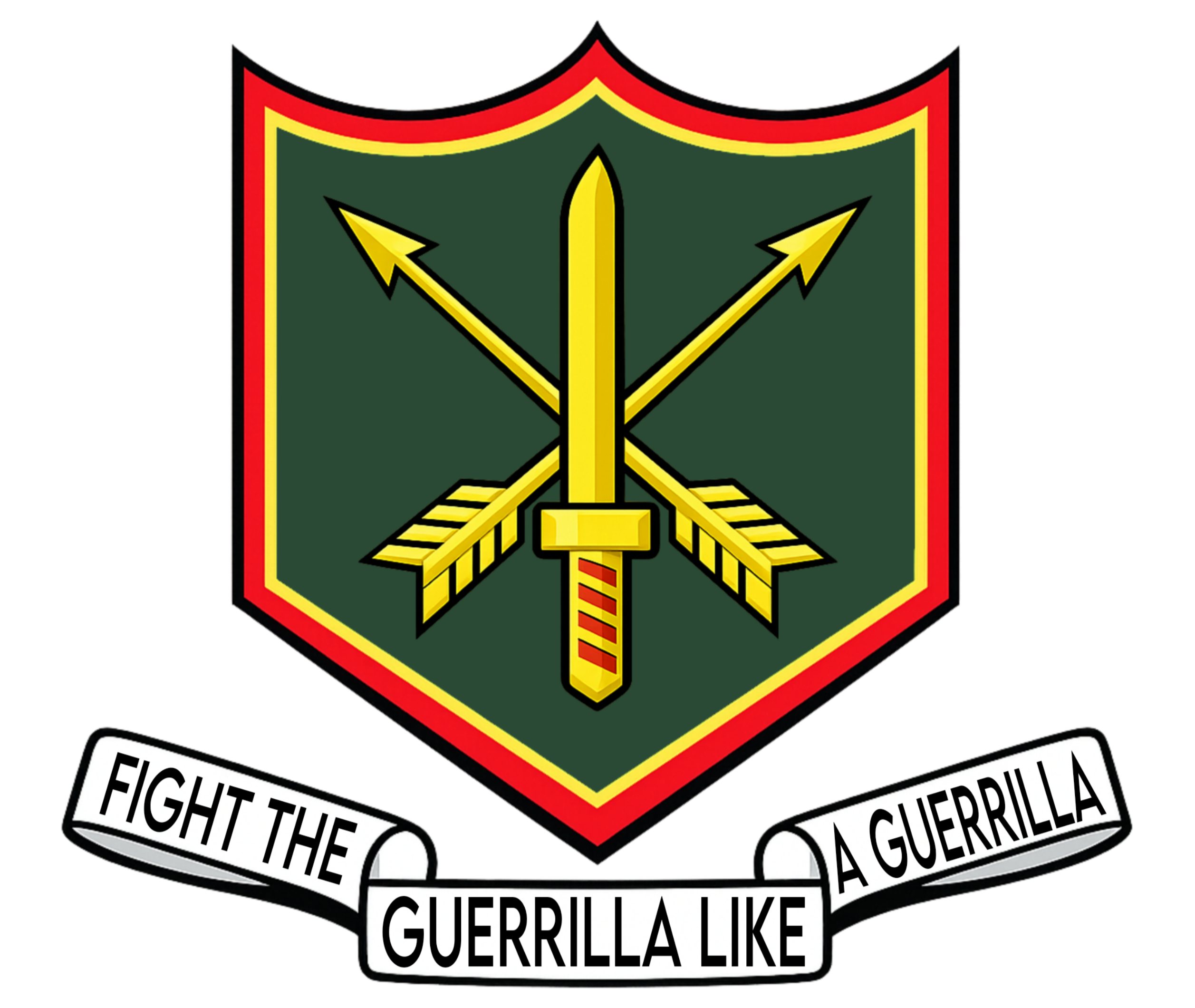
- Insignia of the CIJW School
- Motto: Fight the guerrilla like a guerrilla
- Type: Military Academy
- Established: 1967; 59 years ago
- Commandant: Maj Gen Kulvir Singh, SM**
- Location: Vairengte, Mizoram, India

The Counter Insurgency and Jungle Warfare School (CIJWS) in Vairengte, Mizoram, India is a training and research establishment of the Indian Army, which specialises in unconventional warfare especially counter insurgency and guerrilla warfare. CIJWS is a category 'A' training establishment and one of the premier counter insurgency training institutions in the world.

The current Commandant of the Counter Insurgency and Jungle Warfare School, Vairengte is Major General Kulvir Singh.

== History ==
The idea to set up the Jungle Warfare School was conceived by former COAS Field Marshal Sam Manekshaw sometime in 1967. The School was raised by Lt Col (Later Lt General) Mathew Thomas as an adhoc Jungle Training School at Mynkre near Jowai, Meghalaya in 1967. In 1968, it was designated as the Eastern Command Counter Insurgency Training School. Later the school was shifted to its present location Vairengte in Mizoram on 1 May 1970 and was redesignated as CIJW School. The success of this school prompted the establishment of another counter insurgency training centre, the Kaziranga Special Jungle Warfare Training School in Assam.

CIJWS functions from two complexes viz Vairengte in Mizoram and Lailapur in Assam under Army Training Command (ARTRAC), Shimla. In recognition of the high standards of training being imparted at the School, CIJW School was awarded with the General Officer Commanding-in-Chief, ARTRAC Unit Citation twice viz on 15 January 2013 and on 15 January 2020.

In 2024, six women officers of the Indian Army were inducted into the CIJW School for a course in Low Intensity Conflict Operations (LICO).

=== CIJW School Insignia ===
The School insignia is unique and symbolic of the Counter Insurgency (CI) and Jungle Warfare techniques. The emerald green background depicts the mirror of the natural greenery and jungle environment. The thin scarlet border signifies the predominance of the Infantry. The crossed arrows depict unconventional warfare and the bayonet is symbolic of the Infantry’s close quarter battle techniques of fighting guerrillas.

=== CIJW School Motto ===
Mission of the CIJW School is to support the Indian Army’s ability to conduct Counter Insurgency (CI) and Counter Terrorism (CT) operations within the country and worldwide by providing the best contemporary training and relevant conceptual development. The School motto is, 'Fight the Guerrilla like a Guerrilla' .

== See also ==
- Indian National Defence University
- Military Academies in India
- Sainik school
