= Exercise Trishul =

Tri-service military exercise by the Indian Armed Forces in 2025

Exercise Trishul, also known as Tri-Service Exercise 2025 (TSE-2025), is a series of tri-service military sub-exercises that was conducted by the Indian Armed Forces in coordination with the Central Armed Police Forces between 3 and 13 November 2025. The exercise brought together principle formations and assets from the Indian Army, Indian Navy and Indian Air Force for coordinated land, air and sea operations. The exercise was led by the Western Naval Command and was spread across Western India, including the desert and creek regions of Rajasthan and Gujarat, respectively, as well as the northern part of Arabian Sea.

== Background ==
The exercise followed earlier operational activity in 2025 and was widely reported as a follow-on large-scale rehearsal intended to validate joint war-fighting concepts and sustainment under high-intensity conditions. Analysts and official summaries placed Trishul within a sequence of operations in the western theatre, noting that it tested amphibious and littoral operations in the Sir Creek and Rann of Kutch regions alongside maritime strike, air-land integration and logistics under contested-airspace conditions.

== Objective ==
Exercise Trishul was meant to validate joint operations procedure and enhance interoperability of assets and infrastructure in order to strengthen inter-services network in the Armed Forces. The exercise provided emphasis on Intelligence, Surveillance and Reconnaissance (ISR), Electronic Warfare (EW), and Cyber Warfare operations. The exercise also included joint operations between the Army and Navy's amphibious components, including INS Jalashwa (L41) and Mk. IV LCU.

== Participants ==
The exercise involved 20–25 warships of the Navy, including surface ships and submarines, along with over 40 fighter and support aircraft of the Air Force, amphibious warfare assets and over 30,000 personnel and equipment of the Army.

The participating forces in the exercise included : —

- Indian Navy
  - Western Naval Command
- Indian Army
  - Southern Command
    - XII Corps
    - XXI Corps
- Indian Air Force
  - South Western Air Command
- Indian Coast Guard
- Border Security Force

== Timeline ==
The exercise officially commenced on 3 November 2025, though multiple small-scale exercises including Army's Agni Drishti and Trinetra as well as Air Force's MahaGujRaj-25 had commenced earlier.

The Agni Drishti exercise, led by the Agnibaaz Division (41 Artillery Division) of the XXI Corps, was conducted to demonstrate a new decision support architecture which integrates the land, air and space-based as well as unmanned ISR assets into a unified and network-centric, sensor-to-shooter grid. Meanwhile, Exercise Trinetra, also led by XXI Corps, was conducted in the southern desert region and aimed at validating the kill-chains of full-cycle Electromagnetic Spectrum Operations and Counter Unmanned Aerial System. The exercises were underway between 19 and 21 October.

As of 9 November, a drill involving the three services, the Indian Coast Guard and the Border Security Force was underway in the Kutch sector. Meanwhile, the Southern Command formations were scheduled to undertake Exercises ‘Maru Jwala’ and ‘Akhand Prahaar’ on 11 and 12 November to validate combined arms operations. The final phase would include a joint amphibious exercise off the Saurashtra Coast and would feature beach landing operations by the Southern Command’s amphibious forces.

On 11 November, the Army XXI Corps, also known as Sudarshan Chakra Corps, conducted Exercise Maru Jwala (lit. Desert fire) in Jaisalmer, Rajasthan. The principle formation in the exercise was the Shahbaaz Division, a RAPID formation (Re-organised Army Plains Infantry Division). Further units including the Southern Command's Aviation Brigade, Electronic Warfare Brigade and Para SF Battalion was part of the exercise. This was one of the Sudarshan Chakra Corps' extensive operations that spanned for two months. The exercise saw the maiden deployment of the 451 Army Aviation Squadron which is equipped with the AH-64E Apache.

On 12 November, the Army XII Corps, also known as Konark Corps, conducted Exercise Akhand Prahaar (lit. Sustained strike) in Jaisalmer, Rajasthan. It tested the ability of the Army to operate along with the Air Force across multiple domains flawlessly as well as evaluate multiple modern technologies, platforms and strategies. The exercise also served as the test bed which operationally validated the newly deployed Rudra Brigade of the Army. The exercise was led by the Battle Axe Division, another RAPID formation. With the operationalisation of these brigades, the Army reportedly plans to upgrade its Cold Start military doctrine to "Cold Strike". The exercise demonstrated Special Heliborne Operations, coordinated Attack Helicopter missions by Army Aviation as well as IAF fighter aircraft providing close air support to ground troops during operational missions. Akhand Prahaar validated the full-sepectrum combat readiness of the Corps formation.

The three commanders-in-chief of the Western Naval Command, Southern Command and South Western Air Command; namely, Vice Admiral Krishna Swaminathan, Lieutenant General Dhiraj Seth and Air Marshal Nagesh Kapoor embarked on board INS Vikrant. The officers witnessed carrier-borne fighter operations and underway replenishment in the night of 12 November.

Trishul culminated with an amphibious warfare exercise off the Saurashtra coast on 13 November. This exercise included beach landing operations by the amphibious forces of the Southern Command in order to validate full-spectrum land-sea-air integration. The rehearsal for the same was conducted on 12 November.

== Reactions ==
Domestic media presented Trishul as both an operational rehearsal and a strategic signal. Major outlets highlighted its role in testing multi-domain command, control and communications systems, integrating drone-based ISR and counter-UAS measures, and practising amphibious logistics and maritime strike doctrines.

Internationally, Pakistani authorities issued maritime and air advisories in response to Trishul, heightening surveillance in adjacent air and sea spaces. Reports noted temporary closures in parts of Pakistan’s airspace during the exercise window, and regional media interpreted the timing and scale as a deliberate deterrent signal.

Analysts noted that Trishul validated recent doctrinal and equipment integration, tested long-range fires, air defence coordination, and logistics support for expeditionary and littoral operations. Editorials described it as both a capability rehearsal and a deterrence signal reinforcing India’s readiness for integrated operations.

== See also ==
- Exercise TROPEX
- List of exercises of the Indian Air Force
- List of exercises of the Indian Army
- Exercise Milan
- Exercise Tarang Shakti
