= TROPEX =

Inter-service military exercise

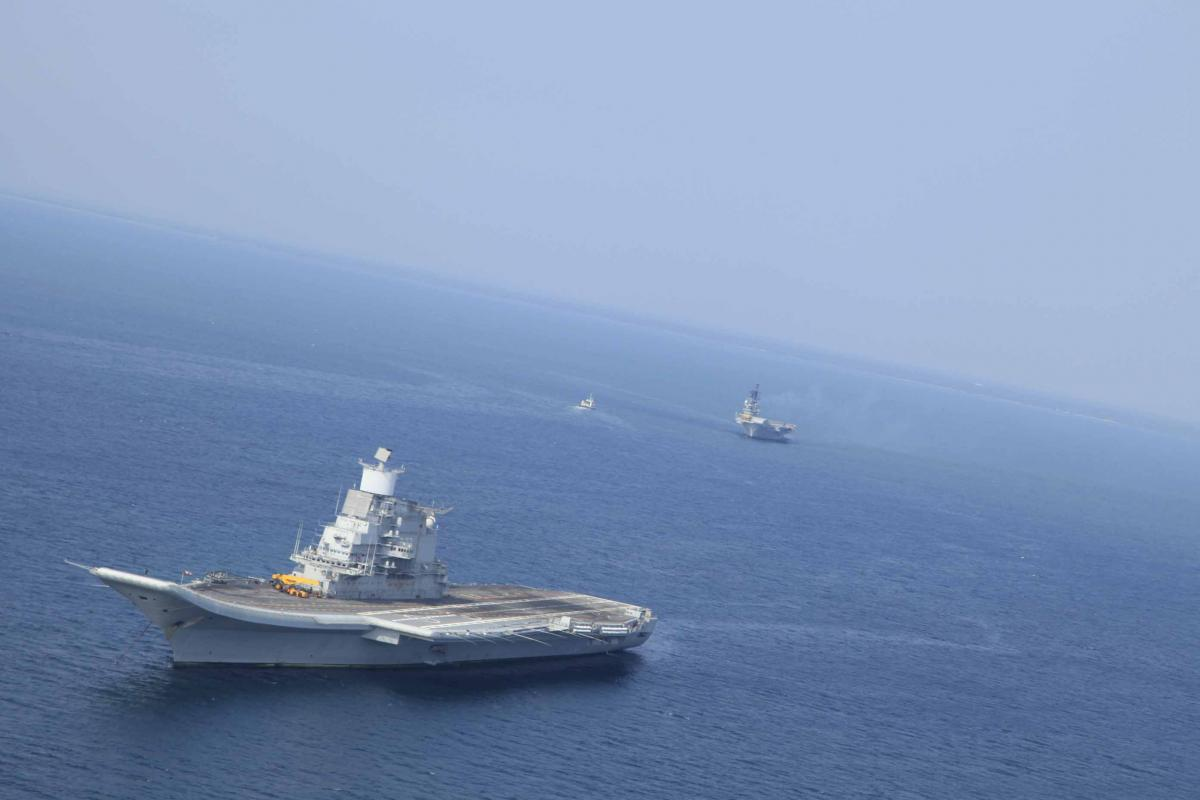
INS Vikramaditya at anchor off Kochi, with INS Viraat in the background during TROPEX 2015

Theatre Level Operational Readiness Exercise (TROPEX) is an inter-service military exercise involving the participation of the Indian Army, Air Force, Navy and the Coast Guard. The exercise generally commences at the beginning of each year and lasts a month. It is generally carried out in three phrases: independent workup phase, joint workup phase and tactical phase.

The exercise is designed to test the combat readiness of the Indian naval units, as well as the Indian Air Force, Indian Army and the Indian Coast Guard. It also seeks to strengthen interoperability and joint operations in a complex environment.

Beginning in 2005, the exercise has been held annually, with the exception of 2016 and 2018. The latest edition of the exercise was conducted in 2025.

== Editions ==
=== TROPEX 2005 ===
TROPEX 2005 was conducted by the Indian Navy's Western Naval Command off the Goa coast. It commenced in April 2005 and involved units of the Indian Navy, Army, Air Force and Coast Guard. The exercise included weapon firings and evaluation of various combat tactics. Vice Admiral Madanjit Singh, Flag Officer Commanding in Chief (FOC-in-C) Western Naval Command, witnessed the exercise.

=== TROPEX 2006 ===
TROPEX 2006 commenced on 5 April 2006 and continued until 26 April 2006. The exercise was conducted off the western seaboard of India. It included a joint workup phase from 5 to 11 April, comprising both fleets. This was followed by a deployment and tactical phase which commenced on 12 April and continued until 21 April 2006. On 21 April 2006, an Indian naval missile corvette Prahar, collided with a merchant vessel Rajiv Gandhi head-on and sank about three hours after the collision about ten nautical miles off Mormugao port in Goa. The corvette was on its way to Mumbai, after the completion of TROPEX exercise, when the incident happened. The corvette's entire crew of seventy-three were rescued before it sank and no injuries were reported.

=== TROPEX 2007 ===
TROPEX 2007 commenced on 30 January 2007 and was conducted in the Arabian Sea. The exercise involved fifty ships from the Indian Navy's Western and Eastern Naval Command, including the aircraft carrier INS Viraat, Rajput and Delhi-class destroyers, and Talwar, Brahmaputra and Godavari-class frigates. It also involved elements from the Army, Air Force, and the Coast Guard. Towards the later stages of the exercise, the navy deployed UAVs, Kamov 31 AEW helicopters, missile defence systems like Barak, Shtil and Kashmir surface-to-air missiles, besides land-attack missiles. During the exercise, participating forces successfully conducted firing of live weapons, including firing of surface-to-air as well as surface-to-surface missiles. In addition, they also tested new operational concepts and learned valuable lessons, which will then be analyzed and used for improving existing operational doctrines.

=== TROPEX 2008 ===
TROPEX 2008 was conducted on India's Eastern seaboard. The exercise included the independent workup phase, joint workup phase and tactical phase. On 1 February 2008, while the exercise was underway, five India naval personnel were killed and three others were critically injured aboard the amphibious transport warship INS Jalashwa, when they inadvertently inhaled the poisonous hydrogen sulphide (H2S) gas while trying to locate the source of the leakage in a compartment of the ship. Jalashwa, which was purchased from the United States the previous year, was engaged in the exercise with other naval units in the Bay of Bengal, between Visakhapatnam and Port Blair when the mishap occurred. Among the injured were Lieutenant commander Shwet Gupta and Lieutenant Ruchir Prasad. Gupta subsequently succumbed to his injuries on 9 February 2008, bringing the total number of sailors killed to six. Prasad, one of the survivors, later narrated that Gupta, sensing the gravity of the situation, promptly decided to not wait for the gas masks, and, regardless of personal risk, rushed to the rescue of trapped sailors aboard the Jalashwa, and in the process inhaled the poisonous gas. "He jumped and so did I," Prasad said, "I was the last man to see him conscious before I fell myself and in those 30 to 60 seconds we were down there, all I remember is how he showed utter disregard to his own safety." Gupta was posthumously awarded the Nao Sena Medal for his gallantry.

=== TROPEX 2009 ===
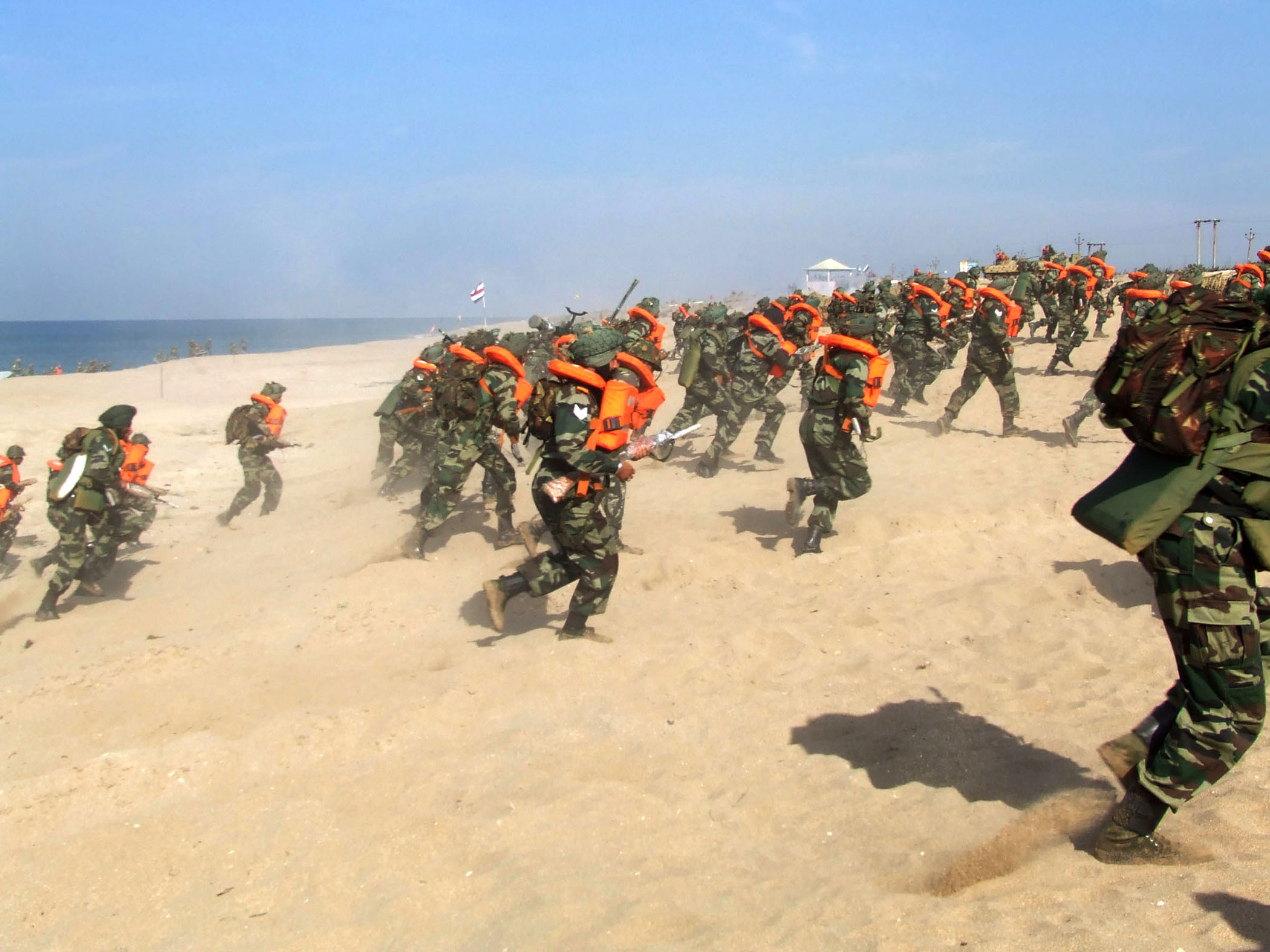
Hundreds of Infantry soldiers rushing towards simulated enemy targets at Madhavpur beach, Gujarat, during Exercise Tropex-09

TROPEX 2009 took place from 27 January to 25 February 2009. It was conducted by the Indian Navy, Indian Air Force and Indian Coast Guard at Madhavpur Beach, Gujarat. The exercise involved an amphibious landing on the beach and complex military manoeuvres. It included around 1,500 Indian Armed Forces' personnel. Indian Navy assets included amphibious transport dock INS Jalashwa, amphibious warfare vessels, fleet ships with their integral helicopters, shore-based aircraft, and submarines. Indian Air Force assets such as Jaguar and MiG-29 aircraft were also seen in action. It was witnessed by then Air Marshal K D Singh (AOC in C, South Western Air Command), then Vice Admiral J S Bedi (FOC in C, Western Naval Command) and then Lieutenant General Pradeep Khanna (GOC in C, Southern Command).

=== TROPEX 2010 ===
TROPEX 2010 was conducted from 7 February to mid-March 2010 off the Eastern seaboard of India. Major surface combatants, including the aircraft carrier, INS Viraat, airborne early warning (AEW) helicopters, UAVs from the Indian Navy's Western and Eastern Naval Command along with assets from the Indian Air Force, including Su-30MKI, and Jaguars. The Indian Coast Guard also took part in the exercise.

It included a mock battle to test the tactical skills and operational readiness of the armed forces. It was witnessed by then Admiral Nirmal Verma (Chief of the Naval Staff) and then Defence Secretary Pradeep Kumar from aboard INS Viraat. It also included missile, torpedo and gun firings exercises.

"Overall, the exercise is intended to thoroughly test the human and material endurance of the Navy, the efficacy of its operational and logistics plans and its combat effectiveness," said a press release issued by Ministry of Defence.

=== TROPEX 2011 ===
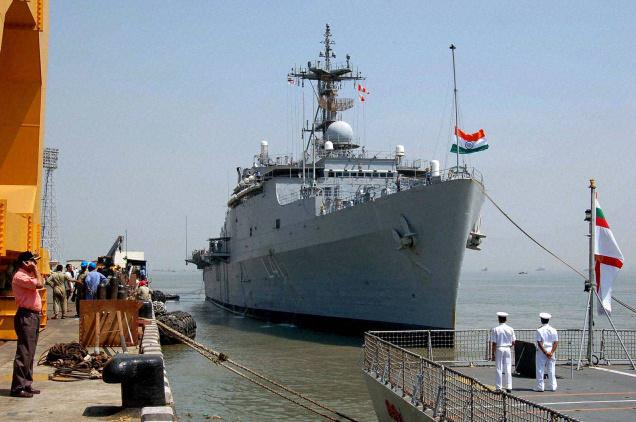
INS Jalashwa, in Mumbai, before proceeding to Libya.

TROPEX 2011 was conducted in February 2011 on the Western seaboard and involved units of the Indian Navy, Army and Air Force. It was carried out in three phases: independent workup phase, joint workup phase and tactical phase. During the exercise, the navy pulled out its largest amphibious warship INS Jalashwa, which was then ordered to proceed to Libya to evacuate its nationals, who were fleeing from the Libyan Civil War.

=== TROPEX 2012 ===
TROPEX 2012 was conducted from the end of January to early March 2012 on the Eastern Seaboard. Over forty ships, including INS Viraat and INS Shivalik, submarines, along with large number of aircraft, including the Sea Harrier, and unmanned aerial vehicles from the Indian Navy's Western and Eastern Naval Command, and elements from the Indian Air Force, participated in the exercise. Indian Air Force assets included a variety of aircraft such as Su-30MKI, Jaguar, Mirage 2000 and Airborne Early Warning and Control (AEW&C). It was witnessed by then Admiral Nirmal Verma (Chief of the Naval Staff), then Flag Officer Commanding-in-Chief, Eastern Naval Command Vice Admiral AK Chopra, and then defence minister A.K. Antony.

=== TROPEX 2013 ===
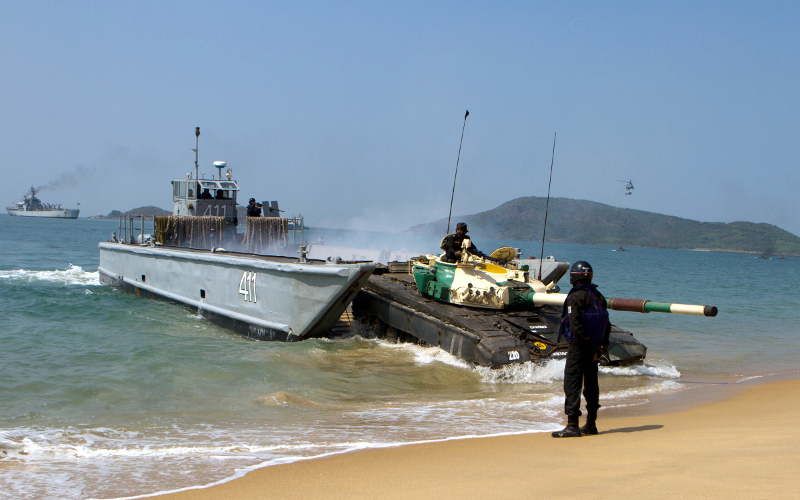
Amphibious landing during TROPEX 2013

TROPEX 2013 was conducted off India's west coast. It included ships, submarines and aircraft from all Commands of the Indian Navy, with joint participation of units from the Indian Army, Indian Air Force and the Indian Coast Guard. Over 50 ships and submarines, and around 75 aircraft participated in TROPEX 2013, which concluded on 1 March 2013. The navy conducted manoeuvres, weapon firings and tactical evaluation. TROPEX 2013 also included an amphibious segment, involving around 2000 troops, tanks, amphibious vehicles and other equipment.

=== TROPEX 2014 ===
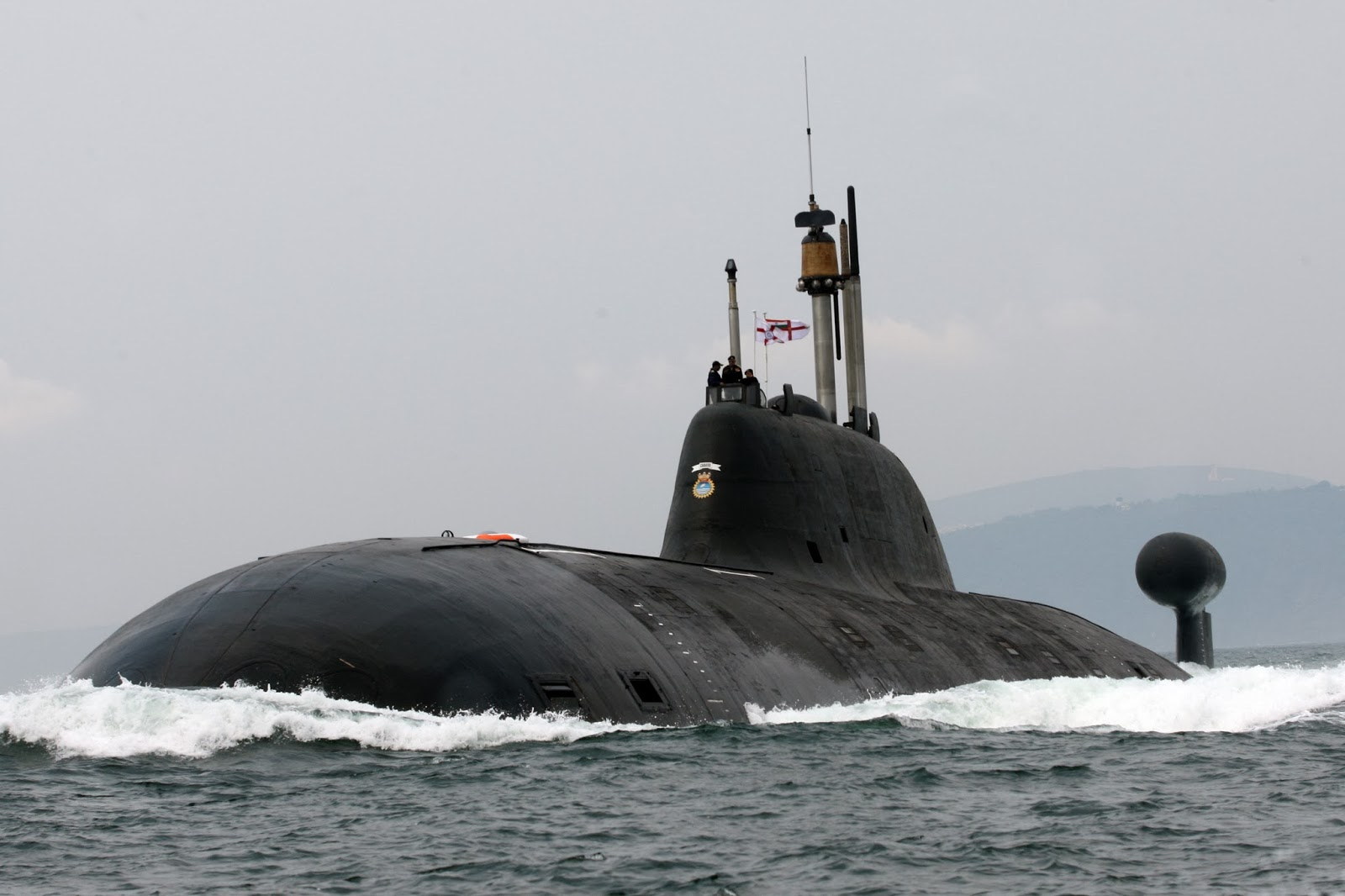
The nuclear–powered attack submarine Chakra underway during TROPEX 2014

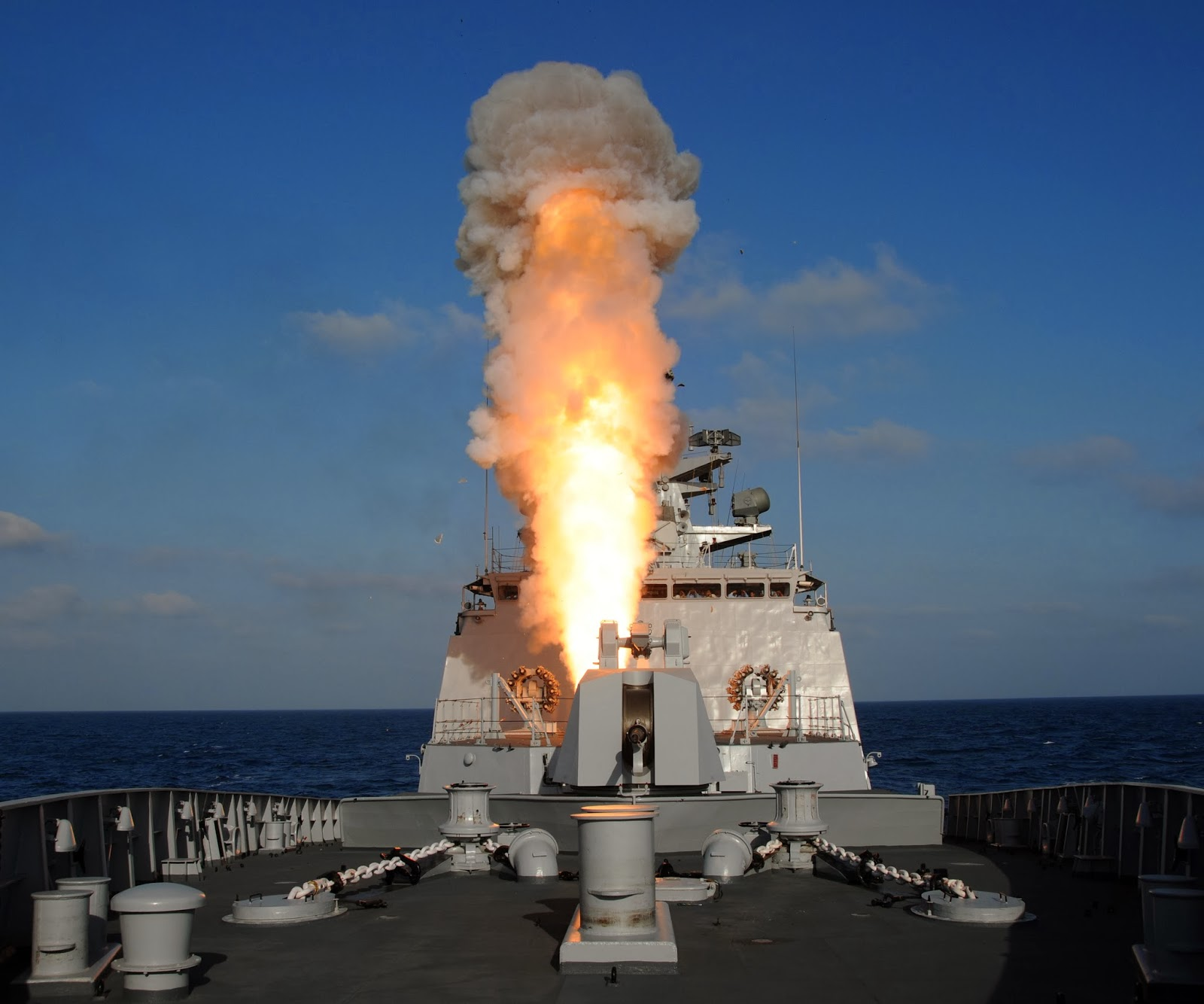
Live firing from a Shivalik-class frigate during TROPEX 2014

TROPEX 2014 marked the debut of the Indian Navy's new P-8I Neptune long range maritime patrol aircraft, nuclear submarine INS Chakra, and the Hawk advanced trainer aircraft of the Indian Air Force. The Indian Navy conducted large scale manoeuvres in all three dimensions (land, sea, air), across the Bay of Bengal, Arabian Sea and the Indian Ocean. Around 60 ships, including the aircraft carrier INS Viraat and submarines of the navy, and 75 aircraft, and assets from the Indian Air Force, and the Indian Coast Guard participated in the TROPEX 2014, which concluded on 28 February 2014. This year's TROPEX was aimed at testing combat readiness of the naval units. It also focused on validating the Indian Navy's war fighting doctrine and integration of newly included capabilities in its 'Concept of Operations'. The Indian Navy validated its network centric warfare capabilities, wherein, its recently launched satellite GSAT 7 was extensively utilised.

=== TROPEX 2015 ===
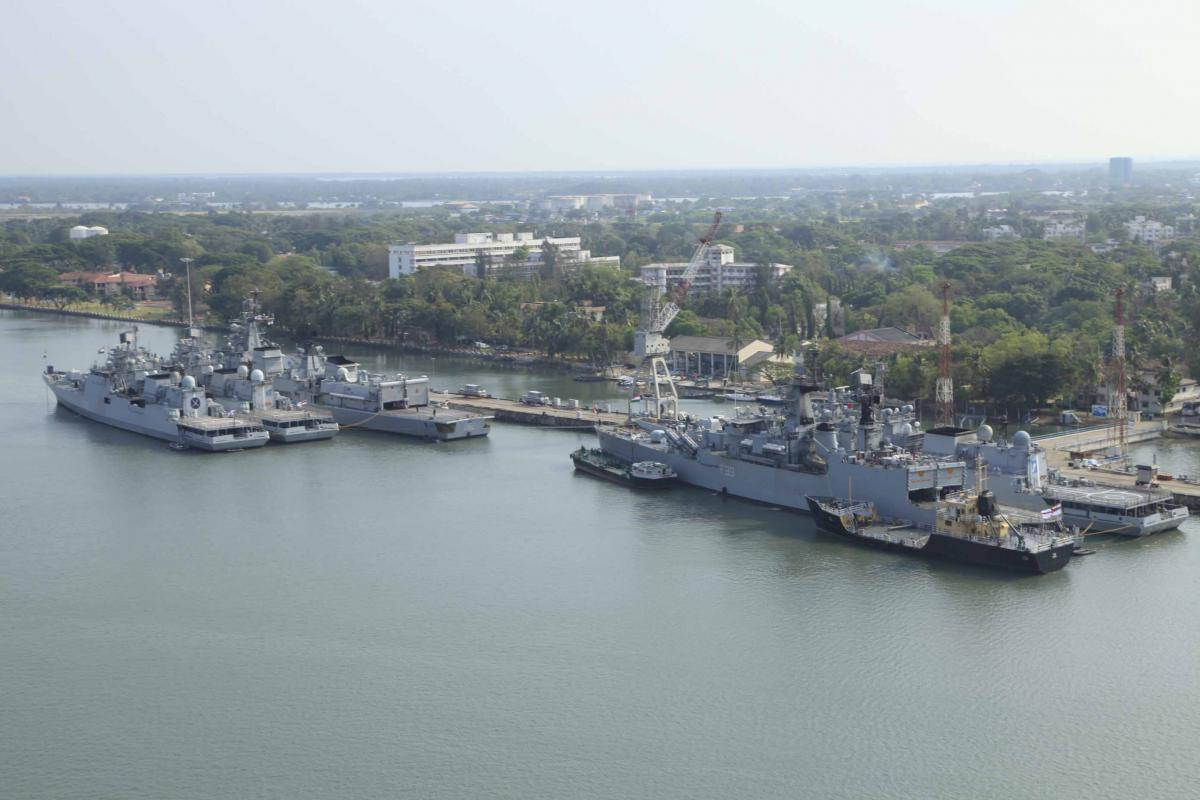
Western Fleet Ships berthed in Kochi during TROPEX 2015

TROPEX 2015 was conducted from the end of January to 27 February 2015 across the Arabian Sea and the northern Indian Ocean. Around 50 ships, including the guided missile destroyer INS Kolkata and anti-submarine warfare corvette INS Kamorta, and submarines, including the nuclear submarine INS Chakra, from the three Indian Naval commands, along with more than 70 aircraft, including the P-8I Neptune, and assets from the Indian Air Force and the Indian Coast Guard participated. This year's TROPEX focused on validating the Indian Navy's concept of operations.

The Indian Navy deployed two aircraft carrier battle groups, led by INS Vikramaditya and INS Viraat to take part, thus demonstrating its capability of deploying more than one carrier task force at the same time. A statement issued by the Ministry of Defence read: "The exercise provided the right opportunity for the navy to integrate these acquisitions into its war-fighting concepts. TROPEX-15 also served to reinforce the Indian Navy's offensive capabilities across all dimensions, including Network Centric Operations, wherein, the indigenous satellite Rukmani was extensively utilised." Indian defence minister Manohar Parrikar witnessed the exercise. He also spent a night on-board INS Vikramaditya during the exercise.

=== TROPEX 2017 ===
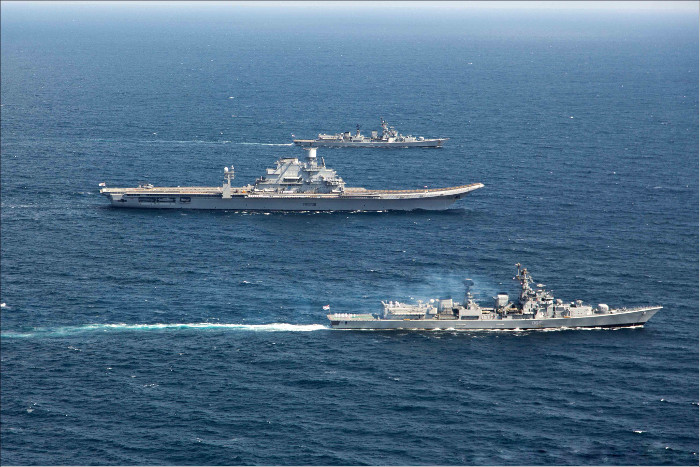
TROPEX 2017

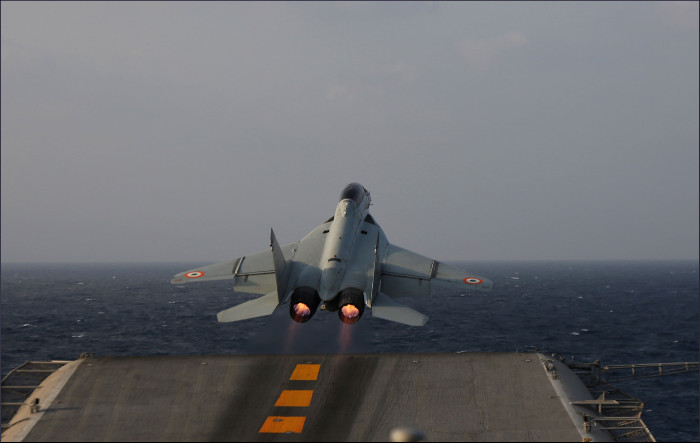
A MiG 29K takes off from INS Vikramaditya during TROPEX 2017.

TROPEX 2017 was conducted from 24 January to 23 February 2017 off the Western Seaboard of India. The exercise included both a harbour and sea phase. Over 45 ships, including the aircraft carrier INS Vikramaditya and amphibious transport dock INS Jalashwa, five submarines, including INS Chakra, 50 aircraft from the Indian Navy's Western and Eastern Naval Command, 11 ships from the Indian Coast Guard, 20 aircraft from the Indian Air Force including Su-30MKI, SEPECAT Jaguar, AWACS, C-130J Super Hercules and in-flight refuelling aircraft Il-78MKI, and Indian Army troops participated in TROPEX 2017.

The exercise was conducted in various phases. The joint workup phase witnessed various weapon firings by assets of the navy and the air force. This was followed by a tactical phase which lasted for over 10 days. "The interaction of the forces helped validate operational war fighting concepts and provided valuable lessons to sharpen combat skills," a statement issued by Ministry of Defence said.

Tropex 2017 included firing a BrahMos missile from guided missile destroyer INS Chennai and the firing of a Kh-35 anti-ship missile from an upgraded Il-38 Sea Dragon maritime patrol aircraft. The exercise was witnessed by Admiral Sunil Lanba (Chief of the Naval Staff), General Bipin Rawat (Chief of the Army Staff) and Vice Admiral Girish Luthra (FOC in C, Western Naval Command).

Beside gunnery shoots, missile firing, and air defense exercises, TROPEX 2017 featured Large Force Engagement (LFE) by Indian Navy fleet units against threats simulated by the Indian Air Force with key assets such as Su-30MKI and Jaguars, equipped with Harpoon anti-ship missiles, representing enemy aircraft. These threats, coming from different directions, were neutralised by MiG-29K interceptors taking off from the aircraft carrier, INS Vikramaditya, in coordination with other fleet elements.

"TROPEX 2017 assumes great significance in the backdrop of current security scenario. The exercise provided an apt-opportunity to test the combat capability of the Indian Navy, Indian Army, Indian Air Force and Coast Guard, and strengthened inter-operability and joint operations in complex conflict situation," a Navy statement said.

=== TROPEX 2019 ===
TROPEX 2019 had commenced 7 January 2019 and was planned to be terminated by 10 Mar 2019. However, the JeM-sponsored terrorist attack on the CRPF convoy in Pulwama on 14 February 2019 led to the rapid redeployment of the Indian Navy for Operations in North Arabian sea. About 60 ships of the Indian Navy, 12 ships of the Indian Coast Guard and 60 aircraft were part of TROPEX 19. TROPEX 19 had commenced with tri-services Amphibious Exercise in the Andaman & Nicobar Islands with participation of Army and Air Force. This was followed by the largest Coastal Defence Exercise code-named Sea Vigil on 22–23 January with participation of all 13 Coastal States and Union Territories along with all maritime stakeholders. The TROPEX itself was thus far the largest in terms of geographical spread covering the IOR and also with regard to the number of participating units.

=== TROPEX 2021 ===
TROPEX 2021 commenced in early January 2021 and will end in the third week of February. Almost all assets of the Navy are taking part, as well as units from the Army, Airforce and Coast Guard. It is the navy's largest war game. Drills and exercises including SEA VIGIL and AMPHEX-21 were part TROPEX.

=== TROPEX 2022-23 ===
TROPEX 2023 commenced in November 2022 and extended till March 2023. The exercise was conducted in the Indian Ocean Region, Bay of Bengal and Arabian Sea. The exercise included Exercise Sea Vigil (Coastal Defence) and AMPHEX (Amphibious operations). The entire exercise included 70 Indian Navy ships, 6 submarines and more than 75 aircraft.

=== TROPEX 2024-25 ===
The 2024 edition of the exercise started with Exercise Sea Vigil 2024 was the fourth edition of the type. The exercise will simulate coastal defence with the participation of 6 Union Ministries, 21 organisations/agencies.

The 2025 edition of Theatre Level Operational Exercise (TROPEX) was conducted from January to early March 2025. The edition saw participation of all operational units of the Indian Navy along with participation of Indian Army and Air Force assets. The exercise was undertaken in multiple phases, both at Harbour and at Sea, including cyber and electronic warfare operations, Tactical Phase, live weapon firings during Joint Work Up Phase and the Amphibious Exercise (AMPHEX). The exercise saw the participation of 65-70 ships and 9-10 submarines of the Navy, over 10 ships of the Coast Guard, over 80 aircraft from the Air Force, Navy and Coast Guard and an Infantry Battalion of the Army with over 600 personnel. INS Vikrant, Kolkata and Visakhapatnam-class destroyers and Kalvari-class submarines were part of the Indian Navy's fleet along with MiG-29K, P-8I, MQ-9B and MH-60R aircraft. Meanwhile, The Air Force had deployed Su-30MKI, Jaguar, C-130J, Il-78MKI and Phalcon aircraft. The exercise included operations spanning about 4,300 nmi (8,000 km) from North to 35 degrees south and 5,000 nmi (9,300 km) from Strait of Hormuz in the West to the Sunda and Lombok Straits in the East.

== See also ==
- Exercise Trishul
- List of exercises of the Indian Air Force
- List of exercises of the Indian Army
- Exercise Milan
- Exercise Tarang Shakti
