= USS Comstock (LSD-45) =

American dock landing ship

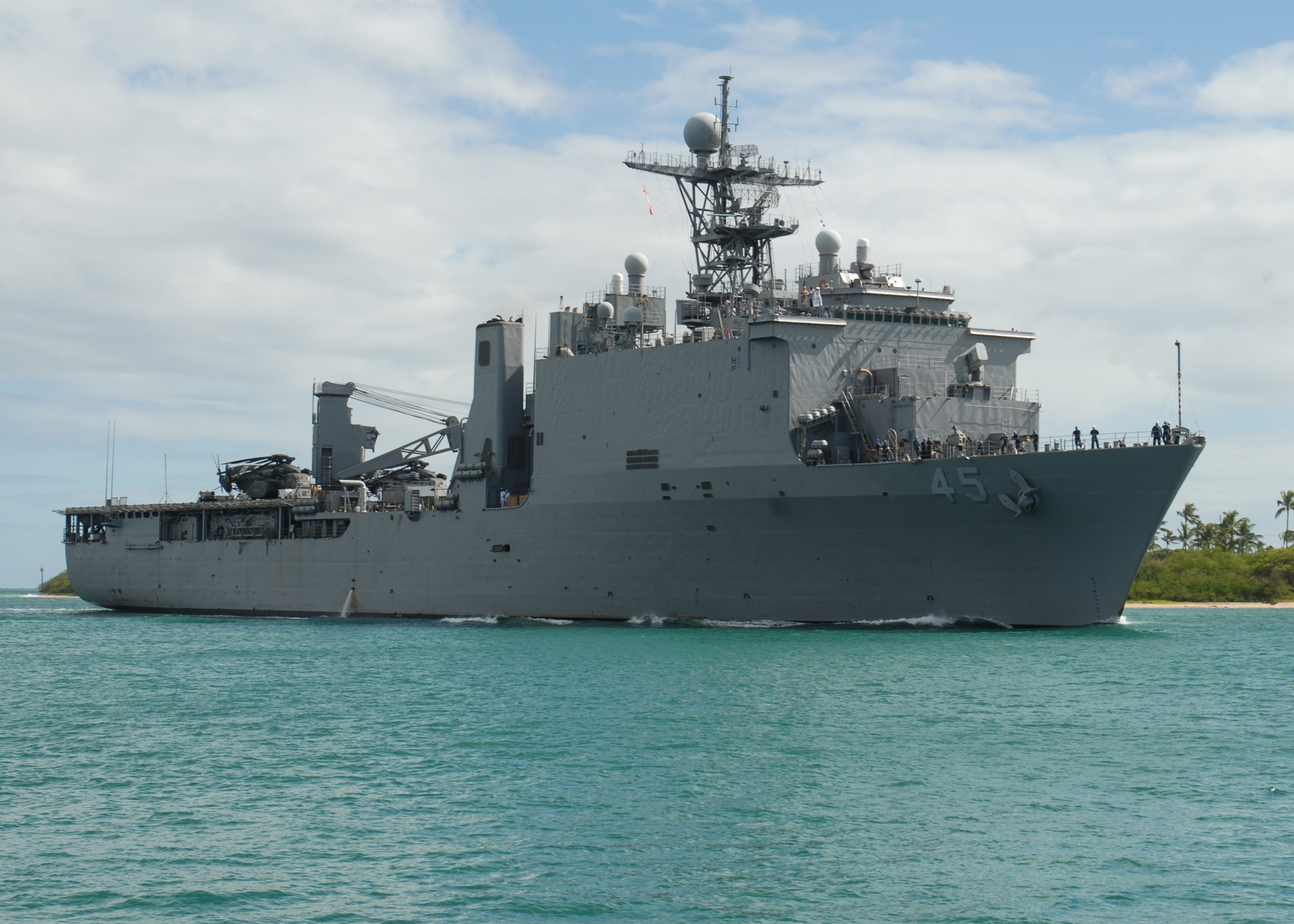
- USS Comstock (LSD-45)

History

United States
- Name: Comstock
- Namesake: Comstock Lode in Nevada
- Ordered: 26 November 1984
- Builder: Avondale Shipyards New Orleans, Louisiana
- Laid down: 27 October 1986
- Launched: 15 January 1988
- Commissioned: 3 February 1990
- Home port: Naval Base San Diego
- Identification: International Call Sign "NCWK"
- Motto: Teamwork, Drive, Courage
- Status: in active service
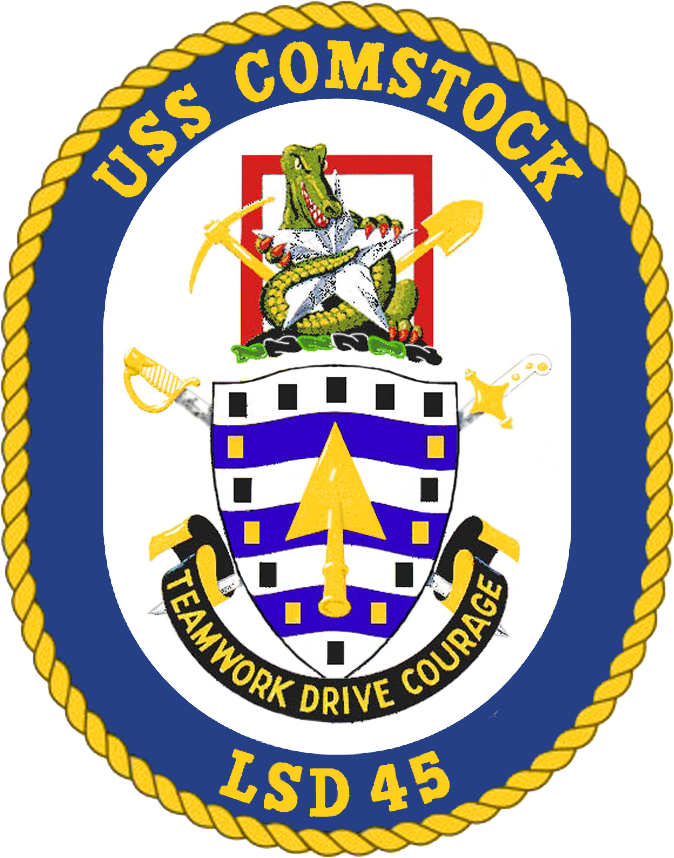
- Badge

General characteristics
- Class & type: Whidbey Island-class dock landing ship
- Displacement: 11,099 tons (light); 16,190 tons (full)
- Length: 609 ft (186 m)
- Beam: 84 ft (26 m)
- Draft: 21 ft (6.4 m)
- Propulsion: 4 Colt Industries PC2.5V, 16-cylinder diesel engines, 2 shafts, 33,000 shp (25,000 kW)
- Speed: over 20 knots (37 km/h; 23 mph)
- Boats & landing craft carried: 4 LCACs, or 2 LCUs.
- Troops: Marine detachment: 402 + 102 surge
- Complement: 22 officers, 391 enlisted
- Armament: 2 × 25 mm Mk 38 cannons; 2 × 20 mm Phalanx CIWS mounts; 6 × .50 caliber M2HB machine guns; 2 × RAMs

USS Comstock (LSD-45) is a Whidbey Island-class dock landing ship of the United States Navy. She was the second Navy ship to be named for the Comstock Lode in Nevada, the first being Comstock (LSD-19), commissioned in 1945 and decommissioned in 1976. The Comstock Lode was discovered in 1859, and was one of the richest deposits of precious metals known in the world.

== History ==
Comstock was laid down on 27 October 1986, by the Avondale Shipyards, New Orleans, Louisiana; launched on 15 January 1988; and commissioned on 3 February 1990. At first USS Comstock had an all-male crew, but soon became the first United States Navy combatant ship to have a fully integrated crew of male and female sailors.

In 2002, Comstock is homeported at NS San Diego, California, and assigned to Expeditionary Strike Group 3. In 2014, she was part of the Makin Island amphibious ready group.

In December 2020, the U.S. Navy's Report to Congress on the Annual Long-Range Plan for Construction of Naval Vessels stated that the ship was planned to be placed Out of Commission in Reserve in 2026.

She took part in Exercise Tiger Triumph's fourth edition in 2025 with the Indian Armed Forces in Visakhapatnam, India.

On 19 March 2026, it was reported that the USS Boxer-led Amphibious Ready Group (ARG) was deploying ahead of schedule to support Operation Epic Fury. The Boxer had left San Diego, California to begin its journey to the Middle East. It will be joined by the USS Portland and Comstock. The ARG relieved the Tripoli Amphibious Ready Group that was already on station. The 11th Marine Expeditionary Unit (MEU) has embarked on the ARG ships which will sail through the Indo-Pacific to the Middle East. There are around 2,500 Marine Corps personnel of the 4,000 service members in the fleet. The sailors and Marines have shortened their leave following certification and training in order to accelerate their deployment. COMSTOCK arrived in area first, ahead of the force.

On August 26, 2026 she broke the record of the most days underway for a Whidbey Island Class LSD at 127 days. Previous record was held by USS Whidbey Island during Operation Sharp Edge.
