= Tiger Triumph =

Indian-American military exercise

Tiger Triumph is the bilateral tri-service, amphibious, military exercise involving the armed forces of India and the United States. It is the first tri-service military exercise between the two countries. India has previously only held tri-service exercises with Russia.

== 1st Edition (2019) ==
India and the United States signed a defence agreement on 6 September 2018 committing to holding a joint land, air and sea exercise in India in 2019. The final planning conference for Tiger Triumph was held at the Eastern Naval Command headquarters in Visakhapatnam, Andhra Pradesh on September 16–20, 2019 and was attended by delegates from the United States Navy and the United States Marine Corps and representatives from the Indian Army, Navy and Air Force. The two sides also visited the proposed campsite in Kakinada, Andhra Pradesh and conducted a table-top exercise as preparation. Tiger Triumph was publicly announced by U.S. President Donald Trump during his address at the Howdy Modi community event in honour of Prime Minister Narendra Modi at the NRG Stadium in Houston, Texas on 22 September 2019.

The Indian Navy's Eastern Fleet commander served as the overall force commander for Tiger Triumph, with a U.S. Marine Corps officer attached with him. A total of 1,200 Indian and 500 U.S. military personnel participated in the nine-day exercise. The American side was led by the United States Marine Corps Forces, Pacific. Marines and sailors traveled from Okinawa, Japan to Vishakhapatnam arriving on board the USS Germantown (LSD-42) on 13 November 2019. The Indian Navy was represented by amphibious transport dock INS Jalashwa (L41), amphibious warfare vessel INS Airavat (L24), and survey ship INS Sandhayak (J18). Indian Army troops from the 19 Madras and 7 Guards, Indian Air Force Mil Mi-17 helicopters and Rapid Action Medical Team (IAF-RAMT) also participated in the exercise. The United States sent the USS Germantown and troops from the 3rd Marine Division. The opening ceremony of Tiger Triumph was held aboard the INS Jalashwa on 14 November, along with a joint flag parade and media interaction, followed by a reception aboard the USS Germantown.

The exercise was held in two phases. The harbour phase was held in Visakhapatnam on November 13–16 and included training visits, subject matter expert exchanges, sports events and social interactions. Both forces then sailed southward to Kakinada where the second phase was held on November 17–21. The exercise primarily focused on humanitarian disaster and relief (HADR) operations with aiming to imitate disasters occurring in areas where security was problematic. The two forces brought supplies on shore, established a field hospital, formed patrols to locate actors playing displaced civilians and carried out evacuation by helicopter. The exercise included live fire drills, search-and-seizure training, ship manoeuvres and landings by Indian helicopters on the Germantown's flight deck.

== 2nd Edition (2022) ==
The second edition was conducted for three days and concluded on 20 October 2022. The edition focused on humanitarian assistance and disaster relief (HADR) operations and had fifty participants combines. The tabletop of the exercise simulated a joint response from the India and US militaries and diplomatic missions to a notional third world country affected by a super cyclone. The exercise was conducted at Visakhapatnam, headquarters Eastern Naval Command.

== 3rd Edition (2024) ==
The third edition was held in two distinct phases. The Harbour Phase, held between 18 and 25 March 2024, included Subject Matter Expert Exchange, sports engagements, ship boarding drills and cross deck visits while the Sea Phase, held between 26 and 30 March 2024, included maritime sea exercise and landing of troops at Kakinada Beach to establish a joint Command and Control Centre and a Joint Relief and Medical Camp for HADR operations. The latter phase also included cross-deck operations of UH-3H Sea King, CH-53E Super Stallion and MH-60R Romeo helicopters of the Indian Navy and the United States Navy. The Indian Navy deployed INS Jalashwa (L41), Landing Ship Tanks (Large)their integral landing crafts and helicopters, a guided-missile frigate and a Long Range Maritime Reconnaissance Aircraft. While the Indian Army was represented by an Infantry Battalion Group and mechanical forces, the Indian Air Force deployed one of its medium-lift transport aircraft, transport helicopter and the Rapid Action Medical Team (RAMT). Meanwhile, the U.S. task force consisted of USS Somerset (LPD-25) along with its integral Landing Craft Air Cushions, a destroyer, reconnaissance and medium lift aircraft as well as the U.S. Marines. The Indian Special Forces of all the three services and the U.S. counterparts also conducted operations in Visakhapatnam and Kakinada in both the phases. The concludng ceremony was hosted onboard USS Somerset.

== 4th Edition (2025) ==
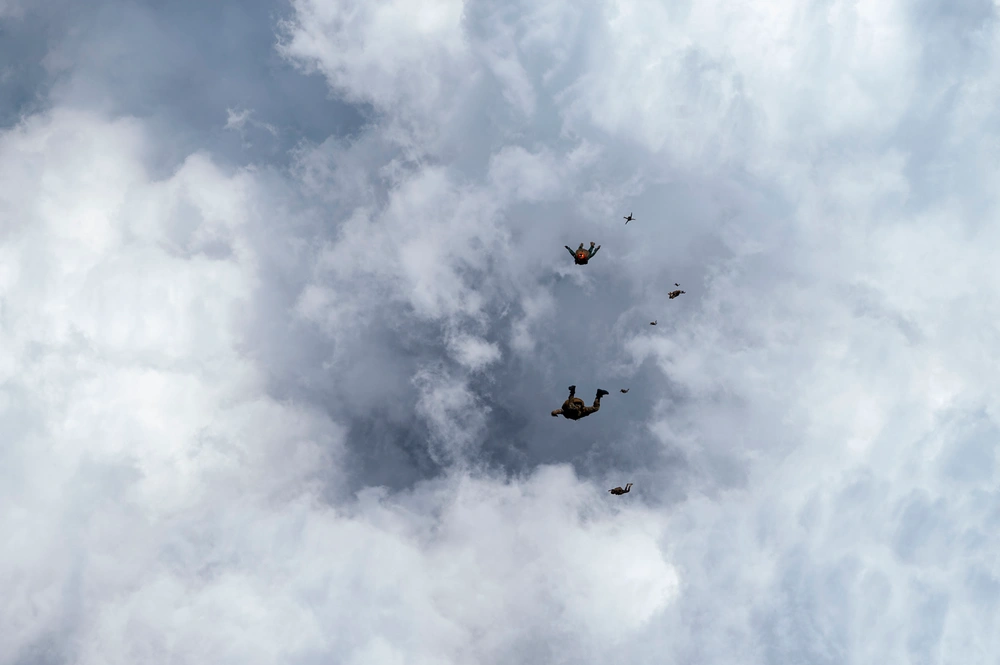
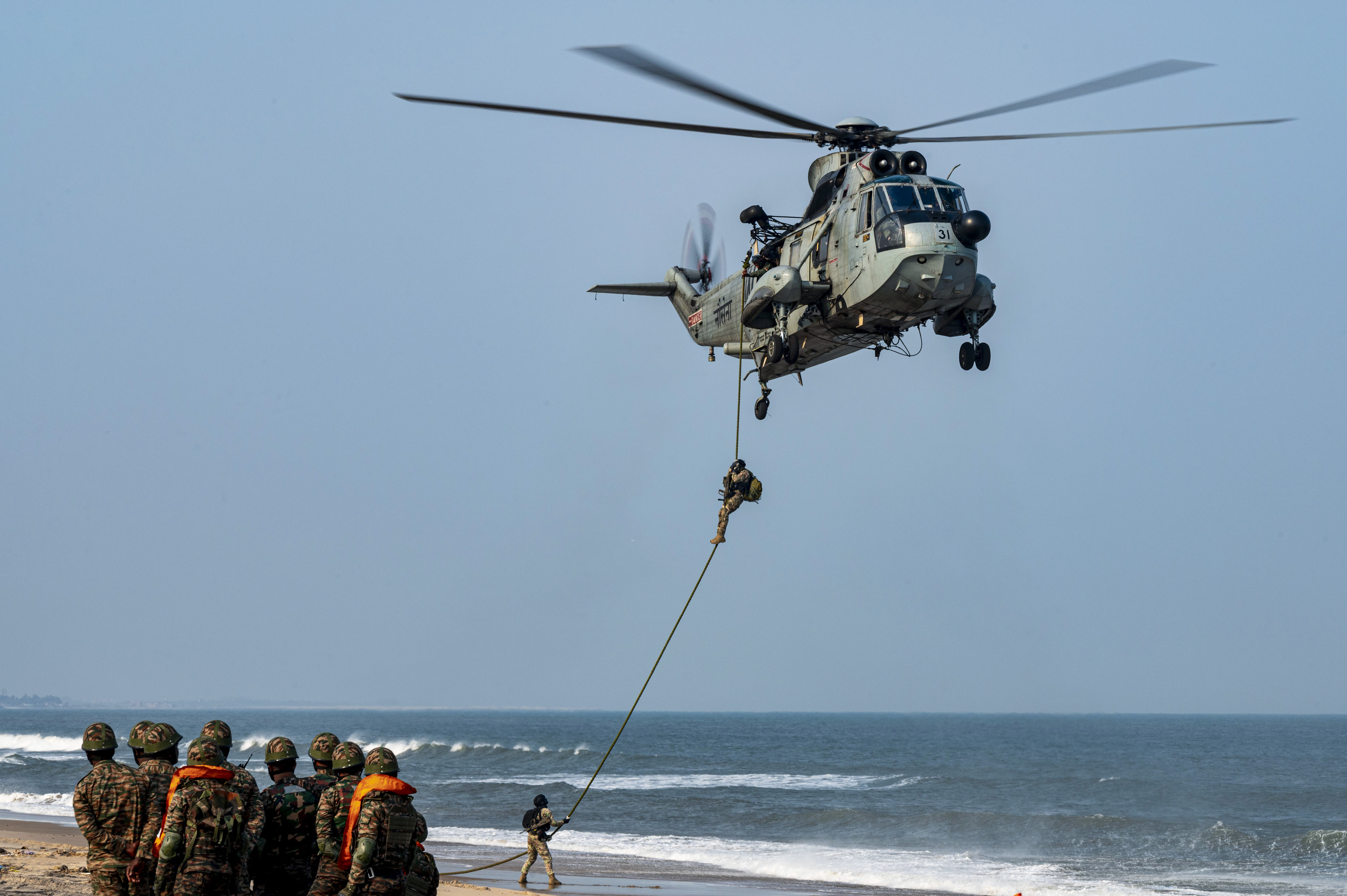
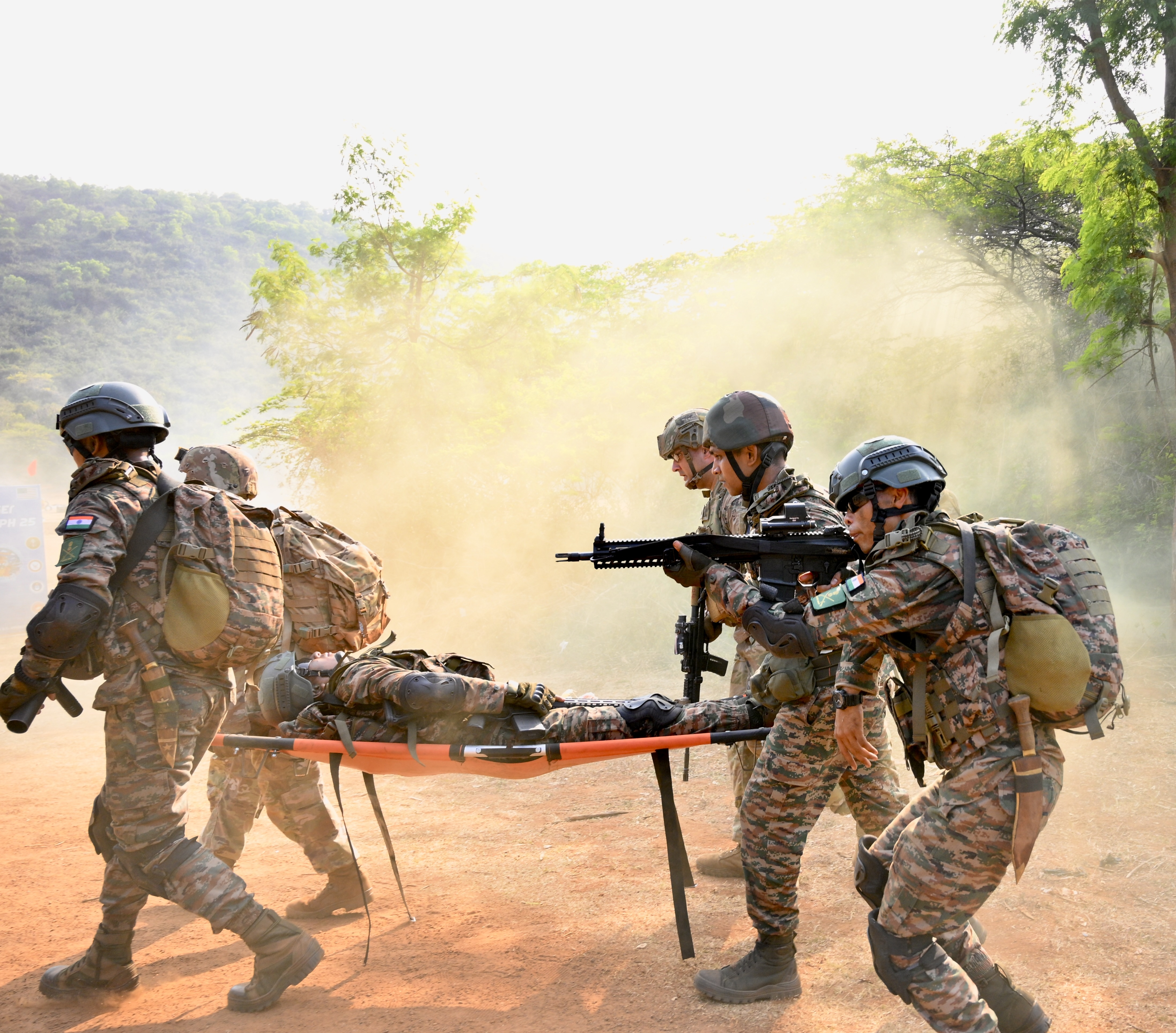

The fourth edition of the Tiger Triumph exercise was held in two phases, Harbour Phase from 1 to 7 April in Visakhapatnam and Sea Phase from 8 to 13 April in Kakinada on the Eastern Seaboard on India. The Sea Phase included Maritime, Amphibious and HADR operations off Kakinada as well as the establishment joint command and control center by the Indian Army and the USMC and a joint medical camp by IAF RAMT and USN. The exercise also focused on the formulation of a standard operating procedure (SOP) to establish a combined coordination center (CCC) for "rapid and smooth coordination between Indian and US joint task forces (JTF) during exercises and crisis".

The United States Space Force participated in the exercise with their Indian counterparts for the first time. The entire exercise will involve around 3,000 personnel, at least 4 ships and 7 aircraft.

The opening ceremony was held onboard INS Jalashwa on 1 April at Vishakhapatnam. Between 2 and 4 April 2025, intensive joint training phase at unit-level was conducted at the Duvvada Firing Range during the Harbour phase. The Sea Phase concluded with amphibious landing exercises with unified command and control (C2) on Kakinada beach on 11 April. The US Marines from the 1st LAR utilised Landing Craft Air Cushion from ACU-5 while the Indian Army personnelutilised Landing Craft Mechanised from INS Jalashwa during the exercise. A total of about 1,000 personnel took part in the landing drill from both the countries.

=== ORBAT ===
The Tiger Triumph 2025 saw the participation of:–

- Indian Armed Forces
  - Indian Navy
    - Eastern Naval Command
      - Eastern Fleet
        - INS Jalashwa (L41)
        - INS Gharial (L23)
        - INS Mumbai (D62)
        - INS Shakti (A57)
        - Integral helicopters of ships
        - Embarked landing crafts
        - INAS 312
          - Boeing P-8I Neptune
  - Indian Army
    - Southern Command
      - XXI Corps (Sudarshan Chakra)
        - 54 Infantry Division (Bison)
          - 91 Infantry Brigade
            - 4 Battalion, 8 Gorkha Rifles Infantry Battalion Group (Regiment)
  - Indian Air Force
    - Lockheed Martin C-130J Super Hercules
    - Mil Mi-17
    - Rapid Action Medical Team (RAMT)
  - Armed Forces Special Operations Division
- United States Armed Forces
  - INDOPACOM
    - United States Navy
      - USPACFLT
        - Third Fleet
          - USS Comstock (LSD-45)
          - Assault Craft Unit 5 (ACU 5)
        - Seventh Fleet
          - USS Ralph Johnson (DDG-114)
      - COMNAVAIRFOR
        - COMPATRECONWING 10
          - Boeing P-8A Poseidon
    - United States Marine Corps
      - MARFORPAC
        - I Marine Expeditionary Force
          - 1st Marine Division (Blue Diamond)
            - 1st Light Armored Reconnaissance Battalion (Highlanders)
    - United States Army
      - PACAF
        - 11th Airborne Division (Arctice Angels)
          - 1st Infantry Brigade Combat Team (Arctic Wolves)
            - 1st Battalion, 5th Infantry Regiment (Bobcat)
    - United States Air Force
      - USARPAC
        - Lockheed Martin C-130J Super Hercules
    - United States Special Operations Command

Additional units from the USA were Army platoon, medical platoon, Civil-Military Operations Center and Multi-Domain Task Force Combined Information Effects Fusion Cell. Special Forces from both the countries were also part of the exercise.

== 5th Edition (2026) ==
The 5th edition of the exercise was conducted as a Tabletop Exercise (TTX) at Maritime Warfare Centre, Visakhapatnam simulating a Tri-Service Humanitarian Assistance and Disaster Relief (HADR) scenario. The opening ceremony was hosted on 2 November. The ceremony was presided over by Rear Admiral Vishal Bishnoi, the Flag Officer Commanding Eastern Fleet, and Rear Admiral Joaquin J Martinez de Pinillos, the Vice Commander, US Pacific Fleet. The US Joint Forces consisted of their Air Force, Army, Marine Corps and Navy, as well as specialists in Space, Cyber, Medical and Explosive Ordnance Disposal. India's National Disaster Response Force (NDRF) is taking part for the first time in the exercise. Special forces from both the militaries are also taking part.

== See also ==
- Schriever wargame
- INDRA (naval exercise)
- Malabar (naval exercise)
- Yudh Abhyas
- Cope India
- Red Flag – Alaska
