= Yudh Abhyas =

Military training practices

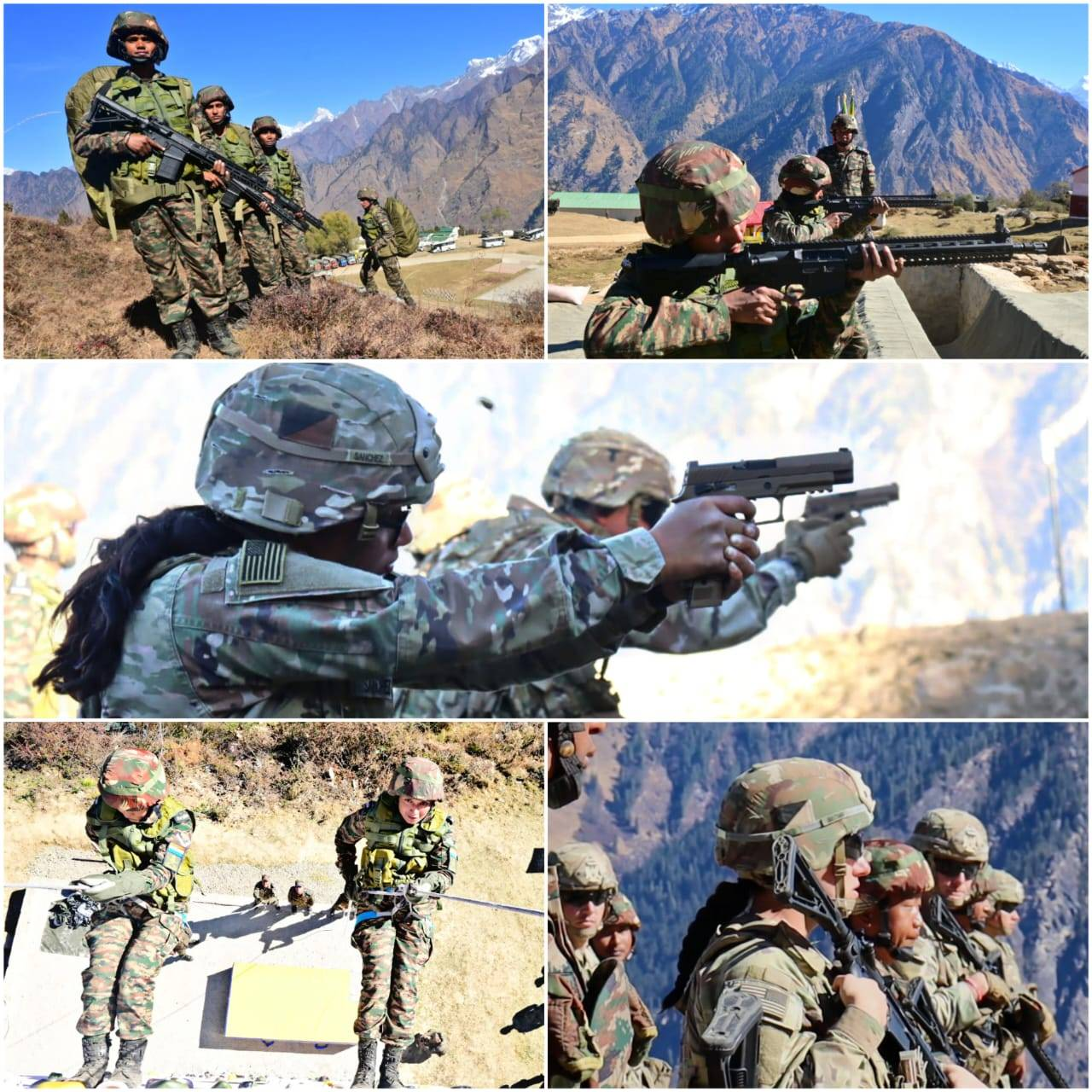
Female soldiers of the Indian Army and the US Army train together during Yudh Abhyas 2022.

Yudh Abhyas (lit. 'War Training') is an annual training practice between the United States Army and Indian Army.

== Objectives ==
Yudh Abhyas is a bilateral practice session on warfare related activities between Armies of India and the United States. It is called one of the longest running joint military training and defence cooperation between the US and India.

Yudh Abhyas training includes various types of technical and operational activities exchanged between armies of India and USA.

== Training Exercises ==
This exercise has been active since its inception in the year 2002.

The 16th edition of the exercise was held in February 2021 at the Mahajan Field Firing Range in Rajasthan, India.

From 15 to 29 October 2021, the 17th edition was held at the Joint Base Elmendorf–Richardson, Alaska, United States. The exercise included 350 personnel from each Indian and US Armies.

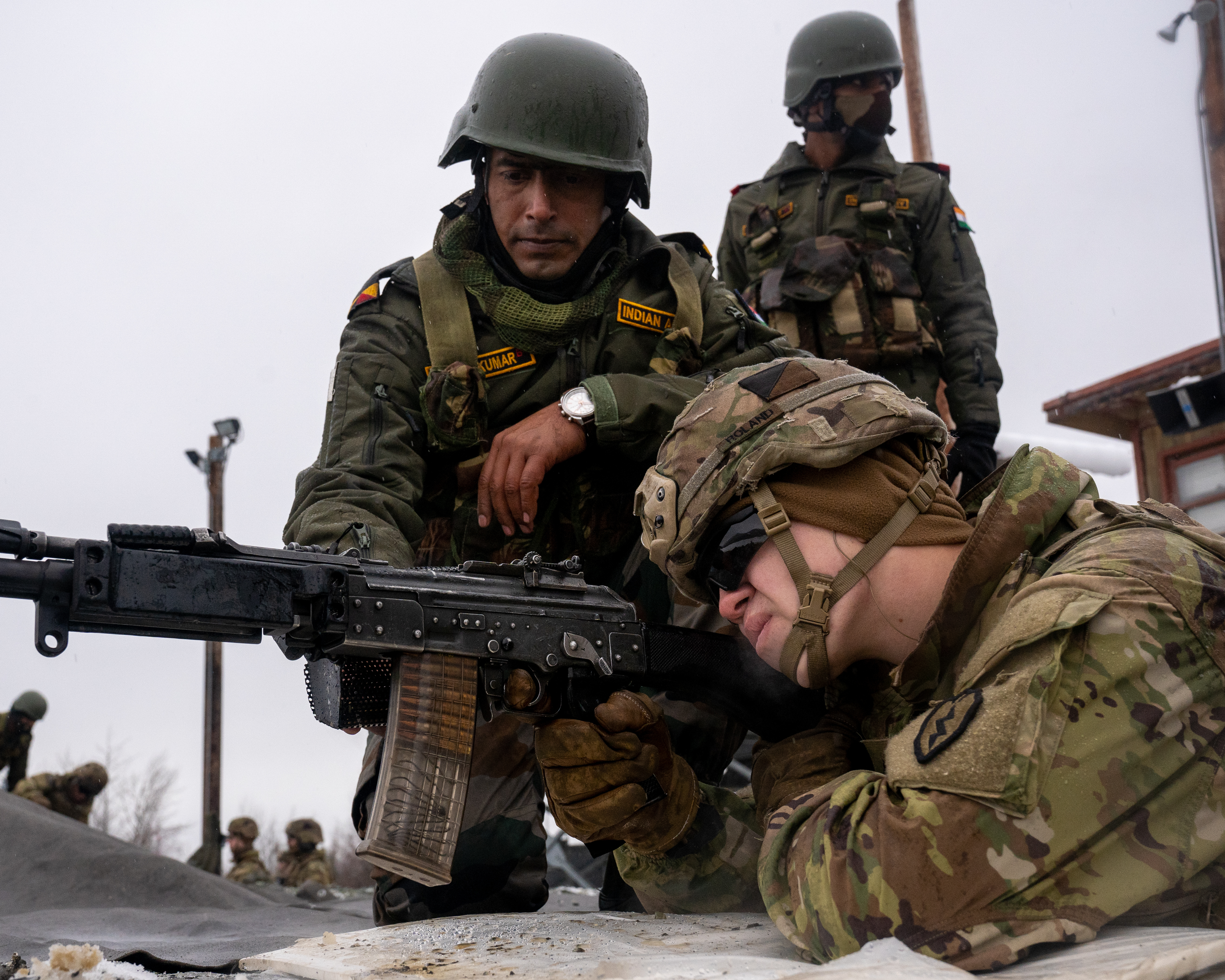
U.S. Army paratroopers and Indian Army troops familiarize each other with their respective weapons systems during exercise Yudh Abhyas 21 at Joint Base Elmendorf-Richardson, Alaska, Oct. 19, 2021.

From 16 November to 1 December 2022, the 18th edition of the exercise was conducted in Auli, Uttarakhand, India. This edition included US Army soldiers of 2nd Brigade of the 11th Airborne Division and Indian Army soldiers from the Assam Regiment. The exercise also focused on Humanitarian Assistance and Disaster Relief (HADR) operations.

The 19th joint exercise was held in 2023 in Fort Wainwright, Alaska.

The 2024 (20th) edition of the exercise was the largest till then with each side contributing 600 soldiers. M142 HIMARS and Stryker of the US Army also featured in the exercise. The exercise took place from 9 to 24 September 2024 at Foreign Training Node in Mahajan Field Firing Range, Rajasthan. Indian Army was represented by X Corps which is under the aegis of South Western Command. The primary focus of the exercise was counter-terrorism operations along with artillery, heavy machine gun firing and operations of attack helicopters like Apache, Prachand and Rudra.

The 21st edition was hosted by the US Army in Fort Wainwright, Alaska between 1 and 14 September 2025. While Indian Army was represented by 400 troops from all arms and services and led by the Madras Regiment, the US was deploy 1st Battalion, 5th Infantry Regiment ('Bobcat'), 1st Infantry Brigade Combat Team ('Arctic Wolves'), 11th Airborne Division. The US Army was expected to demonstrate the new amphibious variant of Stryker. The exercise will cover multiple aspects of modern warfare including heliborne operations, employment of surveillance resources and unmanned aerial systems, mountain warfare, CASEVAC as well as integrated deployment of Artillery, Aviation and Electronic Warfare equipment.

The 22nd edition was hosted in Auli Foreign Training Node, Uttarakhand and Mahajan Field Firing Range, Rajasthan between 15 and 28 September 2026. The opening ceremony was hosted in Auli and was attended by Colonel Benjamin Jackman, the commanding officer of the 1st Infantry Brigade Combat Team ('Arctic Wolves'), 11th Airborne Division and Major General Amaresh Gunjan, the commanding officer of the 14 RAPID, II Corps. Both sides deployed 600 personnel while 14 RAPID was represented by troops from an Integrated Battle Group. The armies are employing drones and other autonomous equipment for surveillance and reconnaissance. The U.S. deployed the Mobile-Low, Slow, Small Unmanned Aircraft Integrated Defeat System (MLIDS). Command Post Exercise, Field Training Exercise and Combined Live-Fire Demonstration were part of the exercise. The live fire demonstration included the deployment M777 howitzer of the Indian Army followed by a lecture-cum-demonstration.

== See also ==
- Indian Armed Forces
- US Armed Forces
- Malabar (naval exercise)
- Tiger Triumph
- Cope India
- Red Flag – Alaska
