= Vairengte =

- Town
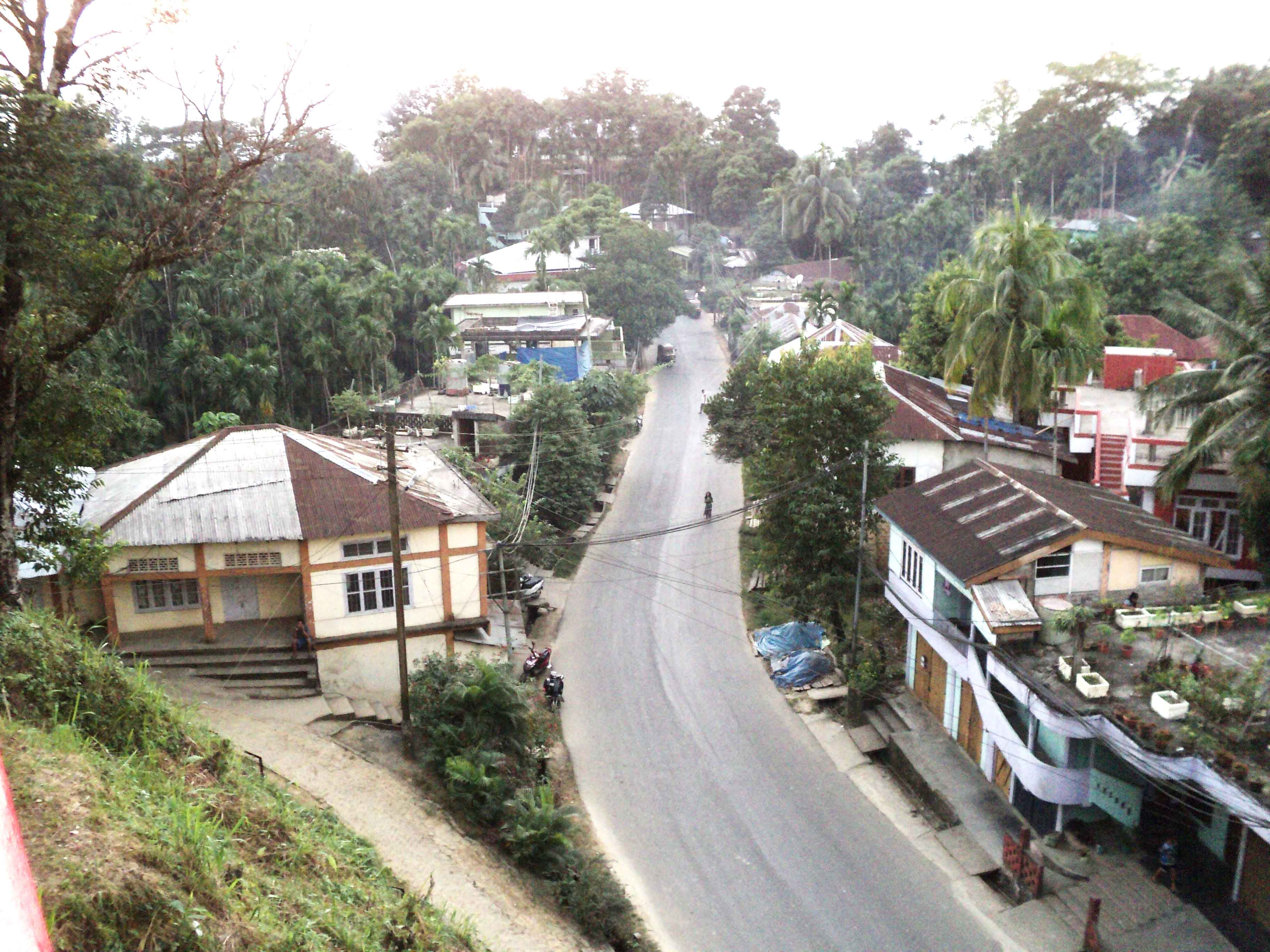
- Banglaveng, Vairengte

- Location in Mizoram, India Vairengte (India)
- Coordinates: 24.500073°N 92.763796°E
- Country: India
- State: Mizoram
- District: Kolasib
- Established: 1900

Population (2011)
  - Total: 10,545

Languages
  - Official: Mizo
- Time zone: UTC+5:30 (IST)
- Postal code: 796101
- Telephone code: +91 (0) 3837

Vairengte is a town located in the Kolasib district of the Indian state of Mizoram. It is situated in the northeastern part of the state, at the border with the state of Assam. Vairengte is known for being the location of the Counter Insurgency and Jungle Warfare School (CIJWS), which is operated by the Indian Army. Due to its strategic location at the Assam-Mizoram border and its association with the CIJWS, Vairengte holds a unique position in the state of Mizoram.

== Demographics ==
As of the 2011 Census of India, The total population in Vairengte town is 6,554. There are 3,149 males; There are 3,305 females.

The population of children aged 0-6 is 1441 which is 13.65 % of total population of Vairengte. the female sex ratio is 868, which is lower than the Mizoram's state average 976. Moreover the child sex ratio is around 1013, which is higher than the state average of 970. literacy rate of Vairengte city is 94.73 % higher than the state average of 91.33 %. male literacy is around 95.24 % while the female literacy rate is 94.14 %.

There are 1,931 House Holds in Vairengte.

=== Religion ===
As of 2011 census, there are 83.51% Christians, 10.44% Hindus, 5.44% Muslims and 0.61% others including Buddhist and Sikhs.

Religions in Vairengte
Religion	Percent
Christian	83.51%
Hindus	10.44%
Muslims	5.44%
Others†	0.61%

== Media ==
The Major Newspaper in Vairengte are Vairengte Aw:

== CIJWS ==
The original plans to set up a counter-insurgency unit to train soldiers came about following the government response to the Mizo militancy in the 1960s. Field Marshal Sam Manekshaw, then the General Officer Commanding-in-Chief (GOC-IN-C) of the Indian Army's Eastern Command, was the first proponent for the institute.

The success of this school prompted the establishment of another counter-insurgency training centre, the Kaziranga Special Jungle Warfare Training School in Assam.

== Education ==
- Counterinsurgency and Jungle Warfare School (CIJWS) is a training and research establishment of the Indian Army specialising in unconventional warfare, especially counter-insurgency and guerrilla warfare. CIJW is one of the premier counter-insurgency training institutions in the world.

== See also ==
- Tourism in North East India
