= Scouts (paramilitary) =

Military class of the British Empire

Scouts (and levies and militia) in the British Empire meant a locally raised standing paramilitary, not part of the British Army or British Indian Army, under the command of a local Chief or commissioner, but with attached British officers. Scouts were internal and border security units composed of locals, officered by British officers.

== British India ==
Scouts (including Militias and Levies) were locally raised standing forces responsible for security and border control usually in border areas, these forces were under local control but were financed in whole or part by the Raj.

== Modern India ==
All are locally raised standing high mountain and border security units of the Indian Army, they are composed of locally recruited personnel.

- Arunachal Scouts, part of Assam Regiment
- Dogra Scouts, part of the Dogra Regiment
- Kumaon Scouts, part of the Kumaon Regiment
- Garhwal Scouts, part of the Garhwal Rifles
- Sikkim Scouts, raised for the state of Sikkim, affiliated with 11th Gorkha Rifles
- Ladakh Scouts, for the Ladakh region

== Pakistan ==
Scouts in Pakistan are part of the Frontier Corps (1878), inherited from British India, with the sole exception being the Gilgit−Baltistan Scouts, a recently raised (2003) border and internal security force under the direct control of the Pakistani Ministry of the Interior.

The following list of scouts includes their year of founding if known.

- Bajaur Scouts (1961)
- Chaman Scouts (1946)
- Chitral Scouts (1903)
- Dasht Scouts (2018)
- Ghazaband Scouts (1977)
- Gilgit Scouts (1913 - 1975) (integrated into the Northern Light Infantry of the Pakistan Army).
- Kalat Scouts (1965)
- Karakoram Scouts (1964), merged into the Northern Light Infantry in 1975
- Khattak Scouts
- Loralai Scouts (1977)
- Loran Scouts
- Mekran/Makran Scouts (1974)
- Qilla Abdullah Scouts (2005) (previously the Bolan Scouts)
- Sibi Scouts (1971)
- South Waziristan Scouts (1900)
- Thal Scouts (1948)
- Tochi Scouts (1894)
- Pakistan Levies

== Somaliland ==
- Somaliland Scouts, an internal and border security force in British Somaliland

== Trucial States ==
- Trucial Oman Scouts, formed in 1951 as the Trucial Oman Levies, an internal and border security force, it was renamed and expanded in 1956 as the Trucial Oman Scouts, and later became the Union Defense Force of the United Arab Emirates.

== See also ==
- Schutztruppe - security forces for Imperial German colonies

== Notes ==
This article incorporates text from this source, which is in the public domain. Country Studies. Federal Research Division.
