= Badar Rifles =

- Urdu: بَدر رائفلز
- Founded: August 2015
- Country: Pakistan
- Allegiance: Civil Armed Forces
- Branch: Frontier Corps Khyber Pakhtunkhwa (South)
- Type: Scouts
- Role: Border Patrol; Law Enforcement
- Size: 6 Wings
- Part of: Sector HQ South-West
- Headquarters: Spinwam
- Nickname: BR
- Motto: Pashto: د الله زمریان (The Lions of Allah)
- Engagements: War on terror; Insurgency in Khyber Pakhtunkhwa; 2025 Afghanistan–Pakistan conflict

The Badar Rifles is a paramilitary unit of the Frontier Corps KPK-South.

== History ==
The unit was founded on an ad hoc basis in August 2015 at South Waziristan as a single winged unit under the command of Colonel R. M. Saddique-Ur-Rehman of the Pakistan Army with its initial makeshift headquarters at Mirali. Over the years, the unit was expanded with establishments of new wings. In June 2016, its HQ was shifted from Mirali to its own dedicated headquarters at the Spinwam Fort. The unit was officially raised as the Bhittani Rifles on 12 August 2017 however it got renamed as the Badar Rifles in 2020.

== Overview ==
=== Commandants ===
Rank	Name	Begin date	End date	Notes
Colonel	Rana M. Saddique Rehman	2015	2017	
Colonel	Tahir Hameed	2017	2019	
Colonel	Anzar Hassan	2019	2020	
Colonel	Sheheryar	2020	2022	
Brigadier	Anjum Riaz	2022	2023	
Brigadier	Iftikhar Ahmed	2023	Present	

=== Wings ===
The Badar Rifles is presently made up of 6 wings.

- 241 Wing
- 242 Wing
- 243 Wing
- 244 Wing
- 245 Wing
- 246 Wing

=== Gallantry Awards ===
Image	Name	Amount	Notes
	Tamgha-i-Basalat	21	
	Imtiazi Sanad	6	

== See also ==
- Frontier Corps
- Territorial Defence Forces (Ukraine)
- Bajaur Scouts
- Khyber Rifles
