= Tsewang Tharchin =

Indian ex-serviceman and social activist

- Born: 1978; Skurbuchan, Ladakh, Jammu and Kashmir
- Died: 24 September 2025 (aged 46–47); Leh, Ladakh, India
- Cause of death: Police firing on protestors
- Military career
- Rank: Hawaldar
- Unit: Ladakh Scouts
- Other work: Social worker

Tsewang Tharchin (1978 – 24 September 2025) was an Indian ex-serviceman and social worker from Ladakh. He was known for his military service and community work in the Ladakh region, and later became active in movements demanding statehood and constitutional safeguards for Ladakh. He was killed during a protest in Leh in September 2025.

== Early life and education ==
Tharchin was born as the first of seven children to his father Stanzin Namgyal in 1978 in Skurbuchan village of Zanskar, a remote valley in Ladakh.

He grew up in a traditional Ladakhi family and was educated locally before joining the 3 Ladakh Scouts Regiment of the Indian armed forces.

Tharchin's father Stanzin also served in the Ladakh Scouts for 32 years and participated in Kargil War, before retiring as a captain in 2002.

== Career ==
Tharchin joined the Indian Army in 1996 and became a hawaldar in the Ladakh Scouts until 2017, he served in the Kargil War in 1999 and later became active in ex-servicemen's networks in Ladakh.

After leaving the Army, he returned to civilian life, he started a garment shop in Leh and engaged in social and community initiatives. He supported welfare activities for veterans and their families and worked to encourage education and youth participation in sports and public service.

== Death and aftermath ==
On 24 September 2025, Tharchin participated in a hunger strike organised by the Leh Apex Body in Leh. The protest, which had begun peacefully, escalated into clashes with security forces. Tharchin was among the four individuals killed during the unrest.

His death prompted widespread condemnation from various quarters, including local political groups and human rights organisations.

Tharchin's last rites were performed on 29 September 2025 in Leh town, under very high security and curfew. Only close relatives and a few members of the Ladakh Apex Body, were allowed to attend the final rite.

He is survived by his wife and four children.
