= Gomal Scouts =

- Urdu: گومال اسکاؤٹس
- Founded: 10 July 2007; 18 years ago
- Country: Pakistan
- Allegiance: Civil Armed Forces
- Type: Scouts
- Role: Law Enforcement
- Size: 6 Wings
- Part of: FC KPK (S)
- Headquarters: Manzai Fort
- Nickname: GS
- Motto: Pashto: توريالی (The Sword Bearers)
- Engagements: War on terror; Insurgency in Khyber Pakhtunkhwa; 2025 Afghanistan–Pakistan conflict; Operation Ghazab Lil Haq

Commanders
- Notable commanders: Colonel Bashir Ahmed

The Gomal Scouts is a paramilitary unit of Pakistan's Frontier Corps. The unit's main role is responding to domestic emergencies, such as natural disasters, civil unrest, counter terrorism and Domestic security missions of Jandola, Manzai and Mana Gurbaz areas in Pakistan's Khyber Pakhtunkhwa province.

== History ==
The unit was raised as Jandola Scouts at Manzai Fort by Colonel Bashir Ahmed on 10 July 2007. It was renamed a number of times which included Khushal Khattak Scouts in 2008, Khattak Scouts in 2010 and finally its current designation, the Gomal Scouts in 2020.

== Overview ==
=== Commandants ===
Rank	Name	Begin date	End date	Notes
Colonel	Bashir Ahmad	2007	2009	
Colonel	Ghulam Jilani	2009	2011	
Colonel	Rifat Khan	2011	2012	
Colonel	Muhammad Naeem	2012	2013	
Colonel	Waseem Ijaz	2013	2015	
Colonel	Rizwan Butt	2015	2017	
Colonel	Asghar Ali	2017	2019	
Colonel	Mazhar Hussain	2019	2021	
Colonel	Muhammad Jhangiz	2021	2023	
Colonel	Mueen Ahmed	2023	Present	

=== Wings ===
The Gomal Scouts is presently made up of 6 wings.

=== Gallantry Awards ===
Image	Name	Amount	Notes
	Tamgha-i-Basalat	18	
	Imtiazi Sanad	10	

== See also ==
- Frontier Corps Khyber Pakhtunkhwa (South)
