= Lowang =

Lowang may refer to:

- Wangki Lowang, Indian politician
- Wangpha Lowang, Indian politician

== See also ==
- Borduria, Tirap district
- Nocte people
- Shadow Warrior (1997 video game)
