= Subansiri River bridge =

Subansiri river bridge is built over the Subansiri river in Arunachal Pradesh near the Line of Actual Control (LAC) by the Border Road Organization (BRO). Due to Covid restrictions the opening ceremony led by the Chief Minister of Arunachal pradesh, Pema Khandu occurred via video conferencing. The Bridge plays a crucial role in connecting Daporijo and other villages present on either side of Subansiri river as it is the only medium of communication between them. This 430 feet bridge required reconstruction, and after the approval, construction started on 17 March 2020 and was completed on 14 April 2020 in record 27 days. The reconstructed bridge capacity is 40 tonnes, compared to 24 tonnes for the original bridge. The bridge is named after Hangpan Dada, the martyr who lost his life fighting terrorists in Jammu & Kashmir region.
