= Assam Regiment =

Regiment of the Indian Army

- Insignia of the Assam Regiment
- Active: 15 June 1941 – present
- Country: India
- Branch: Indian Army
- Type: Infantry
- Size: 25 battalions
- Regimental Centre: Happy Valley, Shillong, Meghalaya, India
- Nickname: The Rhinos'
- Motto: Asam Vikram (Unique Valour)
- War Cry: Rhino Charge
- March: Regimental Song: Badluram Ka Badan
- Anniversaries: 15 June (Raising Day)
- Engagements: World War II, Indo-Pakistani War of 1947–1948, Sino-Indian War of 1962, Indo-Pakistani War of 1965, Indo-Pakistani War of 1971, United Nations Transitional Authority in Cambodia, 1992, Operation Vijay (Kargil War), 1999, Operation Parakram, 2002 (Stand-off), United Nations Organization Stabilization Mission in the Democratic Republic of the Congo, United Nations Interim Force in Lebanon, 2020 China–India skirmishes
- Decorations: 1 Ashoka Chakra, 5 Param Vishisht Seva Medal, 2 Maha Vir Chakra, 7 Kirti Chakra, 5 Vir Chakras, 19 Shaurya Chakras, 2 Padma Shris, 5 Ati Vishisht Seva Medals, 6 Yudh Seva Medals, 51Sena Medals and 20 Vishisht Seva Medals and 2 Bars

Commanders
- Colonel of the Regiment: Lt Gen Abhijit S. Pendharkar
- Notable commanders: Major General S. C. Barbora, Padma Shri Brig BC Pandey, Brig. Thenphunga Sailo, AVSM, Lt Gen Balwant Singh Negi, PVSM, UYSM, YSM, SM, VSM*, ADC

Insignia
- Regimental Insignia: One-horned Rhino
- Colors: Black, Scarlet, Green and Gold

The Assam Regiment is an infantry regiment of the Indian Army. The regiment consists of 25 battalions: 15 regular battalions, 3 Rashtriya Rifles battalions, 5 Territorial Army battalions (including 2 ecological battalions) and 2 Arunachal Scouts battalions. It recruits exclusively from all the eight Northeastern states of India.

== History ==
Raising

The regiment was raised on 15 June 1941 in Shillong by Major (later Brigadier) Ross Cosens Howman OBE to meet the claim of the then undivided state of Assam for its own fighting unit and to counter the threat of the Japanese invasion of India. The area of Elephant Falls in Shillong was chosen to raise the first battalion and it was there, under British instructors, that the first troops were trained. The initial draft of the regiment was drawn from undivided Assam, and consisted of the doughty Ahoms of Assam who had proved their martial prowess by defeating the Mughals at the Battle of Saraighat. The Assam Rifles provided a trained nucleus of 500 JCOs, NCOs and men to raise the newly formed regiment. The hardy, tough and cheerful Misings, Boros, Nagas, Kukis, Khasis, Karbi, Garos, Meiteis and later on, the Adis, Nishis, Monpas, other tribes of Arunachal Pradesh, northeast India domiciled Gorkhas and Sikkimese and other tribes were also drafted into the regiment and, today, the regiment can boast of being composed of troops of diverse customs, cultures, languages, traditions and ethos belonging to all the eight Northeastern states of India. Two battalions currently also have Dogras, Garhwalis, Gorkhas and South Indian classes.

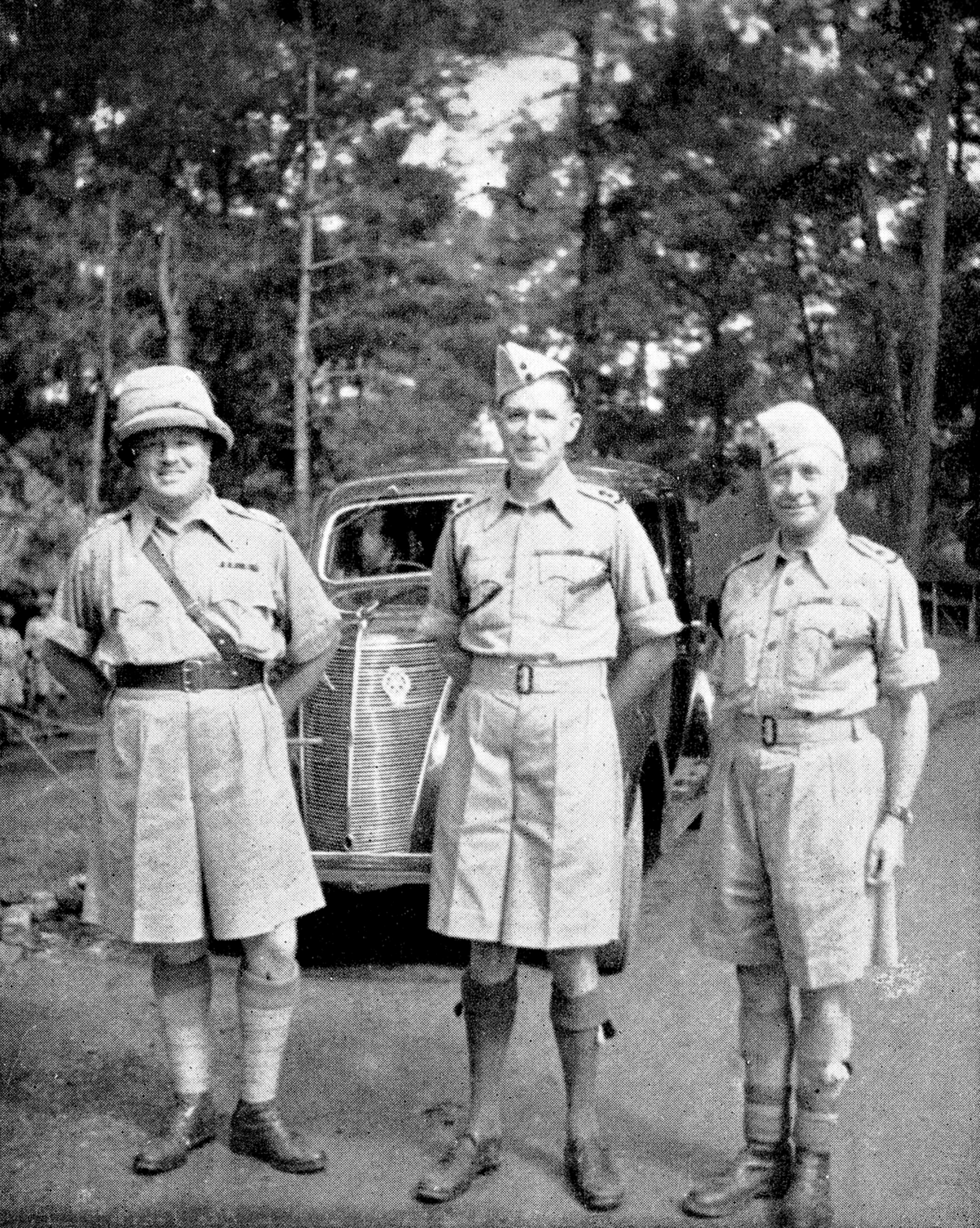
Men who helped to raise the Assam Regiment in 1941. Left to right: Mr. RGR Cumming, Inspector General of Police Assam, Brigadier Ross Howman, and Lieutenant Colonel William Felix “Bruno” Brown.

World War II

Within six months of its raising, the regiment was ordered to move to Digboi to defend the oil fields. In early 1942, it moved to Ledo and was involved in reconnoitering the alignment for the famous Stilwell Road. In 1944, when the invasion of India by Japan was imminent, the regiment was moved to Jessami and Kharasom to delay the advance of the Japanese 31st Division. The young regiment under the command of Lieutenant Colonel William Felix “Bruno” Brown soon proved its capabilities within three years of its raising, at the consecutive battles of Jessami, the epic defence of Kohima and the capture of Aradura, all of which were awarded as battle honours (now known as pre-independence battle honours) to the regiment. The regiment earned high praise for its combat skills in World War II. In its first operation, the regiment won 71 gallantry awards. In addition, the regiment won six battle honours including Jessami, Kohima, Aradura, Toungoo, Kyaukmyaung bridge-head and Mawlaik. It was also awarded the theatre honour Burma: 1942–45. Seldom has a regiment won so many gallantry awards, battle honours and theatre awards in a single campaign.

Indo-Pakistani war of 1947–1948

3 ASSAM participated in the operations in the first war after independence.

Sino-Indian War, 1962

4 ASSAM was deployed during the war against China.

Indo-Pakistani war of 1971

2 and 5 ASSAM were deployed in Jammu and Kashmir during the war. 3 and 4 ASSAM were in Punjab in the western front, while 6 ASSAM, the Assam Regimental Centre and 119 TA were in the eastern sector. Troops from the regiment took part in the battles of Chhamb, Fazilka and Uri in the west and Balurghat / Hilli and Dawki sectors in the east. 5 ASSAM lost 5 officers and 19 other ranks during the war. The unit was awarded the battle honour of Chhamb. 3 ASSAM lost 4 officers, 3 JCOs and 31 other ranks during the battle at Fazilka.

Operation Blue Star, 1984

1, 6, 8 and 10 ASSAM were involved in the operations to neutralise the terrorists in the Golden Temple at Amritsar.

Operation Meghdoot

Since 1984, many units of the regiment have been deployed in the Siachen Glacier, the highest battlefield in the world. They include 5 (1984), 2 (1985), 3 (1986), 14 (1992-4), 15 (1997-8), 4 (1999-2000), 14 (2003-5), 1 (2012–14) and 12 ASSAM (2018–19).

Operation Falcon

7, 10 and 12 ASSAM were instrumental in withdrawal of the Chinese troops during the Sumdorong Chu standoff in 1986.

Operation Avert

3 and 14 ASSAM helped the Punjab Police with the border sealing operations in 1987-88 to control the infiltration of terrorists from across the border.

Operation Pawan

Two battalions (4 and 7 ASSAM) were part of the Indian Peace Keeping Forces in Sri Lanka in 1988.

Operation Vijay

The following units were deployed during the Kargil War. 1 ASSAM was deployed in the Machhal sector between 2000-1, 9 ASSAM was at Kupwara between 2000-2, 9 ASSAM was at Tangdhar from 1998-2000, 15 ASSAM at Gandharbal and Uri between 1998-9. 35 Rashtriya Rifles was in Badgam sector, 42 Rashtriya Rifles was at Chowkibal-Treghgam and then in Tral sectors. 119 TA was deployed for road opening duties and for protection of 15 Corps headquarters.

Operation Parakram

3, 4, 6 and 7 ASSAM were deployed in the western sector as part of the mobilisation of troops following the attack on the Indian Parliament in December 2001.

United Nations operations

- 1 ASSAM was deployed in Cambodia between June 1992 and March 1993 as part of the United Nations Transitional Authority in Cambodia (UNTAC).
- 15 ASSAM was deployed as INBATT-VII in south Lebanon as part of United Nations Interim Force in Lebanon (UNIFIL) between June 2004 and December 2005.
- 10 ASSAM was part of United Nations Mission in the Democratic Republic of Congo (MONUC) between January and December 2008.

Counter-insurgency operations

The regiment has taken part in counter insurgency operations in Jammu and Kashmir and in the North East.

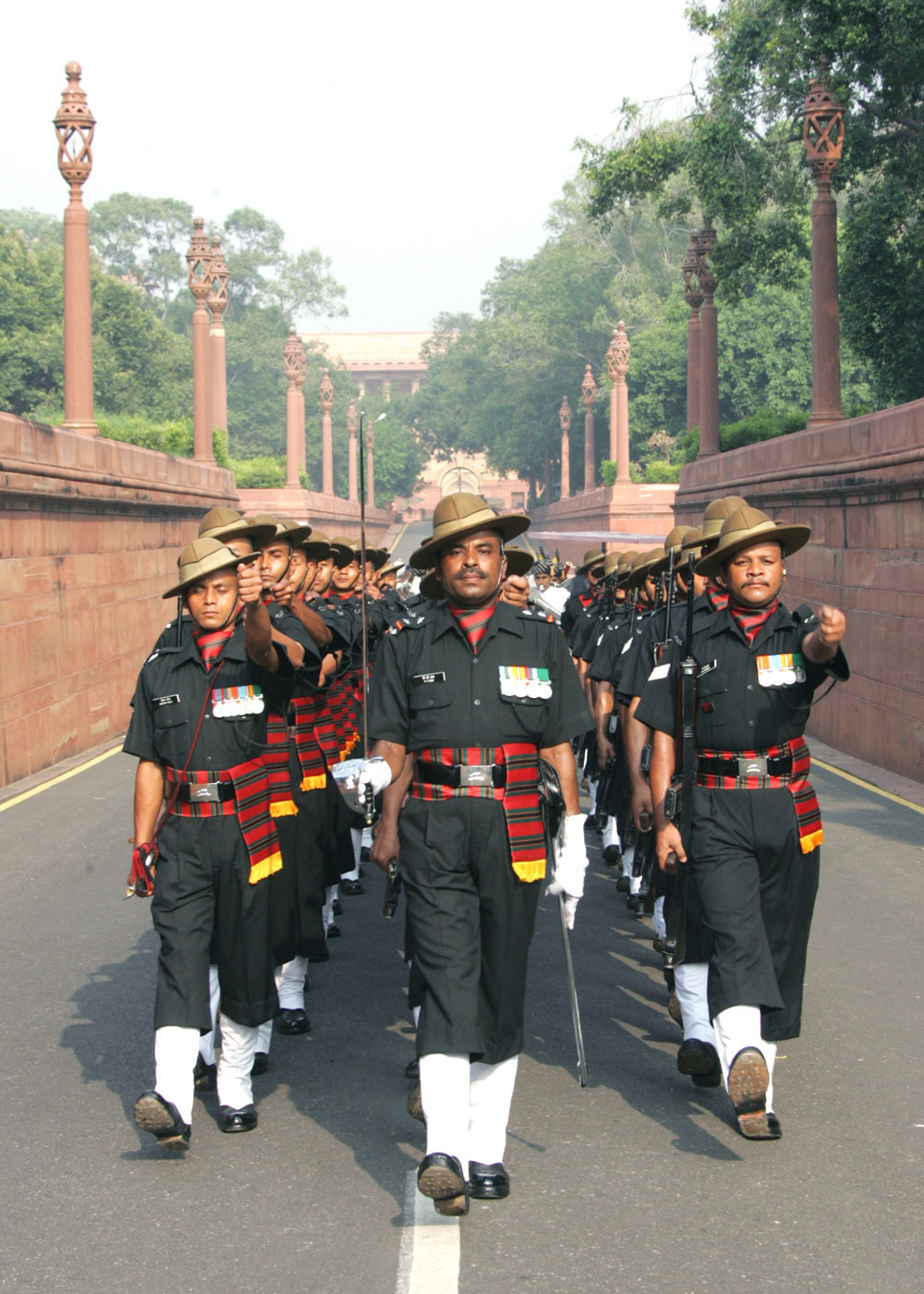
6 ASSAM taking charge of ceremonial duties at Rashtrapati Bhavan, July 2006

Others

6 ASSAM has performed ceremonial duties at Rashtrapati Bhavan and was selected for its outstanding work in counter terrorist operations. 14 ASSAM won the Division and Command Football Championships and had fielded four players for the Army Reds & Greens. It had also won the first position in the Division Cambrian Patrol Championship 2009–2010. 10 ASSAM won the division firing and sniper competition for the year 2011–2012. The contingent of the Assam Regiment was judged "Best Marching Contingent" thrice in the Republic Day celebrations held at Delhi in 1995, 2004 and 2016. The team of the Assam Regimental Centre won the 'Army Young Blood Firing Championship' in 2005 and stood second in 2006.

12 ASSAM conducted outstanding Counter-insurgency Operations in Arunachal Pradesh, from Mar 2012-Jun 2015, arresting 48 militants, killing 4, seizing 37 weapons and taking 7 surrenders. The battalion also had an outstanding performance in sports and won the 'Best in Sports' trophy in 2015.

In 2019, the 8 ASSAM participated in Yudh Abhyas 2019, representing India, along the US Army. 9 ASSAM was part of the exercise in 2022.

In 2020, 12 ASSAM was deployed in the Chinese border and 17 ASSAM was deployed in Ladakh as a part of additional forces.

== Heraldry ==
The regiment's insignia is the one-horned rhino over a scroll underneath depicting the words 'Assam Regt'. The insignia is worn on the berets and belts that the soldiers (the self-named "Rhinos") wear. In India, rhinos are found in the state of Assam which is also known for its tea gardens and oil refineries.

The regimental colours are black and gold (the colours of undivided Assam) and scarlet (the colour of the infantry). Rank badges are coloured silver and black.

The regimental salutation of tagra raho (stay strong/fit) is unique in the Indian Army. This unique greeting adopted by the regiment was introduced by Major General S.C. Barbora, who commanded 2 Assam Regiment in 1960s. Originally commissioned in 1 Assam Regiment, the Commanding Officer used to enquire about the morale of the Rhinos' (soldiers) by asking them "Tagra Hai?" ("are you strong/fit?") Invariably, the answer used to be "Tagra Hai Saheb" ("I am strong/fit, sir"). This greeting became popular very quickly.

The motto of the regiment is Asam Vikram, which means 'unique valour'. The war cry of the regiment is 'Rhino charge'. The regimental song is Badluram Ka Badan.

The regimental language at the time of its formation was Roman Urdu. The present language is Hindi. When spoken in the regiment, it is a unique mixture of Hindi sprinkled with words from all the northeastern languages and sounds cryptic to the uninitiated.

== Uniform ==
The regiment wears a hat, called the Rhino Hat, with the right side lowered, a Rhino with a black diamond-shaped flash on the left (Rhino facing front) and a black strap under the chin. The shoulder title reads "ASSAM". A ceremonial 'Dah' is also carried with the belt on ceremonial occasions.

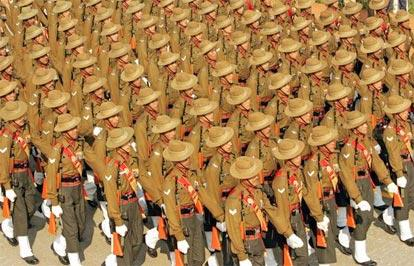
The Assam Regiment contingent at the Republic Day parade, 2006.

== Affiliations ==
- 106 Air Force Squadron - The Assam Regiment and Arunachal Scouts of Indian Army were affiliated with the 106 Air Force Squadron at Tezpur on 15 February 2021.

== Honours and awards ==
=== Theatre honours ===
Pre independence

- Burma - 1 ASSAM

Post independence

- J & K 1947–48 - 3 ASSAM
- J & K, 1971 - 5 ASSAM

=== Battle honours ===
The following units of the Assam Regiment have won the following honours

Pre independence

- Jessami, Aradura, Toungoo, Defence of Kohima, Kyaukmyaung Bridge, Mawlaik - 1 ASSAM

Post independence

- Chhamb, 1971 - 5 ASSAM

== Gallantry awards ==
The regiment has been awarded the following gallantry awards -

Pre-independence

- Distinguished Service Order - 2, Lieutenant Colonel WF Brown, Lieutenant Colonel EHM Parsons
- Order of the British Empire - 1, Lieutenant Colonel WF Brown
- Order of British India, 2nd Class - 1, Subedar Major Opin Chandra Mech
- Military Cross - 8, Major AI Calistan, Major Sidhiman Rai, Lieutenant JN Corlett, Lieutenant P Steyn, Major DE Lloyd Jones, Subedar Sarbeswar Rajbongshi, Subedar Khagendra Nath Gogoi, Jemadar Tonghem Kuki
- Indian Distinguished Service Medal - 2, Havildar Kandarpa Rajbongshi, Sepoy Wellington Massar
- Military Medal - 4, Naik Dilhu Angami, Naik Imtisang Ao, Sepoy Dunio Angami, Lance Naik Yambhamo Lotha
- Mentioned in dispatches - 28

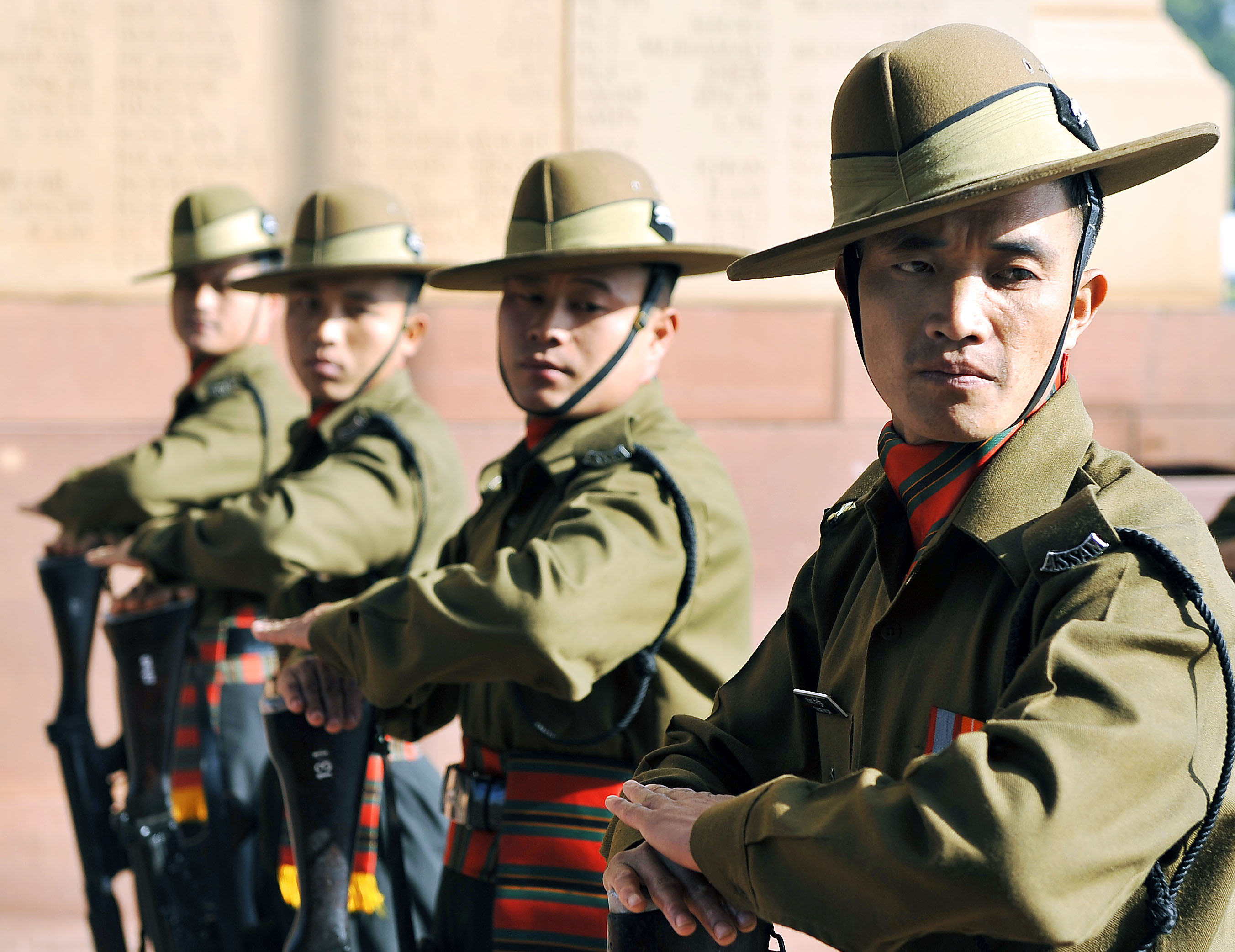
Soldiers of the Assam Regiment.

Post independence

- 1 Ashoka Chakra – 2016 - Havildar Hangpan Dada
- 9 Param Vishisht Seva Medals
- 2 Maha Vir Chakra - 2nd Lieutenant Rajeev Sandhu (posthumous), Major Sonam Wangchuk (while serving with Ladakh Scouts).
- 8 Kirti Chakra,
- 5 Vir Chakra,
- 20 Shaurya Chakras,
- 4 Padma Shri,
- 4 Ati Vishisht Seva Medals,
- 13 Yudh Seva Medals,
- 180 Sena Medals and
- 35 Vishisht Seva Medals.

== Regimental Centre ==
The regimental centre is located at Happy Valley in Shillong. The first commanding officer was Major Bola Singh Lama and the first Subedar Major of the centre was Subedar Major Kaliprasad Khatri. The centre, which is known as the "Cradle of Northeastern Martial Prowess", became the first regimental centre to be awarded the GOC-in-C, Unit Citation in 2011.

== Regimental battalions ==
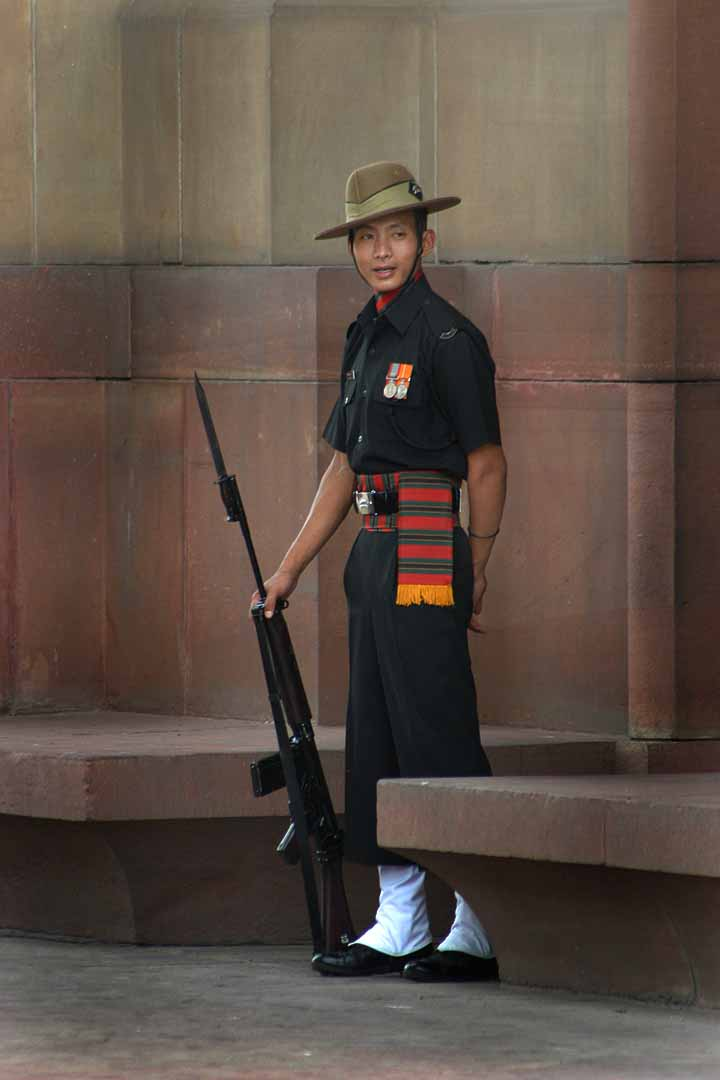
An Assam Regiment soldier on guard at India Gate, New Delhi.

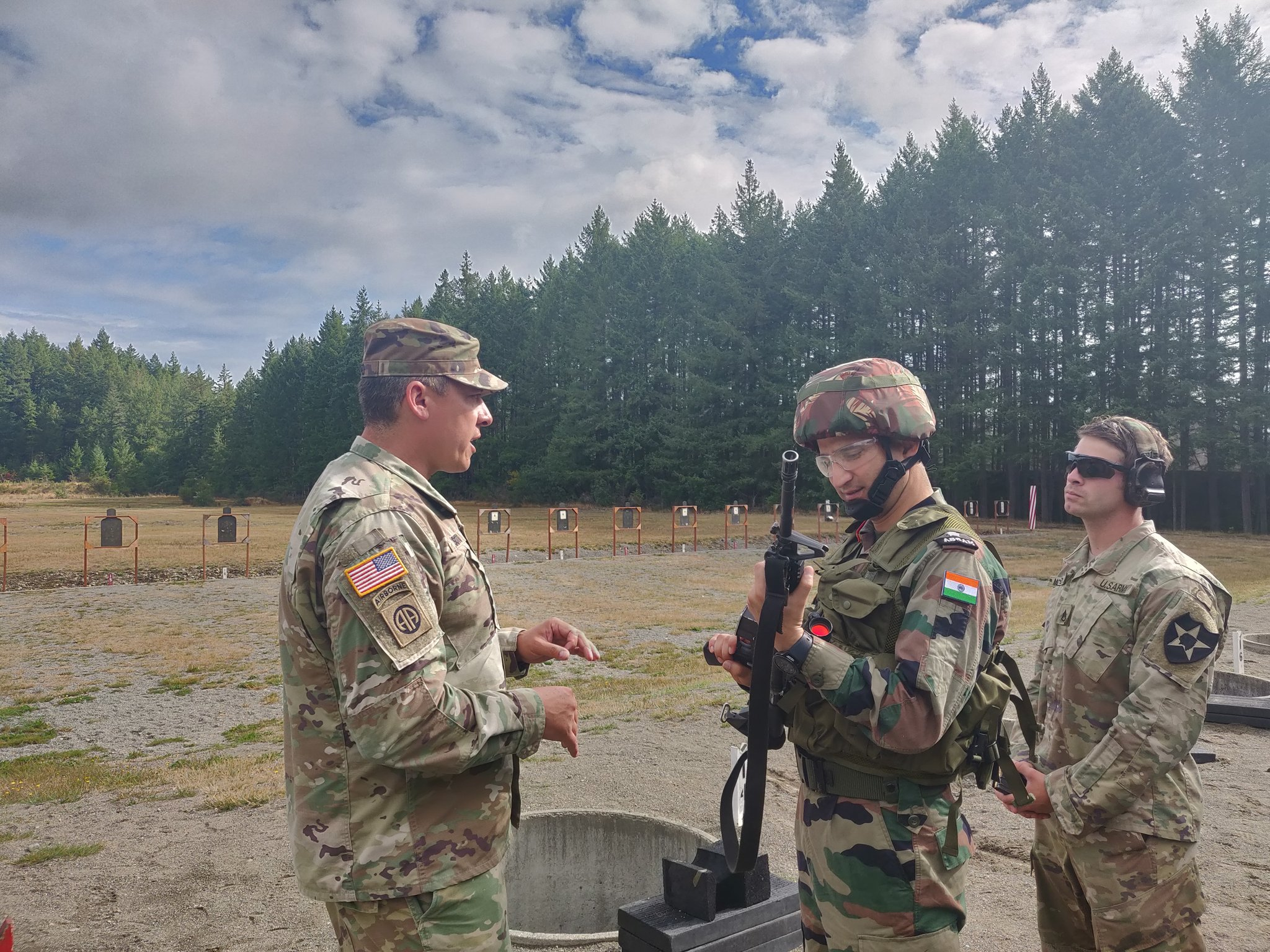
Personnel from Assam Regiment during Yudh Abhyas exercise in 2019

Battalion	Raising Date	Nickname	Remarks	References
1st Battalion	15 June 1941	Always First	Raised at Shillong by Major RC Howman	
2nd Battalion	1 October 1963	Second to None	Raised by Lieutenant Colonel IN Macleod on 15 April 1942, re-raised on 1 October 1963 at Shillong under Major MS Behl. Lieutenant Colonel SC Barbosa was the first commanding officer.	
3rd Battalion	1 November 1945	Phantom Third	Raised by Lieutenant Colonel FRS Cosens	
4th Battalion	1 October 1960	Formidable Fourth	Raised by Lieutenant Colonel T Sailo at Shillong	
5th Battalion	1 November 1963	Fighting Fifth, Chhamb Battalion	Raised by Lieutenant Colonel SS Chowdhary at Shillong	
6th Battalion	1 April 1964	Sabre Sixth	Raised by Lieutenant Colonel Balwan Singh at Shillong	
7th Battalion	1 January 1976	Striking Seventh, MVC Paltan	Raised by Lieutenant Colonel P Shivpuri at Tamulpur	
8th Battalion	1 March 1978	Head Hunters, Tigers of Lolab	Raised by Lieutenant Colonel YP Singh at Rangapahar	
9th Battalion	1 August 1980	Nimble Ninth	Raised by Lieutenant Colonel JR Mukherjee at Shillong	
10th Battalion	1 January 1981	Thundering Tenth	Raised by Lieutenant Colonel MS Jamwal at Shillong	
12th Battalion	11 February 1985	Daring Dozen	Raised by Lieutenant Colonel JS Antal at Shillong	
14th Battalion	15 October 1985	Ferocious Fourteenth	Raised by Colonel Gurdip Singh at Shillong	
15th Battalion	15 July 1987	One Five	Raised by Lieutenant Colonel BK Gandhi at Shillong	
16th Battalion	15 February 2010	Soaring Sixteen	Raised by Colonel Harjot Singh at Shillong	
17th Battalion	1 September 2011	Saggital Ek Saat	Raised by Colonel Avanish Singhal at Umroi Military Station	
119 Infantry Battalion (TA)	1949	Assam Terriers	Shillong, Meghalaya	
165 Infantry Battalion (TA) (Home & Hearth)	1 November 2005	Manipur Terriers	Imphal, Manipur	
166 Infantry Battalion (TA) (Home & Hearth)	2006	Tezpur Terriers	Tezpur, Assam	
134 Infantry Battalion (TA) (Eco-Task Force)	20 September 2007	Jungle Warriors, Eastern Planters	Rangiya, Assam	
135 Infantry Battalion (TA) (Eco-Task Force)	2008	Green Rhinos	Sonitpur, Assam	
35 Rashtriya Rifles	1 September 1994			
42 Rashtriya Rifles	1 March 2001			
59 Rashtriya Rifles	31 March 2004			
1 Arunachal Scouts	10 November 2010		Raised at Shillong	
2 Arunachal Scouts	1 June 2013		Raised at Umroi Cantt under Colonel Neelesh Anand Pagulwar	

== See also ==
- Assam Rifles
- Badluram Ka Badan
- List of regiments of the Indian Army

== Bibliography ==
- Steyn, Captain Peter (1959) The History Of The Assam Regiment, Volume 1, Orient Longmans Pvt Ltd
- Pillai, Lieutenant General SK (2004) Asam Vikram - Unique Valour - History of the Assam Regiment 1947-2002, Macmillan India, Delhi
- Sailo, Subedar Lalthanmawia (1990) Indopui Pahnihna - 1st Assam Regiment (Mizo), Arbee Publication, Aizwal
