= Badluram Ka Badan =

Indian military regimental song

"Badluram Ka Badan" ("Badluram's Body") is the regimental song of the Assam Regiment of the Indian Army. Major M. F. Proktor created the song in honour of Rifleman Badluram, a soldier of the Assam Regiment of the British Indian Army who died while fighting against the Imperial Japanese Army in World War II. After Badluram's death, the quartermaster Sub Kandarpa Rajbongshi IDSM (Indian Distinguished Service Medal) did not remove his name from the rations roster and the company continued to draw rations in Badluram's name. This extra ration helped the company survive through a siege when Japanese troops surrounded them during the Battle of Kohima and supplies were cut. Accordingly, the song was composed in Badluram's honour with the lyrics "We get rations because Badluram's body is buried beneath".

== Background ==
Assam Regiment Insignia

Badluram was a rifleman in the 1st Battalion, Assam Regiment of the British Indian Army. In 1944 the 1st Assam Regiment was posted in and around Kohima and were part of the first line of defence between the Fifteenth Army, a formation of the Imperial Japanese Army led by Lt. Gen. Renya Mutaguchi, and the rest of British India. In what would go on to be labelled "Britain's Greatest Battle" by a popular vote conducted by the British National Army Museum, the Battle of Kohima and the Battle of Imphal was also called the "British-Indian Thermopylae" by Earl Louis Mountbatten, the Supreme Allied Commander in the theatre, and is also referred to as "Stalingrad of the East".

Badluram was killed in the early days of the battle from a gunshot wound. After Badluram's death, the quartermaster did not remove his name from the rations roster and the company continued to draw rations in Badluram's name. (Some say the Quartermaster purposely did not report Badluram's death while others say he forgot to. Poor wireless connectivity routinely hampered our ability to request additional supplies.) But by 6 April, the Japanese troops of the Fifteenth Army had Kohima under siege, and supply lines were cut. A 1st Royal Berkshires company commander at the time penned down in this diary "Water was short and restricted to about one pint per man per day [...] Air supply was the key, but the steep terrain and narrow ridges meant that some of the drops went to the Japs". The Japanese also brought anti-aircraft guns with them, breaking the supply chain even more.

For Badluram's company, because of the extra supplies that had been arriving in the days leading up to the siege, things were easier. This extra ration helped the company survive through the siege. The song was composed in his honour with the lyrics "Badluram ka badan zameen ka neeche hai/ toh humey uska ration milta hai" ("Since Badluram's body is buried, we receive his rations"). Created in 1946 by Major M. T. Proktor, the song was inspired by and set to the tune of "John Brown's Body" – "Battle Hymn of the Republic". It has become the regimental song of the Assam Regiment, and is sung by Assam Regiment recruits at their attestation parade in Shillong. In September 2019, a video emerged of American and Indian soldiers singing the song together during a joint exercise at Joint Base Lewis-McChord.

== Lyrics ==
Song video
- Video of Badluram ka Badan by Assam Regiment (official YouTube channel of ADGPI Indian Army)

Romanised Hindustani

Ek khubsurat ladki thi…
Usko dekh ke rifleman…
Chindi khichna bhul gaya…
Havaldar Major dekh liya…
Usko pittu lagaya…
Badluram ek sipahi thaa…
Japan war me mar gaya…
Quartermaster smart thaa…
Usney ration nikala…
Badluram ka badan zamin ke nichey hain…
Toh humein uska ration milta hain…
Sabashh… hallelujah…
Toh humein uska ration milta hain…

Translation (Approximate)

There was a beautiful girl,
Seeing whom the Rifleman
Forgot to pull flannel from gun barrel.
The Havildar Major saw him,
Sends him on a rucksack punishment.
Badluram was a soldier,
Who died in the "Japan" War (WWII).
But our Quartermaster was "smart",
He got us rations.
Since Badluram's body is buried underground,
we receive his rations.
Bravo!… hallelujah…
So we receive his rations.

== See also ==
- Bedu Pako Baro Masa
- Qadam Qadam Badhaye Ja
- Sare Jahan se Accha
