= Sonam Wangchuk (soldier) =

Indian army Colonel; Maha Vir Chakra recipient (1964– )

Colonel Sonam Wangchuk MVC
- Born: 11 May 1964; Sankar, Leh district, Ladakh, India
- Died: 10 April 2026 (aged 61)
- Spouse: Padma Angmo
- Military career
- Allegiance: India
- Branch: Indian Army
- Service years: 1987–2018
- Rank: Colonel
- Service number: IC-45952M
- Units: 4 Assam Regiment; Ladakh Scouts
- Conflicts: Kargil War
- Awards: Maha Vir Chakra

Colonel Sonam Wangchuk, MVC (11 May 1964 – 10 April 2026) was an Indian Army veteran, who served with the Assam Regiment and the Ladakh Scouts. He was awarded the Maha Vir Chakra, India's second highest award for gallantry in the face of the enemy, during his successful operation in the Kargil War. Due to his exemplary feat as a Major during the Kargil War, he is known as the Lion of Ladakh in the Indian Army.

== Early life and education ==
Born on 11 May 1964 in Sankar suburb of Leh, Wangchuk was a native of Khakshal suburb of Leh of the Indian union territory of Ladakh. His mother was the sister of India Politician Thupstan Chhewang and niece of Buddhist monk Kushok Bakula Rinpochhey. In 1969, at the age of about five years, he moved to Solan in Himachal Pradesh, where he studied at St. Luke's School till the fourth standard. Later in 1973, his family moved to Dharamshala where he studied at Sacred Heart High School. Here he had close interactions with the Dalai Lama as his father was serving as the security officer of the 14th Dalai Lama.

In 1975, his father was transferred to Delhi. In Delhi he was educated at The Modern School Barakhamba Road, and took a Bachelor of Arts degree in History, from the Sri Venkateswara College, University of Delhi.

He cited a relative, Colonel Wangdus, as the inspiration for his joining the Indian Army, although his father desired him to become a civil servant.

== Military career ==
Wangchuk attended the Officers Training Academy in Chennai and was commissioned into the 4th battalion of the Assam Regiment as a Second Lieutenant. He was posted to Ukrul in northeast India as a company commander. He then served in Sri Lanka as a part of the Indian Peace Keeping Force. He was later posted to the Indus Wing of the Ladakh Scouts. In 1999, at the outbreak of the Kargil War, then Major Wangchuk led an operation against Pakistani troops in the Chorbat La pass, on 31 May which was the first successful operation of the war, for which he was awarded the Maha Vir Chakra. On 21 August 2017, President Ram Nath Kovind released a documentary named "Lion of Ladakh" about the troops under Wangchuk who repelled enemy forces from Chorbat La.

== Death ==
Wangchuk died from a heart attack on 10 April 2026, at the age of 61.

== Maha Vir Chakra citation ==
Sonam Wangchuk's Maha Vir Chakra citation reads:

Mahavir Chakra (MVC) Awardee: Maj Sonam Wangchuk, MVC

Gazette Notification: 17 Pres/2000,15.8.99 Operation: Vijay - Kargil Date of Award: 1999

Citation:
On 30 May 1999, Major Sonam Wangchuk was leading a column of The Indus Wing, Ladakh Scouts as a part of ongoing operations in Op VIJAY in the Batalik Sector. The column was tasked to occupy Ridge Line on the Line of Control in a glaciated area at a height of about 5,500 metres. This was essential so as to pre-empt its occupation by the enemy and any subsequent infiltration.

While moving towards the Line of Control, the enemy ambushed the column by firing from a vantage position. In the process, one NCO of The Ladakh Scouts was killed. Major Sonam Wangchuk held his column together and in a daring counter ambush, led a raid on the enemy position from a flank, killing two enemy soldiers. The officer also recovered one heavy machine gun and one Universal machine gun, ammunition, controlled stores and three dead bodies of the enemy personnel.

Thereafter, the officer took stock of all forces along the Chorbatla axis in the Batalik Sector and cleared the axis up to the Line of Control of all enemy intrusions at great risk to his life.

Major Sonam Wangchuk displayed exceptional bravery and gallantry of the highest order in the presence of enemy fire and in extreme climatic conditions in the glaciated area.

== Awards and decorations ==

Maha Vir Chakra	Samanya Seva Medal	Special Service Medal	Operation Vijay Star
Siachen Glacier Medal	Operation Vijay	Sainya Seva Medal	High Altitude Service Medal
Videsh Seva Medal	50th Anniversary of Independence Medal	20 Years Long Service Medal	9 Years Long Service Medal
