= Sikkim Scouts =

Regiment of the Indian Army

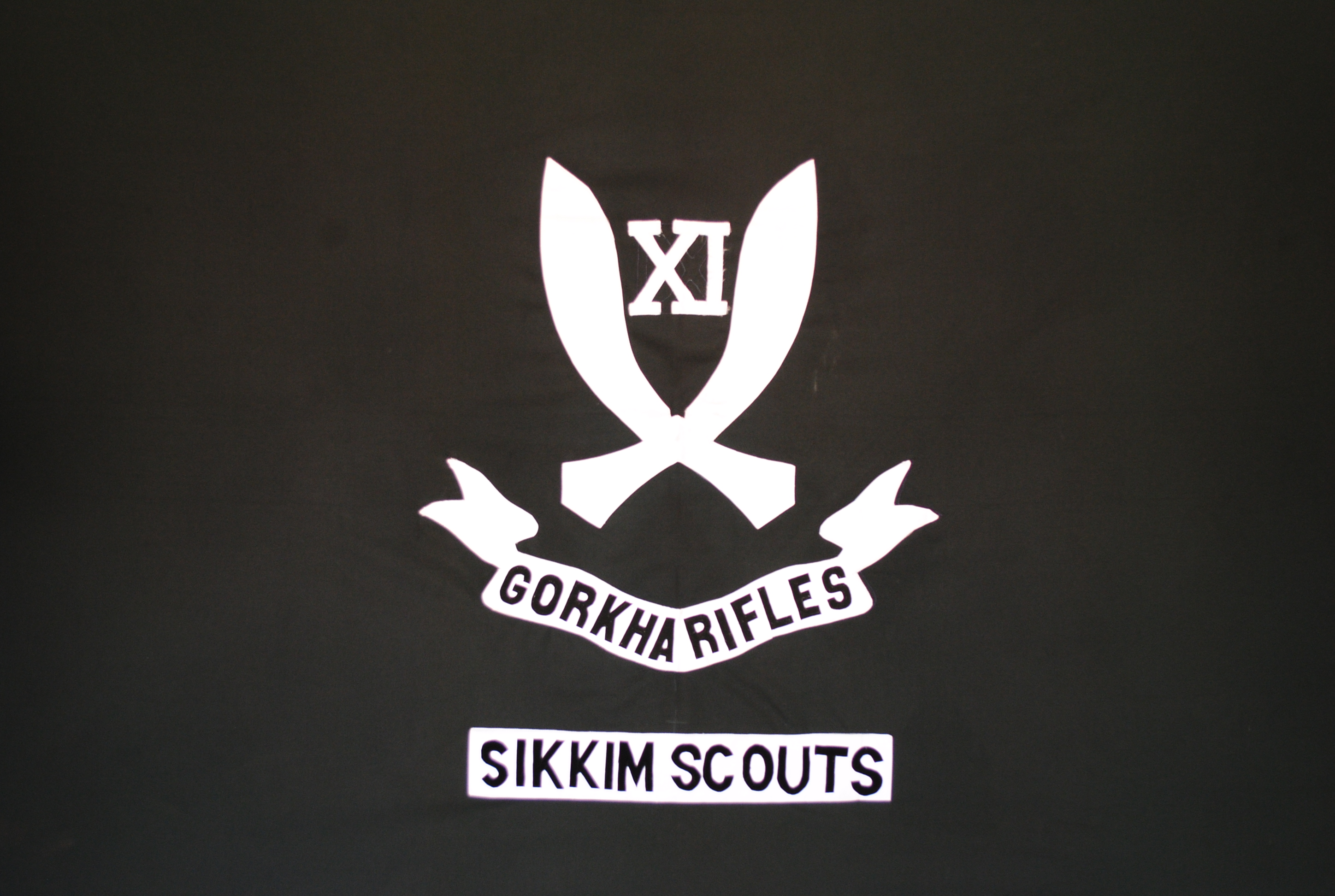
- Sikkim Scouts Regimental insignia and flag
- Active: 2013–present
- Country: India
- Branch: Indian Army
- Type: Infantry
- Role: Mountain warfare
- Size: Two battalions

The Sikkim Scouts is a regiment of the Indian Army based in and recruited from the state of Sikkim. Raised in 2013 and made operational in 2015, it is the newest Indian Army regiment. The regiment was formed along the lines of the Ladakh Scouts and Arunachal Scouts, as it is similarly recruited from a mountainous border area and is dedicated to border defence and mountain warfare. Sikkim Scouts is affiliated with the 11th Gorkha Rifles, and uses its insignia and flag, with the addition of the words ‘Sikkim Scouts’.

== History ==
Sikkim became a state of India in 1975, after having been a British and then Indian protectorate for nearly a century. Even as a protectorate, Indian troops were stationed in Sikkim, because of the area's important role as a buffer zone against China, with which it shares a 222 km (138 miles) border. China did not clearly recognize Sikkim as an Indian state until the 2000s, and continues to lay claim to what India refers to as the northernmost "Finger Area" of Sikkim. The Sino-Indian War of 1962 saw some fighting on the Sikkimese border and from 1965 to 1967, Indian and Chinese forces clashed on the border, notably during the 1967 Chola incident. More recently, there were small incursions and skirmishes around 2008. Several units of the Indian Army and Indo-Tibetan Border Police are stationed in Sikkim as of 2014. Historically, these troops have been drawn from other parts of India, and not from the local population.

Pawan Kumar Chamling, Chief Minister of Sikkim from the Sikkim Democratic Front, requested of the Ministry of Defence that the Sikkim Scouts regiment be formed, to provide positions for young men in Sikkim and since all other Himalayan border states had similar forces. (The Ladakh Scouts were formed in 1963, and the Arunachal Scouts in 2010, while other Himalayan states have dedicated border security battalions in regular regiments such as the Kumaon Regiment.) The ministry and the Indian Army supported Chamling's proposal, as it was in line with India's "sons of soil" policy to bolster her defence units by integrating locals into them, and on 6 December 2012, the proposal was approved by the Cabinet Committee on Security. Officials stated at the time that the regiment would be formally established in mid-2015, after the initial recruits had been raised and trained. The raising of the regiment was expected to cost some Rs 32.5 crore (US$5 million). The cost of maintaining the regiment was projected to be a slightly greater amount per year.

In March 2013, the first recruiting drives for the new regiment were held in Sikkim, which were expected to enrol roughly 500 candidates. Because of the popularity of tattoos among Sikkimese men, many candidates had to be rejected; the Ministry of Defence had issued a policy banning tattoos (other than religious symbols and names) for new recruits to the Indian military in 2011.

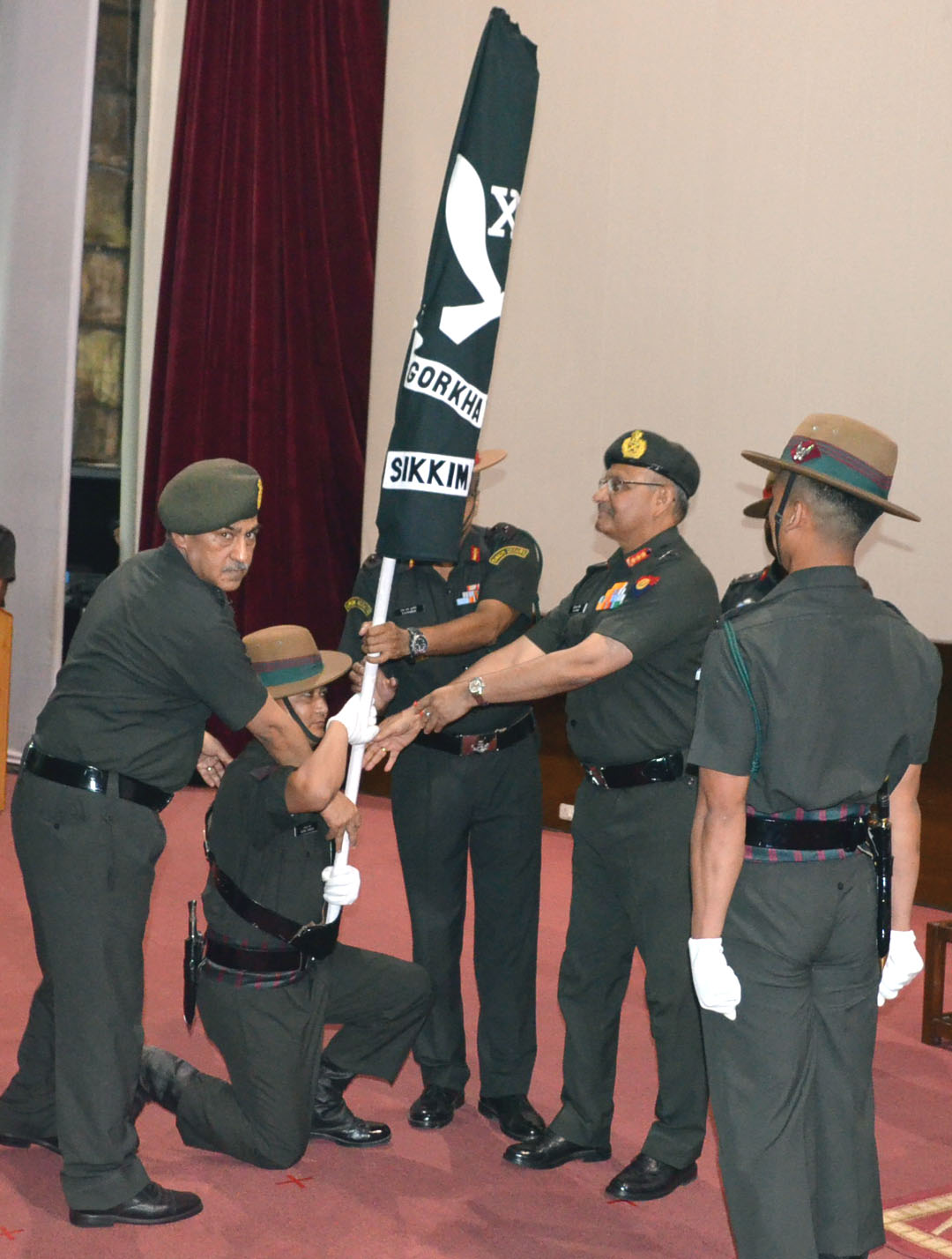
The Army Vice Chief, Lt Gen SK Singh, unveiling the flag of Sikkim Scouts, at Lucknow on May 24, 2013

The regiment was presented with a flag, and formally raised, by Army Vice Chief S. K. Singh at Lucknow on 24 May 2013. At the time, there were 319 Sikkimese recruits in the regiment, and a cadre from Gorkha regiments assembled to train the recruits. The process of recruiting and training the regiment was completed in mid-2015.

== Organisation ==
The regiment was initially planned as one battalion. Its future expansion is limited by the small size of the population from which it recruits. The first battalion's strength planned strength is 934, comprising 28 commissioned officers, 44 junior commissioned officers and 862 jawans (other ranks). A second battalion was being raised as of 2015. The regiment is about 85% Sikkimese, drawing from a population of 612,000 with a large portion of military-age men. The relatives of veterans will be given priority for positions.

The Sikkim Scouts is affiliated with the 11th Gorkha Rifles, and use their insignia and flag, with the addition of the words "Sikkim Scouts".

== Role ==
The soldiers of the Sikkim Scouts are trained in the tactics of mountain warfare. As the members of the regiment are mostly locals, they are expected to be fairly familiar with the skills needed to operate and survive in the mountainous terrain of Sikkim prior to their enlistment. Their training serves to instruct them in modern methods of warfare and instill military discipline. In an additional advantage to the Indian Army, they are able to obtain information from locals more easily, as they belong to the same culture and speak the same language. Indian Army commanders have expressed the sentiment that in the event of war, members of the Sikkim Scouts and other local regiments from the border would be ready to fight to the end for their home state.

The regiment will be tasked with surveilling and guarding the borders of Sikkim, especially the high mountain passes of the north-eastern border with China. While other units of the Indian Army will continue to pass through Sikkim on a temporary (2–3 year) basis, as part of their rotation between different bases in India, the Sikkim Scouts is permanently stationed on the border, and its members will spend nearly their entire career in the state.
