= Bomdila police-Army incident =

Bomdila police-Army incident refers to events which occurred in Bomdila, India on 2 November 2018, when two soldiers from the 2nd Arunachal Scouts Battalion (an Indian Army unit) were arrested and allegedly beaten by the Arunachal Pradesh police. The police alleged that the soldiers were involved in an altercation with civilians and local police, and the army alleged that the soldiers were arrested without cause. After their release, the soldiers were hospitalized at the Tengah Air Base hospital with serious injuries.

The following day, Colonel Firdosh P. Dubash of the 2nd Arunachal Scouts Battalion (2 ASB) informed West Kameng district Superintendent of Police Raja Bhantia that the beating and humiliation of his soldiers had angered his troops. Dubash warned the Arunachal Pradesh Police SSP that he would not tolerate further harassment of his battalion.

The Deputy and Superintendent of Police released an edited video of Dubash warning the police without context. The IAS Association and Indian Police Service (IPS) officers requested the government take action against Dubash. IAS Association president Rakesh Srivastava wrote a letter to Defence Secretary Sanjay Mitra, urging the secretary to take measures against 2 ASB. Srivastava accused the army unit of assault and vandalising public property.

The accusations against the army unit and its commanding officer by the IPS and the IAS association were reported in the India media and caused outrage, alarm, and disappointment in the general public because of the outrageous behavior of the armed forces personnel. The former Chief of Army Staff and Vice Chief of Army Staff, concerned about a possible national-security impact, criticised the accusations and involvement of the IAS and IPS. The army response underscored tensions between the armed forces and the IAS and IPS.

== Involved parties ==
The civilian, police, and military leaders involved in the incident were West Kameng Superintendent of Police Raja Bhantia, who was confirmed in service in December 2017 and posted to Bomdila in June 2018. His deputy and station house officer was Ashok Tayeng, who allegedly arrested and injured the soldiers. Rakesh Srivastava, president of the Indian Civil & Administrative Service (Central) Association, wrote to the defence secretary urging disciplinary measures for the officers and men of the army unit. Sanjay Mitra made the IAS Association letter public, implying that he agreed with Srivastava's letter.

== IAS response ==
Deputy Commissioner Sonal Swaroop, in coordination with Raja Bhantia, provided official briefs and statements to local and national media, the IAS Association in Delhi, and the president of the Indian Civil & Administrative Service (Central) Association. A Central Reserve Police Force contingent was ordered to the police stations, and demonstrations occurred in Bomdila. In Delhi, the IAS response was coordinated and disseminated by the IAS Association on Twitter. A more detailed IAS Association response to the Bomdila incident was contained in the letter from Rakesh Srivastava to Sanjay Mitra, urging Mitra to take "strong and firm action" and discipline the Scouts Battalion. Mitra released the letter to the media, implying that he agreed with the letter's contents.

== IPS response ==
After his meeting with Dubash, Raja Bhantia contacted local and national media and the IPS Association in New Delhi. In statements to the national media, he described the soldiers' injuries in police custody as "simple injuries", and said that police conduct did not constitute a "cognizable offense so far". Bhantia blamed Dubash for the standoff between police and the unit, calling the conduct of 2 ASB's officers and men cognizable, recorded five FIRs for the involved police officers, and obstructed the filing of FIRs by the two soldiers. According to police briefings, statements and reports, 2ASB vandalized government property and threatened the SP and the DC. A 100-soldier escort reportedly fired their guns in the air.

== Armed-forces response ==
The armed forces and its officers (unlike the IAS and IPS) are not permitted to form an association, though retired members are free to form such association. An official defense communique disputed the accusations leveled against the officers and men of the unit, concluding that the incident was an "outcome of highhandedness displayed by the Arunachal police coupled with the lax attitude of the civil administration". According to social media, the pain and humiliation of the 2 ASB soldiers was felt throughout the armed forces and by veterans. The beatings in police custody were seen as "vindictiveness", and the responses by the IPS and IAS associations were viewed as "attempts to both normalise and internalize this illegal action".

Dubash's conduct as commanding officer (rescuing his men from police custody and protesting police brutality) were praised by several senior retired officers. Former Vice Chief of Army Staff Vijay Oberoi commended Dubash for his actions, saying that he "must be supported by the Army hierarchy, as well as the political leadership". According to former Chief of Army Staff Ved Malik, "While I accept that what apparently happened after that was wrong, I would have done the same as what the commanding officer did. The IAS and IPS associations have no business to get involved in this."

About the police response, Oberoi wrote: "The police had not acted in a responsible and mature manner, violating the laid down protocols of dealing with army personnel, ignoring that army personnel must be handed over to the military authorities and not locked up in the police station". Malik said, "I was surprised. Why were the jawans picked up and put behind bars, instead of being handed over to the commanding officer?" Army Chief General Bipin Rawat, responding to questions about the Bomdila incident on 8 November, said that the army was investigating the incident and "if any jawans are found guilty, we will take action against them."

== Government response ==
The government's approach to the fallout from the 2–3 November events was low-key, intending to diffuse the issue without addressing its cause. The incident was called a "clash" by Minister of State Kiren Rijiju of the Ministry of Home Affairs. The Ministry of Defence faulted "police and Indian Army jawans" for the standoff in Bomdila, and is studying "how a brawl at a local level escalated into a major civil-military tussle".

== Timeline ==
2 November
Riflemen Chin Sonam and John Samyor of the 2nd Arunachal Scouts Battalion, on leave in mufti as part of a supervised group attending the Buddha Mahotsava near Bomdila, are struck, arrested and beaten by the Arunachal Pradesh Police for alleged misbehavior despite telling police that they are from the 2nd Arunachal Scouts. Ashok Tayeng, the police officer responsible for the arrests, detention and beatings, was intoxicated at the time. Before incarcerating and beating the soldiers, the police officers did not inform the military police, the soldiers' unit, or the MHA. The district hospital to which the soldiers were brought after their release reported that they had "'multiple contusions and blunt injuries' on their shoulders, thighs and backs". Similar findings were recorded by the military hospital in Tenga, where the soldiers were hospitalized after their release was secured by police. Photographs of the two men in the hospital show them dazed and heavily bandaged.
3 November
Col. Firdosh P. Dubash, commanding officer of the 2nd Arunachal Scouts Battalion, goes to the police station twice to meet with Superintendent of Police Raja Bhantia. During his first (unsuccessful) visit, he encounters a large police presence summoned by Bhantia and Deputy Commissioner Sonal Swaroop: district police, the Arunachal Armed Police Battalion, the Central Reserve Police Force, and the Ministry of Home Affairs' Counter-Insurgency Force. Dubash returns with an armed escort, warning Bhantia not to take such actions again. The police harass Dubash's escort, and he and Bhantia break up a scuffle.
4 November
The 2nd Arunachal Scouts Battalion files an FIR at the Bomdila police station against station house officer Ashok Tayeng, which they were unable to do the previous day. The district administration orders a broad inquiry into the incident. Street protests are organized in Bomdila against the army.
5 November
In an official communique, the army refutes Bhantia and Swaroop's allegations. According to the communique, the soldiers (despite telling police that they are from the Indian Army) were "locked up", "severely beaten", and are "presently admitted and are undergoing medical treatment in Mil hospital". Dubash "tried to defuse the situation by having a meeting with Banthia at the SP Office", but “the police personnel instigated the Commanding Officer’s protection by misbehaving with them and using un-parliamentary language which led to a scuffle between both sides ... "The police have not acted in a responsible manner and have violated all protocols. Instead of taking the soldiers to the police station, they should have handed them over to military authorities ... The entire incident is an outcome of high-handedness of the Arunachal Police, coupled with a lax attitude of the civil administration". BJP national council member R. K. Khrimey urges Defence Minister Nirmala Sitharaman to order "a high-level probe". The IAS Association tweets, "This is unimaginable & strongly condemned. Assault on Police Station, attack on DC & SP by uniformed personnel is unacceptable. Strongly condemned and hope that the guilty are punished without delay."
6 November
Indian Civil and Administrative Services Association president and secretary in the Government of India's Ministry of Women and Child Development Rakesh Srivastava writes to Defence Secretary Sanjay Mitra urging the Ministry of Defence to take action against the Indian Army unit and its officers. Srivastava alleges in the letter that the 2 ASB, led Dubash and Adjutant Major Kaushik Roy, "vandalised government properties and physically assaulted the district magistrate of the area, the superintendent of the police and other officials of the Bomdila police station in the West Kameng district of the state on November 2" and officers of the unit had "verbally abused and stone-pelted" the woman officer (who made a similar allegations). The letter urges the Defence Secretary to take "strong and firm action" against the perpetrators. The IAS Association retweets excerpts of Srivastava's letter with an endorsement: "We strongly condemn the rogue act of ransacking a Police Station, threatening, abusing & assaulting a SHO, Deputy Commissioner, Superintendent of Police on duty. Rule of Law is paramount and Justice must be ensured specially when perpetrators are those whom the Nation looks up to". Defence Secretary Sanjay Mitra releases Srivastava’s letter to the media to coincide with Defence Minister Nirmala Sitharaman's visit to Bomdila. A defence spokesperson tweets, "Incident involving Army Jawan & local police pers at Bomdila has come to light. Accusations being looked into. Meanwhile, issue was discussed today at highest level in State Adm & Army. Any excesses from anyone will not be overlooked".
7 November (Diwali)
Defence Minister Nirmala Sitharaman, Minister of State for Home Kiren Rijiju, Eastern Command commanding officer-in-chief Lt General Manoj Mukund Naravane, and IV Corps General Officer Commanding Lt General Gurpal Singh Sangha arrive in Bomdila and meet with the involved officials. Rijiju tells the Press Trust of India, "The Defence Minister and I looked into the ongoing conflict between the Army and State Police personnel. I appeal everyone not to treat it as Army versus police and civil administration issue".
8 November
The IPS Association tweets a condemnation of Dubash and commends the civil authorities, saying that they "acted with maturity". Former Chief of Army Staff General Ved Prakash Malik says, "The IAS and IPS associations have no business to get involved in this". General Malik, deploring the incident, is surprised that the jawans were "picked up and put behind bars, instead of being handed over to the commanding officer" adding "I would have done the same as what the commanding officer did." Army Chief General Bipin Rawat responds to questions about the Bomdila incident, "We are inquiring into it. If any jawans are found guilty, we will take action against them".
