= Hangpan Dada =

Ashoka Chakra recipient (1979–2016)

Havildar Hangpan Dada AC
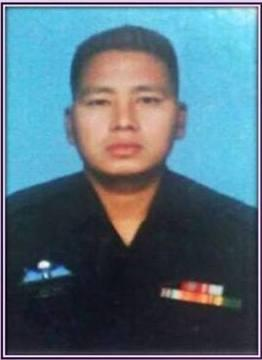
- Born: 2 October 1979; Borduria, Arunachal Pradesh, India
- Died: 26 May 2016 (aged 36); Naugam, Jammu and Kashmir, India
- Military career
- Allegiance: India
- Branch: Indian Army
- Service years: 1997–2016
- Rank: Havildar
- Service number: 13622536N
- Units: 3 Para SF; Assam Regiment
- Awards: Ashok Chakra

Havildar Hangpan Dada, AC (2 October 1979 – 26 May 2016) was a soldier in the Assam Regiment of the Indian Army. He was posthumously awarded the Ashoka Chakra, India's highest peacetime military decoration in August 2016.

== Early life ==
Dada was born in Borduria village, Tirap district, Arunachal Pradesh, India. During his childhood he saved his friend from drowning in a river.

== Military service ==
Dada joined the 3 Para (SF) on 28 October 1997. In 2005, he was transferred to the Assam Regimental Centre, and on 24 January 2008, he joined the 4th battalion, Assam Regiment. He then requested a transfer to 26th Rashtriya Rifles battalion on operations in Kupwara district, Jammu and Kashmir. He was posted to 35 Rashtriya Rifles in May 2016, the unit with which he was serving when he was killed in action.

== Ashok Chakra Action ==
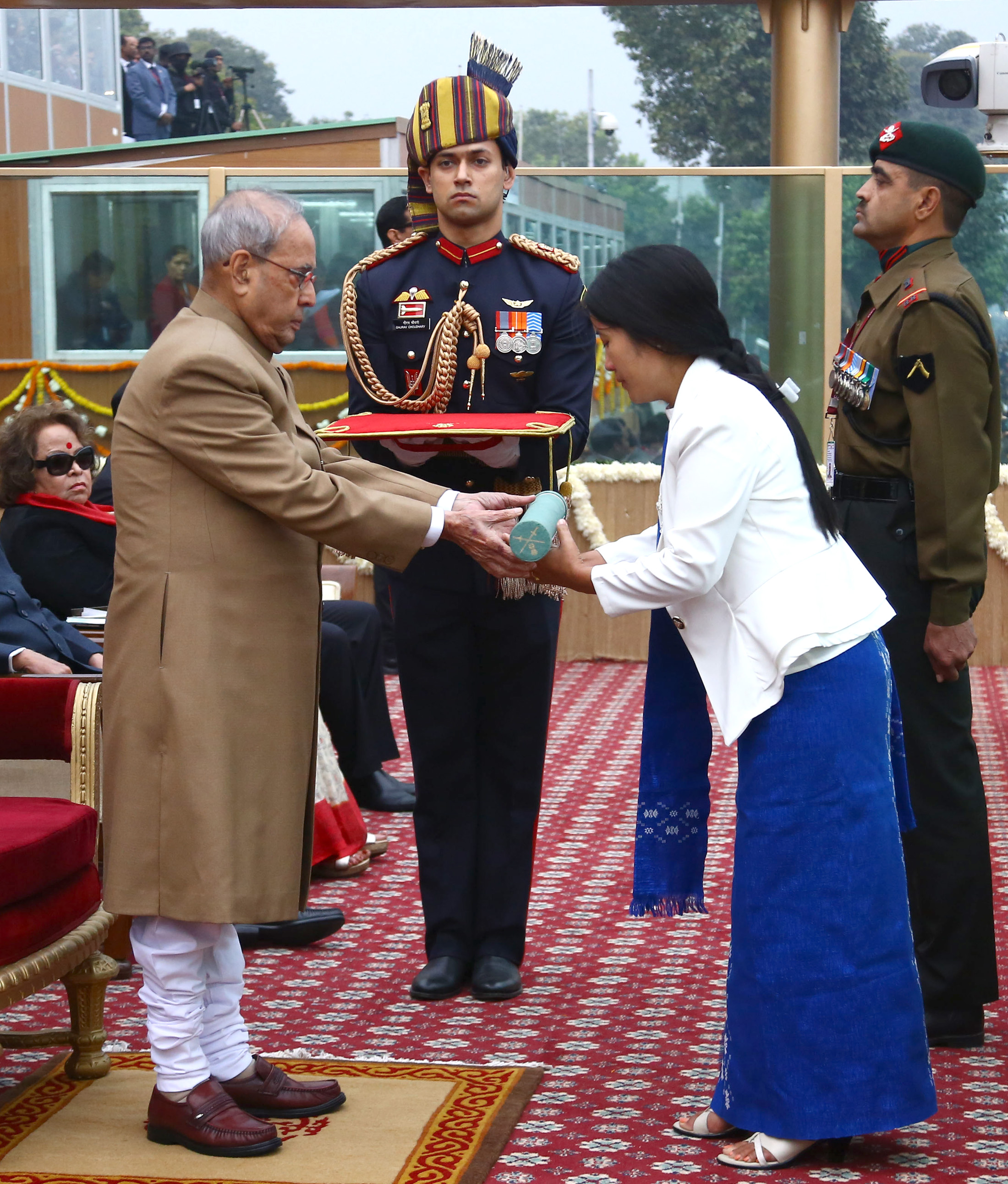
Hangpan Dada's widow receives the Ashok Chakra from president Pranab Mukherjee on 26 January 2017.

On the night of 26 May 2016, Dada, as Sabu Post Commander of 35 Rashtriya Rifles, while establishing a stop along with his section at 12,500 feet, led a charge on hiding terrorists in the Shamshabari Ranges in Naugam, Jammu and Kashmir, resulting in the neutralisation of four heavily armed terrorists. He along with his team spotted the movement of terrorists in the area and engaged them in a fierce encounter that went on for over 24 hours. He charged at the spot where terrorists were and killed two terrorists on the spot and later the third one after a hand-to-hand scuffle as they slid down the hill towards the Line of Control. Dada sustained a sudden burst of automatic fire from the hiding fourth terrorist, receiving a gun shot wound. He continued to pin down the fourth terrorist and later succumbed to his injuries received before wounding the terrorist.

Dada's action of eliminating three terrorists in an engagement at close quarters and injuring a fourth one, in disregard to his personal safety, foiled the infiltration bid and ensured the safety of his men. He was honoured posthumously, with the government announcing the highest gallantry award during peacetime operations, the Ashok Chakra, on the eve of the Republic Day in 2017.

== Personal life ==
Dada was the youngest among the 3 brothers. His eldest brother's name is Laphang Dada and the middle brother is Nokron Dada. He was married to Chasen Lowang Dada on 28 October 2005. They had 2 children: a daughter named Roankhin Dada in 2007 and a son named Senwang Dada in 2010. Dada was known to be a simple church going person who loved to spend time with his family whenever he is home on leave.

== Memorial ==
To remember his service, the Assam Regimental Centre (ARC) named its main office block in its headquarters after Hangpan Dada. The place was inaugurated by Dada's wife. Pema Khandu, the then chief minister of Arunachal Pradesh renamed the annual football and volleyball (men and women) tournaments for Chief Minister's Trophy as Hangpan Dada Memorial Trophy.

A bridge over Subansiri River at Daporijo in Upper Subansiri district has been named after Hangpan Dada. On 20 April 2020, the Chief Minister of Arunachal Pradesh, Pema Khandu, inaugurated the bridge through video conferencing.

On 27 April 2017, a stand in Eden Gardens, Kolkata was named after Havildar Hangpan Dada as a tribute by the people of West Bengal.

== Awards ==

Ashok Chakra	Special Service Medal	High Altitude Service Medal	50th Anniversary of Independence Medal	9 Years Long Service Medal
