= Arunachal Scouts =

Regiment of the Indian Army

- Active: 2010–present
- Country: India
- Allegiance: India
- Branch: Indian Army
- Type: Mountain infantry
- Size: 2 battalions

Commanders
- Colonel of the Regiment: Lt Gen Abhijit S. Pendharkar

The Arunachal Scouts is a mountain infantry regiment of the Indian army based in Arunachal Pradesh. This unit specializes in cold-weather warfare and mountain warfare, counterinsurgency, jungle warfare, long-range penetration, manoeuvre warfare, raiding with small unit tactics, and reconnaissance in difficult to reach and dangerous terrain. The regiment was established with the purpose of counterinsurgency and defending the Indian-Chinese border in Arunachal Pradesh. A large proportion of the Arunachal Scouts are local to the region in which they work. Arunachal Scouts is affiliated with the Assam Regiment, from where it receives its training, mentoring, and regimental support, and uses its insignia and flag, with the addition of the words ‘Arunachal Scouts’. It consists of two battalions, the first raised in 2010 and the second in 2013.

== History ==
=== Context ===
Tensions between India and China at the Tibetan border particularly with relation to Arunachal Pradesh have historically been high, with China's 1962 invasion of India bringing this issue to light. Decades after the Sino-Indian War, the 4,057 kilometre boundary separating the two countries remains disputed leaving Himalayan control lines ambiguous. China's continued interest in staking a claim in India's northeast has led to China's practice of referring to the Arunachal Pradesh region as 'Southern Tibet' paired with an increased Chinese militant presence at the border led to the formation and mobilisation of the Arunachal Scouts, as a means of reinforcements for the Ladakh and Sikkim Scouts. Having already witnessed the victory of China's People's Liberation Army (PLA) against Indian soldiers in 1962 in Arunachal Pradesh, reporters theorised the defeat of the Indian army to be due to factors such as diminished roads and communication capabilities as well as a lack of high-level ammunition and arms. These factors, as well as a smaller number of armed forces present at the border, limited understanding of regional topography and acclimatisation issues, among others, have also been theorised to be responsible for India's loss as well as providing rationale for the mobilisation of local scouts.

On 13 October 2020, the Chairman of the Central Military Commission, Xi Jinping told the People's Liberation Army (PLA) of China to prepare themselves for further conflict with India, asking the soldiers to "put all minds and energy on preparing for war." Currently, India sustains a growing and significant number of soldiers near the border with China, including the Arunachal Scouts of Arunachal Pradesh. Furthermore, India is developing roads in the region in conjunction to stationing the two battalions of Arunachal Scouts, two mountain brigades and an artillery division to ensure the Indian army is prepared. A violent exchange in June of 2020, following the construction of an Indian road in Ladakh resulted in the death of 20 members of the Indian Army, the first clash in an India-China border region in over forty years. The Sela tunnel, which is currently under construction and due to reach completion by February in 2022 will enable connectivity between the Dirang and Tawang regions in all weather conditions, enhancing the ability of the Indian army to defend against the threat China imposes on the region.

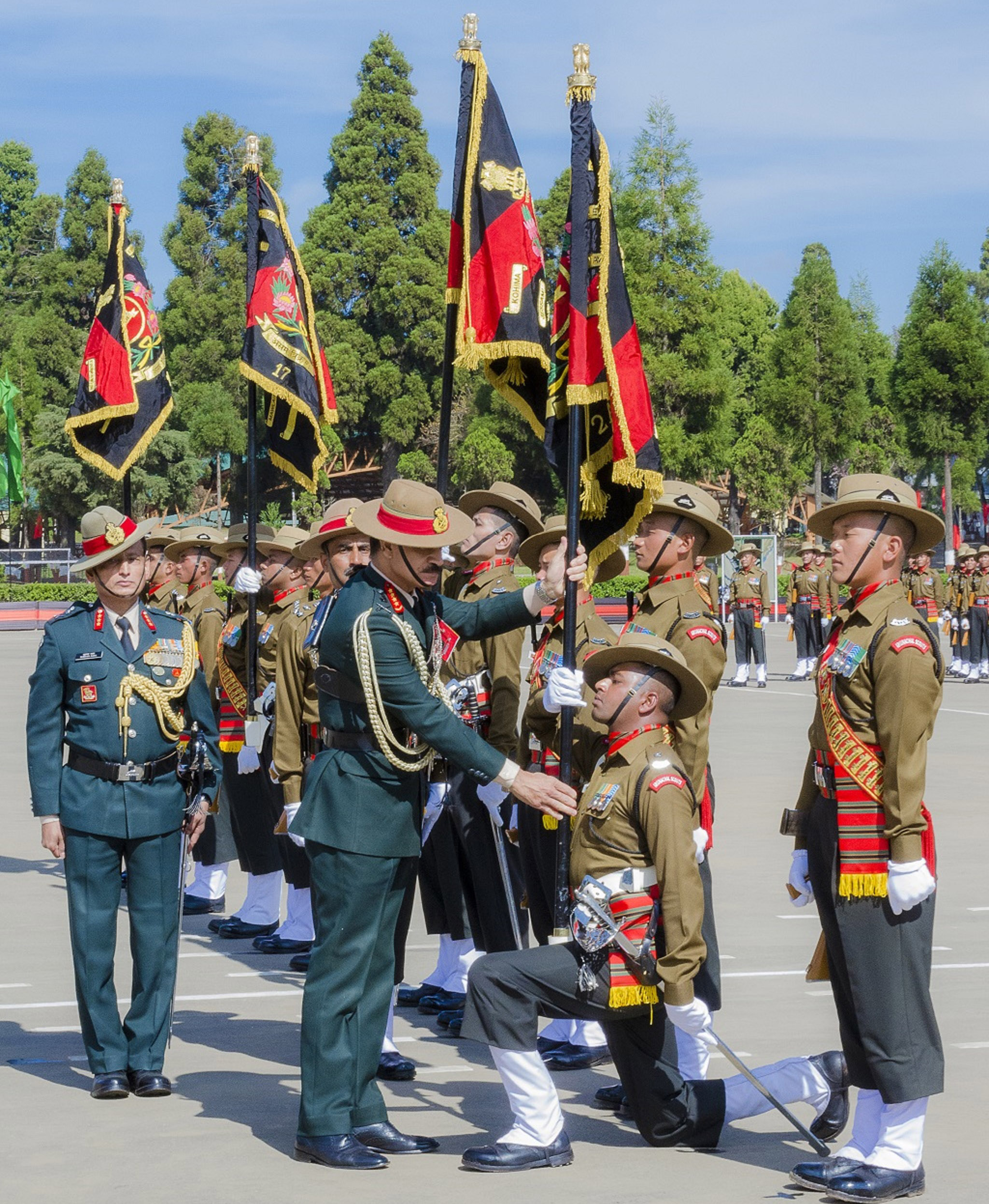
The Chief of Army Staff, General Dalbir Singh presenting the colours to 1 & 2 Arunachal Scouts (along with two battalions of the Assam Regiment), at the Assam Regimental Centre, Shillong, Meghalaya on November 16, 2016.

=== Reasoning for regiment formation ===
The formation of the Arunachal Scouts as an Indian reaction to an increased Chinese border presence was done in conjunction to the mobilisation of air, artillery and surveillance resources with the intention of strengthening the country's defense lines in the region. The further addition of the Arunachal Scouts as a localised force reminiscent of that of the Sikkim and Ladakh scouts, was perceived by the Government of India to be a cost-effective approach to the policing of the front line with personnel who have a developed understanding of the locale and are accustomed to the high altitude, climate and terrain of the region. Largely, the Arunachal Scouts are used as a means to enrich and further bolster the defensive work of special forces in the area. This partnership, however, also serves to assist the development of the military skills of the scouts. Modelled after the local guerrilla forces reinforcing the defence of the North-western Indian front line, the advantages experienced through the success of the formation of such forces informed the formation and mobilisation of a similar taskforce in Arunachal Pradesh. This use of local militants gives India the advantage of the ensured and maintained allegiance of the economically subjugated border communities, as well as the development of relatively mobile militant contingents with a vested interest in the defense of the region's tribal populations and a more developed understanding of the locale in which their trained tactics are utilised. Furthermore, the scout's familial links to the local community better equips them to recognise signs of Chinese infiltration across the border into Arunachal Pradesh as well as to engage with the community using their local language, as in the region there are over twenty-six major tribes.

=== Formation and mobilisation ===
November 2006 saw local concern surrounding the growth in presence of the Chinese militia cause local Arunachal Pradesh politicians to ask Indian Parliament for a stronger Indian Military presence surrounding the Tibetan border. The appeal of the locals, paired with Governor JJ Singh's suggestion in 2008 regarding the mobilisation of Arunachal Scouts intended to reinforce the lines of the military forces already present in the region lead to the advancement of this issue to India's Prime Minister at the time, Dr. Manmohan Singh. The Indian Union Cabinet addressed the matter in 2009, leading to the raising of the first battalion of Arunachal Scouts in 2010. The first battalion of the Arunachal scouts were raised out of the pre-existing ranks of the Assam Regiment of the Indian Army. Therefore, although working as part of the Assam Regiment, the regiment personnel administering the defense of Arunachal Pradesh are from the region working as Arunachal Scouts. The first battalion of Arunachal Scouts were posted in Rayang, in the regions Northeast with Rayang acting as the battalion's headquarters, 30 kilometres away from the headquarters in the East Siang region. In addition to acting as a means of fortifying frontier defence on the Tibetan border, the formation and mobilisation of the Arunachal Scouts was also used and viewed as a means of combating the high rates of unemployment experienced by youth in the Arunachal Pradesh region.

Media reactions to the formation and mobilisation of Arunachal Scouts were rather positive, particularly when keeping the 1962 Chinese invasion of India as well as the more recent death of 20 soldiers in June 2020. The general attitude towards the scouts acknowledges their familiarity with the region's climate, land topography and more effective navigational routes and sites these special attributes to be a positive move in the direction of a strong military presence on the border with China.

== Roles and training ==
Under the pretence that it would assist in their future posting in the state, during their training the Arunachal Scouts were advised to familiarise themselves with the topography of varying landscapes of the region. The soldiers of the Arunachal Scout battalions specialise in mountain warfare tactics. Largely local to the region, when enlisting, Arunachal Scout soldiers are expected to have a deeper understanding of the requisite survival and operational skills that characterise mountain warfare in the North-eastern region.

Similar to the role of the Ladakh Scouts in the country's Northwest, the Arunachal Scouts play a largely strategic intelligence and guerrilla tactic role along the front line. Additionally, the scouts have the ability to gain intelligence from locals due to the advantage of trust within the community due to their being local and their ability to speak and understand the resident language.

== Battalions ==
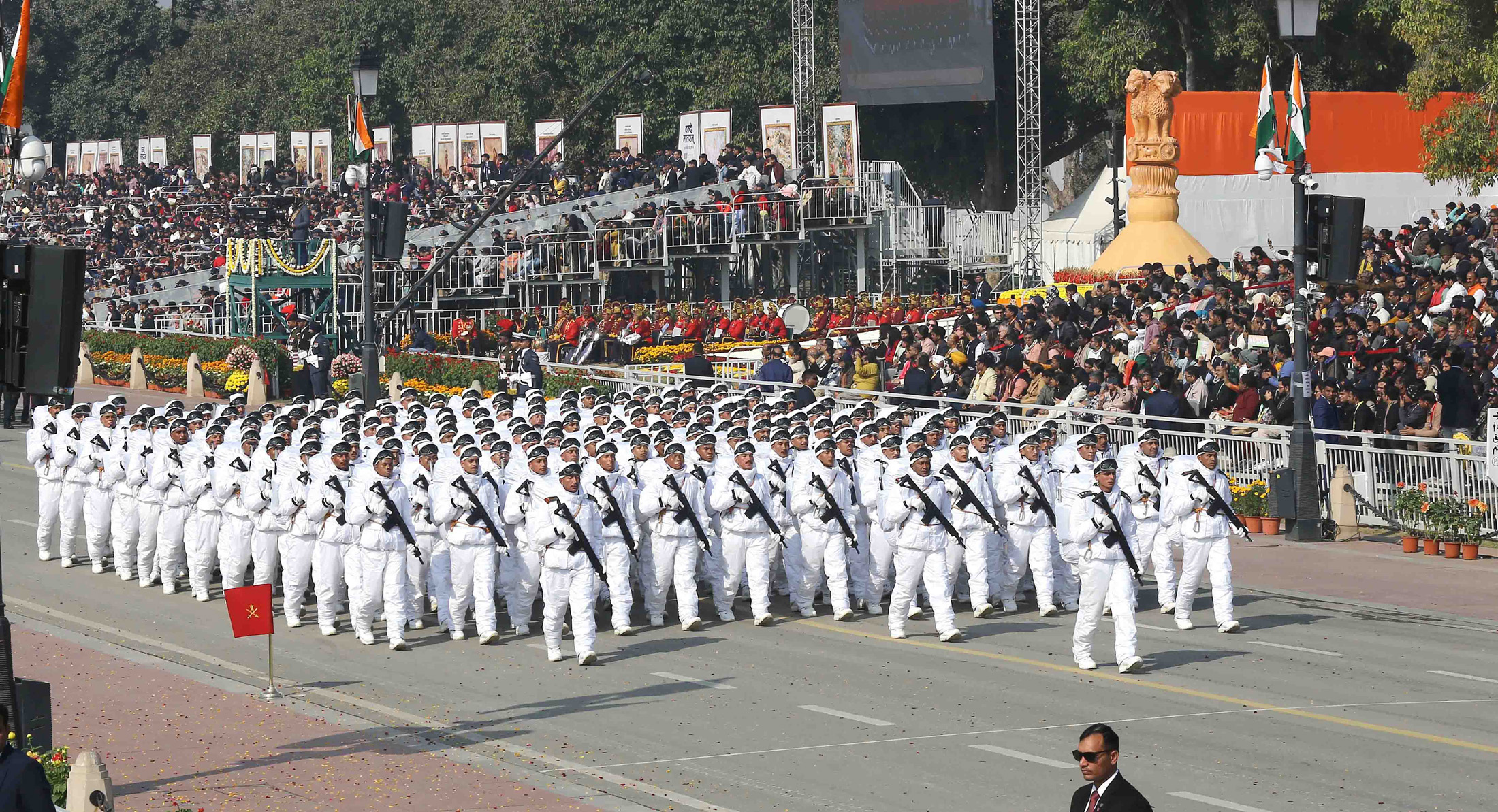
Contingent of mixed scouts (including Arunachal Scouts) during the 76th Republic Day Parade in 2026

Battalion	Raising Date	Remarks	References
1st Battalion	10 November 2010	Raised at Shillong under Colonel Anuj Jain	
2nd Battalion	1 June 2013	Raised at Umroi Cantonment in Meghalaya under Colonel Neelesh Anand Pagulwar	

Both the units were awarded the Governor of Arunachal Pradesh's citation - the second battalion on 28 March 2022 and the first battalion on 26 September 2022.

== Affiliation ==
106 Air Force Squadron - The Assam Regiment and Arunachal Scouts of Indian Army were affiliated with the 106 Air Force Squadron at Tezpur on 15 February 2021.

== Beyond border defence ==
Following the crash of an AN-32 aircraft belonging to the Indian Air Force in Arunachal Pradesh on 3 June in 2019, the Arunachal Scouts, along with the Indian army were recruited to mobilise towards the accident site. Their role was largely to provide aid and assistance at ground zero, as well as ascertain the condition the occupants of the aircraft were in. The aircraft was reportedly spotted 16 kilometres of Lipo at an estimated elevation of 12,000 feet. There have also been instances whereby the Arunachal Scouts have been involved in the distribution of resources amongst local communities. An instance occurred on 12 May 2020 whereby a scout and their family members distributed 10 kilograms of rice and 1 kilogram of salt each to approximately 112 people from a village in the Longding region of Arunachal Pradesh, financed by the scout member himself. The scout member also paid the costs involved in the transportation and procurement of the resources for the village.

== Bomdila incident ==
The events of the Bomdila police-Army incident have resulted in heightened tensions between the second battalion of Arunachal Scouts and local Arunachal Pradesh police officers in Bomdila. Local police allege the altercation was sparked when scouts involved themselves in an altercation with the police forces and civilians and thus, were arrested during the Buddha Mahotsava celebration. However, the army alleges that the scouts were arrested without reason, and were assaulted by the Arunachal Pradesh police, sustaining serious injuries that lead to their hospitalisation upon their release from police custody. Following on from the physical altercation between local police and the scouts, scout personnel reportedly showed up in hundreds and were reported to have vandalised the local police station and their office on the second day of the Buddha Mahotsava celebrations. The police allege members of the second regiment of Arunachal Scouts vandalised approximately five police vehicles, broke windows and doors and took weapons the local police stored in their station.

Following the incident, community organisations from West Kameng held an emergency meeting, leading them to condemn the behaviour of the scouts. The Local organisations of West Kameng perceived the actions of the 2nd battalion of Arunachal scouts to be indicative of a lack of regard for the local police and administration, expressing their solidarity with the district administration and police.

The All Arunachal Pradesh Students' Union (AAPSU) also denounced the actions of the scouts, pushing for an inquiry into the incident as well as just punishment of the perpetrators. Viewing their behaviour to be reflective of a disciplinary lapse, the AAPSU went further to express the fearful feelings members of the public had towards the scouts following the incident.

In Itanagar on 6 November, various Women's associations of the West Kameng region of Arunachal Pradesh initiated a protest against the second battalion of Arunachal Scouts in Bomdila's Buddha Park, labelling their actions in Bomdila as "unruly rogue behaviour". The protestors believed the actions of the scouts to be evidence of a "disregard for the policewomen on duty" as well as an absence of attitudes they believed to be conducive to the operation of a disciplined armed force. Seeking action to rectify their perceived issues within the scouts, many protestors also took part to express their perception of being unsafe in the presence of the Arunachal Scouts.

For almost a week, local media remained quiet on the altercation in Bomdila, Arunachal Pradesh. Some local news reporters fear that the events that occurred between the army and the police in Arunachal Pradesh are indicative of larger issues of animosity, suspicion and resentment between the two forces. Public support for the scouts as opposed to the police force has also been reported to cause stress for the IPS association and the Indian Civil and Administrative Services (ICS/AS). Local news outlets report support from portions of the public despite actions of the scouts and have rather been acclaimed to be acts of bravery.

== See also ==
- List of regiments of the Indian Army
- Ladakh Scouts
