= Borduria, Tirap district =

Coordinates: 27°02′N 95°29′E

Borduria, Tirap district, Arunachal Pradesh. Location in India.

Borduria is a village near Khonsa in Tirap district of Arunachal Pradesh, India. Its chief tribe is the Lowangs. The current head is Wanglin Lowangdong . The people of the region are known for their self-dependence and most activities are overseen by the members of the ruling tribe.
