= Ladakh Scouts =

Infantry regiment of the Indian Army

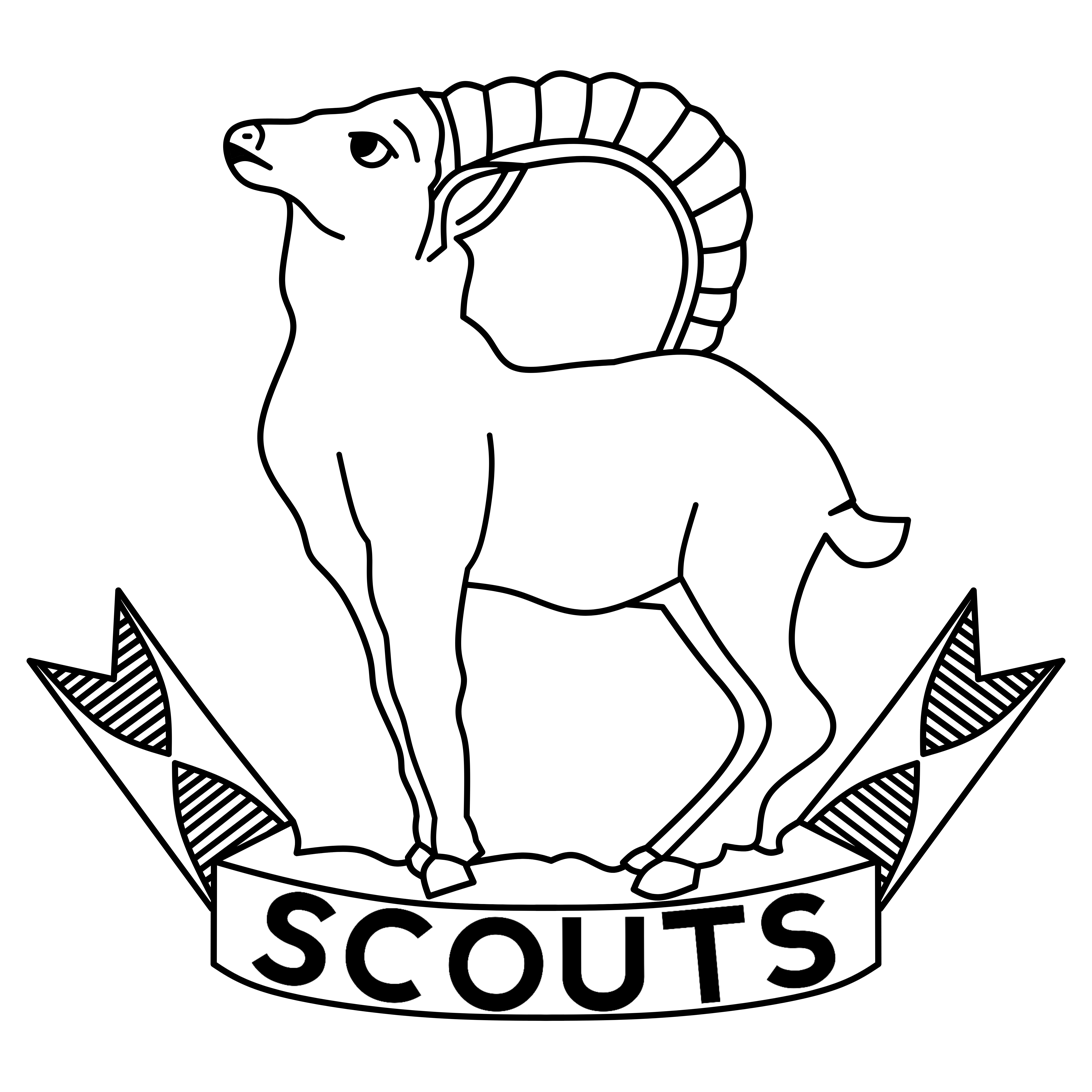
- Regimental insignia of the Ladakh Scouts
- Active: 1963–present
- Country: India
- Allegiance: India
- Branch: Indian Army
- Type: Mountain infantry
- Role: Anti-tank warfare Artillery observer Bomb disposal Close-quarters battle Cold-weather warfare Counterinsurgency; HUMINT; Internal security Long-range penetration Maneuver warfare Mountain warfare Raiding; Reconnaissance; Tracking; Urban warfare
- Size: 5 battalions
- Regimental Centre: Phyang, Leh, Ladakh
- Nicknames: Snow Warriors, Snow Leopards
- War Cry: Ki Ki So So Lhargyalo (Victory to God).
- Decorations: 1 Unit citation, 1 Ashok Chakra, 2 Mahavir Chakra, 2 Kirti Chakra, 2 Ati Vishisht Seva Medals, 26 Vir Chakra, 6 Shaurya Chakra, 3 Yudh Seva Medals, 64 Sena Medals, 13 Vishisht Seva Medals, 13 Mentions-in-Dispatches, 67 Chief of Army Staff commendation cards, 2 Jeevan Raksha Padak

Commanders
- Current commander: Lieutenant General MP Singh

Insignia
- Insignia: Himalayan Ibex

The Ladakh Scouts is a mountain infantry regiment of the Indian Army, nicknamed as the "Snow Warriors" or "Snow Leopards". The regiment specializes in cold-weather warfare and mountain warfare, long-range penetration, maneuver warfare, raiding with small unit tactics, and reconnaissance in difficult to reach and dangerous terrain. Its primary role is to guard India's borders in the high altitudes of the Union Territory of Ladakh.

The Ladakh Scouts were formed in 1963 by spinning off the Ladakhi battalions of the Jammu and Kashmir Militia. They were converted into an Army regiment in 2000. The Ladakh Scouts recruits mainly from India's Ladakhi and Tibetan ethnic communities, and is among the army's most decorated units. Its soldiers have been honoured with over 300 gallantry awards and citations including a Unit citation, one Ashok Chakra, ten Maha Vir Chakras and two Kirti Chakras.

== History ==
In 1948, the "Nubra Guards" were raised from local Ladakhi warriors to patrol India's mountainous border in the Ladakh region. In 1952, the Nubra Guards were merged as the 7th Battalion, Jammu & Kashmir Militia (which itself later became the Jammu and Kashmir Light Infantry). The 14th Battalion of the militia was also raised from Ladakh in 1959.

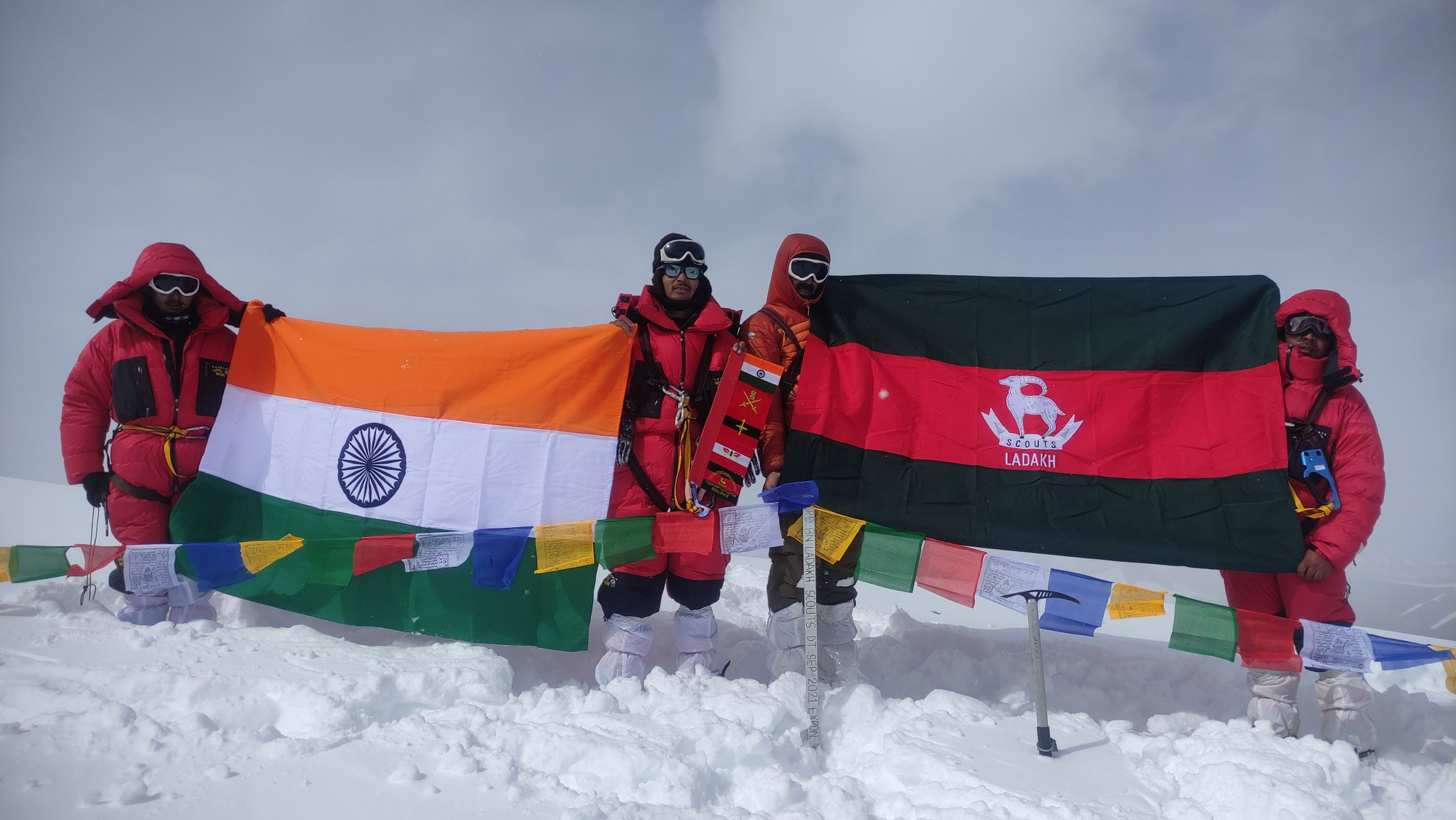
Mountaineering Expedition of Zedang Sumpa Battalion of Ladakh Scouts, which scaled five virgin peaks above 6000 metres located in the Central Rimo Glacier, October 2021.

On 1 June 1963, following the Sino-Indian War of 1962, Col. S.P Salunke formed the Ladakh Scouts by spinning off the 7th and 14th Battalions of the J&K Militia, and the unit was given the role of reconnaissance and interdiction in the high-altitude border regions by the Government of India.

After the Kargil War, the Ladakh Scouts was reformed as a standard infantry regiment on 1 June 2000. Its parent regiment is the Jammu & Kashmir Rifles, but it trains and fights as an independent unit for all intents and purposes.

On 2 June 2013, it celebrated its Golden Jubilee to mark the merger between the Nubra Guards and the 7th Battalion of the J&K light infantry.

== Units ==
The regiment currently consists of 5 battalions, with support personnel affiliated to other arms of the Indian army seconded in on rotation.

== Recent Engagements ==
=== Indo-Pakistani Wars of 1965 and 1971 ===
Units of the regiment have been deployed in combat in every major Indian operation since the Indo-Pakistan War of 1965. The Scouts also received battle honours in the undeclared western theatre of the Indo-Pakistan War of 1971 which led to the independence of East Pakistan.

=== Operation Meghdoot ===
Troops of the Ladakh Scouts, 4 Kumaon and 19 Kumaon Regiments were deployed to capture the Siachen Glacier in April 1984, as a part of Operation Meghdoot. In these Operations, one Company of Ladakh Scouts and one Coy of 4 Kumaon were launched to secure Siala and Bilafondla by heliborne Ops and 19 Kumaon less two coys had secured the ridgeline of Gyongla Glacier (Central Glacier Region) in and one coy of 19 Kumaon secured heights of Urdlup Glacier (Southern Glacier region).

=== Kargil War ===
The Ladakh Scouts were one of the first units to be deployed in combat action for Operation Vijay. Its units displayed exemplary gallantry and won numerous awards, including a Maha Vir Chakra for Major Sonam Wangchuk. The Scouts were awarded a Unit Citation for their gallantry during the battles of Point 5000 on 5–6 July 1999, Dog Hill on the night 30 June – 1 July, and Padma Go on 9–10 July 1999, in the Batalik Sector. The citation recognised the unit's performance with distinction during Operation Vijay and display of exemplary valour and grit in the face of the enemy.

== Distinctions ==
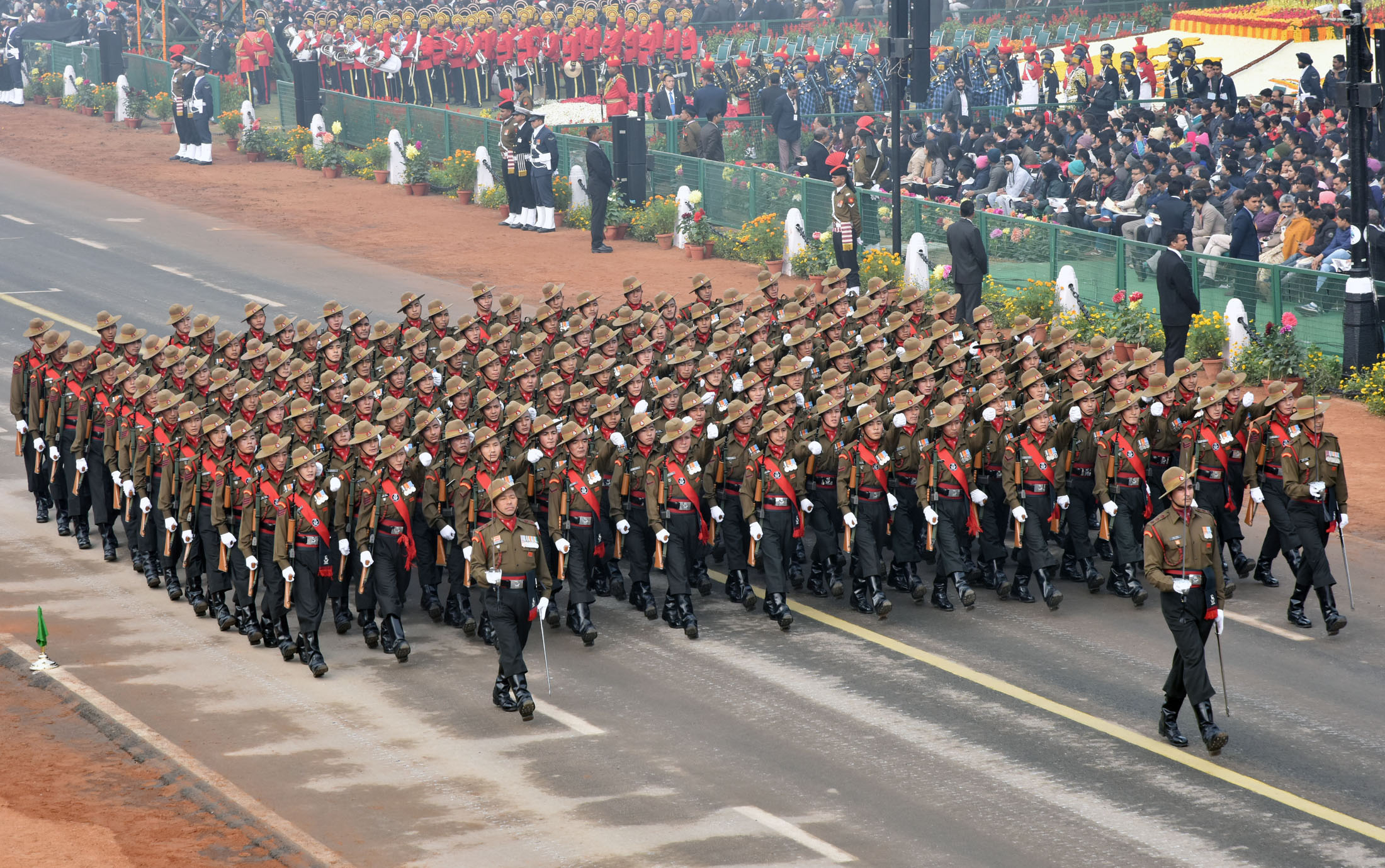
The Ladakh Scouts Marching Contingent passes through the Rajpath, on the occasion of the 69th Republic Day Parade 2018

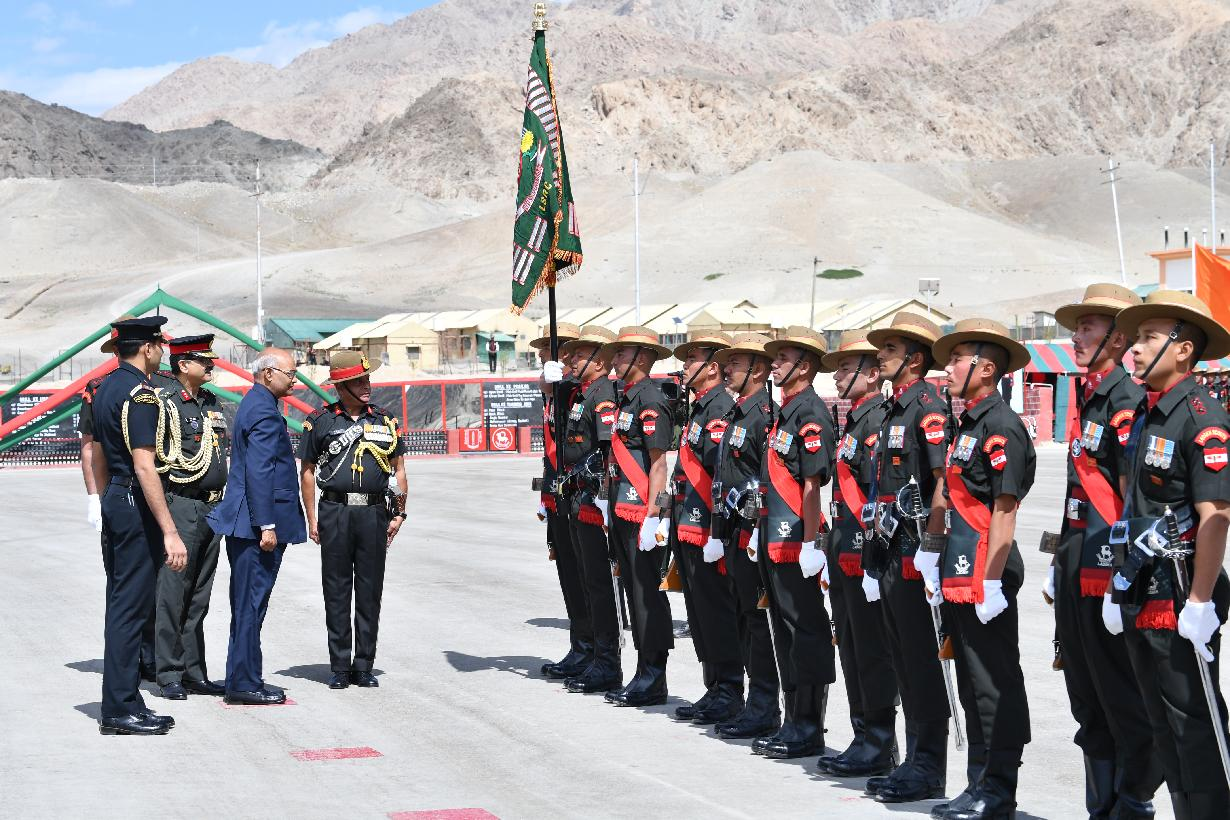
The President of India, Shri Ram Nath Kovind presenting the President's Colours to all five Ladakh Scouts Battalions at Ladakh Scouts Regimental Centre, Leh, in Jammu & Kashmir on 21 August 2017

=== Battle honours ===
- Turtuk, Indo-Pakistan War of 1971

=== Gallantry awards ===
Ashoka Chakra recipient:

- Naib Subedar Chhering Mutup

Maha Vir Chakra recipients:

- Colonel Sonam Wangchuk
- Colonel Chewang Rinchen (with Bar)

Among the awards conferred on the soldiers of the Ladakh Scouts are:

- 1 Unit citation
- 1 Ashok Chakra
- 2 Maha Vir Chakras
- 2 Kirti Chakras
- 26 Vir Chakras
- 6 Shaurya Chakras
- 3 Yudh Seva Medals
- 2 Ati Vishisht Seva Medals
- 13 Vishisht Seva Medals
- 64 Sena Medals
- 13 Mentions-in-Dispatches
- 67 Chief of Army Staff commendation cards
- 2 Jeevan Raksha Padaks

=== Presidential Colours ===
The high honour of the presentation of presidential colours was given to the regiment on 21 August 2017 by the President of India, who is the constitutional commander-in-chief of the Indian Armed Forces.

== See also ==
- List of regiments of the Indian Army
- Arunachal Scouts
- Gilgit-Baltistan Scouts
- Northern Light Infantry Regiment
