= INS Jalashwa =

Amphibious transport dock of the Indian Navy

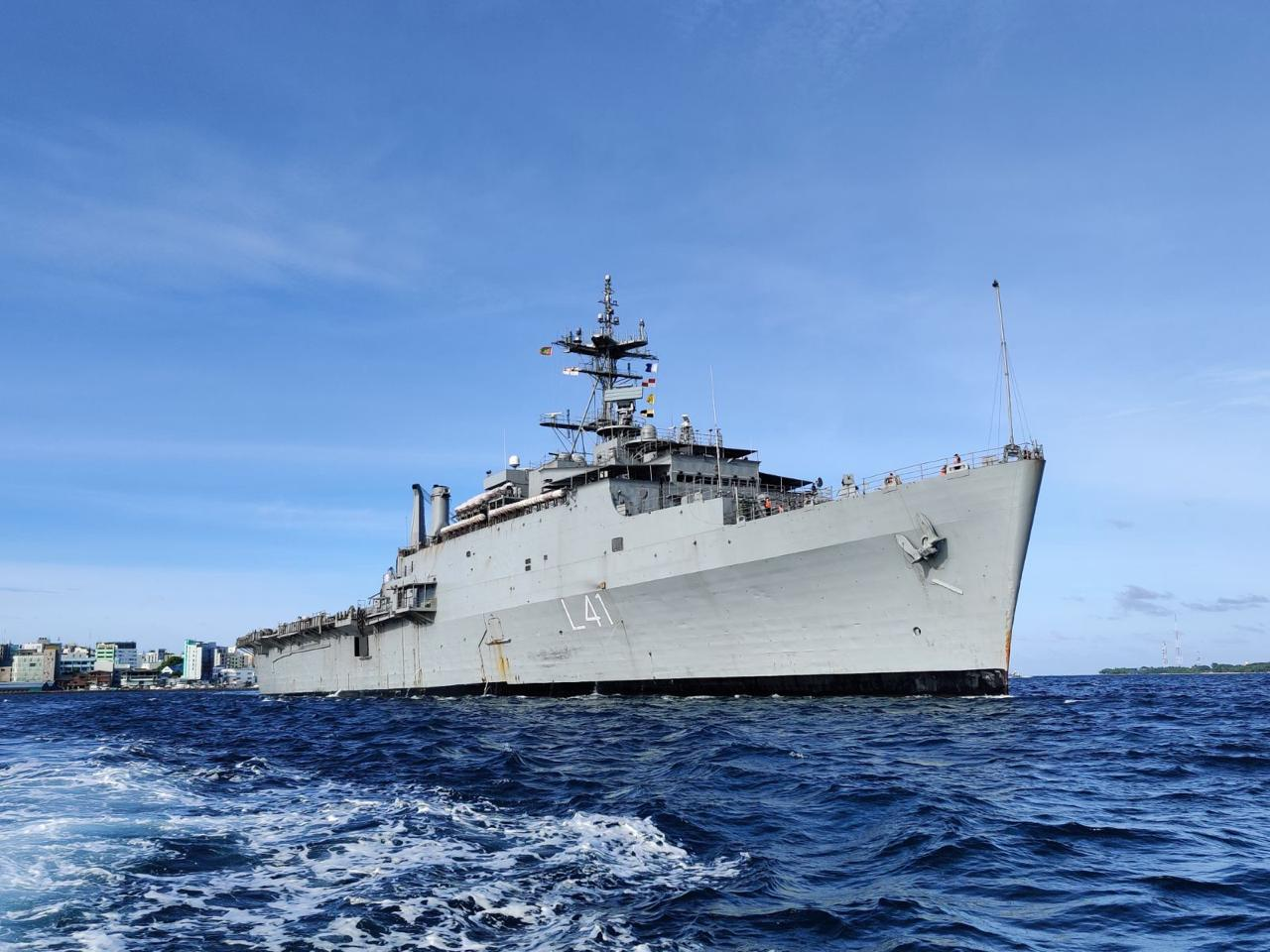
- Operation Samudra Setu -INS Jalashwa Departs Malé

History

India
- Name: INS Jalashwa
- Namesake: Sanskrit for Hippopotamus
- Laid down: 8 August 1966 (as USS Trenton)
- Launched: 3 August 1968 (as USS Trenton)
- Acquired: 17 January 2007
- Commissioned: 22 June 2007
- Identification: Pennant number: L41; MMSI number: 419100074; Callsign: AUQL
- Motto: "The fearless pioneers"
- Status: Active

General characteristics
- Class & type: Austin-class amphibious transport dock
- Displacement: Light: 8,900 tonnes; Standard: 12,000 tonnes; Full load: 16,600 tonnes
- Length: 173.7 metres (570 feet) overall, 167 metres (548 feet) waterline
- Beam: 30.4 metres (100 feet) extreme, 25.6 metres (84 feet) waterline
- Draught: 6.7 metres (22 feet) maximum, 7 metres (23 feet) limit
- Propulsion: Two boilers, two steam turbines, two shafts; 24,000 shaft horsepower (18,000 kW)
- Speed: 20 knots (40 km/h)
- Boats & landing craft carried: 1 × LCAC, or; 1 × LCU, or; 4 × LCM-8, or; 9 × LCM-6, or; 24 × AAV
- Complement: 27 officers, 380 sailors; Landing force: up to 1,000 troops
- Sensors & processing systems: BEL Revathi 3-D E/F-band radar
- Electronic warfare & decoys: Kavach decoy launcher
- Armament: 4 × 3 in / 50 calibre AA gun mounts; AK-630M close-in weapon system
- Aircraft carried: 6 × UH-3 Sea King helicopters

INS Jalashwa (lit. 'Horse of the Sea') is an amphibious transport dock currently in service with the Indian Navy. Formerly USS Trenton, she, along with six Sikorsky SH-3 Sea King helicopters were procured from the United States by India for a total of US$90 million in 2005. She was commissioned on 22 June 2007. INS Jalashwa is the only Indian naval ship to be acquired from the United States. She is based in Visakhapatnam under the Eastern Naval Command.

== Description ==
Jalashwa features a well deck, which can house up to four LCM-8 mechanised landing craft that can be launched by flooding the well deck and lowering the hinged gate aft of the ship. She also has a flight deck for helicopter operations from which up to six medium helicopters can operate simultaneously. The deck can also be used to operate vertical take-off and landing (VTOL) aircraft like the Sea Harrier, in special circumstances. She is also capable of embarking over 1,000 troops, and is fully equipped with extensive medical facilities including four operation theatres, a 12-bed ward, a laboratory and a dental centre.

== Acquisition history ==
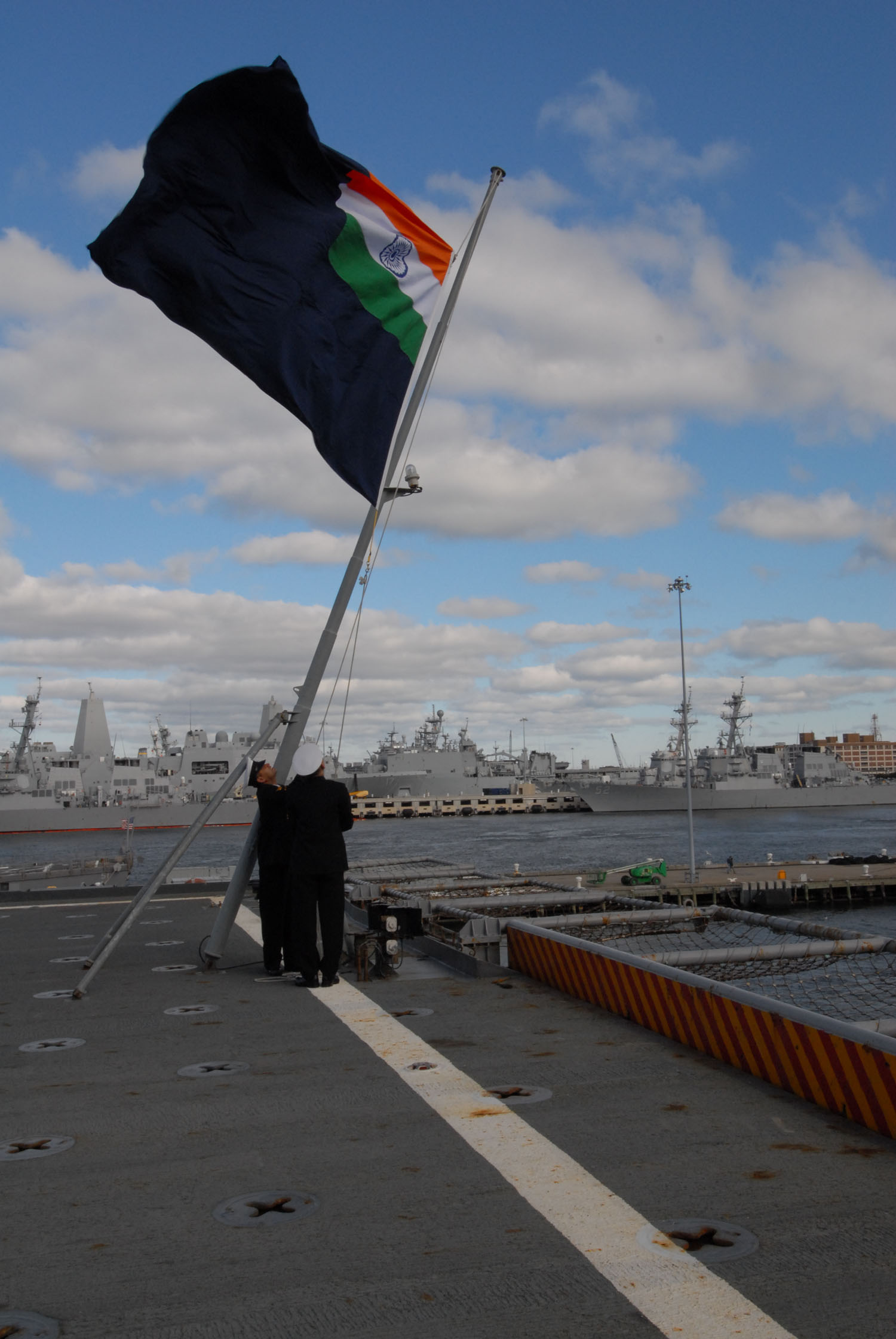
Indian Navy jack is raised on INS Jalashwa during her commissioning.

The Indian Navy felt the need for better amphibious landing capability in the aftermath of the 2004 Indian Ocean tsunami, when the Navy's rescue and humanitarian efforts were hampered by inadequacy of existing amphibious ships in its fleet. In 2006, the Indian government announced it would purchase the US Navy's retired Austin-class landing platform dock USS Trenton for approximately ₹228 crore ($48.44 million). Her sister ship USS Nashville was also offered, but India declined the offer.

The Indian Navy took possession of the ship on 17 January 2007 in Norfolk, Virginia after the transfer agreement was signed by Commodore P Murugesan, Naval Attaché at the Embassy of India to the US, and Rear Admiral Garry E Hall of US Navy. She then underwent a refit at the Norfolk Naval Base until May 2007. The Indian Navy also purchased six UH-3 Sea King maritime utility transport helicopters for $39 million for operation from the ship. Indian Naval Sea Harriers could also be operated from the deck of the ship until their retirement in 2016. The Westland sea kings and the UH-3 Sea Kings were operated from the ship by INAS 350.

The ship was commissioned as INS Jalashwa on 22 June 2007, at Norfolk by Shri Ronan Sen, then the Indian ambassador to the United States. Captain BS Ahluwalia and Commander Dinesh Singh were her first Commanding Officer and Executive Officer, respectively.

=== Controversy ===
The purchase terms of the ship resulted in controversy, with the Comptroller and Auditor General of India censuring the Indian Navy for a hasty purchase without exercising sufficient due diligence and for accepting restrictions on use and access. According to the report, the United States obtained an assurance that the naval ship could not be used for any offensive purposes, and had the right to regularly inspect it, under an end-user monitoring agreement that India and the US signed in 2009. In addition, no physical assessment was done by India prior to purchase and the US Navy reportedly did not reveal the need for upgrades and modifications.

A response to this criticism was that the ship was acquired primarily to aid the Navy in gaining vital operational information for expanding its amphibious warfare capabilities. The Chief of Navy Staff Admiral Nirmal Kumar Verma clarified that inspections by the United States are not intrusive, i.e. no boarding of the ship by US personnel is allowed. A team from the US Department of Defense examined night vision devices, which were taken out of Jalashwa for the inspection.

== Service history ==
On 1 February 2008, five Indian Navy personnel were killed, and three others critically injured by inhaling poisonous hydrogen sulphide (H_{2}S) gas aboard Jalashwa. The mishap occurred during an exercise in the Bay of Bengal, between Visakhapatnam and the Andaman Islands. Jalashwa immediately headed to Port Blair, with the critically injured seamen and two officers being airlifted from the ship. Lieutenant Commander Shwet Gupta and Lieutenant Ruchir Prasad were critically injured while trying to rescue their sailors. Gupta subsequently died of his injuries.

On 26 February 2011, INS Jalashwa and INS Mysore were deployed to the Mediterranean Sea under Operation Safe Homecoming to evacuate Indian citizens from Libya in the aftermath of the turmoil from the 2011 Libyan civil war. They carried their full air wings, and a contingent of MARCOS.

On 5 June 2023, a Varunastra heavyweight torpedo was test-fired by a Kamorta-class corvette at an Under Water Target System (UWTS) laid by INS Jalashwa. This was the first trial where the torpedo was equipped with High Explosive (HE) live warhead.

INS Jalashwa was a part of Exercise Tiger Triumph 24 conducted in March 2024. It was a "bilateral tri-service Humanitarian Assistance and Disaster Relief (HADR) Exercise" conducted including Indian Armed Forces, US Army and US Marine Corps in Bay of Bengal.

INS Jalashwa has undergone two refits. A short one, limited by financial constraints, helped the ship attain higher speeds. The second refit in 2012 was longer, and her radars and sensors were replaced with indigenous equipment. This reduced the navy's dependence on US-origin components, as it was uncomfortable with the US inspection regime.

On 27 August 2026, Jalashwa entered the dry dock of the Hindustan Shipyard for a major refit which included complex structural repairs, overhauls and modernisation works.

== Gallery ==
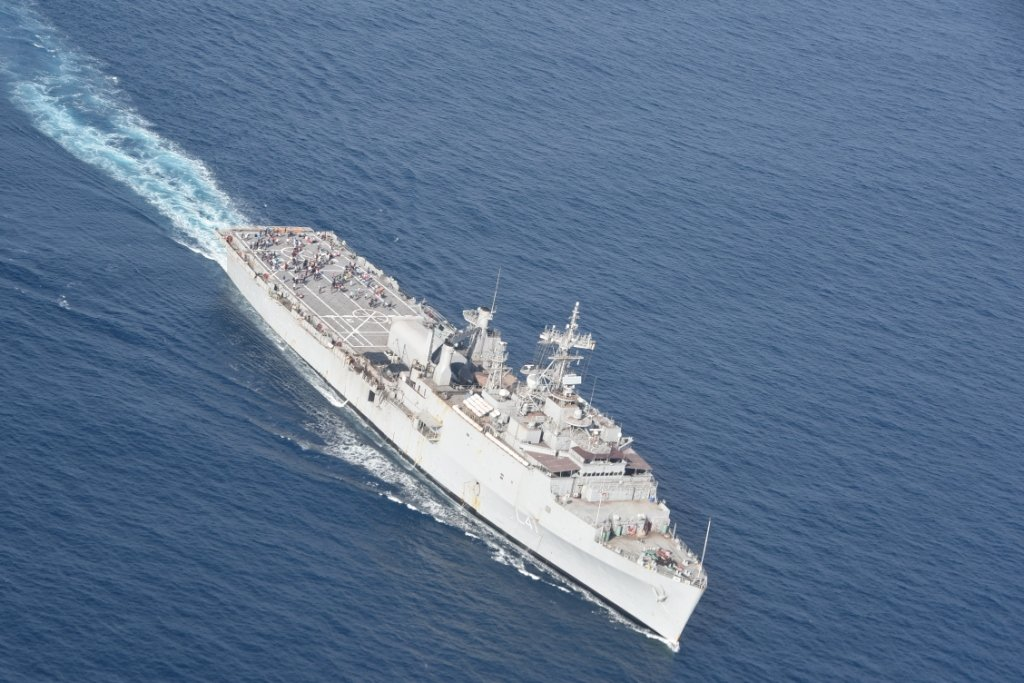
INS Jalashwa at sea en-route to Maldives.

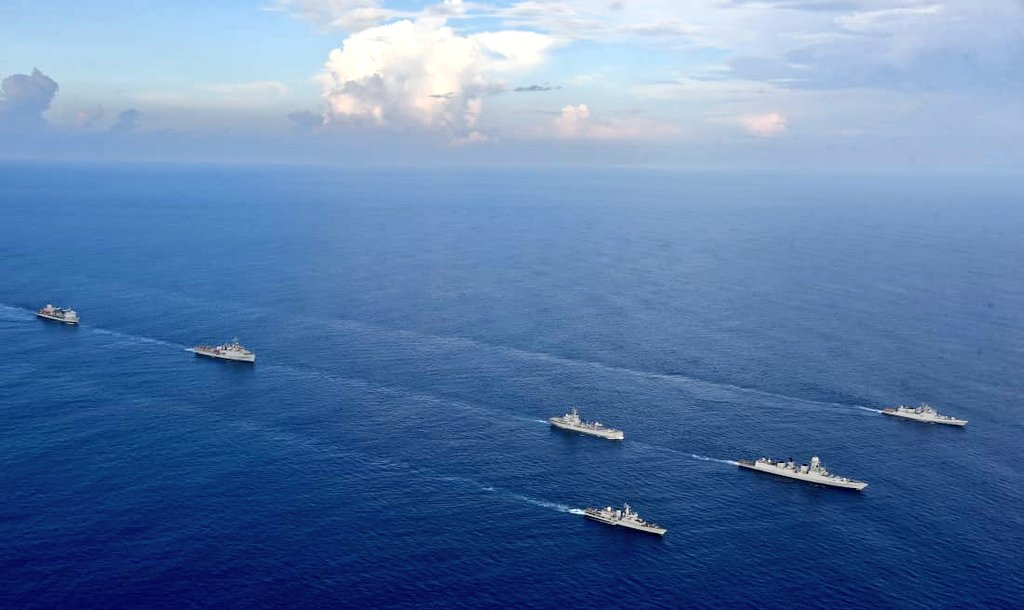
INS Jalashwa with Western fleet en-route to Maldives.

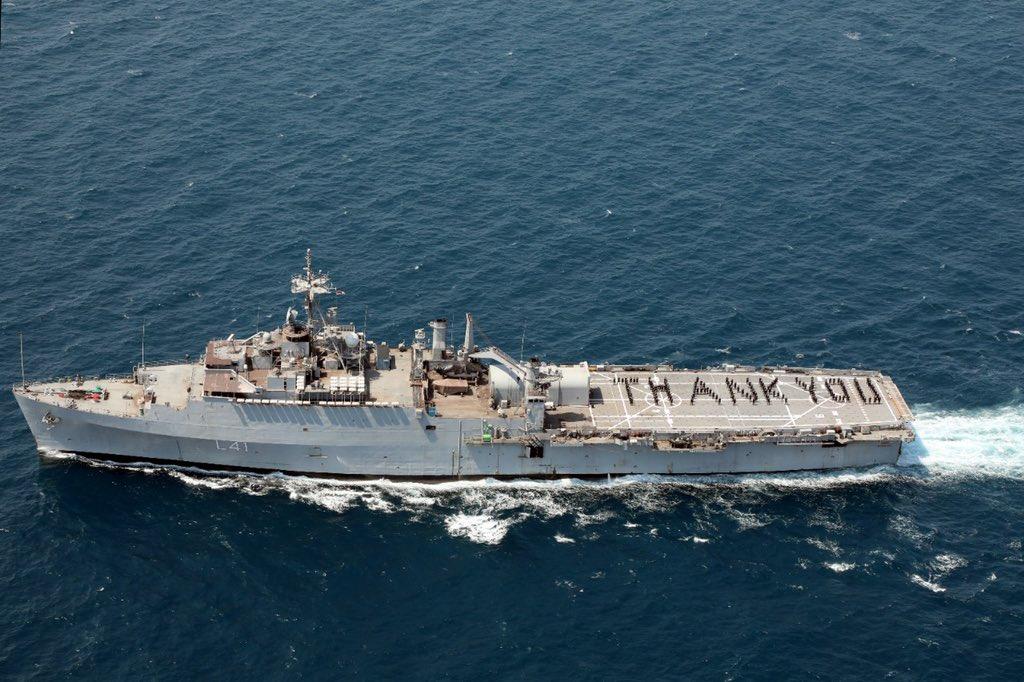
INS Jalashwa saluting Corona Warriors

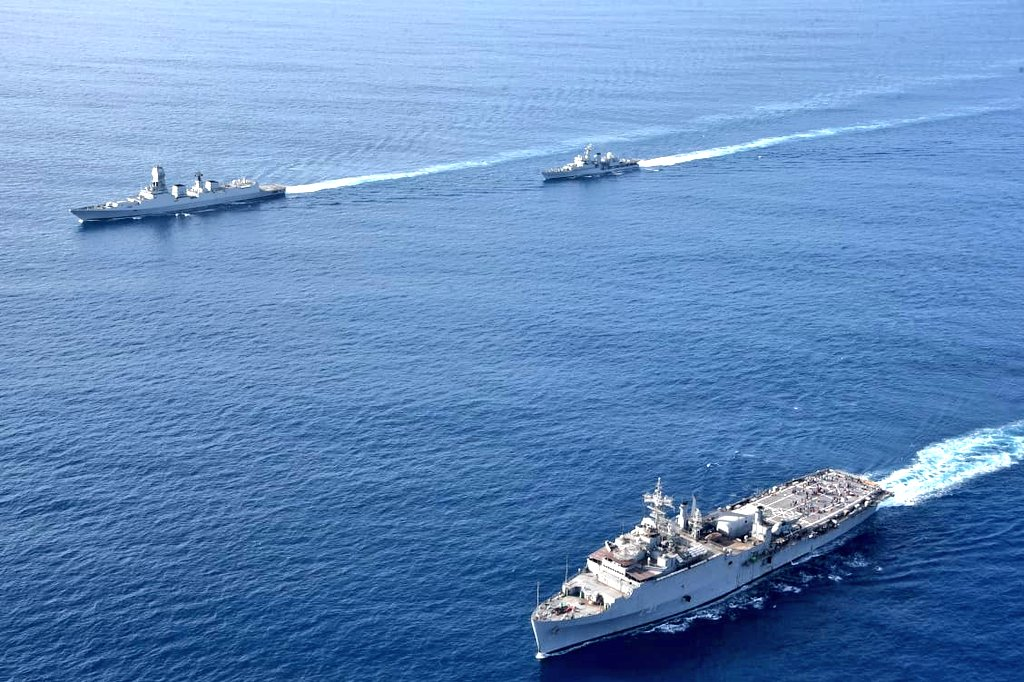
INS Jalashwa with INS Kolkata and Sukanya-class OPV en-route to Maldives.

== See also ==
- Indian Navy Multi-Role Support Vessel programme
- List of active Indian Navy ships
