= Operation Safe Homecoming =

2011 evacuation of Indian nationals during the Libyan Civil War

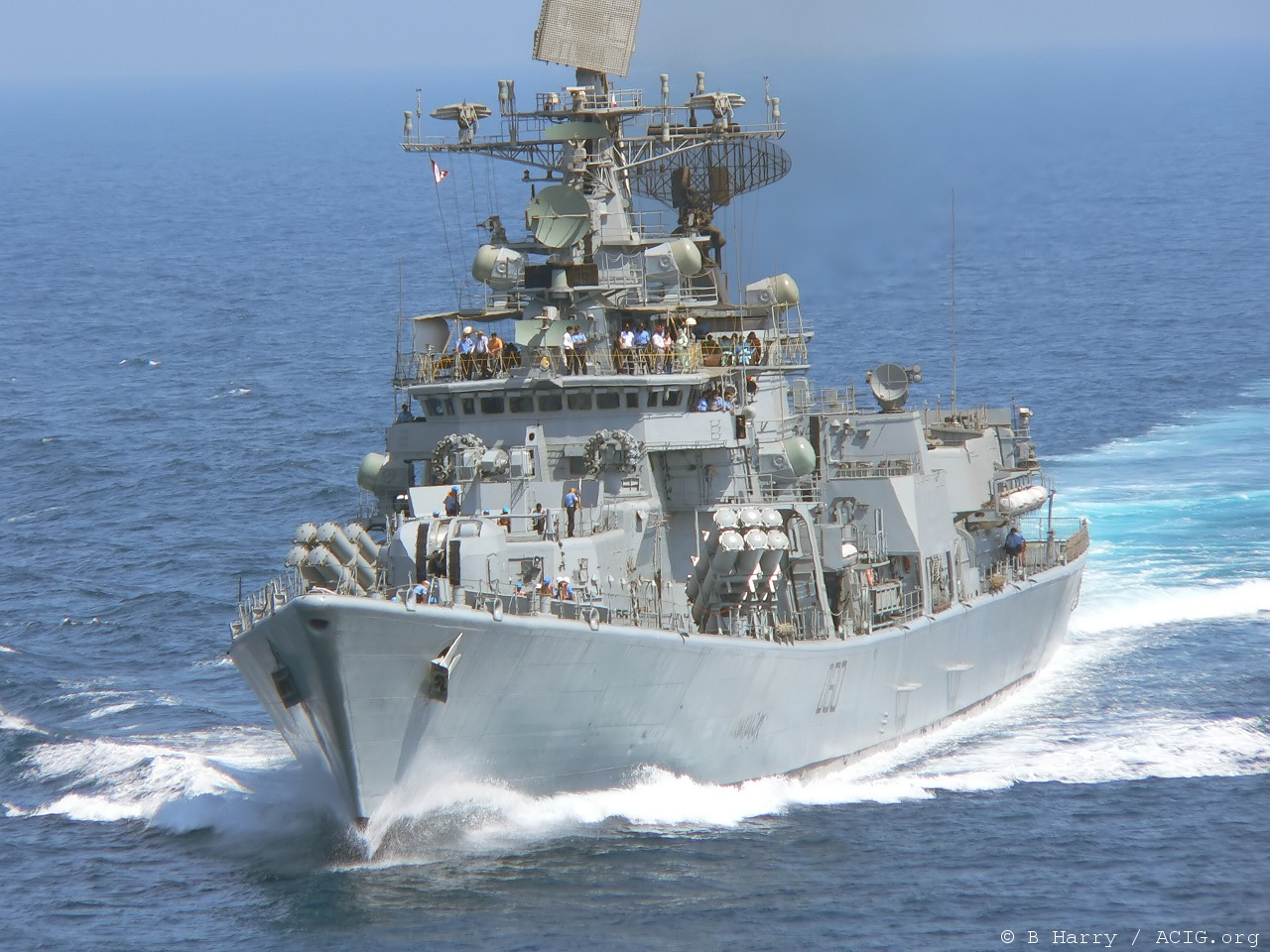
INS Mysore en route to Libya in 2011

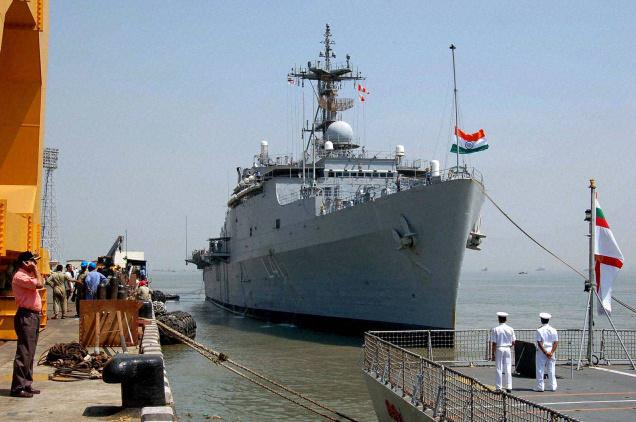
INS Jalashwa in Mumbai before proceeding to Libya

Operation Safe Homecoming was an operation launched by the Indian government on 26 February 2011 to evacuate its citizens who were fleeing from the Libyan Civil War. The air-sea operation was conducted by the Indian Navy and Air India. The last such operation was during the 2006 Lebanon War, when the Indian Navy and Air India were used in Operation Sukoon; before that, India evacuated 111,711 nationals after the 1990 Iraqi invasion of Kuwait.

== Background ==
The Libyan Civil War began as a series of protests and confrontations in the North African state of Libya against the government and its leader, Muammar Gaddafi. The social unrest began on 15 February 2011, and became a civil war which continued until 23 October of that year. The unrest was attributed to uprisings in Tunisia and Egypt, connecting it to the wider Arab Spring. According to NBC News chief foreign correspondent Richard Engel, who reached the city of Tobruk on 22 February, "The protest movement is no longer a protest movement, it's a war. It's open revolt." That day, The Economist described the events as an "uprising that is trying to reclaim Libya from the world's longest-ruling autocrat." Gaddafi blamed the uprising on al-Qaeda and "drugged kids".

== Operation ==
Eighteen thousand Indian nationals working in Libya were trapped because of the unrest. Evacuation appeared to be difficult due to "chaos" at the central airport in Tripoli, a "destroyed" runway at Benina International Airport, and the temporary closure of Libyan ports.

India ordered three naval ships—INS Mysore, INS Aditya and INS Jalashwa—to sail from Mumbai to Libya on 26 February. It chartered the 1,200-seat MV Scotia Prince and the 1,600-seat La Superba, based in Sicily, to sail to Libya as soon as port preparations were completed. The MV Scotia Prince set sail from Port Said on 26 February, and reached Benghazi two days later. The navy and charter ships evacuated passengers from Tripoli and Benghazi to Alexandria, and Air India flew the passengers from Egypt to India. Although the naval ships reached the Libyan coast by 8 March, much of the evacuation had already been carried out by the chartered ships and aircraft. The Indian government announced that the evacuation would be free of charge.

After Libyan authorities gave India permission to land in Tripoli, two Air India planes (a Boeing 747 and an Airbus A330) flew 500 passengers to New Delhi and Mumbai from Tripoli. Additional landing rights were requested for flights from Sabha Airport, where about 1,000 people were awaiting evacuation. In addition to Sabha, India was given permission to land planes at Sirte where another 1,000 Indians awaited evacuation. On 2 March, the Indian government ordered all private airlines to fly one flight each to Libya. The following day, two carriers (Jet Airways and Kingfisher Airlines) flew Indian nationals who had been ferried to Malta from the Luqa airport. On 3 March, an Indian Air Force Il-76 plane flew Indians to Cairo from Sirte.

Several Indian citizens had been crossing Libya into neighbouring countries overland. Some reached Sallum, Egypt from Tobruk and were met at the border by Indian embassy officials, who arranged a flight to Mumbai. Eighty-eight Indian citizens entered Tunisia at Ras Ajdir.

Indian Mariners Capt KP Rajagopal and Capt R Venkataramanan found the ship MV Scotia Prince, IMO No 7119836 negotiated, chartered it on behalf of Govt Of India Min of shipping through Shipping Corporation of India and CO-ORDINATED the program, joining of Crew, Replenishment of stores, Training of CREW and MEA Staff and routing. MV Scotia Price made 2 round voyages evacuating 1187 stranded Indian (including 8 infants) in the first voyage and 972 stranded Indian in the 2nd Voyage. The Job was done by the above two captains on a “Pro-Bono” basis for the sake of our nation and in the interest of the humanity while the Indian naval ships INS Mysore, INS Adithya and INS Jalashwa were waiting outside the territorial zone for escort duties if necessary. The operation necessitated 3 weeks of intense activities round the clock with continuous monitoring, reporting/ liaising with following salient features.

== Aftermath ==
On 5 March 2011, the Indian government announced that the evacuation would be completed by 10 March. After the evacuation of more than 15,000 Indian nationals, the operation ended on 11 March. About 3,000 Indian citizens decided to remain in Libya.
