= INS Mysore (D60) =

1993 Delhi-class destroyer

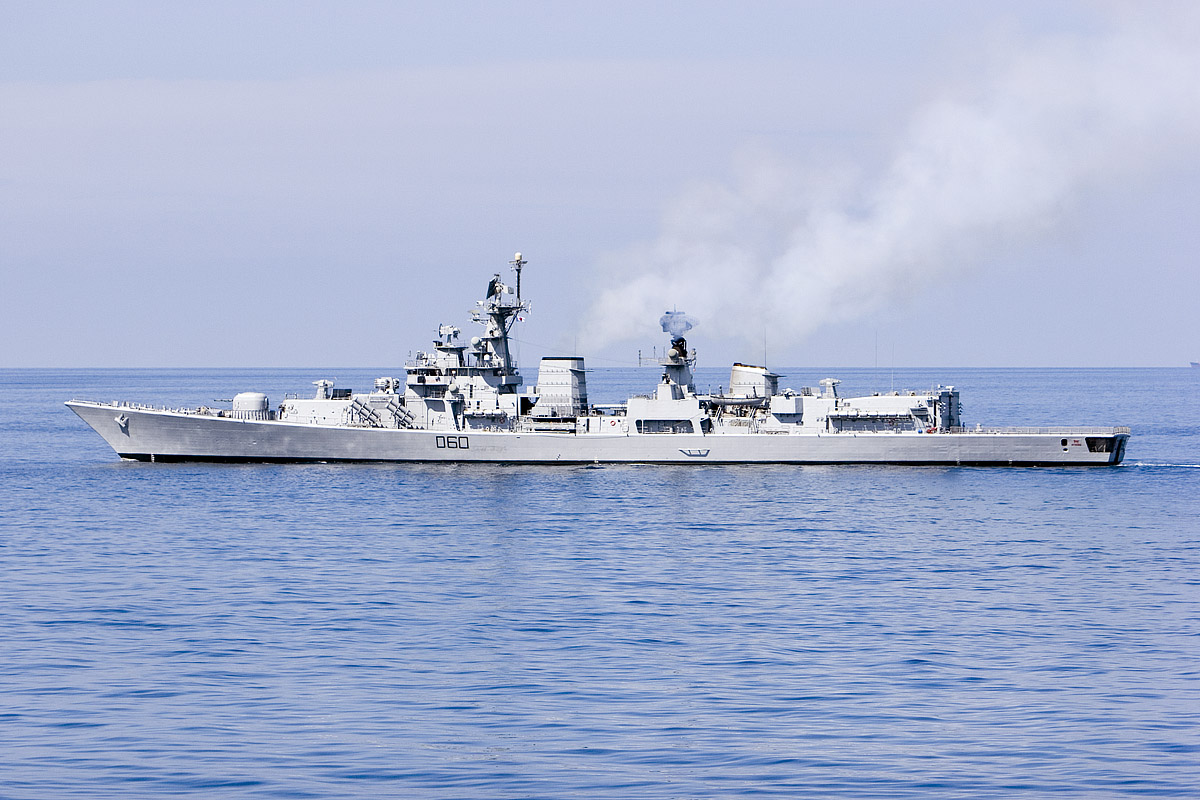
- INS Mysore

History

India
- Name: Mysore
- Namesake: Mysore
- Ordered: 20 March 1992
- Builder: Mazagon Dock Limited
- Launched: 4 June 1993
- Commissioned: 2 June 1999
- Identification: Pennant number: D60; MMSI number: 419621520; Callsign: VVRH
- Motto: Na Bhibheti Kadaachana (Sanskrit for Always Fearless)
- Status: Active

General characteristics
- Class & type: Delhi-class destroyer
- Type: Guided-missile destroyer
- Displacement: 6,200 tonnes (full)
- Length: 163 m (535 ft)
- Beam: 17 m (56 ft)
- Draught: 6.5 m (21 ft)
- Propulsion: 4 × Zorya-Mashproekt DT-59 gas turbines 82,820 hp (61,760 kW); 2 shafts with cp props
- Speed: 32 knots (59 km/h; 37 mph)
- Range: 4,500 mi (7,200 km) at 18 knots (33 km/h; 21 mph)
- Complement: 350 (incl 40 officers)
- Sensors & processing systems: MR-755 Fregat-MAE E-band air and surface search radar; Indra (TASL) Lanza-N L-band air surveillance radar [replaced from BEL RAWL (Signaal LW-08) D-band air search radar post refit]; 3 × MR-212/201 I-band navigation radars; 6 × MR-90 Orekh G-band fire-control radar (FCR); MR-184 I/J-band FCR; 2 × EL/M-2221 FCR; Granit Garpun B FCR; BEL HUMVAD hull-mounted sonar
- Electronic warfare & decoys: BEL Ajanta Mk 2 ESM; Elettronica TQN-2 jammer; 2 PK2 chaff launchers; Towed decoys
- Armament: 08 × BrahMos SSM (slant launchers); 32 × Barak 1; 48 × Shtil-1 SAM systems forward & Aft launchers; 1 × OTO Melara 76 mm naval gun (Replaced from AK-100); 2 × 30 mm AK-630M; 2 × RBU-6000 Launchers; Quintuple 533mm torpedo tubes; 2 rails of depth charges
- Aircraft carried: 2 × Sea King Mk 42B helicopters

INS Mysore is a Delhi-class guided-missile destroyer currently in active service with the Eastern Naval Command of the Indian Navy.

== History ==
INS Mysore was built at Mazagon Dock Limited in Mumbai. Her keel was laid down in February 1991 and she was launched on 4 June 1993. Sea trials began in the Arabian Sea in March 1999, and she was commissioned on 2 June 1999 with the then Prime Minister of India, Atal Bihari Vajpayee as the Chief Guest. Her first CO was Captain Rajiv Dhamdhere.

She is the successor to INS Mysore that served in the Indian Navy from 1957 to 1985. Her crest features a double-headed eagle (Gandaberunda) from the sigil of the erstwhile House of Wodeyar of Mysuru.

== Service history ==
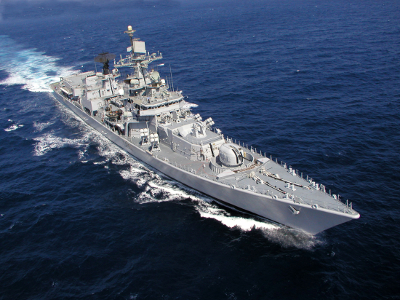
INS Mysore cruise top view

=== Colombo, 2008 ===
In August 2008, Mysore along with the destroyer Ranvir, were anchored just outside Sri Lankan territorial waters to provide security for the Indian prime ministers Dr Manmohan Singh, and other high-ranking officials at the 15th SAARC summit.

=== Gulf of Aden, 2008 ===
In November 2008, Mysore was deployed to the Gulf of Aden to replace the frigate Tabar as part of the Indian Navy's efforts to combat piracy off Somalia. On 13 December 2008, Mysore captured 23 sea pirates along with arms and ammunition when the pirates were trying to capture MV Gibe, a ship sailing under the Ethiopian flag.

=== Libya, 2011 ===
On 26 February 2011, Mysore deployed with the amphibious transport dock Jalashwa to the Mediterranean Sea under Operation Safe Homecoming to evacuate Indian citizens from Libya in the aftermath of the turmoil from the 2011 Libyan civil war. They carried their full air wings and a contingent of Marine special forces.

=== Indian Ocean, Independence Day Weekend 2011 ===
On 12 August 2011, the Indian Navy discovered an Iranian cargo vessel, Nafis-1, was off course. After two days of surveillance, it was suspected that the ship was hijacked by pirates. On 14 August, Mysore was called in to intercept the ship. The crew of nine hijackers, frightened after seeing Mysore, did not attempt any resistance. A helicopter with nine MARCOS Marines on board was sent to detain the suspects. The pirates' automatic assault weapons were found hidden in storage aboard the hijacked vessel.

=== Persian Gulf, 2014 ===
On 27 June 2014, Mysore deployed to Persian Gulf to evacuate Indians from Iraq during 2014 Northern Iraq offensive. During the operation, she was accompanied by the frigate Tarkash which deployed to the Gulf of Aden.

=== IFR 2026 ===
INS Mysore participated at the International Fleet Review 2026 held at Visakapatanam.

=== Samudra Laksamana 2026 ===
INS Mysore participated in the 4^{th} edition of Samudra Laksamana at Lumut Naval Base, Malaysia with the Royal Malaysian Navy ships KD Lekir and KD Gagah Samudera from 9 to 12 September 2026.

== Relocation ==
The Delhi class destroyers will be re-based to the Eastern Naval Command, Visakhapatnam. Along with Nilgiri-class, these will form a part of the carrier battle group of Vikrant. Mysore has already reached its new base and now its refitted with new INDRA-LANZA radar with Brahmos slant launchers.
