= MARCOS =

Indian Navy special operations force

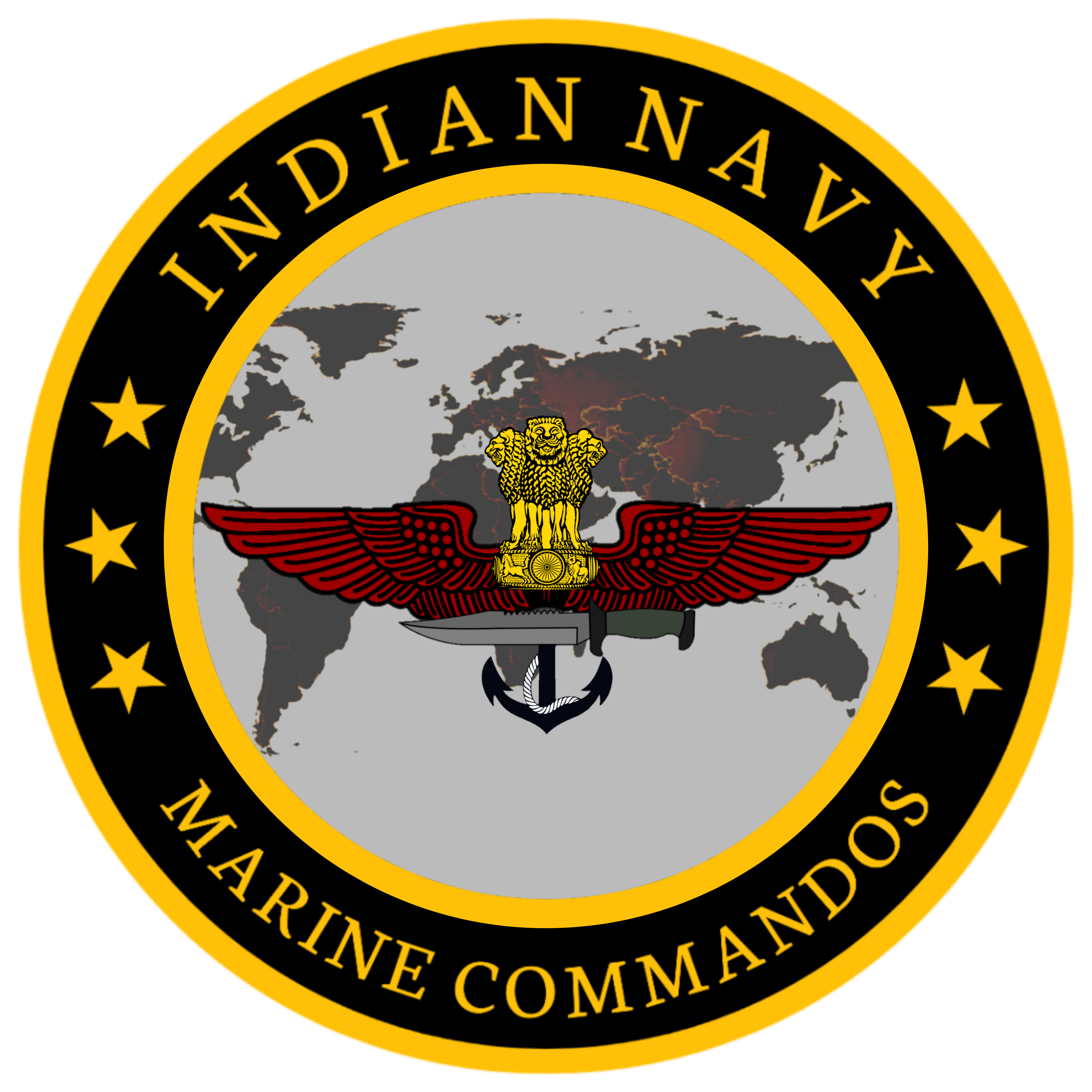
- MARCOS Patch
- Active: February 1987 – present (39 years, 9 months)
- Country: India
- Branch: Indian Navy
- Type: Special Operations Forces
- Size: 1,200-2,000 (est.) (Classified)
- Headquarters: INS Karna, Vishakapatnam, India
- Nicknames: Magarmach (The Crocodiles), Dadhiwala Fauj (The Bearded Army)
- Mottos: "The Few, The Fearless"
- Anniversaries: 14 February
- Engagements: Operation Cactus; Operation Leech; Operation Pawan; Kargil War; Operation Black Tornado; Operation Cyclone; Counter-insurgency operations in Kashmir; Operation Sankalp

Insignia
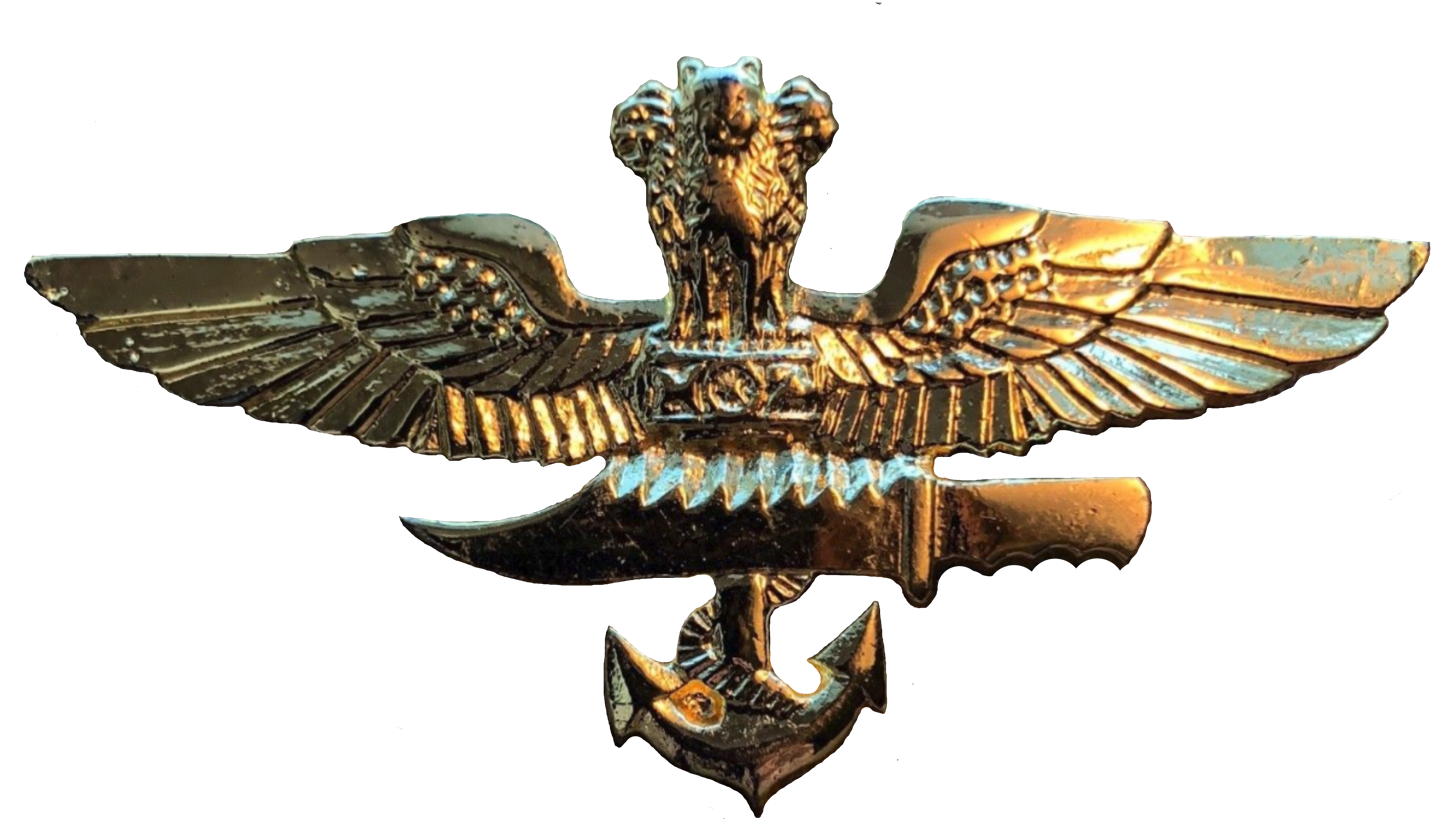
- MARCOS badge

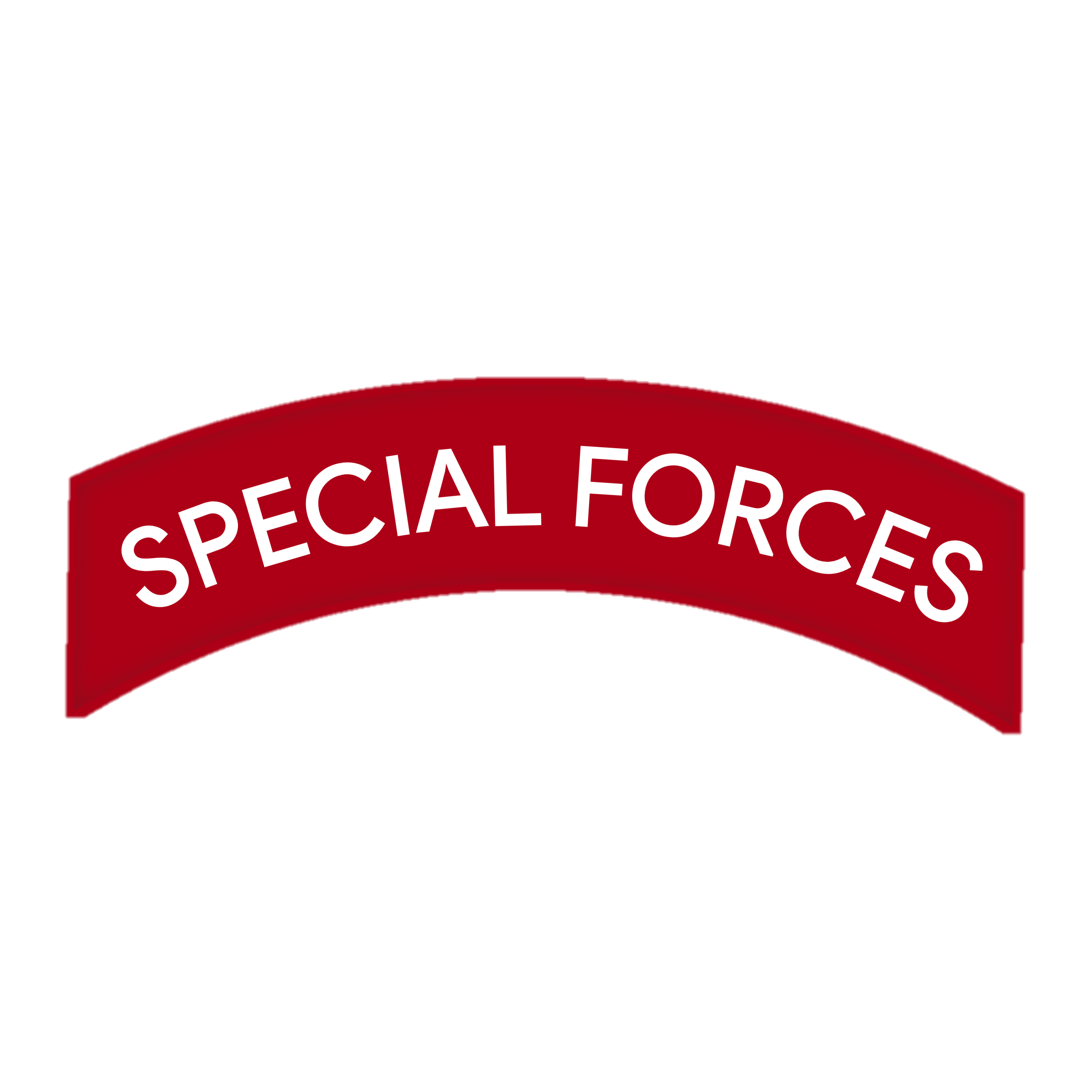
- Special Forces shoulder tab

The Marine Commandos, abbreviated to MARCOS, are the special forces of the Indian Navy. The MARCOS were originally named Indian Marine Special Force, which was later changed to Marine Commando Force to impart "an element of individuality" to it, according to the Indian Navy. The abbreviation 'MARCOS' was coined afterwards.

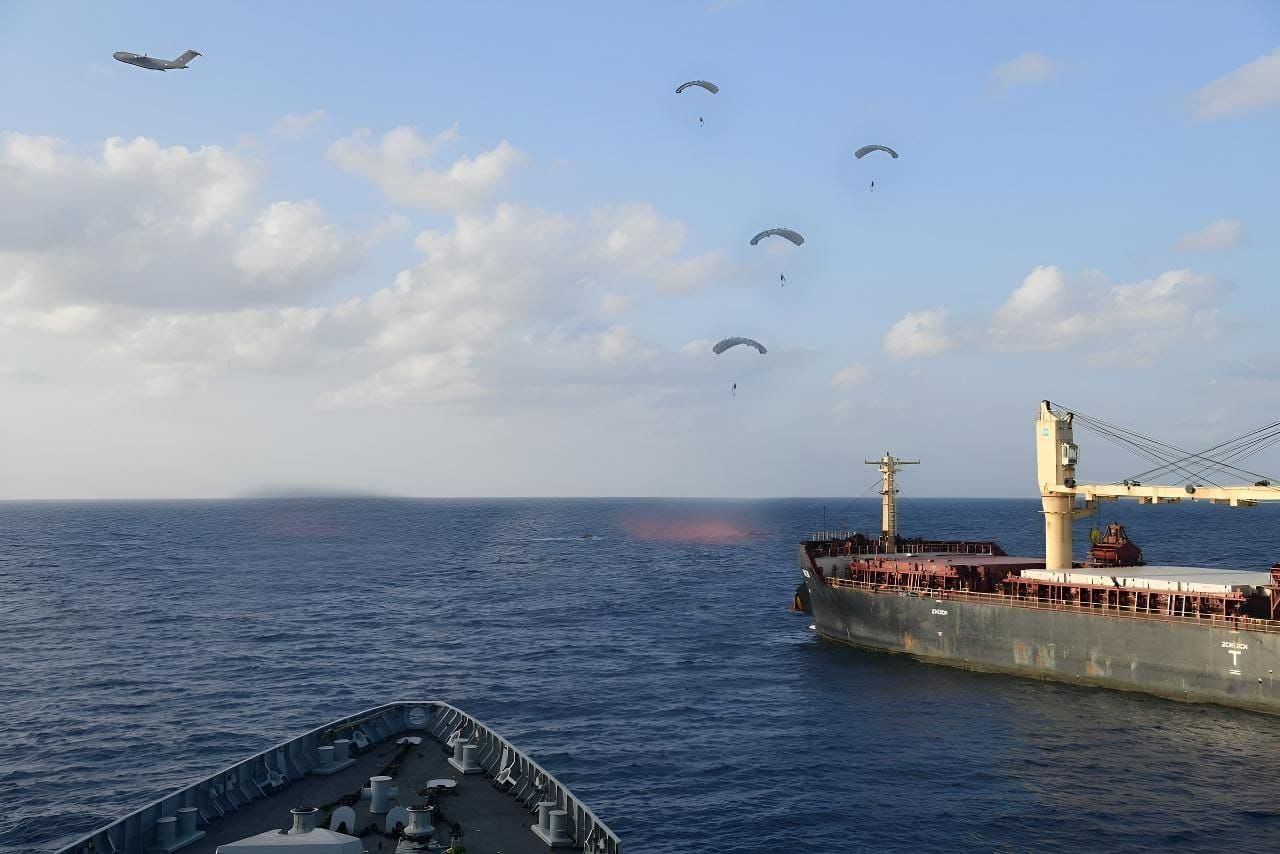
On 16 March 2024, IAF C-17, in cooperation with INS Kolkata, paradropped two Combat Rubberised Raiding Craft, armament load and two MARCOS Prahar teams were inserted to rescue 17 crew members of MV Ruen held hostage by 35 pirates.

The MARCOS were founded in February 1987. The MARCOS are capable of operating in all types of environments: at sea, in the air, and on land. The force has gradually acquired more experience and an international reputation for professionalism. The MARCOS regularly undertake specialised maritime operations in Jammu and Kashmir through the Jhelum River and Wular Lake, a 65 square kilometres (16,000 acres) freshwater lake, and conduct counter-insurgency operations in the region.

Some MARCOS units are a part of the tri-services Armed Forces Special Operations Division.

== History ==
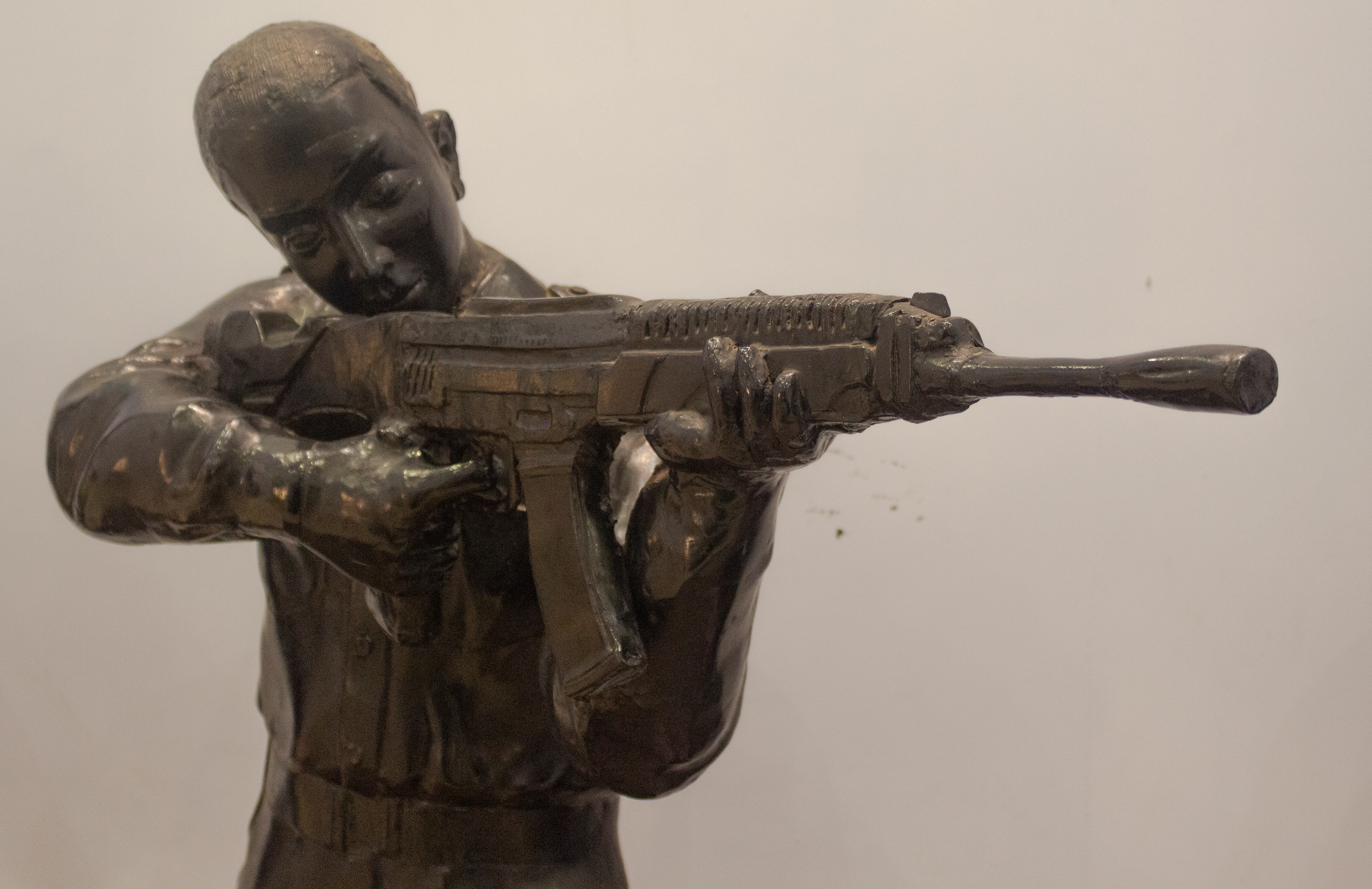
Statue of a Marine Commando on display at Visakha Museum

In 1955, the Indian military established a diving school at Cochin with the assistance of the British Special Boat Service and began teaching combat divers skills such as explosive disposal, clearance, and salvage diving. The combat divers failed to achieve their desired outcomes during the Indo-Pakistani War of 1971 as they were not adequately trained for sabotage missions.

The combat divers had also taught basic underwater demolition training to Muktibahinis (Freedom Fighters) from Bangladesh, who were then sent on missions during the war and inflicted heavy damage to a Pakistani logistics ship. The Indian Navy assisted the Indian Army in landing operations against the Pakistani military base in Cox's Bazar. After the war ended, army units were often drafted into amphibious exercises. In 1983, the Indian Army formation called the 340th Army Independent Brigade was converted into an amphibious assault unit, and a series of joint airborne-amphibious exercises were conducted in later years.

In April 1986, the Indian Navy started planning for the creation of a special forces unit that would be capable of undertaking missions in a maritime environment, conducting raids and reconnaissance, and counter-terrorism operations. Three volunteer officers from the diving unit, which was created in 1955, were selected and underwent training courses with the United States Navy SEALs at Coronado. They later went on training exchanges with the Special Boat Service. In February 1987, the Indian Marine Special Force (IMSF) officially came into existence, and the three officers were its first members.

The IMSF was renamed as 'Marine Commando Force' in 1991.

== Known activities and operations ==
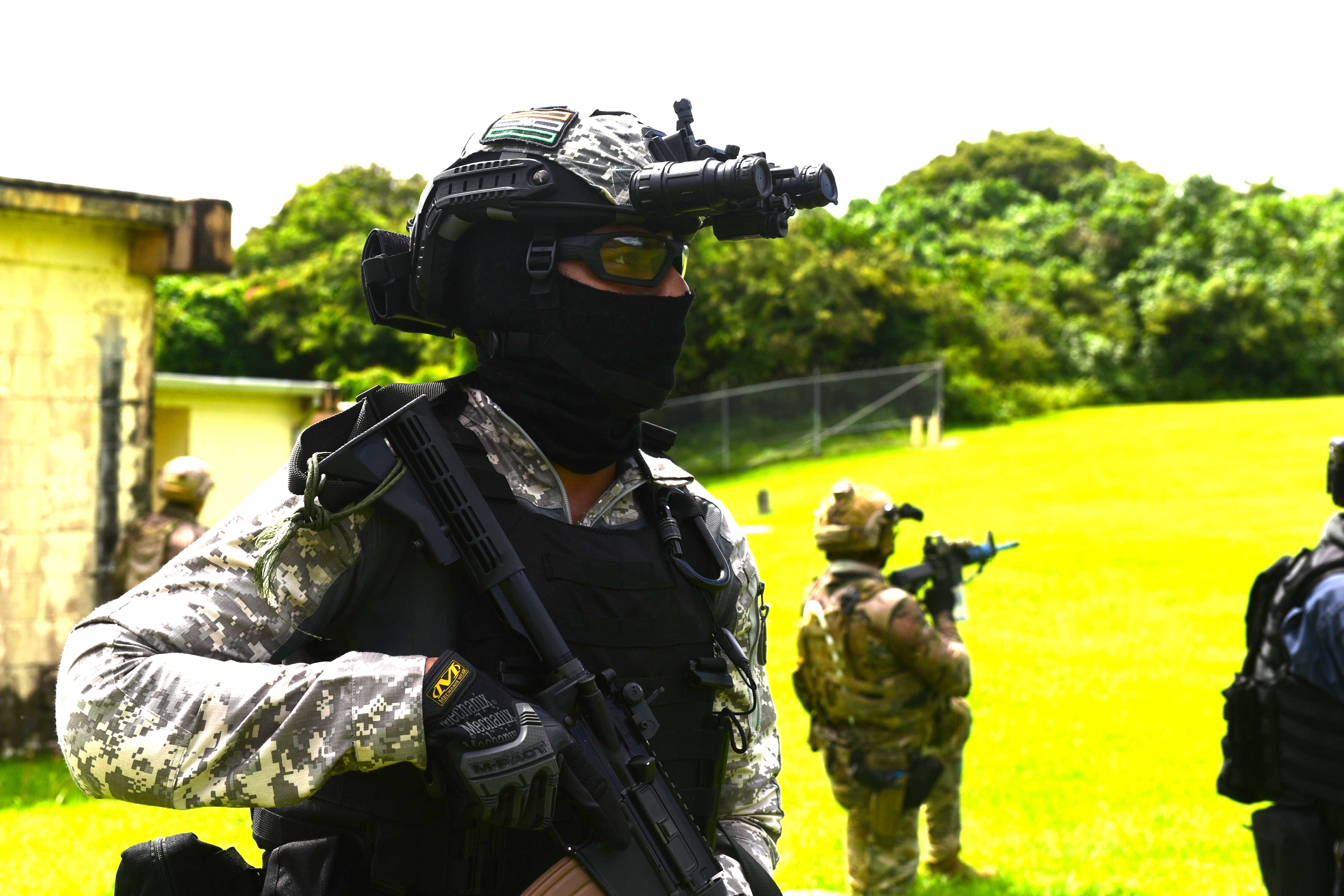
MARCOS and US Navy SEALs, Urban Combat Training, MALABAR (2021)

The MARCOS are capable of undertaking operations in all types of terrain but are specialised in maritime operations. The force has undertaken numerous joint exercises with special forces from around the world. As of 2012, the MARCOS has about 2,000 personnel, though the exact number remains classified. Operations undertaken by MARCOS usually remain classified; some of the known operations are:

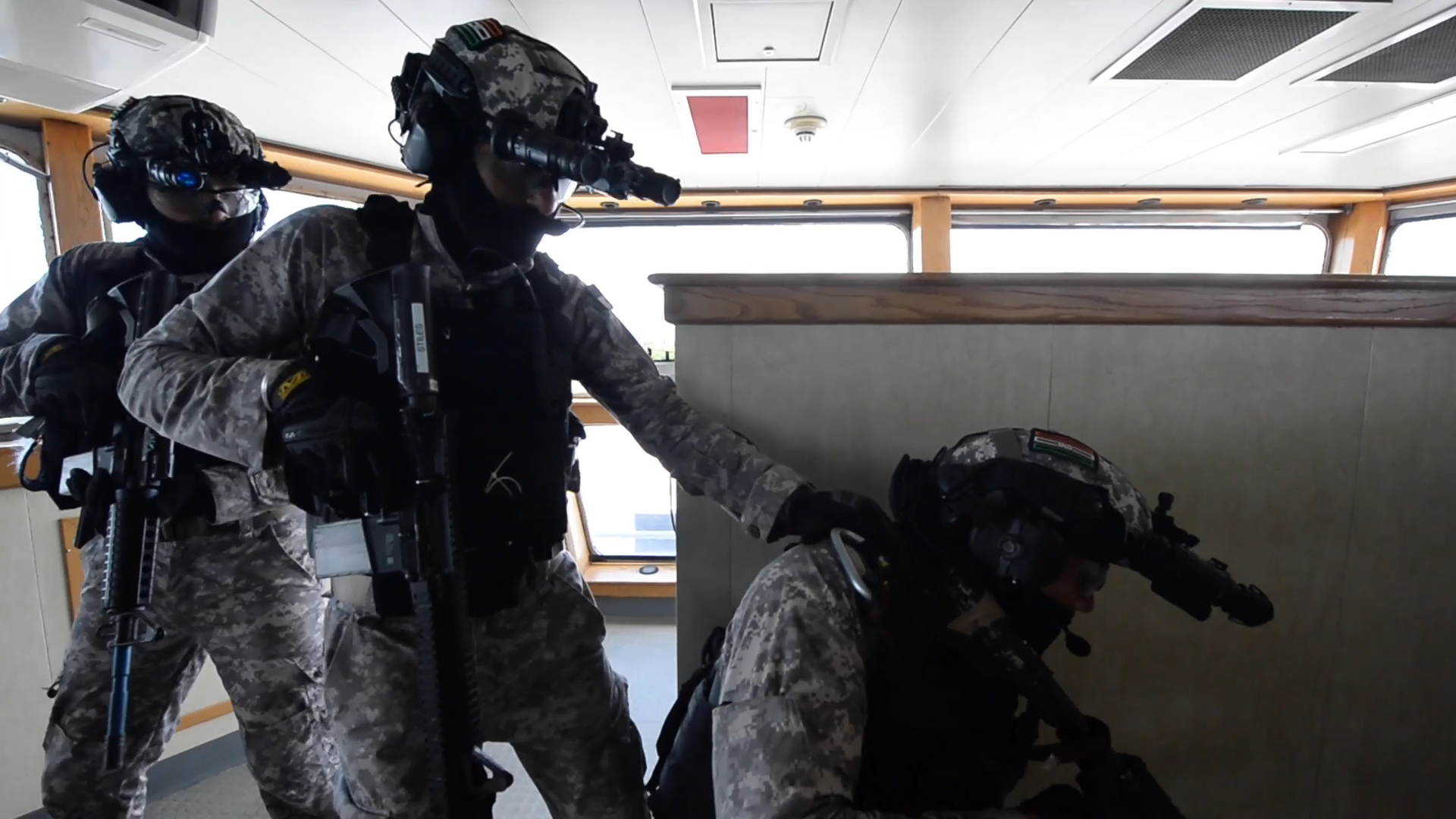
MARCOS performing a simulated Visit, board, search, and seizure (VBSS) exercise aboard MV Ocean Valor at RIMPAC 2022

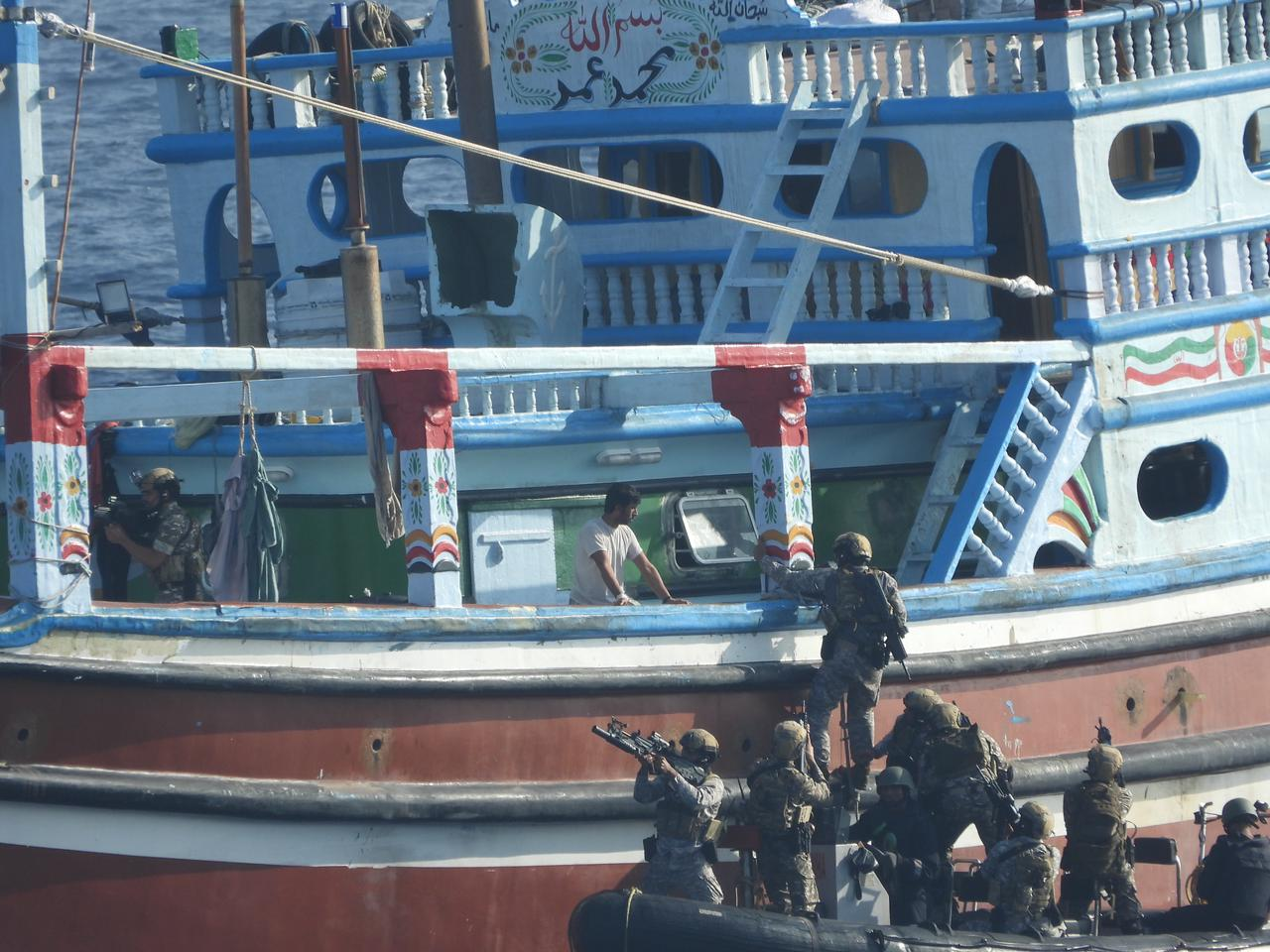
MARCOS boarding the Iranian flagged vessel FV Omari held captive by Somali pirates

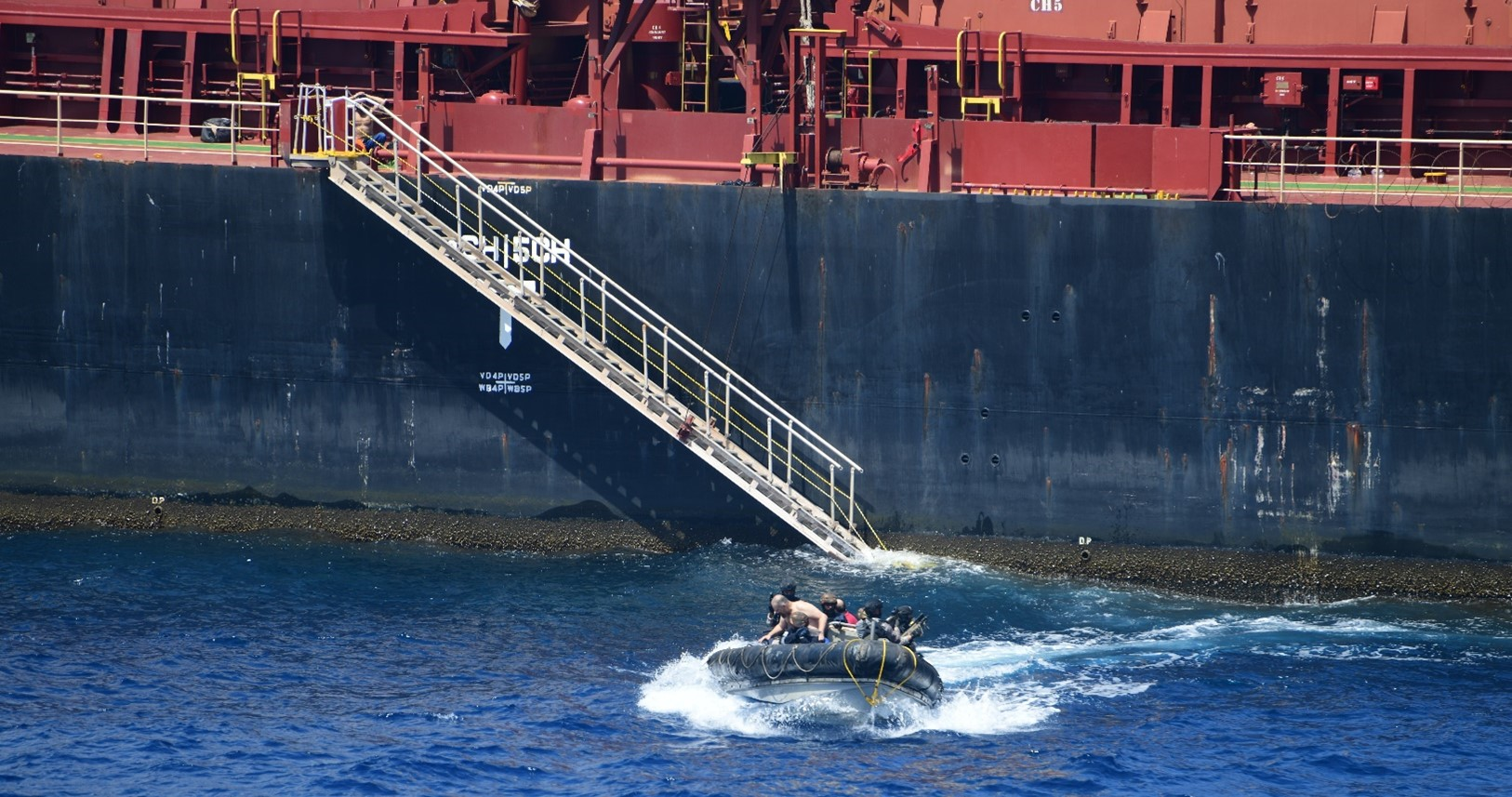
MARCOS rescued a Bulgarian crew member from the hijacked MV Ruen on 16 March 2024.

Name	Date	Notes
Operation Pawan	1987	The Indian Marine Special Force, as the MARCOS was then known, helped capture the harbours of Jaffna and Trincomalee, Sri Lanka, as part of the Indian Peace Keeping Force. On 21 October, MARCOS conducted a successful amphibious raid against a Liberation Tigers of Tamil Eelam (LTTE) base at Guru Nagar. MARCOS swam 12 km (7.5 miles) to their target with their combat load in a tow. They rigged the LTTE harbour with explosives without being detected. After they detonated the explosives and destroyed the harbour, LTTE militants started firing upon them. MARCOS fired back and swam to safety after the gunfight with no casualties. A team of 18 MARCOS were involved in this operation. The team was led by Lt. Arvind Singh (later retired as Commodore), an officer trained by the US Navy SEALs. He was awarded the Maha Vir Chakra for this mission.
Operation Cactus	1988	The MARCOS, as part of the Indian Navy contingent, defended the democratic government of President Maumoon Abdul Gayoom of the Maldives from a coup. The force played a supporting role in India's successful military aid, helping foil the attempted coup by Sri Lankan militants from the PLOTE and ENDLF. A group of 47 mercenaries attempted to escape by sea with 23 hostages on a hijacked vessel, MV Progress Light. The MCF was pressed into service along with INS Godavari, a multi-role frigate carrying Seaking helicopters and Alize aircraft operating from the Navy's base at Kochi. Godavari trailed the hijacked vessel for two days, firing intermittently on the vessel's superstructure. An Alize anti-submarine aircraft dropped two depth charges near the vessel, causing the militants to appear on the upper decks and surrender. A contingent of MARCOS operating from Ratmalana Airfield on the outskirts of Colombo, with some help from the Sri Lankan Army, boarded the ship and accepted the surrender of the militants and took them into custody.
Operation Tasha	1991	Operation Tasha, which was instituted after Operation Pawan wound up, was a coastal security operation on the Tamil Nadu coast to thwart operations of the LTTE there.
Operation Zabardust	1992	MARCOS personnel intercepted an LTTE vessel smuggling arms and ammunition.
UNOSOM II	1993	MARCOS were deployed off Mogadishu in support of the Indian contingent in Somalia. The team provided Maritime Special Operations support to the Naval Task Force.
Operation Rakshak	ongoing	Counter-insurgency (COIN) operations in Jammu and Kashmir: In the Jhelum River and Wular Lake, two to four teams of MARCOS are deployed through the year at Wular Lake. Militants were using this 250 km^{2} (97 square miles) lake, which is surrounded by mountains, to reach Srinagar, saving them from having to travel 100 km (62 miles) through the mountains. In 1995, a team of MARCOS was positioned at the lake, and within weeks, militant activity on the lake ceased. Some MARCOS personnel are also attached to the Army special forces units conducting counter-terrorism operations in the area. MARCOS use tactics similar to those of Israeli undercover special warfare units Mista'arvim, wearing beards and the 'pheren' (Kashmiri suit), making them indistinguishable from the locals. During Operation Rakshak, MARCOS have undertaken missions in which they have engaged and killed heavily armed militants. These operations have included close-quarters combat and intense gunfights. As of 2017, a team of 30 MARCOS personnel was permanently deployed in Wular Lake. MARCOS has also helped the Indian Army to eliminate militants from islands in the Jhelum River, where militants use plantations as hiding spots.
Kargil War	1999	MARCOS were involved alongside the Indian Army during the Kargil War.
Operation Rahat in Yemen	2015	In March 2015, the Indian Navy undertook this operation to rescue thousands of civilians from war-torn Yemen. Amid intense fighting and airstrikes being conducted by a coalition led by Saudi Arabia, MARCOS was tasked with ensuring the safe passage of civilians. Both Indian and foreign nationals were rescued during the operation.
Operation Black Tornado	2008	MARCOS stormed the Trident and Taj Hotels at Mumbai during the terrorist attacks on 26 November 2008 during the November 2008 Mumbai attacks.
Anti-Piracy	2008	In its first-ever action in the Gulf of Aden, MARCOS thwarted an attempt by pirates to capture the Indian merchant vessel MV Jag Arnav on 11 November 2008.
Exercise 'Balance Iroquois' 03-1/Vajra Prahar	2003	MARCOS participated in joint training exercises called Exercise 'Balance Iroquois' 03-1/Vajra Prahar with US Special Operations Forces in Mizoram.
Anti-Piracy	2008	On 13 December 2008, MARCOS units operating from the Indian Naval warship INS Mysore (D60) foiled a pirate hijack attempt of the Ethiopian vessel MV Gibe off the Somali coast. Twenty-three pirates were arrested.
Anti-Piracy	2011	On 16 July 2011, INS Godavari and MARCOS foiled a piracy attempt on a Greek ship, MV Elinakos, in the Gulf of Aden.
Anti-Piracy	2013	On 12 August 2013, the Indian Navy spotted an Iranian cargo ship Nafis-1 that was off-course in the Arabian Sea. Surveillance of the ship continued until 14 August, when a nine-strong MARCOS unit was deployed to intercept the ship via helicopter and support from the INS Mysore. The commandos detained the hijackers. The Iranian ship had reportedly sailed from Chah Bahar in Iran. Navy Intelligence reports said the ship was being used to smuggle weapons and contraband. A store of automatic assault weapons found on board was confiscated.
Anti-Piracy	2017	On 16 May, MARCOS responded to a distress call from a Liberian ship near the Gulf of Aden and thwarted a piracy attempt.
Anti-Piracy	2017	On 6 October, MARCOS rescued an Indian bulk carrier that had been overtaken by pirates in the Gulf of Aden.
Rescue of Dubai princess Sheikha Latifa	2018	On 4 March 2018, Indian special forces—suspected to be MARCOS—captured Dubai princess Sheikha Latifa off the coast of India and handed her over to authorities from the United Arab Emirates.
China-India skirmishes	2020	In October 2020, Hindustan Times reported that MARCOS are being deployed in the Eastern Ladakh alongside the Indian Army against the Chinese military. According to subsequent reports, MARCOS are present in the vicinity of the Pangong Tso lake where they will soon be conducting missions using boats.
Anti-Piracy and Red Sea crisis	2024	On 5 January 2024, MARCOS, based on the INS Chennai in the Arabian Sea, boarded and rescued 21 crew members from the hijacked vessel MV Lila Norfolk.
Anti-Piracy and Red Sea crisis	2024	On 18 January 2024, MARCOS and Naval Explosive Ordnance Disposal Team secured MV Genco Picardy following the drone attack by Houthi militia.
Anti-Piracy and Red Sea crisis	2024	During Marlin Luanda missile strike, MARCOS led Nuclear, Biological, and Chemical Defence (NBCD) and a firefighting team of 10 personnel battled for six hours to extinguish the fire.
Anti-Piracy and Red Sea crisis	2024	On January 24, 2024, MARCOS aboard INS Sumitra freed 17 Iranian hostages from Somalian pirates aboard the captured fishing vessel FV Iman.
Anti-Piracy and Red Sea crisis	2024	The fishing boat Al Naeemi, flying the Iranian flag, was found and intercepted on 29 January 2024 by MARCOS. 19 Pakistani crew members and the ship were safely freed from Somali pirate control.
Anti-Piracy and Red Sea crisis	2024	On January 29, 2024, MARCOS from INS Sharda, along with Seychelles People's Defence Force and Sri Lanka Navy, successfully rescued LORENZO PUTHA 04 from Somalian pirates.
Anti-Piracy and Red Sea crisis	2024	On 17 March 2024, INS Kolkata and a MARCOS PRAHARs (squad of 8 commandos) jointly operated to rescue 17 crew members and captured 35 pirates from MV Ruen, which was hijacked after a 40-hour-long operation under Operation Sankalp. The entire action was supported by INS Subhadra, UAVs and P-8I aircraft. The hijacked ship was acting like a mothership for the pirates. The operation, under the larger Operation Sankalp, was successful.
Anti-Piracy and Red Sea crisis	2026	Upon the request of Iran, Indian Navy MARCOS commandos paradropped from an IAF C-17 on 2rd November 2026 on a anti-piracy commando raid. They were dropped into the Arabian sea, near Somalia, then proceeded to storm and secure an Iranian fishing vessel Azini ,successfully eliminated the pirate threat, and safely freed the 20-man crew. They were again aided by mission deployed INS Kolkata, deployed over 3000 kilometers from Mumbai.

== Organization ==
=== Operational responsibilities ===
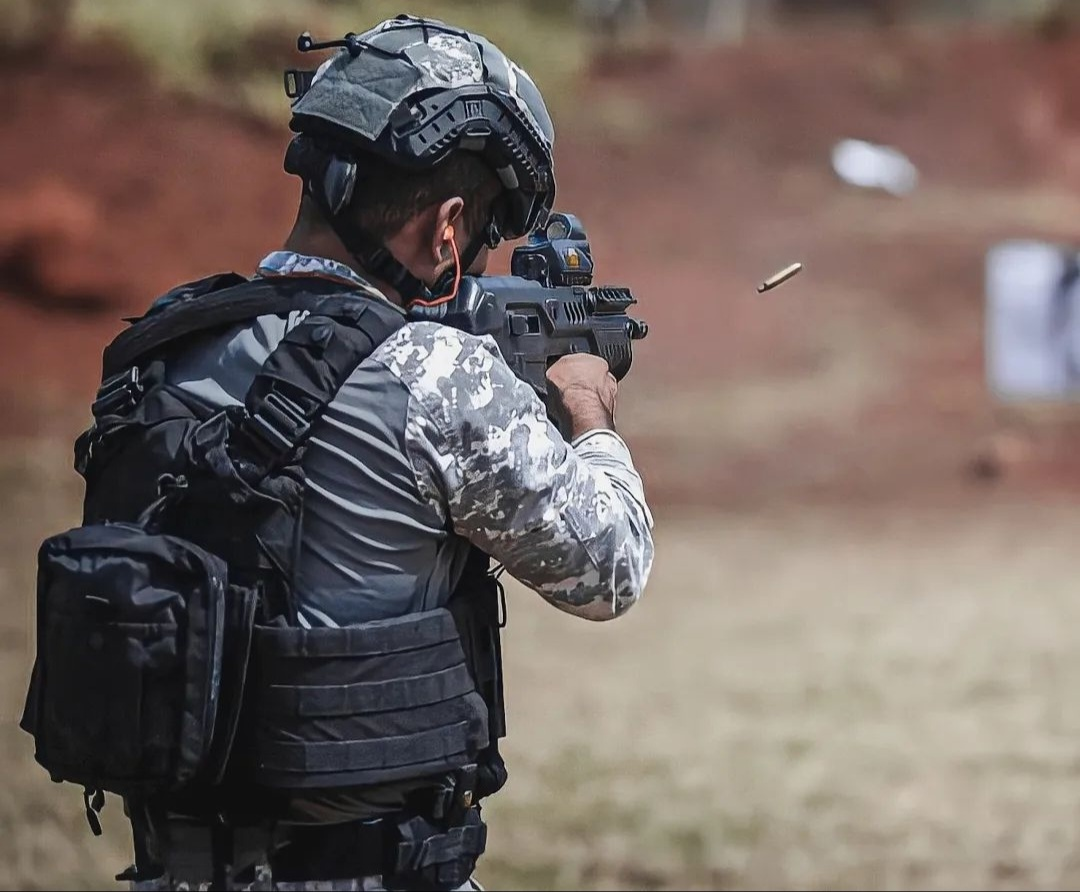

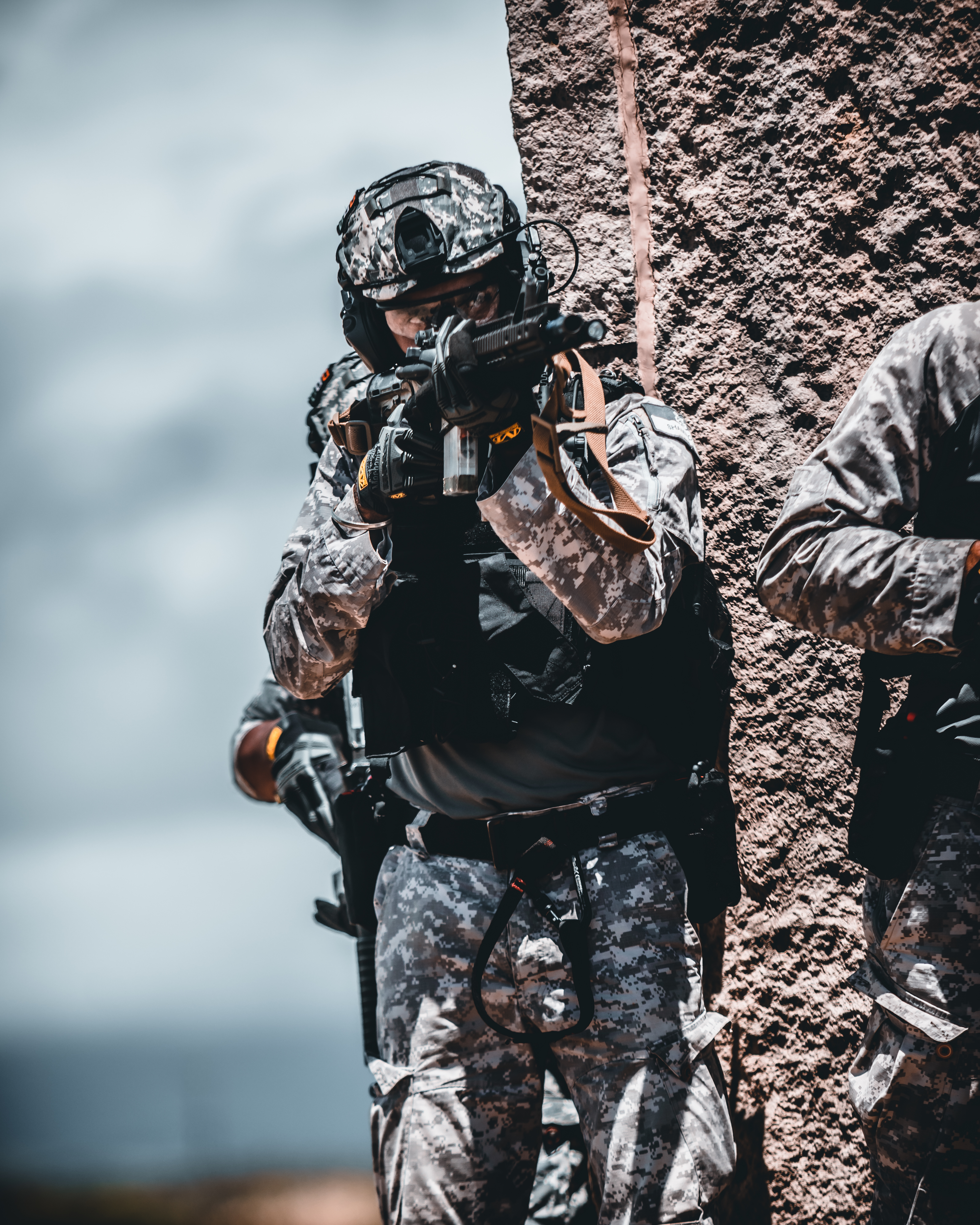
Indian Navy MARCOS during urban combat training at RIMPAC 2022

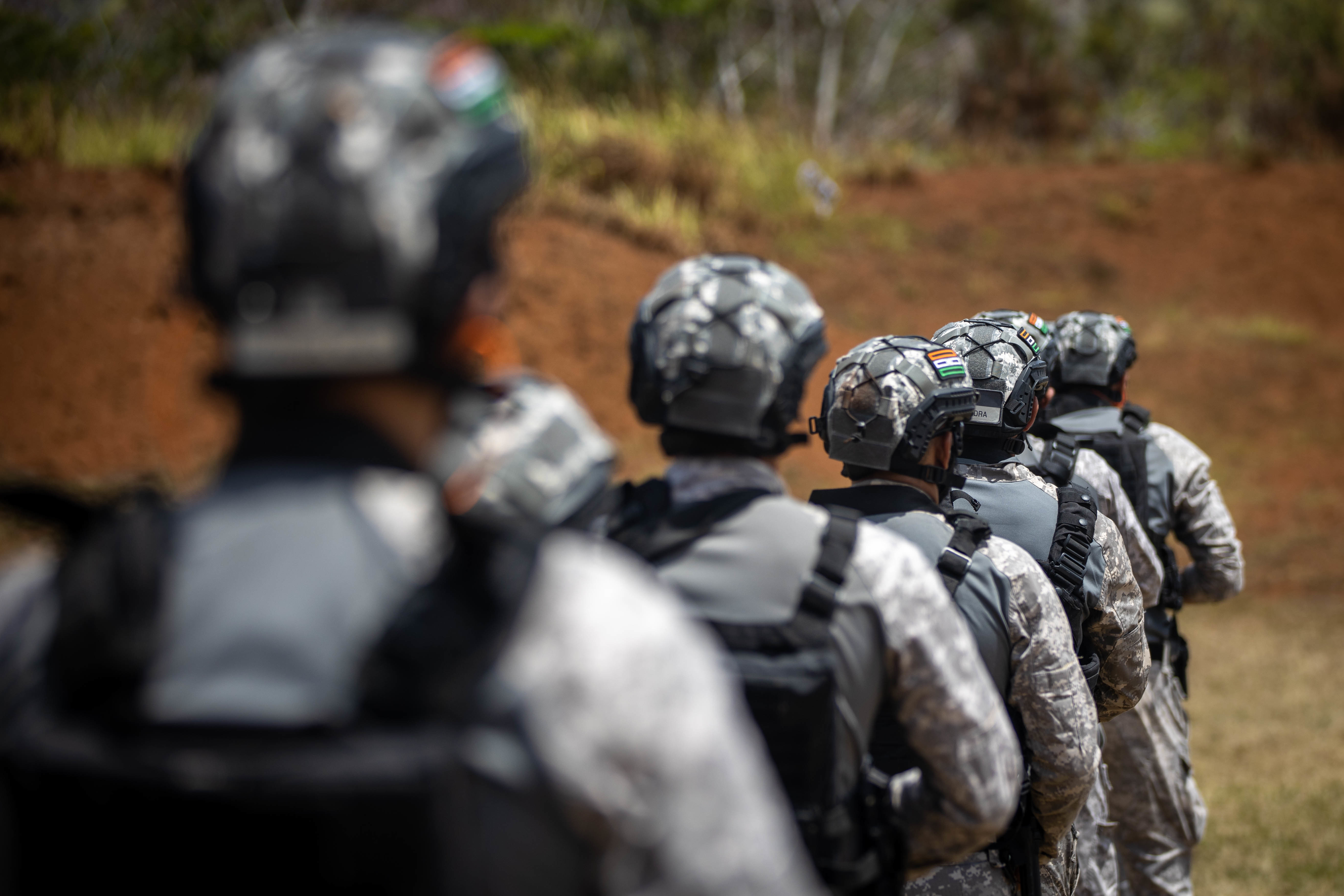
Indian Marine Commandos conduct live-fire lateral drills during Rim of the Pacific (RIMPAC) 2022.

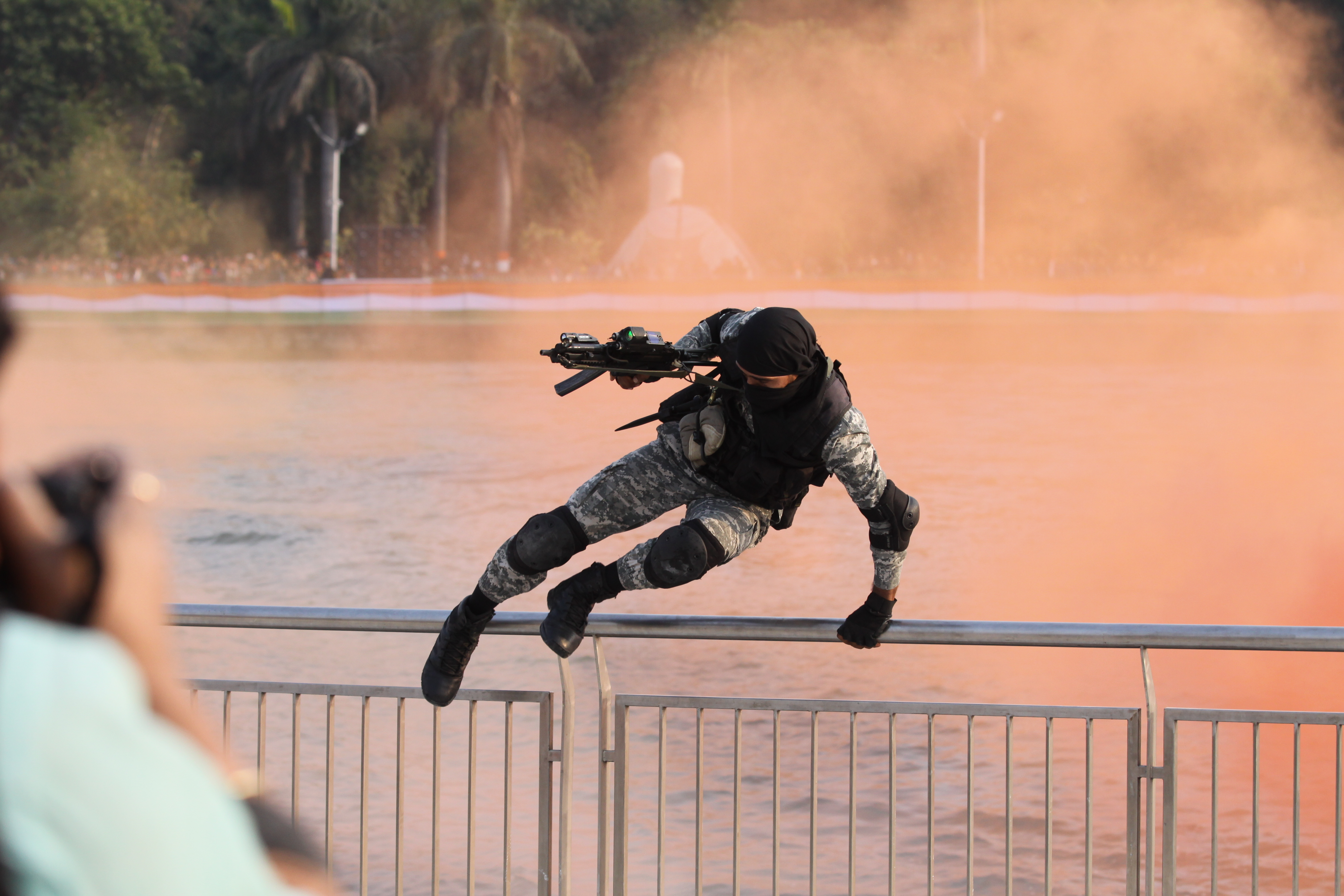
MARCOS at Defence Expo 2020

As a specialised force, the MARCOS is responsible for conducting operations at the strategic and the tactical level. MARCO operations are usually conducted in support of naval forces, although MARCOS are also deployed in other domains. The responsibilities of MARCOS has evolved with time. Some of the duties of MARCOS include:-

- Providing support to amphibious operations
- Special surveillance and amphibious reconnaissance operations
- Clandestine operations inside hostile territory, including diving operations and special raids
- Direct action
- Hostage rescue operations
- Counter-terrorism operations
- Asymmetric warfare
- Foreign internal defence

MARCOS can also assist the Indian Air Force in Suppression of Enemy Air Defences (SEAD) missions.

=== Bases ===
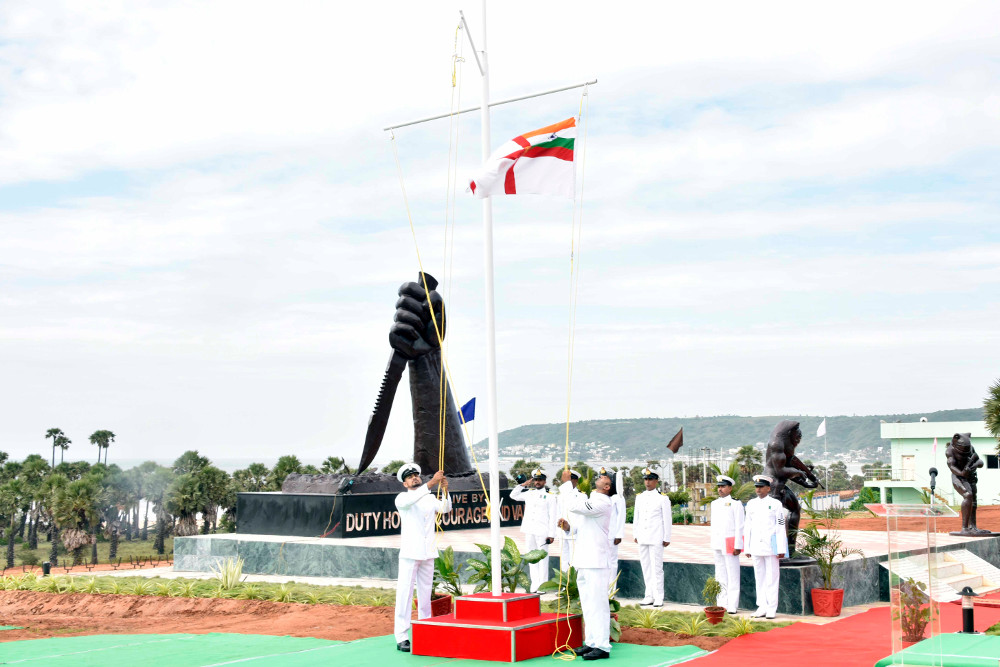
Commissioning of INS Karna, a dedicated base for MARCOS

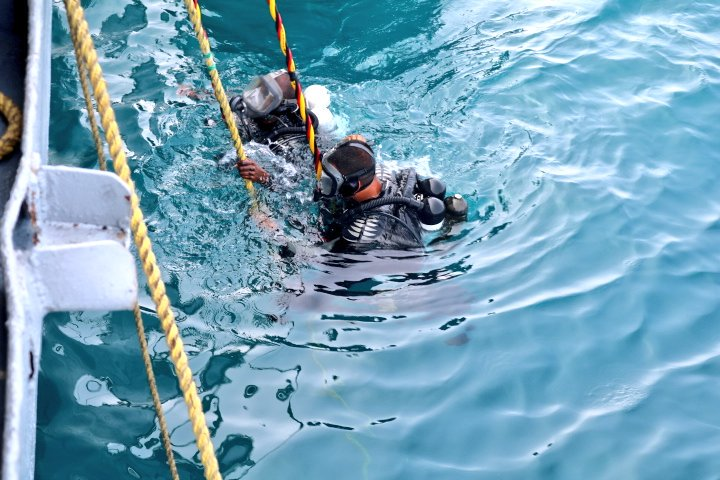
Diving training of MARCOS off the coast of Kochi

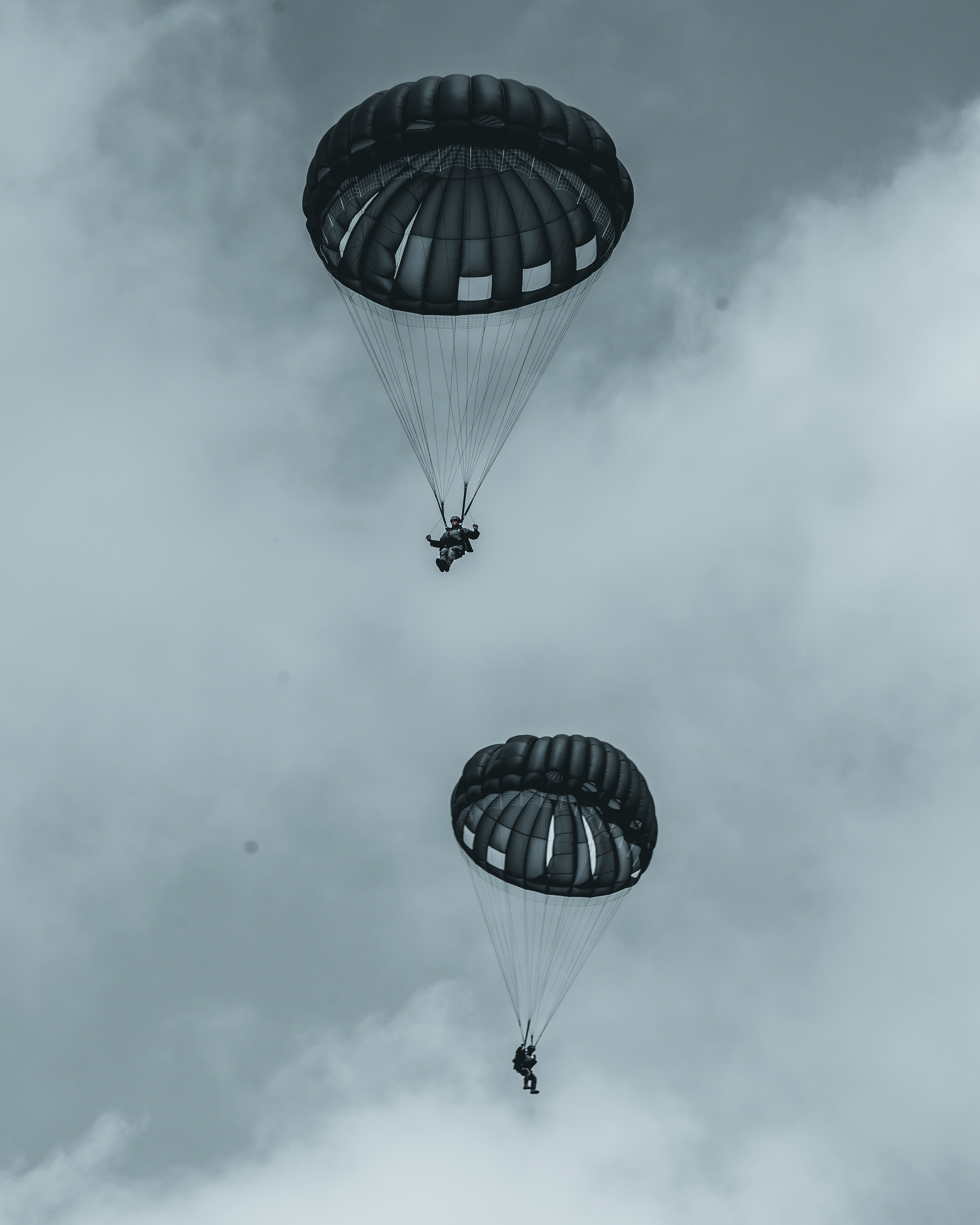
MARCOS are capable of para-dropping into the sea with a full combat load.

The MCF currently operates out of the naval bases at Mumbai, Visakhapatnam, Goa, Kochi and Port Blair. There are plans to shift the current training facility at the Naval Special Warfare Training and Tactical Centre to a new facility to be set up at the erstwhile Naval Academy in Goa.

INS Abhimanyu, located in Mumbai, was the base where MARCOS was formed. It is named after Abhimanyu, a character from the epic Mahābhārata. The base is a part of the Western Naval Command. It was created in 1974 and was commissioned on 1 May 1980. The Indian Marine Special Force (IMSF) was located there in 1987. On 12 July 2016, the naval base INS Karna was commissioned near Visakhapatnam as the garrison & permanent base for the unit. The smallest unit of MARCOS is known as Prahar and consists of eight commandoes.

== Selection and training ==
All MARCOS personnel are selected from the Indian Navy when they are in their early 20s and have to go through a stringent selection process and training. The selection standards are extremely high. Training is a continuous process. American and British special forces assisted in setting up the initial training program, which now consists of a seven and a half to eight months course for recruits. The training regimen includes airborne operations, combat diving courses, counter-terrorism, anti-hijacking, anti-piracy operations, direct action, infiltration and exfiltration tactics, special reconnaissance, and unconventional warfare. Most of the training is conducted at INS Abhimanyu, which is also the home base of MARCOS.

All MARCOS personnel are free-fall qualified (HALO/HAHO). A few also qualify to operate the Cosmos CE-2F/X100 two-man submarines. MARCOS train with the Special Forces officers of the Indian Army the Para SF at the Indian Special Forces Training School, Nahan and Army's other schools for unconventional warfare. These include the Junior Leaders' Commando Training Camp in Belgaum, Karnataka, the Parvat Ghatak School for high altitude mountain warfare in Tawang, Arunachal Pradesh, desert warfare school in Rajasthan, the High Altitude Warfare School (HAWS) in Sonamarg, Kashmir, and the Counter-insurgency and Jungle Warfare School (CIJWS) in Vairengte, Mizoram. These schools routinely host students from other countries. MARCOS are then trained at agencies within the Navy.

The pre-training selection process is made up of two parts. Indian Navy personnel who want to join MARCOS must undergo a three-day physical fitness and aptitude test. Within this process, 80% of the applicants are screened out. A further screening process known as 'hell's week' is similar to the United States Navy SEALs' "Hell Week". This involves a high degree of physical exercise and sleep deprivation. After this process, actual training begins. Around 80-85% of the volunteers who enroll fail to fully qualify as MARCOS.

The total duration of training of MARCOS is between seven and eight months. Recruits receive warfare training through field operations in counter-insurgency and anti-terrorist operations, and are trained to operate in any kind of environment and in situations like hostage rescue, urban combat, and piracy. A notably rigorous training program is the "death crawl"—an 800-metre (2,600 ft) struggle through thigh-high mud while loaded with 25 kg (55 lb) of gear and after a 2.5-kilometre (1.6-mile) obstacle course that most soldiers would fail. After that, when the trainee is exhausted and sleep-deprived, he must shoot a target 25 metres (82 ft) away, with a partner standing next to it.

The MARCOS are trained in every kind of weapon and instruments, including knives, crossbows, sniper rifles, handguns, assault rifles, submachine guns, and bare hands. Being divers, they can reach hostile shores swimming underwater.

Further training includes:

- Open and closed circuit diving
- Basic commando skills, including advanced weapon skills, demolitions, endurance training, and martial arts
- Airborne training
- Intelligence training
- Operation of submersible craft
- Offshore operations
- Counter-terrorism operations
- Operations from submarines
- Skydiving
- Various special skills such as language training, insertion methods, etc.
- Explosive ordnance disposal techniques

They are also trained to parachute into open water with full combat load. In 2013, the MARCOS introduced a larger duck-drop system that will be fitted on Ilyushin Il-76 aircraft. Each system of two boats can accommodate 32 commandos, their weapons, and fuel for the boats. Once para-dropped from the aircraft, it allows for the commandos to assemble inflatable motorised boats within ten minutes and quickly reach ships in distress. Such rescue missions can be mounted by the commandos deployed within an hour.

The MARCOS are also preparing for urban warfare and have begun practicing on 3D virtual models of offshore installations to ensure a swift response during a terrorist attack. The marine commandos undergo regular training sessions in this computer-generated programme to be well-prepared for a strike similar to the 26/11 attack.

The average MARCOS training dropout rate is more than 80%. The force has its own training facility as an adjunct to the operational company at INS Abhimanyu, Mumbai, later as the Naval Special Warfare Tactical Training Centre. For combat diving training, the commandos are sent to the Naval Diving School in Kochi. There are plans to move the Naval Special Warfare Tactical Training Centre to the erstwhile Naval Academy facility in Kerala, where it will focus on jungle warfare and counter-insurgency operations. The new facility will be modelled on the lines of CIJWS of the Indian Army in Mizoram.

== Future plans ==
=== Integrated Combat System ===
To strengthen the capabilities of MARCOS to carry out special operations, the Indian Navy will procure an advanced Integrated Combat System (ICS) that will ensure an effective command, control, and information-sharing structure to enhance the MARCOS' capabilities while engaging targets.

The ICS will provide enhanced capabilities such as tactical awareness and the ability to fight in hostile environments, and can enable Group Commanders to remotely monitor and control operations. It will help integrate an individual sailor's capability of surveillance, ballistic protection, communication, and firepower through an integrated network at the individual and group levels. Initiating the procurement process through a Request for Information (RFI), the Navy's Directorate of Special Operations and Diving has sought details from global vendors about the ICS.

The individual ICS equipment required by the Navy includes lightweight helmets, head-mounted displays, tactical and soft ballistic vests, along with communication equipment. The group-level gear requirements include command and control and surveillance systems, and high-speed communication equipment. The devices would have a sight for the sniper, a laser rangefinder and a long-range thermal imager, and a near-IR laser pointer for a combat group to undertake surveillance, reconnaissance, and targeting. The ICS would be compatible with assault rifles and close-quarter combat weapons. The Navy has recently started acquiring the Israeli IMI Tavor TAR-21 for the MARCOS.

=== Midget submarines ===
In 2013, Visakhapatnam-based Hindustan Shipyard won the contract for building four 500-tonne mini-submarines, which were designed by Larsen & Toubro. The mini-submarines, to be delivered in the latter half of the 2010s, will be used exclusively by the Indian Navy's MARCOS. As of 2023, the procurement of the midget submarines was still being planned by the Indian Navy.

== Equipment ==
=== Firearms ===
Pistols

- Pistol Auto 9mm 1A 9mm semi-automatic pistol
- Beretta 92FS 9mm semi-automatic pistol
- Glock 9mm semi-automatic pistol
- IWI Masada 9mm semi-automatic pistol
- IWI Jericho 941 9mm semi-automatic pistol

Sub-machine guns

- Heckler & Koch MP5 9mm sub-machine gun
- Uzi 9mm sub-machine gun
- MP-9 9mm sub-machine gun

Assault rifles

- AK-103 7.62×39mm assault rifle, since around 2003
- IWI Tavor 5.56mm assault rifle series
- IWI Tavor X95 5.56mm carbine
- M4 carbine 5.56mm carbine
- APS amphibious rifle 5.66×120mm underwater assault rifle

Sniper rifles

- SAKO Tikka T3 TAC 7.62mm bolt-action sniper rifle (177 units)
- IMI Galil 7.62 Sniper/Galatz 7.62mm semi-automatic sniper rifle
- OSV-96 anti-materiel rifle
- Heckler & Koch PSG1 7.62mm semi-automatic rifle
- SVDS 7.62x54mmR semi-sutomatic DMR
- VSK-94 9×39mm suppressed sniper rifle
- VSS Vintorez 9×39mm suppressed sniper rifle

Light machine guns

- IWI Negev NG-7 7.62×51 mm light machine gun
- IMI Negev SF 5.56×45mm light machine gun
- MG 2A1 7.62×51 mm general purpose machine gun

=== Support weapons ===
- GP-25 40mm under-barrel grenade launcher
- Arsenal UBGL 40×46mm under-barrel grenade launcher
- AGS-17 30×29mm automatic grenade launcher
- RCL Mk III 84mm recoilless rifle
- Shipon anti-tank weapon
- 9K38 Igla MANPADS

=== Transport ===
- HAL Dhruv utility helicopter
- Westland WS-61 Sea King transport helicopter
- Chetak helicopters
- Cosmos CE-2F X100 two-man swimmer delivery vehicle
- All-terrain vehicles (ATVs)
- Indian Navy Swimmer Delivery Vehicle (future)

== See also ==
- Special Forces of India
- United States Navy SEALs
- List of military special forces units
