= List of regiments and corps of the Indian Army =

This article lists the regiments of the Indian Army, including the various corps of supporting arms and services.

== History ==
=== Historic list of regiments ===
The following old lists in this section have been replaced by the present list provided in the subsequent sections:

- List of regiments of the Indian Army (1903)
- List of regiments of the Indian Army (1922)

== Regiments ==
=== Armoured ===
- President's Bodyguard
- 1st Horse (Skinner's Horse)
- 2nd Lancers (Gardner's Horse)
- 3rd Cavalry
- 4th Horse (Hodson's Horse)
- 5th Armoured Regiment
- 6th Lancers
- 7th Light Cavalry
- 8th Light Cavalry
- 9th Horse (The Deccan Horse)
- 10 Armoured Regiment
- 11 Armoured Regiment
- 12 Armoured Regiment
- 13 Armoured Regiment
- 14 Horse (The Scinde Horse)
- 15 Armoured Regiment
- 16th Light Cavalry
- 17th Horse (The Poona Horse)
- 18th Cavalry
- 19 Armoured Regiment
- 20 Lancers
- 21 Horse (Central India Horse)
- 41 Armoured Regiment
- 42 Armoured Regiment
- 43 Armoured Regiment
- 44 Armoured Regiment
- 45 Cavalry
- 46 Armoured Regiment
- 47 Armoured Regiment
- 48 Armoured Regiment
- 49 Armoured Regiment
- 50 Armoured Regiment
- 51 Armoured Regiment
- 52 Armoured Regiment
- 53 Armoured Regiment
- 54 Armoured Regiment
- 55 Armoured Regiment
- 56 Armoured Regiment
- 57 Armoured Regiment
- 58 Armoured Regiment
- 59 Armoured Regiment
- 60 Armoured Regiment
- 61 Cavalry
- 62 Cavalry
- 63 Cavalry
- 64 Cavalry
- 65 Armoured Regiment
- 66 Armoured Regiment
- 67 Armoured Regiment
- 68 Armoured Regiment
- 69 Armoured Regiment
- 70 Armoured Regiment
- 71 Armoured Regiment
- 72 Armoured Regiment
- 73 Armoured Regiment
- 74 Armoured Regiment
- 75 Armoured Regiment
- 76 Armoured Regiment
- 77 Armoured Regiment
- 81 Armoured Regiment
- 82 Armoured Regiment
- 83 Armoured Regiment
- 84 Armoured Regiment
- 85 Armoured Regiment
- 86 Armoured Regiment
- 87 Armoured Regiment
- 88 Armoured Regiment
- 89 Armoured Regiment
- 90 Armoured Regiment

=== Artillery ===
In the Regiment of Artillery the battalion-sized units are referred to as regiments, a point of confusion on occasion. These units are equipped and named based on their type of equipment. There are two types of units. The majority are regiments that have weapons as their equipment, such as missiles, rockets, field guns, medium guns or mortars. The second type of regiment are those that have mission support equipment, such as surveillance equipments and weapon locating radars.

==== Weapon equipped units ====
Weapon-equipped units of the Regiment of Artillery are listed below:

- 1 Field Regiment (Meiktila)
- 2 Medium Regiment (Self Propelled) (Letse and Point 171)
- 3 Medium Regiment
- 4 Medium Regiment (Self Propelled)
- 5 Field Regiment
- 6 Field Regiment
- 7 Field Regiment (Gazala)
- 8 Field Regiment
- 9 (Parachute) Field Regiment
- 10 Field Regiment
- 11 Medium Regiment (Zojila)
- 12 Medium Regiment
- 13 Field Regiment (Chushul and Gadra City)
- 14 Field Regiment
- 15 Medium Regiment
- 16 Field Regiment
- 17 (Parachute) Field Regiment (Zojila and Poongali Bridge)
- 18 Medium Regiment
- 22 Medium Regiment (Sittang and Yenangyaung)
- 23 Field Regiment (Ad Tecleasan and OP Hill)
- 24 Field Regiment (Self Propelled)
- 31 Medium Regiment
- 32 Field Regiment
- 33 Medium Regiment
- 34 Field Regiment (Cassino-II)
- 35 Field Regiment
- 36 Medium Regiment
- 37 Field Regiment
- 38 Field Regiment
- 39 Field Regiment (Laleali and Piquet 707)
- 40 Field Regiment (Asal Uttar)
- 41 Field Regiment (Kargil)
- 42 Medium Regiment (Dera Baba Nanak)
- 43 Field Regiment
- 44 Field Regiment
- 51 Medium Regiment
- 52 Medium Regiment (Sanjoi-Mirpur)
- 53 Medium Regiment
- 54 Medium Regiment
- 56 Field Regiment (Jitra)
- 57 Field Regiment (Sittang & Yenangyaung)
- 58 Medium Regiment
- 59 Medium Regiment
- 60 Medium Regiment
- 61 Medium Regiment
- 62 Medium Regiment
- 63 Field Regiment
- 64 Field Regiment
- 65 Medium Regiment
- 66 Medium Regiment
- 67 Field Regiment
- 68 Medium Regiment (Parbat Ali)
- 69 Medium Regiment
- 70 Medium Regiment
- 71 Field Regiment
- 72 Field Regiment
- 73 Field Regiment
- 74 Field Regiment
- 75 Medium Regiment (Basantar River)
- 76 Field Regiment
- 77 Field Regiment
- 78 Field Regiment
- 79 Medium Regiment
- 80 Medium Regiment
- 81 Medium Regiment
- 90 Field Regiment
- 91 Field Regiment (Asal Uttar)
- 92 Medium Regiment
- 93 Field Regiment
- 94 Field Regiment
- 95 Field Regiment
- 96 Medium Regiment
- 97 Field Regiment
- 98 Field Regiment
- 99 Medium Regiment (Sylhet)
- 100 Field Regiment
- 101 Field Regiment (Harar Kalan)
- 102 Field Regiment
- 106 Medium Regiment
- 108 Field Regiment (Kargil)
- 110 Medium Regiment
- 111 Rocket Regiment
- 113 Field Regiment
- 114 Medium Regiment
- 116 Medium Regiment
- 118 Medium Regiment
- 133 Medium Regiment
- 136 Field Regiment
- 137 Field Regiment
- 138 Medium Regiment
- 139 Medium Regiment (Kargil)
- 141 Medium Regiment (Kargil)
- 143 Medium Regiment
- 150 Field Regiment
- 153 Medium Regiment (Self Propelled)
- 154 Field Regiment
- 155 Field Regiment (Self Propelled)
- 158 Medium Regiment (Self Propelled) (Kargil)
- 159 Field Regiment
- 161 Medium Regiment (Basantar River)
- 162 Medium Regiment
- 163 Medium Regiment
- 164 Medium Regiment (Parbat Ali)
- 165 Medium Regiment
- 166 Medium Regiment
- 167 Medium Regiment
- 168 Field Regiment (Longewala)
- 169 Medium Regiment (OP Hill)
- 170 Medium Regiment
- 171 Medium Regiment
- 172 Medium Regiment
- 173 Medium Regiment
- 174 Medium Regiment (Sehjra)
- 175 Medium Regiment (Self Propelled)
- 176 Medium Regiment
- 177 Field Regiment
- 189 Field Regiment
- 190 Medium Regiment
- 191 Field Regiment
- 192 Field Regiment
- 193 Medium Regiment
- 194 Field Regiment
- 195 Field Regiment (Banwat)
- 196 Field Regiment
- 197 Field Regiment (Kargil)
- 198 Field Regiment
- 199 Medium Regiment
- 200 Field Regiment
- 207 Field Regiment
- 210 Rocket Regiment
- 212 Rocket Regiment (Kargil)
- 213 Rocket Regiment
- 214 Rocket Regiment
- 216 Medium Regiment
- 217 Field Regiment
- 218 Medium Regiment
- 219 Medium Regiment
- 220 Field Regiment
- 221 Field Regiment
- 222 Medium Regiment
- 223 Field Regiment
- 224 Medium Regiment (Self Propelled)
- 225 Field Regiment
- 226 Field Regiment
- 228 Field Regiment
- 230 Medium Regiment
- 237 Field Regiment
- 242 Medium Regiment
- 244 Field Regiment
- 246 Field Regiment
- 253 Medium Regiment
- 255 Medium Regiment
- 262 Field Regiment
- 268 Field Regiment
- 269 Medium Regiment (Self Propelled)
- 274 Field Regiment
- 278 Medium Regiment
- 281 Field Regiment
- 282 Medium Regiment
- 283 Field Regiment
- 284 Field Regiment
- 285 Medium Regiment
- 286 Medium Regiment (Kargil)
- 287 Field Regiment
- 288 Medium Regiment
- 290 Field Regiment
- 297 Medium Regiment
- 298 Field Regiment (Kargil)
- 299 Medium Regiment
- 301 Rocket Regiment
- 302 Medium Regiment
- 305 Field Regiment (Kargil)
- 306 Field Regiment
- 307 Medium Regiment
- 310 Field Regiment
- 311 Field Regiment
- 312 Field Regiment
- 313 Field Regiment
- 314 Heavy Mortar Regiment
- 315 Field Regiment (Kargil)
- 316 Medium Regiment
- 317 Field Regiment
- 318 Medium Regiment
- 320 Medium Regiment
- 321 Medium Regiment
- 322 Field Regiment
- 323 Medium Regiment
- 324 Field Regiment
- 325 Field Regiment
- 326 Field Regiment
- 327 Medium Regiment
- 328 Medium Regiment
- 329 Medium Regiment
- 330 Field Regiment
- 331 Medium Regiment
- 332 Field Regiment
- 336 Medium Regiment
- 337 Field Regiment
- 338 Medium Regiment
- 339 Medium Regiment
- 340 Medium Regiment
- 341 Medium Regiment
- 342 Field Regiment
- 343 Field Regiment
- 344 Missile Regiment
- 345 Medium Regiment
- 346 Field Regiment
- 354 Missile Regiment
- 371 Missile Regiment
- 501 Light Regiment
- 551 Rocket Regiment
- 581 Light Regiment
- 821 Light Regiment
- 831 Light Regiment
- 832 Rocket Regiment
- 841 Rocket Regiment
- 851 Light Regiment
- 852 Light Regiment
- 861 Missile Regiment (Laleali and Picquet 707)
- 871 Medium Regiment (Shingo)
- 872 Light Regiment
- 881 Missile Regiment
- 891 Field Regiment
- 908 Medium Regiment
- 1211 Medium Regiment
- 1811 Medium Regiment
- 1812 Rocket Regiment
- 1821 Light Regiment
- 1822 Light Regiment
- 1831 Medium Regiment
- 1832 Light Regiment
- 1841 Light Regiment
- 1842 Light Regiment
- 1851 Light Regiment
- 1861 Medium Regiment
- 1862 Light Regiment
- 1871 Field Regiment
- 1872 Rocket Regiment
- 1880 Rocket Regiment
- 1881 Rocket Regiment
- 1889 Missile Regiment (Kargil)
- 1890 Rocket Regiment
- 1900 Field Regiment
- 1905 Light Regiment
- 1906 Light Regiment
- 1907 Medium Regiment
- 1988 (Independent) Medium Battery
- 3342 Missile Regiment

The following units, designated as "Missile Group", are equipped with nuclear capable ballistic missiles like Prithvi and Agni. They operate under the Strategic Forces Command.

- 222 Missile Group (Prithvi-I missile)
- 333 Missile Group (Prithvi missile at Secunderabad)
- 334 Missile Group (Agni-I missile at Secunderabad)
- 335 Missile Group (Agni-II missile at Secunderabad with 12 TEL vehicles)
- 444 Missile Group (Prithvi-I missile)
- 555 Missile Group (Prithvi-I missile)

==== SATA units ====
Units of the Regiment of Artillery that have equipment other than weapons are listed below. These units mainly have Surveillance and Target Acquisition (SATA) equipment, Surveillance and target acquisition is a military role assigned to units and/or their equipment. It involves watching an area to see what changes (surveillance) for the purpose of enemy field artillery acquisition, then the acquisition of targets based on that information, and example of their equipment include Counter-battery radar (CoBRa) and Unmanned aerial vehicles (UAVs) (see also Mobile Artillery Monitoring Battlefield Asset (MAMBA)).

- 20 SATA Regiment
- 21 SATA Regiment
- 122 SATA Regiment
- 124 SATA Battery
- 125 SATA Regiment
- 126 SATA Battery
- 127 SATA Regiment
- 128 SATA Regiment
- 129 SATA Regiment
- 131 SATA Regiment
- 132 SATA Regiment
- 201 SATA Battery
- 202 SATA Battery
- 203 SATA Regiment
- 204 SATA Battery
- 205 SATA Battery
- 206 SATA Battery
- 229 SATA Battery
- 267 SATA Battery
- 279 SATA Battery
- 289 SATA Battery
- 617 SATA Battery
- 618 SATA Battery
- 619 SATA Battery
- 620 SATA Battery
- 621 SATA Battery
- 622 SATA Battery
- 623 SATA Battery
- 624 SATA Battery
- 625 SATA Battery
- 626 SATA Battery
- 627 SATA Battery
- 628 SATA Battery
- 629 SATA Battery
- 630 SATA Battery
- 631 SATA Battery
- 632 SATA Battery
- 633 SATA Battery
- 634 SATA Battery
- 635 SATA Battery
- 636 SATA Battery
- 637 SATA Battery
- 638 SATA Battery
- 641 SATA Battery

=== Infantry ===
Regiment	Active from	Regimental centre	Motto	War cry
Madras Regiment	1758	Wellington Cantonment, Tamil Nadu	"Swadharme nidhanam shreyah" ("it is a glory to die doing one's duty")	"Vira Madrasi, adi kollu, adi kollu" ("brave Madrasi, strike and kill, strike and kill!")
Rajputana Rifles	1775	Delhi Cantonment, Delhi	"Virabhogya vasundhara" ("the brave shall inherit the earth")	"Raja Ramachandra ki jai" ("victory to King Ramachandra")
Rajput Regiment	1778	Fatehgarh, Uttar Pradesh	"Sarvatra vijay" ("victory everywhere")	"Bol Bajrang Bali ki jai" ("say victory to Lord Hanuman")
Dogra Regiment	1877	Ayodhya Cantonment, Uttar Pradesh	"Kartavyam anvatma" ("duty before death")	"Jwala Mata ki jai" ("victory to Goddess Jwala")
Sikh Regiment	1846	Ramgarh Cantonment, Jharkhand	"Nishchay kar apni jit karun" ("with determination, I will be triumphant")	"Bole so nihal, Sat Shri Akal" ("shout aloud in ecstasy, true is the great eternal God!") "Waheguruji ka khalsa, Waheguruji ki fateh" ("the khalsa of Waheguru is victorious")
Jat Regiment	1795	Bareilly Cantonment, Uttar Pradesh	"Sangathan wa virata" ("unity and valour")	"Jat balwan, jai bhagwan" ("the Jat is strong, victory to God")
Parachute Regiment	1945	Bangalore Cantonment, Karnataka	"Shatrujit" ("the conqueror")	"Balidana param dharma" ("sacrifice, supreme duty")
Punjab Regiment	1761	Ramgarh Cantonment, Jharkhand	"Sthal wa jal" ("by land and sea")	"Bole so Nihal, Sat Shri Akal" ("shout aloud in ecstasy, true is the great eternal God!"); "Jwala Mata ki jai" ("victory to Goddess Jwala")
The Grenadiers	1778	Jabalpur Cantonment, Madhya Pradesh	"Nam, namak, nishan" ("name, salt, mark")	"Sarvada shaktishali" ("always strong")
Sikh Light Infantry	1944	Fatehgarh, Uttar Pradesh	"Deg tegh fateh" ("victory to charity and arms")	"Bole so Nihal, Sat Shri Akal" ("shout aloud in ecstasy, true is the great eternal God!")
Maratha Light Infantry	1768	Belgaum Cantonment, Karnataka	"Duty, honour, courage"	"Bola Shri Chhatrapati Shivaji Maharaj ki jai ("say victory to King Shivaji); "Temlai Mata ki jai" ("victory to Goddess Temlai"); Hara Hara Mahadeva ("hail to Lord Shiva")
Garhwal Rifles	1887	Lansdowne, Uttarakhand	"Yuddhaya kritanishchayah" ("fight with determination")	"Badrivishal lal ki jai" ("victory to the sons of great Lord Badrinath")
Kumaon Regiment	1813	Ranikhet, Uttarakhand	"Parakramo vijayate" ("valour triumphs")	"Kalika Mata ki jai" ("victory to Goddess Kali"); "Bajrang Bali ki jai" ("victory to Lord Hanuman"); "Dada Kishan ki jai" ("victory to Lord Krishna")
Assam Regiment	1941	Shillong Cantonment, Meghalaya	"Assam vikram" ("unique valour")	"Rhino charge"
Bihar Regiment	1941	Danapur Cantonment, Bihar	"Karma hi dharma" ("work is worship")	"Bajrang Bali ki jai" ("victory to Lord Hanuman"); "Birsa Munda ki jai" ("victory to Birsa Munda")
Mahar Regiment	1815	Sagar Cantonment, Madhya Pradesh	"Yash siddhi" ("success and attainment")	"Bolo Hindustan ki jai" ("say victory to India")
Jammu and Kashmir Rifles	1821	Jabalpur Cantonment, Madhya Pradesh	"Prashasta ranavirata" ("valour in battle is praiseworthy")	"Durga Mata ki jai" ("victory to Goddess Durga")
Jammu and Kashmir Light Infantry	1947	Srinagar, Jammu and Kashmir	"Balidanam vira lakshanam " ("sacrifice is a characteristic of the brave")	"Bharat Mata ki jai" ("victory to Mother India")
Naga Regiment	1970	Ranikhet, Uttarakhand	"Parakramo vijayate" ("valour triumphs")	"Jai Durga Naga" ("victory to Durga Naga")
1st Gorkha Rifles (The Malaun Regiment)	1815	Sabathu, Himachal Pradesh	"Kayar hunu bhanda marnu ramro" ("better to die than live like a coward")	"Jai Ma Kali, ayo Gorkhali" ("hail Goddess Kali, here come the Gorkhas")
3rd Gorkha Rifles	1815	Varanasi Cantonment, Uttar Pradesh	"Kayar hunu bhanda marnu ramro" ("better to die than live like a coward")	"Jai Ma Kali, ayo Gorkhali" ("hail Goddess Kali, here come the Gorkhas")
4th Gorkha Rifles	1857	Sabathu, Himachal Pradesh	"Kayar hunu bhanda marnu ramro" ("better to die than live like a coward")	"Jai Ma Kali, ayo Gorkhali" ("hail Goddess Kali, here come the Gorkhas")
5th Gorkha Rifles (Frontier Force)	1858	Shillong Cantonment, Meghalaya	"Shaurya evam nishtha" ("courage and determination")	"Jai Ma Kali, ayo Gorkhali" ("hail Goddess Kali, here come the Gorkhas")
8th Gorkha Rifles	1824	Shillong Cantonment, Meghalaya	"Kayar hunu bhanda marnu ramro" ("better to die than live like a coward")	"Jai Ma Kali, ayo Gorkhali" ("hail Goddess Kali, here come the Gorkhas")
9th Gorkha Rifles	1817	Varanasi Cantonment, Uttar Pradesh	"Kayar hunu bhanda marnu ramro" ("better to die than live like a coward")	"Jai Ma Kali, ayo Gorkhali" ("hail Goddess Kali, here come the Gorkhas")
11th Gorkha Rifles	1918-1922; from 1948	Lucknow, Uttar Pradesh	"Yatraham vijayastatra" ("victory resides where I reside")	"Jai Ma Kali, ayo Gorkhali" ("hail Goddess Kali, here come the Gorkhas")
Ladakh Scouts	1963	Leh, Ladakh		"Ki ki so so lhargyalo" ("victory to God")
Arunachal Scouts	2010	Pasighat, Arunachal Pradesh		
Sikkim Scouts	2013	Lucknow, Uttar Pradesh		

=== Mechanised ===
Regiment	Active from	Regimental centre	Motto	War cry
Brigade of the Guards	1949	Kamptee, Maharashtra	"Pehla hamesha pehla ("first always first")	"Garud ka hun bol pyare" ("I am the son of Garuda, say my friend")
Mechanised Infantry Regiment	1979	Ahmednagar, Maharashtra	"Valour and faith"	"Bolo Bharat Mata ki jai" ("say victory to Mother India")

=== Corps of Army Air Defence ===
The list of army air defence regiments is as follows:

- 19 AD Regiment
- 25 AD Regiment
- 26 AD Regiment
- 27 AD Missile Regiment (Amritsar Airfield) (Akash SAM)
- 28 AD Regiment
- 29 AD Regiment (Samba)
- 45 AD Regiment (Basantar River)
- 46 AD Regiment
- 47 AD Regiment
- 48 AD Regiment
- 49 AD Regiment
- 50 Light AD Regiment (Composite)
- 103 AD Regiment
- 104 AD Regiment
- 105 AD Regiment
- 107 AD Regiment
- 109 Light AD Regiment (Self Propelled)
- 126 Light AD Regiment (Composite)
- 127 Light AD Regiment (Composite)
- 128 AD Missile Regiment (Akash SAM)
- 129 AD Regiment
- 130 AD Regiment
- 131 AD Regiment
- 140 AD Regiment (Self Propelled)
- 142 AD Regiment (Self Propelled)
- 144 AD Regiment (Self Propelled)
- 145 Light AD Regiment (Self Propelled)
- 146 Light AD Regiment (Self Propelled)
- 147 Light AD Regiment (Composite)
- 148 Light AD Regiment
- 151 AD Regiment (Self Propelled) (Chhamb)
- 152 AD Regiment
- 156 Light AD Missile Regiment (Self propelled)
- 157 Light AD Regiment (Composite)
- 322 AD Regiment
- 323 AD Regiment
- 325 Light AD Regiment (Composite)
- 326 Light AD Regiment
- 401 Light AD Regiment (Composite)
- 402 Light AD Regiment (Composite)
- 403 Light AD Regiment (Composite)
- 404 Light AD Regiment (Composite)
- 405 Light AD Regiment (Self Propelled)
- 406 Gun Missile AD Regiment
- 407 Gun Missile AD Regiment
- 408 Gun Missile AD Regiment
- 436 AD Missile Regiment (Self Propelled)
- 501 AD Group (Self Propelled) (SA-6)
- 502 AD Group (Self Propelled) (SA-6)
- 503 AD Missile Regiment (MR-SAM)
- 510 Light AD Missile Regiment (Self Propelled)
- 511 AD Missile Regiment (Self Propelled) (Composite)
- 512 Light AD Missile Regiment (Self Propelled)
- 513 AD Missile Regiment (Self Propelled)
- 514 AD Regiment (Self Propelled)
- 912 Light AD Regiment
- 916 Light AD Regiment (Composite)
- 947 Light AD Regiment
- 707 Target Support Unit
- 708 Target Support Unit
- 252 (Parachute) AD Battery

=== Corps of Engineers ===
The corps was formed from the Sapper and Miner Groups of each of the erstwhile presidencies of British India. The Corps consists of three groups of combat engineers, namely the Madras Sappers, the Bengal Sappers and the Bombay Sappers. The list of Engineer regiments is as follows:

- 1 Armoured Engineer Regiment
- 2 Engineer Regiment
- 3 Engineer Regiment
- 4 Engineer Regiment
- 5 Engineer Regiment
- 6 Engineer Regiment
- 7 Engineer Regiment
- 8 Engineer Regiment
- 9 Rapid (Strike) Engineer Regiment
- 10 Engineer Regiment
- 11 Engineer Regiment
- 12 Engineer Regiment
- 13 Engineer Regiment
- 14 Engineer Regiment
- 15 Engineer Regiment
- 16 Engineer Bridge Regiment
- 17 Engineer Regiment
- 18 Engineer Regiment
- 19 Engineer Regiment
- 20 Engineer Regiment
- 21 Engineer Regiment
- 22 Engineer Regiment
- 38 Assault Engineer Regiment
- 51 Engineer Regiment
- 52 Engineer Regiment
- 53 Engineer Regiment
- 54 Engineer Regiment
- 55 Engineer Regiment
- 56 Rapid (Strike) Engineer Regiment
- 57 Engineer Regiment
- 58 Engineer Regiment
- 59 Engineer Regiment
- 60 Engineer Regiment
- 61 Engineer Regiment
- 62 Engineer Regiment
- 63 Engineer Regiment
- 64 Assault Engineer Regiment
- 65 Engineer Bridge Regiment
- 66 Engineer Regiment
- 67 Engineer Bridge Regiment
- 68 Engineer Regiment
- 69 Engineer Regiment
- 70 Engineer Regiment
- 71 Engineer Regiment
- 101 Engineer Regiment
- 102 Engineer Regiment
- 103 Engineer Regiment
- 104 Engineer Regiment
- 105 Engineer Regiment
- 106 Engineer Regiment
- 107 Engineer Regiment
- 108 Engineer Regiment
- 109 Rapid (Strike) Engineer Regiment
- 110 Engineer Regiment
- 111 Engineer Regiment
- 112 Engineer Regiment
- 113 Engineer Regiment
- 114 Armoured Engineer Regiment
- 115 Engineer Regiment
- 116 Engineer Regiment
- 117 Engineer Regiment
- 118 Engineer Regiment
- 119 Assault Engineer Regiment
- 120 Engineer Regiment
- 121 Engineer Regiment
- 122 Engineer Regiment
- 201 Engineer Regiment
- 202 Engineer Regiment
- 203 Engineer Regiment
- 234 Armoured Engineer Regiment
- 235 Engineer Regiment
- 236 Engineer Regiment
- 237 Engineer Regiment
- 267 Engineer Regiment
- 268 Engineer Bridge Regiment
- 269 Engineer Regiment
- 270 Engineer Regiment
- 652 Engineer Regiment
- 411 (I) Para Field Company
- 412 (I) Engineer Squadron
- 414 (I) Engineer Squadron
- 418 (I) Field Company
- 419 Assault Engineer Squadron

=== Army Aviation Corps ===
The Army Aviation Corps units are designated as 'Squadrons'. Each squadron generally consists of two Reconnaissance (Recce) and Observation Flights. R & O Flights might be part of squadrons or operate independently and do not have a parent squadron (designated by an (I) in their name). The suffix 'UH' stands for Utility Helicopter Flights and 'ALH-WSI' stands for Advanced Light Helicopter - Weapon Systems Integrated.

Squadrons

- 201 Army Aviation Squadron (UH)
- 202 Army Aviation Squadron (UH)
- 203 Army Aviation Squadron (UH)
- 204 Army Aviation Squadron (UH)
- 205 Army Aviation Squadron (UH)
- 206 Army Aviation Squadron (UH)
- 207 Army Aviation Squadron (UH)
- 209 Army Aviation Squadron (UH)
- 251 Army Aviation Squadron (ALH-WSI)
- 252 Army Aviation Squadron (ALH-WSI)
- 253 Army Aviation Squadron
- 254 Army Aviation Squadron (ALH-WSI)
- 257 Army Aviation Squadron (ALH-WSI)
- 301 Army Aviation Squadron (Spec Ops)
- 351 Army Aviation Squadron (LCH)
- 451 Army Aviation Squadron (AH-64E)
- 659 Army Aviation Squadron
- 660 Army Aviation Squadron
- 661 Army Aviation Squadron
- 662 Army Aviation Squadron
- 663 Army Aviation Squadron
- 664 Army Aviation Squadron
- 665 Army Aviation Squadron
- 666 Army Aviation Squadron
- 667 Army Aviation Squadron
- 668 Army Aviation Squadron
- 669 Army Aviation Squadron
- 670 Army Aviation Squadron
- 671 Army Aviation Squadron

Flights

- 1 (I) R&O Flight
- 2 R&O Flight
- 3 R&O Flight
- 4 R&O Flight
- 5 R&O Flight
- 6 R&O Flight
- 7 R&O Flight
- 8 R&O Flight
- 9 R&O Flight
- 10 R&O Flight
- 11 R&O Flight
- 12 (I) R&O Flight
- 13 R&O Flight
- 14 R&O Flight
- 15 R&O Flight
- 16 R&O Flight
- 17 R&O Flight
- 18 R&O Flight
- 19 R&O Flight
- 20 R&O Flight
- 21 R&O Flight
- 22 (I) R&O Flight
- 23 (I) R&O Flight
- 24 R&O Flight
- 25 R&O Flight
- 26 R&O Flight
- 27 (I) R&O Flight
- 28 R&O Flight
- 29 R&O Flight
- 30 (I) R&O Flight
- 31 R&O Flight
- 32 R&O Flight
- 33 R&O Flight
- 34 R&O Flight
- 35 R&O Flight
- 58 RPA Flight
- 37 (I) R&O Flight
- 38 (I) R&O Flight
- 39 (I) R&O Flight
- 40 (I) R&O Flight
- 1 (I) UH Flight
- 2 (I) UH Flight
- 2011 UH Flight
- 2012 UH Flight
- 2021 UH Flight
- 2022 UH Flight
- 2031 UH Flight
- 2032 UH Flight
- 2041 UH Flight
- 2042 UH Flight
- 2051 UH Flight
- 2052 UH Flight
- 2061 UH Flight
- 2062 UH Flight
- 2071 UH Flight
- 2072 UH Flight
- 2511 ALH-WSI Flight
- 2512 ALH-WSI Flight
- 2521 ALH-WSI Flight
- 2522 ALH-WSI Flight
- 2571 ALH-WSI Flight
- 2572 ALH-WSI Flight

== See also ==
- Military of India
- Paramilitary forces of India
- Women in Indian Armed Forces
