= 165 Medium Regiment (India) =

- Active: 1963 – present
- Country: India
- Allegiance: India
- Branch: Indian Army
- Type: Artillery
- Size: Regiment
- Mottos: Sarvatra, Izzat-O-Iqbal (Everywhere with Honour and Glory)
- Colors: Red & Navy Blue
- Anniversaries: 1 October – Raising Day

Insignia
- Abbreviation: 165 Med Regt

165 Medium Regiment is part of the Regiment of Artillery of the Indian Army.

== Formation and history ==
The regiment was raised as 165 Field Regiment on 1 October 1963 at Ferozepur fort. The first commanding officer was Lieutenant Colonel PR Saranjame. The unit was constituted from the Sierra batteries of 10 and 16 Field Regiments. The third battery was raised from within the regiment. The troop composition was single class with Brahmin soldiers.

== Operations ==
The regiment has taken part in the following operations –

- Indo-Pakistani War of 1965 – The newly formed regiment had barely finished its initial training, when it was thrown in the throngs of battle. Under Lieutenant Colonel PR Saranjame, it was deployed in the Jalalabad sector on 6 December 1965 under 7 Artillery Brigade of 7 Infantry Division. Equipped with 25-pounder guns, the unit performed gallantly during the army's counter offensive against Pakistani attacks. It kept firing bravely even when its positions at Khalra and Hussainiwala were attacked. The regiment provided fire cover during the final attack on Ichogil Canal and also during the Battle of Burki. Major HS Sarao was awarded the Sena Medal and Captain MR Dineshan was mentioned in dispatches. Following its action during the Battle of Burki, Romeo (R) battery was renamed Burki battery.
- Indo-Pakistani War of 1971 – the regiment was commanded by Lieutenant Colonel GS Dhody and took part in Operation Cactus Lily in the Jalalabad- Fazilka sector on the Western front. The regiment lost Second Lieutenant Viney Kaul, who was the Forward Observation Officer with an infantry battalion. Gunner (Operator) Narayan Swaroop was mentioned in dispatches.
- Operation Meghdoot – The regiment was deployed in icy heights the Siachen Glacier in 1990. For its efforts in maintaining the highest gun position in the world, Papa (P) battery of the regiment was renamed Shejra battery.
- Operation Parakram – The regiment under the command of Colonel S Banerjee terrorised the enemy by its relentless firing. For its efforts during this operation, Quebec (Q) battery war renamed Taj battery.

Other operations

- Operation Trident – 1987
- Operation Rakshak – counter-terrorist operations in 1991-1992 and 2000
- Operation Rhino – counter-terrorist operations in Assam – 1997–1998
- Operation Vijay – 1999
- Operation Snow Leapord - 2025

== Notable Officers ==
- General Sunith Francis Rodrigues PVSM, VSM – fourth commanding officer of the regiment, later Chief of the Army Staff and Governor of Punjab and Administrator of the Union Territory of Chandigarh.
- Major General VK Chaudhari
- Major General JS Kundu VSM

== Other achievements ==
- GOC-in-C (Eastern Command) Unit Citation – for its efforts in establishing a gun position at 14,000 feet.
- GOC-in-C (Northern Command) Unit Citation - for outstanding work done in high altitude area at 18,000 Feet.

== See also ==
- List of artillery regiments of Indian Army
