= 78 Field Regiment (India) =

Indian Army artillery unit

- Active: 1966 – present
- Country: India
- Allegiance: India
- Branch: Indian Army
- Type: Artillery
- Size: Regiment
- Nickname(s): 78 Very Fine
- Motto(s): Sarvatra, Izzat-O-Iqbal (Everywhere with Honour and Glory) सबसे बेहतर अठहत्तर (Sabse Behtar Aṭhhattar)
- Colors: Red & Navy Blue
- Anniversaries: 1 July – Raising Day
- Equipment: 122 mm D-30 Howitzer

Insignia
- Abbreviation: 78 Fd Regt

78 Field Regiment is part of the Regiment of Artillery of the Indian Army.

== Formation ==
The regiment was raised on 1 July 1966 as 78 Medium Regiment at Delhi Cantonment. The first commanding officer was Lieutenant Colonel (later Major General) Nemi Chand Khanna. It was the fourth unit of the Indian artillery to be equipped with the Soviet 130 mm towed guns.

== Composition ==
The regiment is a single class unit with men enlisted from the Ahir community.

== Equipment ==
The regiment has been equipped with the following guns -

Year	Type	Gun
1966 - 1987	Medium artillery	130 mm M-46 towed gun
1987 - 1989	Field artillery	105 mm Indian field gun
1989 - 2012	Medium artillery	130 mm M-46 towed gun
2012 - 2016	Field artillery	105 mm Indian light field gun
2016 - date	Field artillery	122 mm D-30 howitzer

== Operations ==
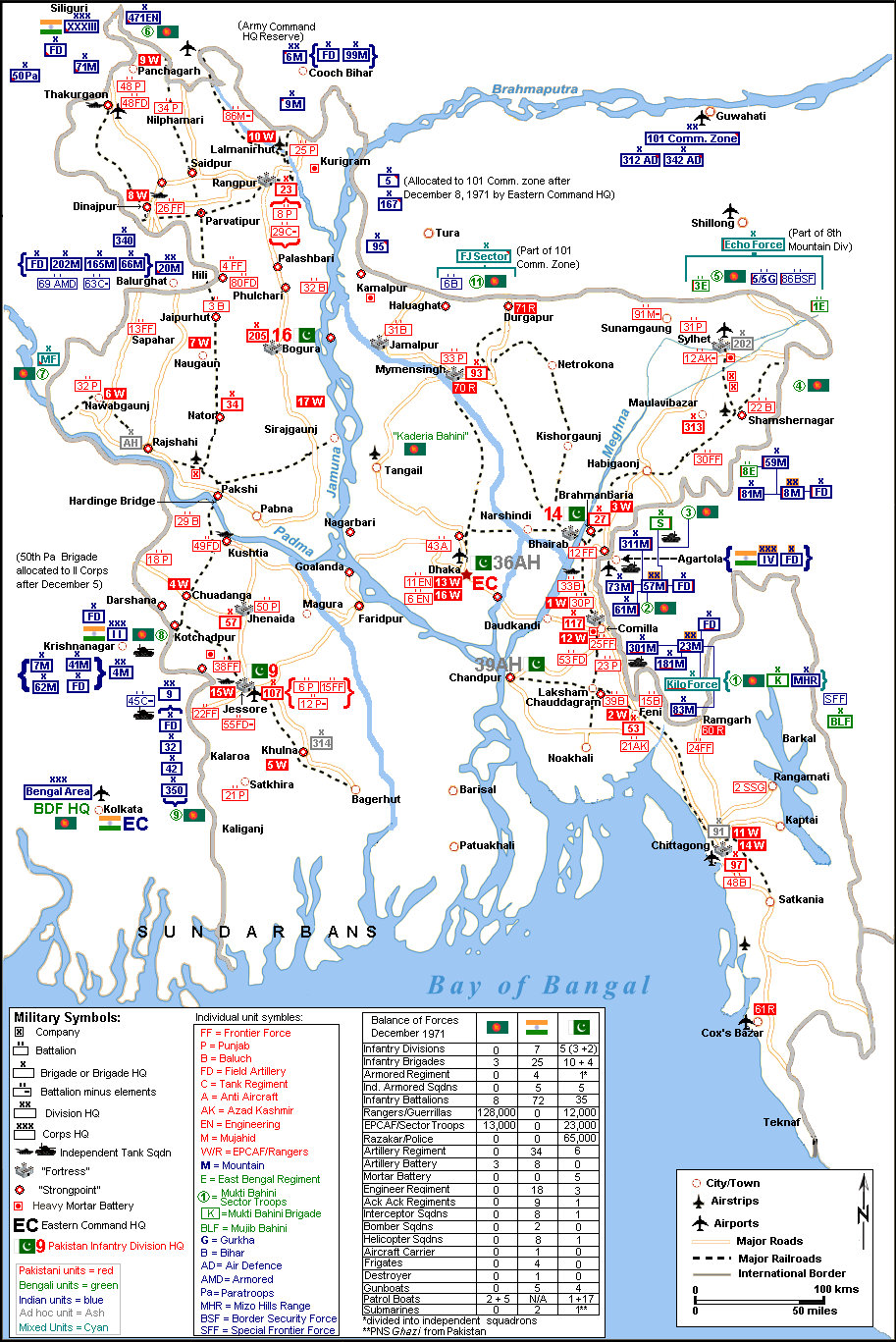
Deployment of troops in the eastern sector during the 1971 war

The regiment has taken part in the following operations –

- Indo-Pakistani War of 1971 – The regiment fought in the South Western sector during the liberation of Bangladesh. It was the only artillery regiment in the eastern sector equipped with 130 mm guns.
  The regiment was part of 9 Artillery Brigade under 9 Infantry Division. One battery (783 Medium Battery) was with 4 Mountain Artillery Brigade under 4 Mountain Division.
  The unit fought in the battles in Garibpur, Jessore and Khulna. It fired a total of 2200 rounds during the war. 783 Medium Battery took part in action in the Jhenida-Kushtia area.
- Operation Blue Star - 1984
- Operation Meghdoot – The regiment was posted for a high altitude tenure in Siachen Glacier in 1989.
- Operation Ibex - 1989 – The regiment under the command of Colonel P Krishna Kumar took part in the operations to seize the Pakistani posts overlooking the Chumik Glacier as part of Operation Ibex. The unit fired 676 rounds during the operations. Captain Rajendra Singh was awarded the Sena Medal for gallantry.
- Operation Rakshak – 1995 to 1999
- Operation Parakram – 2001 to 2002
- Operation Rakshak III - 2004 to 2008

== Honours and achievements ==
The regiment has been awarded the following awards –

- Sena Medal – 3
- Mentioned in despatches – 2
- COAS Commendation Cards – 13
- Vice COAS Commendation Cards – 1
- GOC-in-C Commendation Cards – 25
- The regiment was awarded the COAS Unit Citation in 2022.

== Motto ==
The motto of the regiment is सबसे बेहतर अठहत्तर (Sabse Behtar Aṭhhattar), which translates to Seventy Eight – the best.

== See also ==
- List of artillery regiments of Indian Army
