= 110 Medium Regiment (India) =

Indian Army artillery unit

- Active: 1981–present
- Country: India
- Allegiance: India
- Branch: Indian Army
- Type: Artillery
- Size: Regiment
- Nickname(s): Double One Zero; Pulverisers
- Motto(s): Sarvatra, Izzat-O-Iqbal (Everywhere with Honour and Glory)
- Colors: Red & Navy Blue
- Anniversaries: 1 January – Raising Day
- Equipment: 155 mm Haubits FH77/B Howitzer

Insignia
- Abbreviation: 110 Med Regt

110 Medium Regiment is part of the Regiment of Artillery of the Indian Army.

== Formation and history ==
The regiment was raised at Allahabad on 1 January 1981 with 130 mm guns. The first commanding officer was Lieutenant Colonel (later Colonel) APS Grewal. The regiment was initially attached to an infantry division in Central India, following which it has served as part of an infantry division, an independent artillery brigade, an armoured division and a mountain division. The regiment has also taken part in counter-insurgency duties at different locations.

== Equipment ==
The regiment has had the following guns in chronological order:

- M-46 130 mm Field Gun
- 5.5-inch medium gun
- 155 mm Haubits FH77/B Howitzer

== Operations ==
The regiment has taken part in the following operations:

- Operation Rakshak II (counter terrorism operations)
- Operation Rhino (counter terrorism operations in Assam)
- Operation Vijay
- Operation Parakram
- Operation Rakshak (counter terrorism operations)

== Gallantry awards ==
The regiment has won the following gallantry awards:

- Sena Medal – Major Jasprit Singh Gujral, Captain Amitabh Singh, Naik Bijoy Chutia (Operation Rhino)
- Chief of Army Staff Commendation cards – Subedar Raj Kumar, Naik Sarveshwar Rai (Operation Rhino), Subedar Jay Prakash Tiwari
- Vice Chief of Army Staff Commendation Card – Naik Anil Kumar
- General Officer in Command Commendation card – Subedar Baksheesh Singh (Operation Rakshak II)

== See also ==
- List of artillery regiments of Indian Army
