= 1822 Light Regiment (India) =

Indian military unit

1882 Light Regiment
- Active: 1965 – present
- Country: India
- Allegiance: India
- Branch: Indian Army
- Type: Artillery
- Size: Regiment
- Nickname(s): Silencers
- Motto(s): Sarvatra, Izzat-O-Iqbal (Everywhere with Honour and Glory)
- Colors: Red & Navy Blue
- Anniversaries: 15 September – Raising Day

Insignia
- Abbreviation: 1882 Lt Regt

1882 Light Regiment is part of the Regiment of Artillery of the Indian Army.

== Formation and history ==
The regiment shares a common history with 1821 Light Regiment. The unit was raised at Siliguri as 182 (Independent) Light Regiment (Pack) on 15 September 1965. The first Commanding Officer was Lieutenant Colonel E D Alexander. During the Nathu La operations in 1967, 182 Light Regiment provided timely and effective fire support to silence the Chinese, thus getting the nickname ‘Silencers’.

In 1972, the mules were taken off and the regiment was motorised. The regiment was re-designated 182 Light Regiment (Towed) on 10 June 1972.

In 1973, all light regiments of the army were re-organised. 182 Light Regiment was split into two – 1821 (Independent) Light Battery, which had the headquarters and ‘P’ battery, and 1822 (Independent) Light Battery, which had the ‘Q’ and ‘R’ batteries. The process of bifurcation was completed on 15 May 1973. The unit was re-designated as 1822 Light Regiment on 17 August 1984.

== Operations ==
The regiment has taken part in the following operations -

- Operation Savage – 1966
- Nathu La operations – 1967
- Operation Cactus Lily – 1971
- Operation Sunflower – 1973 to 1974
- Operation Trident – 1987
- Operation Meghdoot – 1989 to 1990
- United Nations Operation in Somalia II (UNOSOM II) – 1993 to 1994
- Operation Vijay – 1999
- Operation Rakshak – 1994 to 1996 and 2006 to 2009
- Operation Hifazat II – 2000 to 2003
- Operation Rhino and Operation Falcon – 2012

== Gallantry awards ==
The regiment has won the following gallantry awards–

- Sena Medal – 2
- Mentioned in dispatches – 1
- Chief of Army Staff Commendation cards - 7
- Vice Chief of Army Staff Commendation cards - 1
- General Officer Commanding-in-chief Commendation cards – 18

== Motto ==
The motto of the regiment is ‘In time and on target, always and everytime’.

== See also ==
- List of artillery regiments of Indian Army
