= 72 Field Regiment (India) =

Artillery regiment of the Indian Army

- Active: 1967 – present
- Country: India
- Allegiance: India
- Branch: Indian Army
- Type: Artillery
- Size: Regiment
- Mottos: SARVATRA, IZZAT-O-IQBAL “Everywhere with Honour and Glory”.
- Colors: "Red & Navy Blue"

Insignia
- Abbreviation: 72 Fd Regt

72 Field Regiment is part of the Regiment of Artillery of the Indian Army.

== Formation ==
72 Field Regiment was raised on 01 July 1967 at Belgaum under the command of Lieutenant Colonel NR Pawar.

== Class composition ==
The unit is a ‘Single Class’ regiment composed of Ahir gunners, with the bulk of the troops from Uttar Pradesh, Haryana and Rajasthan.

== Operations ==
The regiment has taken part in the following operations -

- Indo-Pakistani War of 1971: It participated in Operation Cactus Lily and was deployed in ‘Foxtrot’ sector, where it engaged numerous targets in enemy territory effectively. The regiment lost Havildar Prabhu Dayal during the operations.
- Operation Trident : The regiment was mobilised and took part in the operation between 31 January 1987 and 18 March 1987.
- Operation Meghdoot : In 1988, the gunners of the 722 Medium Battery of the regiment were posted in Observation Posts and with guns. It engaged the ‘Heavy Machine Gun Ridge’ with accurate artillery fire.
- Operation Vijay : On 28 June 1999, the regiment was mobilised and deployed in the ‘J’ sector. It reached back to its base location on 31 December 1999.
- Operation Parakram : The regiment was deployed on 19 December 2001 to 27 December 2002. It also took part in Project Sahyog.
- Operation Rhino : The unit was deployed in North Chachar Hills in Assam and took part in counter insurgency operations between 2006 and 2009.
- Operation Hifazat : 721 Field Battery of the regiment was deployed in Manipur’s Bekra sector for counter insurgency operations between 2008 and 2009.
- Operation Rakshak : The regiment during its tenure in Drass took part in anti-terrorist operations.

== Honours and awards ==
The regiment was awarded the General Officer Commanding in Chief (Eastern Command) Unit Citation and Appreciation of the Governor of Assam during Operation Rhino.

It has won the following gallantry awards -

- Sena Medals – Major Sumeet Sharma, Lance Havildar Pawan Kumar
- COAS Commendation Cards – 6

== See also ==
- List of artillery regiments of Indian Army
