= 891 Field Regiment (India) =

Indian Army artillery unit

- Active: 1964 – present
- Country: India
- Allegiance: India
- Branch: Indian Army
- Type: Artillery
- Size: Regiment
- Nickname: God’s own
- Mottos: Sarvatra, Izzat-O-Iqbal (Everywhere with Honour and Glory)
- Colors: Red & Navy Blue
- Anniversaries: 15 April – Raising Day
- Equipment: Light field gun

Insignia
- Abbreviation: 891 Fd Regt

891 Field Regiment is part of the Regiment of Artillery of the Indian Army.

== Formation and history ==
The regiment was raised as 89 Light Regiment (Pack) on 15 April 1964 at Aurangabad with Ahir troops. It was later designated 891 Field Regiment and has also briefly served as a medium regiment.

== Equipment ==
The regiment has been equipped with the following guns-

- 120 mm mortar
- 130 mm medium guns
- Light field gun

== Operations ==
The regiment has taken part in the following operations –

- Indo-Pakistani War of 1971
- Operation Blue Star, 1984
- Operation Meghdoot, 1986
- Operation Trident, 1987
- Operation Rakshak, 1990
- Operation Parakram, 2002
- Operation Deevar, 2004
- Operation Rakshak, 2006

== War Cry ==
The war cry of the regiment is बोल श्री कृष्ण भगवान की जय (Bol Shree Krishna Bhagwan Ki Jai), which translates to Victory to Lord Krishna.

== Gallantry awards ==
The regiment has won the following gallantry awards –

- Sena Medal (SM) – 3 (Lance Naik Devendra Singh)
- Chief of Army Staff Commendation cards – 5
- Vice Chief of Army Staff Commendation cards – 3 (Colonel Saurabh K Sharma, Subedar Major Chandeshwar Prasad Singh, Major Ravi Prakash Pandey.)
- General Officer Commanding-in-chief Commendation cards – 7

== Other achievements ==
The regiment was awarded the General Officer Commanding in Chief (Northern Command) unit citation in 2014. It was awarded General Officer Commanding in Chief (Eastern Command) Unit Citation in 2025.

== See also ==
- List of artillery regiments of Indian Army
