= 195 Field Regiment (India) =

Indian Army artillery unit

- Active: 1965 – present
- Country: India
- Allegiance: India
- Branch: Indian Army
- Type: Artillery
- Size: Regiment
- Mottos: Sarvatra, Izzat-O-Iqbal (Everywhere with Honour and Glory).
- Colors: Red & Navy Blue
- Anniversaries: 15 February – Raising Day
- Battle honours: Banwat

Insignia
- Abbreviation: 195 Fd Regt

195 Field Regiment (Banwat) is part of the Regiment of Artillery of the Indian Army.

== Formation ==
The regiment was raised on 15 February 1965 at Bangalore as 195 Mountain Regiment. The regiment was subsequently converted to a field regiment and then to a medium regiment and is presently a field regiment.

== Class composition ==
The regiment was raised as a pure South Indian Class regiment.

== Operations ==
The regiment has taken part in the following operations –

Indo-Pakistani War of 1971

The regiment commanded by Lieutenant Colonel Satjit Singh, was part of the 25 Artillery Brigade and was equipped with 75/24 Pack Howitzers. It was deployed in the Poonch Sector in Jammu and Kashmir, primarily in support of 93 Infantry Brigade. The regiment fired around 12,500 rounds in the defensive battle of Poonch between 3 and 7 December, thus fizzling the Pakistani 12 Infantry Division offensive. The regiment played an important part in the capture of Nangi Tekri on 11 December 1971. Captain D Tyagi, the OP officer from the Regiment was part of the daring attack of the gun position at Mandhol by 9 Para (SF) on 13 December.

The regiment earned the ‘honour title’ Banwat and the sobriquet Defenders of Poonch for its gallant actions on 3 and 4 December in the defence of Banwat, which is located north east of Poonch. It won the following gallantry awards –

- Vishisht Seva Medal (VSM) - Lieutenant Colonel Satjit Singh
- Sena Medal – Gunner Rama Murti
- Mentioned in dispatches – Major CM Bhalla, Captain SS Sandhu

Operation Meghdoot

Operation Parakram

The regiment took active part in the operation and its guns saw action against the Pakistani army.

Operation Rakshak

The regiment has taken part in counter insurgency operations in Jammu and Kashmir and has completed four tenures in the state.

== Honours and achievements ==
- Seven of the commanding officers of the regiment have become general officers. They include –
  - Lieutenant General AS Parmar PVSM, who was the Commandant, School of Artillery
  - Lieutenant General MPS Bhandari PVSM, AVSM, ADC, who was also the Director General Artillery
  - Lieutenant General A Natarajan PVSM, AVSM, VSM, who was the Adjutant-General of the Indian Army
  - Major General DS Chimni
  - Major General Kuldip Chandra Vig AVSM, VSM
  - Major General MN Kashid VSM
  - Major General Mohabat Singh
  - Brigadier Satjit Singh VSM
  - Brigadier AJS Behl
  - Brigadier Balwinder Singh
  - Brigadier SN Bhaduri
- The Regiment has the distinction of having five Brigadiers currently serving in the Indian Army.
- Chinna Raju Srither of the regiment is a national level archer and has won numerous medals as part of the men's compound team, including a silver at the 2010 Commonwealth Games, a silver at the Archery World Cup in 2011 and a gold at the Archery World Cup in 2017.
- Havildar Latheesh VS is a national level rower.

== Other gallantry awards ==
- The following were awarded COAS Commendation Cards during Operation Sindoor. -
  - Major Vipin Kumar Yadav
  - Major Shivam Sharma
  - Major Ashok Sharma
  - Naib Subedar S Rama Mohan Reddy

== See also ==
- List of artillery regiments of Indian Army
