= 220 Field Regiment (India) =

- Active: 1968 – present
- Country: India
- Allegiance: India
- Branch: Indian Army
- Type: Artillery
- Size: Regiment
- Mottos: Sarvatra, Izzat-O-Iqbal (Everywhere with Honour and Glory)
- Colors: Red & Navy Blue
- Anniversaries: Raising Day – 1 October

Insignia
- Abbreviation: 220 Fd Regt

220 Field Regiment is part of the Regiment of Artillery of the Indian Army.

== Formation and history ==
The regiment was raised as 220 Medium Regiment on 1 October 1968. The first commanding officer was Lieutenant Colonel (later Major General) Rajendra Prakash. The unit has subsequently been converted to a field regiment. The regiment consists of 2201, 2202 and 2203 field batteries.

== Operations ==
The regiment has taken part in the following operations–

- Indo-Pakistani War of 1971 – 220 Medium Regiment was part of 26 Artillery Brigade under 26 Infantry Division in the Jammu sector. It was equipped with 130 mm guns. 2202 Medium Battery was part of the force which captured Chicken's Neck.
- Operation Meghdoot

== See also ==
- List of artillery regiments of Indian Army
