= 1851 Light Regiment (India) =

Indian Army artillery unit

- Active: 1967 – present
- Country: India
- Allegiance: India
- Branch: Indian Army
- Type: Artillery
- Size: Regiment
- Nickname(s): Cameleers
- Motto(s): SARVATRA, IZZAT-O-IQBAL “Everywhere with Honour and Glory”.
- Colors: "Red & Navy Blue"
- Anniversaries: Raising day – 12 April

Insignia
- Abbreviation: 1851 Lt Regt

1851 Light Regiment is part of the Regiment of Artillery of the Indian Army.

== Formation ==
1851 Light Regiment was raised on 12 April 1967 as 185 Light Regiment (Pack) under 12 Artillery Brigade at Bikaner. The first commanding officer was Lieutenant Colonel Veer Bahadur Singh. The unit was unique in being the only camel pack artillery regiment of the Indian Army and hence was nicknamed as the cameleers. The unit was redesignated as 1851 Light Regiment in 1984.

== Composition ==
The regiment consists of two batteries of Rajputs and one battery of Ahirs.

== Operations ==
The regiment has taken part in the following operations –

- Indo-Pakistani War of 1971 (Operation Cactus Lily) – the unit was deployed in the Jaisalmer sub-sector during the war. It was part of 12 Artillery Brigade under 12 Infantry Division and was equipped with 120 mm Brandt mortars. The regiment took part and provided artillery support in the Battle of Longewala. Captain (later Brigadier) K R Kanwal was mentioned in dispatches. The regiment lost Gunners Dalip Singh and Jage Ram in the war.
- Operation Meghdoot
- Operation Trident
- Operation Rhino
- Operation Vijay
- Operation Rakshak – Gunner Harsit Bhadoriya was posthumously mentioned in dispatches.
- Operation Falcon

== Honours and awards ==
The regiment has won two mentioned in dispatches, and four GOC-in-C Commendation Cards. Subedar Girraj Singh Rajpoot was awarded the Sena Medal in 2025.

== Notable Officers ==
- Lieutenant General Zameer Uddin Shah PVSM, SM, VSM was commissioned into the regiment and rose to become the Deputy Chief of the Army Staff (Planning and Systems).

== See also ==
- List of artillery regiments of Indian Army
