= 224 Medium Regiment (India) =

224 Medium Regiment (Self Propelled)
- Active: 1972 - present
- Country: India
- Allegiance: India
- Branch: Indian Army
- Type: Artillery
- Size: Regiment
- Mottos: Sarvatra, Izzat-O-Iqbal (Everywhere with Honour and Glory); Sarvada Sarva Pratham
- Colors: Red & Navy Blue
- Equipment: K9-Vajra T self-propelled howitzers

Insignia
- Abbreviation: 224 Med Regt (SP)

224 Medium Regiment (Self Propelled) is part of the Regiment of Artillery of the Indian Army.

== Formation ==
224 Medium Regiment was raised on 24 May 1972 as 224 Field Regiment. It is presently equipped with the formidable K9 Vajra-T Self Propelled gun system. It consists of 2241, 2242 and 2243 Medium Batteries.

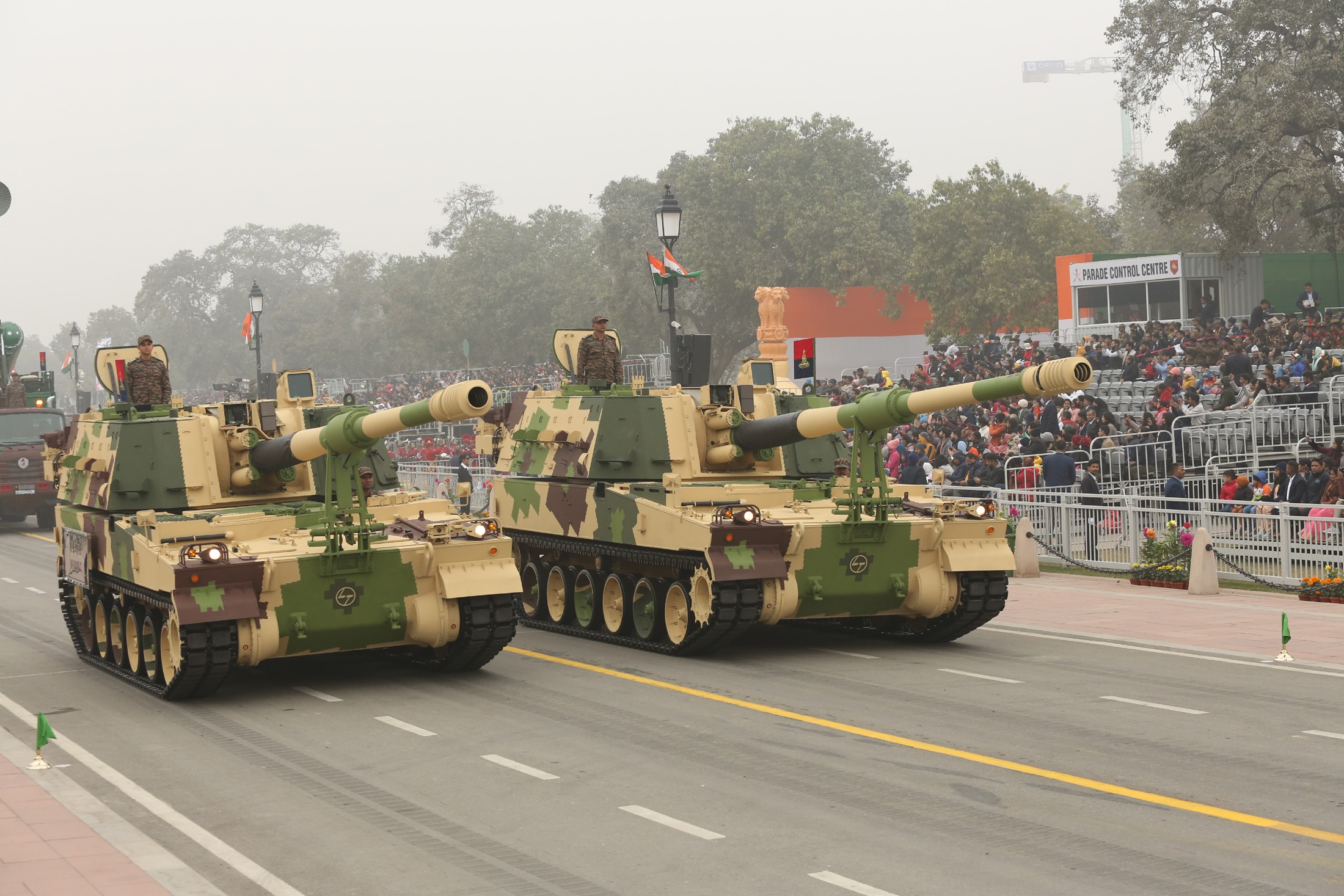
K9-Vajra 155 mm self-propelled howitzers of the regiment during the Republic Day Parade, New Delhi, 2023

== Operations ==
- The regiment has participated in the following operations-
- Operation Trident
- Operation Rakshak
- Operation Meghdoot
- Operation Vijay
- Operation Parakram
- Operation Rhino

== Achievements ==
- The regiment had the honour to participate with its guns in the following -
  - Republic Day Parade in 1984 and 2023.
  - Army Day Parade in 2024.

== Motto ==
The motto of the regiment is सर्वदा सर्व प्रथम (Sarvada Sarva Pratham), which translates to Always the First.

== See also ==
- List of artillery regiments of Indian Army
