= 269 Medium Regiment (India) =

269 Medium Regiment (Self Propelled)
- Active: 1975–present
- Country: India
- Allegiance: India
- Branch: Indian Army
- Type: Artillery
- Size: Regiment
- Nickname(s): Superfine
- Motto(s): Sarvatra, Izzat-O-Iqbal (Everywhere with Honour and Glory)
- Colors: Red & Navy Blue
- Anniversaries: 1 September – Raising Day
- Equipment: K9 Vajra T self-propelled howitzers

Insignia
- Abbreviation: 269 Med Regt (SP)

269 Medium Regiment (Self Propelled) is part of the Regiment of Artillery of the Indian Army.

== Formation ==
The regiment was raised as 269 Field Regiment on 1 September 1975 at Moga, Punjab. Lieutenant Colonel HK Kapoor was the first commanding officer. It is presently a medium regiment equipped with K9-Vajra T howitzers. It consists of 2691, 2692 and 2693 medium batteries.

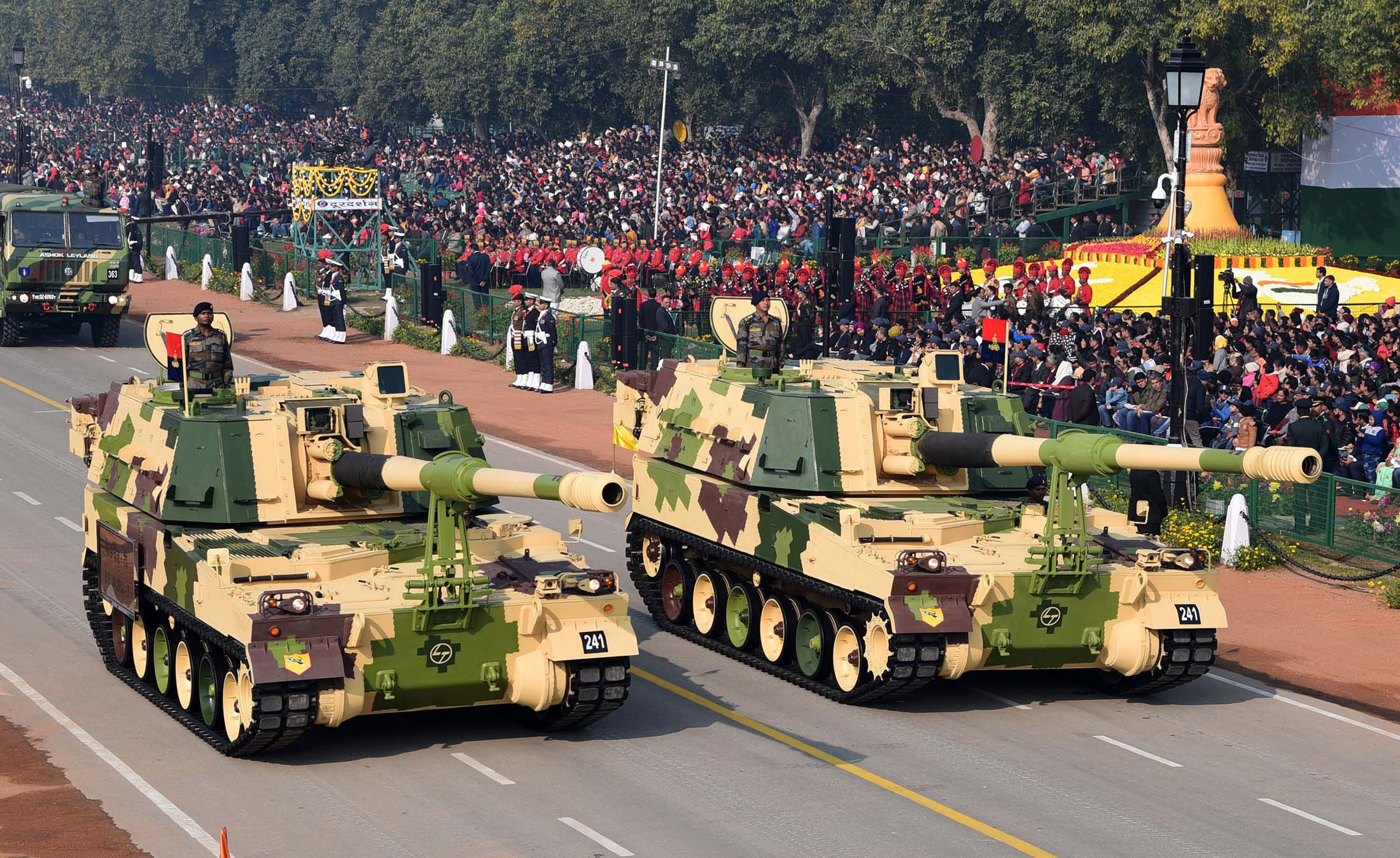
K9 Vajra 155 mm self-propelled howitzers of the regiment during the Republic Day Parade, New Delhi, 2020

== Gallantry awards ==
- Sena Medal – Havildar Devendra Singh
- Sena Medal - Havildar Muthu Kunapa

== Achievements ==
- The regiment had the honour to participate in the Republic Day Parade in 2020 with its K9 Vajra T self-propelled howitzers.
- The regiment has been awarded GOC - in - C Northern Command and GOC - in - C Southern Command Unit Appreciation for exceptional professional performance.
- The regiment was awarded Unit appreciation by the Governor of Uttar Pradesh, Mrs. Anandiben Patel, for outstanding contribution towards civil-military co-operation activities in the state.

== See also ==
- List of artillery regiments of Indian Army
