= 76 Field Regiment (India) =

- Active: 1966 – present
- Country: India
- Allegiance: India
- Branch: Indian Army
- Type: Artillery
- Size: Regiment
- Mottos: Sarvatra, Izzat-O-Iqbal (Everywhere with Honour and Glory)
- Colors: Red & Navy Blue
- Anniversaries: 1 July – Raising Day

Insignia
- Abbreviation: 76 Fd Regt

76 Field Regiment is part of the Regiment of Artillery of the Indian Army.

== Formation and history ==
The regiment was raised on 1 July 1966 at Secunderabad. The first commanding officer was Lieutenant Colonel A Kaul. The regiment consists of 761, 762 and 763 field batteries.

== Class Composition ==
The regiment at formation had a fixed class composition of Ahirs, Rajputs and Sikhs. In 1999, the regiment was converted to a mixed class unit.

== Operations ==
The regiment has taken part in the following operations –

- Operation Cactus Lily – 76 Medium Regiment was part of 7 Artillery Brigade of 7 Infantry Division in the western front. During the war, it was allotted to 21 (Independent) Artillery Brigade. It saw action under 15 Infantry Division. The unit was in support of 86 Infantry Brigade in the battle for Dera Baba Nanak. It then provided fire power to 96 Infantry Brigade during the capture of Burj and Fatehpur. The regiment lost Gunner Balwinder Singh during the war.
- Operation Blue Star – 1984 -1985
- Operation Trident – 1987
- Operation Rakshak – Counter terrorist operations in Jammu and Kashmir between 1992 and 1995 and between 2005 and 2007. The regiment lost Havildar Makhan Singh and Gunner Rakesh Kumar during the operations.
- Operation Parakram – 2001- 2002
- Operation Rhino – Counter terrorist operations in Assam between 2010 and 2013

== Gallantry awards ==
The regiment has won the following gallantry awards–

- Ati Vishisht Seva Medal – 2
- Vishisht Seva Medal – 1
- Sena Medal – 5
  - Gunner Ranjeet Kumar
- Mentioned in dispatches – 3
  - Havildar Chandra Bhan Singh (Operation Rakshak), Havildar Rajkumar M
- Commendation cards – 20

== Other achievements ==
- The regiment was awarded the General Officer Commanding-in-Chief (South Western Command) unit citation on 14 January 2016.
- Naib Subedar (later Subedar Major) Paramjeet Singh of the regiment, while posted to School of Artillery, broke the 33 year old British world record of Gerry Breen in powered hang gliding by covering a distance of 380 km between Sri Ganganagar and Sanderav near Jodhpur. He was awarded the Tenzing Norgay National Adventure Award for the year 2012. Image (External link)
- Mohan Damor from the regiment won the 21 km Half Marathon event during the Ahmedabad Marathon in 2017. He secured the third prize for same event during the Vasai-Virar marathon in 2017.

== See also ==
- List of artillery regiments of Indian Army
