= 133 Medium Regiment (India) =

- Active: 1981–present
- Country: India
- Allegiance: India
- Branch: Indian Army
- Type: Artillery
- Size: Regiment
- Nickname: Wond’ble Three
- Mottos: Sarvatra, Izzat-O-Iqbal (Everywhere with Honour and Glory); Ever courageous, ever victorious
- Colors: Red & Navy Blue
- Anniversaries: 1 February – Raising Day

Insignia
- Abbreviation: 133 Med Regt

133 Medium Regiment is part of the Regiment of Artillery of the Indian Army.

== Formation ==
The regiment was raised as 133 Field Regiment on 1 February 1981. The first commanding officer was Lieutenant Colonel Narendra Singh. It consists of 1331, 1332 and 1333 medium batteries.

== Operations ==
The regiment has taken part in the following operations –

- Operation Rakshak – The unit was deployed in internal security operations between 1990 and 1991.
- Operation Rakshak (J&K) – The unit was deployed in counter terrorist operations in Jammu and Kashmir between 1993 and 1995. Captain Anuj Chanan was the awarded the Chief of the Army Staff Commendation Card during this tenure. The regiment had a second tenure here in 2003.
- Operation Vijay – 1999.
- Operation Meghdoot – Two observation post parties were provided by the regiment for operations in Siachen glacier.
- Operation Parakram – The regiment lost Gunner Baba Dev Samal and Gunner B Gunasekaran during the operations.

== Gallantry awards ==
The regiment has won the following gallantry awards -

- Ati Vishisht Seva Medal – 2
- Shaurya Chakra – 1
- Sena Medal – 1
- Vishisht Seva Medal – 1
- Chief of the Army Staff Commendation Cards – 4
- GOC-in-C Commendation Cards – 6

== Motto ==
The motto of the regiment is सदैव साहसी, सदैव विजयी (Sadaiv sahasi, sadaiv vijayee) which translates to Ever courageous, ever victorious.

== Achievements ==
The regiment has the following achievements to its credit -

- Within four years of its raising, the regiment had the honour of sending one of its field batteries as the demo battery to Army War College, Mhow.
- The regiment took part in the Republic Day parade in 1996 with their 105 mm guns. The regiment was awarded the trophy for the best mounted contingent.
- The regiment also had the honour of carrying the mortal remains of Mother Teresa during her last journey in September 1997.
- Two officers from the regiment went on to become General officers and three became Brigadiers.

== See also ==
- List of artillery regiments of Indian Army
