= 166 Medium Regiment (India) =

Indian Army artillery unit

- Active: 1963 – present
- Country: India
- Allegiance: India
- Branch: Indian Army
- Type: Artillery
- Size: Regiment
- Nickname: One Double Six
- Mottos: SARVATRA, IZZAT-O-IQBAL "Everywhere With Honour and Glory".
- Colors: "Red & Navy Blue"
- Decorations: Ati Vishisht Seva Medal 1 Vir Chakra 2 Shaurya Chakra 1 Vishisht Seva Medal 1 Mention in Despatches 7 COAS Commendation Card 7 GOC-in-C Commendation Card 21; Arjuna Award 1.

Insignia
- Abbreviation: 166 Med Regt

166 Medium Regiment is an artillery regiment which is part of the Regiment of Artillery of the Indian Army.

== Formation ==
The regiment was raised as a 166 Field Regiment on 1 November 1963 at Jalandhar Cantonment. The first commanding officer was Lieutenant Colonel (later Major General) Rajeshwar Singh.

== Class composition ==
The unit is a single class composition regiment composed entirely of Sikh gunners.

== History ==
The regiment was the first unit to be equipped with the Indian Field Gun. It saw action in the Indo-Pakistani War of 1965 and Indo-Pakistani War of 1971. It participated in Operation Parakram (2002) and Operation Meghdoot in 2007.

Nagrota Attack
On 29 November 2016, two officers and five soldiers were killed and half a dozen others wounded in a fierce gun battle with a group of heavily armed militants which stormed the Army camp housing the regiment at Nagrota. Among the martyred was Major Gosavi Kunal Mannadir, who was subsequently awarded the Shaurya Chakra.

== Operations ==
Some of the major operations undertaken by the regiment include:

Indo-Pakistani War of 1965
As 166 Field Regiment, the regiment provided fire power as part of the XI Corps in the Battle of Chawinda and the Battle of Alhar. Lt Col (later Maj Gen) Rajeshwar Singh was awarded the 'COAS Commendation Card’ and 5 gunners were Mentioned in Despatches.

Indo-Pakistani War of 1971
The 166 Field Regiment under "F" Sector took part in the defense of Fazilka. Lt Col Narinder Singh Rawat and Gnr Ajit Singh were awarded the Vir Chakra. Capt RS Sodhi and LNk Prakash Singh were Mentioned in Despatches.

== Achievements ==
Subedar Hardeep Singh was awarded the Arjuna Award in 1992 for Kabaddi, he represented India in the International Kabaddi Tournament in 1984 and 1990, 3rd SAF Games in 1997 and the Asian Games in 1990. His team won Gold in all these events.

== Motto ==
The motto of the regiment is हर मैदान फतेह (Har Maidan Fateh), which translates to Victory in every field.

== See also ==
- List of artillery regiments of Indian Army
