= 64 Field Regiment (India) =

Indian Army artillery unit

- Active: 1962 – present
- Country: India
- Allegiance: India
- Branch: Indian Army
- Type: Artillery
- Size: Regiment
- Motto(s): Sarvatra, Izzat-O-Iqbal (Everywhere with Honour and Glory).
- Colors: Red & Navy Blue

Insignia
- Abbreviation: 64 Fd Regt

64 Field Regiment is part of the Regiment of Artillery of the Indian Army.

== Formation ==
The regiment was raised in Belgaum on 01 Oct 1962 under Lieutenant Colonel Bhag Singh Jaswal as 64 Mountain Regiment.

== Composition ==
The unit is the only pure Gorkha artillery regiment in the Indian Army. Unlike other artillery regiments, the gunners wear the Gorkha hat instead of the navy blue beret.

== Operations ==
The regiment has taken part in the following operations –

- Sino-Indian War: The regiment fought at Bomdila in North-East Frontier Agency.
- Indo-Pakistani War of 1971: The regiment under the command of Lieutenant Colonel Dharam Pall Dhillon participated in the north western sector of erstwhile East Pakistan during the war. It was equipped with 75/24 Pack Howitzers and was under 20 Mountain Artillery Brigade of the 20 Mountain Division. It took part in the battles of Gobindoganj and Bogra.
- Counter insurgency operations in Jammu and Kashmir

== Honours and awards ==
- During the 1971 war, Captain Surjit Singh Parmar of the regiment earned a Vir Chakra. Lieutenant Colonel Dharam Pall Dhillon and Captain Naresh Kumar Srivastava were mentioned in dispatches.
- The regiment was awarded the GOC-in-C (South Western Command) unit citation in 2014.
- COAS Commendation Card

== War cry ==
The war cry of the regiment is “TARAPATA TARAPATA 64” meaning from TARA (Star) in the sky to PATA (pata) bottom of the earth - glory of 64. Its motto is सबै भंदा पहिला, सबै भंदा राम्रो (Hindi = सबसे पहले, सबसे अच्छा) which translates to ‘Always First, Always Best’.

== See also ==
- List of artillery regiments of Indian Army
