= 551 Rocket Regiment (India) =

- Active: 1963 - present
- Country: India
- Allegiance: India
- Branch: Indian Army
- Type: Artillery
- Size: Regiment
- Nicknames: Tornadoes; First of Smerch
- Mottos: Sarvatra, Izzat-O-Iqbal (Everywhere with Honour and Glory)
- Colors: Red & Navy Blue
- Anniversaries: 28 September – raising day
- Equipment: BM-30 Smerch

Insignia
- Abbreviation: 551 Rkt Regt

The 551 Rocket Regiment is part of the Regiment of Artillery of the Indian Army.

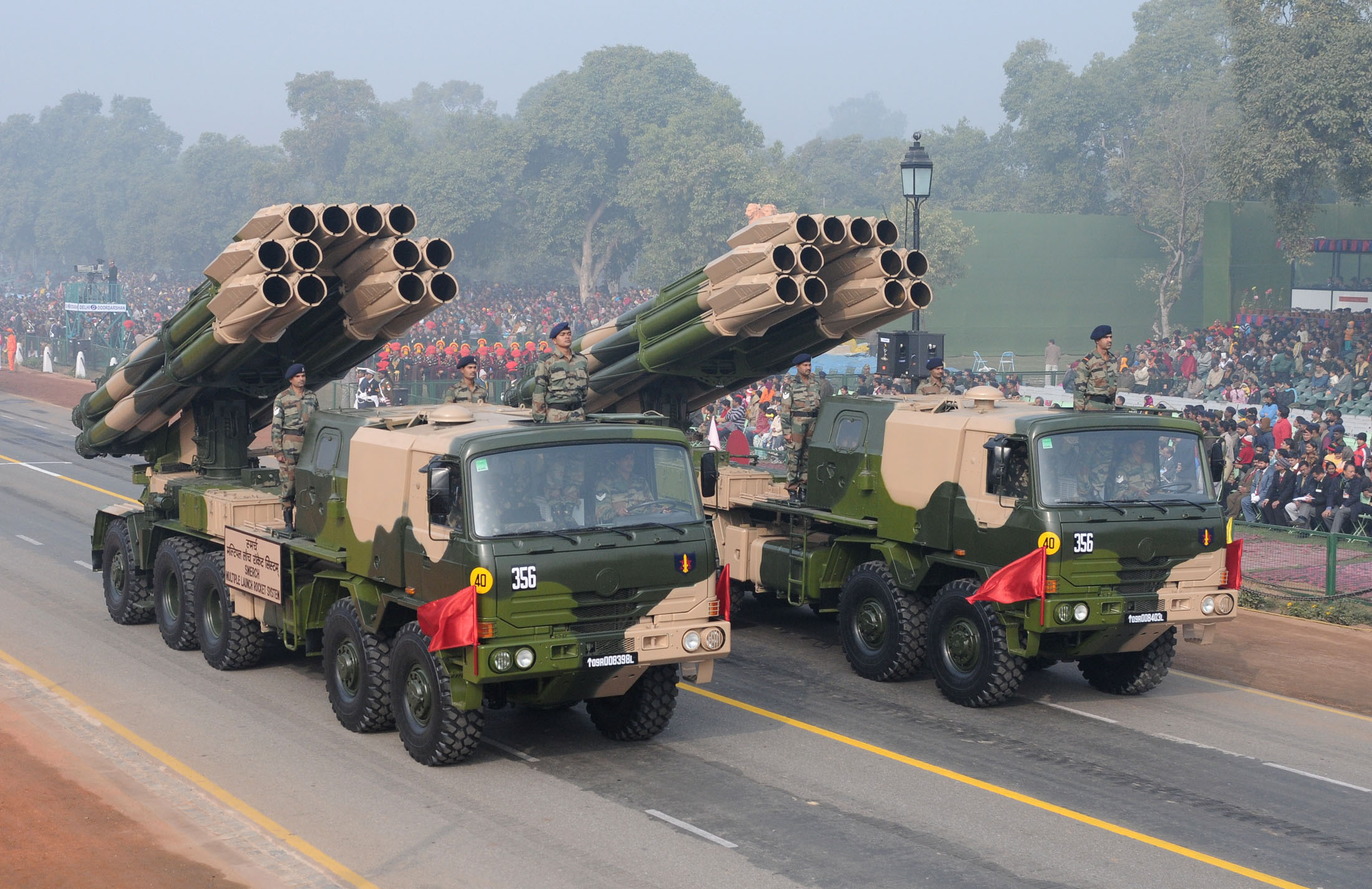
Smerch Rocket System of the regiment during the rehearsal of Republic Day Parade 2010

== Formation ==
The regiment was raised at Ranchi on 28 September 1963 with Ahir troops. The unit became the first unit in the Indian Army to be converted to a Smerch weapon system unit on 9 July 2007 under the command of Colonel Rajesh Srivastava.

== Achievements ==
- The regiment had the honour to participate in the Republic Day Parade in 2008 and 2010.
- The regiment was awarded the General Officer Commanding in Chief (Western Command) unit citation in 2013.
- The regiment was awarded the General Officer Commanding in Chief (South Western Command) unit citation in 2016.

== See also ==
- List of artillery regiments of Indian Army
