= 153 Medium Regiment (India) =

153 Medium Regiment (Self-Propelled)
- Active: 1985 – present
- Country: India
- Allegiance: India
- Branch: Indian Army
- Type: Artillery
- Size: Regiment
- Nickname(s): Long Rangers
- Motto(s): Sarvatra, Izzat-O-Iqbal (Everywhere with Honour and Glory); Shreshthta ke liye sangharsh
- Colors: Red & Navy Blue
- Anniversaries: 7 January – Raising Day

Insignia
- Abbreviation: 153 Med Regt (SP)

153 Medium Regiment (Self-Propelled) is part of the Regiment of Artillery of the Indian Army.

== Formation ==
The regiment was raised on 7 January 1985 at Jhansi in Uttar Pradesh. It consists of 1531, 1532 and 1533 medium batteries. The regiment is a mixed class troops regiment.

== Operations ==
The regiment has taken part in the following operations –

- Operation Trident
- Operation Vijay – The regiment took part in the Kargil war under the command of Colonel NP Rarilal. It saw action in the Kaksar and Batalik sub sectors with its Bofors guns. The Apati War Memorial in Kargil commemorates the soldiers from the unit, who lost their lives during this operation.

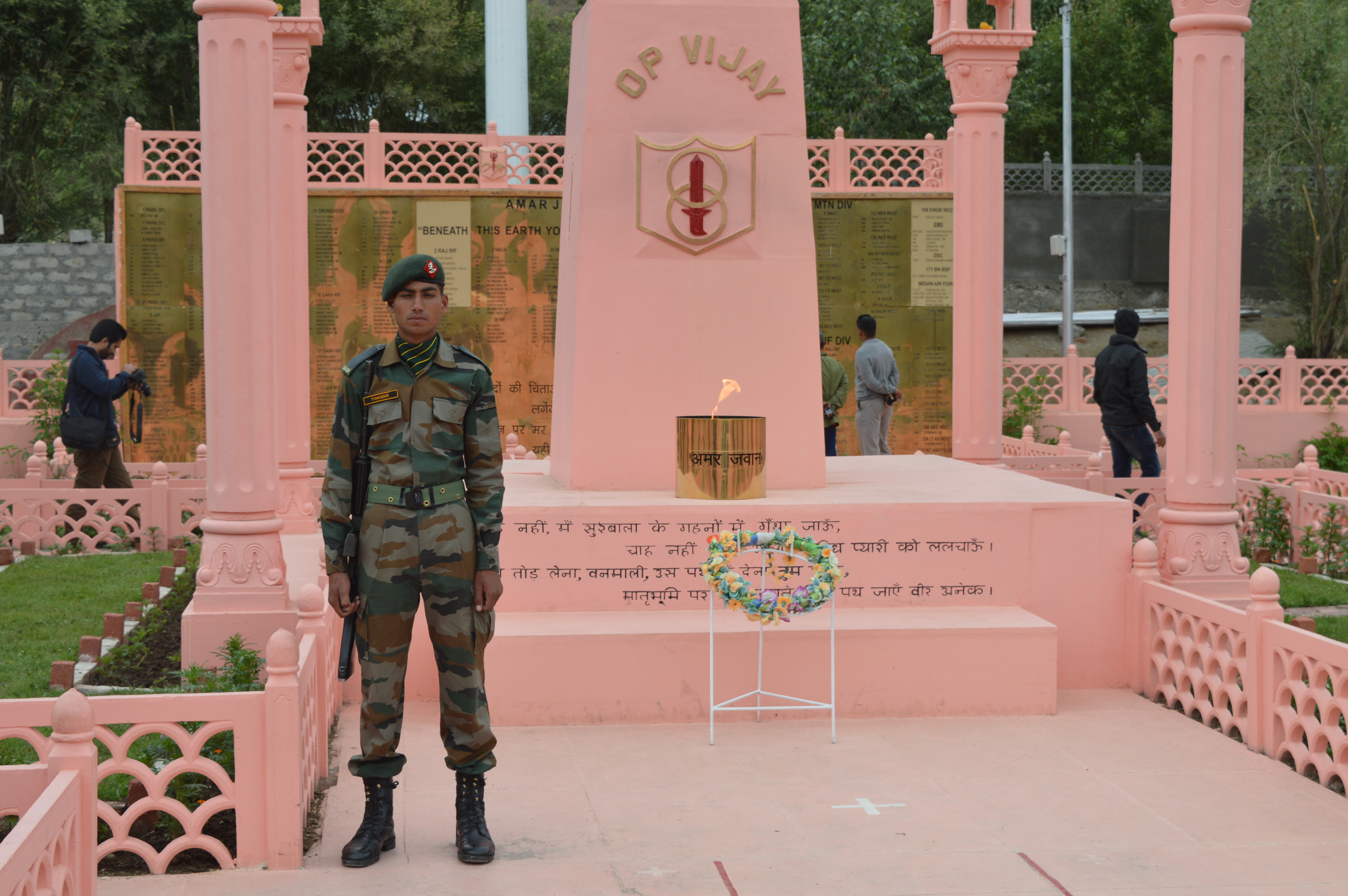
Kargil War Memorial with the name of the martyrs from the regiment

- Operation Rhino – Counter terrorist operations in Assam.
- Operation Falcon
- Operation Bajrang
- Operation Rakshak – The unit was deployed in counter terrorist operations in Jammu and Kashmir.
- Operation Meghdoot – Operations in Siachen glacier.
- Operation Parakram

== Gallantry awards ==
The regiment has won the following gallantry awards -

- Sena Medal – Subedar Balbir Singh (posthumous)

== Motto ==
The motto of the regiment is श्रेष्ठता के लिए संघर्ष (Shreshthta ke liye sangharsh) which translates to Struggle for superiority.

== See also ==
- List of artillery regiments of Indian Army
