= 1812 Rocket Regiment (India) =

Artillery Regiment of the Indian Army

1812 Rocket Regiment (SMERCH)
- Active: 1965 – present
- Country: India
- Allegiance: India
- Branch: Indian Army
- Type: Artillery
- Size: Regiment
- Mottos: SARVATRA, IZZAT-O-IQBAL “Everywhere With Honour and Glory”. “Nulli Secundus”
- Colors: "Red & Navy Blue"
- Decorations: Vir Chakra 1

Commanders
- Notable commanders: General Sundararajan Padmanabhan

1812 Rocket Regiment is an artillery regiment which is part of the Regiment of Artillery of the Indian Army.

== Formation ==
1812 Rocket Regiment (SMERCH) was raised on 15 March 1965 as 181 Light Battery at Khoja Toll, Ranchi Cantt under the stewardship of Major P Banerji.

== History ==
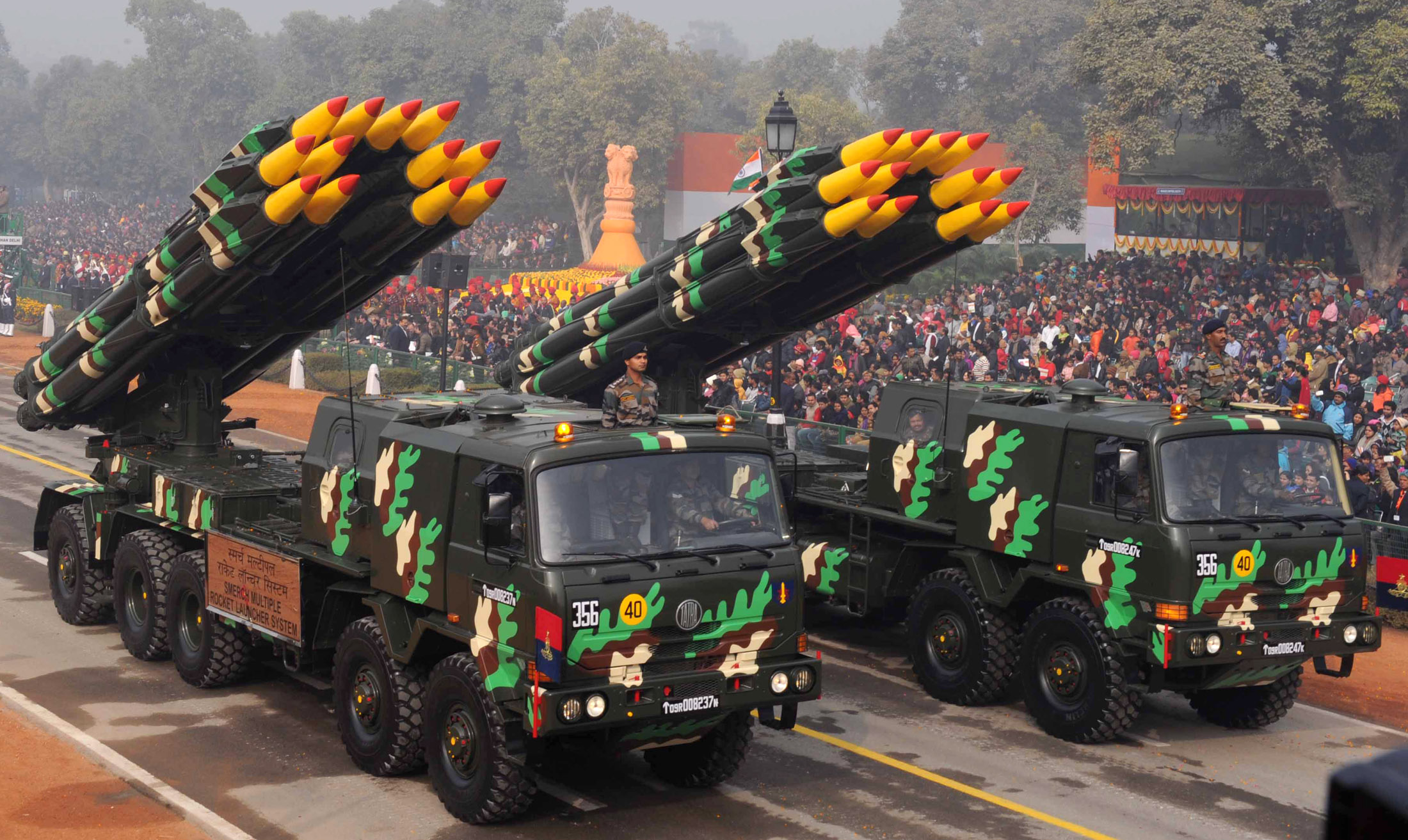
Smerch Multiple Rocket Launcher System of 1812 Rocket Regiment passes through the Rajpath, on the occasion of the 67th Republic Day Parade 2016

181 Light Battery was under 4 Mountain Artillery Brigade of the 4 Mountain Division during the Indo-Pakistani War of 1971 in the Jhenaidah–Kushtia sector. It was equipped with 120 mm Tampella mortars.

In April 1972, 181 Light Battery was bifurcated into 1812 (1) and 1812 (2) Light Batteries. 1812(1) Light Battery earned a significant distinction when in 1975, it was commanded by Major S Padmananbhan who later went on to become the Chief of Army Staff.

In 2009, the regiment took a pivotal step in its evolution when it was given the honour of converting to a Rocket Regiment equipped with the Russian-built BM-30 Smerch at Nasirabad, Ajmer. The regiment had the privilege to participate in the Republic Day parade, in New Delhi, on January 26, 2016.

== See also ==
- List of artillery regiments of Indian Army
