= 1841 Light Regiment (India) =

Indian Army artillery unit

- Active: 1966 – present
- Country: India
- Allegiance: India
- Branch: Indian Army
- Type: Artillery
- Size: Regiment
- Nickname(s): TMG Gunners
- Motto(s): SARVATRA, IZZAT-O-IQBAL “Everywhere With Honour and Glory”.
- Colors: "Red & Navy Blue"
- Decorations: Sena Medal 1 Vishisht Seva Medal 1 Mention in Despatches 2

1841 Light Regiment is a regiment which is part of the Regiment of Artillery of the Indian Army.

== Formation ==
1841 Light Regiment was initially raised as 184 Light Regiment (Pack) on 1 April 1966 at Pathankot. The class composition of the regiment was Sikhs, Dogras, Hill Tribes and ‘Other Indian Castes’. Consequent to reorganization in April 1973, the regiment was split into 1841 and 1842 (Independent) Light Battery. 1841 (Independent) Battery was later re-designated as 1841 Light Regiment in 1984.

== History ==
=== Indo-Pakistani War of 1971 ===
On 16 August 1971, the regiment moved to Easter Sector during the Indo-Pakistani War of 1971 and earned two Sena Medals and two Mention in Despatches.

=== Other operations ===
The regiment has also participated in Operation Rakshak, Parakram and Hifazat.

During its tenure in Jammu and Kashmir from September 2000 till August 2003, the regiment was in direct support of an infantry brigade deployed at the Line of Control in Naugam Sector at Tur Mar Gali (TMG). Victor Mortar Position was constructed as a new Mortar Position by the regiment at TMG. On 26 October 2002, GOC in Command Northern Command visited the position and placed on record his assessment that this was one of the best and most battle-ready mortar position in the entire Northern Command.

In recognition of its accurate fire assaults from TMG during Operation Parakram on 26 January 2004, the unit was awarded Northern Army Commander’s Unit Appreciation and since then were known as TMG Gunners. Lieutenant Colonel Mukesh Kumar Gupta, Commanding Officer was awarded Vishisht Seva Medal. Three 'COAS Commendation Cards' and one 'Army Commander Commendation Card' were also awarded to TMG Gunners.

The war cry of the unit is “ Durge Mata ki Jai, Peer Baba ki Jai.”

== See also ==
- List of artillery regiments of Indian Army
