= 125 SATA Regiment (India) =

- Active: 1958 – present
- Country: India
- Allegiance: India
- Branch: Indian Army
- Type: Artillery
- Size: Regiment
- Motto(s): SARVATRA, IZZAT-O-IQBAL “Everywhere with Honour and Glory” Divya Drishti Sarva Gyan
- Colors: "Red & Navy Blue"

Insignia
- Abbreviation: 125 SATA Regt

125 SATA Regiment, nicknamed the Sawalakh Regiment is a Surveillance and Target Acquisition (SATA) regiment, which is part of the Regiment of Artillery of the Indian Army.

== Formation ==
The Regiment was raised as 125 Division Locating Battery on 1 August 1958 in Haig Lines at School of Artillery, Deolali (Nashik district) under the command of Major (later Major General) Chajju Ram. The unit was reorganised to a SATA Regiment under Colonel J P Saikia on 1 January 2006.

== Equipment ==
The battery received its first specialised equipment, the Sound Ranging equipment and Locating Radar from the United Kingdom in the early 1960s. In recent times, the regiment became the first SATA Regiment to be equipped with the Israeli Heron Unmanned Aerial Vehicles (UAVs) and the home made Nishant UAVs.

== Operations ==
- Indo-Pakistani War of 1965
  - Operation Riddle: After the fall of Chhamb, Operation Riddle was ordered and the Battery received its mobilisation order in September 1965.
  - Battle of Burki – The battery was instrumental in the capture of 102 locations/positions of enemy guns and mortars, proving its competence and professionalism in battle tactics, optimising the use of artillery.
- Indo-Pakistani War of 1971
  - During Operation Cactus Lily, the unit proved its mettle during the operations in Patti.
- Operation Vijay
- Operation Parakram
- Operation Rakshak
- Operation Zafran
- Operation Meghdoot
- Operation Snow Leopard

== Honours and awards ==
- In 1960, during the Silver Jubilee celebrations of the Regiment of Artillery, the battery had the rare privilege of providing the guard of honour to the then Commander-in-Chief of the Indian Army General Maharaja Rajendra Singh Ji DSO.
- The regiment secured the second position in the Agnibaaz Division (41 Artillery Division) Athletics Championship Trophy in 2008
- The regiment was awarded the GOC-in-C Southern Command Unit Citation for the year 2011-12 for its overall performance and for its UAV missions in the Kameng Sector.
- The regiment was awarded the GOC-in-C Northern Command Unit Citation in January 2017 for its operational surveillance and for counter terrorist operations between 2014 and 2017 as part of Operation Rakshak in 15 Corps area. The regiment thus achieved the unique distinction of being the only SATA Regiment to be awarded the citations in successive tenures.
- COAS Commendation Cards

== See also ==
- List of artillery regiments of Indian Army
