= 54 Medium Regiment (India) =

- Active: 1963 – present
- Country: India
- Allegiance: India
- Branch: Indian Army
- Type: Artillery
- Size: Regiment
- Nickname: Fighting Fifty Four
- Mottos: Sarvatra, Izzat-O-Iqbal (Everywhere with Honour and Glory)
- Colors: Red & Navy Blue
- Anniversaries: 2 April – Raising Day

Insignia
- Abbreviation: 54 Med Regt

54 Medium Regiment is part of the Regiment of Artillery of the Indian Army.

== Formation and history ==
The regiment was raised on 2 April 1963 at Ambala Cantonment as 54 Mountain Regiment. The mule pack regiment was composed of five batteries – 214, 215 and 216 mountain batteries, one heavy mortar battery and a support battery. The first commanding officer was Lieutenant Colonel Rajinder Pal Mittal. The regiment, which was equipped with 3.7-inch howitzers moved to Sugar sector, from where it moved to the icy heights of Northern Sikkim in 1965. It moved to Tezpur in Assam in 1982. The regiment has served operationally in almost all the terrains in India including the deserts of Rajasthan, the icy heights of Siachen, the North East and in Punjab. The regiment has been converted to a field regiment and now is a medium regiment.

== Operations ==
The regiment has taken part in the following operations:

- Counter terrorist operations in Northeast India and Assam
- Operation Rakshak – 1990
- Operation Vyavastha – Rajasthan, 1992
- Operation Meghdoot - Siachen Glacier
- Counter terrorist operations in Jammu and Kashmir

== Gallantry awards ==
The regiment has won the following gallantry awards –

- GOC-in-C Southern Command Unit Appreciation
- Chief of Army Staff Commendation cards - 8
- General Officer Commanding-in-chief Commendation cards - 13

== War Cry ==
The war cry of the regiment is बोल कृष्ण भगवान की जय (Bol Krishna Bhagwan Ki Jai), which translates to Victory to Lord Krishna.

== See also ==
- List of artillery regiments of Indian Army
