= 67 Field Regiment (India) =

- Active: 1962 – present
- Country: India
- Allegiance: India
- Branch: Indian Army
- Type: Artillery
- Size: Regiment
- Mottos: Sarvatra, Izzat-O-Iqbal (Everywhere with Honour and Glory)
- Colors: Red & Navy Blue
- Anniversaries: 15 April – Raising Day

Insignia
- Abbreviation: 67 Fd Regt

67 Field Regiment is part of the Regiment of Artillery of the Indian Army.

== Formation and history ==
The regiment was raised on 15 April 1962 at Anand Parbat in New Delhi. The first commanding officer was Lieutenant Colonel Harsh Surinder Singh. The regiment has Maratha troops from Maharashtra and Karnataka.

== Operations ==
The regiment has taken part in the following operations –

- Indo-Pakistani War of 1965 – Operation Riddle
- Indo-Pakistani War of 1971 – (Operation Cactus Lily and Operation Windfall) : The regiment was equipped with 25-pounder guns and was under 9 Artillery Brigade (under 9 Infantry Division of 2 Corps) in the South Western sector. The regiment lost Lieutenant Colonel Mohan Dutt Anand, Captain V V Kulkarni and Naik Shambhu Nath Ram during the war. Lieutenant Colonel Mohan Dutt Anand, the commanding officer was killed by a freak bullet, which had entered through the side window of the helicopter in which he was flying on a terrain familiarisation mission. He was replaced by Lieutenant Colonel J C Saxena. The regiment took part in the Battle of Garibpur and Battle of Siramani. The regiment's name thus stands in the 2 Corps Memorial in Ambala Cantonment.
- Operation Trident – 1986-1987
- Operation Vijay – 1999
- Operation Parakram – 2001-2002
- Operation Rakshak – 2006 to 2009 – counter terrorist operations in Jammu and Kashmir.

== Gallantry awards ==
The regiment has won the following gallantry awards –

- Param Vishisht Seva Medal (PVSM) – 1
- Vishisht Seva Medal (VSM) – 2
- Chief of Army Staff Commendation cards – 8
- Vice Chief of Army Staff Commendation cards – 1
- General Officer Commanding-in-chief Commendation cards – 37

== War Cry ==
The war cry of the regiment is जय भवानी, जय शिवाजी (Jai Bhavani, Jai Shivaji).

== Other achievements ==
- A battery of the regiment had the honour of providing the 21-gun salute to visiting heads of state between 1962 and 1963.
- Havildar SD Ram Kore won the silver medal in archery during the 33rd National Games at Guwahati in 2007.

== See also ==
- List of artillery regiments of Indian Army
