= 47 Air Defence Regiment (India) =

- Active: 1962 – present
- Country: India
- Allegiance: India
- Branch: Indian Army
- Type: Corps of Army Air Defence
- Size: Regiment
- Nickname: Skyarchers
- Mottos: Sanskrit: आकाशे शत्रुन् जहि English: Defeat the Enemy in the Sky
- Colors: Sky Blue and Red
- Anniversaries: 1 April (Raising Day)
- Equipment: 40 mm L/70 Air Defence Gun

Insignia
- Abbreviation: 47 AD Regt

47 Air Defence Regiment is part of the Corps of Army Air Defence of the Indian Army. It consists of 175, 176 and 177 air defence batteries.

== Formation ==
47 Air Defence Regiment was raised on 1 April 1962 as 47 Light Anti-aircraft Regiment at Namkum. The first commanding officer was Lieutenant Colonel SV Bhiday.

== Equipment ==
At raising, the regiment was equipped with Bofors 40 mm L/60 guns. The inventory was upgraded to 40 mm L/70 Air Defence Gun and Super Fledermaus (SFM) radars in 1971. Flycatcher radars were inducted from 1996 to 2003. Tactical Control Radars were added to the unit in 2006.

== Operations ==
The regiment has taken part in the following operations

- Sino-Indian War: The first operational deployment of the unit was immediately after its formation in the war against China. The regiment was deployed in an infantry role.
- Indo-Pakistani War of 1965: The regiment was deployed in the Eastern sector
- Indo-Pakistani War of 1971: The unit took part in Operation Cactus Lily in the eastern sector.
- Operation Blue Star: It was deployed for internal security duties in Patiala district.
- Operation Trident: 1987.
- Internal security duties: The unit was deployed in Udaipur district of Rajasthan in 1990.
- Operation Rakshak: The regiment was tasked to close 70 km of the border with Pakistan during 1992 and 1993.
- Operation Vijay: It was deployed in Punjab sector during the conflict.
- Operation Parakram: Between 2001 and 2003, the unit was deployed in many crucial locations in Punjab and Jammu and Kashmir.
- 2006 Vadodara riots: The regiment was deployed for internal security duties during the riots in May 2006.
- 2006 Surat flood: Two columns from the regiment were deployed for flood relief in August 2006.
- Operation Rakshak: The unit was deployed in Jammu and Kashmir in 2000, 2001, 2004 and 2009. It was also deployed for Road Opening Party (ROP) and securing National Highway 1A. The regiment was also involved in support of developmental activities locally.

== Honours and awards ==
Personnel from the unit have been awarded the following awards

- Kirti Chakra – 1 (Major Sushil Aima (posthumous), while posted to 17 Rashtriya Rifles)
- Sena Medal – 1
- Mentioned in dispatches – 1
- COAS Commendation Cards – 5
- GOC-in-C Commendation Cards – 16

== Other achievements ==
- The Regiment was awarded Director General Army Air Defence Unit Appreciation award in 2012.
- Major (later Colonel) Satash Kumar and three other ranks from the unit took part in the Army Air Defence mountaineering expedition to Mount Kailash in 2003. Satash Kumar went on to lead many other mountaineering expeditions, including one to Mount Chaukhamba.
