= 130 AD Regiment (India) =

- Active: 1967 – present
- Country: India
- Allegiance: India
- Branch: Indian Army
- Type: Corps of Army Air Defence
- Size: Regiment
- Motto(s): Sanskrit: आकाशे शत्रुन् जहि English: Defeat the Enemy in the Sky
- Colors: Sky Blue and Red
- Anniversaries: 28 January (Raising Day)
- Equipment: 40 mm L/70 Air Defence Gun

Insignia
- Abbreviation: 130 AD Regt

130 Air Defence Regiment is part of the Corps of Army Air Defence of the Indian Army.

== Formation ==
130 Air Defence Regiment was raised on 28 January 1967 as a provisional Territorial Army unit in Assam. It was regularised as a regular air defence regiment of the Indian Artillery after the 1971 war.

== Operations ==
The regiment has taken part in the following operations -

Indo-Pakistani War of 1971
The unit was assigned to protect vital installations in the Eastern, Western and Northern sectors, which it carried out with distinction.
Operation Trident
The regiment was deployed in the desert sector in 1987 during this operation.
Operation Vijay
The unit was the only Air Defence Regiment to be deployed during the action on the icy heights of Kargil. It was under the command of Colonel Ajit Palekar. Personnel from the unit were awarded one Sena Medal (Lieutenant Pradipta Dutta) and four GOC-in-C Commendation Cards for exceptional bravery during the war.
Operation Parakram
Operation Rakshak
Counter-insurgency operations
Aid to civil authorities
During relief operations in Haryana, Gujarat and Punjab.

== Other achievements ==
- It was the first ever air defence regiment to send an overseas training contingent to Sri Lanka in 2007.
- The regiment conducted the Army Air Defence enclosure during Shauryanjali, the 2015 Indian Army exhibition to commemorate the Golden Jubilee of the Indo-Pakistani War of 1965.
- The Regiment was awarded Director General Army Air Defence Unit Appreciation award twice for exceptional performance in all spheres – first in 2005 and then in 2015.
- Havildar Kaushlendra Pratap Singh and Naik Satendra Singh were awarded COAS Commendation Cards in August 2025 for Operation Sindoor.
- Naib Subedar Rajbir Singh was awarded COAS Commendation Card in August 2025.

== War Cry ==
The war cry of the regiment is दुर्गा माता की जय (Durga Māta Ki Jai), which translates to Victory to the Mother Goddess Durga. The war cry stands for the courage and resolute fighting spirit of the unit.

== Honours and awards ==
Personnel from the unit have been awarded the following –

- Vishisht Seva Medal – 1
- Sena Medal – 2
- COAS Commendation Cards – 7
- GOC-in-C Commendation Cards – 31
