= 127 Light Air Defence Regiment (Composite) =

127 Light AD Regiment (Composite)
- Active: 1951 – present
- Country: India
- Allegiance: India
- Branch: Indian Army
- Type: Corps of Army Air Defence
- Size: Regiment
- Nickname: Jetbusters
- Mottos: Sanskrit: आकाशे शत्रुन् जहि English: Defeat the Enemy in the Sky
- Colors: Sky Blue and Red
- Anniversaries: 31 March (Raising Day)
- Equipment: ZU-23-2 twin-barreled autocannon 9K38 Igla surface-to-air missile

Insignia
- Abbreviation: 127 Lt AD Regt (Comp)

127 Light Air Defence Regiment (Composite) is part of the Corps of Army Air Defence of the Indian Army. It consists of 581, 582 and 583 Light Air Defence batteries.

== Formation and history ==
127 Light Air Defence Regiment (Composite) was raised on 31 March 1951 as 127 Light Anti-aircraft Regiment (Territorial Army) at Satara. It was raised as a single class regiment with Maratha troops. At formation, the regiment was equipped with Bofors 40 mm L/60 guns.

The regiment was regularised as a regular air defence regiment of the Indian Artillery in 1973 at Hyderabad and was renamed as 127 Light Air Defence Regiment. The unit got its present designation in 1989.

== Operations ==
The regiment has taken part in the following operations-

- Operation Vijay: The first operational deployment of the unit was during the liberation of Goa from the Portuguese in 1961.
- Indo-Pakistani War of 1965: Operation Riddle
- Indo-Pakistani War of 1971: The unit took part in Operation Cactus Lily in the western sector. It successfully repelled many air raids and shot down a B-57 bomber.
- Operation Meghdoot: The regiment took part in the operations in Siachen Glacier between 1984 and 1986. It became the first unit to deploy air defence guns at the highest battlefield in the world.
- Operation Rakshak: The unit was active in counter-insurgency operations in Punjab and Jammu and Kashmir (1987-1990, 1992, 2004-2007).
- Operation Trident: 1987
- Operation Parakram: 2001-2002

== Honours and awards ==
Personnel from the unit have been awarded the following awards-

- Vir Chakra – 1
- Sena Medal – 1
- COAS Commendation Cards – 8
- GOC-in-C Commendation Cards – 18

== Other achievements ==
- The Regiment was awarded Director General Army Air Defence Unit Appreciation award in 2006.

== Motto ==
The motto of the regiment is एक दो सात, विजय हमारे साथ (Ek do saat, vijay hamare saath), which translates to One, two, seven, victory is with us.
