= 103 Air Defence Regiment (India) =

- Active: 1949 – present
- Country: India
- Allegiance: India
- Branch: Indian Army
- Type: Corps of Army Air Defence
- Size: Regiment
- Nickname: Gagan Rakshak
- Mottos: Sanskrit: आकाशे शत्रुन् जहि English: Defeat the Enemy in the Sky
- Colors: Sky Blue and Red
- Anniversaries: 22 August (Raising Day)
- Equipment: 40 mm L/70 Air Defence Gun

Insignia
- Abbreviation: 103 AD Regt

103 Air Defence Regiment is part of the Corps of Army Air Defence of the Indian Army.

== Formation ==
103 Air Defence Regiment was raised on 22 August 1949 at Colaba in Bombay (now Mumbai) as 103 Heavy Anti-Aircraft Regiment of the Territorial Army. It consists of 509, 510 and 511 air defence batteries. The regiment has been subsequently converted to a regular regiment of the Indian Army.

== Operations ==
The regiment has taken part in the following operations

- Liberation of Goa: Operation Vijay, 1961
- Indo-Pakistani War of 1965: Operation Ablaze
- Indo-Pakistani War of 1971: The unit took part in Operation Cactus Lily in the western sector.
- Operation Trident: Military exercise
- Operation Rakshak: Counter insurgency operations
- Kargil War: Operation Vijay
- Operation Parakram
- Operation Zafran: 2019

== Honours and achievements ==
- The regiment was awarded Director General Army Air Defence Unit Appreciation award in 2016.
- The regiment was awarded General Officer Commanding in Chief Unit Citation in 2014 and 2018.
- Major Upendra Prasad Desaiji, Havildar (BQMH) Krishna Oak and Lance Havildar Sonu Chavan were Mentioned in dispatches during the 1971 war.
- Lieutenant Abhinav Kumar was awarded the COAS Commendation Card in August 2025 for Operation Sindoor.
- BHM Dharmendra Chaurasia was awarded the COAS Commendation Card in August 2026.

== War cry ==
The war cry of the regiment is Gagan Rakshak Ka Hai Nara, Bache Na Shatru Hamara (गगन रक्षक का है नारा, बचे ना शत्रु हमारा ), which loosely translates to The slogan of the sky defenders is, our enemy should not survive.
