= 49 Air Defence Regiment (India) =

- Active: 1964 – present
- Country: India
- Allegiance: India
- Branch: Indian Army
- Type: Corps of Army Air Defence
- Size: Regiment
- Motto(s): Sanskrit: आकाशे शत्रुन् जहि English: Defeat the Enemy in the Sky
- Colors: Sky Blue and Red
- Anniversaries: 1 May (Raising Day)

Insignia
- Abbreviation: 49 AD Regt

49 Air Defence Regiment is part of the Corps of Army Air Defence of the Indian Army. It consists of 491, 492 and 493 air defence batteries.

== Formation ==
49 Air Defence Regiment was raised on 1 May 1964 at Delhi Cantonment. The first commanding officer was Lieutenant Colonel PS Bakshi, who assumed command on 23 May 1964. The regiment, at formation, was composed of Ahir, Bengali and Bihari troops.

== Operations ==
The regiment has taken part in the following operations-

- Indo-Pakistani War of 1965: The regiment was deployed in the western sector and participated in Operation Ablaze and Operation Riddle. The first action it saw, was when its guns opened fire on suspected paratroopers at Ambala on 8 September 1965. It hit a Pakistani B-57 bomber on 10 September 1965.
- Indo-Pakistani War of 1971: The unit took part in Operation Cactus Lily in the western sector in Punjab and Rajasthan covering the 11 Corps formations (under 7 and 15 Infantry Divisions). The regiment scored five hits against Pakistani aircraft – two F-104 Starfighters and a B-57 on 5 December 1971; and a F-86 Sabre on 7 December 1971. On 14 December 1971, an enemy attack by four F-86 Sabres were successfully repulsed, one aircraft was hit and crashed into Pakistani territory. For its credible performance during the war, the General Officer Commanding 11 Corps sent a complimentary message to the unit.
- Operation Blue Star
- Operation Trident - 1987.
- Operation Rakshak I, II and III.
- Operation Vijay
- Operation Parakram
- Operation Marusthal
- The unit was deployed for Road Opening Party (ROP) duties and securing National Highway 1A from Nachlana to Ramban in 2003 and National Highway 44 at Srinagar in 2013.
- It worked under Counter Insurgency Force (CIF) V / Victor Force at Khunmoh in 2013.

== Honours and awards ==
Personnel from the unit have been awarded the following awards-

- Sena Medal – 6
- COAS Commendation Cards – 6
- VCOAS Commendation Cards – 1
- GOC-in-C Commendation Cards – 20

== Other achievements ==
- The Regiment was awarded Director General Army Air Defence Unit Appreciation award in 2005.
- It won the Air Defence Brigade banner championship in 2011-12 and 2012–13.
- Three officers, two JCOs and three other ranks from the regiment took part in Indian Army United Nations peacekeeping missions.
- One JCO and six other ranks took part in Indian Peace Keeping Force in Sri Lanka.
