= 156 Light AD Missile Regiment (Self propelled) =

156 Light Air Defence Missile Regiment (Self Propelled)
- Active: 1982 – present
- Country: India
- Allegiance: India
- Branch: Indian Army
- Type: Corps of Army Air Defence
- Size: Regiment
- Nickname(s): “The Only Ones”
- Motto(s): Nulli Secundus (Latin for "Second to None")
- Colors: Sky Blue and Red
- Equipment: Strela-10M

Insignia
- Abbreviation: 156 Lt AD Msl Regt (SP)

156 Light Air Defence Missile Regiment (Self Propelled) is an Air Defence regiment of the Indian Army.

== Formation ==
The regiment was raised at Kamptee on 01 May 1982 under the command of Lieutenant Colonel (later Brigadier) SS Gyani. At the time of its formation, the Regiment was equipped with 40 mm L/70 guns.

== History ==
The regiment was initially placed under 97 (Independent) Artillery Brigade of Southern Command. Between 1983 and 1987, the unit was part of the 611 (Independent) Air Defence Brigade.

The unit moved to Delhi Cantonment in 1987 and came under the 627 (Independent) Mechanised Air Defence Brigade, where it was re-organised into a Light Air Defence Missile Regiment (Self Propelled) in 1989 and equipped with the Strela-10M weapon system. The unit thus assumed the role of a frontline fighting unit, providing intimate air defence to mechanised forces. The unit became part of 16 (Independent) Armoured Brigade in 1994 and 769 (Independent) Air Defence Brigade in 2001.

== Operations ==
The regiment has taken part in the following operations-

- Operation Trident: It took part between January and March 1987, while part of 611 (Independent) Air Defence Brigade.
- Operation Vijay: The regiment was deployed along with various combat groups of the 16 (Independent) Armoured Brigade.
- Operation Parakram: Between December 2001 to December 2002.
- Indian Army operations in Jammu and Kashmir: Personnel from the unit have been deployed in counter insurgency operation in Jammu and Kashmir at various times as part of Rashtriya Rifles battalions.

== Honours and awards ==
- Shaurya Chakra – Gnr (DMT) Suresh Chand
- Sena Medal – Lieutenant Colonel Surendra Kumar (twice)
- 5 COAS Commendation Cards, 1 DG NSG Commendation Card, 6 GOC-in-C Commendation Cards.
- The Regiment participated with its Strela missiles in the Republic Day parade in 1990, and with the Tactical Control Radar Reporter in 2011.
