= 29 AD Regiment (Samba) =

- Active: 1957 – present
- Country: India
- Allegiance: India
- Branch: Indian Army
- Type: Corps of Army Air Defence
- Size: Regiment
- Motto(s): Sanskrit: आकाशे शत्रुन् जहि English: Defeat the Enemy in the Sky; Ho ki hoi na! ho!!!
- Colors: Sky Blue and Red
- Anniversaries: 1 January (Raising Day); 7 December (Battle Honours Day)
- Decorations: Vir Chakra 2 Sena Medal 4 Mention in Despatches 8
- Battle honours: ‘SAMBA VA / VP’

Insignia
- Abbreviation: 29 AD Regt

29 Air Defence Regiment (Samba) is an Air Defence regiment of the Indian Army.

== Formation ==
The Regiment was raised on 1 January 1957 at Trimulgherry in Secunderabad and the first commanding officer was Lieutenant Colonel (later Brigadier) Kanwar Bharat Singh. It was designated the 29 Light Anti-Aircraft Regiment and was equipped with 40 mm, L-60 guns. The initial troops were from the 8 and 9 Border Scout Battalions. The regiment consists of 107, 108 and 109 air defence batteries.

== Class composition ==
The regiment consists of a battery each of Kumaoni, Garhwali and Gorkhali troops.

== Operations ==
Indo-Pak War (1965)
The regiment participated in Operation Ablaze between April and July 1965. It then saw action during Operation Riddle in the Sialkot sector under the command of 1 Armoured Division from September to December 1965. It was the only air defence regiment integral to a field formation and was equipped with the self-propelled 40 mm, L-60 guns mounted on Morris trucks. Gunner (DMT) Prem Kumar was killed by enemy fire while taking down a Pakistani Sabre jet near the Ammunition Point at Charma. In another incident, Major Harnam Grover, the Battery Commander of 107 AD Battery, personally took on a Pakistani aircraft and shot it down, but was seriously injured. For this brave actions, he was awarded the first gallantry award of the regiment in the form of mentioned in dispatches. Following these incidents, the regiments got the sobriquet of "Sabre Slayers of Sialkot".
Indo-Pakistani War of 1971
The regiment provided air defence protection to the assets of 1 Corps in the Samba Sector. The gunners of the regiment successfully repulsed many Pakistani aircraft attacks on Indian airfields in the western border. 7 December 1971 saw an intense air defence battle over the skies of Samba. During four different air raids, 14 Pakistani aircraft attacked the artillery gun areas located in the Samba Sector. These raids were effectively beaten back forcing the Pakistani Air Force to change tactics and attack the air defence guns itself. During this battle, four Pakistani aircraft (three MiG-19s and one Sabre Jet) were shot. Gunner Bhadreshwar Pathak was posthumously awarded the Vir Chakra. He was deployed for protection of the gun area of a medium regiment and had successfully hit a MiG 19 on 7 December 1971. On the next day, five Sabre jets attacked his gun position. Disregarding his personal safety, he kept on supplying ammunition to his gun, till he was fatally wounded. Lance Havildar Bal Bahadur was awarded the second Vir Chakra for shooting down two Pakistani aircraft. The gunners of the regiment took down a total of eleven aircraft during the war - five MiGs and six F-86 Sabres. For its exceptional performance in the war and heroic action of the gunners, the regiment was given the honour title Samba Vulnerable Area / Vulnerable Point. In addition to the two Vir Chakras, the regiment was awarded three Sena Medals (Naib Subedar Sardar Singh, Havildar Hira Singh, Naik Sohan Singh) and seven mentioned in dispatches.
Other Operations -

- Counter-insurgency operations
- Operation Vijay – 17 June 1999 to 1 November 1999
- Operation Parakram – 18 December 2001 to 9 January 2003
- 2019 Vadodara flood – The regiment took part in rescue operations and evacuated more than 1,000 people and shifted almost 3,000 stranded railway passengers.

== Regimental Motto ==
The motto of the regiment is Ho ki hoi na! ho!!!, which loosely translates to What is there now won’t be there tomorrow, so live for today.

== Other achievements ==
1. Honour Title - 29 AD Regiment was tasked to provide air defence protection to Vulnerable Areas / Vulnerable Points (VAs/VPs) of a Strike Corps during 1971 Operations. It provided AD protection to medium guns of an Independent Artillery Brigade. During the course of the operation, the Pakistan Air Force carried out several air raids on the VAs/VPs. The maximum onslaught was on 03 December 1971, when 13 MiG-19 and four F-86 Sabres attacked the gun areas. 29 AD Regiment successfully repulsed the attacks without any damage to the gun areas. Five MiG-19 and six f-86 Sabres were shot down by the Regiment. For the commendable performance in the Samba Sector, 29 AD Regiment was awarded the Battle Honour title "SAMBA VA/VP".
2. The regiment was awarded the Director General Army Air Defence's (DGAAD) unit appreciation award four times in the years 2005, 2011, 2013 and 2020.
3. The unit was awarded the GOC-in-C Southern Command Unit Citation in the year 2020.

== Notable personnel ==
Lieutenant General Kuldip Singh PVSM, AVSM, ADC – He was commissioned in the regiment and was Director General of Army Air Defence from July 2011 to June 2013.
