= 436 Air Defence Missile Regiment (India) =

436 Air Defence Missile Regiment (Self Propelled)
- Active: 1985 – present
- Country: India
- Allegiance: India
- Branch: Indian Army
- Type: Corps of Army Air Defence
- Size: Regiment
- Nickname: Gagan Rakshak
- Mottos: Sanskrit: आकाशे शत्रुन् जहि English: Defeat the Enemy in the Sky
- Colors: Sky Blue and Red
- Equipment: Osa-AK Missile System

Insignia
- Abbreviation: 436 AD Msl Regt (SP)

436 Air Defence Missile Regiment (Self Propelled) is part of the Corps of Army Air Defence of the Indian Army.

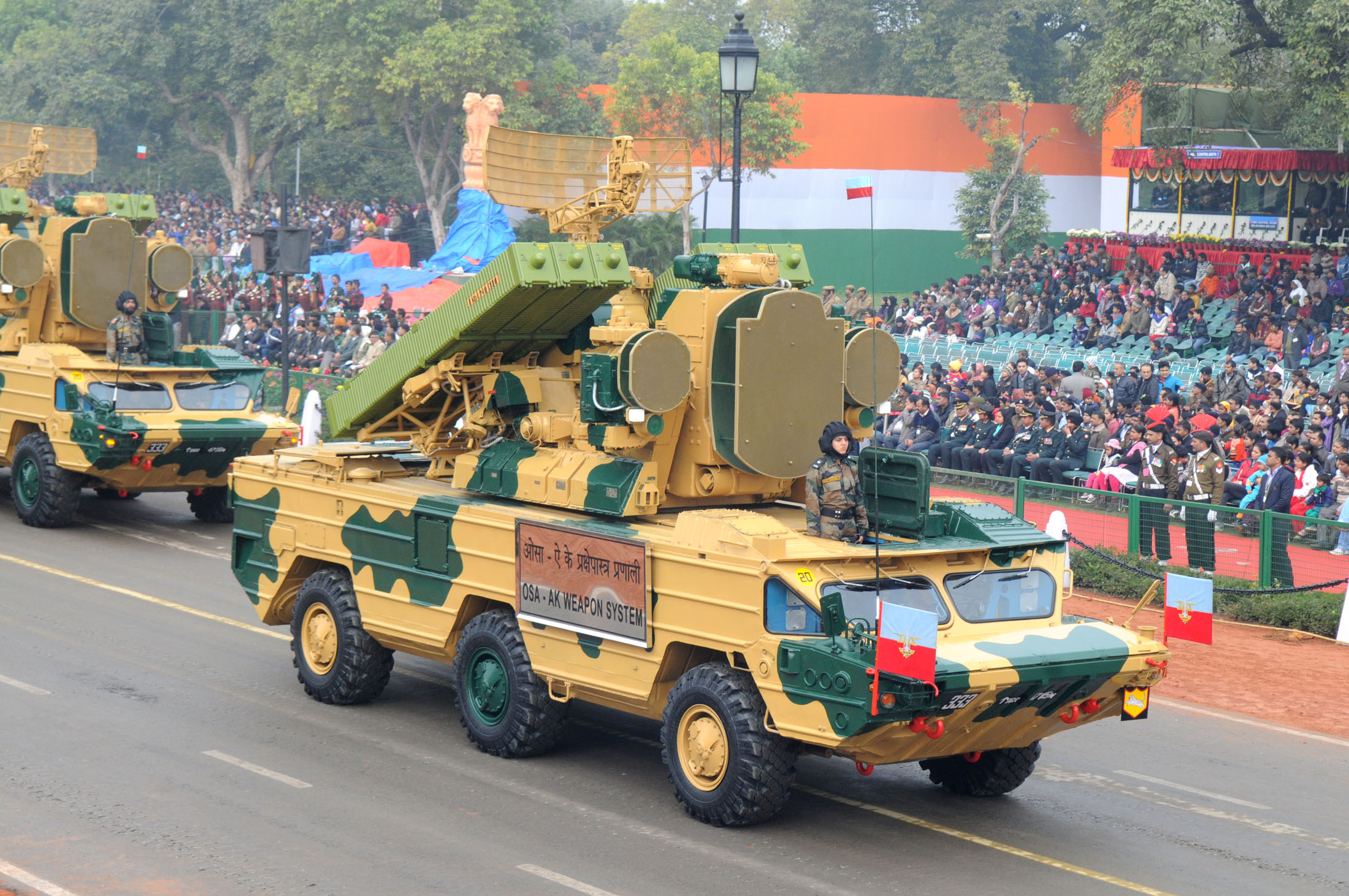
Osa - AK Weapon System of the regiment during the rehearsal for the Republic Day Parade, 2014

== Formation ==
436 Air Defence Regiment was raised in 1985 and equipped with ZSU-23-4 Shilka self-propelled air defence weapon systems. The weapon platform was subsequently changed to Osa-AK Missile Systems. The regiment consists of 4361, 4362 and 4363 air defence batteries.

== Operations ==
The regiment has taken part in the following operations -

- Operation Trident
- Operation Rakshak: Counter insurgency operations
- Kargil War: Operation Vijay
- Operation Parakram

== Achievements ==
- The regiment had the honour to participate in the Republic Day Parade in 1989, 1994 and 2014 with its Osa-AK weapon systems.
