= 48 AD Regiment (India) =

48 Air Defence Regiment
- Active: 1962 – present
- Country: India
- Allegiance: India
- Branch: Indian Army
- Type: Corps of Army Air Defence
- Size: Regiment
- Nickname(s): “Sky Shooters”
- Motto(s): Sanskrit: आकाशे शत्रुन् जहि English: Defeat the Enemy in the Sky
- Colors: Sky Blue and Red
- Equipment: 40 mm L/70

Insignia
- Abbreviation: 48 AD Regt

48 Air Defence Regiment is an Air Defence regiment of the Indian Army.

== Formation ==
The regiment was raised on 1 May 1962 under the command of Lieutenant Colonel RTK Foregard as 48 Light Anti-Aircraft Regiment at Deolali.

== Equipment ==
At the time of its formation, the Regiment was equipped with Bofors 40 mm L-60 anti-aircraft guns. Conversion to 40 mm L/70 guns was started on 20 May 1972 and completed on 27 July 1973. The Upgraded Super Fledermaus (USFM) radar replaced the Super Fledermaus (SFM) radars in September 2000.

== Operations ==
The regiment has taken part in the following operations-

- Indo-Pakistani War of 1965: The regiment took part in Operation Ablaze and Operation Savage in the Eastern Sector. It protected airfields and critical areas, including deployment over rafts over the Brahmaputra River.
- Indo-Pakistani War of 1971: The regiment served in both the Western and Eastern Sectors, covering a long period from 20 August 1971 to 12 March 1972. It protected many vital areas during this operation.
- Operation Trident: The regiment took part in this massive exercise in 1987.
- Operation Rakshak I: The regiment was involved in counter-insurgency roles in 1991.
- Operation Rakshak II: The regiment took part in counter-insurgency operations in the Kashmir Valley between 1995 and 1997.
- Operation Vijay: The regiment was actively involved between 26 May 1999 and 12 November 1999 in the Western desert.
- Operation Sahayata : The unit was deployed from 27 October 2001 to 5 November 2001 to aid the civilian authorities in the riot hit town of Malegaon
- Operation Parakram: The regiment was fully geared up during this operation between December 2001 and November 2002.
- Officers and men from the regiment have been deputed for anti-terrorist operations as part of Rashtriya Rifles.

== Honours and awards ==
- The regiment has won the following awards -
  - Param Vishisht Seva Medal – 1
  - Sena Medal – 4
  - Vishisht Seva Medal – 1
  - Mentioned in dispatches – 1
  - COAS Commendation Cards – 6
  - CIDS Commendation Card – 1
  - GOC-in-C Commendation Card – 18
