= 10 Field Regiment (India) =

Indian Army artillery unit

- Active: 1954 – present
- Country: India
- Allegiance: India
- Branch: Indian Army
- Type: Artillery
- Size: Regiment
- Nickname: Tenners
- Mottos: Sarvatra, Izzat-O-Iqbal (Everywhere with Honour and Glory).
- Colors: Red & Navy Blue
- Anniversaries: 25 September – Raising Day
- Equipment: 105/37 mm IFG guns

Insignia
- Abbreviation: 10 Fd Regt

10 Field Regiment is part of the Regiment of Artillery of the Indian Army.

== Formation ==
The regiment was raised on 25 September 1954 at Firozpur. It was formed to make for the shortage of artillery units after independence. 5 East Punjab Frontier (EPF) Militia Battalion located near Thakurpur, Gurdaspur was re-organised as 77 Field Battery Border Scouts. Similarly, 11 and 4 EPF Militia Battalions were re-organised as 78 and 79 Field Battery Border Scouts. In August 1954, the three batteries were brought together to form 10 Field Regiment. Lieutenant Colonel Cyril Anthony Lobo from 9 Field Regiment was sent to become the first commanding officer on 27 October 1954. The regiment converted to a medium regiment in 2010. In 2022, it was converted back to a field regiment.

== Class composition ==
At the time of its raising, the regiment had an ‘All India All Class’ composition, recruiting troops from all parts of the country. In 1960, the regiment was changed to a fixed class composition – 77 battery – Sikhs, 78 battery – Ahirs and 79 battery – Brahmins. The regiment reverted to its ‘All India All Class’ composition in 1999.

== Equipment ==
Following its conversion to a medium regiment in 2010, the regiment has been equipped with 130 mm guns. After its conversion to a field regiment in 2022, the regiment has been equipped with 105/37 mm Indian Field guns (Mark II).

== Operations ==
The regiment has taken part in the following operations –

- Operation Vijay – The regiment took part in the operations to liberate Goa from Portuguese rule in 1961.
- Sino-Indian War
- Operation Blue Star – The regiment was responsible for maintaining law and order in Muktsar during the operations.
- Operation Trident
- Operation Parakram – The regiment took active part in the operation and its guns saw action against the Pakistani army.
- The regiment has taken part in counter insurgency operations near the Line of Control.

== Honours and achievements ==
- The regiment had the honour to be part of the President’s guard in December 2013.
- The regiment has produced two Director Generals of Artillery, three Lieutenant Generals, six Major Generals and 12 Brigadiers.

== Regimental Insignia ==
As the regiment traces its history from the border scouts, it retains the Garuda as its regimental insignia.

== See also ==
- List of artillery regiments of Indian Army
