= 25 AD Regiment (India) =

Unit of the Indian Army

25 Air Defence Regiment
- Active: 1959 – present
- Country: India
- Allegiance: India
- Branch: Indian Army
- Type: Corps of Army Air Defence
- Size: Regiment
- Nickname: Quarter centurions
- Mottos: Sanskrit: आकाशे शत्रुन् जहि English: Defeat the Enemy in the Sky; Sanskrit: सर्वदा सर्व प्रथम; English: First, always and everywhere
- Colors: Sky Blue and Red
- Anniversaries: 15 December (Raising Day)
- Equipment: 40 mm L/70 Air Defence Gun

Insignia
- Abbreviation: 25 AD Regt

25 Air Defence Regiment is part of the Corps of Army Air Defence of the Indian Army.

== Formation ==
25 Air Defence Regiment was raised on 15 December 1959 at Deolali. It consists of 132, 133 and 134 air defence batteries.

== Operations ==
The regiment has taken part in the following operations

- Indo-Pakistani War of 1965: Operation Ablaze and Operation Riddle
- Indo-Pakistani War of 1971: The unit took part in Operation Cactus Lily and was part of 342 Independent Air Defence Brigade. It was equipped with L70 guns.
- Operation Blue Star
- Operation Trident
- Operation Rakshak II
- Operation Vijay
- Operation Parakram

== Gallantry awards ==
- RHM Bhise Satish Dilip was awarded COAS Commendation Card in August 2025 for Operation Sindoor.
