= 514 Air Defence Regiment (India) =

514 Air Defence Regiment (Self Propelled)
- Country: India
- Allegiance: India
- Branch: Indian Army
- Type: Corps of Army Air Defence
- Size: Regiment
- Mottos: Sanskrit: आकाशे शत्रुन् जहि English: Defeat the Enemy in the Sky
- Colors: Sky Blue and Red
- Anniversaries: 1 May (Raising day)
- Equipment: Tunguska tracked self-propelled anti-aircraft gun

Insignia
- Abbreviation: 514 AD Regt (SP)

514 Air Defence Regiment (Self Propelled) is part of the Corps of Army Air Defence of the Indian Army.

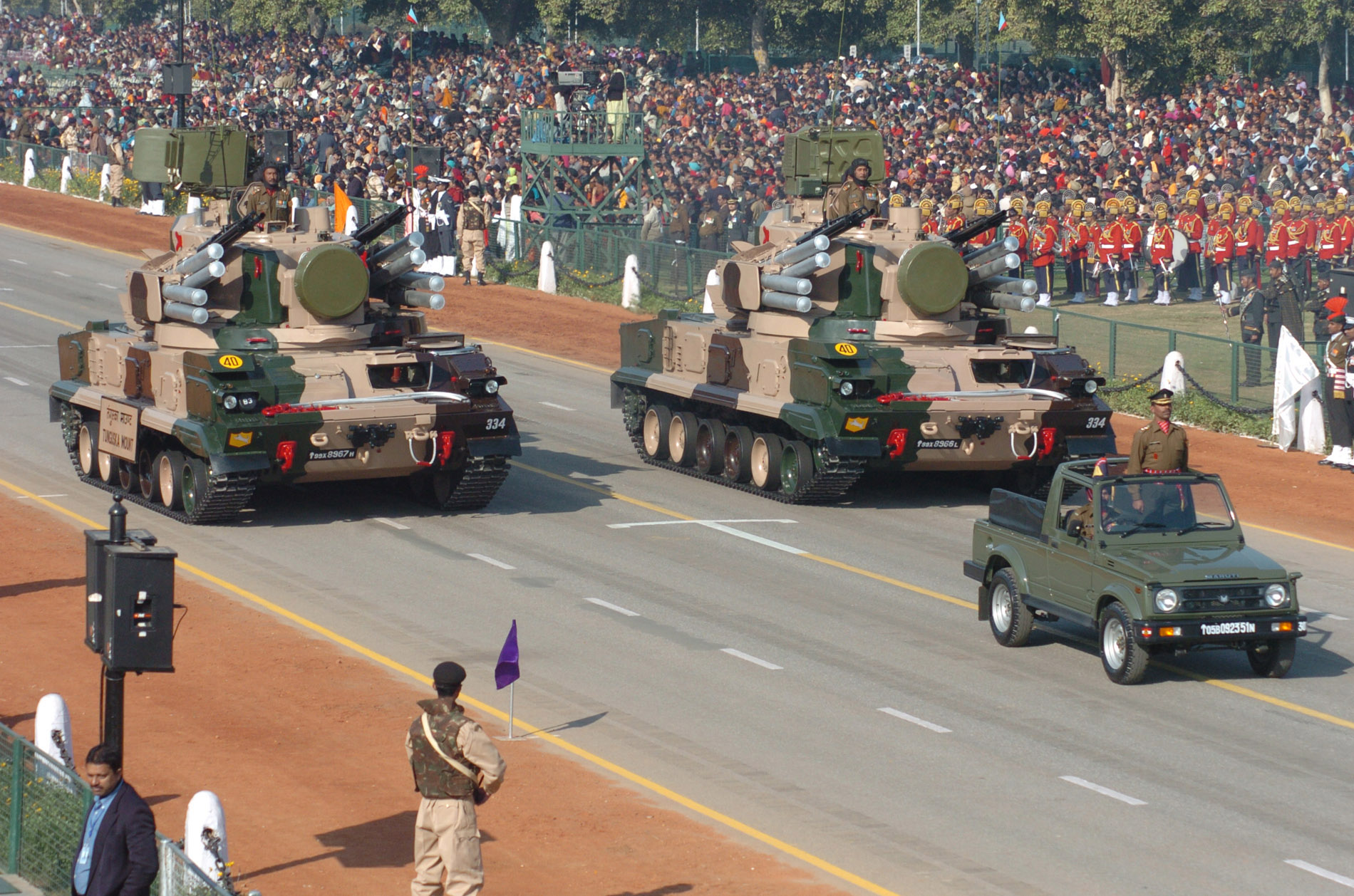
Tunguska Mount System of the regiment during the Republic Day Parade, 2006

== Operations ==
The regiment has taken part in the following operations -

- Kargil War: Operation Vijay
- Operation Parakram

== Achievements ==
- The regiment had the honour to participate in the Republic Day Parade in 1999, 2000, 2001, 2004, 2005, 2006 and 2008 with its Tunguska tracked self-propelled anti-aircraft guns.
- The Regiment was awarded the Director General Army Air Defence's (DGAAD) unit appreciation award in 2004 and 2011.
- The Regiment was awarded a unit citation by General Officer Command in Chief (Southern Command) in 2004.
