= 28 AD Regiment (India) =

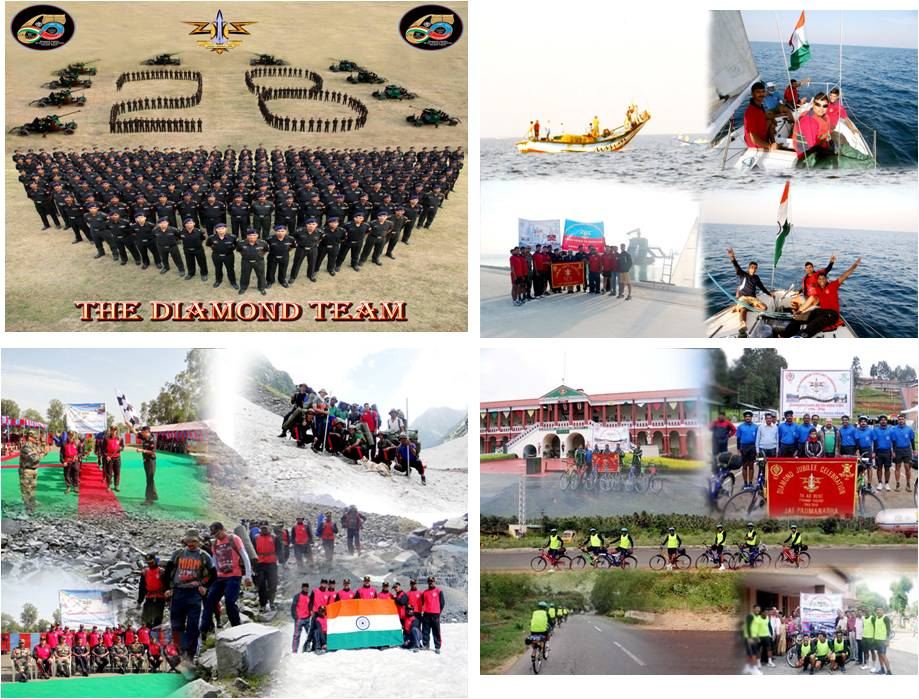
- Active: 1956 – present
- Country: India
- Allegiance: India
- Branch: Indian Army
- Type: Corps of Army Air Defence
- Size: Regiment
- Nickname: Thambi Tigers
- Mottos: Sanskrit: आकाशे शत्रुन् जहि English: Defeat the Enemy in the Sky
- Colors: Sky Blue and Red
- Anniversaries: 14 May (Raising Day)
- Equipment: 40 mm L/70 Air Defence Gun

Insignia
- Abbreviation: 28 AD Regt

28 Air Defence Regiment is part of the Corps of Army Air Defence of the Indian Army.

== Formation ==
The Regiment was raised as 28 Light Anti-Aircraft Regiment on 14 May 1956 at Ibrahim Bagh Lines, overlooking the Golconda Fort in Hyderabad. The first commanding officer was Lieutenant Colonel Gurpratap Singh.

The regiment was raised from troops from 16th Battalion, The Madras Regiment (Travancore), which itself traces its origins to the 2nd Travancore Nayar Infantry. The battalion was raised on 28 January 1819 in the erstwhile kingdom of Travancore. In August 1965, the regiment was re-designated as 28 Air Defence Regiment.

== Class composition ==
Most of the troops are from the four southern states of Kerala, Karnataka, Tamil Nadu and Andhra Pradesh.

== Operations ==
Indo-Pak War (1965)
The regiment participated in Operation Riddle and was responsible for providing air defence to two airfields. It took down two Sabre jets during the war. Lance Naik Madalai Muthu of 104 Air Defence Battery was awarded the Vir Chakra for shooting down a Sabre jet over Kalaikunda Air Force Station on 7 September 1965.
Indo-Pakistani War of 1971
During Operation Cactus Lily, the regiment provided air defence protection in the eastern sector till 6 December 1971, following which it provided protection to airfields and ammunition depots in the western sector.

Affiliation ceremony of 28 AD Regiment with the Madras Regiment, November 2018
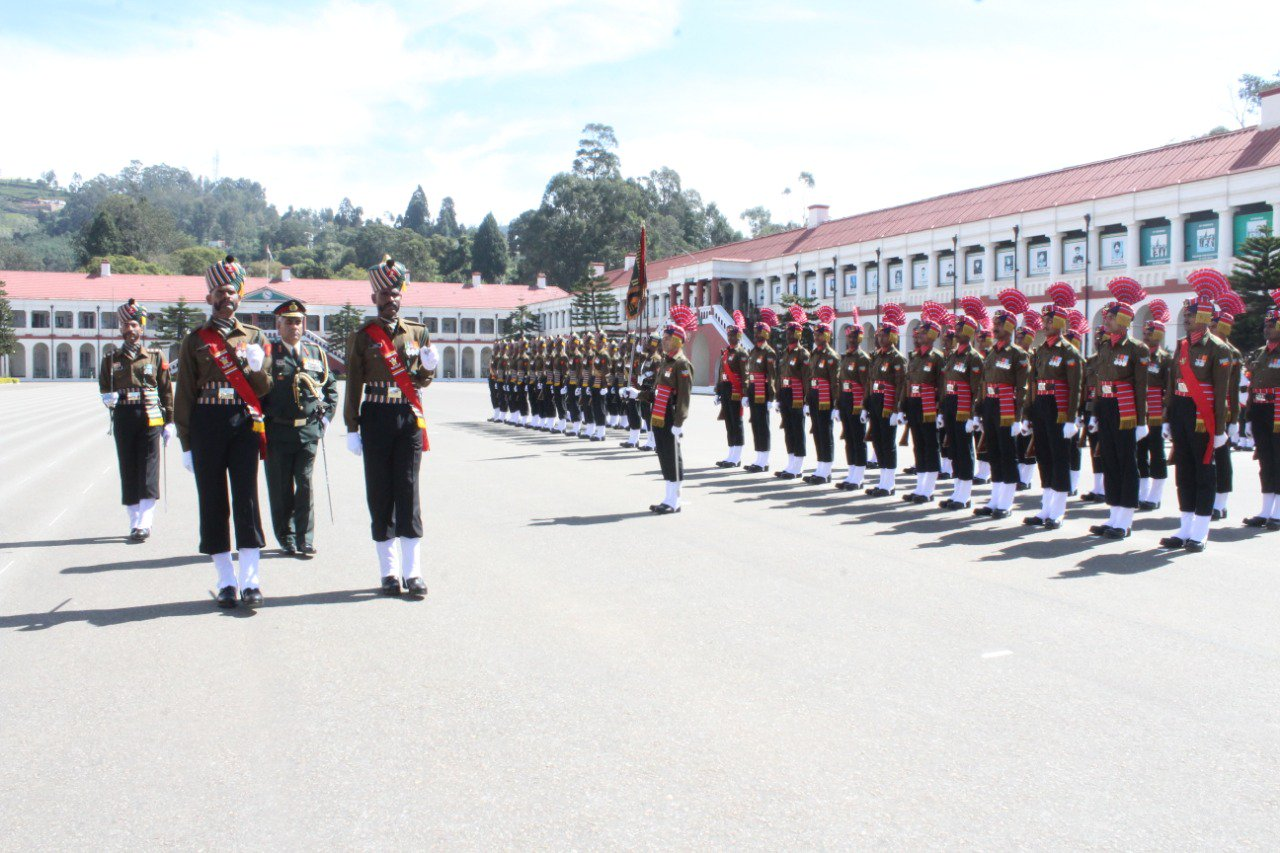
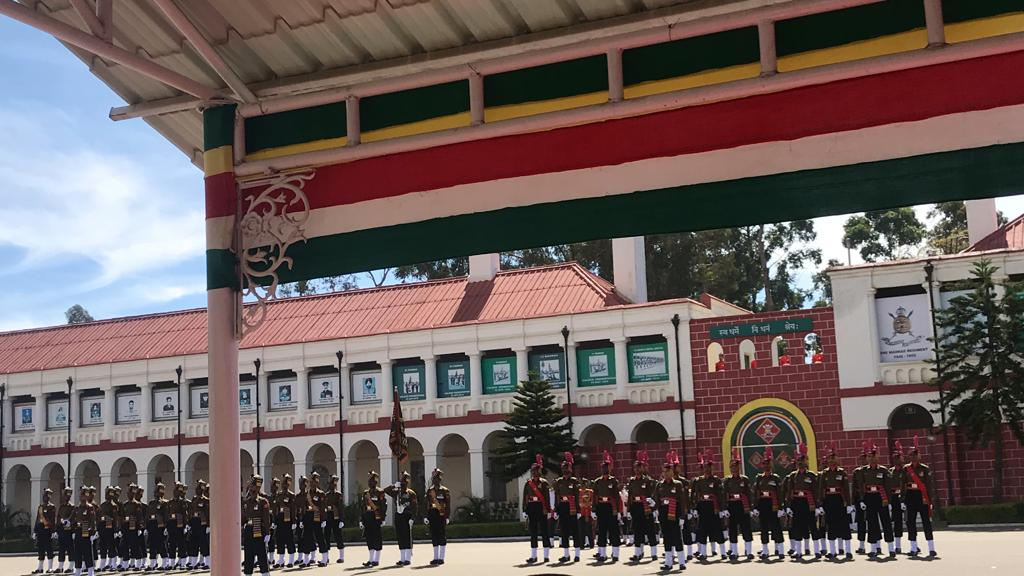
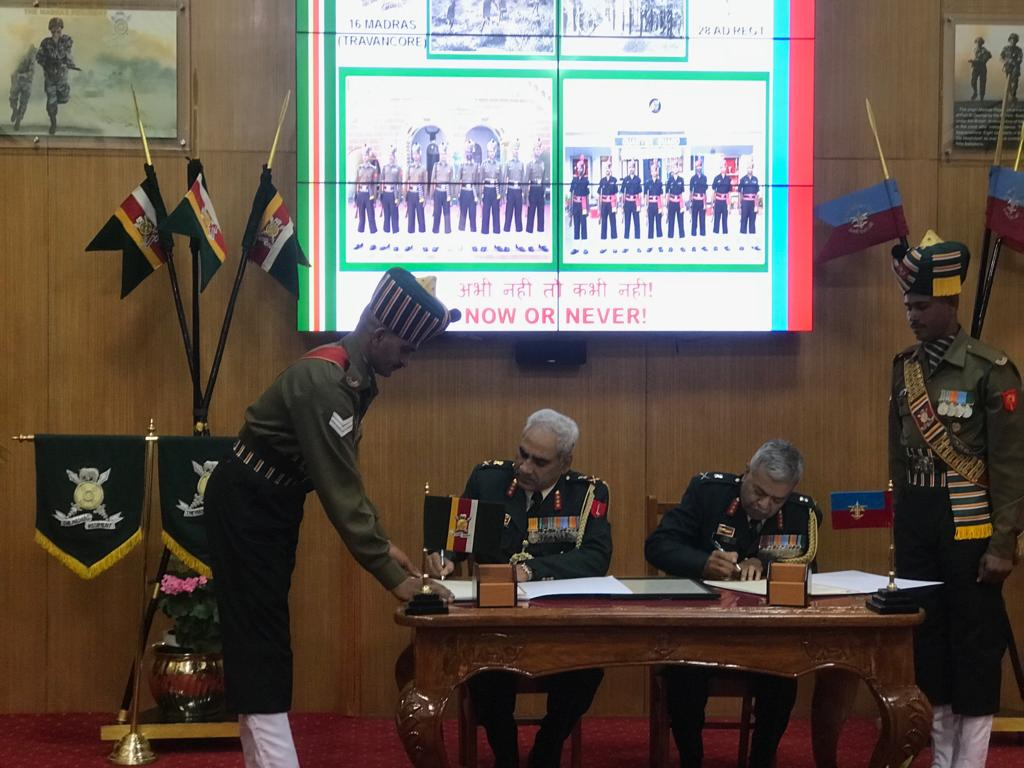

Other Operations -

- The regiment took part in rescue operations in Jhajjar during the 1977 floods in Haryana. For its role, the regiment received one Sena Medal, one Vishisht Seva Medal and four Chief of Army Staff Commendation Cards.
- Counter-insurgency operations – The regiment took part in Operation Rakshak in Punjab. On 21 September 1992, a noted leader of the terrorist group Khalistan Commando Force, Kulbinder Singh was killed. The regiment was awarded a Chief of Army Staff Commendation Card. It was deployed for counter insurgency operations in Jammu and Kashmir in early 2000s.
- While operating in the Northern Sector near the Line of Control, the regiment was responsible for destroying a Pakistani bunker on 23 August 2004, for which a GOC-in-C (Northern Command) Commendation Card was awarded.
- The regiment was deployed for air defence roles during Operation Shakti in 1988, Operation Vijay in 1999 and Operation Parakram between 2001 and 2002.

== Affiliation ==
The regiment was affiliated with the Madras Regiment in November 2018 at an official ceremony held at the Madras Regiment Centre at Wellington.

== Other achievements ==
- Havildar V Srinivasa was awarded the COAS Commendation Card in August 2016.
- Major Divyansh Singh and Naib Subedar Subodh Kumar were awarded Chief of Army Staff Commendation Cards in August 2025 for Operation Sindoor.
- The regiment celebrated the Diamond Jubilee of its formation in 2016.
