= 401 Light AD Regiment (Composite) =

401 Light Air Defence Regiment (Composite)
- Active: 1988 – present
- Country: India
- Allegiance: India
- Branch: Indian Army
- Type: Corps of Army Air Defence
- Size: Regiment
- Motto: आकाशे शत्रुन् जहि (Defeat the Enemy in the Sky)
- Colors: Sky Blue and Red

401 Light Air Defence Regiment (Composite) (401 Lt AD Regt (Comp)) is an Air Defence regiment of the Indian Army.

== Formation ==
401 Light AD Regiment (Composite) was raised at Madhopur on 1 June 1988 by Colonel RK Verma.

== History ==
At raising, the regiment was equipped with ZU-23-2B anti-aircraft twin-barreled autocannons as its main equipment. The unit became a composite regiment in 1992.

Locations

The regiment has varied tenures in high altitude, field, modified field, counter insurgency and peace stations at Udhampur, Nasirabad, Ferozepur, Leh, Siachen, Bangalore, Lalgarh Jattan, Pathankot, Gandhidham and Jodhpur.

Operations

The Regiment has participated in Operation Blackrose, Operation Rakshak I (Jammu and Kashmir), Operation Meghdoot, Operation Rakshak II (Punjab), Operation Dalunag, Operation Vijay and Operation Rakshak III.

The regiment was awarded the General Officer Commanding in Chief's (Northern Command) unit appreciation for its tenure in Siachen-Kargil sector between 1997 and 1999. The regiment has won 3 Sena Medals, 2 COAS Commendation Cards and 46 GOC-in-C Commendation Cards.

Naib Subedar Samuel Kantrang was awarded COAS Commendation Card in August 2025 and Captain Priya Yadav in August 2026.
