= 46 Air Defence Regiment (India) =

- Active: 1948 – present
- Country: India
- Allegiance: India
- Branch: Indian Army
- Type: Corps of Army Air Defence
- Size: Regiment
- Motto(s): Sanskrit: आकाशे शत्रुन् जहि English: Defeat the Enemy in the Sky
- Colors: Sky Blue and Red
- Equipment: Bofors L70 guns

Insignia
- Abbreviation: 46 AD Regt

46 Air Defence Regiment is part of the Corps of Army Air Defence of the Indian Army.

== Formation ==
46 Air Defence Regiment was raised in 1948. The regiment consists of 66, 67 and 68 air defence batteries. It is presently equipped with Bofors L70 guns.

== Operations ==
The regiment has taken part in the following operations-

- Indo-Pakistani War of 1971: The unit took part in Operation Cactus Lily in the eastern sector. It was equipped with Bofors 40 mm L/60 guns and was part of the 340 Mountain Brigade Group. Three troops were with 4 Corps Artillery Brigade and 33 Corps Artillery Brigade.

== Honours and achievements ==
- The Regiment was awarded Director General Army Air Defence Unit Appreciation award in 2005, 2007, 2013 and 2017.
- Captain Jaskarn Singh was awarded COAS Commendation Card in August 2025.
- Subedar Laltu Hazra, Naib Subedar Puspraj Prasad Mishra and Naik Jadeja Mayursinh Nirubha were awarded COAS Commendation Cards for Operation Sindoor.

== War cry ==
The war cry of the regiment is Char Chey Abhay Ajay (चार छह अभय अजय), which translates to Four Six Fearless and Invincible.
