= Indian Army Armoured Corps =

Armoured warfare arm of the Indian Army

- Crest of the Armoured Corps
- Active: 1941 - Present
- Country: India
- Branch: Indian Army
- Role: Armoured Corps
- Size: 67 Armoured regiments

The Indian Army Armoured Corps is one of the combat arms of the Indian Army. Tracing its origins from the first regiment formed in 1776, the present corps was formed in 1947 from two-thirds of the personnel and assets of the British Indian Army's Indian Armoured Corps. It currently consists of 67 armoured regiments, including the President's Bodyguard.

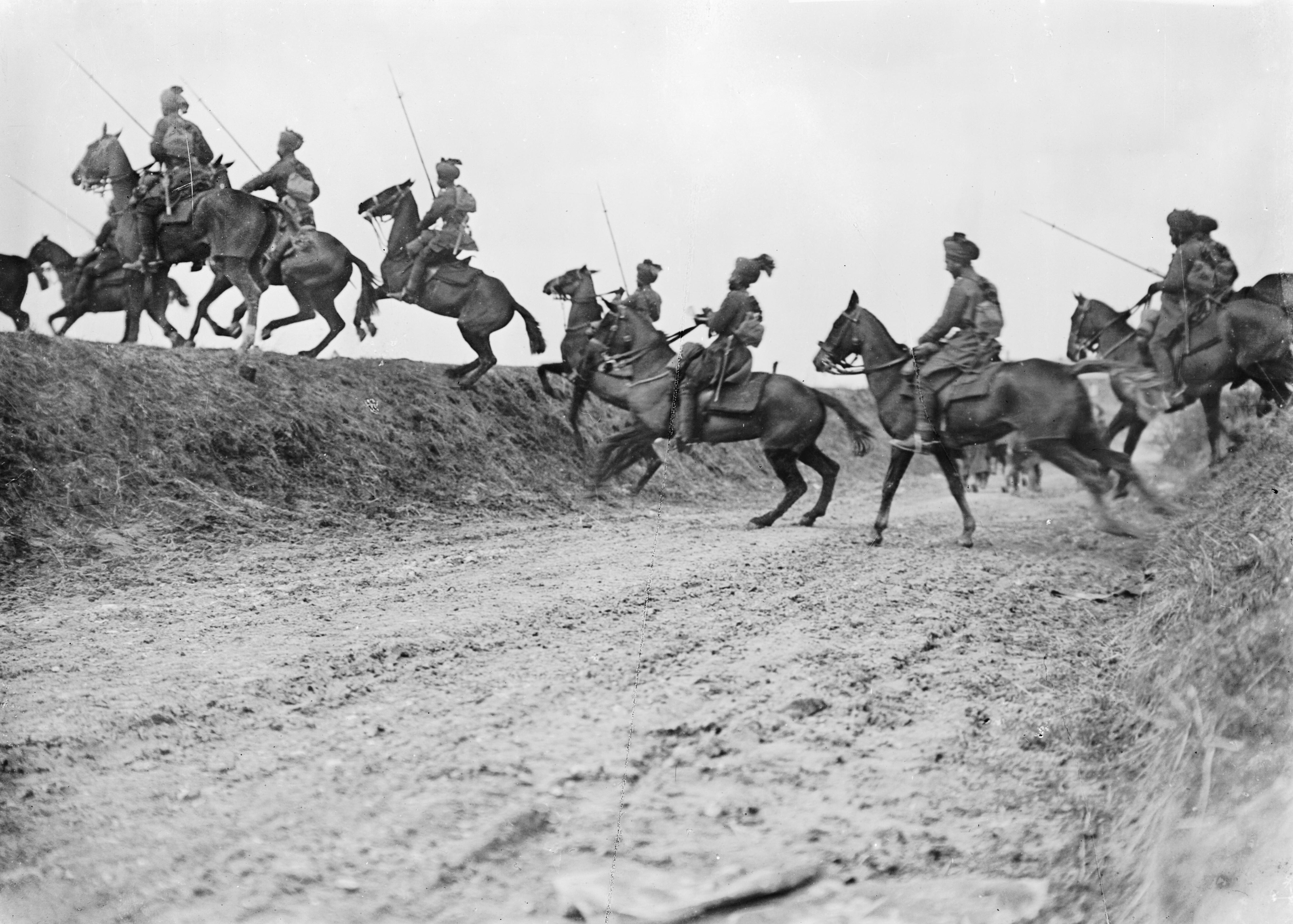
9th Hodson's Horse (Bengal Lancers), Indian Army, near Vraignes, France, April 1917.

== Centre and School ==
The Armoured Corps Centre and School (ACC&S) is located in Ahmednagar (now Ahilya Nagar), Maharashtra. In 1921, six Armoured Car companies arrived and in 1924 the Royal Tank Corps School was established at Ahmednagar to train the personnel of the Royal Tank Corps. This school was the forerunner of the Fighting Vehicle School, which began to impart driving & maintenance training. The Fighting Vehicle School along with the Machine Gun School, the training regiments, the recruit training centre, Armoured Corps Depot and Armoured Corps Records were amalgamated to form the present school and centre in 1948.

== Armour Day ==
The Armoured Corps of Indian Army celebrates 'Armour Day' on 1 May. It was on this day in 1938 that Scinde Horse became the first regiment to dismount from their horses and move to tanks. The first equipment inducted were Vickers Light Tanks and Chevrolet Armoured Cars.

== Naming Convention of the Armoured Regiments ==
The naming of the regiments reflects its historical origins. The terms Cavalry, Horse and Lancers, which have been dispensed with in the case of units raised post-independence, are historical legacies from the raising and renaming of these units when part of the East India Company's army and/or later the British Indian Army.

== Composition of an Armoured Regiment ==
An armoured corps regiment is commanded by a Colonel ranked officer, who is known as the Commandant of the Unit. An armoured regiment comprises 3 Sabre Squadrons and a Headquarter Squadron. Each squadron is commanded by a Major ranked officer. He holds the appointment of a Squadron Commander.

An Armoured Regiment has around 45 to 50 tanks in all. Each Sabre Squadron consists of 14-15 tanks and one Armoured Recovery Vehicle. 3 tanks are assigned to the Headquarter Squadron, including that of the commandant. Each squadron consists of four troops, each consisting of 3 tanks.

== Black Beret ==
The officers and troops of Armoured Corps regiments wear the Black Berets as opposed to the rifle green and blue coloured berets which are worn by the regiments of other arms and services respectively. The Black Beret gives the Tankman a distinct identity of their own within the Army fold.

== Equipment ==
The Armoured Corps of the Indian Army is currently equipped with the following tanks-

- Arjun MBT – Mk.1 variant in use and Mk.1A under order.
- T-90 – M and S variants with DRDO made upgrades.
- T-72 – M1 variant with upgrades namely Ajeya MK1/MK2 and Combat Improved Ajeya.
Arjun MK1 firing on the move at Pokaran Field Firing Range.

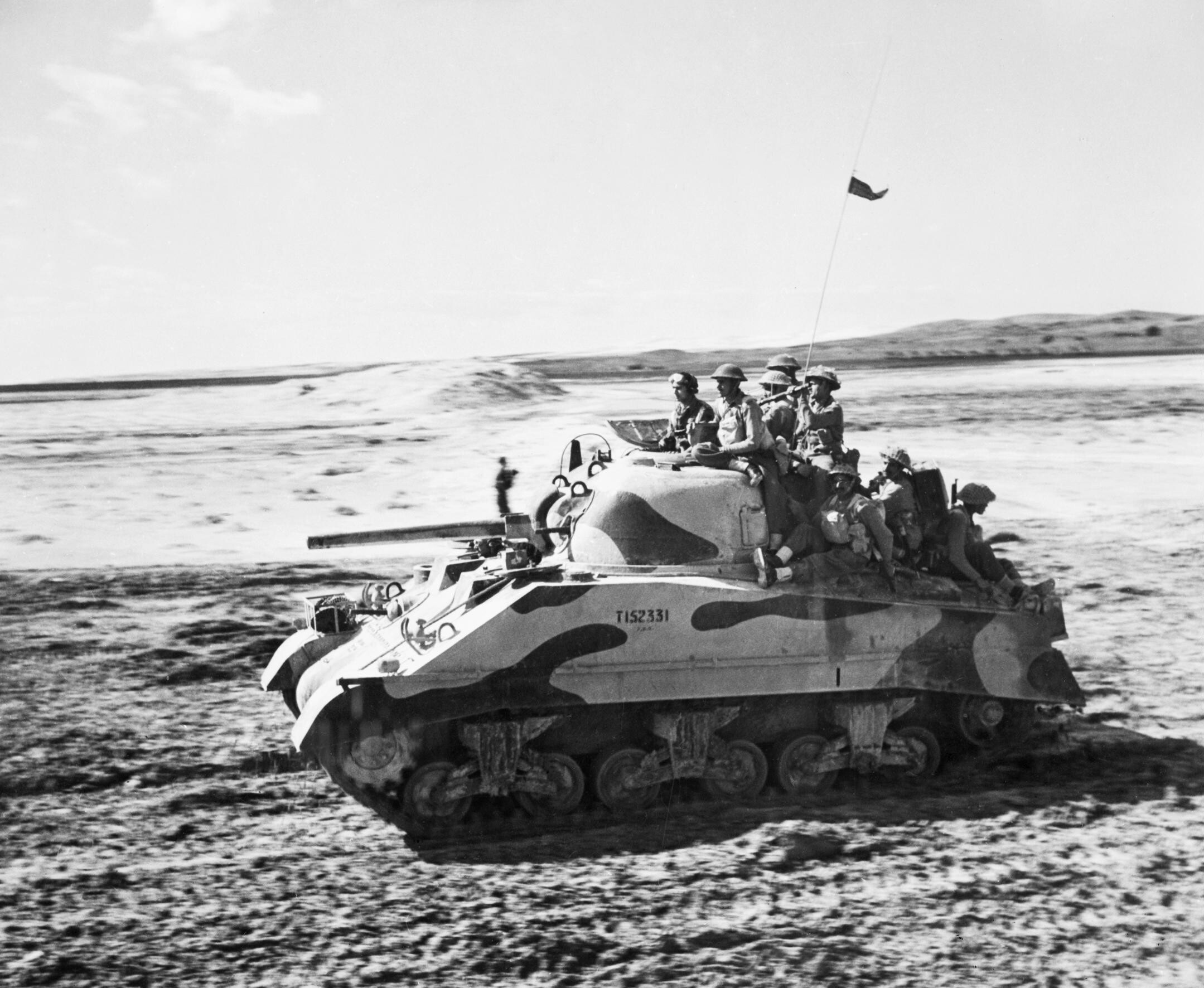
Indian Armoured Corps in a Sherman III tank in the Middle East, March 1944.

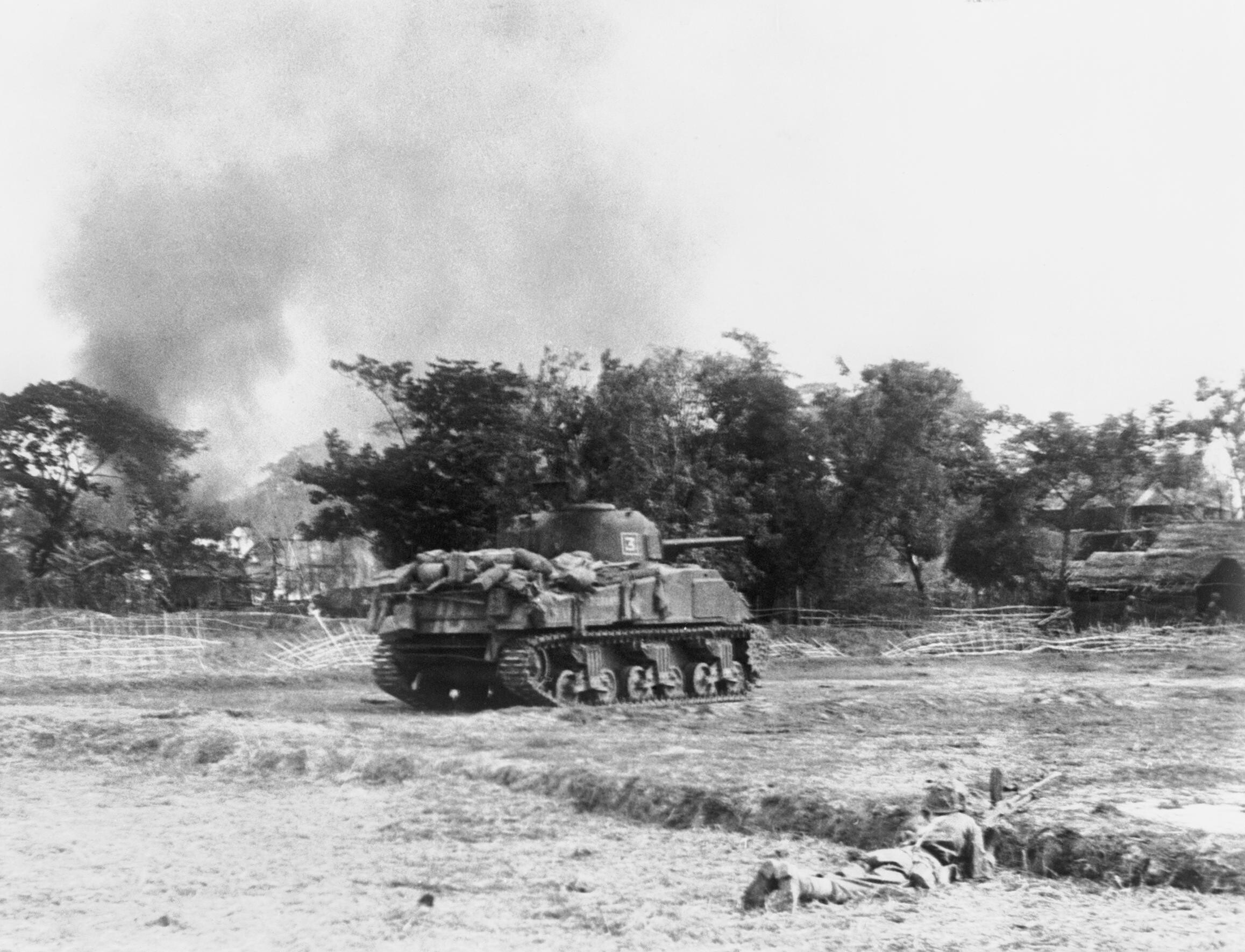
A Sherman tank of the Indian Armoured Corps on the road to Rangoon, Burma Campaign.

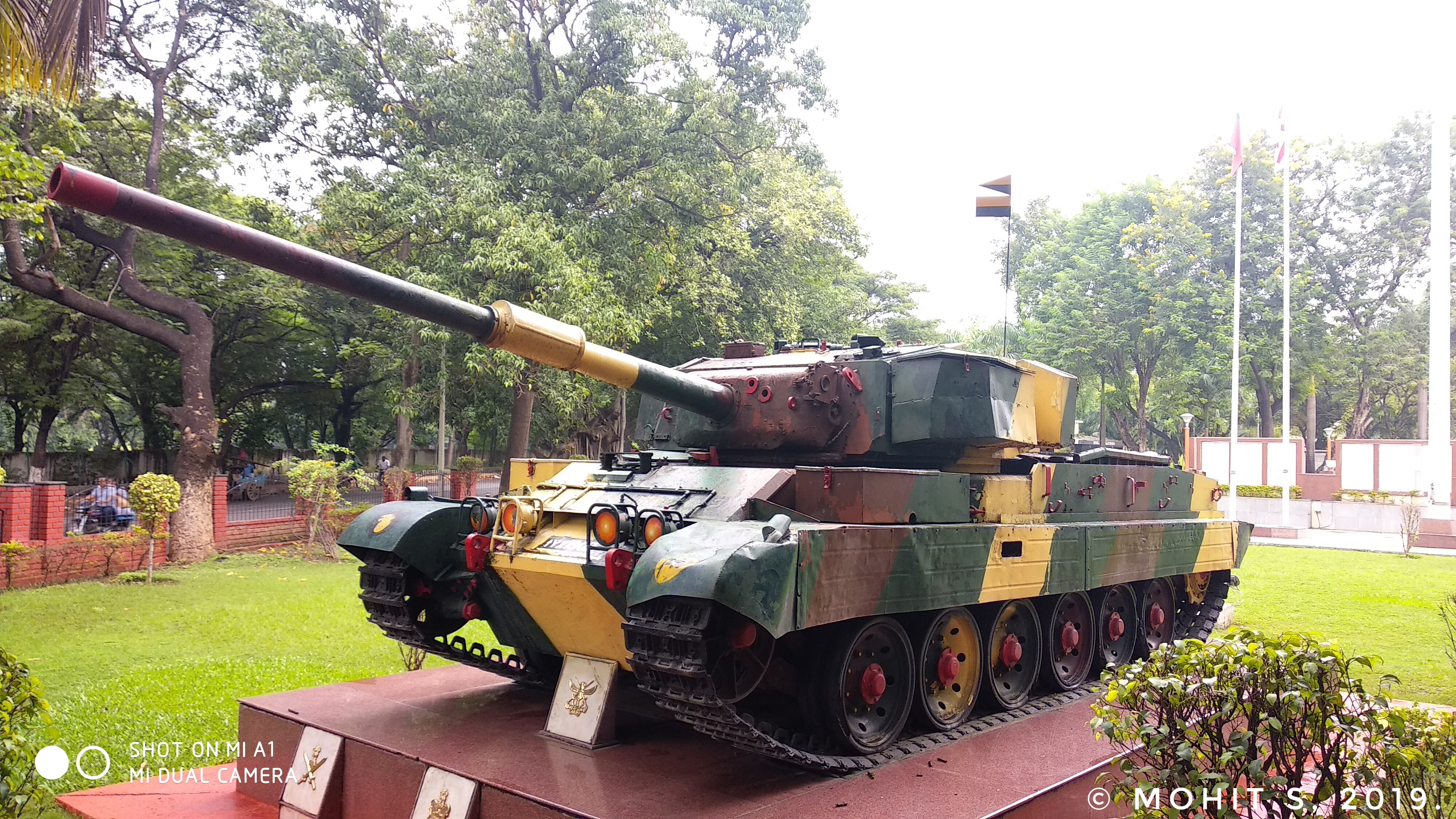
The Vijayanta - main battle tank of the Indian Army between 1965 and the early 2000s.

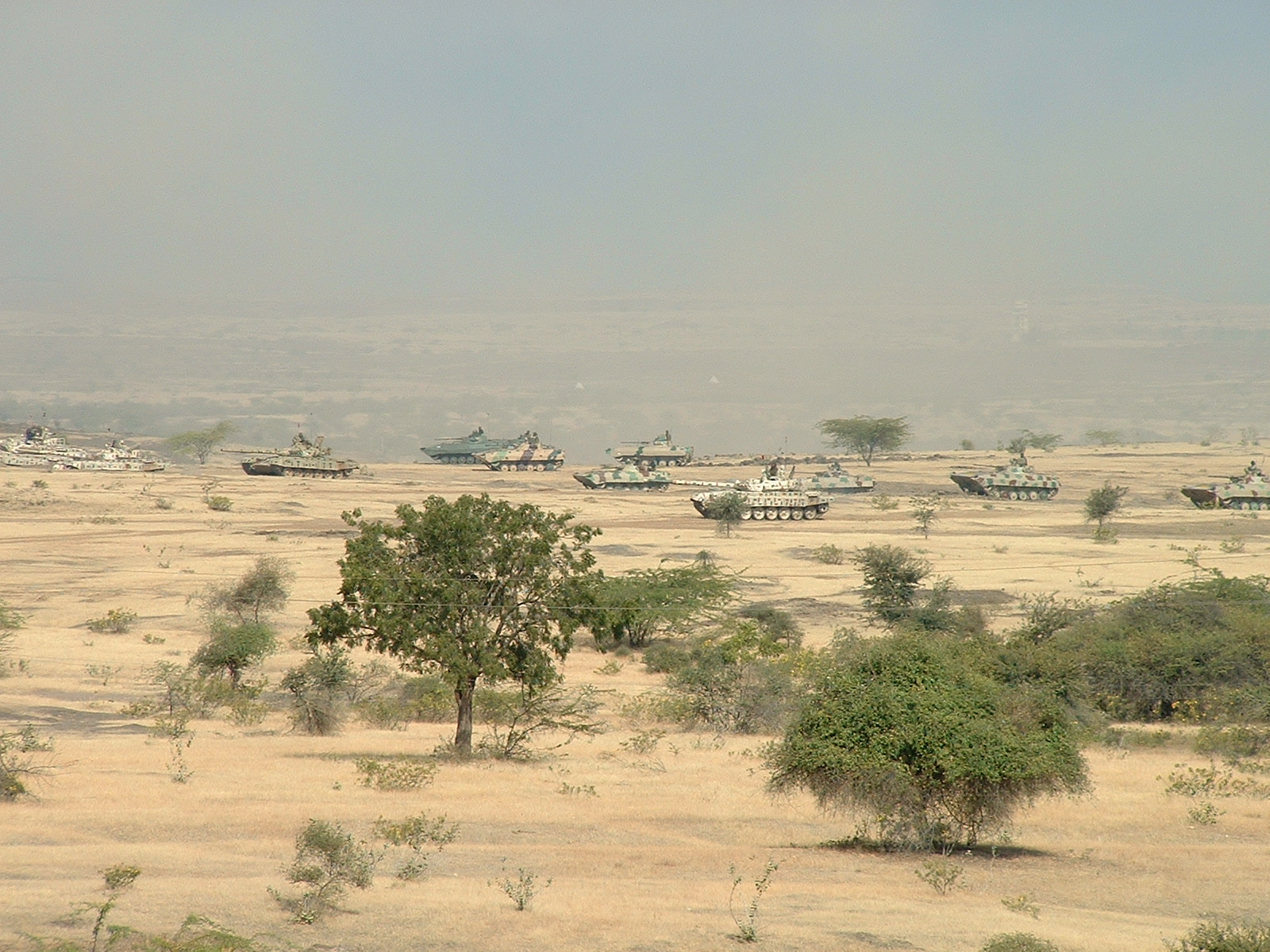
Tanks of the Indian Army Armoured Corps and BMP-2 IFVs during a training exercise in 2006.

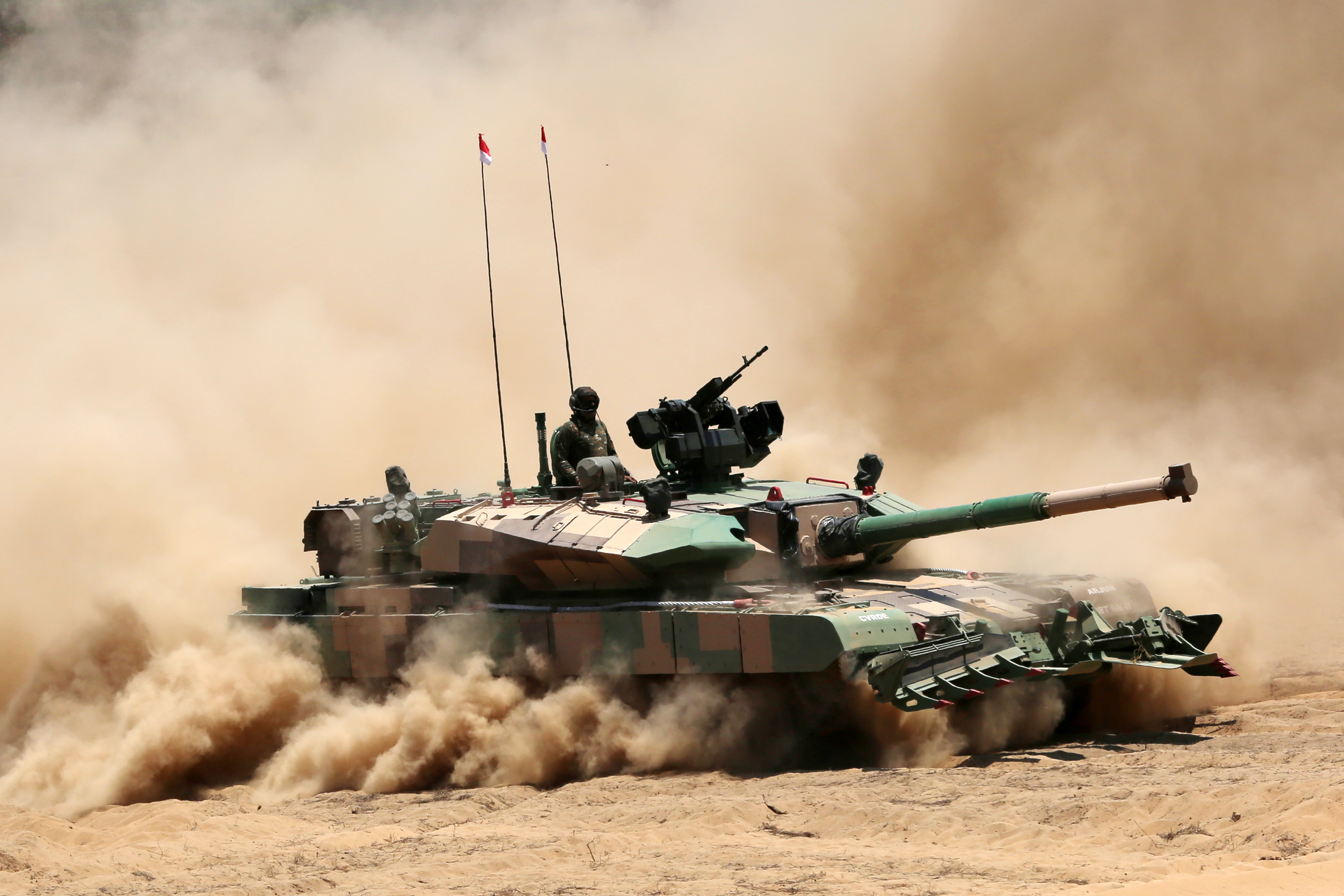
MBT Arjun MK1A

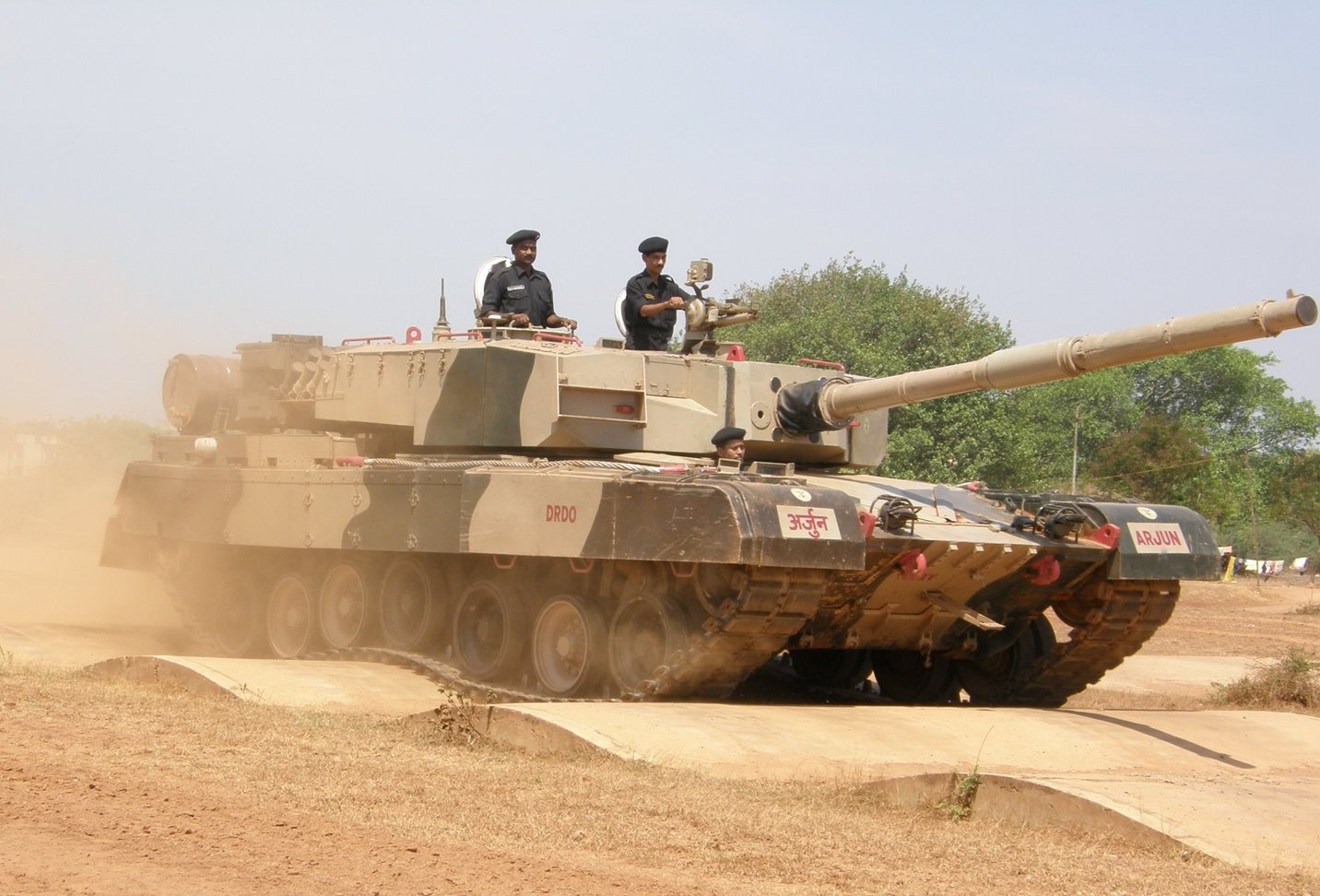
MBT Arjun MK1

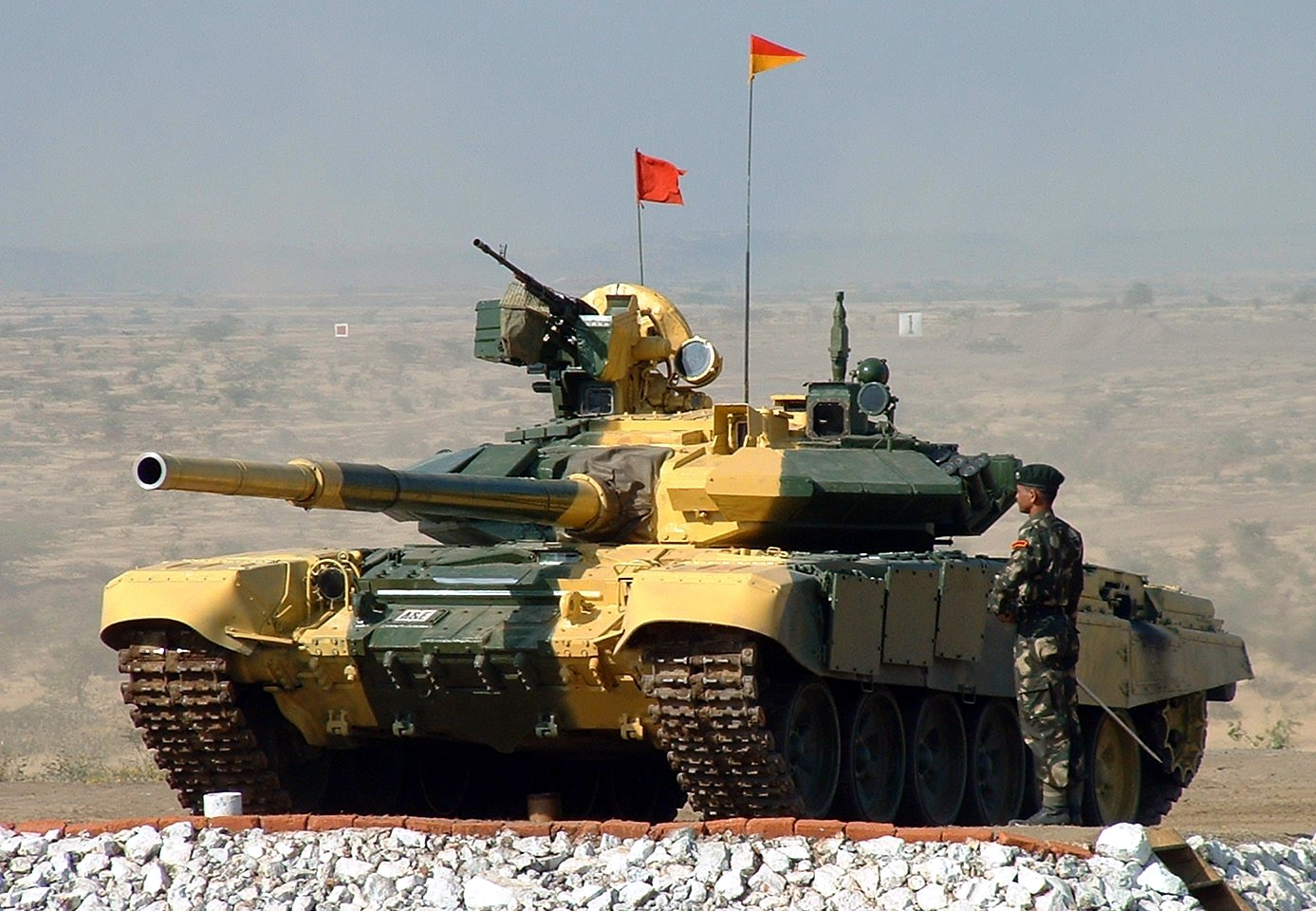
T-90 tank

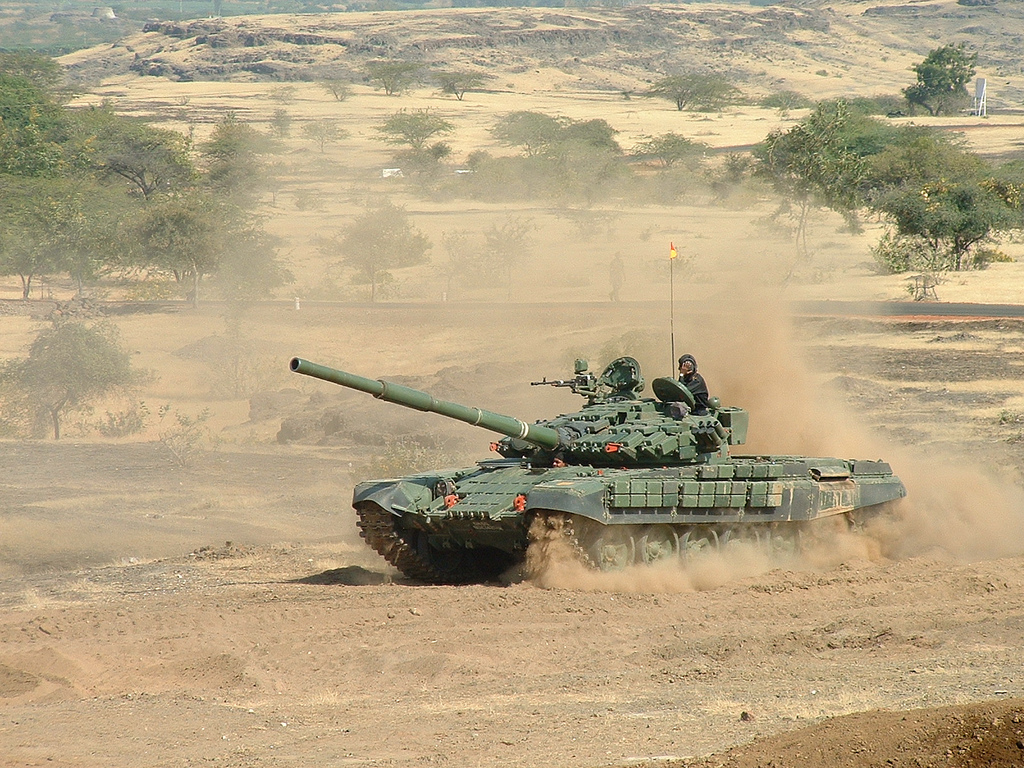
T-72 tank

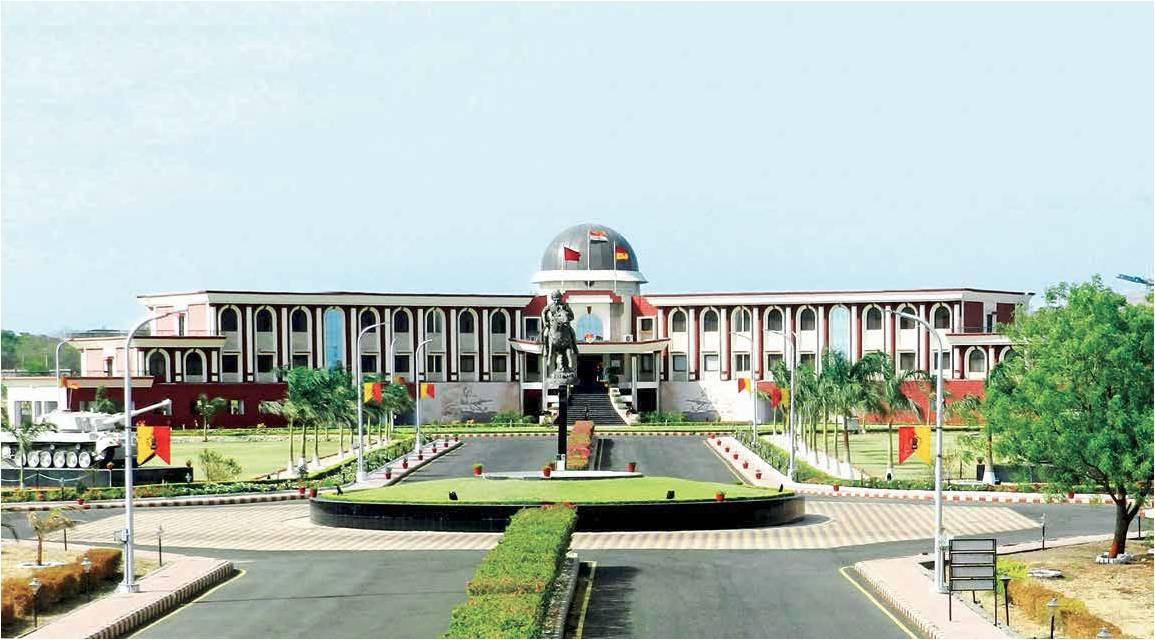
Armoured Corps Centre and School, Ahmednagar

== List of regiments ==
The list of regiments forming part of the Armoured Corps of the Indian Army is as follows. This list is as per unit serial number but not as per the order of precedence of the Indian Army. In that list, The President's Bodyguard is first, but is followed by 16 Light Cavalry, 7 Light Cavalry, 8 Cavalry and 1st Horse. As a matter of tradition, each Armoured Regiment has its own "Colonel of the Regiment", an honorary post for a senior officer who oversees the regimental issues concerning the unit.

Name	Other Name(s)	Raising Date	Raising Commander	Raising Location	References and notes	Tank
President's Bodyguard	Rashtrapati Angrakshak	1773	Warren Hastings			Horse
1st Horse	Skinner's Horse, The Yellow Boys	23 February 1803	Col James Skinner	Hansi		T-72
2nd Lancers	Gardner's Horse	1809	Lt Col William Gardner	Farrukhabad, Mainpuri		T-72
3rd Cavalry		1822				T-72
4th Horse	Hodson's Horse, Flamingoes	1857	Bvt Maj WSR Hodson	Punjab		T-72
5th Armoured Regiment**		1 December 1983	Lt Col JPS Hanspal	Jodhpur		T-90
6th Lancers***		1 February 1984	Lt Col RS Deol, SM	Nabha		T-90
7th Light Cavalry	3rd Madras Lancers, 28th Light Cavalry	1784				T-72
8th Light Cavalry	Gordon's Horse	23 October 1787	Maj Henry Darley	Arcot		T-72
9th Horse	The Deccan Horse	1790				
10th Armoured Regiment		16 April 1984	Lt Col Kulwant Singh	Ahmednagar		T-72
11th Armoured Regiment	The Double First, Sprocket Power Risala	7 May 1984	Lt Col Harjeet Singh Lamba	Kaluchak		
12th Armoured Regiment	Barsinghas	1 October 1984	Lt Col LR Vaid	Kapurthala		T-90
13th Armoured Regiment	Triskaideca, Nightstrikers	21 December 1984	Lt Col Balram Singh Mehta	Ahmednagar		T-90
14th Horse	The Scinde Horse, Jacob's Horse	8 August 1839	Capt W Ward	Hyderabad, Sindh		T-90
15th Armoured Regiment		1 March 1985	Lt Col MD Law	Mamun		T-90
16th Light Cavalry	3rd Madras Light Cavalry, 27 Light Cavalry, The Carnatic Warriors	1776	Lt Col J D Stevenson	Arcot		T-72
17th Horse	The Poona Horse, Fakr-e-Hind	15 July 1817	Lt Col J Cunningham	Sirur		T-72
18th Cavalry		31 January 1842				T-72
19th Armoured Regiment	Invincibles	25 March 1985		Ahmednagar		T-90
20th Lancers		1857/1858; Re-raised 10 July 1956	Lt Col Umrao Singh	Ahmednagar		T-72
21st Horse	Central India Horse, Mayne's Horse, Beatson's Horse	1857	Capt Henry Otway Mayne			
41st Armoured Regiment		1 July 1980	Lt Col JP Singh	Ahmednagar		T-72
42nd Armoured Regiment		1 January 1981	Lt Col Ranjit Talwar	Babina		T-90
43rd Armoured Regiment	Charioteers	1981	Lt Col BM Kapur	Ahmednagar		Arjun Mk1
44th Armoured Regiment		15 December 1981	Lt Col DS Dhillon	Ahmednagar		T-72
45th Cavalry	Paintalis Risala	16 May 1965	Lt Col SK Candade	New Delhi		T-90
46th Armoured Regiment	Thunderbolts	1 July 1982	Lt Col Prithpal Singh Sandhu	Ahmednagar		T-72
47th Armoured Regiment	Penetrators	15 November 1982	Lt Col Tejvir Singh Sirohi	Babina		T-72
48th Armoured Regiment		1 December 1982	Lt Col DS Dhadwal	Meerut		T-90
49th Armoured Regiment		1 October 1983	Lt Col JPS Nakai	Ahmednagar		T-72
50 Armoured Regiment	Fear Naught	July 1989	Lt Col AK Bhatia	Ahmednagar		T-72
51 Armoured Regiment	The Unicorn	15 July 1989	Lt Col RS Gill			T-72
52 Armoured Regiment		1 February 1994	Col Jugvir Singh	Roorkee		T-72
53 Armoured Regiment	Falcons	1 April 2002	Col KJ Singh	Desert sector (in field)		
54 Armoured Regiment	Ironhides	1 July 2010	Col Navneet Narayan			T-90
55 Armoured Regiment				Ahilyanagar		T-90
56 Armoured Regiment	Lionhearts	1 October 2011	Col Anuj Kalia	Ahilyanagar		T-90
57 Armoured Regiment						
58 Armoured Regiment	Awwal Atthawan, The Patiala Risala	1 October 2014		Patiala		T-90
59 Armoured Regiment						
60 Armoured Regiment	Panthers	2019		Ahmednagar		T-90
61 Cavalry		1 October 1953	Lt Col Phulel Singh	Gwalior		Horse
62 Cavalry		31 March 1957	Lt Col RS Butalia	Ambala		T-72
63 Cavalry	Tresath	2 January 1957	Lt Col Harmandar Singh	Alwar		T-72
64 Cavalry		31 March 1966	Lt Col Trevor Lancelot Perry	Babina		
65 Armoured Regiment		1 September 1966	Lt Col KK Kaul	Ahmednagar		T-72
66 Armoured Regiment		1 September 1966	Lt Col Narinder Singh	Ahmednagar		T-72
67 Armoured Regiment		15 September 1967	Lt Col Niranjan Singh Cheema	Ahmednagar		T-72
68 Armoured Regiment	Gladiators	1 March 1968	Lt Col RN Thumby	Ahmednagar		T-72
69 Armoured Regiment		1 October 1968		Ahmednagar		T-72
70 Armoured Regiment		11 February 1968	Lt Col R Christian	Ahmednagar	Raised as 70 Guided Missile Regiment	T-90
71 Armoured Regiment		1 January 1971	Lt Col BS Chimni	Ahmednagar		T-90
72 Armoured Regiment	The Chhamb Knights, The Little Giants	1 July 1971	Lt Col Inderjit Chopra	Ahmednagar	Youngest armoured regiment of the Indian army to be blooded in war.	T-90
73 Armoured Regiment	The Desert Rats	3 December 1971	Lt Col KM Dhody	Ahmednagar		T-90
74 Armoured Regiment	Desert Hawks	1 June 1972	Lt Col KS Khajuria	Ahmednagar		T-90
75 Armoured Regiment		12 March 1972	Lt Col Vijai Singh	Sakna	Only regiment to be raised on foreign soil	Arjun Mk1
76 Armoured Regiment		21 March 1985		Ahmednagar		T-72
77 Armoured Regiment		1 February 2021		Ahmednagar		
81 Armoured Regiment		1 October 1973				
82 Armoured Regiment	Toofan-e-Hind	1 October 1975	Lt Col Moti Lal Dhar			T-72
83 Armoured Regiment	83 Kavachit Risala / One for al l- All for one	1 January 1976	Lt Col Ashok Johar	Ahmednagar		T-90
84 Armoured Regiment		1 July 1976	Lt Col Tarif Singh Dhiyia	Ahmednagar		T-72
85 Armoured Regiment		1 October 1976	Lt Col DP Singh	Ahmednagar		T-72
86 Armoured Regiment	Chhiassi	1 March 1977	Lt Col NS Malik	Ahmednagar		T-90
87 Armoured Regiment	Lightning Streaks Regiment	1 July 1979	Lt Col DD Singh	Ahmednagar		T-72
88 Armoured Regiment		September 1979	Lt Col Iesh Rikhy	Ahmednagar		T-72
89 Armoured Regiment		1 February 1980	Lt Col KL Bakshi	Ahmednagar		T-72
90 Armoured Regiment		15 August 1979	Lt Col Manjit Singh Sawhney	Pawan Da Chak		

** The original 5th Horse (Probyn's Horse) was transferred to Pakistan in 1947.

*** Original 6th Lancers (Watson's Horse) was transferred to Pakistan in 1947.
