= 88th Armoured Regiment (India) =

Indian Army regiment

88 Armoured Regiment
- Active: 1979–present
- Country: India
- Allegiance: India
- Branch: Indian Army
- Type: Armoured Corps
- Size: Regiment
- Mottos: अभय है, अजय है (Abhay Hai, Ajeya Hai); Fearless and Invincible
- Equipment: T-72 tanks

Commanders
- Colonel of the Regiment: Lieutenant General Devendra Sharma

Insignia
- Abbreviation: 88 Armd Regt

88 Armoured Regiment is an armoured regiment of the Indian Army.

== History ==
The regiment was raised in September 1979 at Ahmednagar. The first commandant was Lieutenant Colonel (later Brigadier) Iesh Rikhy. The regiment was initially equipped with Vijayanta tanks and later converted to T-72 tanks. It has an all-India, all-class composition, drawing troops from various castes and religions. Brigadier Satish Kumar is the current Colonel of the Regiment.

== Gallantry awards and honours ==
The regiment has won the following awards –

- COAS Commendation Cards – 3
- The regiment with its Vijayanta tanks took part in the Republic Day parade in 1990.
