= 53rd Armoured Regiment (India) =

Indian Army regiment

53 Armoured Regiment
- Active: 2002 – present
- Country: India
- Allegiance: India
- Branch: Indian Army
- Type: Armoured Corps
- Size: Regiment

Commanders
- Colonel of the Regiment: Lieutenant General Vivek Kashyap

Insignia
- Abbreviation: 53 Armd Regt

53 Armoured Regiment is an armoured regiment of the Indian Army Armoured Corps.

== Formation ==
The regiment was raised on 1 April 2002 during Operation Parakram in the field, in the desert sector of India's Western border. The first commanding officer was Colonel KJ Singh and Lieutenant General GD Singh was the first Colonel of the Regiment. Lieutenant General Karanbir Singh Brar, then Director General Armoured Corps, the third CO, became the Colonel of the Regiment as well.

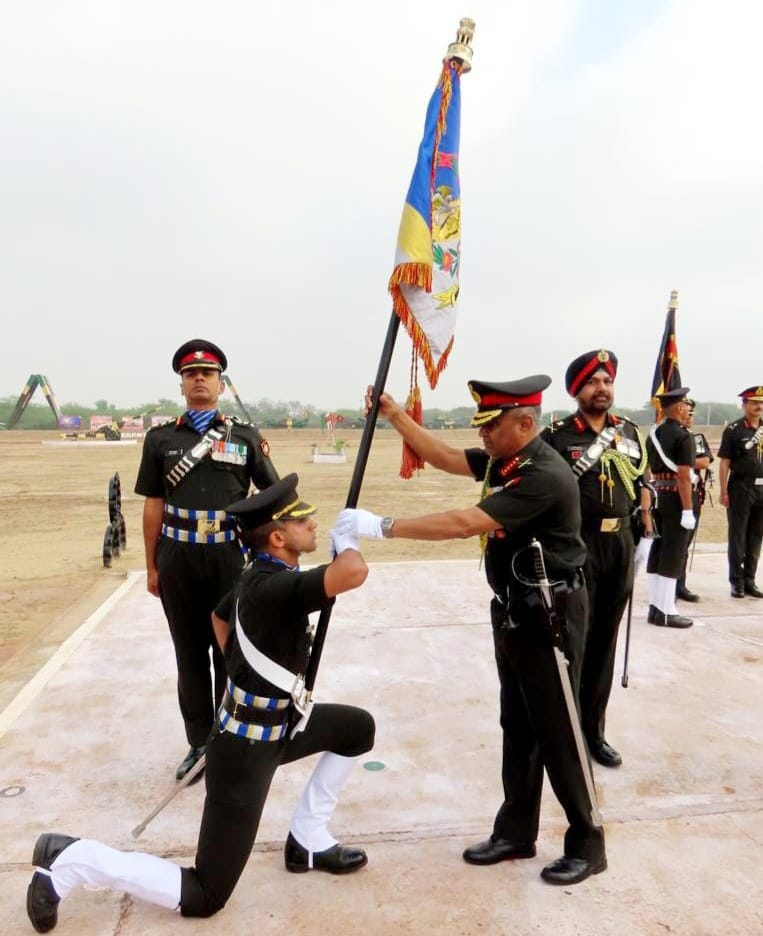
General Manoj Pande, COAS, presenting the prestigious ‘President’s Standards’ to 53 Armoured Regiment

== President's Standards ==
The Chief of Army Staff, General Manoj Pande presented the President's Standards to the regiment at Suratgarh military station on 25 March 2023.

== Gallantry awards ==
The regiment has won the following gallantry awards -

- Sena Medal - Dafadar Bhagwat Prasad Yadav
- COAS Commendation Cards - 2
