= 44th Armoured Regiment (India) =

Indian Army regiment

44 Armoured Regiment
- Active: 1981–present
- Country: India
- Allegiance: India
- Branch: Indian Army
- Type: Armoured Corps
- Size: Regiment
- Nickname: "The Roaring Fours"
- Mottos: युध्यस्व जेतासि रणे "Yudhyasva Jetasi Rane" (Fight, and Victory shall be yours)
- Colors: Red and Gold
- Equipment: T-72

Commanders
- Colonel of the Regiment: Lieutenant General Vipul Singhal

Insignia
- Abbreviation: 44 Armd Regt

44 Armoured Regiment is an armoured regiment of the Indian Army.

== Formation ==
44 Armoured Regiment was raised on 15 December 1981 at Ahmednagar under the command of Lieutenant Colonel (later Brigadier) DS Dhillon based on a ‘mixed class composition’ and equipped with Vijayanta tanks. Major General (later General) BC Joshi was the first Colonel of the Regiment.

== History ==
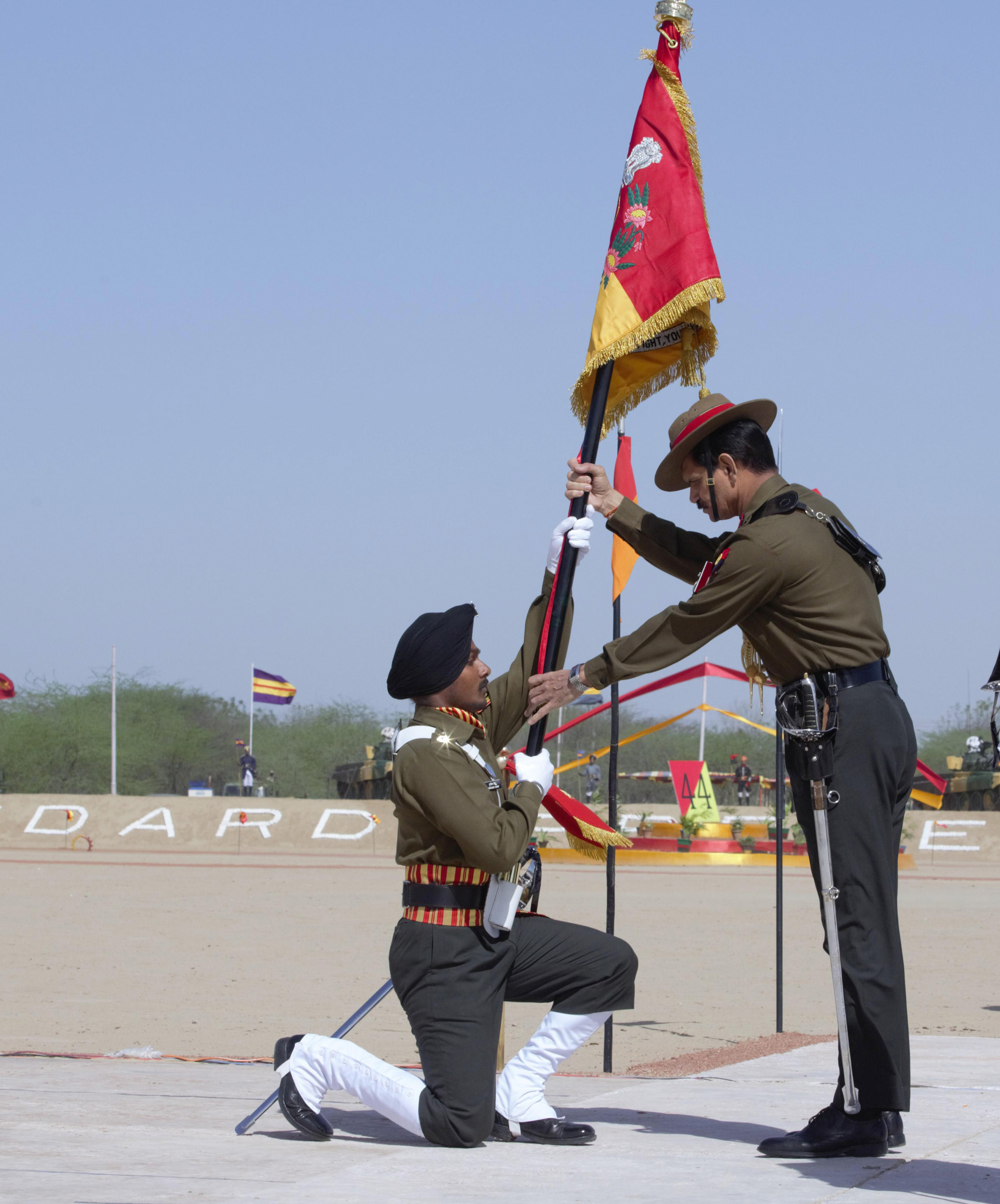
The Chief of Army Staff, General Dalbir Singh presenting the President's ‘Standard’ to 44 Armoured Regiment, at Suratgarh, in Rajasthan on February 25, 2015

The Regiment was presented the ‘President’s Standards’ at Suratgarh on 25 February 2015 by General Dalbir Singh, Chief of the Army Staff, on behalf of the President of India, Mr Pranab Mukherjee.

== Equipment ==
The Regiment had the Vijayanta tanks at the time of raising. It converted to T-72M1-Ajeya tanks in 1997.

== Operations ==
The regiment has participated in Operation Meghdoot, Operation Rakshak and Operation Parakram. It has contributed its officers and men to Rashtriya Rifles and Assam Rifles for counter-insurgency duties.

The Regiment has won the following awards for gallantry and distinguished service – 2 Vishisht Seva Medals, 1 Uttam Jeevan Raksha Padak, 23 Chief of Army Staff Commendation Cards, 6 Vice Chief of Army Staff Commendation Cards, 20 GOC-in-C Commendation Cards and 1 UN Force Commander Commendation.

== Regimental Insignia ==
The Regimental insignia consists of crossed lances with pennons of the regimental colours. The numeral "44" is inscribed on the crossing of the lances inside a circle, mounted with the "mailed fist" or gauntlet. There is a scroll at the base with the Regimental Motto in Devanagari script. The shoulder title consists of the numeral "44" in brass.

The colours of the Regiment are Red and Gold – which are the same as the colours of the Indian Armoured Corps.

The Regimental motto is युध्यस्व जेतासि रणे (Yudhyasva Jetasi Rane), which has been taken from the Bhagavad Gita (Chapter 11, Shloka 34). It translates to "Fight, and Victory shall be yours".
