= 82nd Armoured Regiment =

Indian Army regiment

82 Armoured Regiment
- Active: 1975–present
- Country: India
- Allegiance: India
- Branch: Indian Army
- Type: Armoured Corps
- Size: Regiment
- Nickname: Toofan-e-hind
- Equipment: T-72 tanks

Commanders
- Colonel of the Regiment: General Dhiraj Seth

Insignia
- Abbreviation: 82 Armd Regt

82 Armoured Regiment is an armoured regiment of the Indian Army.

== History ==
The regiment was raised on 1 October 1975. The first commandant was Lieutenant Colonel (later Lieutenant General) Moti Dar of the Poona Horse. It has an all-India, all-class composition, drawing troops from various castes and religions.

Lieutenant General Dhiraj Seth is the current Colonel of the Regiment.

== Gallantry awards and honours ==
The regiment has won the following gallantry awards –

- Shaurya Chakra - 03
  - Major Ganesh Madappa – awarded posthumously for his bravery, while in service with the 36 RR battalion at Budgam district of Jammu and Kashmir, during counter-insurgency operations.
  - Sowar Kalu Ram Jat
  - One more SC awardee for service in CI/ CT ops.
- Sena Medal (Gallantry) - 3
- COAS Commendation Cards – 2
  - Lieutenant Colonel Arjun Ram Singh
  - Risaldar Major Surinder Kumar
- VCOAS Commendation Card – 1
- Risaldar Major (Honorary Captain) Amar Singh was appointed Honorary Life Aide-de-camp to the President of India on 5 April 1980.

== Regimental Insignia ==
The cap badge of the regiment consists of a winged lion and a scroll at the base with the Regimental Motto in Devanagari script.
