= 49th Armoured Regiment (India) =

Indian army regiment

49 Armoured Regiment
- Active: 1983 – present
- Country: India
- Allegiance: India
- Branch: Indian Army
- Type: Armoured Corps
- Size: Regiment

Commanders
- Colonel of the Regiment: Lieutenant General Mohit Malhotra

Insignia
- Abbreviation: 49 Armd Regt

49 Armoured Regiment is an armoured regiment of the Indian Army.

== Formation ==
The regiment was raised on 1 October 1983 under the command of Lieutenant Colonel JPS Nakai at Ahmednagar. It has an all-India, all-class composition, drawing troops from various castes and religions. Lieutenant General SS Mahal, VSM is the current Colonel of the Regiment.

== President's Standards ==
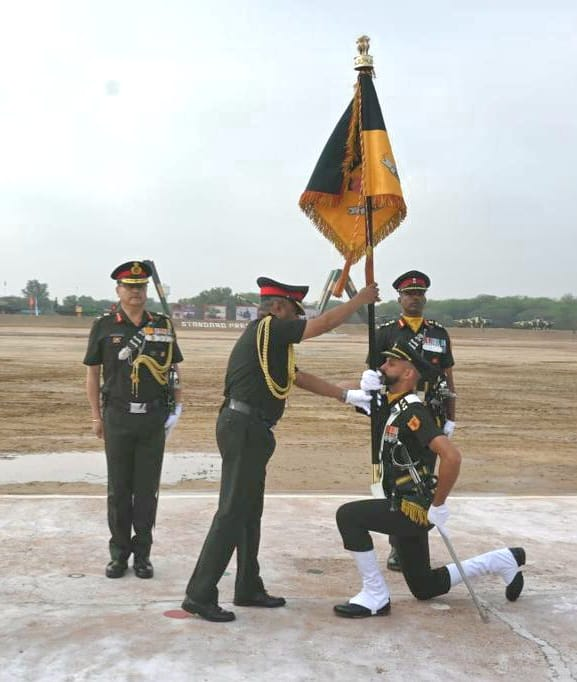
General Manoj Pande, COAS, presenting the prestigious ‘President’s Standards’ to 49 Armoured Regiment

The Chief of Army Staff, General Manoj Pande presented the President's Standards to the regiment at Suratgarh military station on 25 March 2023.

== Gallantry awards ==
The regiment has won the following gallantry awards -

- Sena Medal - Major Amit Rathi

== Other achievements ==
Sowar Pradeep Kumar of the regiment won a Silver Medal in the Free Rifle 300 Metres (Three Position) event at the 26th All India GV Mavalankar Shooting Championship.

== Regimental insignia ==
The Regimental insignia consists of crossed lances with pennons mounted with the Lion Capital of Ashoka, with the numeral "49" inscribed on the crossing of the lances and a scroll at the base with the words "ARMOURED REGIMENT".
