= 48th Armoured Regiment (India) =

Indian Army regiment

48 Armoured Regiment
- Active: 1982 – present
- Country: India
- Allegiance: India
- Branch: Indian Army
- Type: Armoured Corps
- Size: Regiment
- Nickname: Tridents
- Mottos: सम्मान या बलिदान "Samaan Ya Balidan" ("Honour or Sacrifice")
- Colors: Red, Green, Yellow and Blue
- Anniversaries: 1 December
- Equipment: T-90 tanks

Commanders
- Colonel of the Regiment: Lieutenant General PP Singh

Insignia
- Abbreviation: 48 Armd Regt

48 Armoured Regiment is an armoured regiment of the Indian Army.

== History ==
The regiment was raised on 1 December 1982 under the command of Lieutenant Colonel DS Dhadwal at Meerut. It has an all-India, all-class composition, drawing troops from various castes and religions. Major General PS Dahiya is the current Colonel of the Regiment. Men from the regiment have participated in counter insurgency operations through tenures in the Rashtriya Rifles.

== Gallantry awards ==
The regiment has won the following gallantry awards -

- Shaurya Chakra – 1 (Sowar Varinder Kumar Sharma was awarded the Shaurya Chakra posthumously on the eve of Independence Day, 2008. On 25 Sep 2007, Sowar Sharma, while posted in the 60th battalion of Rashtriya Rifles eliminated two hard-core terrorists during a gunfight, before succumbing to his injuries.
- COAS Commendation Cards – 3

== Equipment ==
The Regiment is presently equipped with the T-90 tanks.

== Regimental insignia ==
The Regimental insignia consists of crossed lances with pennons of the regimental colours, mounted with the trident, with the numeral "48" inscribed on the crossing of the lances and a scroll at the base with the Regimental Motto in Devanagari script. The Regimental motto is सम्मान या बलिदान (Samman Ya Balidan), which translates to "Honour or Sacrifice". The shoulder title consists of the numeral "48" in brass.
