= 52nd Armoured Regiment (India) =

Indian Army regiment

52 Armoured Regiment
- Active: 1994 – present
- Country: India
- Allegiance: India
- Branch: Indian Army
- Type: Armoured Corps
- Size: Regiment
- Motto: We lead through danger
- Colors: French Grey, Buff, Red and Green
- Equipment: T-72

Commanders
- Colonel of the Regiment: Lieutenant General PP Singh

Insignia
- Abbreviation: 52 Armd Regt

52nd Armoured Regiment is an armoured regiment of the Indian Army Armoured Corps.

== Formation ==
The regiment was raised on 1 February 1994 at Roorkee with T-72 tanks. The first commandant was Col Jugvir Singh. The first Colonel of the regiment was Brigadier A.S. Sinha. The regiment has an all India, all class composition.

== History ==
Capt Upmanyu Singh of the regiment was posthumously awarded the Sena Medal in 2011 for gallantry during counter insurgency operations at Sopore in north Kashmir's Baramulla district.

The present Colonel of the regiment is Brig Samarth Nagar.

== Regimental Insignia ==
The cap badge of the regiment is unique in the Indian Army, as it consists of a Welsh dragon motif against a background of two vertically parallel lances with a scroll below bearing the words "52 Armoured Regiment".

The motto of the regiment is "We lead through danger".

The unit flag contains four colours - French Grey, Buff, Red and Green which signify the phrase "In misty dawn, through sand and blood to green fields beyond."
