= 60th Armoured Regiment (India) =

Indian Army regiment

60 Armoured Regiment
- Active: 2019 – present
- Country: India
- Allegiance: India
- Branch: Indian Army
- Type: Armoured Corps
- Size: Regiment
- Nickname: Panthers
- Colors: Blue, yellow and green
- Equipment: T-90 tanks

Commanders
- Colonel of the Regiment: Lieutenant General Vipul Singhal

Insignia
- Abbreviation: 60 Armd Regt

60 Armoured Regiment is an armoured regiment of the Indian Army.

== History ==
The regiment was raised in 2019 at Ahmednagar. It is equipped with the T-90 tanks and is currently part of the Jhansi based 31 Armoured Division (White Tiger Division).

== Gallantry awards ==
- COAS Commendation Cards - ALD Bammidi Vinod Kumar
