= 56th Armoured Regiment (India) =

Indian Army regiment

56 Armoured Regiment
- Active: 2011 – present
- Country: India
- Allegiance: India
- Branch: Indian Army
- Type: Armoured Corps
- Size: Regiment
- Nickname: Lionhearts

Commanders
- Colonel of the Regiment: Lieutenant General PP Singh

Insignia
- Abbreviation: 56 Armd Regt

56 Armoured Regiment is an armoured regiment of the Indian Army Armoured Corps.

== Formation ==
The regiment, nicknamed the 'Lionhearts', is one of the youngest armoured regiments and was raised on 1 October 2011. Lieutenant General Ajai Singh is the current Colonel of the Regiment.

== Gallantry awards ==
The regiment has won the following gallantry awards:

- COAS Commendation Cards – 1
