= 55th Armoured Regiment (India) =

Armored regiment of Indian military

- Country: India
- Allegiance: India
- Branch: Indian Army
- Type: Armour
- Size: Regiment
- Mottos: युद्धाय कृत निश्चयः Yudhyay Krit Nishchayah (Into Battle with Resolve)
- Anniversaries: 21 Dec 2011
- Equipment: T90 tanks

Commanders
- Colonel of the Regiment: Lieutenant General Vipul Singhal

Insignia
- Abbreviation: 55 Armd Regt

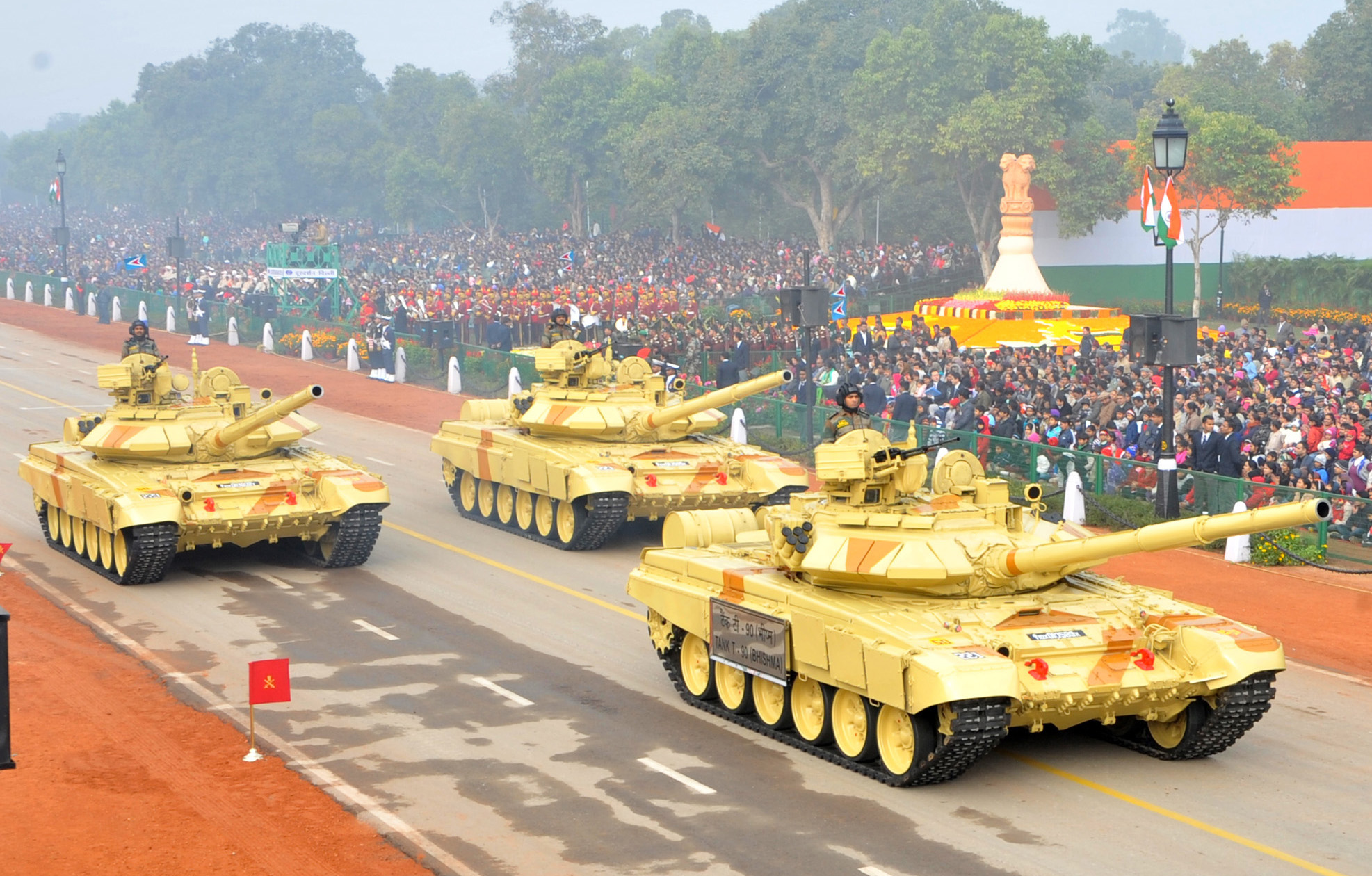
T-90 Bhishma of 55 Armoured Regiment passes through the Rajpath during the 65th Republic Day Parade in New Delhi on January 26, 2014

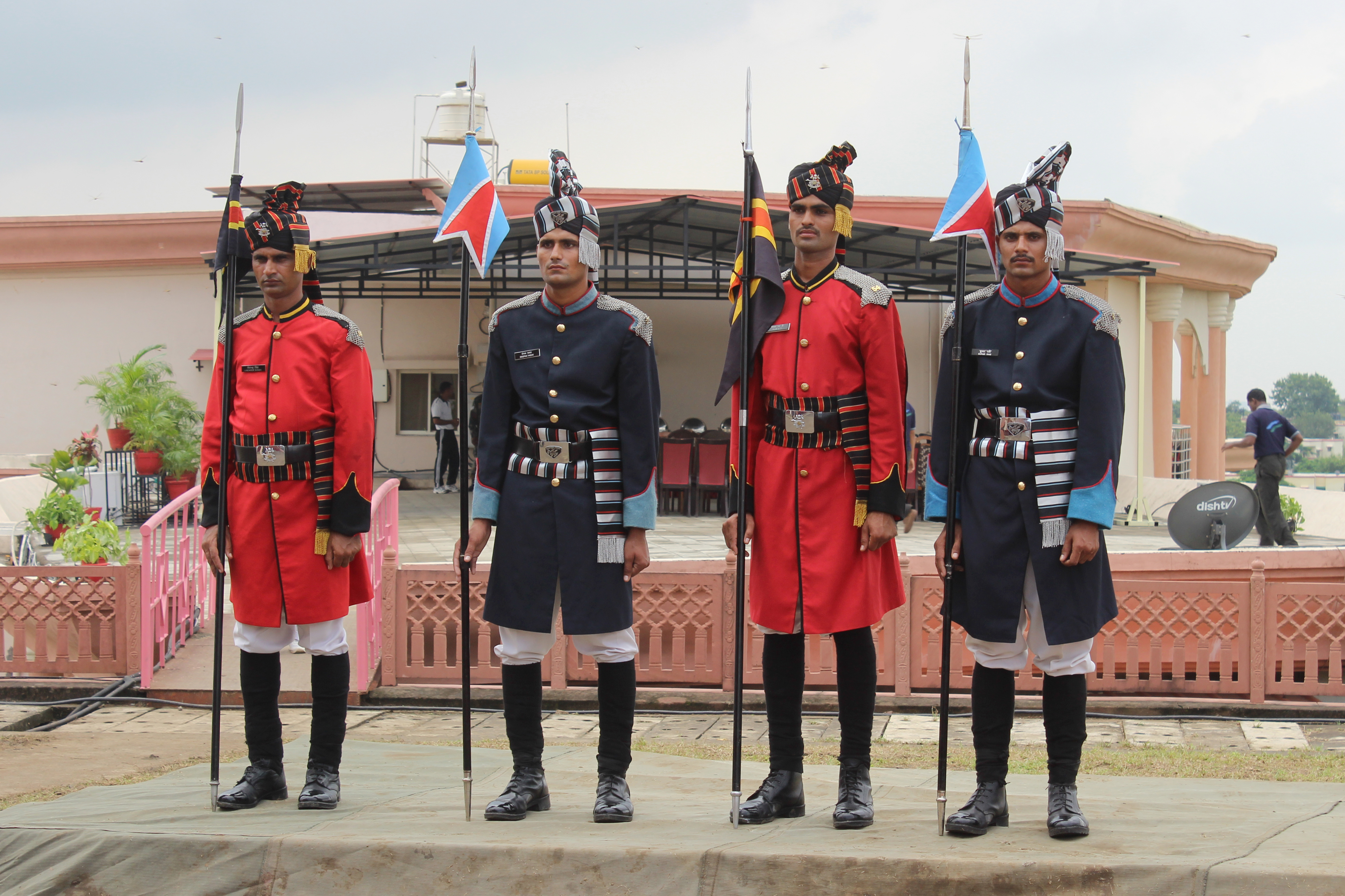
Regimental soldiers in ceremonial dress (in dark blue)

55th Armoured Regiment is part of the Armoured Corps of the Indian Army.

The Regiment had the honour of participating in the Republic Day parade in 2014 with their T-90 tanks.

The motto of the regiment is युद्धाय दृढ़ निश्चय (Yudhyay Dridh Nishchay), which translates to ‘Into Battle with Resolve’.

== Gallantry Awards ==
The regiment has won the following gallantry awards–

- COAS Commendation Card -
  - Naib Risaldar Mahale Yogesh Bhaidas (Operation Sindoor)
