= 87th Armoured Regiment (India) =

Indian Army regiment

87 Armoured Regiment
- Active: 1979 – present
- Country: India
- Allegiance: India
- Branch: Indian Army
- Type: Armoured Corps
- Size: Regiment
- Nickname: Lightning Streaks Regiment
- Mottos: निश्चय कर अपनी जीत करौं "Nischay Kar Apni Jeet Karon" (With determination, I will be triumphant)
- Equipment: T-72

Commanders
- Colonel of the Regiment: Lieutenant General Rajesh Pushkar

Insignia
- Abbreviation: 87 Armd Regt

87 Armoured Regiment is an armoured regiment of the Indian Army.

== Formation ==
The regiment was raised on 1 July 1979 at Ahmednagar under Lieutenant Colonel DD Singh. It has an all-India all-class composition, drawing troops from various castes and religions.

== Equipment ==
The regiment was initially equipped with Vijayanta tanks, which was changed in 1995 to the T-72 main battle tank.

== Operations ==
87 Armoured Regiment has taken part in Operation Trident, Operation Rakshak, Operation Vijay, Operation Parakram and Operation Falcon.

== Awards and honours ==
Two PVSM, one Kirti Chakra, two AVSM, one Shaurya Chakra, three Sena Medals, two VSM and several commendations have been conferred on the regiment. The recipients include-

- Kirti Chakra : Sowar Vijay Kumar, while serving in 22 Rashtriya Rifles (Punjab) was conferred the award posthumously. He was awarded for his gallant action against terrorists on 02 August 2018 in Baramulla district of Jammu and Kashmir.
- Mentioned in dispatches : Naib Risaldar Agya Ram, Lance Daffadar Sanjeev Kumar, Sowar A.S. Rao.
- COAS Commendation Card - Daffadar Karan Singh (Operation Sindoor)
- President's Standard : The Regiment was presented the ‘President’s Standards’ at Suratgarh on 5 December 2017 by General Bipin Rawat, Chief of the Army Staff, on behalf of the President of India, Mr Ram Nath Kovind.
- The Regiment had the honour of participating in the Republic Day parade in 1989 with its Vijayanta tanks.

== Regimental Insignia ==
The Regimental insignia consists of a circle with three lightning streaks in front of crossed lances with pennons in red and black. The numeral "87" is inscribed between the crossing of the lances and a scroll added at the base with the words ‘Kavachit Regiment’ (Armoured Regiment) inscribed in Devanagari script on it.

The motto of the Regiment is निश्चय कर अपनी जीत करौं (Nischay Kar Apni Jeet Karon), which translates to ‘With determination, I will be triumphant’.
