= 13th Armoured Regiment (India) =

Indian Army regiment

- Active: 1984 – present
- Country: India
- Allegiance: India
- Branch: Indian Army Armoured Corps
- Type: Armoured
- Role: Armoured Combat
- Size: Regiment
- Nickname: Triskaideca
- Motto: वीर भोग्या वसुंधरा Veer Bhogya Vasundhara (The Brave shall inherit the Earth)
- Colors: Scarlet and French Grey
- Anniversaries: Raising Day - 21 December
- Equipment: T-90

Commanders
- Colonel of the Regiment: Lieutenant General PP Singh

Insignia
- Abbreviation: 13 Armd Regt

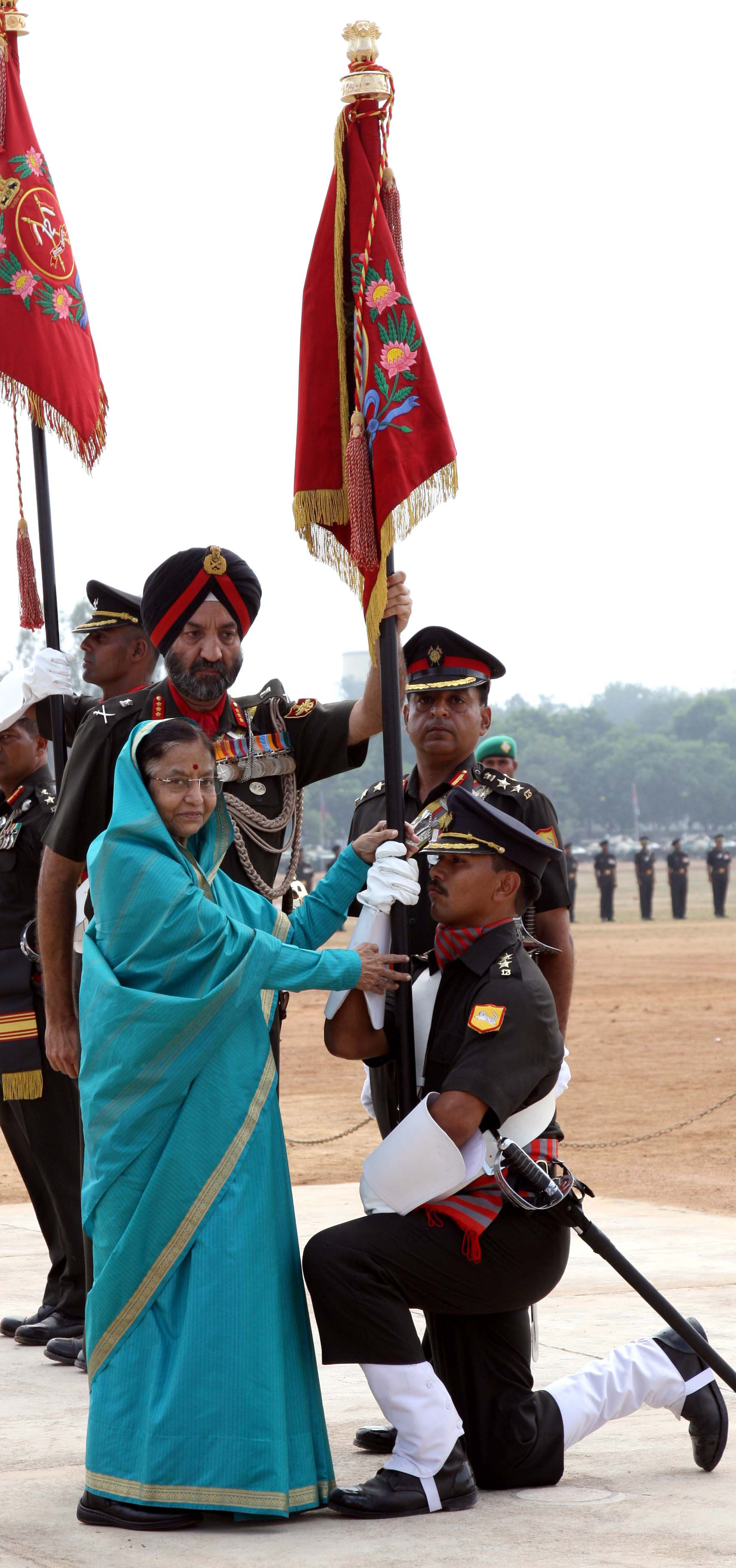
The President Mrs Pratibha Patil presenting the colours at Babina, Uttar Pradesh on October 19, 2010

13th Armoured Regiment is an armoured regiment of the Indian Army.

== Raising ==
The regiment was raised on 21 December 1984 at Ahmednagar under the command of Lt Col Balram Singh Mehta, a war hero of Battle of Garibpur in 1971.The regiment was initially raised with Sikh, Rajput and South Indian squadrons, but was later converted to "All India- All Class" composition.

== History ==
First equipped with Vijayanta tanks, the regiment converted to T-90 tank profile in 2004. Its first operational assignment, however, was in counter-insurgency duties in Jammu and Kashmir.

The regiment had the honour of participating in Republic Day Parades in 1987 and 2009 with Vijayanta and T-90 tanks respectively.

The regiment was presented the ‘President's Standards’ at Babina on 19 October 2010 by the President of India, Ms Pratibha Patil.

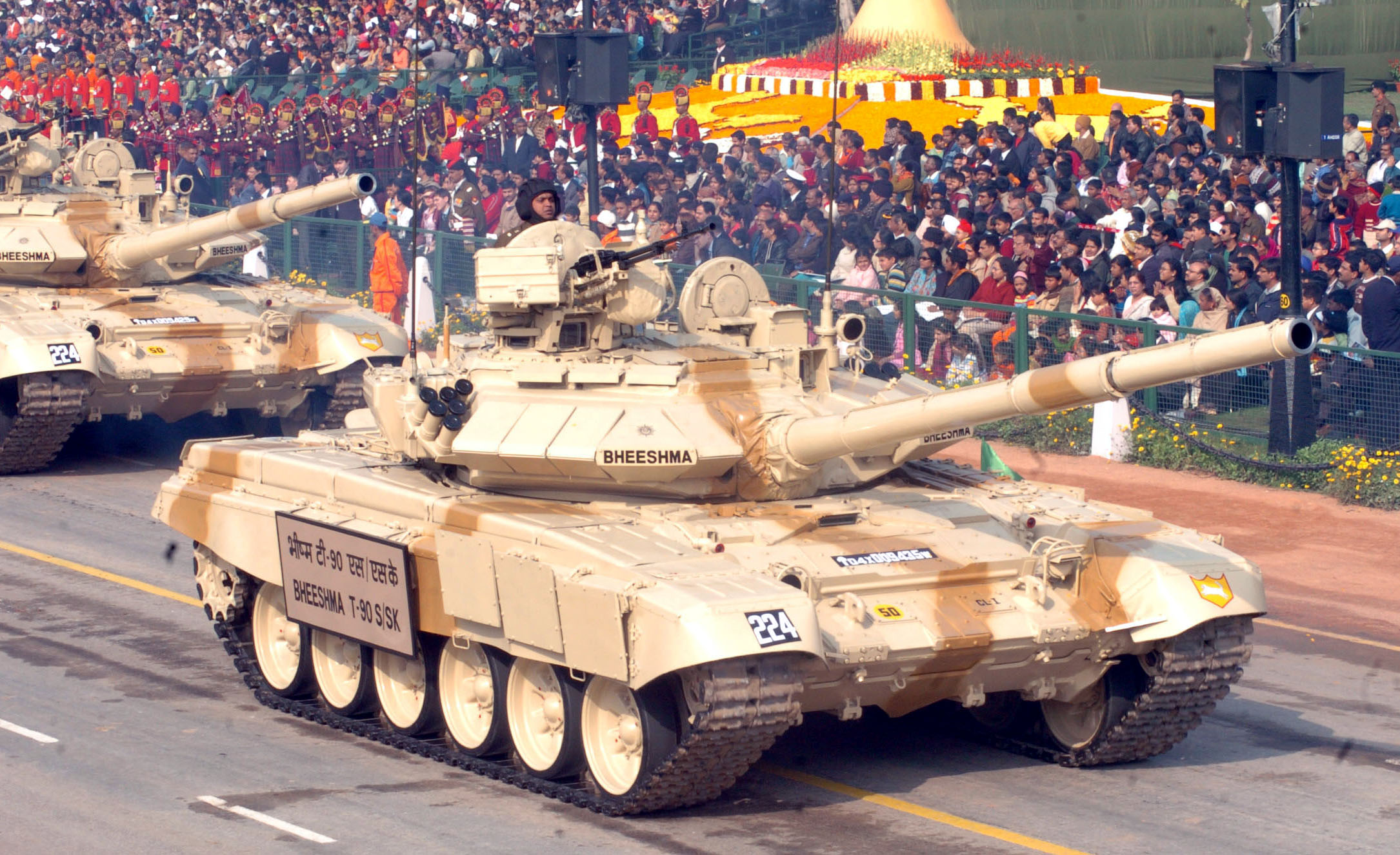
T-90 Tanks of 13 Armoured Regiment pass through the Rajpath during 60th Republic Day Parade, 2009

== Regimental Insignia ==
The regimental crest is a brass sunburst with white metal crossed lances and pennons. Number 13 is inscribed as the core of the sun and the regimental motto is inscribed in a circle around the core. Number 13 in brass is worn as shoulder titles by all personnel of the regiment.
