= 19th Armoured Regiment (India) =

Indian army regiment

19 Armoured Regiment
- Active: 1985 – present
- Country: India
- Allegiance: India
- Branch: Indian Army
- Type: Armoured Corps
- Size: Regiment
- Nickname: Invincibles
- Mottos: विद्या विनय वीरता Vidya, Vinay, Veerta (Knowledge, Humility and Bravery)
- Equipment: T-90 tanks

Commanders
- Colonel of the Regiment: Lieutenant General Rajesh Pushkar

Insignia
- Abbreviation: 19 Armd Regt

19 Armoured Regiment is an armoured regiment of the Indian Army.

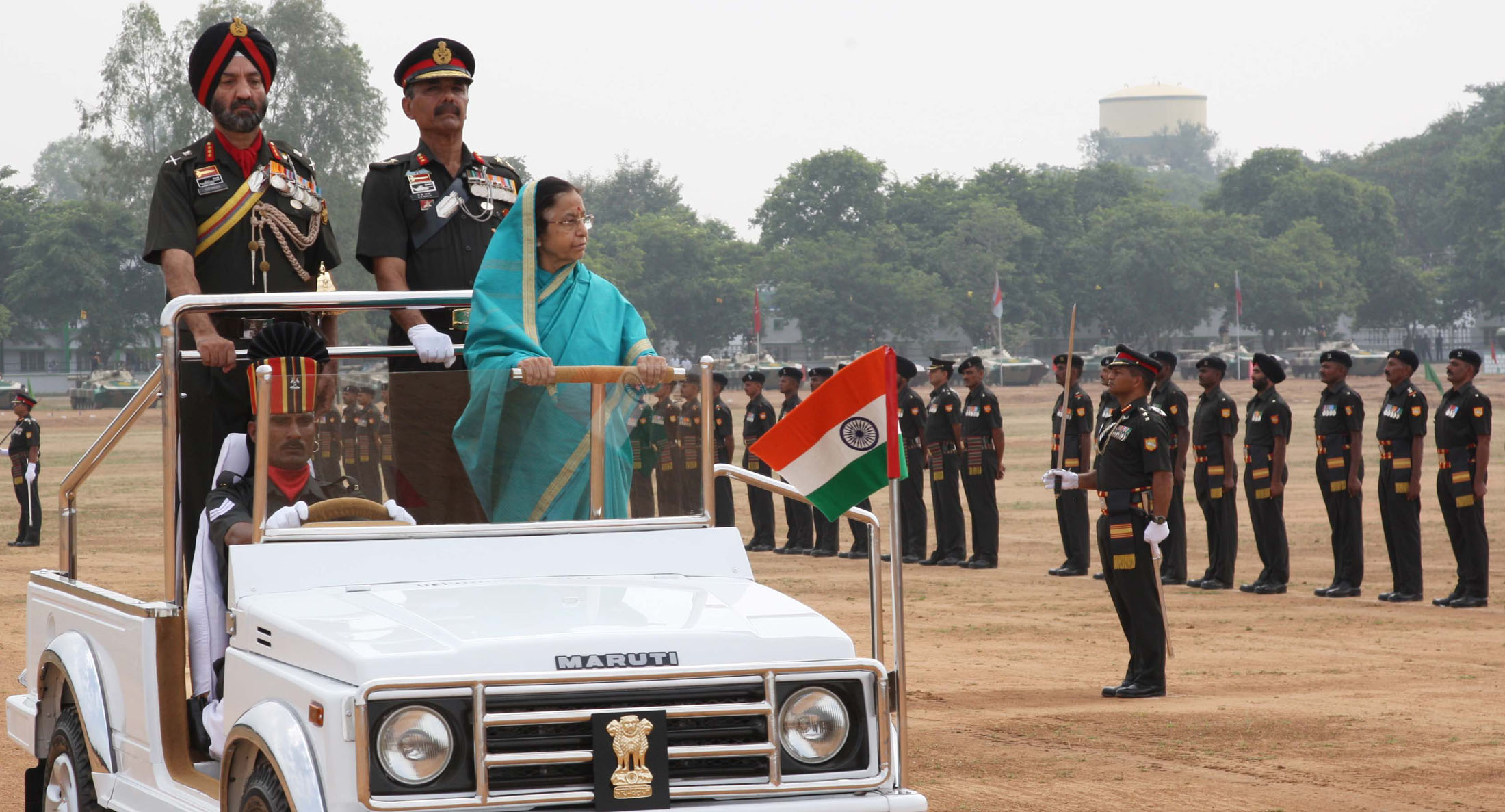
The President and Supreme Commander of the Armed Forces, Mrs. Pratibha Patil inspecting the Guard of Honour, at Babina, Uttar Pradesh on October 19, 2010 during the presentation of the colours.

== Formation ==
19 Armoured Regiment was raised on 25 March 1985 at Ahmednagar. It has an all-India all-class composition, drawing troops from various castes and religions.

== History ==
The Regiment was presented the ‘President’s Standards’ at Babina, Uttar Pradesh on 19 October 2010 by the then President of India, Mrs. Prathiba Patil. Five armoured regiments of the 31 Armoured Division (19, 12, 13, 83 and 15 Armoured Regiments) were awarded the colours.

The Regiment had the honour of participating in the Republic Day parade in 2018.

== Equipment ==
The Regiment was equipped with Vijayanta tanks at its raising. It is presently equipped with the T-90 tanks.

== Regimental Insignia ==
The Regimental insignia consists of crossed lances with pennons, overlaid with the numeral "19" inscribed on the crossing of the lances, mounted by an armoured fist and a scroll at the base with the words " कवचित रेजिमेंट" (Kavachit Regiment, meaning Armoured Regiment) in Devanagari script.

The motto of the regiment is ‘विद्या विनय वीरता’ (Vidya, Vinay, Veerta), which translates to ‘Knowledge, Humility and Bravery’.
