= 54th Armoured Regiment (India) =

Armoured regiment of the Indian Army

54 Armoured Regiment
- Active: 2010 – present
- Country: India
- Allegiance: India
- Branch: Indian Army
- Type: Armoured Corps
- Size: Regiment
- Mottos: सर्वत्र यशोविजय; Sarvatra Yashovijay (Success and victory everywhere)
- Equipment: T-90 tanks

Commanders
- Colonel of the Regiment: Lieutenant General Devendra Sharma

Insignia
- Abbreviation: 54 Armd Regt

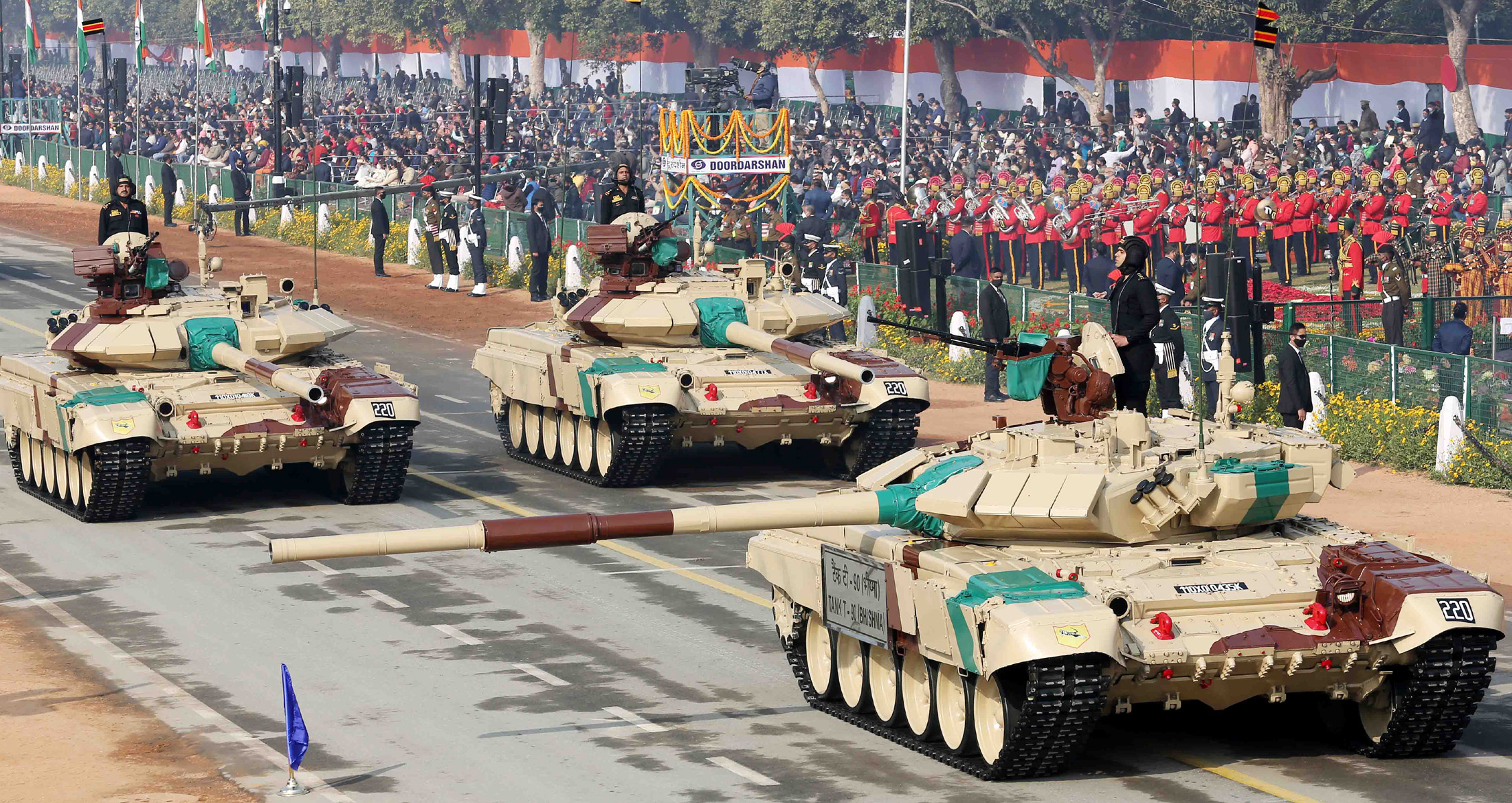
T- 90 Bhishma of 54 Armoured Regiment passes through the Rajpath, at the 72nd Republic Day Parade 2021

54 Armoured Regiment is an armoured regiment of the Indian Army.

== Formation ==
54 Armoured Regiment was raised on 1 July 2010. It was the first regiment to be equipped with the T-90 tanks at raising.

== History ==
It is the youngest armoured regiment to have been conferred with a ‘Unit Citation’ within eight years of its raising. The regiment has seen deployment in South Kashmir during abrogation of Article 370 and Section 35A.

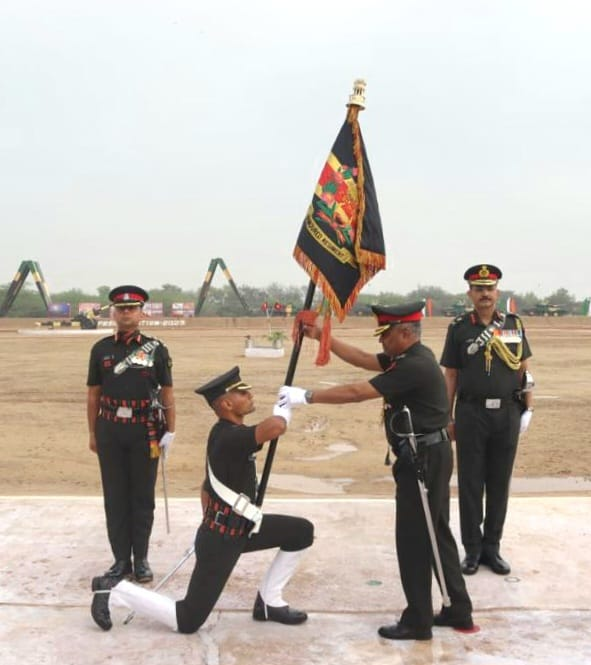
General Manoj Pande, COAS, presented the prestigious ‘President’s Standards’ to 54 Armoured Regiment, 2023

The Regiment had the honour of participating in the Republic Day parade and the Army Day parade in 2021.

The Chief of Army Staff, General Manoj Pande presented the President's Standards to the regiment at Suratgarh military station on 25 March 2023.

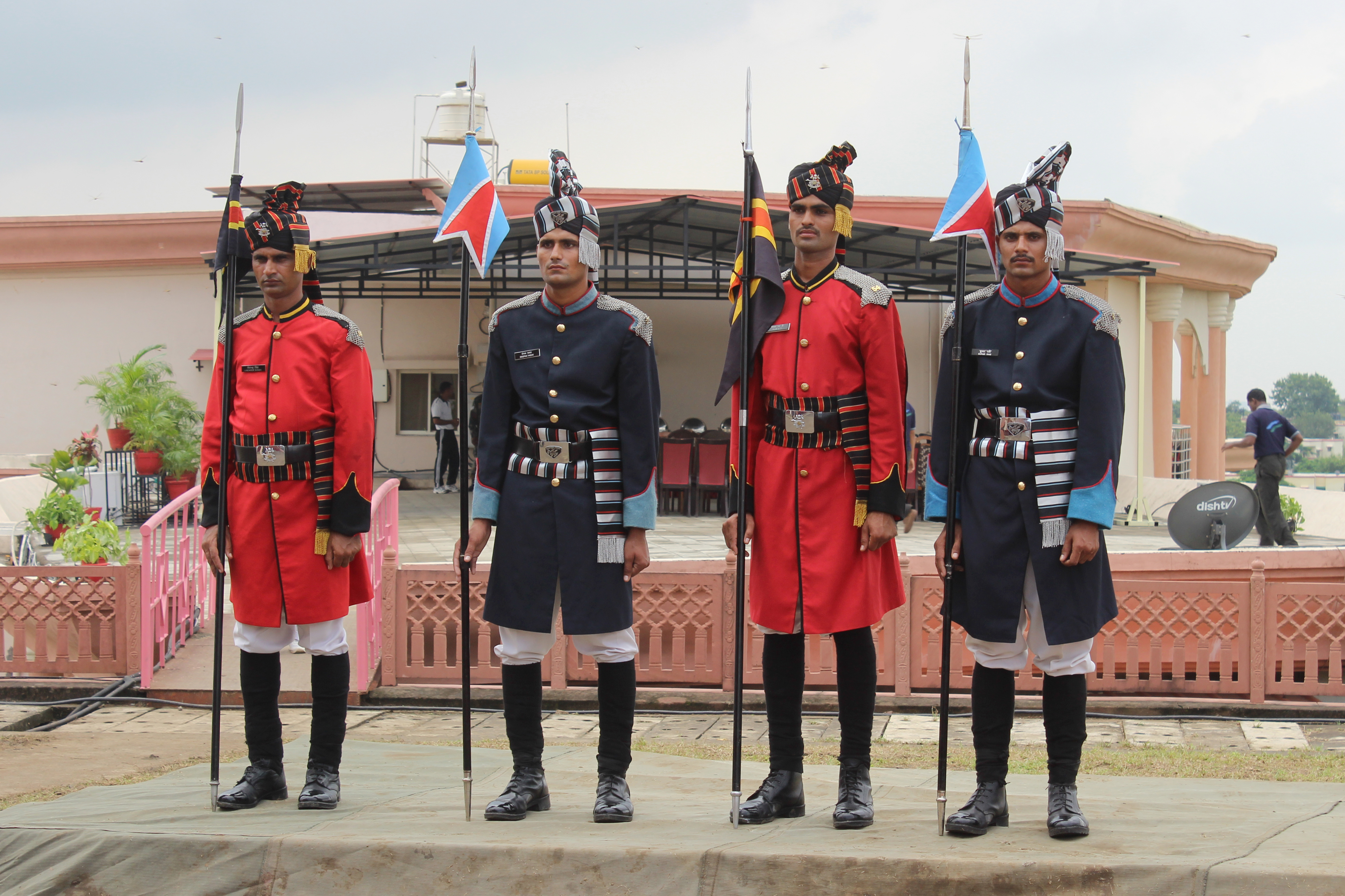
Regimental soldiers in ceremonial dress (in red)
