= 58th Armoured Regiment (India) =

Indian armored regiment

58 Armoured Regiment
- Active: 1 October 2014 – present
- Country: India
- Allegiance: India
- Branch: Indian Army
- Type: Armour
- Size: Regiment
- Nicknames: Awwal Atthawan, the Patiala Risala
- Mottos: सर्वश्रेष्ठ; Sarvaśrēṣṭha (ISO) transl. "The best of all"
- Colors: Orange, white and black
- Anniversaries: Raising Day: 1 October
- Equipment: T90 tanks

Commanders
- Colonel of the Regiment: General Dhiraj Seth

Insignia
- Abbreviation: 58 Armd Regt

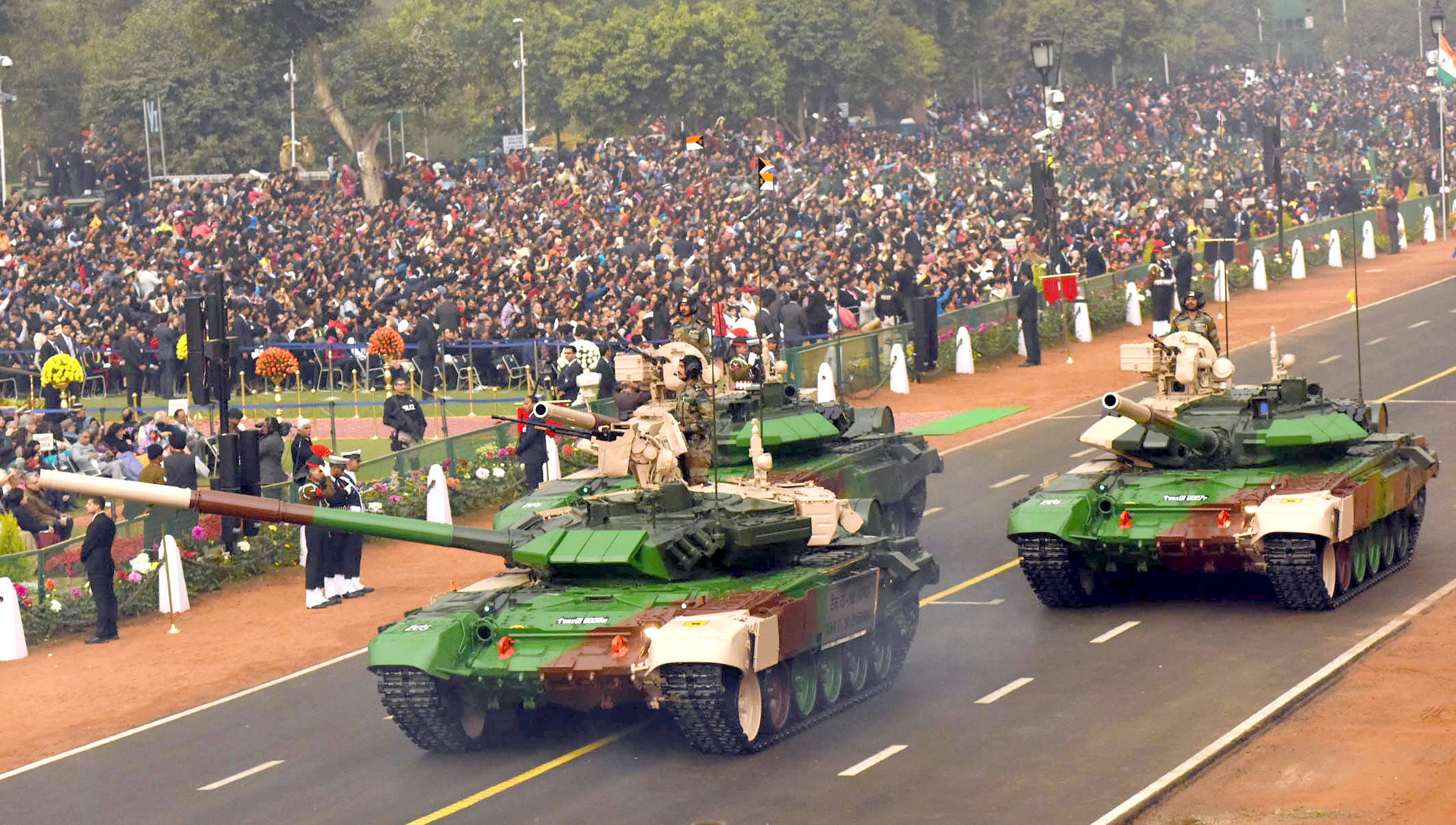
T-90 (Bhishma) tanks of 58 Armoured Regiment pass through Rajpath during the 68th Republic Day Parade in New Delhi on January 26, 2017

58 Armoured Regiment is a regiment in the Armoured Corps of the Indian Army. It was raised in Patiala on 1 October 2014 as an all-India all-caste regiment, i.e. its soldiers are recruited from all over India without any distinctions based on ethnicity, caste, region, etc.

Lieutenant General Kamal Jit Singh, PVSM, AVSM* was appointed as the first Colonel of the regiment on 20 January 2015.

The regiment participated in the Republic Day parade in 2017 with its T-90 tanks.

== Gallantry awards ==
- Major Arshdeep Singh Gill - Kirti Chakra, when attached to 1 Assam Rifles in 2025.
- Lance Dafadar Baldev Chand (posthumous) - Shaurya Chakra, when attached to 4 Rashtriya Rifles.
