= 12th Armoured Regiment (India) =

Indian Army regiment

12th Armoured Regiment IAAC
- Active: 1984 – present
- Country: India
- Allegiance: India
- Branch: Indian Army
- Type: Armour
- Size: Regiment
- Nickname: Barasinghas
- Motto: Sahauryamev Jeevanam (Life with Valour)
- Equipment: T-90

Commanders
- Colonel of the Regiment: Lieutenant General Mohit Malhotra

Insignia
- Abbreviation: 12 Armd Regt

The 12th Armoured Regiment is an armoured regiment which is part of the Armoured Corps of the Indian Army. The regiment was raised as an all-class regiment on 1 October 1984 by Lieutenant Colonel L.R. Vaid at Kapurthala with Vijayanta tanks.

== History ==
The regiment was subsequently converted to T-90 tanks. The regiment has served in Operation Trident, Operation Rakshak I and Operation Rakshak II.

The regiment has adopted the nickname Barasinghas (meaning 12-point stag), and representing the Barasingha, or swamp deer (Rucervus duvaucelii), a deer species endemic to India. This was inspired by the statue of a barasingha stag in full cry in the palace of the Maharaja of Kapurthala. Each of the tines of the antlers is said to symbolise one of the 12 tank troops of the regiment.

The Regiment had the honour of participating in the annual Republic Day parade in 2004 and 2005.

The Regiment was presented the ‘President's Standards’ at Babina on 19 October 2010 by the then President of India, Mrs Prathiba Patil.

The regiment was awarded GOC-in-C, South Western Command Unit Citation in 2018.

== Regimental Insignia ==
The cap badge of the unit has crossed lances and pennons, with the numeral 12 at the crossing, with the regimental motto inscribed on a scroll below in Devanagari script. The cap badge is in silver plate for officers and nickel plate for other ranks. The motto of the regiment is "Shauryamev Jeevnam" which means 'life with valour'.
