= 73rd Armoured Regiment (India) =

Indian Army regiment

73 Armoured Regiment
- Active: 1971 – present
- Country: India
- Allegiance: India
- Branch: Indian Army
- Type: Armoured Corps
- Size: Regiment
- Nickname: The Desert Rats
- Mottos: 'पवित्रता, दृढ़ता और वीरता'; Pavitrata, Dridhta, Veerta
- Colors: Purple and Black
- Equipment: T-90

Commanders
- Colonel of the Regiment: Lieutenant General PP Singh

Insignia
- Abbreviation: 73 Armd Regt

73 Armoured Regiment is an armoured regiment of the Indian Army.

== Formation ==
The 73 Armoured Regiment has the unique distinction of being raised during wartime, being formed on 3 December 1971, the day the Indo-Pak war broke out. It was raised at Vijay Lines, Ahmednagar, with a unique class composition of three martial communities - Sikhs, Rajputs and Qaimkhani Muslims. The first commanding officer was Lieutenant Colonel (later Major General) KM Dhody.

== History ==
The Regiment with its T-55 tanks took part in the Republic Day parade in 1992.

The Regiment was presented the President's Standard on 27 November 2011 by the then President of India Mrs Prathiba Patil. 73 Armoured Regiment along with four other Armoured Regiments of the 1 Armoured Division were presented with the colours in Patiala.

== Equipment ==
The Regiment was equipped with the T-55 tanks at raising. It is now equipped with the T-90 tanks.

== Operations ==
It has participated in Operation Trident, Operation Vijay, Operation Rakshak and Operation Parakram. It has also performed exceedingly well in deserts, thereby earning the sobriquet 'The Desert Rats'. The regiment has won two Vir Chakras.

== Regimental Insignia ==
The Regiment’s crest comprises crossed lances with the Sheesh Kavach of the legendary Prithviraj Chauhan and a scroll at the base. The Sheesh displays his temporal powers while the Kavach exhibits his skill at using arms. The motto of the Regiment is 'पवित्रता, दृढ़ता और वीरता' ('Pavitrata, Dridhta, Veerta'). The Regimental colours are Purple and Black.
