= 83rd Armoured Regiment (India) =

Indian Army regiment

83 Armoured Regiment
- Active: 1976 – present
- Country: India
- Allegiance: India
- Branch: Indian Army
- Type: Armoured Corps
- Size: Regiment
- Mottos: One for all, all for one
- Equipment: T-90

Commanders
- Colonel of the Regiment: Lieutenant General PP Singh

Insignia
- Abbreviation: 83 Armd Regt

83 Armoured Regiment is an armoured regiment of the Indian Army.

== Formation ==
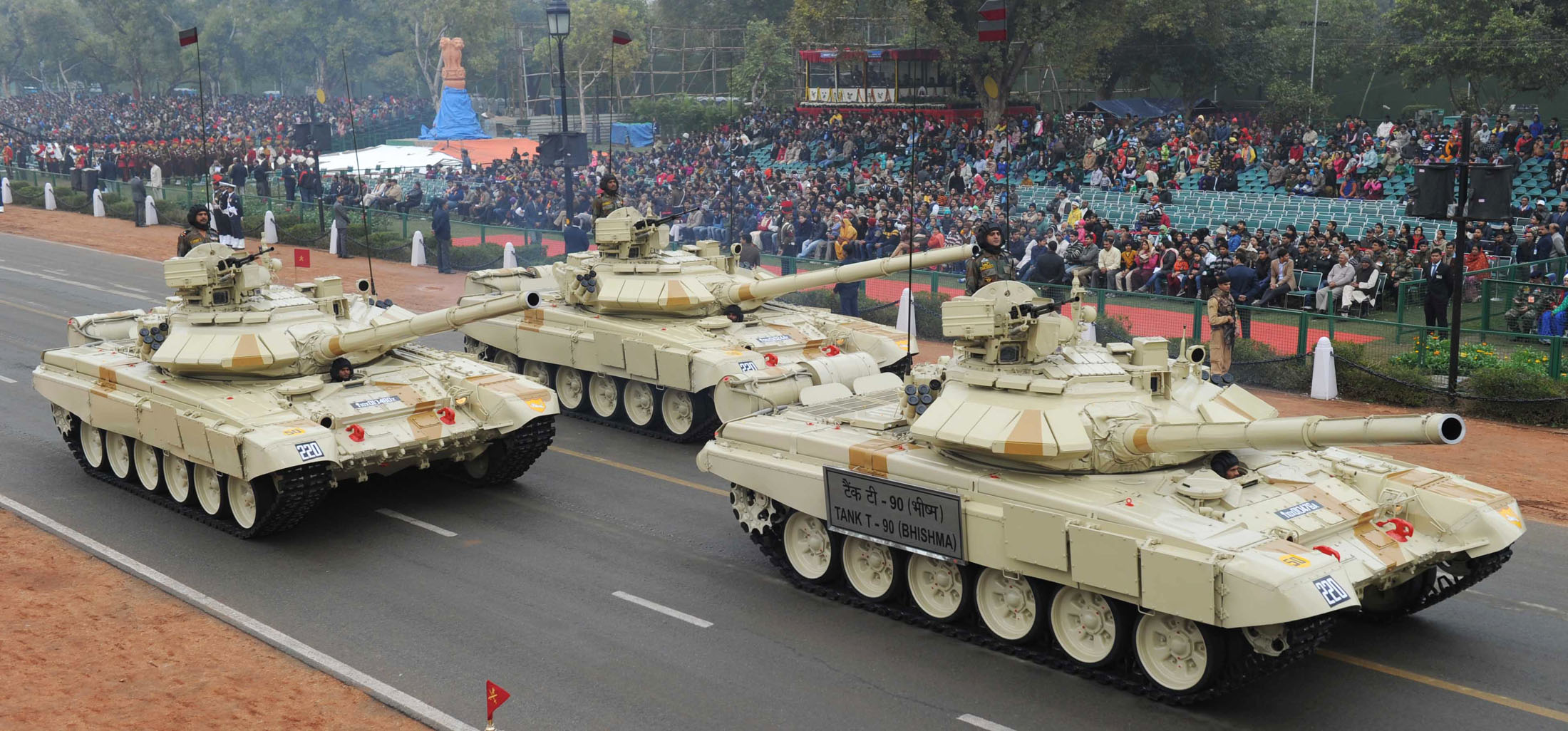
T-90 Tanks of the 83 Armoured Regiment pass through the Rajpath during the rehearsal of the Republic Day Parade in 2015

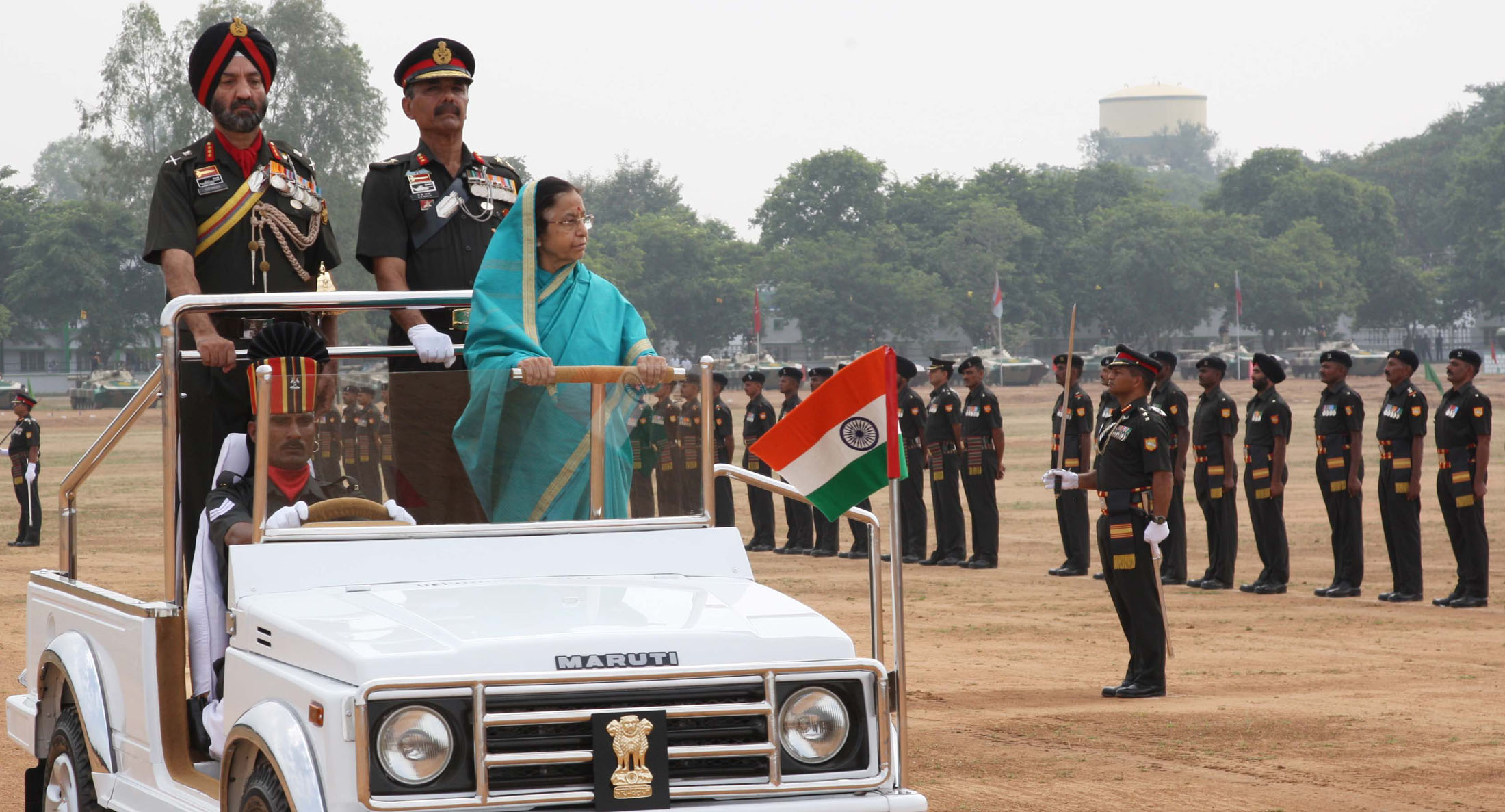
The President and Supreme Commander of the Armed Forces, Mrs. Pratibha Patil inspecting the Guard of Honour, at Babina, Uttar Pradesh on October 19, 2010 during the presentation of the colours

83 Armoured Regiment was raised on 1 January 1976 in Ahmednagar.

== History ==
The regiment was raised on 01 Jan 76 under the command of then Lt Col (Later Brig) Ashok Johar. The "Flag hoisting" ceremony was held on 28 February 1976 on adoption of the regiment colours. The regiment colours are "French Grey" on top, which signifies 'Determination and Endurance' and "Maroon" at bottom signifying 'Might and Strength.'

The Regiment was equipped with T-55 tanks with which it served till conversion to the T-90 tanks in June 2010.

The Regiment was presented the ‘President's Standards’ at Babina, Uttar Pradesh on 19 October 2010 by the then President of India, Mrs. Prathiba Patil. Five armoured regiments of the 31 Armoured Division (83, 12, 13, 15 and 19 Armoured Regiments) were awarded the colours.

The Regiment had the honour of participating in the annual Republic Day parade in 1980 and 2015.

== Equipment ==
The Regiment is presently equipped with the T-90 tank.

== Regimental Insignia ==
The Regimental insignia consists of crossed lances with pennons of the regimental colours with numeral "83" inscribed on the crossing of the lances, mounted by an 'armoured fist' and a scroll with the words 'Armoured Regiment' at the base. The shoulder title consists of the numeral "83" in brass.

== Regimental Motto ==
The Regimental motto is "One for all - all for one" . This signifies loyalty and support between all ranks of the regiment both in peace and war and utmost loyalty to regimental colours at all times.

== Major Operations ==
The regiment has participated in three major operations :

1. Operation Trident : In January 1986, the regiment under the command of Colonel HS Dhillon got deployed in the western sector.
2. Operation Vijay : The Regiment was deployed in January 1999 under the command of Colonel BS Sidhu.
3. Operation Parakram : Under the command of Colonel (later Major General) Bishamber Dayal, the regiment was mobilized at a very short notice in December 2001.
