= 89th Armoured Regiment (India) =

Indian Army regiment

89 Armoured Regiment
- Active: 1980–present
- Country: India
- Allegiance: India
- Branch: Indian Army
- Type: Armoured Corps
- Size: Regiment
- Nickname: Bragenar
- Mottos: “Veerta Ya Veergati” वीरता या वीरगति
- Colors: Red, Black and Gold
- Equipment: T-72 tanks

Commanders
- Colonel of the Regiment: Lieutenant General Mohit Malhotra
- Notable commanders: Lt Gen Anil Chait, PVSM, AVSM, VSM; Lt Gen Anil Bhalla PVSM, AVSM, VSM

Insignia
- Abbreviation: 89 Armd Regt

89 Armoured Regiment is an armoured regiment of the Indian Army.

== Formation ==
89 Armoured Regiment was raised on 1 February 1980 at Ahmednagar under the command of Lt Col KL Bakshi based on a ‘mixed class composition’ with manpower drawn from existing Armoured Regiments. It was equipped with Vijayanta tanks.

== History ==
After its formation, the Regiment was moved under the Headquarters of the 39 Infantry Division at Yol. In January 1987, the Regiment was deployed to participate in Operation Trident, followed by a counter-insurgency tenure as part of Operation Rakshak I. In 1992, the Regiment joined the 16 Infantry Division based in Sri Ganganagar. This was followed by a second counter-insurgency tenure as part of Operation Rakshak in 1996. The Regiment was mobilised again as part of Operation Parakram in 2001 under 14 Infantry Division. In 2005, the Regiment moved to join 3 Independent Armoured Brigade under IX Corps.

The Regiment was awarded the GOC-in-C (South Western Command) Unit Citation for its performance between 2008 and 2012, while serving in Ranchi as part of the 23 Infantry Division. The Regiment has also won 4 Sena Medals, 13 Chief of Army Staff Commendation Cards and 31 GOC-in-C Commendation Cards.

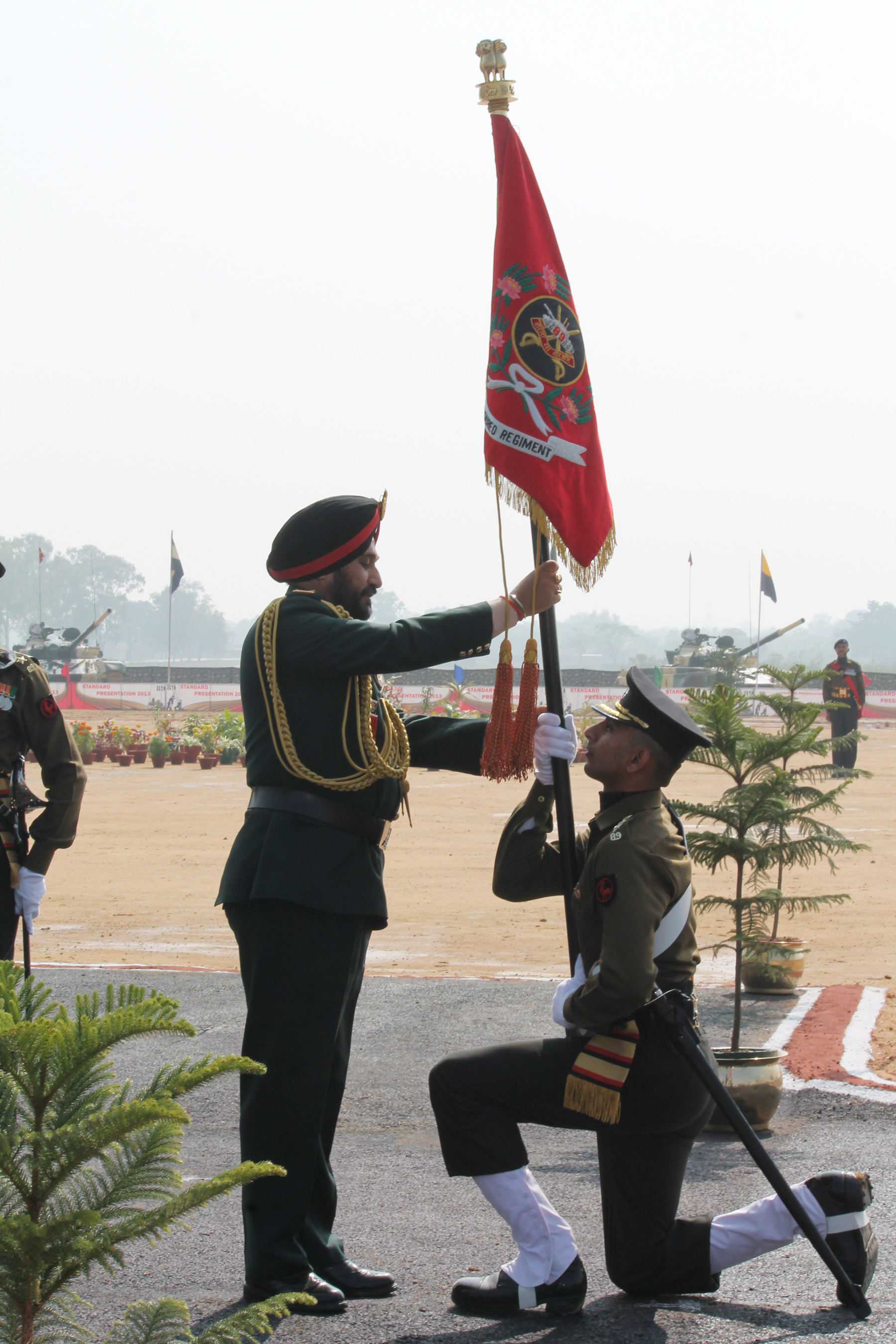
General Bikram Singh presenting ‘President's Standard’ to 89 Armoured Regiment in 2013

The Regiment was presented the ‘President's Standards’ at Namkum Military Station in 2013 by General Bikram Singh, Chief of the Army Staff, on behalf of the President of India, Mr Pranab Mukherjee.

== Equipment ==
The Vijayanta tanks were replaced by the T-72 tanks in 1997, which the Regiment continues to use.

== Regimental Insignia ==
The Regimental badge (since 1983) comprises two crossed swords overlaid by the Vijayanta tank and the numeral 89 with a scroll added at the base with the regimental motto (Veerta Ya Veergati) inscribed in Devanagari script on it. The shoulder title consists of the numeral "89" in brass.

The Regimental motto is “Veerta Ya Veergati” which means “Victory or Martyrdom”. The Colours of the Regiment are Red, Black and Gold.
