= 50th Armoured Regiment (India) =

Indian Army regiment

50 Armoured Regiment
- Active: 1987 – present
- Country: India
- Allegiance: India
- Branch: Indian Army
- Type: Armour
- Size: Regiment
- Nickname: Fear Naught
- Mottos: दिग्विजय; Digvijay “Victory in All Directions and Planes, in War and in Peace”.
- Colors: "Red & Green"
- Equipment: T-72 M1

Commanders
- Colonel of the Regiment: Lieutenant General Mohit Malhotra

Insignia
- Abbreviation: 50 Armd Regt

50 Armoured Regiment is an armoured regiment which is part of the Armoured Corps of the Indian Army.

== Formation ==
The regiment was raised on 7 September 1987 by Lt Col A.K. Bhatia at Ahmednagar with the designation of ad hoc Maintenance Group 'A' which was changed in 7 July 1989 to 50 Armoured Regiment The regiment was one of the few armoured regiments to be raised with T-72 tanks. The first Colonel of the Regiment was Lt Gen A.S. Sandhu.

== History ==
The Regiment has participated in internal security duties during Operation Rakshak. It has also taken part in Operation Vijay and Operation Parakram.

The Regiment with its T-72 tanks took part in the Republic Day parade and Army Day parade in 1996. The Regiment was presented the ‘President’s Standards’ at Mamun Military Station in Pathankot on 5 November 2014 by General Dalbir Singh, Chief of the Army Staff, on behalf of the President of India, Mr Pranab Mukherjee.

== Colors ==
The colours of the regiment are Red and Green. In the strict martial sense, these colours when seen in unison depict the traditional Verey Light success signal of “Red over Green” which signifies victory in battle. In a generic sense, Red is the traditional cavalry colour signifying supreme sacrifice while Green stands for the basic desire for peace, harmony, and well being of all ranks of the regiment. Seen together, the colours signify the regiment's preparedness for the supreme sacrifice when called upon to do so, from a basic stance of peace, harmony and well-being. These colours adorn the flag of the regiment.

== Cap badge ==
The regiment badge was designed by Lt Gen (Retd) (then Maj) AB Shivane, PVSM, AVSM, VSM, ADC. It symbolises an amalgamation of tradition and modernity. The cavalry heritage is represented by two pennants interposed at the centre with a horseshoe; and modernity is depicted by the hull of a T-72 M1 below the horseshoe. A scroll below this carries the word दिग्विजय (Digvijay), which means triumph in Devanagri script.

The shoulder title consists of the numeral "50" in brass.

== Colonels of the regiment ==
- Lt Gen AS Sandhu PVSM
- Brig AK Bhatia
- Maj Gen RS Mehta AVSM VSM
- Maj Gen JS Sidhu VSM
- Maj Gen Deepinder Singh SM VSM
- Lt Gen SH Kulkarni AVSM VSM**
- Lt Gen AB Shivane PVSM AVSM VSM ADC
- Maj Gen Sandeep Singh SM VSM
- Maj Gen Vikram Varma VSM** - Current Colonel of the Regiment

== Commandants ==
Maintenance Group "A"

- Lt Col (Later Brig) AK Bhatia

50 Armoured Regiment

- Col (Later Brig) AK Bhatia
- Col (Later Maj Gen) RS Mehta AVSM VSM
- Col (Later Maj Gen) JS Sidhu
- Col MS Hundal
- Col RC Rana
- Col (Later Lt Gen) AB Shivane PVSM AVSM VSM ADC
- Col (Later Maj Gen) Rajiv Edwards VSM**
- Col RS Bhatia
- Col Anil Bhatt
- Col Gaurav Bhatia
- Col Manvendra Singh
- Col Priyank Tripathi
- Col Jitendra Singh
- Col Rajat Sharma
- Col PJ Mane
- Col Ashish Swaroop SM
- Col Rajat Sangwan SM
- Col Ayan Sen - Current Commandant
