= 10th Armoured Regiment (India) =

Indian Army regiment

- Active: 1984 – present
- Country: India
- Allegiance: India
- Branch: Indian Army
- Type: Armour
- Size: Regiment
- Nickname: Force Ten
- Mottos: 'परम धर्म विजय'; Param Dharam Vijay (Victory is our main duty)
- Equipment: T-72

Commanders
- Colonel of the Regiment: Lieutenant General PP Singh

The 10th Armoured Regiment is an armoured regiment which is part of the Armoured Corps of the Indian Army.

== History ==
The regiment was raised on 16 April 1984 by Lt Col Kulwant Singh at Ahmednagar with Vijayanta tanks.

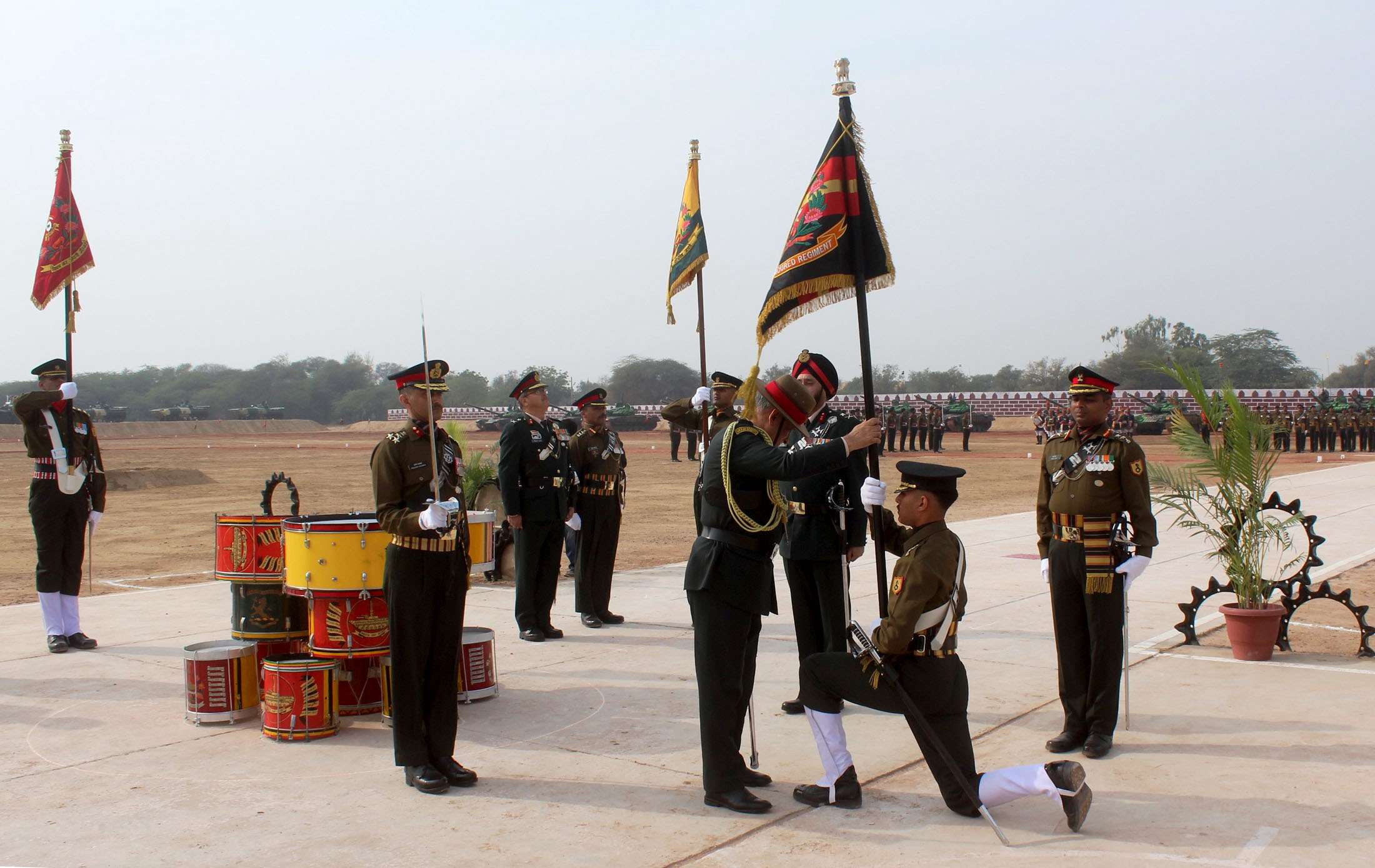
The Chief of Army Staff, General Bipin Rawat presenting the Standard Presentation to the 10, 41 and 87 Armoured Regiments at Suratgarh Military Station, Rajasthan on 5 December 2017. Lieutenant SS Slaria received the standard on behalf of the regiment.

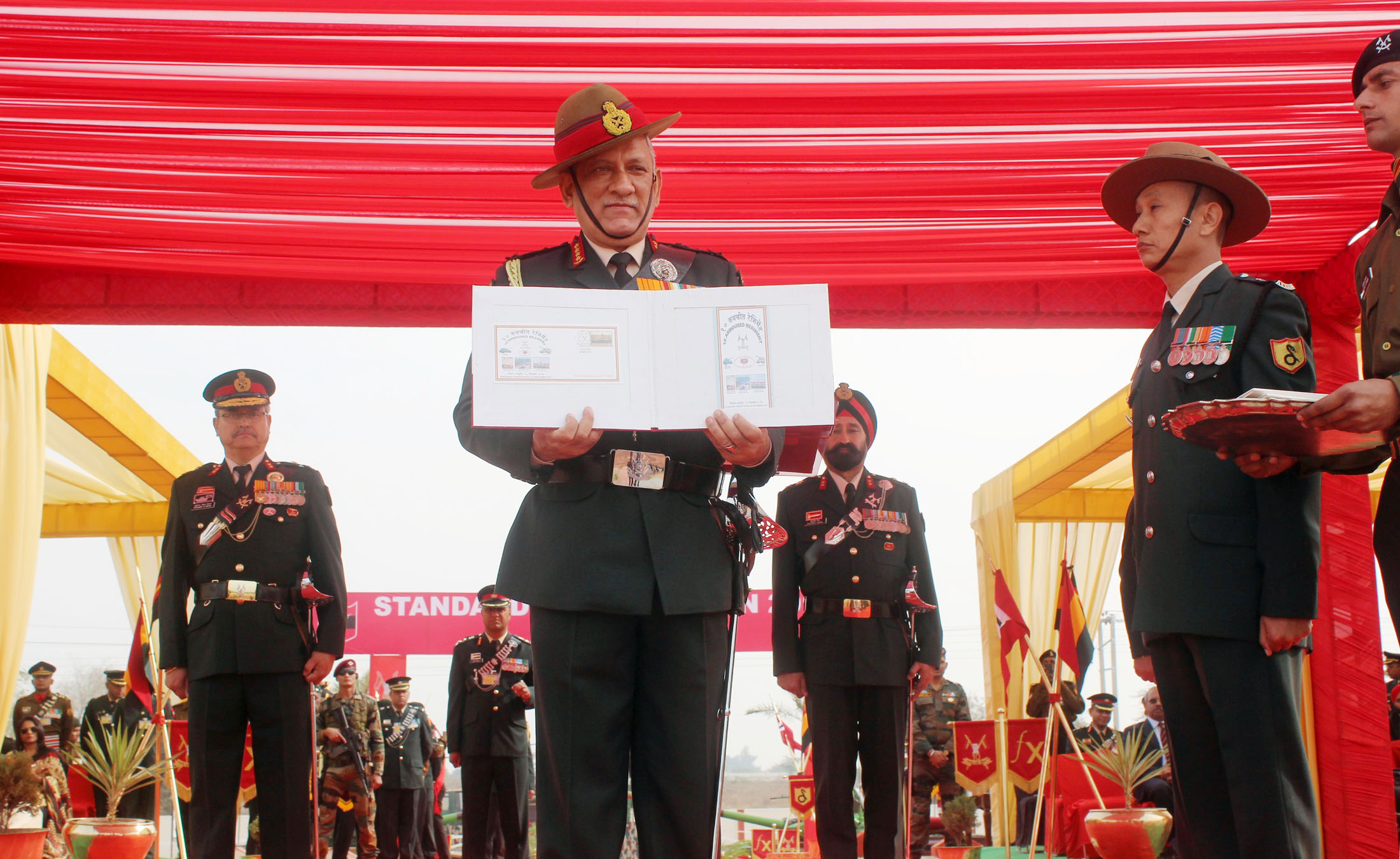
General Bipin Rawat releasing the 'first day cover' on the occasion of the Standard Presentation

Its first operational assignment however was at Samba, where it took part in Operation Trident in 1986. The regiment has also taken part in Operation Rakshak, Operation Vijay and Operation Parakram. Four Sena Medals and several Commendation Cards have been conferred on the regiment.

The Regiment was presented the ‘President’s Standards’ at Suratgarh on 5 December 2017 by General Bipin Rawat, Chief of the Army Staff, on behalf of the President of India, Mr Ram Nath Kovind

The Regiment is currently equipped with the T-72 tanks.

== Regimental Insignia ==
The cap badge of the unit has crossed lances and pennons, with the numeral '10' at the crossing, mounted with an armoured fist facing right. The regimental motto ('परम धर्म विजय') is inscribed on a scroll below in Devanagari script.
