= 46th Armoured Regiment (India) =

Indian Army regiment

46 Armoured Regiment
- Active: 1982 – present
- Country: India
- Allegiance: India
- Branch: Indian Army
- Type: Armoured Corps
- Size: Regiment
- Nickname: Thunderbolts
- Mottos: वज्र प्रहार प्रचंड वार; Vajra Prahar Prachand Vaar
- Equipment: T-72 tanks
- Decorations: Shaurya Chakra 1 Sena Medal 4 COAS Commendation Card 9 GOC-in-C Commendation Card 10

Commanders
- Colonel of the Regiment: Lieutenant General Devendra Sharma

Insignia
- Abbreviation: 46 Armd Regt

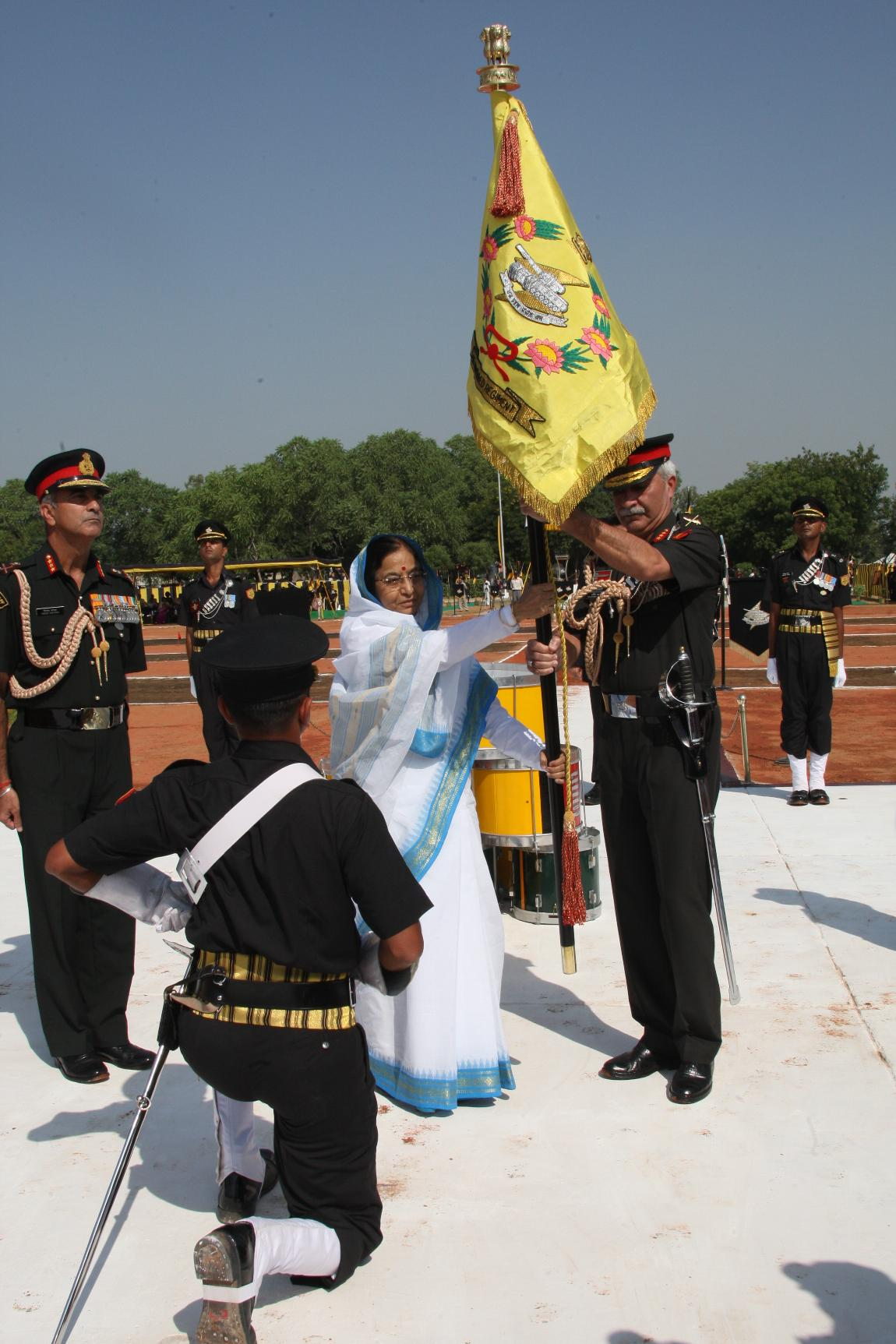
The President of India, Mrs Pratibha Patil during the Presentation of the Standard to 46 Armoured Regiment at Hisar in Haryana on 17 October 2008

46 Armoured Regiment is an armoured regiment of the Indian Army.

== Formation ==
46 Armoured Regiment was raised on 1 July 1982 at Ahmednagar. It has an all-India all-class composition, drawing troops from various castes and religions.

== History ==
The Regiment was presented the ‘President’s Standards’ at Hisar, Haryana on 17 October 2008 by the then President of India, Mrs. Prathiba Patil.

== Equipment ==
The Regiment had the Vijayanta tanks at raising. Since 2002, it has been equipped with the T-72 tanks.

== Operations ==
The regiment participated in Operation Bluestar soon after its formation. It has also taken part in Operation Trident, Operation Rakshak, Operation Vijay and Operation Parakram.

Major Ratan Kumar Sen was awarded the Shaurya Chakra for his gallant actions during counter terrorism operations in Anantnag, Jammu and Kashmir, while he was serving in 2 Rashtriya Rifles.

== Regimental Insignia ==
The Regimental insignia consists of a thunderbolt, overlaid with the Vijayanta tank and a scroll at the base with the regimental motto in Devanagari script.

The motto of the regiment is वज्र प्रहार प्रचंड वार (Vajra Prahar Prachand Vaar).
