= 84 Armoured Regiment (India) =

Indian Army regiment

- Active: 1976 – present
- Country: India
- Allegiance: India
- Branch: Indian Army
- Type: Armoured Corps
- Size: Regiment
- Motto: "Aham Veer Yudh Sthale"
- Colors: Dark Cherry and Black
- Equipment: T-72

Commanders
- Colonel of the Regiment: Lieutenant General Devendra Sharma

Insignia
- Abbreviation: 84 Armd Regt

84 Armoured Regiment is an armoured regiment of the Indian Army.

The regiment was raised on 1 July 1976 at the Remount Depot, Ahmednagar under the command of Lt Col Tarif Singh Dhiyia based on a ‘mixed class composition’ and equipped with Vijayanta tanks.

== History ==
The regiment had the honour of participating in the Republic Day parade in 1979 and the Army Day Parade in 2001. The regiment was presented the ‘President’s Standards’ at Mamun Military Station in Pathankot on 5 November 2014 by General Dalbir Singh, Chief of the Army Staff, on behalf of the President of India, Mr Pranab Mukherjee.

== Equipment ==
The regiment had the Vijayanta tanks at the time of raising. It converted to T-72 tanks in 1991.

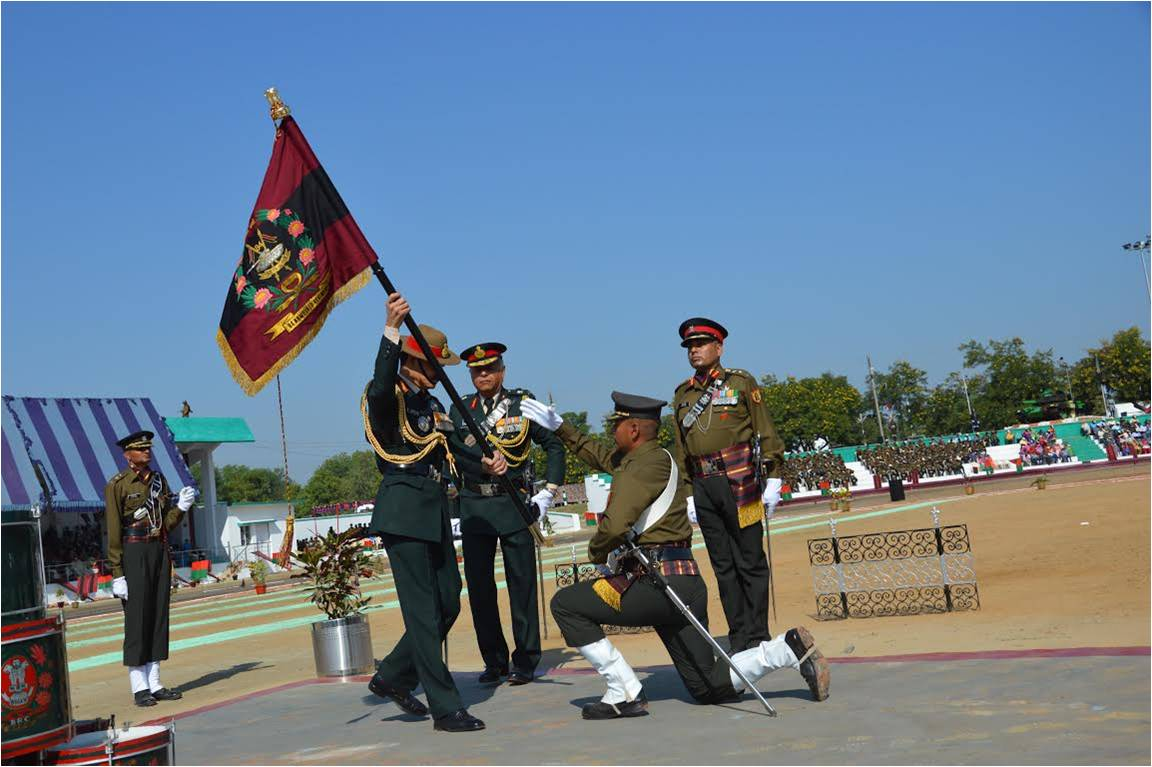
Presentation of the ‘President’s Standards’ by General Dalbir Singh, Chief of the Army Staff

== Operations ==
The regiment has been active in both the western and northern borders. It has participated in Operation Bluestar, Operation Woodrose, Operation Brasstacks, Operation Vijay, Operation Rakshak and Operation Parakram.

== Gallantry awards ==
The regiment has won the following gallantry awards –

- Sena Medal - 1
- Mentioned in dispatches - 1
- Chief of Army Staff Commendation Cards - 5

For distinguished service, it has won –

- Param Vishisht Seva Medal (PVSM) - 1
- Ati Vishisht Seva Medal (AVSM) - 2
- Vishisht Seva Medal (VSM) - 1
- Chief of Army Staff Commendation Cards - 15
- GOC-in-C Commendation Cards - 20
- CISC Commendation Cards - 2
- Vice Chief of Army Staff Commendation Cards - 2

== Regimental Insignia ==
The Regimental badge comprises a westward facing Vijayanta tank with level gun, signifying readiness for battle against a background of crossed lances signifying the Cavalry heritage. The colours of the regiment are Cherry Red (signifies thick bonds of common blood) over Black (the universal colour of the Armoured Corps, signifies strength of character and personality). The colours taken together signifies ‘the ascendency of Armour over the art of modern warfare’. The Regimental motto is “Aham Veer Yudh Sthale” which means “I am the brave of the battlefield”.

== Infantry Affiliation ==
84 Armoured Regiment and the Bihar Regiment were the first Regiments in the Army to be affiliated in 1996.

== Notable personnel ==
Capt Bharat Verma, the founder of Lancer Publishers and Indian Defence Review has served in this regiment.
