= Armoured corps =

An armoured corps (also mechanized corps or tank corps) is a specialized military organization whose role is to conduct armoured warfare. The units belonging to an armoured corps include military staff, and are equipped with tanks and other armoured fighting vehicles, as well as supporting vehicles.

The term may refer to two different types of organizations:

1. A state's top-level branch of the army which serves as the umbrella for all of its specialized armoured formations
2. Any of the corps-sized formations within a ground forces that are composed chiefly of military units serving in the armoured role

== List of armoured corps ==
The armoured, tank, or mechanized corps of various nations' armed forces during different time periods include:

- Royal Australian Armoured Corps
- Royal Canadian Armoured Corps
- Bangladesh Army Armoured Corps
- British Indian Armoured Corps (until 1947)
- Indian Army Armoured Corps
- Israeli Armored Corps
- Egyptian Armored Corps
- Royal New Zealand Armoured Corps
- Pakistan Armoured Corps
- Panzerwaffe, Nazi Germany
- Russian Tank Troops
- Sri Lanka Armoured Corps
- Swedish Armoured Troops
- Armour, Singapore
- Royal Armoured Corps, United Kingdom
- Ukrainian Armoured Forces
- Tank Corps, United States (until 1920)
- Armor Branch, United States

== Corps-size armoured formations ==
Armoured, tank, or mechanized corps-sized formations (typically composed of divisions and belonging to a field army), include:

- Malaysian Royal Armoured Corps
- Rhodesian Armoured Corps
- Mechanised corps (Soviet Union)
- Tank Corps (Soviet Union), a type of Red Army formation used up to World War II
- Tank Corps, later Royal Tank Corps, early name of the Royal Tank Regiment (UK)
- I Armored Corps, United States

== See also ==
- Armoured warfare
- Panzer corps
- Mechanized corps
