= Jintu Gogoi =

Indian army officer, Vir Chakra recipient (1970–1999)

Captain Jintu Gogoi VrC
- জিন্টু গগৈ
- Born: 21 November 1970; Khumtai, ASSAM, India
- Died: 30 June 1999 (aged 28); Kargil, India
- Education: Gandhi Memorial National College; Indian Military Academy
- Military career
- Allegiance: India
- Branch: Indian Army
- Service years: 1995–1999
- Rank: Captain
- Service number: SS-36261
- Unit: 17 Garhwal Rifles
- Conflicts: Kargil War †
- Awards: Vir Chakra

Jintu Gogoi (21 November 1970 – 30 June 1999), VrC was an Indian Army officer of 17 Garhwal Rifles. Gogoi was posthumously awarded the Vir Chakra, India's third highest wartime military decoration, for his courage and bravery in combat during operations in the Kargil War in 1999.

== Early life and military career ==
Captain Jintu Gogoi is the son of Duluprabha Gogoi and Flying officer Thogiram Gogoi, an Indian Air Force Veteran. Jintu Gogoi's father Thogiram Gogoi stated that his son Jintu always wanted to join the Indian Army.

After graduation from Gandhi Memorial National College, Jintu Gogoi joined Officers Training Academy, Chennai on 9 May 1994, and was commissioned into the 17th Battalion of the Garhwal Rifles on 11 March 1995.

Before joining Kargil war, Gogoi took Mhow, YO, Winter Warfare, and Commando trainings.

== Kargil War ==
Just after his marriage engagement, Gogoi had to rush to Kargil as the war declared and was deployed in the Batalik Sector of Kargil.

On 29 June 1999, Captain Jintu Gogoi took charge of the mission to evict the enemy from the northern heights of the western flanks on Jubar Ridge, an area overlooking Jubar top, astride the National Highway (NH 1) in the Batalik Sector. All the companies, except the platoon led by Captain Gogoi, exposed to enemy during the daytime, thus he decided to move at night which also entailed an arduous climb of nearly 1 km. Captain Gogoi led his troops to the top of the ridge, however, they were spotted by the enemy and were subsequently surrounded. Gogoi launched an immediate attack on the enemy, killing two intruders in hand-to-hand combat, being mortally wounded in the process. He received a full burst from a machine gun in his solar plexus but he continued firing till he collapsed. He soon succumbed to injuries and his body was found barely 150 yards from the picket on Jubar Top.

Besides Captain Gogoi, eleven other soldiers of 17 Garhwal Rifles laid down their lives during this entire operation viz. Naik Shiv Singh, Lance Naik Madan Singh, Lance Naik Devendra Prasad, Lance Naik Dinesh Datt, Rfn Birendra Lal, Rfn Amit Negi, Rfn Vijay Singh, Rfn JS Bhandari, Rfn Ranjeet Singh, Rfn SC Sati and Rfn Bhagwan Singh.

Though Gogoi's platoon, under command, evicted the enemy, but he had to pay for the victory with his supreme sacrifice. Captain Jintu Gogoi got recognised for his bravery with a gallantry award, “Vir Chakra” posthumously. The battalion was awarded Battle Honour ‘Batalik’ for its exploits in Operation Vijay. The 17th Garhwal Battalion was also awarded Theatre Honour ‘Kargil’. Back in Gogoi's native town, there was an emotional funeral of Captain Gogoi, as the major insurgent outfit ULFA called Army officers and personnel in the Indian Army to avoid the Kargil War.

== Vir Chakra ==
As described in Gogoi's Vir Chakra award citation:

On the night of 29–30 June 99 during Operation Vijay, Captain Jintu Gogoi was tasked to evict the enemy from Ridge Line Kala Pathar near Line of Control in general area of Juber Hill complex in Batalik Sub-Sector.

With utter disregard to his personal safety, he led the troops in the face of heavy volume of fire and reached the top by night. However, he was immediately surrounded by the enemy. Captain Jintu Gogoi was asked to surrender by the enemy, as he had no chance to protect himself. Keeping utmost his loyalty to the unit, he chose the honourable way of fighting with valour and dignity. Captain Jintu Gogoi opened fire on the enemy killing two enemy soldiers before making his supreme sacrifice for the Nation. Before this action, he made sure that his group had taken cover for safety.

== Garhwal Rifle on Jintu Gogoi ==
The Wiki page of Garhwal Rifles (See Kargil War Section) cited a note with disappointment about supreme sacrifice of Capt Jintu Gogoi with and others of Garhwal Rifles for their Heroism in Kargil War, with the citation:

The 17th Battalion was in the Batalik sub-sector and was tasked with assaulting Area Bump and Kalapathar in the Jubar Heights, a ridgeline overlooking Jubar top, astride the National Highway. The climb was arduous and all companies were ‘daylighted’ except for Capt Jintu Gogoi's platoon. The gallant ‘Bhullas’ took Kalapathar in the face of heavy enemy fire, and then came face to face with an enemy UMG emplacement. To the enemy's total surprise, Capt Gogoi launched an immediate attack on the UMG sangar, killing two intruders in hand-to-hand combat, being mortally wounded in the process. Capt Jintu Gogoi was awarded the Vir Chakra posthumously for his bravery in utter disregard for his own safety, but sadly his name is not much known between the people like Captain Vikram Batra, who was also a Kargil martyr. The battalion launched fresh attacks in the subsequent days and took Bump and Kalapathar. This paved the way for further successes – the battalion proceeded to take another dominating feature in the Muntho Dhalo complex, finally taking Point 5285 despite heavy snowfall and effective enemy fire including artillery fire due to the proximity of this feature to the LOC. The battalion was awarded Battle Honour ‘Batalik’ for its exploits in Op Vijay. Gallantry Awards received by the battalion were one Vir Chakra and one Mentioned-in-Despatches. In addition, was also awarded GOC-in-C Northern Command Unit Appreciation to the unit for their splendid work

== Honours ==
- Assam government posthumously awarded the state's highest bravery award Bir Chilarai Award in 2008.
- In honour of Martyr Jintu Gogoi, Joya Gogoi College of Golaghat, from where Gogoi studied his pre-university, named the library as a mark of respect to the Kargil Martyr Capt. Jintu Gogoi.
- The Indian Army organizes Captain Jintu Gogoi, VrC Memorial Football Tournament every year.
- Jintu Gogoi is the first Assamese in Indian Army who sacrificed supreme in Kargil War.
- 2020 Tokyo Olympics Indian boxer Lovlina Borgohain uses to pay her salute before she attempts any International game.

== See also ==
- Kargil War
- Vikram Batra
- Manoj Kumar Pandey
