= 173 Medium Regiment (India) =

Indian Army artillery unit

- Active: 1967 – present
- Country: India
- Allegiance: India
- Branch: Indian Army
- Type: Artillery
- Size: Regiment
- Mottos: Sarvatra, Izzat-O-Iqbal (Everywhere with Honour and Glory)
- Colors: Red & Navy Blue
- Anniversaries: 15 February – Raising Day

Insignia
- Abbreviation: 173 Med Regt

173 Medium Regiment is part of the Regiment of Artillery of the Indian Army.

== Formation and history ==
The regiment was raised as 173 Field Regiment on 15 February 1967 at Napier Lines, Secunderabad. It was then part of 54 Artillery Brigade of 54 Infantry Division. The first commanding officer was Lieutenant Colonel Daljit Singh and the troop composition was of Brahmin soldiers. The regiment was equipped with the Soviet made 100 mm Field Guns in November 1967.

== Operations ==
The regiment has taken part in the following operations –

Indo-Pakistani War of 1971

The regiment took part in Operation Cactus Lily in the Jammu sector. It was part of 26 Artillery Brigade and equipped with 100 mm guns. It bought accurate fire in support of 6 Garhwal Rifles during the Battle of Nawanpind. During Operation Chicken Neck, it supported 19 Infantry Brigade.

Other operations

- Internal security duties (Tripura) – The regiment was called in 1982 to control communal riots in Tripura. During the operations, two officers and one NCO were awarded COAS Commendation Cards.
- Operation Trident – 1986-1987
- Internal security duties (Gujarat) – The regiment was deployed to Banaskantha and Mehsana districts to maintain law and order following the 1992 demolition of the Babri Masjid.
- Operation Rakshak – September 1995 – December 1999. The unit saw action in the difficult high altitude areas of Northern Gullies and Machil sector of Jammu and Kashmir. It had six observer posts at the Line of Control and was involved in artillery fire against the Pakistani posts. It was also involved in anti-terrorist operations. It lost Lance Naik SC Joshi and Gunner Satish during these operations. It then saw counter terrorist operations in Jammu and Kashmir between December 2000 and December 2001, during which five terrorists were killed. The unit lost Lieutenant Gautam Jain and Naik Bhagwan Singh on 1 November 2001 during anti-terrorist operations. Both were posthumously awarded the Sena Medal.
- Operation Vijay – The regiment was located at Mamun Cantonment at Pathankot between 22 June and 22 November 1999.
- Operation Sahayata – Following the 2011 Sikkim earthquake, the regiment was involved in relief and rescue operations.

== Gallantry awards ==
The regiment has won the following gallantry awards –

- Shaurya Chakra – Gunner Keshav Dayal, awarded posthumously for his bravery against dacoits near Shahjahanpur in 1968.
- Sena Medal – 2 (Lieutenant Gautam Jain and Naik Bhagwan Singh)
- Chief of Army Staff Commendation Cards - 4 (Major Abhinav Dobal, Havildar Sudheer Kumar)
- Vice Chief of Army Staff Commendation cards – Gunner Janmejai Tiwari

== War Cry ==
The war cry of the regiment is ‘Nara Ye Bajrang Bali, Har Har Mahadev, Sarvada Vijay, Baba Parshuram Ki Jai, Amar Shaheed Gautam Bhagwan Ki Jai’.

== See also ==
- List of artillery regiments of Indian Army
