= Battle of Nawanpind =

Battle during 1971 Indo-Pakistan war

- Part of Indo-Pakistani war of 1971
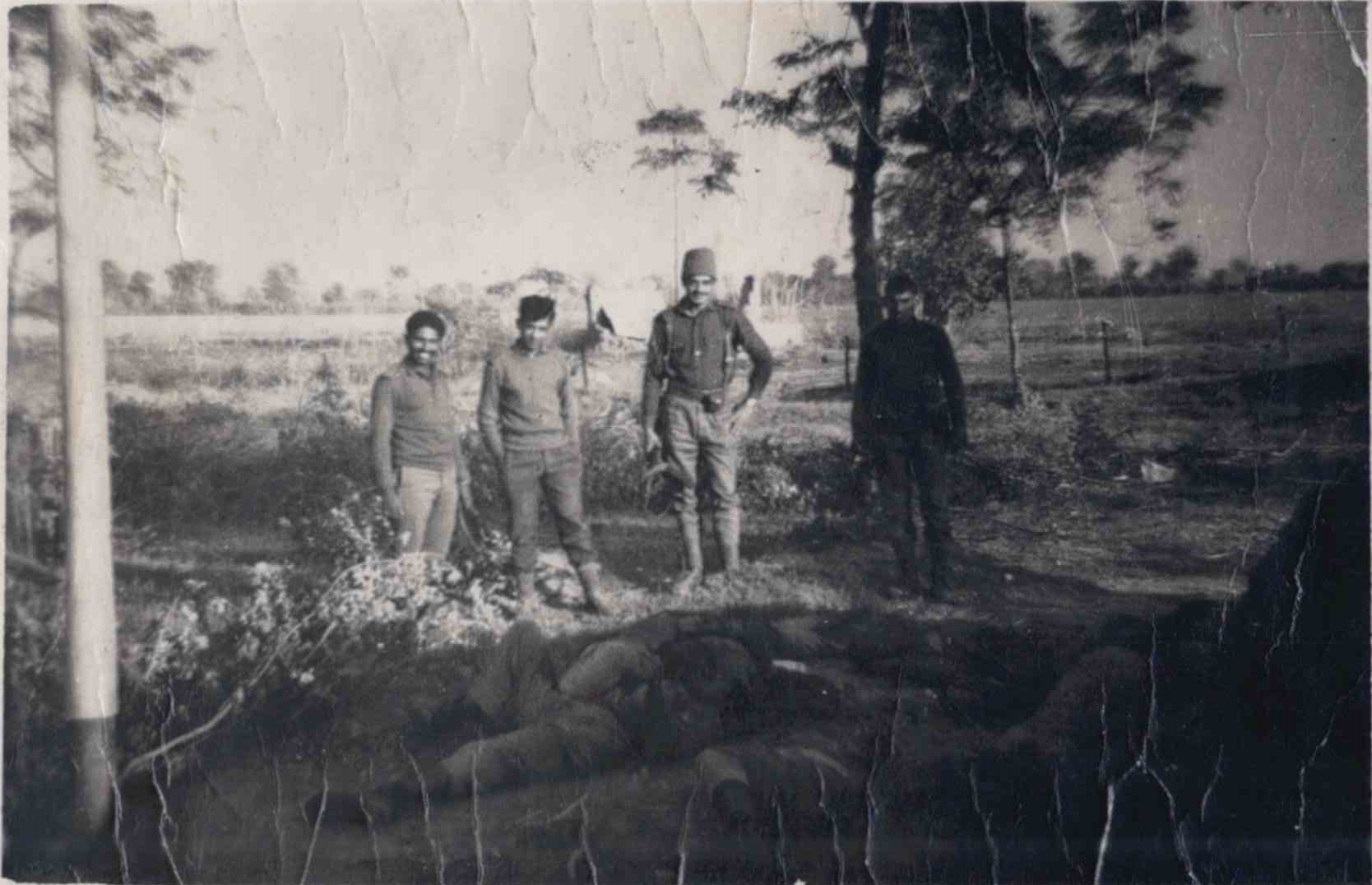
- Officers of 6 Garhwal Rifles at Nawanpind post, with Pakistani casualties in the foreground.
Date	December 04–05, 1971 (1 day) (Main battle); December 10–14, 1971 (4 days) (Subsequent raids by India into Pakistani territory)
Location	Nawanpind, Ranbir Singh Pura, Jammu and Kashmir 32.535558°N 74.699165°E
Result	Indian victory

Belligerents
India	Pakistan

Commanders and leaders
(India) Maj Gen Zorawar Chand Bakhshi (India) Brig A Rama Swami (India) Lt Col AK Moorthy	(Pakistan) Maj Gen Abid Ali Zahid

Units involved
26 Infantry Division: 6th Battalion, Garhwal Rifles.; 3rd Battalion, 3 Gorkha Rifles (From December 10); 8th Light Cavalry; 173 Field Regiment and 220 Medium Regiment	15 Infantry Division: 37th Battalion, Frontier Force Regiment; 8 Medium Regiment; 7th Engineer Regiment

Strength
1 Rifle Platoon; 1 Commando Platoon; 01 Vijayanta tank squadron (less two troops); 02 Field Gun Batteries	120+ Infantry troops (Company); 4 MMG detachments; 1 Engineer detachment; 02 Field Gun Batteries

Casualties and losses
4 dead; 6 wounded (1 JCO and 5 other ranks)	19 dead; 18 POWs (3 JCOs and 15 other ranks); Weapons and equipment (captured by India); 4 MMGs; 3 Sten guns; 30 Heckler & Koch G3 rifles; 2 wireless radio sets

The Battle of Nawanpind was a key engagement fought between Indian and Pakistani forces during the Indo-Pakistani war of 1971 in the state of Jammu and Kashmir. In the battle, troops of the 6th Garhwal Rifles successfully recaptured the Jogne Chak and Nawanpind posts from Pakistani forces after intense close-quarter combat on December 5, 1971.

The operation, marked by exceptional bravery, most notably by Rifleman Makar Singh Negi and Dafadar Prithi Singh, who were posthumously awarded the Vir Chakra, inflicted heavy casualties on the enemy. Following this success, Indian forces conducted multiple raids across the border in Pakistani border towns before the ultimate ceasefire on December 16, 1971.

== Background ==
The Indo-Pakistani war of 1971, also known as the third Indo-Pakistani war, was a military confrontation between India and Pakistan that occurred during the Bangladesh Liberation War in West Pakistan from 3 December 1971 until the Pakistani capitulation in Dhaka on 16 December 1971. The war began with Pakistan's Operation Chengiz Khan, consisting of preemptive aerial strikes on eight Indian Air Force stations along India's western front. The strikes led to India declaring war on Pakistan, marking their entry into the war for Bangladesh's independence, on the side of Bengali nationalist forces. India's entry expanded the existing conflict with Indian and Pakistani forces engaging on both the eastern and western fronts.

=== Western Front ===
While in the Eastern front, Pakistan was mostly limited to a defensive war by Indian and Mukti Bahini forces, Pakistan sought to make several attacking thrusts along the western front into Indian states of Jammu and Kashmir, Rajasthan and Punjab to divert Indian Armed Forces from East Pakistan. Thus, on the western front, India mostly adopted a holding strategy. The Indian objective was not to aggressively push into West Pakistan but to contain Pakistani forces and remain dug in. Thus, in most of the sectors - except Chhamb - Pakistani forces were not able to make any significant or strategic gains.

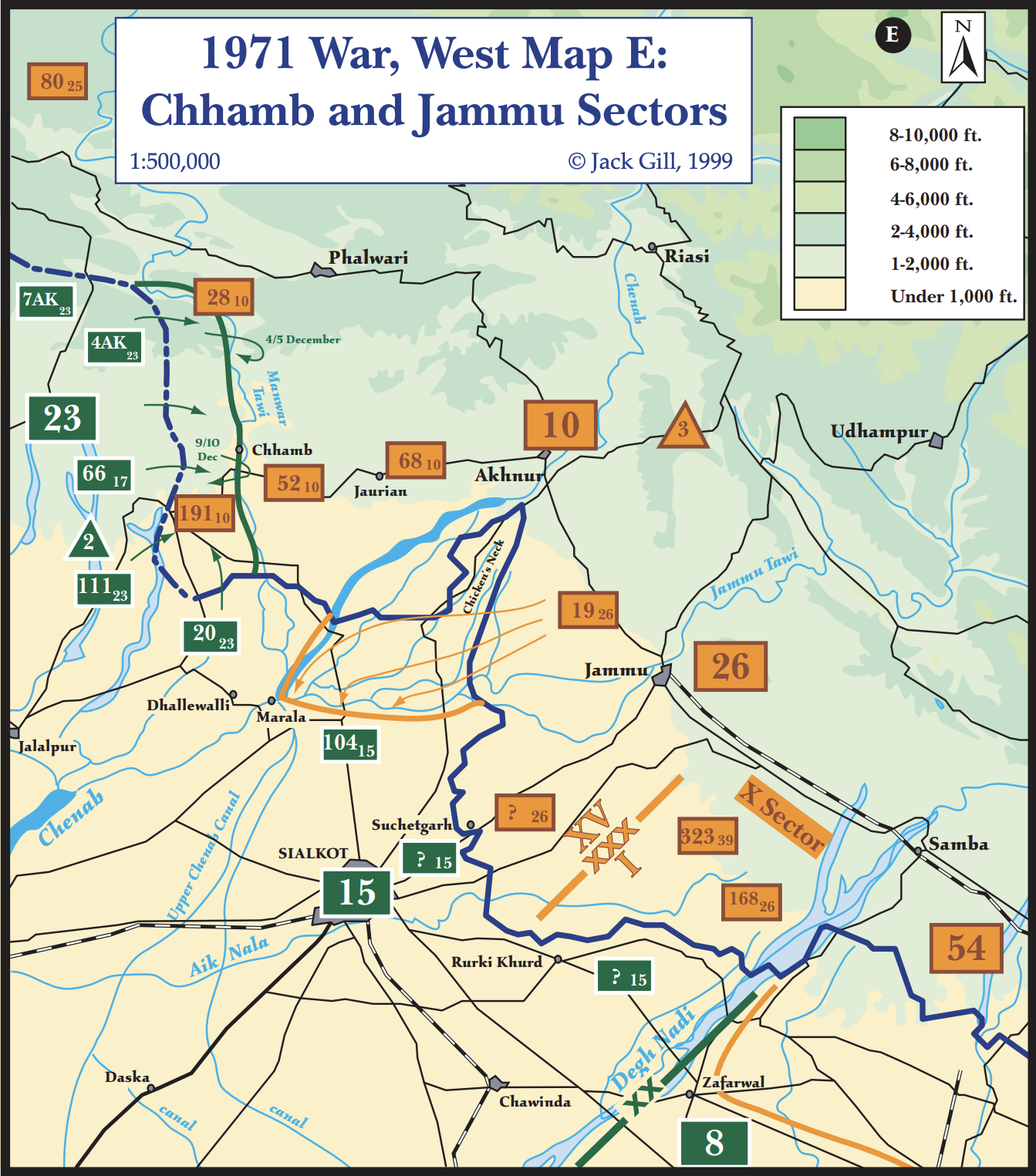
Map showcasing the positions and advances of Indian as well Pakistani forces in the Chhamb-Jammu sector during 1971.

Pakistan's most significant advance came in the Chhamb sector, where it revisited a battlefield from the 1965 war to threaten one of India's key overland links to Kashmir and to deprive India of a launching pad for potential offensive operations. These advances yielded Pakistan its most decisive and effectively the only success of the war in its victory in the crucial Battle of Chhamb, which started on December 3.

On the same day, Pakistani forces had also moved into the Ranbir Singh Pora sector, just south of Chhamb. While Pakistan had hoped to make simultaneous gains in this sector as well, the plans fell flat and the ultimate result was the exact opposite to that of Chhamb. Initially on December 4, the Pakistani advance failed in the Suchetgarh sub-sector with their defeat in the Battle of Nawanpind and ultimately on December 6, India moved swiftly to capture the strategically important Chicken's Neck or the Akhnoor Dagger

=== Ranbir Singh Pora Sector ===
The primary responsibility of defending the RS Pora sector was given to 26 Infantry Division, under Maj Gen Zorawar Chand Bakhshi. The division's area of responsibility spanned from Chenab river, just south of Chhamb sector, in the north to Degh Nadi, north of Samba town, in the south.

The division had three brigades under its command in addition to other support arms. These were: -

- 19 Infantry Brigade
- 162 Infantry Brigade
- 36 Infantry Brigade

Of these, 19 Infantry Brigade was engaged in the assault on the Akhnoor Dagger or Chicken's Neck. 36 Infantry Brigade was the division's reserve force and finally, 162 Infantry Brigade was positioned along the border from Suchetgarh outpost to the northern banks of Degh Nadi, thereby deployed as the right flank of I Corps, protecting the area from the Degh Nadi to the left flank of 26 Division at Samba.

=== Deployment of Indian Forces ===
==== Defended Area 1 ====
In October, deteriorating relations with Pakistan compelled India to take precautionary measures against a surprise attack. As the 162 Infantry Brigade was located on the direct route to Sialkot, it was alerted to prepare and occupy its main defensive positions covering that axis. The brigade commander, Brigadier A Ramaswamy, then ordered 6 Garhwal Rifles to move to its proposed defended area (D1) on the evening of the 12th October. This area was located between Jammu city and Ranbir Singh Pora town.

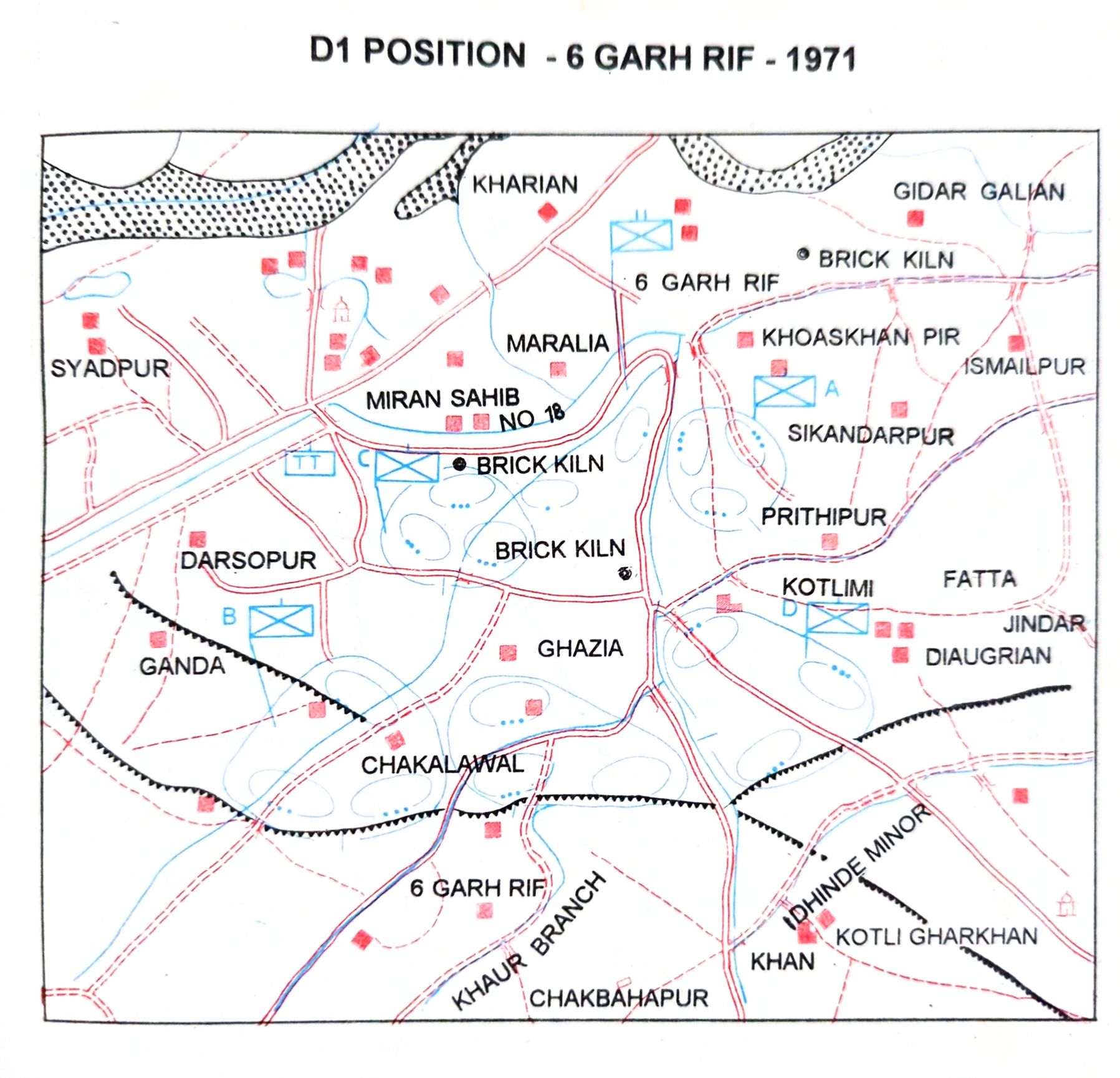
D1 of the 6 Garhwal Rifles under 162 Infantry Brigade. It spanned across towns like Miran Sahib, Chakalwal and Kharian.

The battalion completed the development of defences by the morning of 15 October. On 27 October it was ordered to reconnoitre and prepare another defended area (D2) with its screen behind the line of BSF border outposts, southwest of D1.

==== Defended Area 2 ====
After moving to the second area, the battalion started preparing its defences. Digging of trenches was started on the night October 28 and was done only during the hours of darkness. By 12 November the defences were ready.

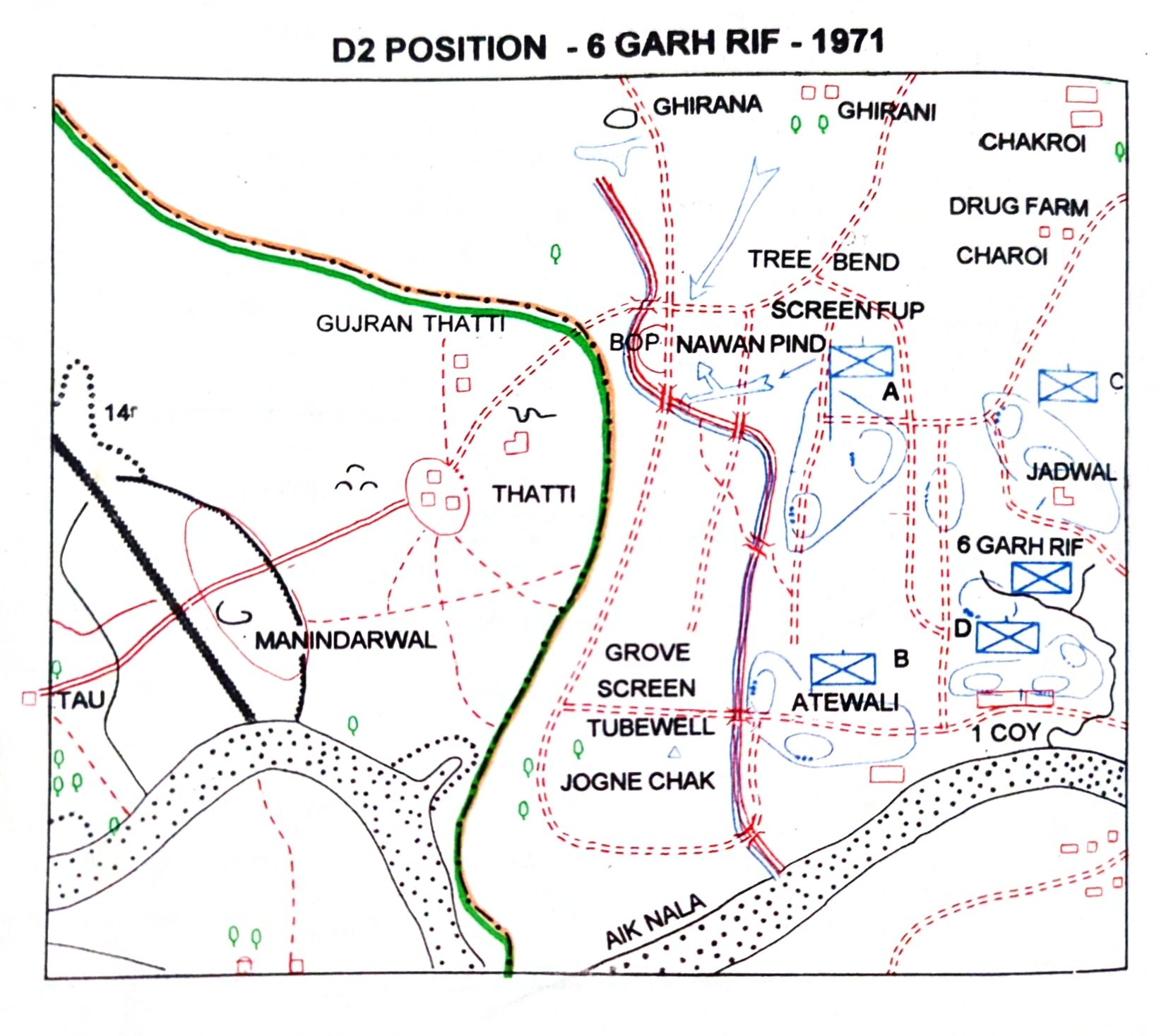
D2 of 6 Garhwal Rifles under 162 Infantry Brigade. It was at D2 that the final battle took place.

By the beginning of December, Pakistan had concentrated a large number of troops in the Sialkot Sector, which was under their 15 Infantry Division commanded by Major General Abid Ali Zahid. On the orders of India's 26 Infantry Division commander, Major General Zorawar Chand Bakhshi, 6 Garhwal Rifles moved forward to its D2 position on the night 2nd/3 December and occupied it.

== Battle ==
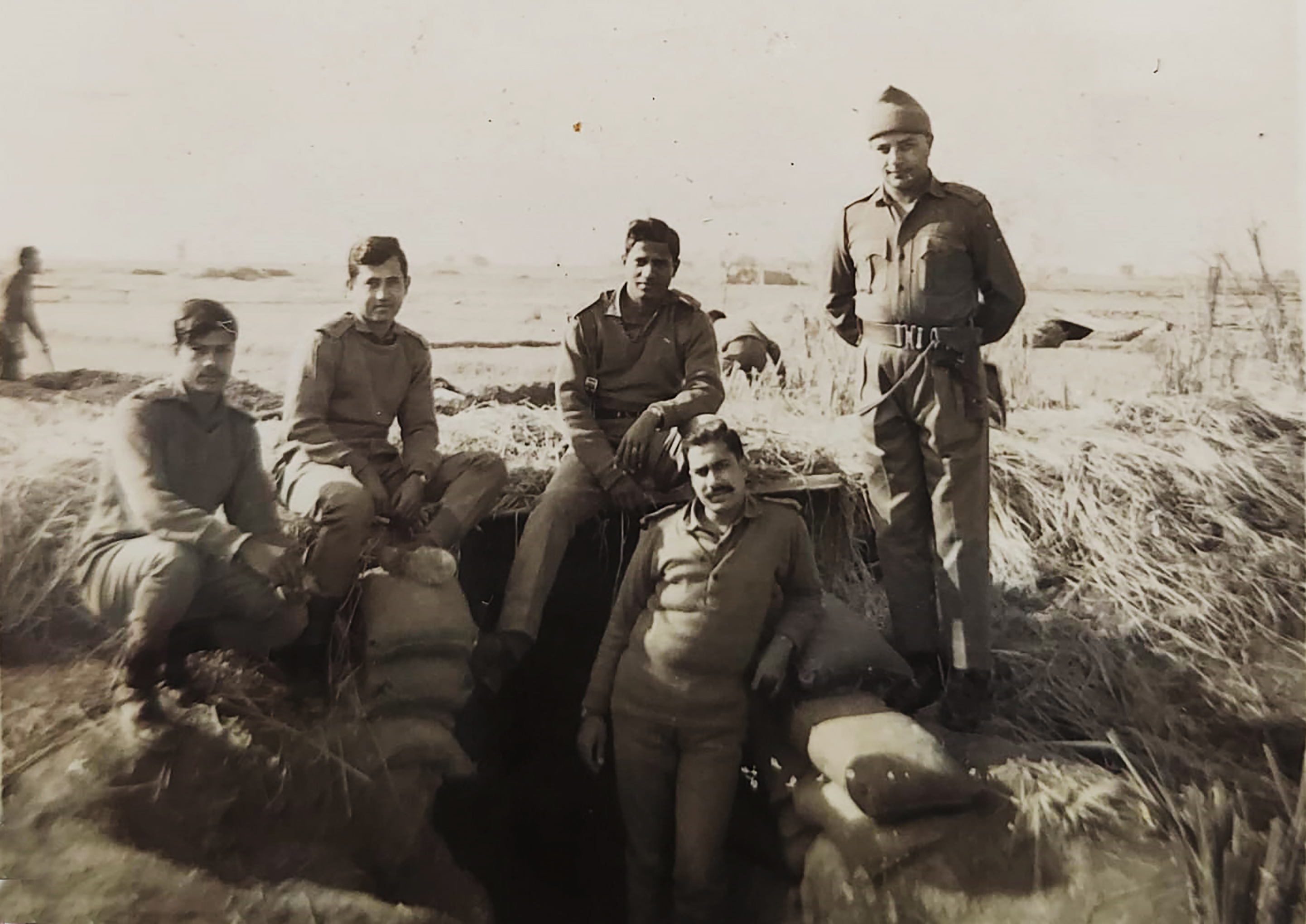
Officers of 6 Garhwal Rifles pose in front of their trenches in Ranbir Singh Pora sector near Jammu. (From left to right: Capt CR Ramachandran, Capt PK Sinha, Maj NC Guha, Capt DK Aggarwal and Lt Col AK Moorthy)

As per the standard operating practice during wars with Pakistan, the Border Security Force hands over border outposts manned by them to the Army and then serves as support forces under the command of Indian Army formations.

On the night of 2nd/3 December, BSF vacated two border outposts in the RS Pora sector namely Jogne Chak and Nawanpind, both south of the Suchetgarh town. However, these posts were not immediately taken over by the Indian Army and thus remained empty for nearly twenty-four hours.

The reason for this is either attributed to miscommunication between Army and BSF channels or to the fact that BSF had vacated the posts to "provide a no-man's land and ample space for our patrols to operate freely." Either way, this action proved to be a mistake by India and an opportunity to Pakistan.

Taking advantage of the situation, on the night of 04/5 December, Pakistani troops of the Sialkot-based 15th Infantry Division intruded into Indian territory and occupied both Nawanpind and Jogne Chak border outposts with a Section each.

The first report of enemy movements was given by 6 Garhwal Rifles' screening force - under Second Lieutenant RK Tandon - deployed nearly 600 meters before Nawanpind.

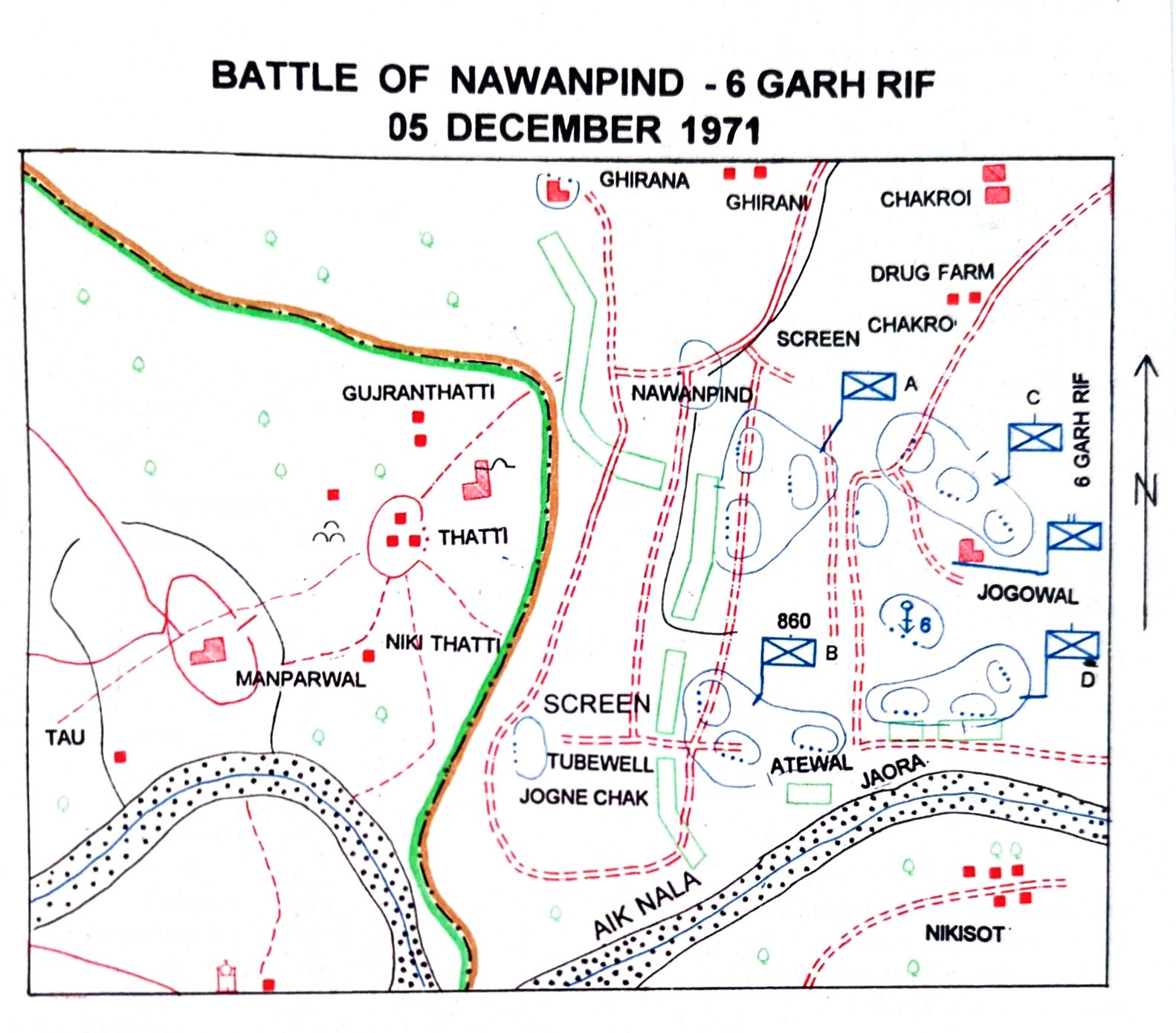
Map showcasing the Indian border outposts of Nawanpind and Jogne Chak, along with the positions of 6 Garhwal Rifles.

On learning about the capture, Lt Col AK Moorthy sent an aggressive patrol party under Subedar Gopal Dutt Joshi within a few hours, to recapture Jogne Chak first. The swift action by the patrol party enabled the recapture of Jogne Chak in the early hours of December 5.

However, by the morning of December 5, Pakistan had heavily reinforced the Nawanpind Post by a company of troops from the 37th Frontier Force Regiment and 7th Engineer Regiment, supported by four Medium Machine Gun (MMG) detachments and medium artillery of 8 Medium Regiment.

Despite the reinforcements and rear artillery support from the Pakistani side, 2Lt Tandon's screening force was able to maintain position and more importantly refrain the Pakistani forces from probing the battalion's defence lines and advancing further into Indian territory.

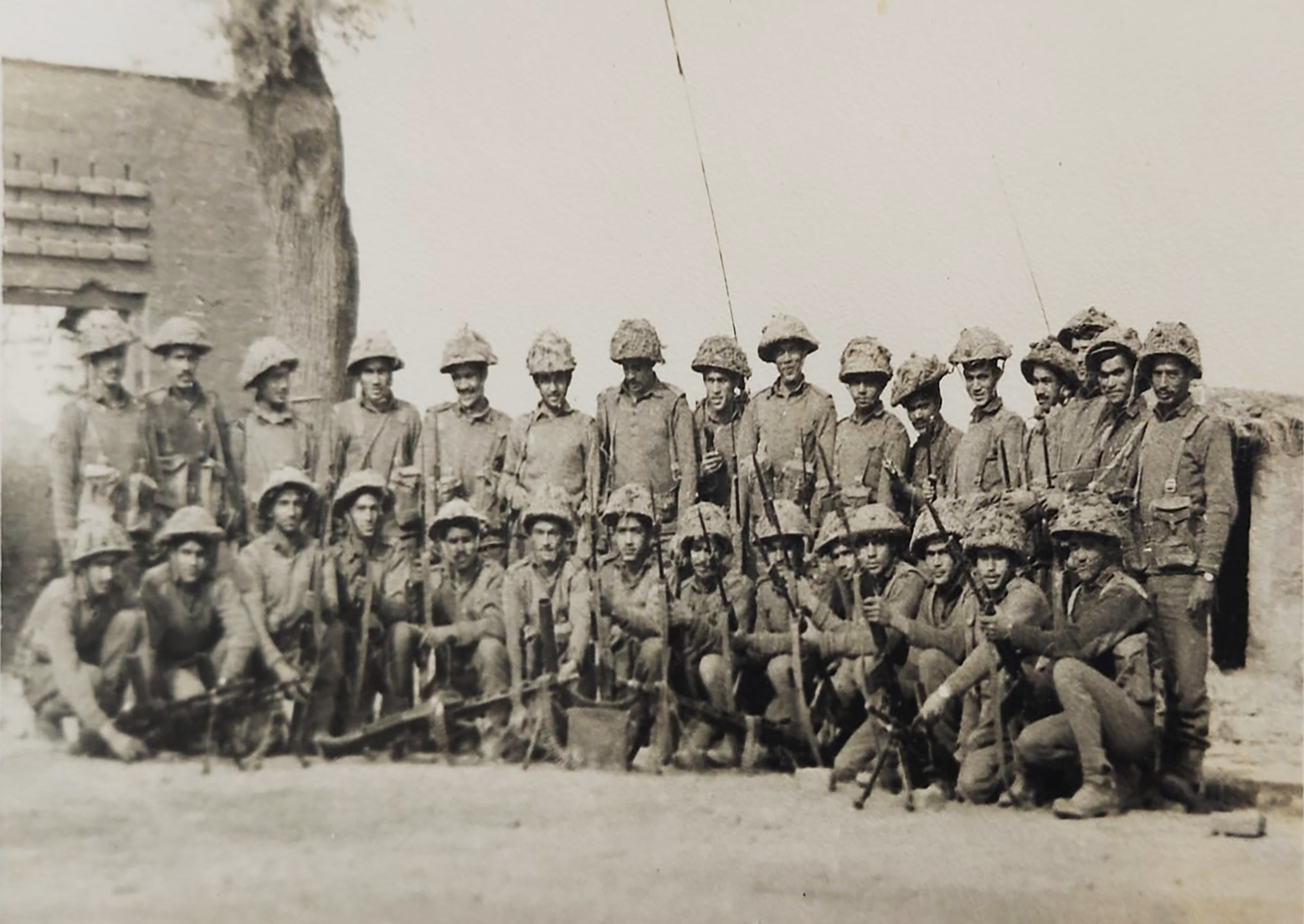
Commando Platoon of 6 Garhwal Rifles under Captain PK Sinha at Nawanpind.

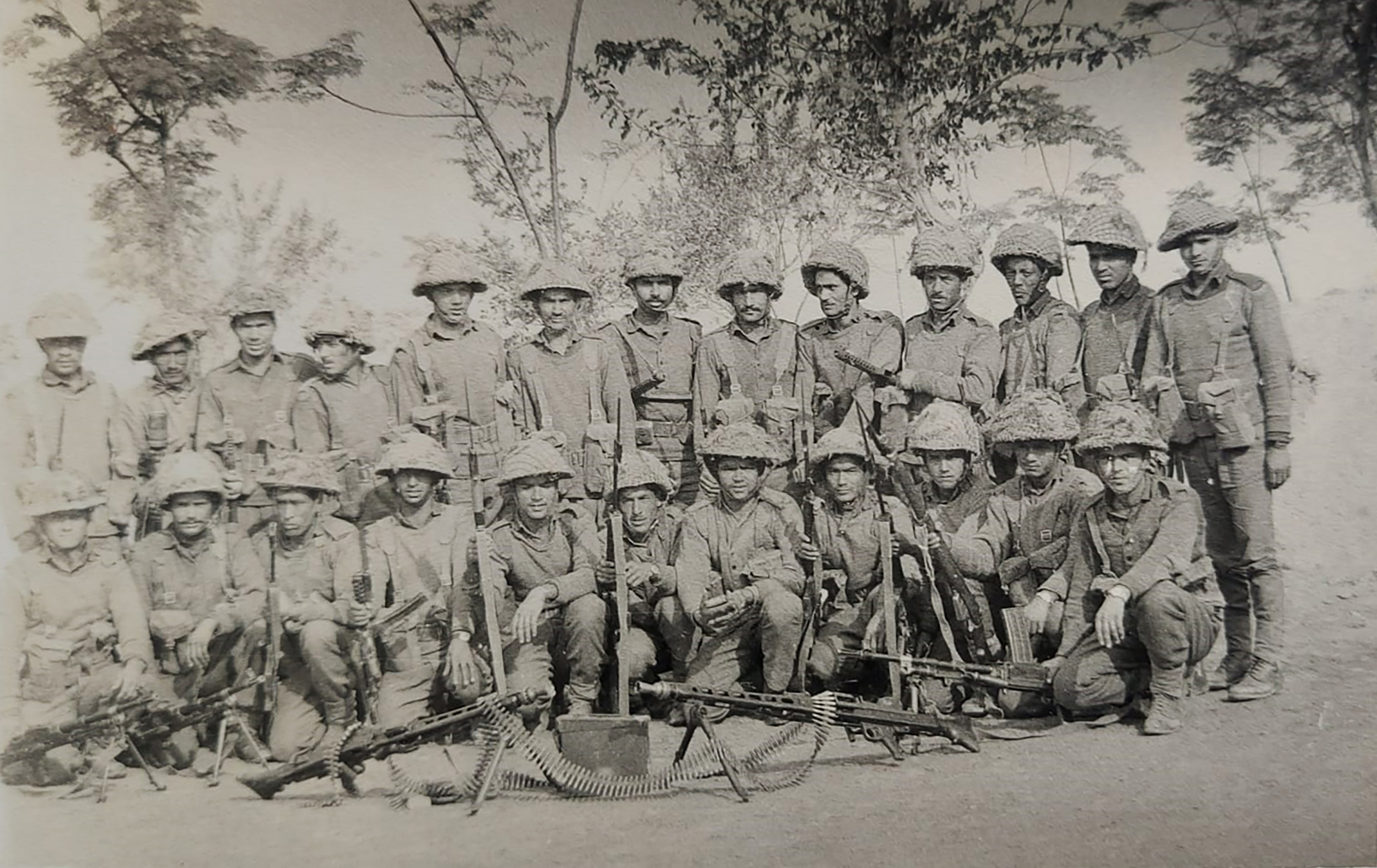
Rifle Platoon of 6 Garhwal Rifles under 2Lt GS Rathore at Nawanpind.

To deter Pakistani forces from digging in, a day attack was planned to recapture the Nawanpind Post with two platoons of 6 Garhwal Rifles. One was a regular platoon under 2Lt GS Rathore and the other was the Commando Platoon under Captain PK Sinha. They were supported by a Squadron of 8th Light Cavalry less two troops, a battery each from 173rd Field Regiment and 220th Medium Regiment.

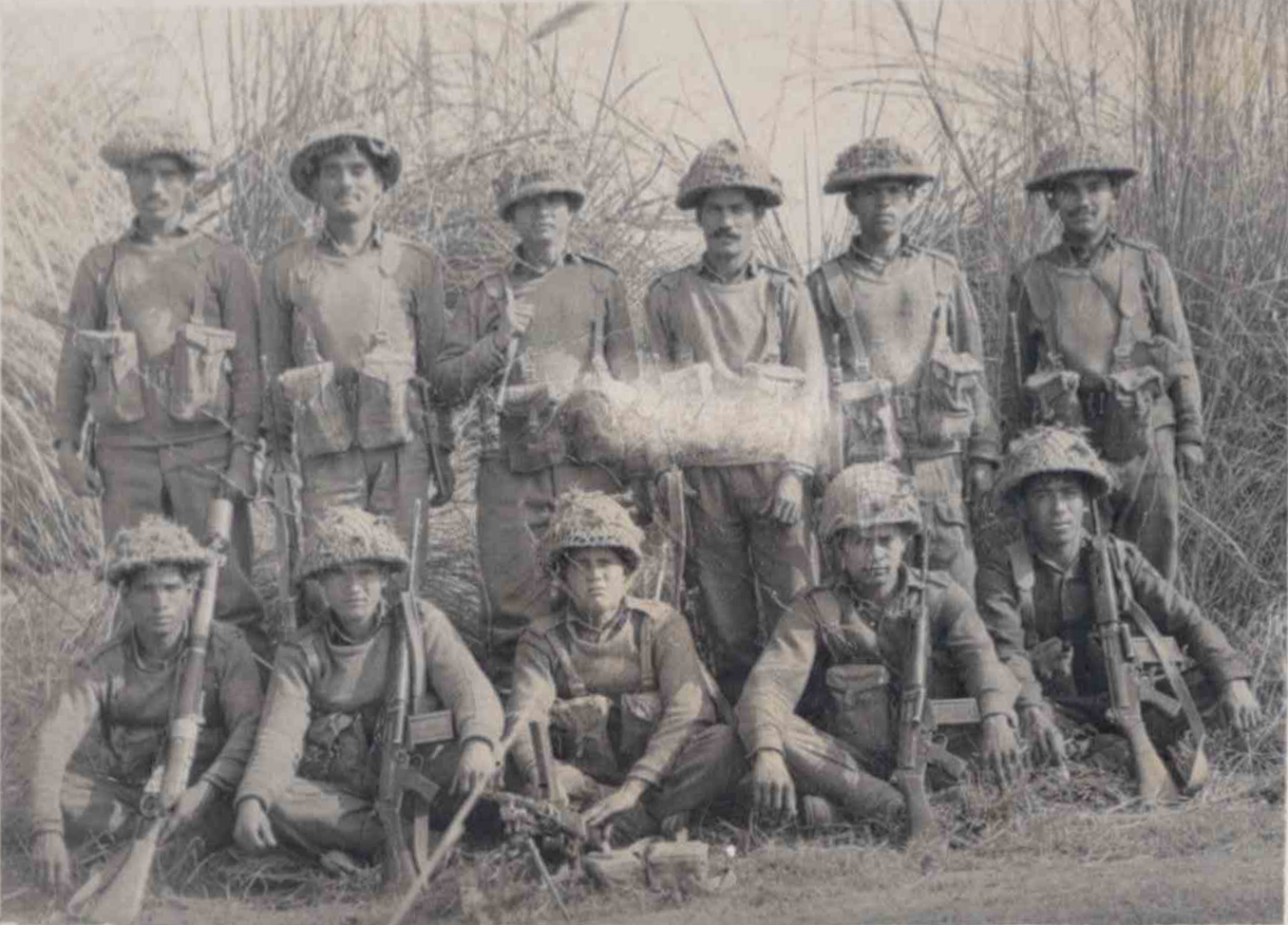
The fire support group of the 6 Garhwal Rifles for the Battle of Nawanpind.

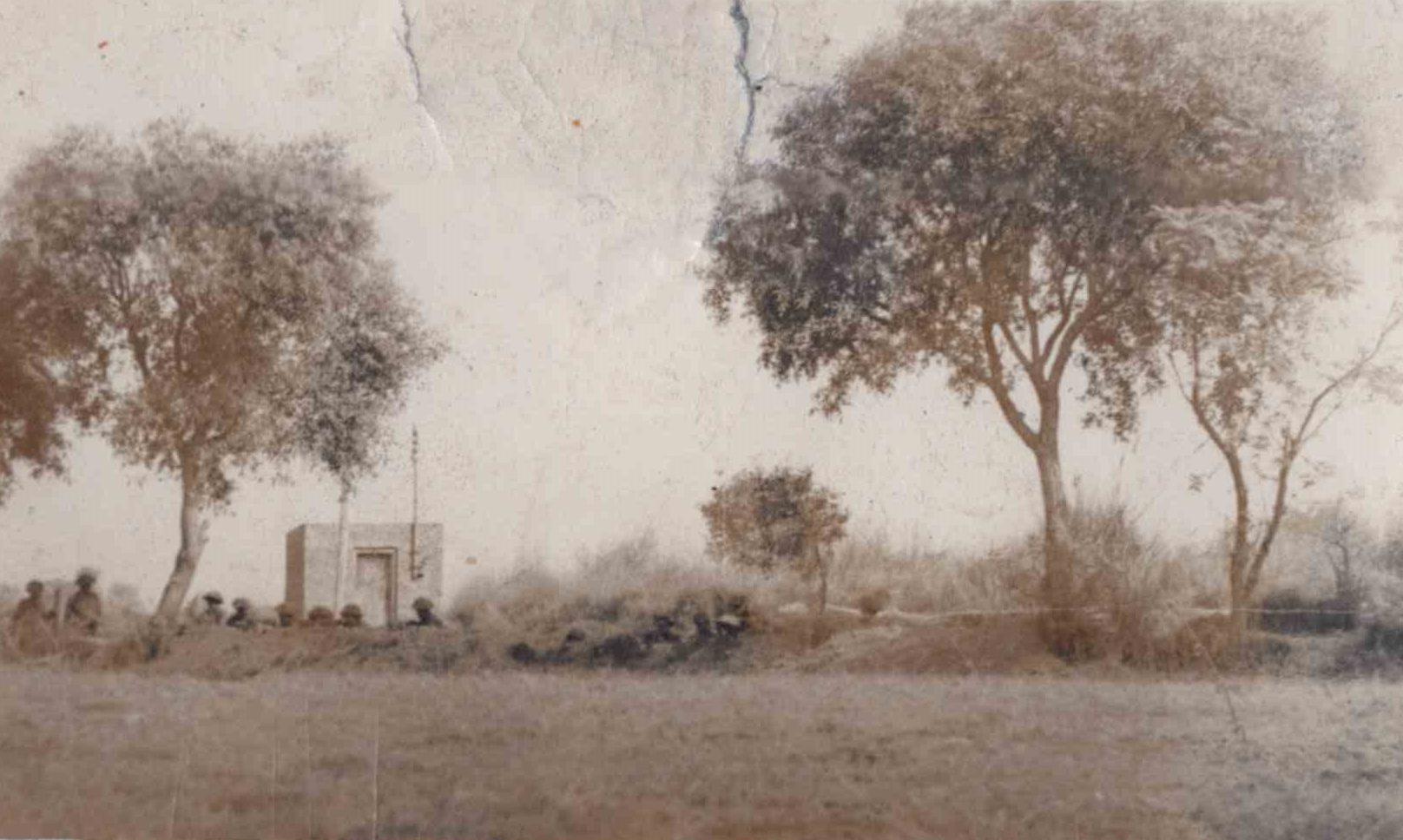
View of the 6 Garhwal Rifles' firm base, just before the final assault on Nawanpind.

The assault started at 1415 hours on December 5 with tanks moving in fire support role from the north and 2Lt Rathore's platoon attacking frontally from the screen position. The enemy was pushed back within the post's perimeter but kept on fighting tenaciously from the bunker and trenches inside the post. The opposition could not be overcome till the CO sent Capt Sinha's platoon to assault from the North-East. Capt Sinha and his platoon not only encircled the post but also led a tank through the minefield to cut off the enemy's route of withdrawal. The tank, led by Dafardar Prithi Singh, was able to swiftly destroy the enemy positions, aiding the advance of Indian forces.

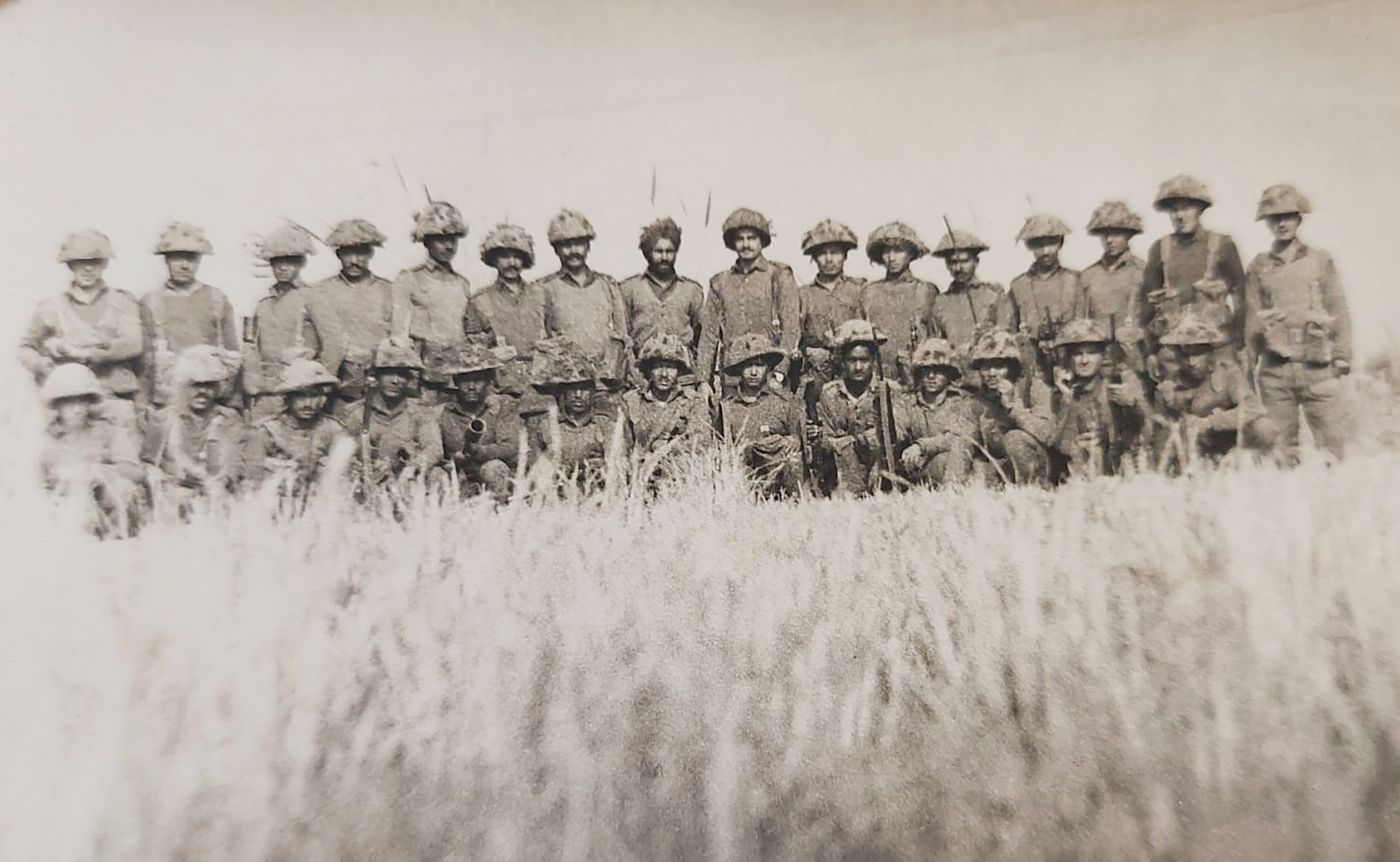
Troops of the 6 Garhwal Rifles after successfully recapturing the Nawanpind post.

Seeing the immediate danger of complete annihilation, the enemy started escaping towards their Thatti post. But only a few could escape. The battle ended after an hour of close quarter battle and brutal hand to hand combat, before Nawanpind Post was successfully recaptured.

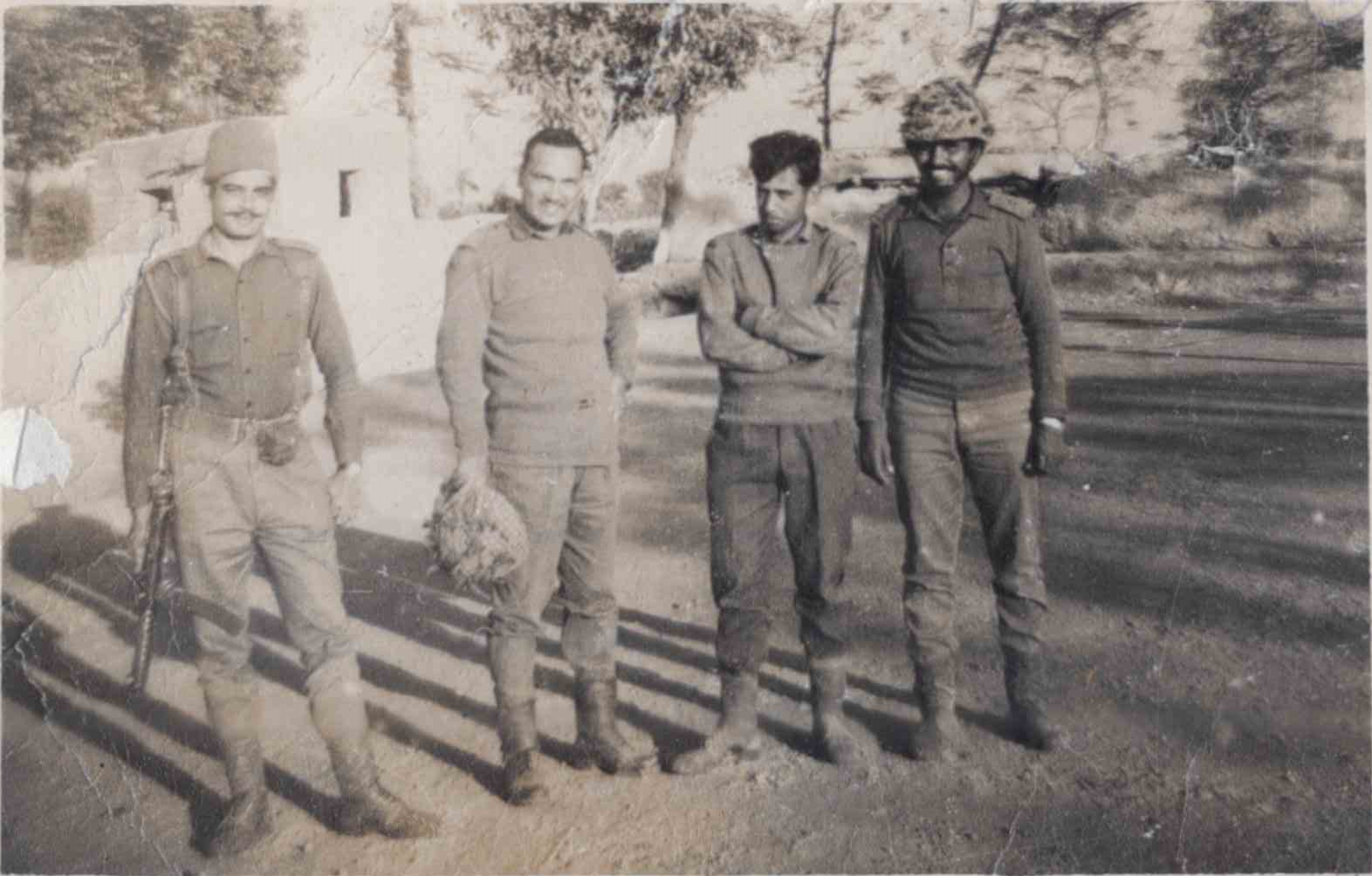
Officers of the 6 Garhwal Rifles at the recaptured Nawanpind post. (From left to right: 2Lt RK Tandon, Maj Satyaveer Thapa, Capt PK Sinha and 2Lt GS Rathore.)

Pakistanis losses in the action were one JCO and 18 other ranks killed. The last rites of whom were done by 6 Garhwal Rifles. Three JCOs, three NCOs and 12 other ranks of Pakistani Army were taken prisoner of war. This included the famous Pakistani sprinter Subedar Abdul Khaliq who was later transferred to the Prisoner of War camp in Udhampur.

After the capture of the post and conclusion of the battle, the two platoons (involved in the battle), remained at the Nawanpind post for the rest of the war to hold it against any retaliation by the enemy. The enemy also lost all their weapons and equipment which included, among other things, four medium machine guns, three sten guns, 30 automatic rifles, two wireless sets, marked maps, signal net diagrams, frequency lists, codes and professional note books.

In this battle, Rifleman Makar Singh Negi, as part of the assaulting platoon charged with his LMG at an enemy MMG post with utter disregard to his personal safety and got wounded in the initial assault. He still managed to kill three enemy soldiers and wounded many before he succumbed to the injuries. He was awarded the Vir Chakra (Posthumously) for bravery of an exceptional order.

== Aftermath ==
After achieving the success at Nawanpind, Lt Col Moorthy planned to conduct his defensive battle by carrying the fight to Pakistani territory. To this end three raids were mounted by officer-led parties between the 10th and 14 December.

The first raid was mounted on the next night on the enemy stronghold of Gujran Thatti. A platoon from 3/3 Gorkha Rifles under Lt Hawa Singh provided support, while Capt Sinha's Commando assaulted the Pakistani positions at Gujran Thatti. encirclement and destruction, the enemy withdrew. The defences and strong points in the village were destroyed. Own troops suffered no casualties.

Another raid, on the night of 13 to 14 December, was mounted on the village Wadi Thatti on the Sialkot Sector. This time too, the troops employed in this raid were a platoon each of Garhwalis and Gorkhas. The raiders managed to get within 10 metres of the target area before being discovered. In the firefight, the raiders threw grenades and fired with automatics while the enemy opened up with MMGs, mortar and field gun. A number of casualties were inflicted on the enemy in close quarter hand to hand fighting.

One Garhwali rifleman was killed in this action, while 2Lt RC Sharma and two other ranks were captured by the enemy, but later escaped and returned to the battalion after two days.

These raids forced Pakistan to vacate a number of its border outposts. Of these, three - Chota Chak, Chombian and Peeli - are still held by India.

== Ceasefire ==
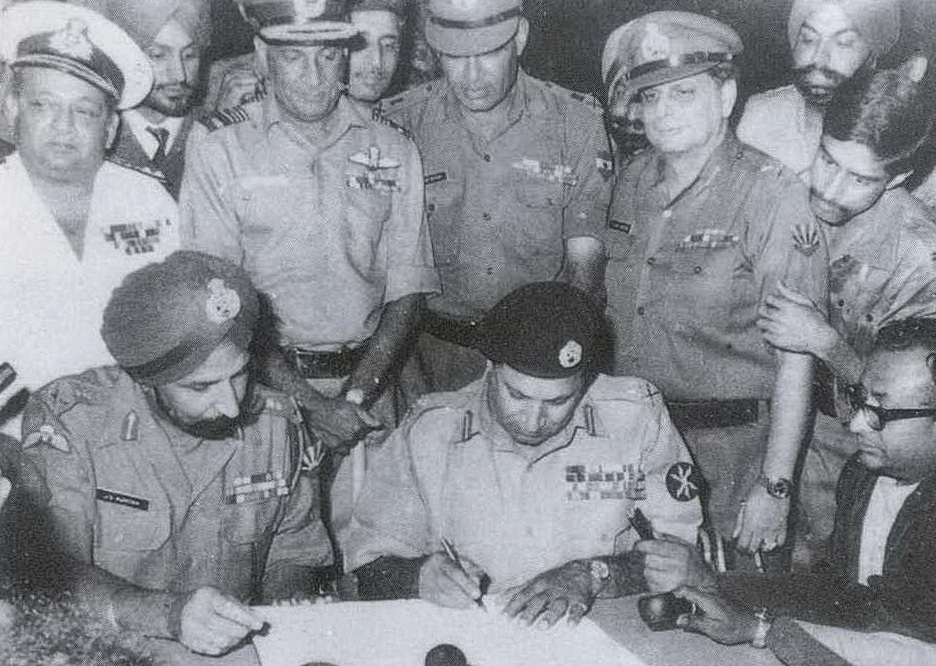
Lt Gen Niazi signing the Instrument of Surrender under the gaze of Lt Gen Aurora.

Further attacks were also planned by Indian forces on the night of December 17/18 on Pakistani positions to ensure reinforcements from Pakistan's 15 Infantry Division are not moved to Shakargarh sector against the impending advance of India's I Corps. But these plans were abandoned after ceasefire in Dhaka.

The war came to an end on 16 December when Lieutenant General AAK Niazi signed the Instrument of Surrender in Dhaka under the supervision of Lieutenant General Jagjit Singh Aurora.

Soon after, a flag staff meeting was held between Major Tejinder Singh of 6 Garhwal Rifles and a Pakistani Army Major to work out the details of cease fire line. Thus, bringing an end to the war in this sector.

This battle not only led to defending and recapturing of Nawanpind and Jogne Chak posts but also in destroying Pakistani border outposts in Thatti, Wadi Thatti and Gujran Thatti.

6 Garhwal Rifles remained in its operational location up till the beginning of May 1972.

== Awards ==
For the battle, Vir Chakras were awarded to 6 Garhwal Rifles' Rifleman Makar Singh Negi and 8th Light Cavalry's Dafadar Prithi Singh for bravery of an exceptional order. Apart from the Veer Chakra, 6 Garhwal Rifles also got two Mentioned-in-Despatches and two COAS Commendation Cards for gallantry actions during the battle.

Awards	Name of Awardee(s)
Vir Chakra	Rifleman Makar Singh Negi; Dafadar Prithi Singh
Mentioned-in-Despatches	Second Lieutenant GS Rathore; Naik Ram Singh Gusian
Parakram Padak	Naib Subedar Kunwar Singh Rauthan; Naik Ram Singh Gusian; Rifleman Govind Singh Rawat; Rifleman Anand Singh Rawat; and others
Chief of Army Staff Commendation	Captain PK Sinha; Subedar Major Udai Singh

=== Rifleman Makar Singh Negi, VrC (P) ===
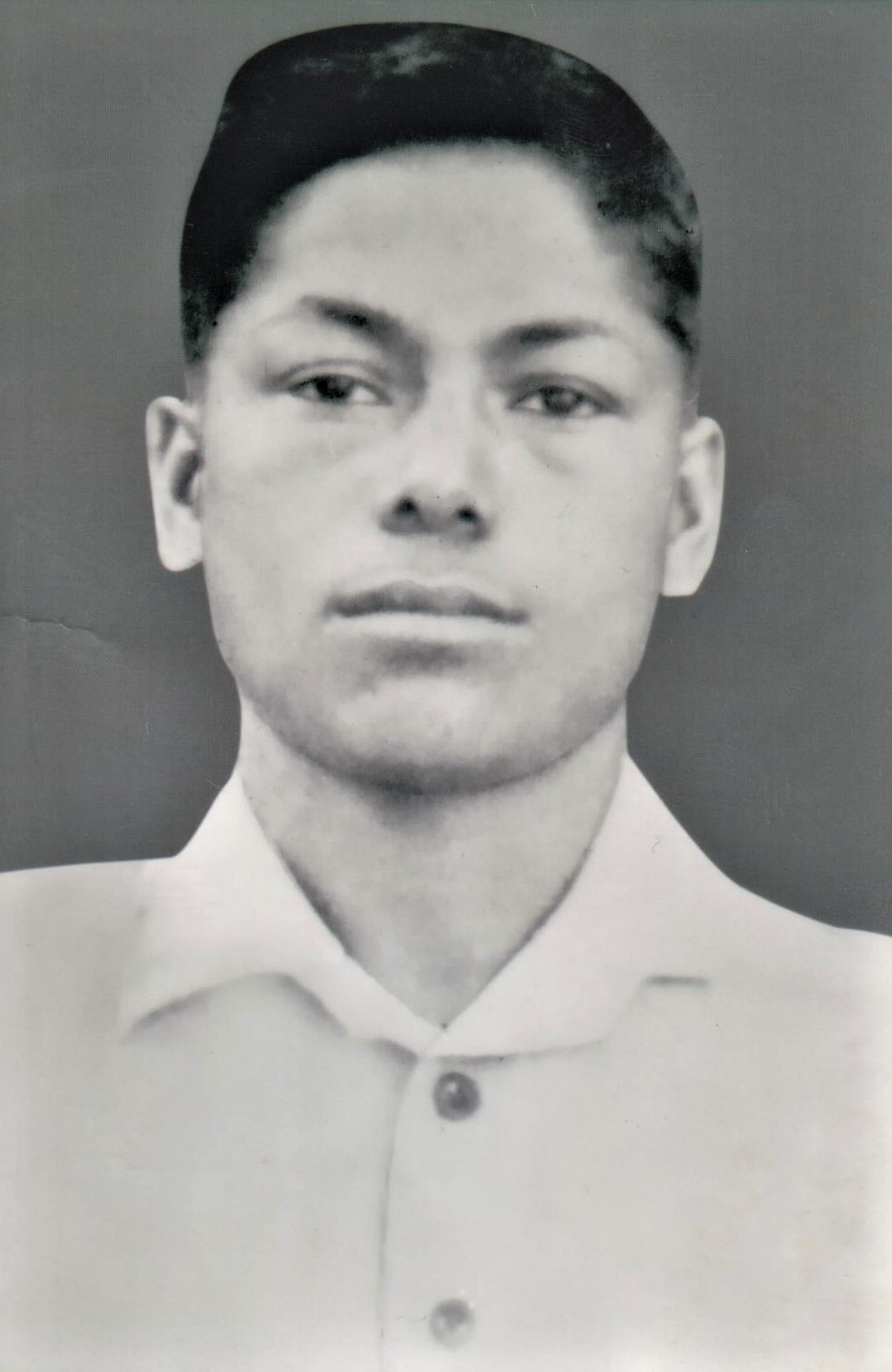
Rifleman Makar Singh Negi, VrC (P) of 6 Garhwal Rifles.

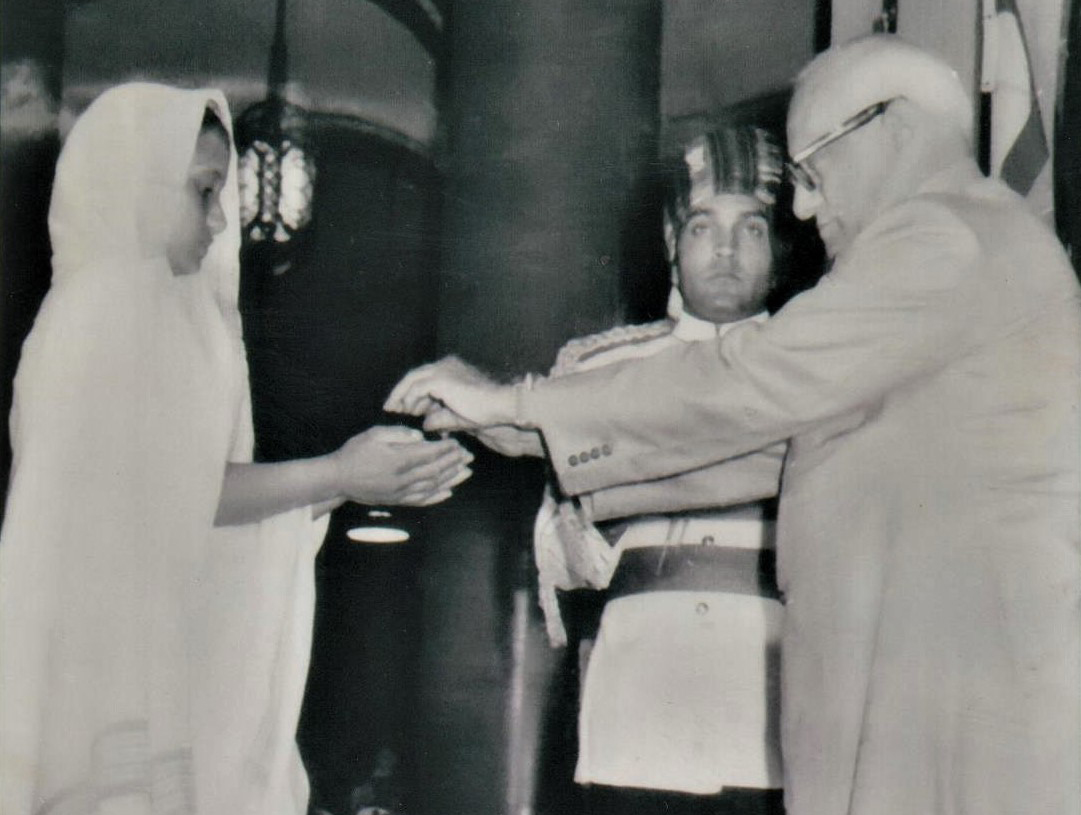
Wife of Rifleman Makar Singh Negi receiving the Vir Chakra award on his behalf by President V. V. Giri.

Negi was a part of the Number 1 Light Machine Gun detachment, as part of the assaulting troops at Nawanpind. On reaching the objective, he dashed and charged with his light machine gun with lightening speed into the enemy medium machine gun post with utter disregard to his personal safety. In doing so, he got wounded by a burst from the enemy medium machine guns. Undaunted by his serious wounds, Negi with his light machine gun succeeded in silencing the enemy medium machine gun, which was accurately showering bullets on Indian assaulting troops. Apart from silencing the medium machine gun post, he inflicted few more casualties on the enemy with his light machine gun until finally collapsing and succumbing to his wounds.

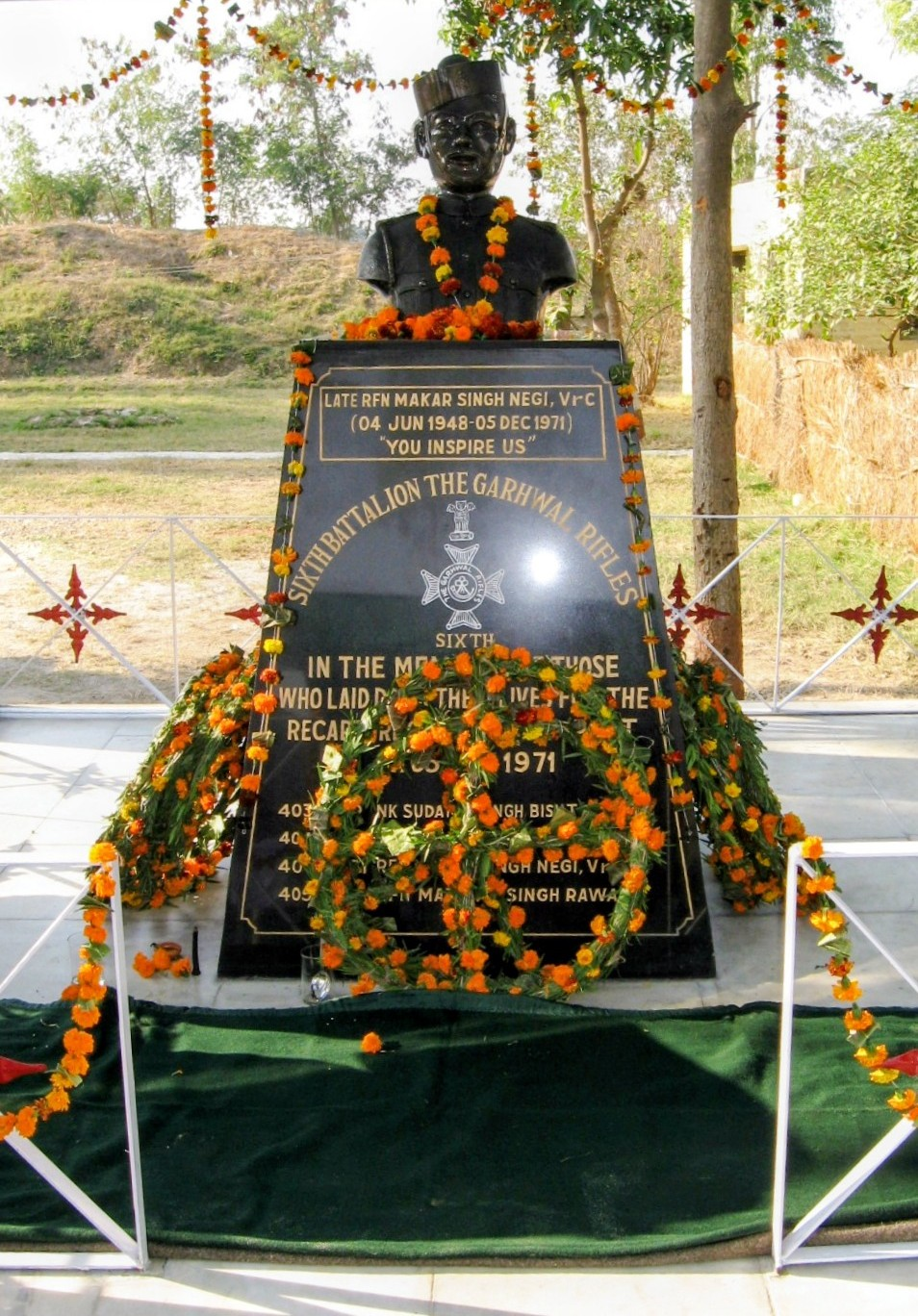
Memorial of Rifleman Makar Singh Negi at Nawanpind, Jammu & Kashmir.

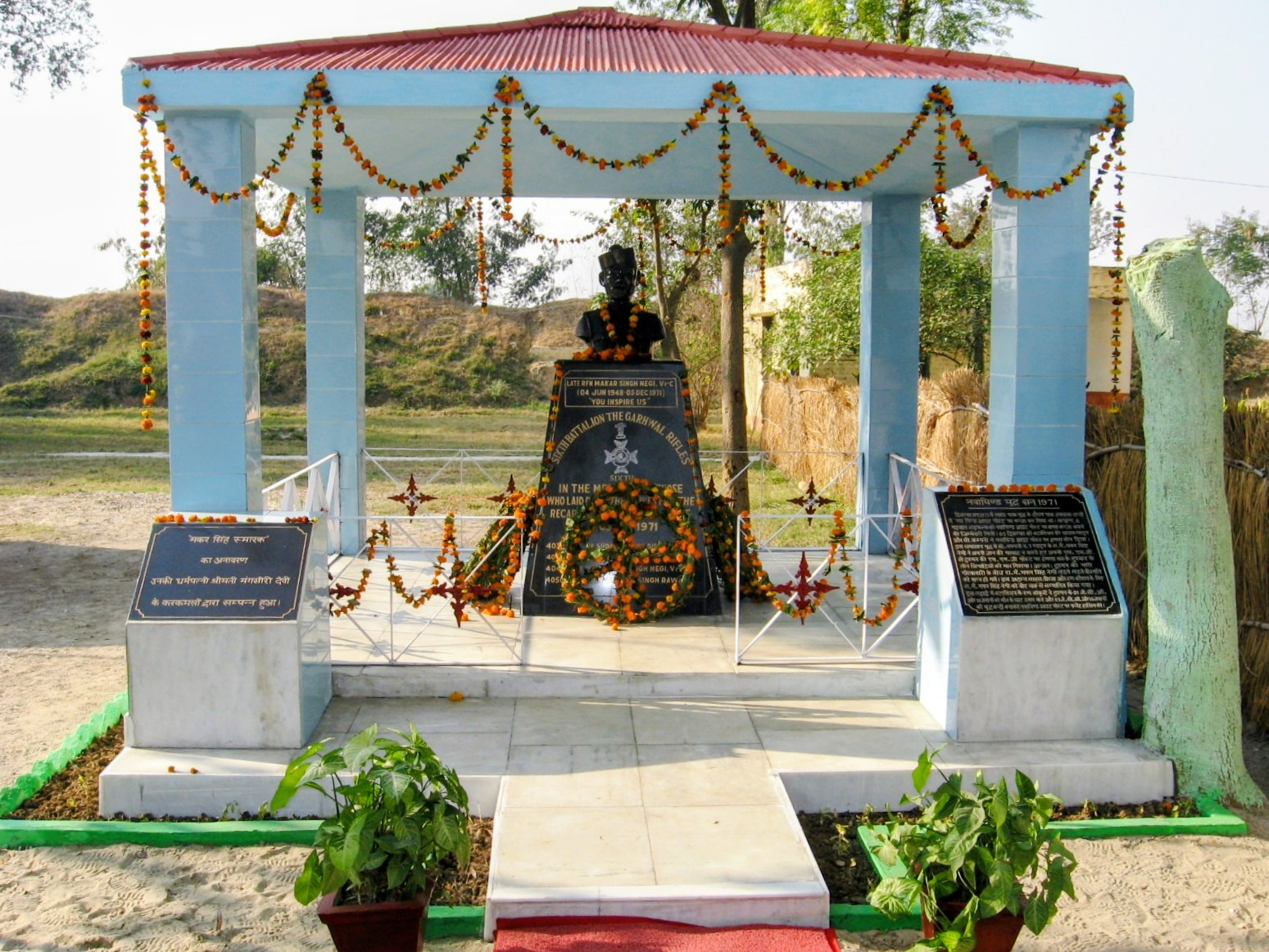
The memorial was constructed by 6 Garhwal Rifles and is maintained by the battalion to date.

This brave action of his enabled the assaulting troops to charge through the objective and finally enabled the successful capture of the objective. Rifleman Makar Singh Negi displayed acts of conspicuous gallantry, boldness and high sense of devotion to duty in the presence of highly determined enemy during the action in the battle of Nawanpind (Sialkot Sector). For this, he was awarded Vir Chakra (Posthumous). His citation for the Vir Chakra was as follows: -

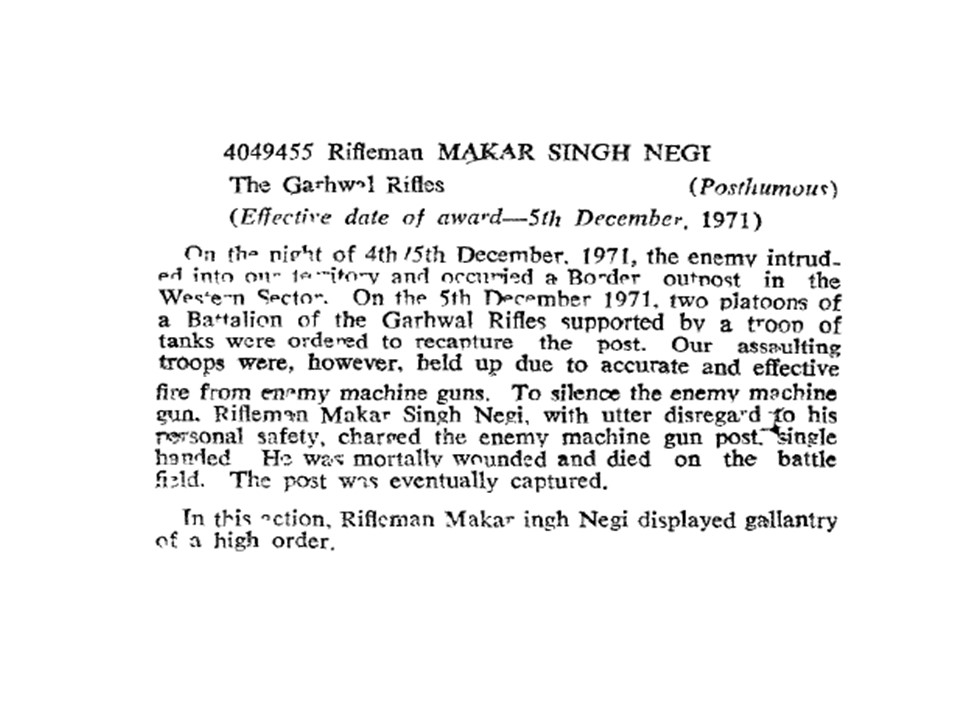
Vir Chakra citation of Rifleman Makar Singh Negi of 6 Garhwal Rifles.

"On the night of 4th/5th December, 1971, the enemy intruded into our territory and occupied a border outpost in the Western Sector. On the 5th December 1971, two platoons of a Battalion of the Garhwal Rifles supported by a troop of tanks were ordered to recapture the post. Our assaulting troops were, however, held up due to accurate and effective fire from enemy machine guns. To silence the enemy machine gun, Rifleman Makar Singh Negi, with utter disregard to his personal safety, charged the enemy machine gun post single handed. He was mortally wounded and died on the battlefield. The post was eventually captured.

In this action, Rifleman Makar Singh Negi displayed gallantry of a high order."

=== Dafadar Prithi Singh, VrC ===
The second Vir Chakra was awarded to Dafadar Prithi Singh of the 8th Light Cavalry. According to his award citation, Singh manoeuvred his tank under heavy shelling and anti-tank fire, closed in with the enemy and destroyed the enemy's stronghold aiding in the recapture of the Nawanpind post.

His citation for the Vir Chakra was as follows: -

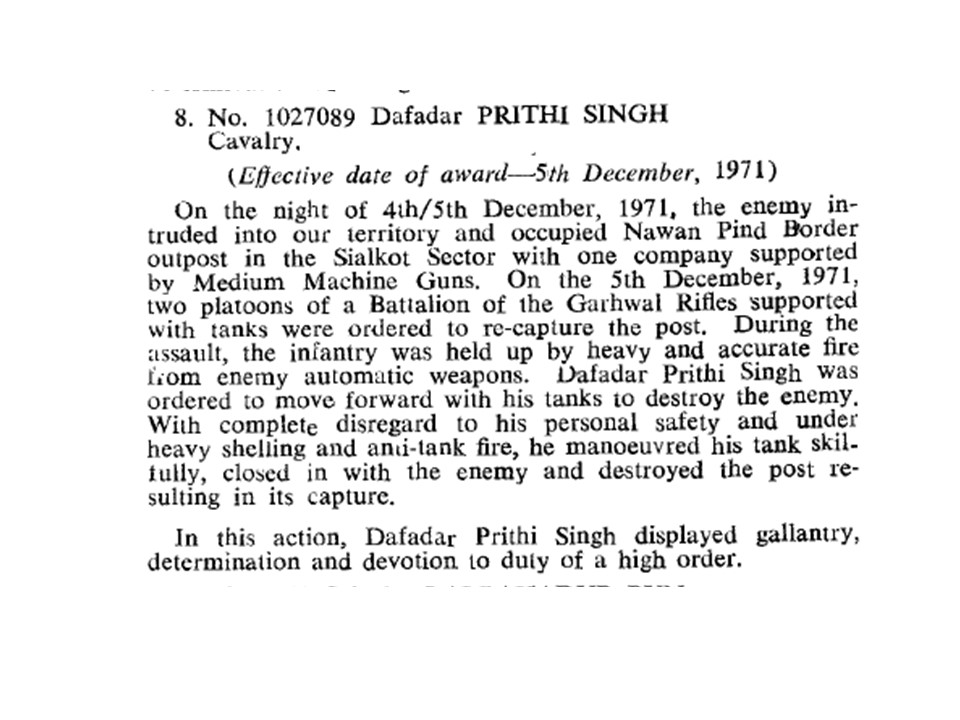
Vir Chakra citation of Dafadar Prithi Singh of 8 Light Cavalry Regiment.

"On the night of 4th/5th December, 1971, the enemy intruded into our territory and occupied Nawan Pind Border outpost in the Sialkot Sector with one company supported by Medium Machine Guns. On the 5th December 1971, two platoons of a Battalion of the Garhwal Rifles supported with tanks were ordered to re-capture the post. During the assault, the was held up by heavy and accurate fire from enemy automatic weapons. Dafadar Prithi Singh was ordered to move forward with his tanks to destroy the enemy. With complete disregard to his personal safety and under heavy shelling and anti-tank fire, he manoeuvred his tank skilfully, closed in with the enemy and destroyed the post resulting in its capture.

In this action, Dafadar Prithi Singh displayed gallantry, determination and devotion of a high order."
