= Khumtai =

Town in Golaghat district, Assam, India

- Town
- Location in Assam, India Khumtai (India)
- Coordinates: 26.5944°N 93.8519°E
- Country: India
- State: Assam
- District: Golaghat

Languages
  - Official: Assamese
- Time zone: UTC+5:30 (IST)
- ISO 3166 code: IN-AS
- Vehicle registration: AS-05

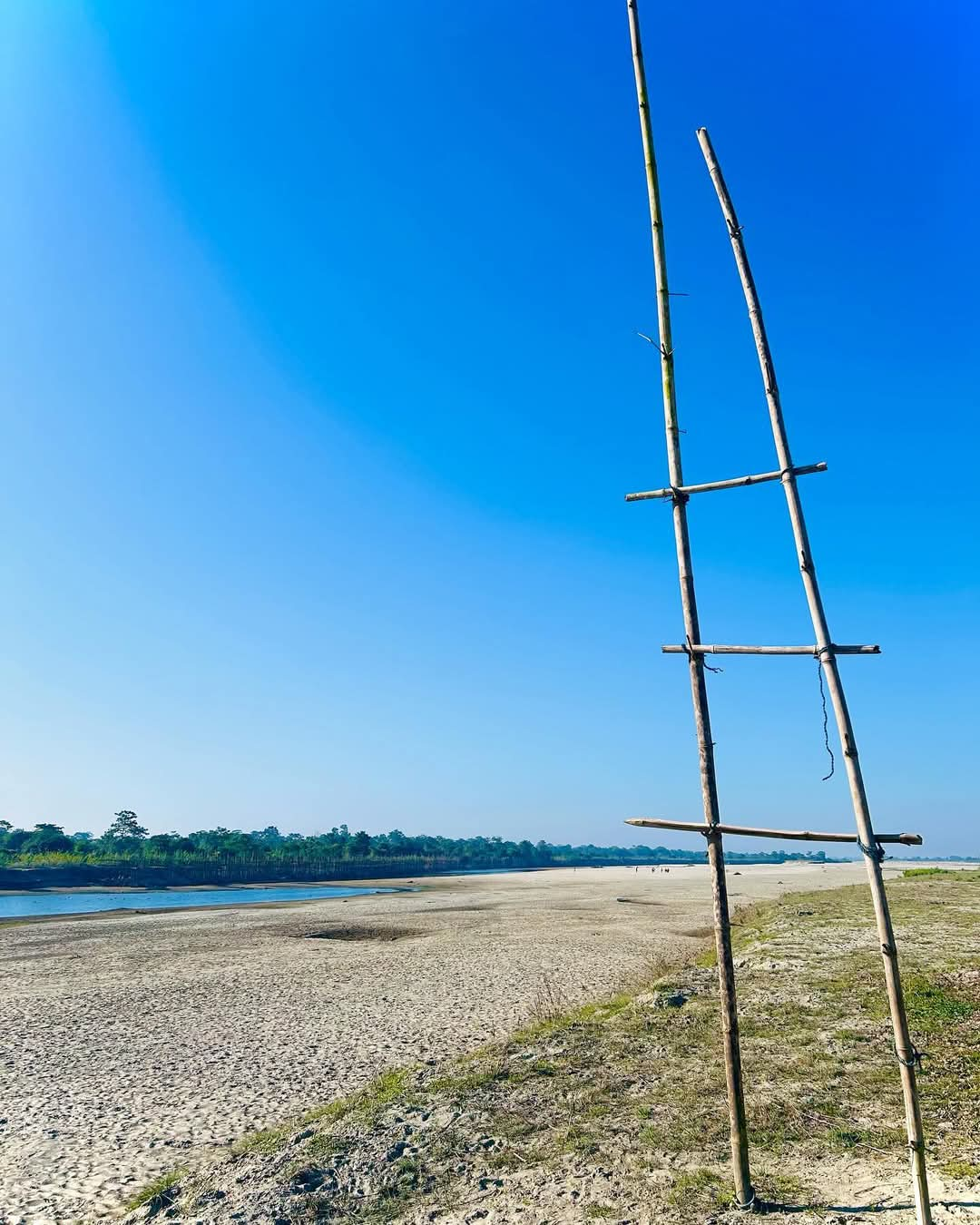
View of Alami Chapori area in Khumtai

Khumtai is a town in Golaghat district of the Indian state of Assam. It is an administrative and electoral constituency in the district.

== Connectivity ==
Khumtai is located in Upper Assam and is connected by road to nearby towns and cities. It lies approximately 35–43 km from Jorhat. The town has its own railway station, Khumtai Railway Station, while the nearest major junction is Furkating. The nearest airport is Jorhat Airport.

== Kumtai as Co-District ==
On 15 August 2026, Assam Chief Minister Himanta Biswa Sarma announced the creation of Khumtai as one of eight new Co-Districts (Assamese: Xama-Zilla) in the state. The Assam Cabinet formally approved the operationalisation of these Co-Districts on 18 August 2026.The headquarters of the Khumtai Co-District is proposed to be located at the Khumtai Revenue Circle office area (near Khumtai Chariali).

== Demographics ==
As per the 2011 Census of India, the village of Khumtai had a population of 1,350, with 703 males and 647 females. There were 296 households. Children aged 0–6 years numbered 153, forming 11.33% of the population. The sex ratio was 920 females per 1,000 males. Scheduled Castes made up 10.96% and Scheduled Tribes 0.22% of the population. Out of the total population, 401 people were engaged in work, of whom 90.77% were main workers.
