= Garhwal Rifles =

Regiment of the Indian Army

- Regimental Insignia of the Garhwal Rifles
- Active: 1887–present
- Country: India
- Branch: Indian Army
- Type: Infantry
- Size: 28 battalions
- Regimental Centre: Lansdowne, Pauri Garhwal, Uttarakhand
- Nickname: Snow Leopards The Royal Garhwalis The Veer Garhwalis Gallant Bhullas
- Motto: Yudhaya Krit Nishchaya (Fight with Determination)
- War Cry: Badri Vishal Lal Ki Jai (Victory to the Sons of Lord Badrinath)
- March: Badhe Chalo Garhwaliyon
- Anniversaries: 5 May 1887
- Decorations: 3 Victoria Crosses; 1 Ashoka Chakra; 7 Param Vishisht Seva Medals; 1 Uttam Yudh Seva Medal; 25 Ati Vishisht Seva Medals (including 1 Bar); 4 Maha Vir Chakras; 10 Kirti Chakras; 43 Vir Chakras; 49 Shaurya Chakras; 13 Yudh Seva Medals; 284 Sena Medals (including 2 Bars); 30 Vishisht Seva Medals (including 6 Bars); 1 Jeevan Raksha Padak
- Battle honours: Post-Independence Tithwal, Jammu and Kashmir, Nuranang, Buttur Dograndi, Punjab, Gadra Road, Rajasthan, Hilli, East Pakistan, Operation Pawan, Batalik, Dras, Kargil

Commanders
- Colonel of the Regiment: Lieutenant General Dinesh Singh Rana

Insignia
- Insignia: A Maltese cross with Lion Capital of Ashoka

The Garhwal Rifles are an infantry regiment of the Indian Army. It was originally raised in 1887 as the 39th (Garhwal) Regiment of the Bengal Army. It then became part of the British Indian Army as the 18th Royal Garhwal Rifles, and after the Independence of India, it was incorporated into the Indian Army and is one of its most decorated regiments.

It served during the frontier campaigns of the late 19th and early 20th centuries, as well in both World Wars and the wars fought after independence. It is mainly made up of Garhwali people from seven districts of Uttarakhand's Garhwal division: Uttarkashi, Chamoli, Rudraprayag, Tehri Garhwal, Dehradun, Pauri Garhwal and Haridwar.

Today it has well over 26,000 soldiers, organized into twenty one regular battalions (2nd to 22nd), two battalions of the Territorial Army (121 Inf Bn TA and 127 Inf Bn TA (Eco)) and three Rashtriya Rifles Battalions (14 RR, 36 RR, 48 RR). The 1st Battalion has since been converted to mechanized infantry and forms part of the Mechanised Infantry Regiment as its 6th battalion. The regiment has a specialized scout battalion of Garhwal Scouts also known as "The Snow Leopards", it is an elite infantry battalion specializing in long range reconnaissance and extreme high-altitude warfare. Garhwal Scouts are stationed permanently at Joshimath. Garhwal Scouts is the main battalion of the Ibex brigade (9th Independent Mountain Brigade). The battalion is distinguished from other battalions with scouts patches on sholders and scout badge on chest.

The regimental insignia incorporates a Maltese cross and is based on the defunct Rifle Brigade (Prince Consort's Own) as they are a designated rifle regiment. Unlike regular rifle regiments, they are one of ten such units marching in the regular paces used in the Indian Army's ceremonies.

== Early history ==
Up to 1887, Garhwális had been enlisted in the five regiments of Gurkhas belonging to the Bengal Infantry and the Punjab Frontier Force. The Sirmoor Battalion (later the 2nd Gurkhas), which fought in the siege of Delhi in 1857, had 33% Garhwális on their rolls at that time.

The first proposal to raise a separate Regiment of the Garhwális was initiated by His Excellency Lieutenant General, (Later Field Marshal) Sir F. S. Roberts, VC, then Commander-in-Chief, India, in January 1886. Accordingly, in April 1887, the raising of the Second Battalion of the Third (The Kumaon) Gurkha Regiment was ordered, with its class composition as six mixed companies of Garhwali and Kumaoni men and two of Gurkhas. Based on this decision, recruiting commenced in the area of upper Garhwál and Tehri state by Major L Campbell and Captain Browne. The battalion was raised by Lieutenant Colonel E P Mainwaring of the 4th Gurkhas. Major LRD Campbell was the second in Command and Lt Col JHT Evatt, the Adjutant, both from the Punjab Frontier Force. Lt Col EP Mainwaring raised the First Battalion at Almora on 5 May 1887 and moved it to Kaludanda, which was later renamed as Lansdowne after the then Viceroy of India, on 4 November 1887.

In 1891, the two Gurkha companies moved away to form the nucleus of 2nd Battalion, 3rd Gurkha Rifles and the remaining Battalion was re-designated as 39th (Garhwáli) Regiment of the Bengal Infantry. The ‘Crossed Khukris’ of the Gurkhas were replaced by the ‘Phoenix’, the mythical bird which rises out of its own ashes, in the crest, marking the formal beginnings of the Garhwális as a distinct class Regiment. The official title of ‘Rifles’ was received in 1892. The ‘Phoenix’ was later dropped, and the Maltese Cross which was in use by the Rifle Brigade (Prince Consort's Own) was adopted.

The Regimental Centre was established at Lansdowne on 1 October 1921.

The Indomitable Garhwali Soldier: War Memorial, Lansdowne

== First World War (1914–18) ==
The Great War saw the Garhwali's in France, part of the Garhwal Brigade of the Meerut Division, plunging into action in Flanders, where both battalions fought. The regiment had the distinction of winning two Victoria Crosses; Nk Darwan Singh Negi at Festubert and Rfn Gabar Singh Negi (posthumous) at Neuve Chapelle. Nk Darwan Singh also had the distinction of being the first Indian to be presented the Victoria Cross personally by the King Emperor who made a special trip to the battle front in France at Locon on 1 December 1914. The extent of casualties being very high, the battalions were temporarily amalgamated and designated "The Garhwal Rifles" (the two Garhwali battalions lost 14 officers, 15 VCOs and 405 killed in France). Lt Gen Sir James Willcocks, commanding the Indian Corps in France had this to say about the Garhwali's in his book "With the Indians in France" : "The 1st and 2nd Battalions both did splendidly on every occasion in which they were engaged... the Garhwali's suddenly sprang to the very front rank of our best fighting men... nothing could have been better than their elan and discipline".

Later, in 1917, the re-constituted 1st and 2nd Battalions saw action against the Turks in Mesopotamia. At Khan Baghdadi on 25-26 Mar 1918, 2nd Battalion under the command of Lt Col Hogg, distinguished itself encircled and forced a Turkish column to surrender (consisting of 300 all ranks, complete with its Divisional Commander and staff). The 1st Battalion, under the command of Lt Col Numb, MC distinguished itself in actions against the Turks at Sharqat on 29–30 October 1918. The battalion received gallantry awards. As due recognition of their fighting prowess in the Great War, Battle Honours "La Bassee", "Armentieres", "Festubert", "Neuve Chapelle", "Aubers", "France and Flanders 1914-15", "Egypt", "Macedonia", "Khan Baghdadi", "Sharqat", "Mesopotamia" and "Afghanistan" were conferred on the Regiment. The 3rd Battalion was raised in 1916 and the 4th in 1918; these two battalions saw action in Afghanistan and the North-West Frontier. (In between, in 1917 a 4th Battalion had been raised through drafts from the existing three Garhwali battalions, consisting of men mostly from Kumaon; its designation was changed to 4th Battalion 39th Kumaon Rifles, and then in 1918 to 1st Battalion 50th Kumaon Rifles).

In Oct 1919, the 4th Battalion was dispatched to Kohat for action against the Waziris and Mashuds. After successful completion of operations in Kohat, the Battalion was tasked to occupy, a very important, yet difficult piquet on the Spin Ghara Ridge near Kotkai. In the consequent onslaught by Mashuds on 2 January 1920, the Company Commander, Lt WD Kenny held his piquet under heavy fire and waves of fanatic tribals. The company suffered significant casualties as a result. When the piquet was finally ordered to withdraw, the party was continuously ambushed, resulting in further casualties. Lt Kenny, though badly wounded, helped in evacuation of his men while giving battle to the tribal forces until he eventually collapsed and succumbed. For his conspicuous bravery against overwhelming numbers of Mahsuds, Lt WD Kenny was posthumously awarded the third Victoria Cross. The famous Spin Ghara Ridge was renamed and was subsequently remembered as ‘The Garhwali Ridge’.

== Reorganization and Title of Royal ==
On 1 October 1921, as part of the reorganization of the Indian Army, the ‘Group’ system was introduced into the Indian Army and the Regiment became the 18th Indian Infantry Group. On the same day, the Fourth Battalion under Lieutenant Colonel Kenneth Henderson, DSO, was nominated as the Training Battalion of the Group. On 1 December the same year it was renamed as the 10/18th Royal Garhwal Rifles. Even today, veterans colloquially refer to the Regiment as Garhwal Group.

On 2 February 1921, on the historic occasion of laying of the foundation stone of the All India War Memorial at Delhi (now called 'India Gate'), the Duke of Connaught announced that in recognition of the distinguished services and gallantry, the Emperor had conferred the title of Royal to six units and two Regiments, of which the Regiment was one. The ‘Royal’ Garhwal Rifles was sanctioned the special distinguishing mark of wearing a scarlet twisted red cord(royal rassi) on the right shoulder and the Tudor crown on its shoulder title. The title ‘Royal’ had been dropped after the independence, but the scarlet twisted red cord (royal rassi) remains.

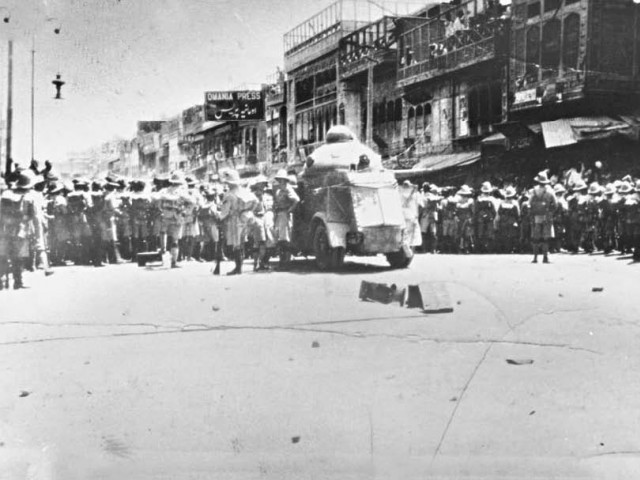
Garwal Rifles refused orders in Qissa Khwani Bazaar massacre.

== Second World War (1939–45) ==
The outbreak of World War II led to an expansion of the regiment, with the 4th Battalion being re-raised in 1940 and the 5th being raised in 1941. An 11th (Territorial) Battalion had been raised in Peshawar in 1939 for line of communication protection duties; the 6th Battalion was raised from this in 1941.

World War II saw active participation of the Garhwalis, the 1st and 4th Battalions in Burma, the 2nd and 5th Battalions seeing action in Malaya. The 2nd Battalion was the Garrison Battalion at Kuantan in the Malay Peninsula in 1940. The only infantry battalion in Kuantan, it was put to a myriad of tasks in a widely dispersed area. Just before the Japanese offensive, it had been milked twice to assist forming new battalions. When the Japanese struck, the battalion fought gallantly, inflicting heavy casualties. The battalion was awarded Battle Honour ‘Kuantan’ and Theatre Honour ‘Malaya 1941-42’. The 2nd Battalion ceased to exist after the Malayan Campaign due to heavy casualties – the remnants captured by the Japanese. The newly raised 5th Battalion was ordered overseas in Dec 1941 while still raw and under-equipped. It sailed for the Middle East, however the destination was changed after it embarked to Singapore. The battalion fought some notable actions at Muar, Johor and then the long, bitter rearguard action to Singapore. The 7th Battalion was raised essentially as a replacement for these two battalions (later converted to a training role). It was only after the War in 1946 that the 2nd Battalion was re-raised. The 5th had to wait until 1962 for its re-raising.

The 1st Battalion moved to Burma in 1941 and fought valiantly in the effort to stem the Japanese tide. It took part in the desperate fighting in the southern Shan states at Yenangyuang, which it was awarded as a Battle Honour. It also has the distinction of being the only awardee of Battle Honour "Monywa," the last major action in the Retreat from Burma. After a period of rest and regrouping followed by intensive jungle training, the battalion was back for the Reconquest of Burma. Its actions in Arakan, Ngyakydauk Pass, the landings at Ramree, and the final entry into Rangoon won it more Battle Honours: "North Arakan," "Ngakyduak Pass," "Ramree" and "Tuangup," and Theatre Honour "Burma 1942-45."

The 4th Battalion, too, was ordered to Burma after nearly three years on the NW Frontier. After intensive jungle warfare training, it moved to Burma and fought a series of actions in the Tunnels Area, Akyab and subsequent operations at Ruywa before proceeding to Kuala Lumpur for disarming the Japanese who had capitulated.

In North Africa and Italy, the 3rd Battalion served in Abyssinia, the Western Desert, Egypt, Cyprus, Iraq, Syria, Palestine and finally in the Campaign in Italy. In Abyssinia, in the opening stages of WWII, it blazed a trail against the Italians. Among its Battle Honours earned are three ‘Garhwali-only’ honours: "Gallabat," "Barentu" and "Massawa." More Battle Honours followed: "Keren," "Amba Alagi," "Citta di Castello" and Theatre Honours "North Africa 1940-43" and "Italy 1943-45," bearing testimony to Garhwali valour in diverse battlefields and theatres.

The end of the War and consequent demobilization left the regiment with three regular battalions, the 1st, 2nd and 3rd. Thus, at Independence, the Garhwal Rifles had only three active battalions.

== Post-Independence ==
After the formation of India in 1947 and the subsequent merger of the various states in India at the time, the Garhwal Princely State was among the first to be merged into the Indian Union. Subsequently, the Regiment was transferred to the newly independent Indian Army. The 3rd Battalion participated with distinction in the J&K Operations, winning Battle Honour "Tithwal" and gaining the distinction of becoming one of the most decorated battalions of the Indian Army in any one operation after independence – it won one MVC, 18 VrCs, 01 SC (then referred to as the Ashoka Chakra Class III) and 19 Mentions-in-Despatches. The Commanding Officer Lt Col Kaman Singh was awarded a well deserved Maha Vir Chakra and his name lives on in the form of the ‘Kaman Setu’, the crossing point recently opened up between Azad Kashmir and J&K (now renamed the ‘Aman Kaman Setu’).

In 1950, the Royal title was dropped from the Regiment's name when India became a Republic. Other regimental symbols that were associated with the British were also discontinued, although the regimental lanyard continued to be worn on the right shoulder in traditional 'Royal' fashion. In 1953, the Regiment's 3rd Battalion contributed to the United Nations custodian force in Korea.

== Sino-Indian War of 1962 ==
The 1962 Sino-Indian Conflict saw the 4th Battalion (at that time the youngest battalion of the regiment) in the midst of heavy fighting in Tawang, Jang and Nuranang areas of NEFA, where it gave an excellent account of itself, suffering very heavy casualties. The battalion's stand at Nuranang has been singled out in most accounts of the war as a "fine example of infantry battle". For its brave stand against overwhelming odds, 4 GARH RIF was awarded the Battle Honour "Nuranang" – the only battalion to be awarded a battle honour in NEFA, a singular distinction in the context of that particular conflict. Nuranang has since been renamed Jaswantgarh, in honour of Rfn Jaswant Singh Rawat whose bravery at Nuranang merited a posthumous Maha Vir Chakra. The other Maha Vir Chakra won in this conflict was won by Lt Col (later Maj Gen) BM Bhattacharjea, the indefatigable Commanding Officer under whose leadership the 4th Battalion gave a bloody nose to the Chinese. In captivity, the survivors of the battalion were singled out for extra punishment in the Chinese PoW camp as retaliation for the heavy casualties the Chinese had suffered at the hands of the Garhwalis. The Battalion's legendary action at Nuranang has passed in folk lore. Gallantry Awards received by the battalion were two Mahavir Chakra, seven Vir Chakra, one Sena Medal and one Mention-in-Despatches.

== Indo-Pakistan War of 1965 ==
In 1965, the First Battalion fought splendid actions in the Barmer sector of Rajasthan for which it was subsequently awarded Battle Honour "Gadra Road", the Second Battalion at OP Hill, the Sixth Battalion at Phillora and the Eighth Battalion at Butur Dograndi, where it lost two senior Officers viz Lt Col JE Jhirad and Major AR Khan within two days. The command then fell on to youngest captain (Lt Col) HS Rautela who led from the front and got a gallantry commendation from the then Chief of Army Staff. Captain CN Singh of the Regiment was posthumously awarded the MVC for gallantry whilst serving in HQ 120 Infantry Brigade. First Battalion and Eighth Battalion were honoured with battle honours 'GADRA ROAD’ and ‘BUTUR DOGRANDI’ respectively. The Sixth Battalion and Eighth Battalion was also awarded the Theatre Honour 'Punjab 1965'.

During the Battle of Gadra City, the 1st Battalion was in the Rajasthan sector and distinguished itself in operations to take Gadra City, giving a fine display of infantry tactics in desert terrain without artillery support. The battalion went on to capture Jesse ke Par, Nawa Tala and Miajlar. Among those awarded the Vir Chakra was the CO Lt Col KP Lahiri. The Battalion won Battle Honour ‘Gadra Road’ and Theatre Honour ‘Rajasthan 1965’. Captain Narsingh bahadur Singh played an important role and for his gallantry and courageous efforts he was awarded with 'sena medal' Gallantry Awards received by the battalion were tharee Vir Chakra and five Mention-in-Despatches .

During Operation Hill, the 2nd Battalion participated in the two assaults on ‘OP Hill’. Capt Chandra Narain Singh of the 2nd Battalion was attached to HQ 120 Infantry Brigade. In a gallant night action against raiders in the Galuthi area, he led the charge that killed six of the enemy while the rest fled, leaving behind large quantities of arms, ammunition and equipment. Capt CN Singh was hit by a machine gun burst in this action and laid down his life. He was awarded the Maha Vir Chakra posthumously.

The 3rd Battalion was in the Lahore sector, and participated in the advance up the GT Road. It suffered 33 killed, mostly due to very heavy enemy artillery fire. The 6th Battalion was in Sialkot where some of the fiercest fighting of the war took place. In the initial phase, the battalion took Charwa. It then held on doggedly to Phillaura, beating back several enemy attacks. The 8th Battalion was also in the Sialkot sector, and fought the bitterly contested battle of Buttur Dograndi, paying a heavy price including losing the Commanding Officer and the 2IC within a span of two days of heavy fighting. These actions brought more glory to the regiment by way of Battle Honour "Buttur Dograndi" and the Theatre Honour "Punjab 1965". Gallantry Awards received by the battalion were one Vir Chakra, one Sena Medal and six Mention-in-Despatches.

== Indo-Pakistani War of 1971 ==
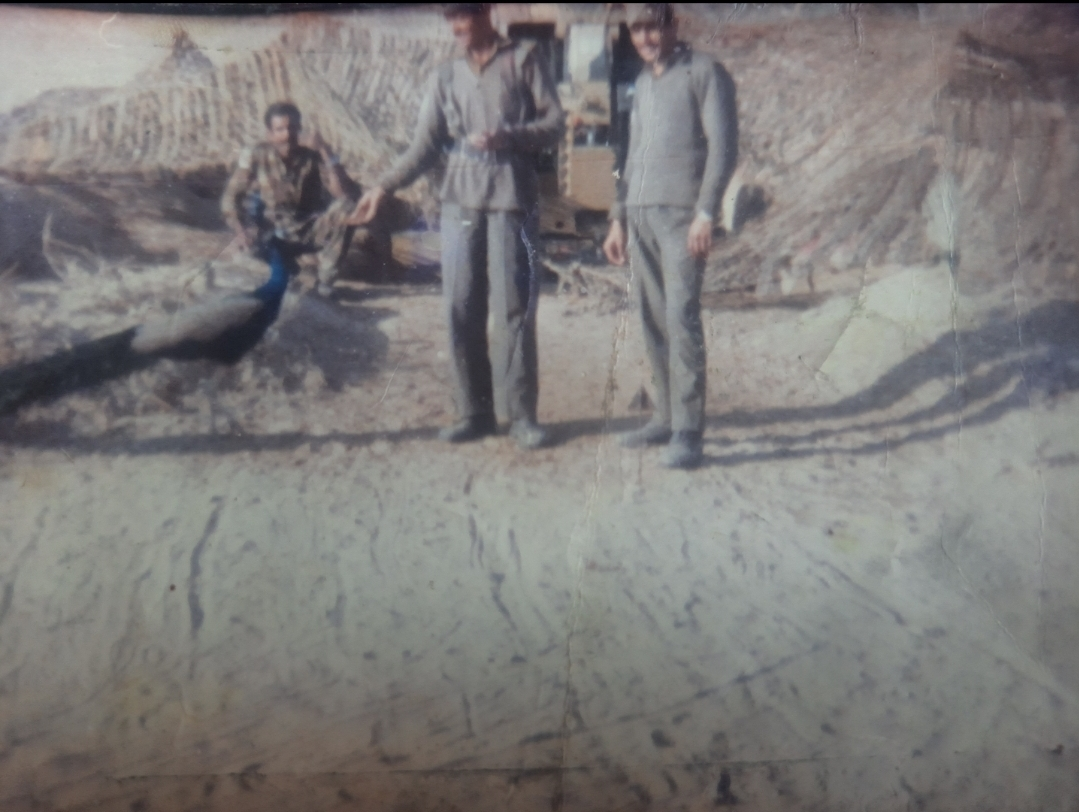
Soldiers feeding a peacock on the western front of the Indo-Pakistani War of 1971

The 5th Battalion blazed a glorious trail during operations for the Liberation of Bangladesh. For its actions in the war, the battalion was awarded Battle Honour ‘Hilli’ and Theatre Honour ‘East Pakistan (1971)’. The battalion won three Vir Chakras, three Sena Medals and seven Mention-in-Despatches. The 12th Battalion had been in action since October 1971 and on commencement of active hostilities, took Hatibandha and participated in operations east of Dinajpur.

The 3rd Battalion was in the Shakargarh sector. It took its initial objectives Dhandar and Mukhwal (south of Suchetgarh) and then into enemy territory to Bairi and Laisar Kalan. By the time of the ceasefire, the battalion had penetrated up to Ramri, north of Chakra. Gallantry Awards received by the battalion were one Vir Chakra and one Sena Medal. The 4th Battalion was in the Jhangar sector and conducted raids on enemy outposts while holding its own ground. The 6th Battalion was in the Sialkot sector. After re-taking Nawanpind, the battalion carried the defensive battle into enemy territory, mounting three strong raids on enemy posts opposite its area. Gallantry Awards received by the battalion were one Vir Chakra and two Mention-in-Despatches. The 7th Battalion was in the Chhamb sector, fighting a series of actions culminating in the re-capture of Sangam post by the time the ceasefire was declared.

The 8th Battalion under the command of Maj H.S Rautela S.M.(now Lt Col) was also in a holding role in Punjab and captured enemy post Ghurki and was awarded the Sena Medal. They kept holding this post despite shelling that continued until the ceasefire. Gallantry Awards received by the battalion were two Sena Medals.

The 10th Battalion fought a notable action led by Maj Mahabir Negi while capturing Raipur Crossing in the Akhnur-Jaurian sector. The Commanding Officer Lt Col Onkar Singh personally led one of the attacks, being critically wounded and later succumbing to his injuries.

== Operation Pawan by Shanti Sena (1987–88) ==
In This Operation Some Battalions of Garhwal Rifle Send by Present Prime Minister Shri Rajiv Gandhi in 1987. During Operation Pawan by Shanti Sena of India, The 5th Battalion and 11th Battalion was on a task of removing LTTE (Liberation Tigers of Tamil Eelam) Command in the Local sector of Sri Lanka. On this Task Rifleman Kuldeep Singh Bhandari of 5th Battalion Shifted to 11th Battalion for Rescue of battalion member who injured in LTTE Attack. He Save life of Other members of 11th Battalion & displayed indomitable courage & was awarded by Vir Chakra.

== Units ==
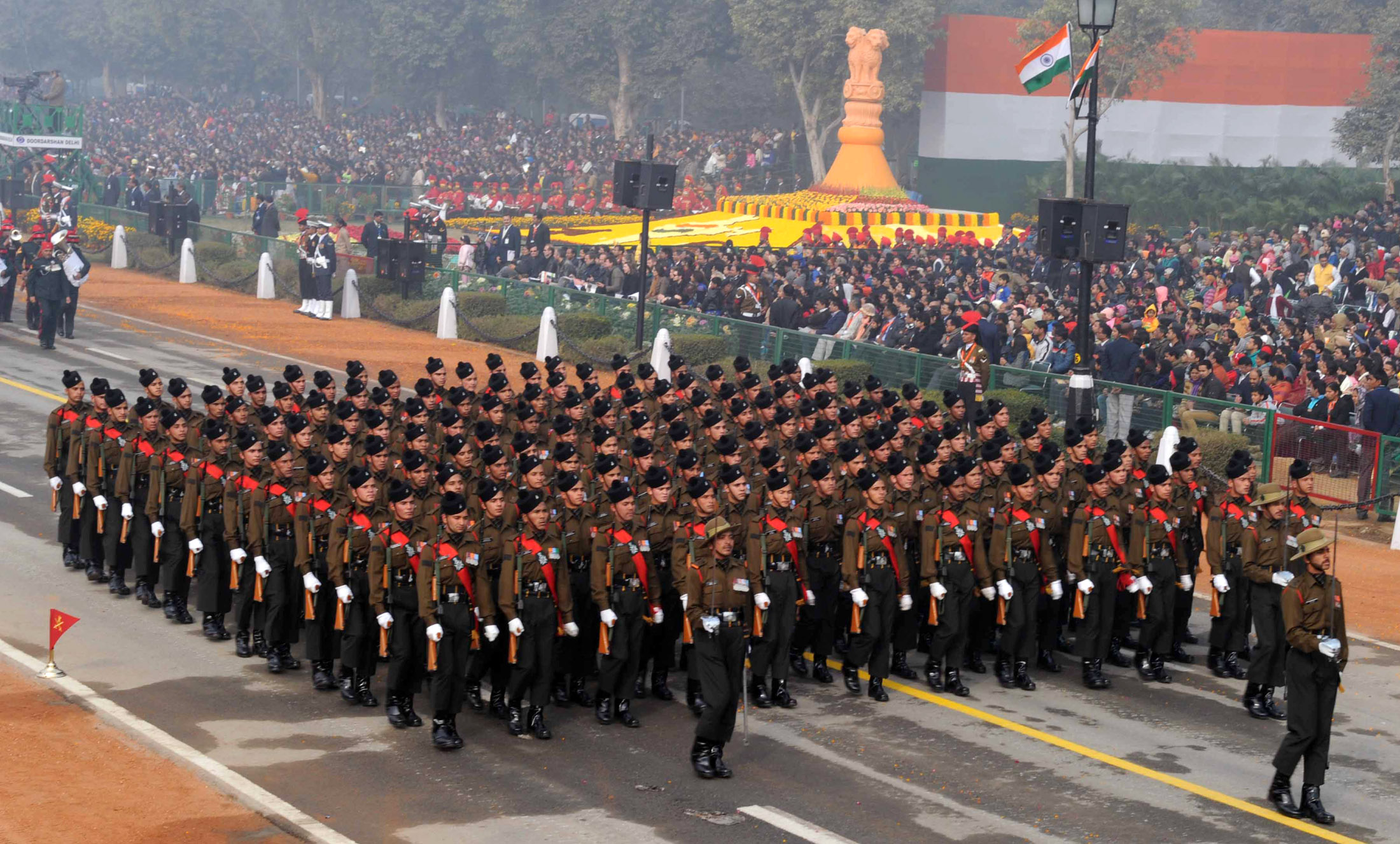
The Garhwal Rifles marching contingents passes through the Rajpath, on the occasion of the 67th Republic Day Parade, 2016

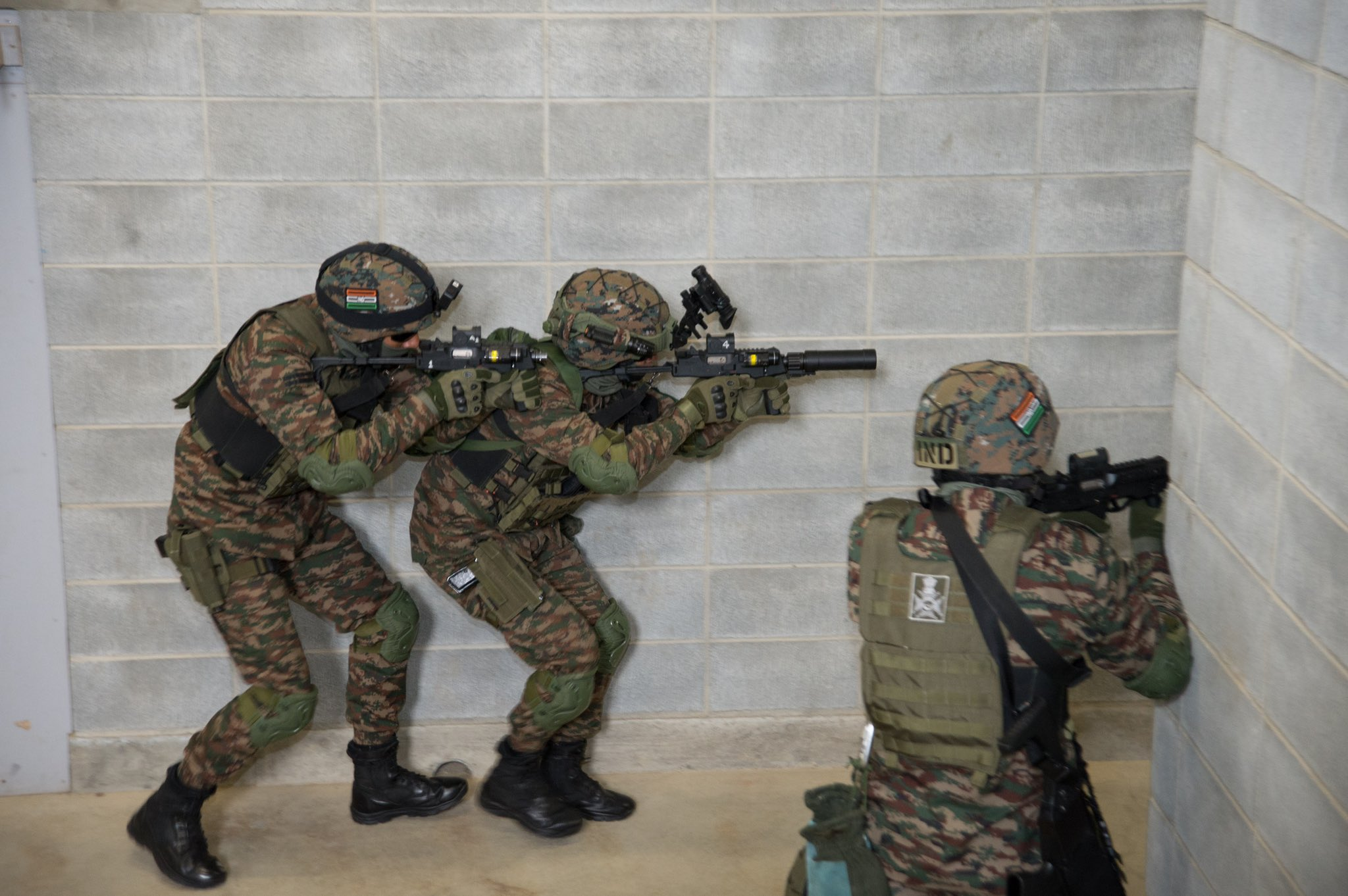
Soldiers of the Garhwal Rifles during Exercise Dharma Guardian 2022.

The following units are part of the Garhwal Rifles:

Present units

- 2nd Battalion (Victoria Cross Paltan, Neuve Chapelle, Superb Seconds)
- 3rd Battalion (Tithwal Battalion, The Third)
- 4th Battalion (Nuranang Battalion)
- 5th Battalion (Hilli Battalion)
- 6th Battalion
- 7th Battalion (Magnificent Seventh)
- 8th Battalion
- 9th Battalion
- 10th Battalion
- 11th Battalion
- 12th Battalion
- 13th Battalion
- 14th Battalion
- 15th Battalion
- 16th Battalion (Smashing Sixteenths)
- 17th Battalion (Batalik Kargil Battalian)
- 18th Battalion (Dras Battalion)
- 19th Battalion
- 20th Battalion
- 21st Battalion
- 22nd Battalion

Scouts

- Garhwal Scouts (Snow Leopards)

Territorial Army units

- 121 Infantry Battalion Territorial Army (Garhwal), Kolkata, West Bengal
- 127 Infantry Battalion Territorial Army (Ecological) (Garhwal), Dehradun, Uttarakhand

Rashtriya Rifles

- 14 Rashtriya Rifles
- 36 Rashtriya Rifles (The Gallants, The Gallant 36')
- 48 Rashtriya Rifles

Bhairav Light Commando Battalion

- 10 Bhairav

Former units

- 1st Battalion (Converted to 6 Mechanised Infantry)

== Battle honours ==
As on date the regiment has earned 44 battle honours. Of these, 13 have been awarded in the post-Independence period. The Regiment has also won the following theatre honours: Jammu and Kashmir — 1947–48, Punjab — 1965, Rajasthan — 1965, East Pakistan — 1971, Kargil — 1999.

Pre-World War I : (Note: Repugnant battle honours are marked with an asterisk superscript (like this ^{*}).) "Punjab Frontier 1897–98"^{*}.

World War I : "La Bassee 1914", "Armentieres 1914", "Festubert 1914–15", "Neuve Chapelle 1915", "Aubers 1915", "France and Flanders 1914–15", "Egypt 1915–16", "Khan Baghdadi 1918", "Sharqat 1918", "Mesopotamia 1917–18", "Macedonia 1918", "Afghanistan 1919".

World War II : (Note: Theatre honours are shown in italics.) "Gallabat 1940", "Barentu 1941", "Keren 1941", "Massawa 1941", "Amba Alagi 1941", "Abyssinia 1940–41", "North Africa 1940–43", "Kuantan", "Malaya 1941–42", "Yenangyuang 1942", "Monywa 1942", "North Arakan 1944", "Ngakydauk Pass 1944", "Ramree 1945", "Taungup 1945", "Burma 1942–45", "Citta di Castello 1944", "Italy 1943–45".

Post-Independence : "Tithwal 1947–48", "Jammu and Kashmir 1947–48", "Nuranang 1962", "Buttur Dograndi 1965", "Punjab 1965", "Gadra Road 1965", "Rajasthan 1965", "Hilli 1971", "East Pakistan 1971", "Operation Pawan 1988", "Batalik 1999", "Dras 1999", "Kargil 1999".

== Decorations ==
The Garhwal Rifles is one of the most decorated regiment in the Indian Army. The regiment has to its credit 3 Victoria Crosses, 1 Ashoka Chakra, 4 Maha Vir Chakras, 10 Kirti Chakras, 43 Vir Chakras, 49 Shaurya Chakras, 7 Param Vishisht Seva Medals, 1 Uttam Yudh Seva Medal, 25 Ati Vishisht Seva Medals (including 1 Bar), 13 Yudh Seva Medals, 122 Sena Medals (including 2 Bars), 30 Vishisht Seva Medals (including 2 Bars), 1 Jeevan Raksha Padak, 19 Chief of the Army Staff's Commendation (including 3 Bars), and 92 Mention in Dispatches,.

Decorations (Pre-Independence)

Victoria Cross Recipients:

- Naik Darwan Singh Negi - First World War, Festubert-France, 1914
- Rifleman Gabar Singh Negi (posthumous) - First World War, Neuve Chapelle, 1915
- Lieutenant William David Kenny (posthumous) - Waziristan Campaign, 1920

Decorations (Post-Independence)

Ashoka Chakra Recipients:

- Naik Bhawani Datt Joshi (posthumous), June 1984, Operation Blue Star, Amritsar, India for his actions during the operation against Sikh separatists

Maha Vir Chakra Recipients:

- Lieutenant Colonel Kaman Singh, Indo-Pakistani War of 1947-1948.
- Lieutenant Colonel B. M. Bhattacharya, Sino-Indian War, 1962
- Rifleman Jaswant Singh Rawat (posthumous), Sino-Indian War, 1962
- Captain Chandra Narayan Singh, Indo-Pakistani War of 1965.

Vir Chakra Recipient:

- Rifleman Kuldeep Singh Bhandari, Operation Pawan by Shanti Sena, 1988.
- Captain Jintu Gogoi, Operation Vijay, 1999

Kirti Chakra Recipients:

- Colonel (Retd.) then Major Ajay Kothiyal for leading a surgical strike on 12 May 2003 in Pulwama District in Kashmir.
- Subedar Ajay Vardhan

== Colonel of the Regiment ==
- Brig JT Evatt DSO (03.03.1914 - 24.03.1919)
- Maj Gen Sir JHK Stewart KCB, DSO (18.08.1939 - 30.11.1944)
- Lt Gen Sir RB Deedes KCB, OBE, MC (01.12.1944 - 31.05.1949)
- Maj Gen Hira Lal Atal (01.06.1949 - 01.06.1959)
- Maj Gen G Bharat Sewak Singh MC (05.07.1959 - 31.10.1970)
- Maj Gen HN Singhal PVSM, AVSM (01.11.1970 - 31.12.1978)
- Lt Gen K Mahendra Singh PVSM (24.04.1979 – 06.04.1988)
- Lt Gen Syed Ata Hasnain PVSM, UYSM, AVSM, SM, VSM** (01.01.2011 - 30.06.2013)
- Lt Gen Sarath Chand PVSM, UYSM AVSM, VSM, ADC (01.07.2013 - 04.05.2018)
- Lt Gen Cherish Mathson PVSM, SM, VSM (05.05.2018 - 04.08.2019)
- Lt Gen N. S. Raja Subramani AVSM, SM, VSM
- Lt Gen DS Rana PVSM, AVSM, YSM, SM, PhD

== Commemorative Postal Stamps ==
Commemorative stamps have been released by India Post.

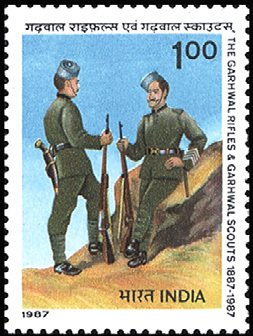
The Garhwal Rifles and Garhwal Scouts (1987)

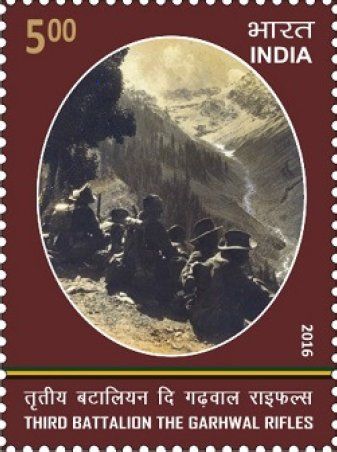
Third Battalion, The Garhwal Rifles (2016)

== See also ==
- Garhwal division
- Garhwali people
- List of Regiments of the Indian Army
- Kumaon Regiment
