= Dogra Regiment =

Infantry regiment of the Indian Army

- Regimental Insignia of the Dogra Regiment
- Active: 1877–present
- Country: India
- Branch: Indian Army
- Type: Line Infantry
- Regimental Centre: Ayodhya, Uttar Pradesh
- Nickname: Gentlemen Warriors
- Motto: Kartavyam Anvatma (Duty Before Death)
- War Cry: Jwala Mata Ki Jai (Victory to Mother Jwala)
- Mascot: Tiger
- Engagements: 1st Anglo-Afghan War; 2nd Anglo-Afghan War; World War I World War II; Indo-Pakistani War of 1947–1948; Sino-Indian War; Indo-Pakistani War of 1965; Indo-Pakistani War of 1971; Kargil War
- Decorations: 2 Victoria Cross; 44 Military Cross; 1 Ashoka Chakra; 13 Maha Vir Chakras; 9 Kirti Chakras; 16 Yudh Seva Medal; 46 Vir Chakras and 1 Bar; 1 Padma Bhushan; 2 Padma Shri; 21 Uttam Yudh Seva Medal; 24 Param Vishisht Seva Medal; 38 Ati Vishisht Seva Medal and 3 bar 58 Shaurya Chakras; 337 Sena Medals and 15 bar 31 Vishisht Seva Medal; 89 Mention-in-Despatches and 313 Chief of Army Staff Commendation Cards
- Battle honours: Jhangar, Rajauri, Uri, Asal Uttar, Haji Pir, Raja Picquet, OP Hill, Siramani, Suadih, Dera Baba Nanak and Chandgram Theatre Honours Jammu and Kashmir 1948, Punjab 1965 and Punjab 1971

Commanders
- Current commander: Lt General VM Bhuvana Krishnan
- Notable commanders: General Nirmal Chander Vij PVSM, UYSM, AVSM; General Gopal Gurunath Bewoor Padma Bhushan, PVSM; Lt Gen VK Jetley PVSM, UYSM, AVSM, VSM; Lt Gen PN Hoon PVSM, AVSM, YSM; Brigadier Mohammad Usman MVC; Lt Gen Ranbir Singh, PVSM, AVSM & Bar, YSM, SM, ADC

Insignia
- Regimental Insignia: Tiger revered as the mount of the Goddess Durga, who is a widely worshipped deity in the Dogra Hills

The Dogra Regiment is an infantry regiment of the Indian Army. The regiment traces its roots directly from the 17th Dogra Regiment of the British Indian Army. When transferred to the Indian Army like its sister regiments, the numeral prefix was removed. Dogra Regiment Units Maximum filled with Rajputs And Sikh. Units of the Dogra Regiment have fought in all conflicts that independent India has been engaged in, making it one of the most prestigious and most decorated regiments of the Indian Army.

== History ==
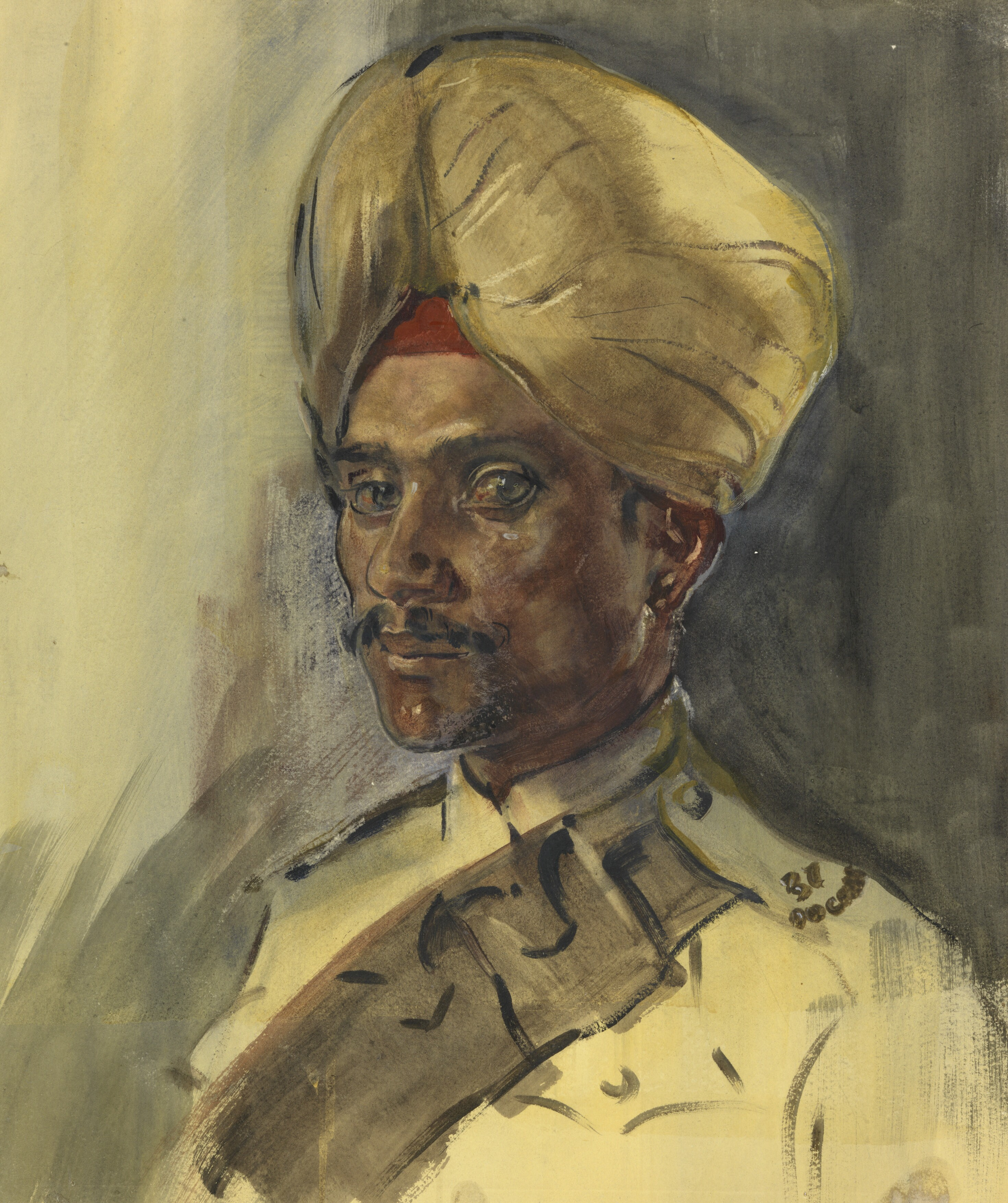
A sepoy of the 37th Dogras.

The Dogras, the inhabitants of 'Duggar' or Dogra land hail from the Indian states of Jammu and Kashmir, Himachal Pradesh and the hilly regions of Punjab. The Dogra Regiment traces its lineage to 1858, when the Agra Levy was raised by the British East India Company as part of the Bengal Army. The Dogras were added into the Bengal Army on the recommendation of Sir Fredrick Roberts, the then commander-in-chief of India, who decided to add a Dogra regiment because he was impressed by the loyalty and soldierly qualities of Dogra troops.The Agra Levy was later renamed the 38th Dogras. In 1887 the 37th (Dogra) Bengal Infantry was raised and later renamed the 37th (Prince of Wales's Own) Dogras. In 1900 the 41st (Dogra) Bengal Infantry was raised and also later renamed the 41st Dogras. In 1922 the Indian government reformed the army, moving from single battalion regiments to multi-battalion regiments. The 37th, 38th and 41st Dogras were all amalgamated into the 17th Dogra Regiment. It dropped '17th' from its title in 1945 and was allocated to India upon its independence in 1947.

The 38th Dogras served in the siege of Malakand in 1897 and during the First World War, served in Aden, Suez and Palestine during the battle of Megiddo. The 37th Dogras took part in the Chitral Expedition in 1895 and during the First World War, fought in the Second Battle of Kut and the capture of Baghdad as part of the 14th Indian Division. The 41st Dogras served in China from 1904 to 1908 as part of an international force, and then served on the Western Front and the Mesopotamia Campaign during World War I.

In 1949, Karan Singh, son of Maharaja Hari Singh, the last maharaja of the princely state of Jammu and Kashmir, was appointed Regent by his father. He wrote the Dogra Regiment's regimental song, 'Dikhi Lai Dogra Desh'.

Perhaps the best compliment given to the Dogras has come from Field Marshal Sir William Slim who wrote to them thus:

The Dogra proved themselves yet again a hardened and courageous fighter. Like his predecessors, he has been proud of his military heritage and has shown himself well versed in the art of war. Nor did he fail to live up to his age old reputation of combining courage with modesty and good manners as a gentleman should. I know from personal experience that in an army with many fine battalions, the Dogras have not merely upheld their brilliant reputation, but have added lustre to the pages of history of both their own regiment and of the Indian Army.

— Field Marshal William Slim, 1st Viscount Slim

=== Formation ===
The regiment was formed in 1922 through the amalgamation of three separate regiments of Dogras into the 17th Dogra Regiment. They were:

- 1st Battalion – formerly the 37th (Prince of Wales's Own) Dogras
- 2nd Battalion – formerly the 38th Dogras
- 3rd Battalion – formerly the 1st Battalion, 41st Dogras
- 10th (Training) Battalion – formerly the 2nd Battalion, 41st Dogras

The regiment has produced one Chief of Army Staff, Gen. Nirmal Chander Vij. Vij also served as the 10th Colonel-in-Chief of the Dogra Regiment and the Dogra Scouts.

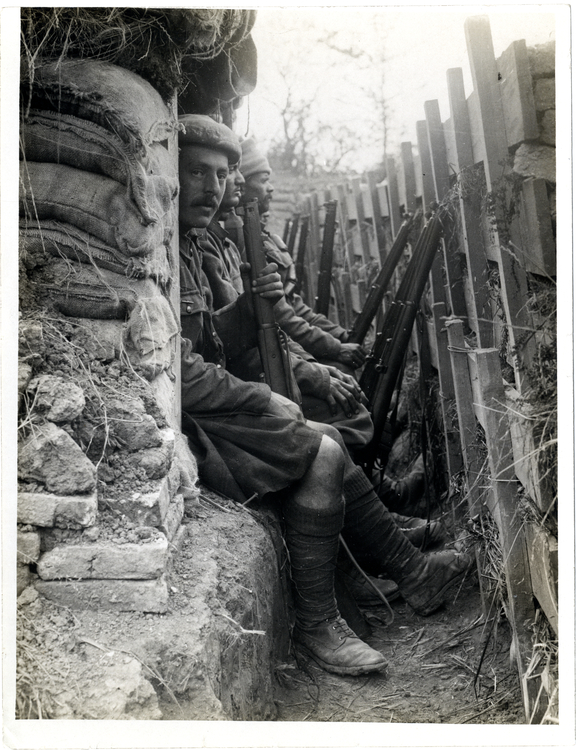
Dogras (along with Highlanders) in a trench with dugouts; Fauquissart, France.

=== Indo-Pakistani War of 1947–48 ===
Pakistani raiders had besieged and reduced Skardu in early 1948. It was vital that Leh, the next likely target, be relieved before it was attacked by the raiders. Major Thakur Prithi Chand, along with a band of 40 volunteers from the 2nd battalion, Dogra Regiment, began a hazardous mid-winter ascent of the Zojila pass on 16 February 1948, with rifles and ammunition for the garrison. They reached Leh on 8 March, where an ad hoc force for defence was organised, followed soon by a Jammu and Kashmir State Forces detachment bringing additional weapons.

=== Sino-Indian War ===
A company from the 4th battalion fought in the battle of Walong in November 1962 and suffered significant casualties against a vastly numerically superior Chinese force.

=== Indo-Pakistani War of 1965 ===
On September 2, 1965, the 3rd battalion, commanded by Lt. Col. R.B. Nair, was given the task to capture Point 7702 in Jammu and Kashmir. The brigade then planned two battalion attacks with the 2nd battalion, Sikh Regiment on the left to clear the Raja picket and the 3rd battalion, Dogra Regiment on the right to capture point 7702. The battalion left late in the evening on September 5, and successfully sneaked past Raja picket. The two leading companies were to assault from the left flank and cross the start line at 04:00 on September 6 under the able leadership of Maj. Greesh Chandra Verma and Capt. Gurdev Singh Bawa. B and C companies stormed point 7702 at 05:00 on September 6. After a fierce hand-to-hand and bunker-to-bunker fight, the enemy was uprooted from the strongly built defences and the post was captured by 05:45.

Maj. G.C. Verma was wounded in the head and refused to be evacuated. He died on seeing the success signal being fired from his pistol by Sub. Rattan Singh. Capt. G.S. Bawa, the other assaulting company commander was also wounded fatally while silencing an enemy MMG. The battalion lost two officers, one JCO and 14 ORs while 3 officers, 2 JCOs and 60 ORs were wounded in the battle. 39 men of enemy were killed and 5 were taken as POWs.

In recognition of this valour the battalion was awarded the battle honour Chand Tekri and theatre honour of Jammu and Kashmir 1965.

2nd battalion, Dogra Regiment led the famed OP Hill attack on November 2, 1965, to capture a strategic location in Mendhar area of Jammu and Kashmir. This is regarded as one of the bloodiest battles fought by the Indian Army. Maj GS Pall led the Delta company up the steep and open hill towards Kala Pathar, a frontal attack under heavy machine gun and mortar fire, with the hillside strewn with landmines, followed by Charlie and Alpha companies. Meanwhile 7th Battalion of Sikh Regiment and 5th Battalion of Sikh Li Regiment troops flanked the enemy. Dogras suffered heavy casualties throughout the night but refused to withdraw, eventually meeting up with the Sikh and Sikh Li troops for the capture. Many awards were earned posthumously, including officers, JCOs and Jawans. 2nd Dogras earned a Battle Honour for this famed battle. An impressive memorial stands at the site today commemorating the battle and the bravery of 2nd Dogras.

=== Indo-Pakistani War of 1971 ===
On the eastern front, the 9th battalion was responsible for the fall of Suadih, a small village in East Pakistan that was a strong bastion of the Pakistan Army's most fortified position in the country. This led to the ultimate liberation of East Pakistan and a victory for the Indian Army. For this task, 9 Dogra was awarded the battle honour of Suadih.

The 5th battalion was posted in Asal Uttar, Punjab, where it was assigned to accord depth to the defences of Khem Karan.

=== Kargil War ===
The 5th battalion fought in the Kargil War to capture Tiger Hill.

=== UN Peacekeeping ===
The Dogra Regiment has not only contributed to the United Nations Peacekeeping Forces in the Gaza Strip, Korea, and the Congo, but has also contributed in providing various military observers in various peace keeping operation around the globe. The 1st, 3rd and 9th battalions have participated in UN peacekeeping missions.

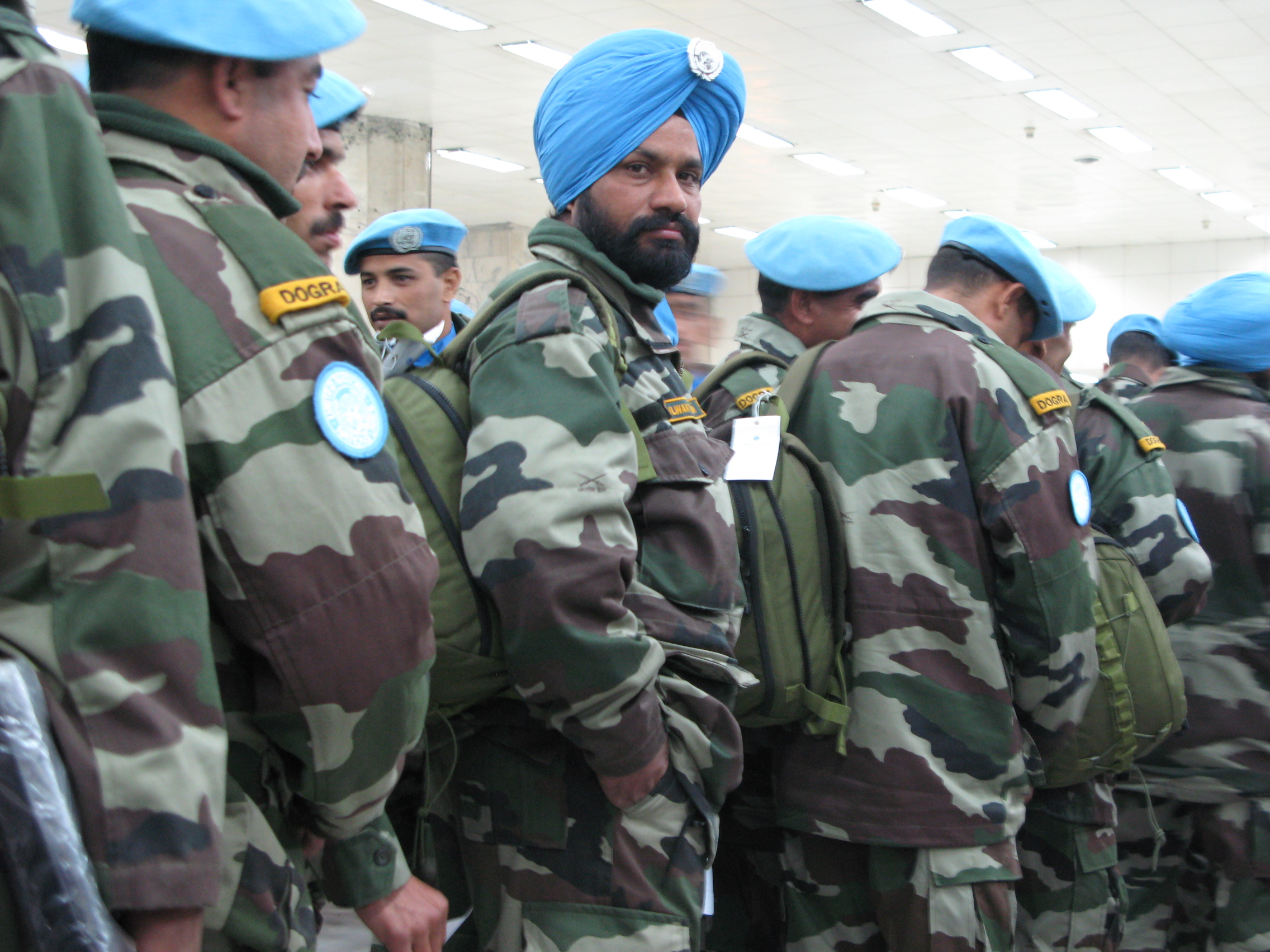
Dogra Regiment troops, along with a Sikh non-Dogra Regiment soldier, on UN duty.

== Recruitment ==
Dogra regiment has a fixed class composition: 50 percent from Himachal Pradesh, 25 percent from Jammu and Kashmir, and a balance from Hoshiarpur, SBS Nagar, Pathankot, Gurdaspur, and Rupnagar districts of Punjab. Enlisting in army is seen as honourable pursuit for Dogras; soldiering has not only become a substantial part of the economic structure of the Dogra hills, but created social and cultural traditions built on the people's association with the army.

== Regimental Centre ==
Initially, the Dogra battalions were raised in various different places by the British Indian Army, with each having their own depot. After the first World War, a common depot was formed, which was later termed the Training Battalion (later the 10th Battalion). In 1943, the Training Battalion ceased to exist and was renamed The Dogra Regimental Centre. After independence, the regimental centre was established in Meerut, Uttar Pradesh in 1952. It was moved to Faizabad Cantonment, Uttar Pradesh, in June 1976, where it is currently located.

== Units ==
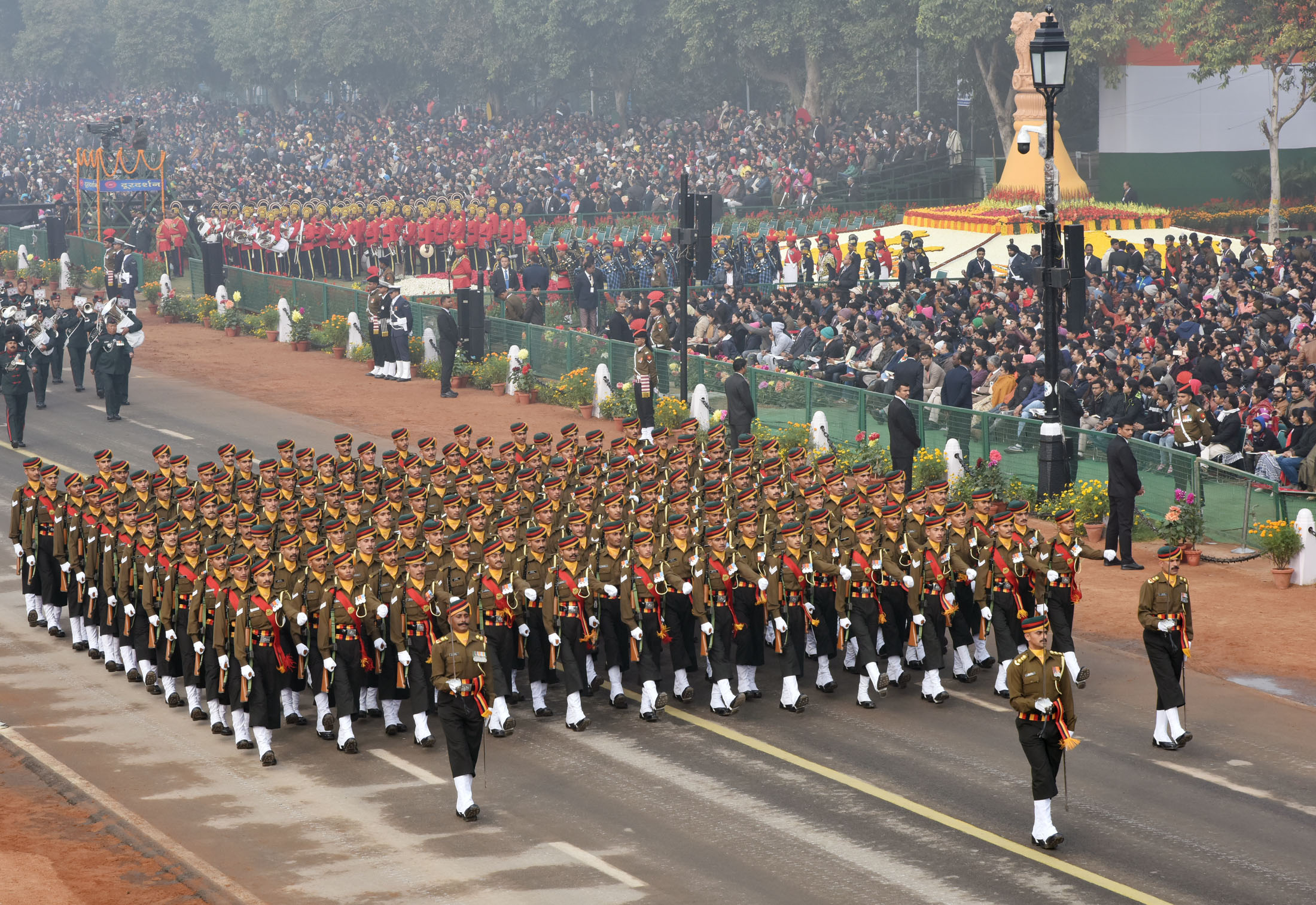
The Dogra Regiment Marching Contingent passes through the Rajpath, on the occasion of the 69th Republic Day Parade 2018, in New Delhi.

- 2nd Battalion – The Great Second
- 3rd Battalion – Mighty Third
- 4th Battalion – Char Satara
- 5th Battalion – Five The Formidable
- 6th Battalion – Soaring Six
- 7th Battalion – Unbeaten Seven
- 8th Battalion – Elite Eight
- 9th Battalion – Suadih Paltan
- 10th Battalion – Shaktishali Dus
- 11th Battalion – Elite Eleven
- 12th Battalion – Towering Twelfth
- 13th Battalion – Siramani
- 14th Battalion – Fabulous Fourteen
- 15th Battalion – Fighting Fifteenth
- 16th Battalion – Sovereign Sixteen
- 17th Battalion – Smashing Seventeen
- 18th Battalion – Ashok Chakra Paltan
- 19th Battalion – Dynamic Nineteen (Dogra battalion raised with a mixed class composition on 11 February 1985)
- 20th Battalion - Leaping Tigers
- 21st Battalion - Roaring Twenty-one
- Dogra Scouts – Tangrors (the mountain warriors)

Rashtriya Rifles (RR)

- 11 Rashtriya Rifles
- 20 Rashtriya Rifles
- 40 Rashtriya Rifles
- 62 Rashtriya Rifles

Territorial Army (TA)

The regiment also has 4 Territorial Army battalions.

- 112th Infantry Battalion (Territorial Army) (based at Jalandhar, Punjab)
- 153rd Infantry Battalion (Territorial Army) (based at Meerut, Uttar Pradesh)
- 159th Infantry Battalion (Territorial Army) (Home & Hearth) (based at Thalela, Jammu and Kashmir)
- 133rd Infantry Battalion (Territorial Army) (Ecological) (based at Shimla, Himachal Pradesh)

Other facts:

- 1st Battalion was transformed in 1981 into the 7th Battalion, Mechanised Infantry Regiment
- The battalions have participated in various UN missions; the 3rd battalion have served in Korea, the 1st battalion has served in Congo, the 9th battalion has served in Gaza and the 5th battalion has served in Sierra Leone. The 3rd battalion was the first-ever battalion of the Indian Army to go on a UN mission.
- The 4th battalion has the additional honour of being the first battalion of the Indian Army to be deployed on the Siachen Glacier.

== Affiliations ==
In the year 1990 affiliations of Indian Navy ships were being done with the Indian Army Regiments, INS Ranvijay was affiliated with the Dogra Regiment in 1997. Apart from this, the Dogra's are also affiliated with the Regiment of Artillery (14 Medium Regiment and 15 Medium Regiment). Even the Dogra's are also affiliated with the Armoured Corps (71st Armoured Regiment).

== Battle honours ==
Two battalions of the 17th Dogra Regiment (the 2nd and 3rd), also fought in the Malayan Campaign. After the Fall of Singapore, a large number of the captured troops later went on to join the Indian National Army.

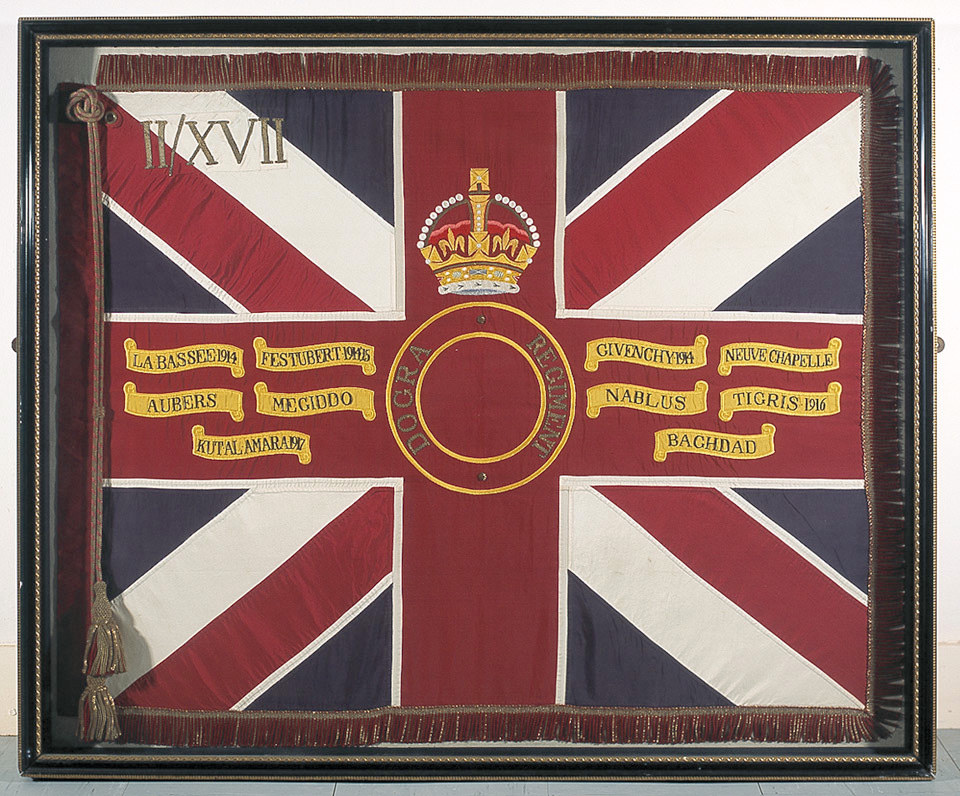
King's Colour 2/17th Dogra Regiment, 1926–1947

=== Pre-independence ===
Combined battle honours of 37th (Prince of Wales's Own) Dogras, 38th Dogras, 41st Dogras:

=== World War I ===
- La Bassée 1914
- Festubert 1914–1915
- Givenchy 1914
- Neuve Chapelle
- Aubers
- France and Flanders 1914–15
- Egypt 1915
- Megiddo
- Nablus
- Palestine 1918
- Tigris 1916
- Kut al-Amara 1917
- Wadi
- El Hanna
- Baghdad
- Mesopotamia 1915–18
- Aden
- Megiddo – 1918
- Nablus – 1918
- Palestine – 1918
- North-West Frontier 1915–1917
- Afghanistan 1919

=== World War II ===
- Kota Bharu
- Malaya 1941–42
- Singapore 1941–42
- Donbaik
- Wrencat
- Nunshigum
- Magwe
- Kennedy Peak
- Burma 1942–45

=== Post-independence ===
- Jhangar 1947
- Barwali 1947
- Rajauri 1947
- Jammu and Kashmir 1947–48
- Hajipir
- Raja Picquet-Chand Tekri
- OP Hill (NL 1053)
- Tiger Hill-1999
- Uri
- Poonch
- Jammu and Kashmir 1965
- Asal Uttar
- Dograi
- Punjab 1965
- Suadhi
- Siramani
- Chauddagram
- East Pakistan 1971
- Ferozpur
- Dera Baba Nanak

== Colonels of the Dogra Regiment ==
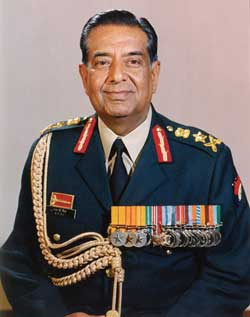
Gen. N.C. Vij, the 20th Chief of Army Staff and the first Dogra Regiment officer to hold the title.

- Lieutenant General Kalwant Singh
- Lieutenant General M.S. Pathania PVSM
- Major General M.G. Hazari PVSM, AVSM
- Major General Mohan Lal PVSM
- Lieutenant General P.N. Hoon PVSM, AVSM, SM
- Lieutenant General V.K. Jetley PVSM, VSM
- Lieutenant General V.K. Sood PVSM, AVSM, PhD
- Lieutenant General Sher Amir Singh PVSM, AVSM
- Lieutenant General H.S. Bedi PVSM, VSM
- Lieutenant General Surjit Singh PVSM, AVSM, VSM
- General N.C. Vij PVSM, UYSM, AVSM, ADC
- Lieutenant General S.S. Sanga PVSM, AVSM, VSM, SM
- Lieutenant General J.K. Mohanty PVSM, UYSM, AVSM, VSM, SM, ADC
- Lieutenant General Jasbir Singh Dhaliwal PVSM, AVSM, VSM
- Lieutenant General A.K. Singh PVSM, AVSM, VSM, SM
- Lieutenant General G.S. Dhillon PVSM, VSM, YSM, SM
- Brig Jagmohan Varma, SM, VSM
- Lieutenant General Ranbir Singh AVSM**, YSM, SM, ADC
- Lieutenant General Jai Singh Nain AVSM, SM, ADC
- Lt General VM Bhuvana Krishnan AVSM, YSM

== Gallantry Awards ==
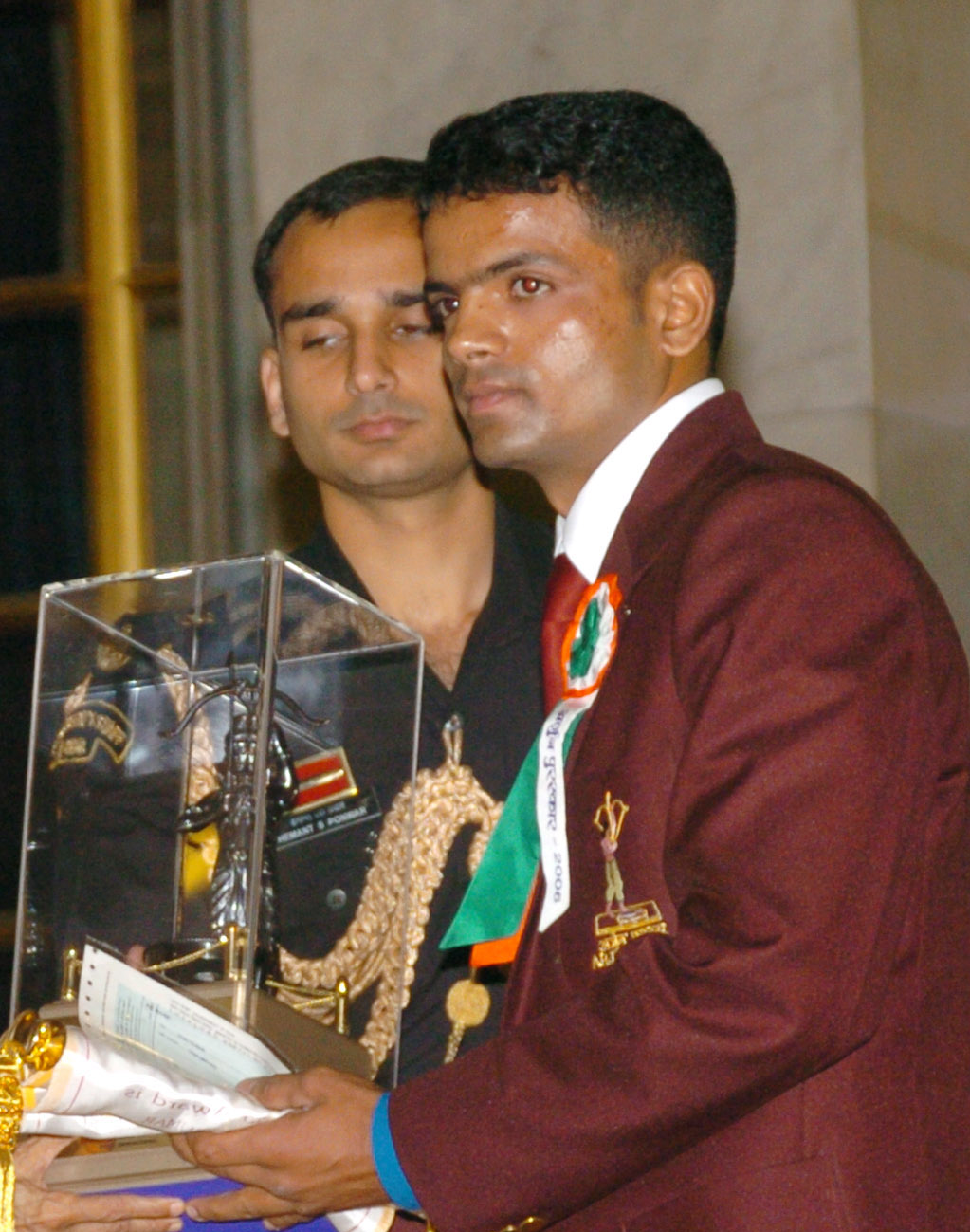
Vijay Kumar receiving the 2006 Arjuna Award for shooting

Before Indian independence, the Dogras had to their credit two Victoria Crosses and 44 Military Crosses besides 312 other awards including 2 unit Citations. Some awardees include :

- Brigadier John Alexander Sinton VC – 37th Dogras
- Lance Naik Lala VC – 41st Dogras
- Major R.C. Dunlop MC
- Major R.C. Christie MC
- Subedar Narsinghu MC
- Lance Naik Janak Singh MC
- Colonel Thakur Prithi Chand MVC
- Lieutenant Colonel Kushal Chand MVC
- Brigadier Narinder Singh Sandhu MVC
- Brigadier Mohammad Usman MVC
- Capt Devinder Singh Ahlawat MVC
- Sub. Major and Hony. Capt. Bhim Chand, VrC & bar
- Major Sandeep Shankla AC
- Colonel K.J. Singh SC**, SM
- Major Sunil Shetty Sena Medal (SM)
- Honorary Captain Vijay Kumar Sharma Padma Shri, AVSM, SM
- Colonel Anil Kumar KC
- Sub. Major and Hony. Capt. Chhering Norbu Bodh, SC

The following battalions of the regiment have also been awarded the Chief of Army Staff's Unit Citation:

- 2nd Battalion
- 5th Battalion (2 unit citations)
- 7th Battalion
- 8th Battalion (2 unit citations)
- 10th Battalion
- 14th Battalion
- 19th Battalion
- 21st Battalion
- 11 Rashtriya Rifles
- 40 Rashtriya Rifles

== See also ==
- List of regiments of the Indian Army
