= 176 Medium Regiment (India) =

Indian Army artillery unit

- Active: 1967 – present
- Country: India
- Allegiance: India
- Branch: Indian Army
- Type: Artillery
- Size: Regiment
- Nicknames: Dogra Gunners, Ek Saat Chheh
- Mottos: Sarvatra, Izzat-O-Iqbal (Everywhere with Honour and Glory) हर मैदान फतेह (Har Maidan Fateh)
- Colors: Red & Navy Blue
- Anniversaries: 1 March – Raising Day
- Equipment: 155 mm guns

Insignia
- Abbreviation: 176 Med Regt

176 Medium Regiment is part of the Regiment of Artillery of the Indian Army.

== Formation ==
The regiment was raised on 1 March 1967 at Neelasandra Lines in Bangalore as 176 Field Regiment. The first commanding officer was Lieutenant Colonel O P Joseph. The regiment was subsequently converted to a medium regiment in 2011. The regiments consists of headquarters battery and 1761, 1762 and 1763 medium batteries.

== Class composition ==
The regiment was raised with Dogra troops, which were posted in from the following existing artillery regiments –

- 12 Field Regiment
- 14 Field Regiment (presently 14 Medium Regiment)
- 15 Field Regiment (presently 15 Medium Regiment)
- 32 Light Regiment (presently 32 Field Regiment)
- 167 Field Regiment (presently 167 Medium Regiment)

== Operations ==
The regiment has taken part in the following operations –

- Indo-Pakistani War of 1971 - The unit was equipped with 100 mm field guns and was commanded by Lieutenant Colonel H S Sarao, SM. It was part of 26 Artillery Brigade and took part in the operations between 2 and 17 December 1971 in the Sialkot sector. It provided fire support to 36 and 19 Infantry Brigades during the war. A OP team consisting of Captain RS Bajwa, Second Lieutenant BS Patil and their troops were in support of 4 Dogra and were amongst the first men from the regiment to step into enemy territory. On 3 December at 2300 hours, 1762 Field Battery engaged and successfully neutralised a Pakistani battery at Sidh. On the morning 5 December 1763 Field Battery engaged enemy medium machine guns from Gondala gun area.
  On 7 December at 0500 hours, the regiment reconnaissance party moved into the Chicken's neck area, which the regiment had engaged in support of 19 Infantry Brigade. On 8 December at 0400 hours, under Second Lieutenant CM Bali, the Gun Position Officer, 1761 Field Battery crossed the international border and deployed on Pakistani soil. On 13 December, as the situation in Chhamb sector had stabilised, 1761 battery moved back inside the border after firing 731 rounds (charge full) and 333 rounds (charge reduced) during its stay in the chicken's neck area.
  On the night of 7 December 1762 Field Battery and Regiment Headquarter moved from Badiyal Brahmana and was deployed at Kirpind. On 9 December at 0100 hours, the regiment fired at Chak Salarian and Nandpur in support of the successful raids carried out by 4 Dogra and 17 Jat respectively. At 2200 hours, D Troop from 1762 Field Battery moved again to Badiyal Brahmana and stayed there till 0350 hours engaging the Pakistani 15 Division Headquarter location, 104 Infantry Brigade Headquarter location and hostile guns. On 16 December at 0300 hrs, 1762 Field Battery accurately engaged Jolan in support of 4 Dogra. On 17 December, the enemy's MMGs at Chumbian were silenced by 1763 Field Battery. At 0300 hours, Chote Chak post was attacked by a company of 4 Dogra with Captain RS Bajwa as OP officer and successfully captured. This was followed by a counterattack by the enemy along with heavy bombardment. Captain Bajwa promptly established an OP on top of a tree and effectively engaged the targets foiling the enemy plans.
  One battery was moved from Jammu sector and deployed inside chicken's neck to support 52 Infantry Brigade. This battery fired around 1,300 rounds and helped stem the Pakistani advance.
- Flood relief operations – The unit moved to Hathigarh in Assam on 17 June 1980 and was under the command of Lieutenant Colonel S K Chaturvedi. During this tenure, a task force from the regiment consisting of two officers, one JCO and forty other ranks provided relief to flood affected villagers of Mangaldai Sub-Division in August 1980. Hundreds of marooned persons and cattle were rescued during this operation. The two officers were awarded COAS Commendation Cards in January 1982 for their efficient work done during the relief operations.
- Operation Trident – the unit participated in two different Infantry Division sections in 1987.
- Operation Rakshak II – the regiment took part in counter-insurgency operations in Punjab between August 1991 to July 1992. Personnel from the unit were awarded one Sena Medal and two GOC-in-C Northern Command Commendation Cards.
- Operation Meghdoot – the unit under Colonel A K Choudhary was deployed in the highest battlefield in the world – Siachen Glacier. The regiment was equipped with 105 mm Indian Field Guns and it was awarded 7 GOC-in-C Northern Command Commendation Cards during this tenure.
- Operation Vijay
- Operation Parakram

== Conversion to medium regiment ==
The unit moved to Punjab in October 2011 and was converted to a medium regiment, being equipped with 155 mm guns (130 mm M-46 Field Gun upgraded to 155 mm version by Soltam Systems).

== Motto and war cry ==
The motto of the regiment is हर मैदान फतेह (Har Maidan Fateh), which translates to Victory in every field. The war cry of the regiment is जय दुर्गे (Jai Durge).

== Honours and achievements ==
The regiment has been awarded the following awards –

- GOC-in-C South Western Command Unit Appreciation – the regiment was awarded this honour on 14 January 2016.
- Sena Medal – 1
- COAS Commendation Cards – 10
- VCOAS Commendation Card – 1
- GOC-in-C Commendation Cards – 35
- Force Commander's Commendation Card (UNDOF) – 1
- Colonel Commandant of the Regiment appreciation cards – 9
- DG Arty Medallion - 01

== See also ==
- List of artillery regiments of Indian Army
