= Lala (VC) =

Recipient of the Victoria Cross

Jemadar Lala VC
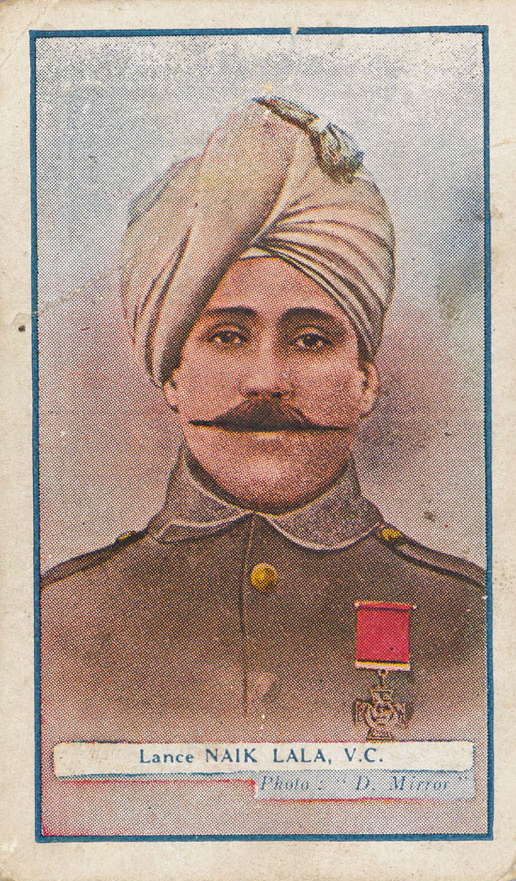
- 'Lance Naik Lala, V.C.', 1916
- Born: 20 April 1876; Kangra, British India
- Died: 23 March 1927 (aged 50)
- Military career
- Branch: British Indian Army
- Rank: Jemadar
- Units: 41st Dogras
- Conflicts: World War I
- Awards: Victoria Cross; Cross of St. George

Lala Ram VC (20 April 1876 – 23 March 1927) was an Indian recipient of the Victoria Cross, the highest and most prestigious award for gallantry in the face of the enemy that can be awarded to British and Commonwealth soldiers.

== Details ==
Lala Ram was born at Parol village,Hamirpur, Kangra district in then the Punjab province, on 20 April 1876. Some accounts give 20 Feb. 1882. If 1876 is correct, he would have been nearly 40 when he earned the VC in 1916. The son of Dhinga, a 1st Grade zamindar, he was apparently not formally educated but could read and write Hindi and enlisted in the newly raised (1900) 41st Dogra regiment in 1901; he was by all accounts a good sportsman and a football player in his regiment. Before the war, he served with the 41st in their deployment to the China coast between 1904-1908.

In August 1923, Lala was commissioned as Jemadar, which means that his war record and his career become more easily traceable. "War Services" in Indian Army Lists show that he served initially in Egypt on the Suez Canal defences and then went with his regiment to France, where he was wounded in action and was one of those Indian casualties who were nursed in the converted Brighton Pavilion, adapted as a hospital for Indian soldiers on the grounds that Indians might feel more at home in the "eastern" architecture of that exotic building!

On recovery, he joined his regiment in Mesopotamia. British and Indian forces (forming Expeditionary Force "D") had landed in the Persian Gulf as early as November 1914, initially only to secure the oil refineries at the head of the Shatt-al-Arab and around Basra. However, the commanding officer, General Charles Townshend, was drawn into a much larger campaign and, convinced he could take Baghdad, advanced up the Tigris. Defeating the Turks at Qurna, Es Sinn and Nasiriya, he fought the desperate three-day action at Ctesiphon in November 1915 but such were his losses in that pyrrhic victory that he was forced to retreat to Kut -al-Amara and there began the infamous "siege of Kut", which culminated in April 1916 with one of the most humiliating defeats in British military history - the surrender of the entire garrison, many of whom went on to face horrific conditions as Turkish prisoners of war.

While the siege lasted, British and Indian reinforcements on a large scale were dispatched to Mesopotamia and made a series of hard fought but ultimately futile attempts to relieve the besieged garrison. Tens of thousands of casualties were suffered in the repeated attempts to break through a series of well-defended Turkish positions along the Tigris and en route to Kut.

In one of these desperate enterprises, Lala was to win the Victoria Cross. The 41st Dogras were part of the force which, along with the 2nd Black Watch, 9th Bhopals, 37th Dogras and 6th Jats, assaulted the Turkish entrenchments near the ruins of Al Orah on the Tigris close to the Hanna defile, 30 miles down-river from Kut. Here, the relief force (reduced to around 10,000 men) encountered 30,000 men of the Ottoman Sixth Army; after a short bombardment on 20–21 January 1916, the 7th Division attacked the Ottoman lines. In an advance across 600 yards of flooded no-man's land and later in pouring rain, the British force was beaten back, sustaining 2,700 casualties. According to their War Diary, only 25 men of the 41st reach the enemy trenches and the regiment came out of action with only 155 officers and men. The strength of the well-prepared Ottoman positions forced the abandonment of the assault and the withdrawal of the relief force to the base at Ali Gharbi.

Lance Naik Lala was rewarded with the VC for his action in rescuing a number of wounded men shortly after the assault on 21 January. The citation in the London Gazette reads:

'For most conspicuous bravery. Finding a British officer of another regiment lying close to the enemy, he dragged him into a temporary shelter, which he himself had made, and in which he had already bandaged four wounded men. After bandaging his wounds, he heard calls from the Adjutant of his own regiment, who was lying in the open severely wounded. The enemy were not more than one hundred yards distant, and it seemed certain death to go out in that direction, but Lance-Naik Lala insisted on going out to his Adjutant, and offered to crawl back with him on his back at once. When this was not permitted, he stripped off his own clothing to keep the wounded officer warmer, and stayed with him till just before dark, when he returned to the shelter. After dark he carried the first wounded officer back to the main trenches, and then, returning with a stretcher, carried back his Adjutant. He set a magnificent example of courage and devotion to his officers' (London Gazette 13 May 1916).

In effect, Lala rescued six men, including his own Adjutant (Captain E.L.E. Lindop M.C., who regrettably died of his wounds on 30 January 1916, though not before relating Lala's bravery), but the citation hardly does justice to the awful circumstances surrounding Lala's efforts. Other descriptions offer a more in-depth account, especially emphasising not only the danger from close Turkish fire, but also the terrible weather conditions which prevailed on the day. Edmund Candler, in The Sepoy reports one of Lala's officers relating that: Lala was out all day and most of the night and earned his VC a dozen times. It seemed certain death to go out ... with the enemy only a hundred yards off. But he insisted on going out .... There was a freezing wind and the wounded lay in pools of rain and flooded marsh all night; some were drowned, others died of exposure. It was a typically Dogra-like act of Lala to strip himself and to make a shield of his body for his Adjutant ... and the Adjutant was only one of five officers and comrades [actually six] whom Lala saved that day". No less a figure than Major General Sir George Younghusband, who commanded the 7th division, relates the events in greater detail in A Soldier's Memories of Peace and War:

A heavy frontal attack was taking place across the dead flat open ground before the Turkish trenches, which were strongly held. On our left, the attack partially succeeded but all along the rest of the line it was held up at distances varying from 100 to 500 yards from the Turks. At this moment Sepoy (now Lance Naik) Lalla [sic] came across a Major in his regiment, 150 yards from the enemy line, lying completely exposed in the open and trying to bandage a grievous wound. Lalla dragged him a few yards into a very slight depression, only a few inches deep, and there bound up the Major's wounds. Whilst doing so, he heard other cries for help and sallying forth dragged four more of his comrades into the meagre shelter and bound up their wounds. Meanwhile, it had come on to rain hard and a pitiless icy wind sprang up. Then Lalla heard another voice calling for help about fifty yards to the front and only a hundred yards from the Turkish trenches. He recognised the voice and said to the Major: "That is my Adjutant Sahib calling. I must go out to help him". "No, Lalla, it is quite useless", said the Major; "You will certainly be shot dead and therefore be of no use". Then, seeing that Lalla was still determined to go, the Major said: I order you not to go; lie down". Lalla lay still for a while and then again heard the voice from the front calling for help. Lalla jumped up and said "I'll be back in a minute" and dashed off to the Adjutant. This officer, just before he was taken into the operating room in hospital, where he died, dictated his account to a brother officer: "I was shot down in the open about a hundred yards from the enemy and lay in great agony. An officer of the Black Watch, who was lying a few yards off, tried to crawl to my assistance but was instantly shot dead. Every time I made the slightest movement, bullets whistled past me or through me. Then came a Sepoy to my assistance and he was also shot dead. Then it came on to rain and a bitter wind sprang up. Then, as I lay in great pain, suddenly appeared Lalla and lay down beside me with cheering words. First he bound up my wounds and then taking off his own coat spread it over me. He then lay down lengthways so as to protect me from the enemy's bullets. For five hours he lay like this in the wet and cold and all the time kept talking to me cheerfully and encouragingly to keep my spirits up. At length, when it grew dark, he crept off and said he was going back to get assistance and would soon return. I slept or dozed for some time and then heard Lalla's return. "It is good, Sahib, very good. I have brought up some stretcher-bearers not far from here. I will lie flat whilst you get on my back and then I will crawl away with you on my hands and knees". With great difficulty the Adjutant obeyed these instructions and was borne painfully many hundreds of yards by Lalla to the stretcher bearers. Then Lalla said: "I must return now and fetch the Major and the four Sepoys". And this he did, and brought them all safely out. And, wonderful to relate, he was not touched by bullet or shell, all day or all night. Next morning he was as hale and cheerful as ever and grinned with great joy when he heard that he was a brave man! The Victoria Cross had only recently been granted to Indian soldiers and perhaps there is no worthier wearer of the badge of honour than Lance Naik Lalla of the Dogras". (pp. 334–336)

Lala was also awarded the 1st Class of the Russian Cross of St. George (AO 1065 of 1917) – a unique combination to an Indian soldier – and Mentioned in Dispatches (L.G. 17 Oct. 1916). Lala returned to India in 1917. The Governor-General of India, Lord Chelmsford, at a special parade on Tuesday, 30 January 1917, at the vice-regal lodge, Delhi, India, presented medals and orders to 200 Indian officers and men including the Victoria Cross to Lance-Naik Lala, 41st Dogras, and two other Indian soldiers.

Lala saw further action as a Havildar with the 41st Dogras in the Third Afghan War in 1919. He was later awarded the Meritorious Service Medal in the re-numbered 3-17 Dogras, in addition to gaining advancement to officer rank as Jemadar in 1923. He retired after 25 years' service in 1926 and returned to his home in Parol but sad to say did not live long to enjoy an honourable retirement. He contracted polio and died in March 1927; his remains were cremated there shortly afterwards. It is said that his last words were "We fought true".

Nowadays, Lala Ram takes an honoured place amongst India's winners of the Victoria Cross and was named on a memorial plaque recently presented by Great Britain to the Indian Government to commemorate their VC winners. At one stage, a local park was named after him and although it was subsequently re-named there are calls for it to be restored under his name. Sadly, his V.C. group has not fared well. His actual Victoria Cross has never been found and the remnants of his medal group turned up in a dealer's box in India – but comprised only his British War Medal, India General Service Medal and M.S.M.

== The Medal ==
His British War Medal, India General Service Medal with clasp "Afghanistan/NWF 1919" and his Meritorious Service Medal survive and have several times been for sale, most recently in auction in London in June 2013. and then on a medal-dealer's site. The whereabouts of his actual VC are unknown and his Russian Gold Cross of St. George is equally "missing".

== Awards and decorations ==

Victoria Cross	1914–15 Star		British War Medal
Victory Medal	India General Service Medal (Afghanistan NWF 1919)	Indian Meritorious Service Medal	Cross of St. George (1st Class)
