= 71st Armoured Regiment (India) =

Indian Army regiment

71 Armoured Regiment
- Active: 1971 – present
- Country: India
- Allegiance: India
- Branch: Indian Army
- Type: Armoured Corps
- Size: Regiment
- Mottos: शत्रुनाश; Shatrunash (Destruction of the enemy)
- Colors: Purple, Red and Gold
- Equipment: T-90 tanks

Commanders
- Colonel of the Regiment: General Dhiraj Seth
- Notable commanders: Major-General Aneet Singh Sihota, VSM; Lieutenant General Kotheneth Surendranath, AVSM**, SM, VSM; Major General Amardeep Bhardwaj

Insignia
- Abbreviation: 71 Armd Regt

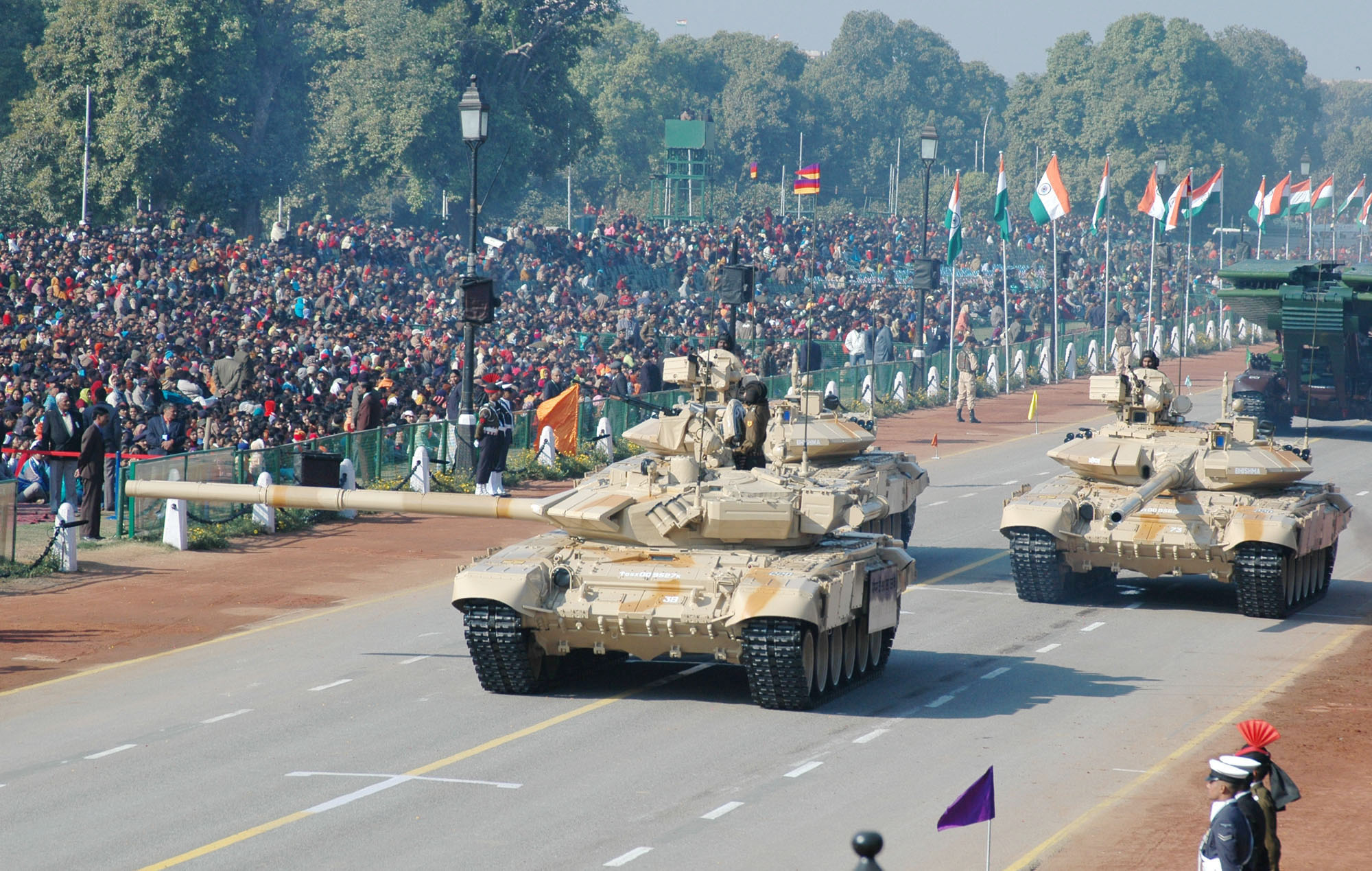
T-90 tanks of the 71 Armoured Regiment during the rehearsal of the Republic Day Parade, 2008

71 Armoured Regiment is an armoured regiment of the Indian Army.

== Formation ==
The regiment was raised on 1 January 1971 at Ahmednagar by Lieutenant Colonel (later Brigadier) Brijinder Singh Chimni. The regiment has a squadron each of Jats, Dogras and South Indian Classes.

== Equipment ==
The regiment was equipped with the T-55 tanks from raising till 2005. It converted to the T-90 main battle tanks in 2006.

== Operations ==
Indo-Pakistani War of 1971
The regiment within its first year of raising took part in the 1971 Indo-Pak war on the western front in the Dera Baba Nanak sector. It was under 14 (I) Armoured Brigade but was placed under command 86 Infantry Brigade commanded by Brigadier Gowri Shankar for Operations. It took park in 'Operation Akal' for the capture of the Dera Baba Nanak Enclave (Pakistani Jassar Enclave) along with 1/9 Gorkha Rifles, 10 Dogra and 17 Rajput. The regiment lost two officers, one JCO and six other ranks and won three gallantry awards.

Other operations
The regiment took part in Operation Trident in 1987, in Operation Rakshak between April 1990 and October 1991 and Operation Parakram.

== Achievements ==
The Regiment was presented the ‘President’s Standards’ on 16 December 1994 at Suratgarh by the then President of India Dr Shankar Dayal Sharma.

The Regiment had the honour of participating in the Republic Day parade in 1973 with a squadron of T-55 tanks and in 2008 with its newly acquired T-90 tanks.

The Regiment has the distinction of being the first to induct tanks into the high altitude areas (21,000 ft) of the Kareng Plateau in North Sikkim on the Tibetan Border in the year 1987.

== Regimental Insignia ==
The Regimental badge comprises two crossed lances with a tank superimposed in the centre, with numeral 71 placed above and a scroll at the base with the Regimental Motto in Devanagari script. The two lances signify the spirit of the cavalry and the tank represents the punch, which the Armoured Corps delivers in the battlefield.

The Regiment colours are Purple, Red and Gold – signifying Royalty, Valour and Purity respectively. The motto of the Regiment is शत्रुनाश (Shatrunash), which translates to ‘destruction of the enemy’.
