= Thakur Prithi Chand =

Indian Army officer (1911–2000)

Colonel Thakur Prithi Chand MVC
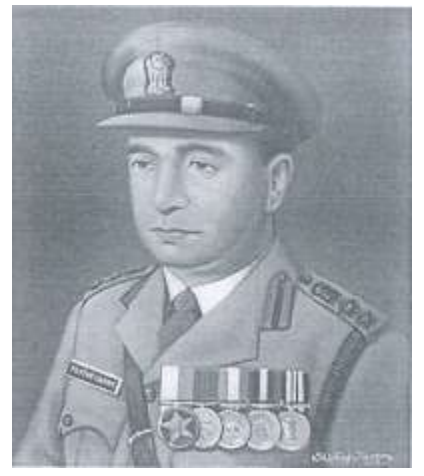
- Born: 1 January 1911; Rangri, Kullu district, Punjab Province, British India
- Died: 2000 (aged 89)
- Relatives: Lt. Col. Kushal Chand, MVC; Sub. Maj. and Hony Capt. Bhim Chand, VrC & bar
- Military career
- Allegiance: British India; India
- Branch: British Indian Army; Indian Army
- Rank: Colonel
- Service number: IEC - 787 or IEC - 8968
- Units: 2 Dogra; 7 J&K Militia; 3/11 Gorkha Regiment
- Conflicts: Indo-Pakistani War of 1947
- Awards: Maha Vir Chakra

Colonel Thakur Prithi Chand, MVC, (1 January 1911 - 2000) was an officer of the Indian Army. He is known for his significant role in stalling Pakistani advances in Ladakh during the Indo-Pakistan War of 1947-48. For his role in this war, Thakur Prithi Chand is regarded among the 'Saviours of Ladakh', alongside Kushal Chand, Bhim Chand, and Chewang Rinchen.

== Personal life ==
Prithi Chand was born in village Rangri near Manali. He was a scion of the house of Kolong, which during the British Raj ruled the mountainous tract of Lahaul in the Kangra district of Punjab Province. Prithi Chand was the third son of Thakur Amar Chand (d. 1921), the Wazir of Lahaul. Thakur Amar Chand had fought in Mesopotamia during World War I. For his services during the war, Thakur Amar Chand was given the title 'Rai Bahadur' by the British Raj. The Thakurs of Lahaul had strong bonds with Ladakh, as they married into the latter's royal family, and shared cultural, linguistic, and religious similarities.

Prithi Chand passed out of high school from Kullu in 1929, and did graduation from Shri Pratap College, Srinagar. However, with his elder brother Thakur Abhay Chand becoming mentally unhealthy in 1929, Prithi Chand soon had to leave his studies unfinished, and help in the waziri of Lahaul.

== Armed forces career ==
In 1933–34, Prithi Chand got recruited in the 11/17 Dogra Regiment. In 1936, he was appointed as Jamadar under the Viceroy's Commission. In 1939, Chand was promoted to 2nd Lieutenant through the King's Commission, into the 2nd Battalion of the Dogra Infantry Regiment in 1939.

There seems to be some confusion regarding Chand's service number. B. Chakravorty mentions it as IEC - 787, while the website of the Ministry of Defence, Government of India, mentions it as IEC - 8968.

=== Actions in Ladakh, 1948 ===
Thakur Prithi Chand played a key role in defending Ladakh during the Indo-Pakistan War of 1947–48. Between mid-February and early March 1948, under treacherous and extremely challenging winter conditions, Prithi Chand led a small volunteer group to Ladakh, which comprised Lahauli Buddhists serving in 2 Dogra. He was accompanied by his younger cousin Major Kushal Chand, and their uncle Subedar Bhim Chand, both of whom were also in 2 Dogra. Once in Ladakh, the trio raised local militias and conducted guerrilla warfare to thwart and repel invading Pakistani forces in that sector. For his actions, Major Thakur Prithi Chand was awarded the Maha Vir Chakra, independent India's second highest gallantry award, on 15 August 1948. In these actions, Khushal Chand was also awarded the Maha Vir Chakra, while Bhim Chand was awarded the Vir Chakra (India's third highest gallantry award) and bar.

==== Mahavir Chakra award ====
The Maha Vir Chakra citation for Thakur Prithi Chand reads as the following:

In February 1948, Major Thakur Prithi Chand of the 2nd Dogra Battalion volunteered to command a small force of 18 volunteers from the Indian Army in the Kashmir Valley to Leh to raise and train a militia force, and organise the defence of that area. He led this small band of brave men in mid-winter across Zoji La, a mountain pass at 11,000 feet, in snow blizzard and over 20 feet deep snow without any special snow or winter equipment. This in itself was an epic feat. On arrival at Leh, Major Prithi Chand took command of two platoons of J&K State Forces, and with his own men, hurriedly raised and trained some 200 militia. By May, the enemy had overrun most of Baltistan, captured Kargil and was advancing on Leh along the Indus and Nubra valleys. This young officer with little tactical knowledge or experience, but filled with intense patriotism and an indomitable spirit, held the enemy advance by adopting guerilla tactics. Covering a front extending over hundreds of miles, he organised raids and ambushes on the enemy, frequently leading them himself. Major Prithi Chand underwent extreme physical strain; he appeared everywhere. One day he was in the Indus valley and the next day or day after, he would be in the Nubra valley many miles away. He and his men lived mostly on sattu and with very little ammunition he kept the enemy at bay until reinforcements were sent to him by air. Posterity will sing the praises of Major Prithi Chand and of his small band of men for generations to come, and the people of Ladakh valley will always remember them as their saviors. Major Thakur Prithi Chand throughout these operations displayed exceptional leadership, courage and indomitable spirit in the highest traditions of the Indian Army.

=== Afterwards ===
Upon his promotion to the rank of Lieutenant Colonel in 1950, Chand was given the command of the 3rd Battalion of the 11th Gorkha Infantry Regiment, which he went on to hold for three years. He retired as a Colonel in 1962.

== Post-retirement ==
Thakur Prithi Chand was a Buddhist. After his retirement from the army, he served at one point as the president of the Himalayan Buddhist Society, Manali.
