= 17th Dogra Regiment =

British Indian Army infantry regiment (1922–1947)

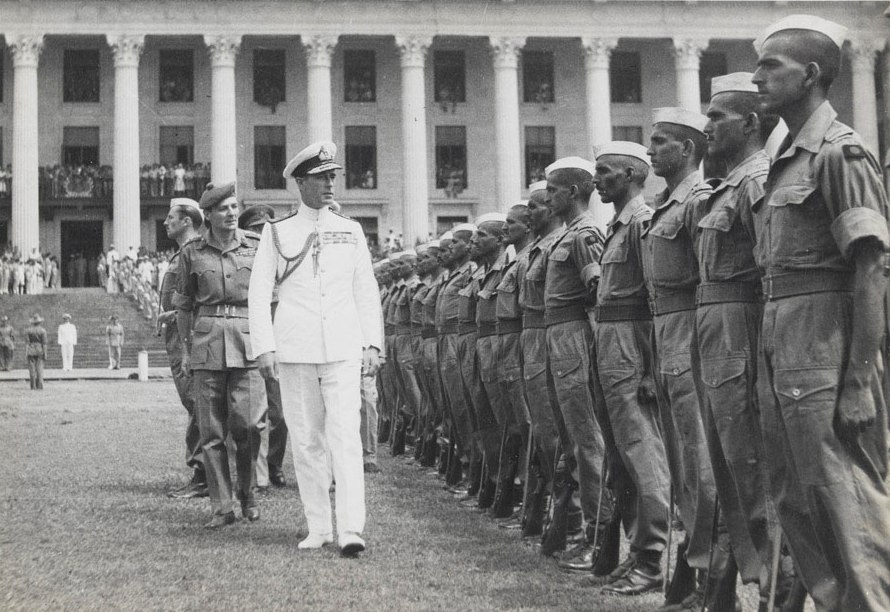
- Lord Mountbatten inspects the 17th Dogra on the Padang after the Japanese surrender at the Municipal Building building in Singapore, 1945
- Active: 1922–1947
- Country: British India
- Branch: British Indian Army
- Type: Infantry

The 17th Dogra Regiment was an infantry regiment of the British Indian Army. It was formed in 1922, after the Indian government decided to reform the army moving away from single battalion regiments to multi-battalion regiments.

During the Second World War, soldiers from the 17th Dogras fought in Malaya (1941-1942) and Burma (1943-1945).

After the partition of India in 1947, it was allocated to the Indian Army and renamed the Dogra Regiment.

== Formation ==
- 1st Battalion, formerly the 37th (Prince of Wales's Own) Dogras
- 2nd Battalion, formerly the 38th Dogras
- 3rd Battalion, formerly the 1st Battalion, 41st Dogras
- 10th (Training) Battalion, formerly the 2nd Battalion, 41st Dogras

== General sources ==
- Dogra Regiment on Bharat-Rakshak.com
- "17th Dogra Regiment". regiments.org. Archived from the original on 11 October 2007.
- Barthorp, Michael; Burn, Jeffrey (1979). Indian Infantry Regiments 1860–1914. Osprey Publishing. ISBN 0-85045-307-0.
- Sumner, Ian (2001). The Indian Army 1914––1947. Osprey Publishing. ISBN 1-84176-196-6.
