= Bhim Chand (soldier) =

Indian Army officer (born 1905)

Subedar Major and Honorary Captain Bhim Chand VrC & bar
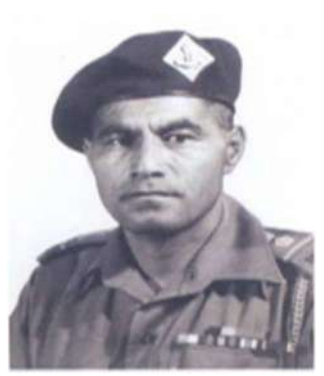
- Born: 17 December 1905
- Died: Unknown
- Relatives: Col. Thakur Prithi Chand, MVC; Lt. Col. Kushal Chand, MVC
- Military career
- Allegiance: British India; India
- Branch: British Indian Army; Indian Army
- Rank: Subedar Major Honorary Captain
- Service number: 14792 - IO
- Unit: 2 Dogra
- Conflicts: Indo-Pakistani War of 1947
- Awards: Vir Chakra (2); Jangi Inam

Subedar Major and Honorary Captain Bhim Chand, VrC & bar, (born 17 December 1905) was an officer of the Indian Army around the mid-20th century. He is known for his role in stalling the advance of the Pakistani forces in Ladakh during the Indo-Pakistan War of 1947-48. He is the only person in the Indian Army known for having been awarded a double award in this war. For his role in this war, Bhim Chand is regarded among the 'Saviours of Ladakh', alongside Thakur Prithi Chand, Kushal Chand, and Chewang Rinchen.

== Personal life ==
Bhim Chand hailed from Lahaul, then a part of the Kangra district of the Punjab Province of British India. His father was Phunchog Rabgai. He was a maternal uncle to Colonel Thakur Prithi Chand, MVC, and Lieutenant Colonel Kushal Chand, MVC, and fought alongside them in Ladakh during the 1947-48 war with Pakistan. Like all of them, Bhim Chand was a Tibetan Buddhist.

== Armed forces career ==
Bhim Chand joined the British Indian Army as a soldier in the 2nd Battalion of the Dogra Regiment, on 22 September 1939. He served in World War II over 1939–45, for which he received a 'Jangi Inam' from the British government on 15 January 1947.

He continued in 2 Dogra during the 1947-48 war. During this war, while at the JCO rank of Subedar, he was twice awarded the Vir Chakra - the third highest gallantry award in the post-Independence Indian Army. He retired with the honorary rank of Subedar Major and Honorary Captain, on December 1, 1958.

=== Actions in Ladakh, 1948 ===
In 1948, Bhim Chand was part of an all-volunteer group from the 2nd Dogras, led by Major Thakur Prithi Chand with Captain (later Major) Kushal Chand as second-in-command. Comprising around twenty men in total - all from Lahaul and all Buddhists - this group made its way to Ladakh in the thick of winter in February, arriving there by mid-March. The aim was to protect Ladakh from Pakistani invaders. Prithi Chand and Bhim Chand raised a militia of local volunteers in Nubra, called the 'Nubra Guards', of which Colonel Chewang Rinchen, MVC & bar, SM - then a 17-year old - became a member. Bhim Chand also played a vital role in the defence of Leh, the capital of Ladakh.

==== Vir Chakra awards ====
The first Vir Chakra citation for Subedar Bhim Chand, dated 23 August 1948, reads as the following:

During the operation against Pakistan in August 1948, Sub Bhim Chand was ordered to recapture Lasringmo at a height of 18,500 ft. He appeared in the rear of the enemy position after a strenuous night march in extremely difficult most inhospitable terrain. He destroyed enemy ammunition and ordinance dumps. His successful attack resulted in the route of enemy who left behind many dead and one prisoner. In October, he destroyed 3.7 mch Howitzer at Basgo. In November, again he destroyed big enemy ammunition at Lamayuru. This JCO displayed gallantry, grit and calmness of the highest degree. He lived up to the highest traditions of his Regiment.

The second Vir Chakra citation of Subedar Bhim Chand, dated 27 December 1948, reads as the following:

Subedar BHIM CHAND was ordered to take out a Guerilla platoon and capture the last enemy positions in LEH Tehsil. To reach his objective he had to use ropes, picks and shovels on the way and had to cross snow covered peaks 22,000 ft. high. His platoon suffered 50 per cent. casualties from frost bite, but Subedar BHIM CHAND was confident and determined to fulfil his mission. Finally on 27 Dec. 1948 he made a surprise attack and captured enemy positions. The enemy ran away leaving behind six dead, three rifles, bren magazines, blankets and other stores. In this action the JCO showed great power of endurance, devotion to duty, magnificent capacity to organize and extraordinary determination to win his objective.
