= Kushal Chand =

Indian Army officer (1919–1953)

Lieutenant-Colonel Kushal Chand MVC
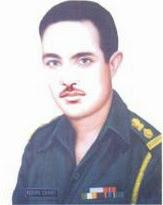
- Born: 26 September 1919; Lahaul, Kangra district, Punjab Province, British India
- Died: 9 April 1957 (aged 37); Near Sam Neuam, Laos
- Relatives: Col. Thakur Prithi Chand, MVC; Sub. Maj. and Hony Capt. Bhim Chand, VrC & bar
- Military career
- Allegiance: British India; India
- Branch: British Indian Army; Indian Army
- Rank: Lieutenant Colonel
- Service number: IEC - 9090
- Units: 2 Dogra; 7 J&K Militia; 9 Dogra
- Conflicts: Indo-Pakistani War of 1947
- Awards: Maha Vir Chakra
- Other work: Indian Member, International Armistice Commission for Indochina

Lieutenant Colonel Kushal Chand, MVC, (26 September 1919 – 9 April 1957; also spelled Khushal Chand) was an officer of the Indian Army. He is known for his significant role in stalling the progress of Pakistani forces into Ladakh, during the Indo-Pakistan War of 1947-48. For his role in this war, Thakur Kushal Chand is regarded among the 'Saviours of Ladakh', alongside Thakur Prithi Chand, Bhim Chand, and Chewang Rinchen.

== Personal life ==
Kushal Chand was born into the house of Kolong, the ruling family of the mountainous tract of Lahaul, which then lay in the Kangra district of the Punjab Province, British India. His place of birth was the Gemoor Khar ('Khar' meaning 'palace') in Lahaul. He was the elder son of Thakur Mangal Chand (1886 -1969), the younger brother of Rai Bahadur Thakur Amar Chand. After the death of Thakur Amar Chand, Thakur Mangal Chand served as the Wazir of Lahaul from 1921 till the time Thakur Pratap Chand, his nephew and a son of Thakur Amar Chand, attained maturity.

Kushal Chand's younger brother was Nihal Chand, a politician and the husband of Lata Thakur, one-time MLA from the Lahaul and Spiti assembly constituency.

Kushal Chand was survived by two sons and a daughter. One of the sons is the retired senior IAS officer, Ashok Thakur.

== Armed forces career ==
=== Actions in Ladakh, 1948 ===
Kushal Chand was a younger cousin to Thakur Prithi Chand, the third son of Thakur Amar Chand. Bhim Chand was a maternal uncle to both Prithi Chand and Kushal Chand. All three belonged to the 2nd Battalion of the Dogra Regiment. Kushal Chand was commissioned into this unit on 15 September 1941. In the Indo-Pakistan War of 1947–48, all three made their way together to Ladakh, as members of a small volunteer group of Lahauli Buddhists from 2 Dogra, so to defend Ladakh from Pakistani invaders. All three fought and led with distinction, and received high decorations individually. Kushal Chand was second-in-command of this group, which was led by Thakur Prithi Chand. For his actions in Ladakh, Kushal Chand was awarded the Maha Vir Chakra, the second-highest gallantry award of India.

==== Maha Vir Chakra award ====
The Maha Vir Chakra citation for Major Kushal Chand, dated 26 January 1950, reads as the following:

Major Kushal Chand in February 1948 was one of the two officers, who volunteered to go to Leh to help in raising a local militia force and to organise and conduct the defence of the Ladakh valley. For four months, this young officer, with just a platoon of J&K state forces, and 20 Dogra volunteers, hastily trained and delayed the enemy advance south towards Leh along the Indus valley. Major Kushal Chand fearlessly conducted guerrilla warfare of a skilful nature giving an impression to the enemy that he had many more men than he actually had. On one occasion, he held the Khaltsi Bridge for 24 hours with just himself and his buddy. At night, covered by his buddy, who kept firing on the opposite bank, Major Chand crawled down to the bridge and set it on fire. This delayed the enemy's advance for another week. Having no communications with Leh, Major Kushal Chand, at great risks, had to make frequent visits there to keep his commander in picture, as also to receive further instructions. Throughout these operations, without proper ration, without artillery support and with acute shortage of ammunition, Major Kushal Chand led his small band with vigour and skill, and by his personal daredevilry, carried out the given task successfully. He thus maintained the high traditions of the Indian Army and set a fine example to those serving under him.

=== Afterwards ===
In 1953, upon his promotion to the rank of Lt. Col., Kushal Chand was given the command 9th Dogra Infantry Battalion, which he held for three years. Thereafter he was deputed to serve on the UN mission in Indochina, as an Indian member of the International Armistice Commission for Indochina.

== Death ==
On 9 April 1957, a light aeroplane of the Laos Air Service carrying Kushal Chand and two others crashed in Laos, killing all on board.

== Memorials ==
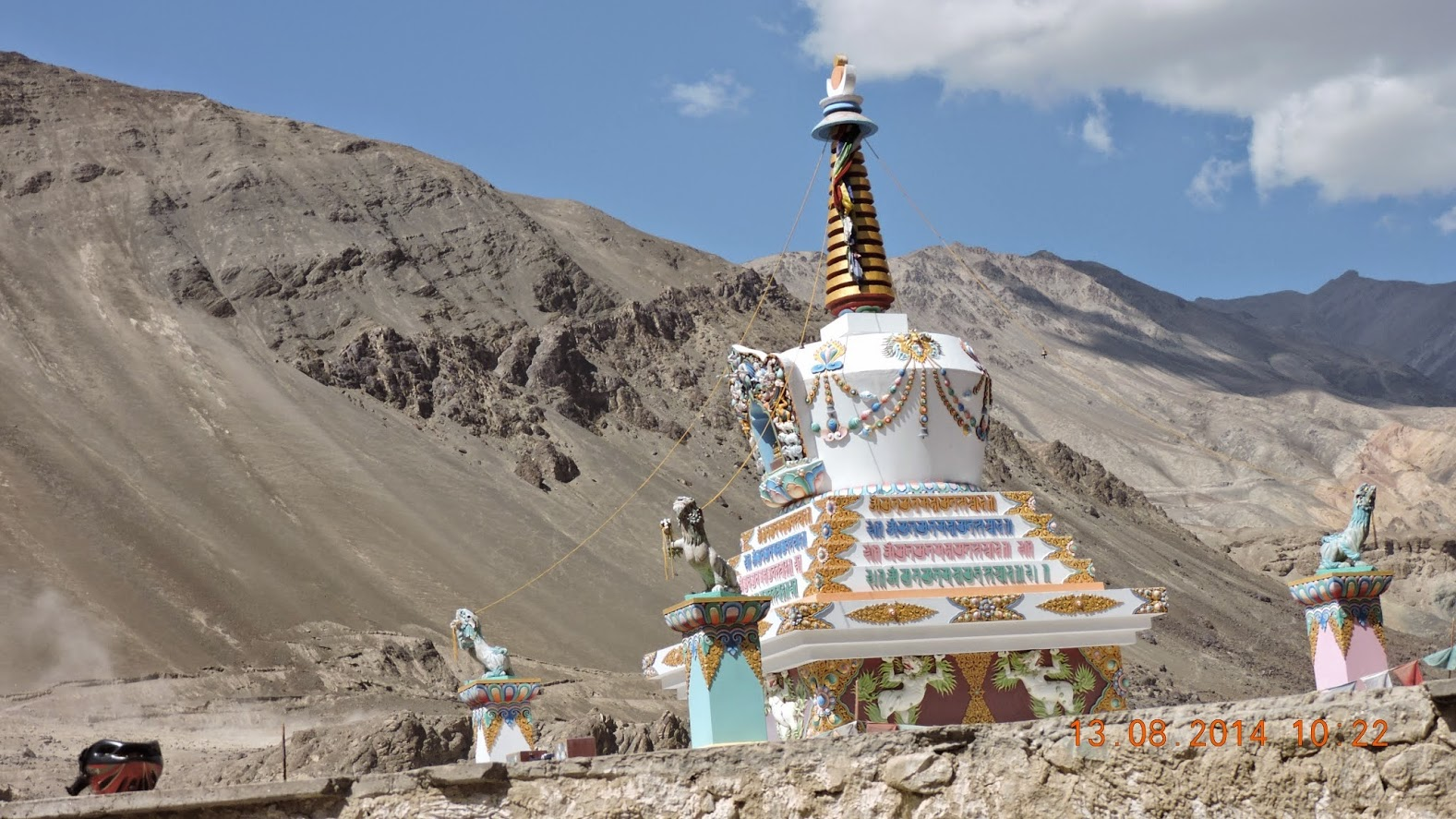
The memorial stupa in honour of Lt. Col. Kushal Chand, MVC, located near the Khaltse bridge in Ladakh.

- Kushal Chand's son Ashok Thakur, IAS, got a 'chorten' (Buddhist reliquary) constructed at the Khaltse bridge as a memorial to his father. The Khalatse bridge had been the site of one of major battles fought by Kushal Chand in Ladakh. The chorten was unveiled by the 14th Dalai Lama on his visit to Ladakh in 2012.
- In April 2019, Kushal Chand's uniform, original MVC medal, service and miniature medals were presented by his family members to Lt. Gen. Ranbir Singh, then GOC-in-C Northern Command, so as to be preserved at the Indian Army's Hall of Fame in Leh, Ladakh.
