= 38th Dogras =

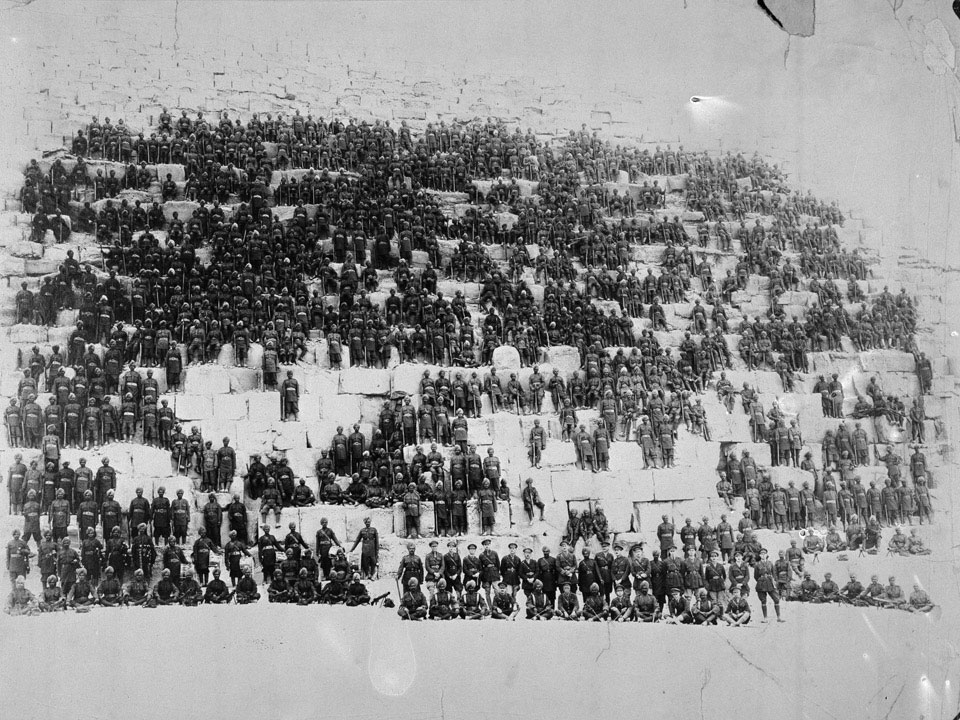
- 38th Dogras on the Great Pyramid in Giza, Egypt, 1918.
- Active: 1858–1922
- Country: Indian Empire
- Branch: Army
- Type: Infantry
- Part of: Bengal Army (to 1895); Bengal Command
- Uniform: Red; faced dark blue, 1892 yellow
- Engagements: Punjab Frontier; Siege of Malakand

The 38th Dogras were an infantry regiment of the British Indian Army. They could trace their origins to 1858, when they were raised as an irregular unit named the Agra Levy. In 1864 the regiment was incorporated into the regular line infantry of the Bengal Army, under the title of the 38th (Agra) Regiment Bengal Native Infantry.

The regiment served at the Siege of Malakand in 1897. To honour the visit of the Prince and Princess of Wales to India, they took part in the Rawalpindi Parade 1905.

In August 1914 the regiment, then comprising eight companies of Dogras, was stationed at Malakand on the North West Frontier. The 38th Dogras remained in India until late 1917, when it was posted to Aden and then to Suez. The regiment saw active service against the Ottoman Turks at the Battle of Megiddo in September 1918. It remained in Egypt performing garrison duties through 1920, before returning to India.

After World War I the Indian government reformed the army moving from single battalion regiments to multi battalion regiments. In 1922, the 38th Dogras became the 2nd Battalion, 17th Dogra Regiment. In 1947, the regiment was allocated to the new Indian Army on independence.

== Predecessor names ==
- 1864: 38th (Agra) Regiment BNI
- 1890: 38th (Dogra) Regiment, Bengal Infantry
- 1901: 38th Dogra Infantry.

== Untitled ==
- Barthorp, Michael; Burn, Jeffrey (1979). Indian infantry regiments 1860–1914. Osprey Publishing. ISBN 0-85045-307-0.
- Sumner, Ian (2001). The Indian Army 1914–1947. Osprey Publishing. ISBN 1-84176-196-6.
