= 15 Medium Regiment (India) =

Indian Army artillery unit

- Active: 1956–present
- Country: India
- Allegiance: India
- Branch: Indian Army
- Type: Artillery
- Size: Regiment
- Nickname(s): Batalik bombers
- Motto(s): Sarvatra, Izzat-O-Iqbal (Everywhere with Honour and Glory)
- Colors: Red & Navy Blue
- Anniversaries: 14 May – Raising Day
- Equipment: 130 mm towed field gun

Insignia
- Abbreviation: 15 Med Regt

15 Medium Regiment is part of the Regiment of Artillery of the Indian Army.

== Formation and history ==
The regiment was raised on 14 May 1956 with a nucleus of troops from the 15 Dogra Regiment, which itself had been raised after the partition on 15 July 1948 from Dogra companies from 1/16 Punjab, 2 Frontier Force and 3 Frontier Force, 4th Division of 13 Frontier Force Rifles and the 2nd, 3rd and 5th Baluch Regiments. It thus became the first Dogra field regiment of the Regiment of Artillery. The new unit was raised outside Golconda Fort, Hyderabad as 15 Field Regiment. The first commanding officer was Lieutenant Colonel M G Luxa. The unit was initially equipped with 25-pounder guns and received its first consignment of twelve guns on 9 August 1956.

It was subsequently converted to a medium regiment and consists of headquarters, 101, 102 and 103 medium batteries.

== Class composition ==
The regiment is a single class regiment with Dogra troops.

== Operations ==
The regiment has taken part in the following operations:

Sino-Indian War

The regiment moved to Siliguri on 1 November 1962 and deployed its guns above 13,000 feet. It was in direct support to 66 Infantry Brigade (20 Infantry Division) during the operations and was deployed in the area north of Gangtok.

Indo-Pakistani War of 1971

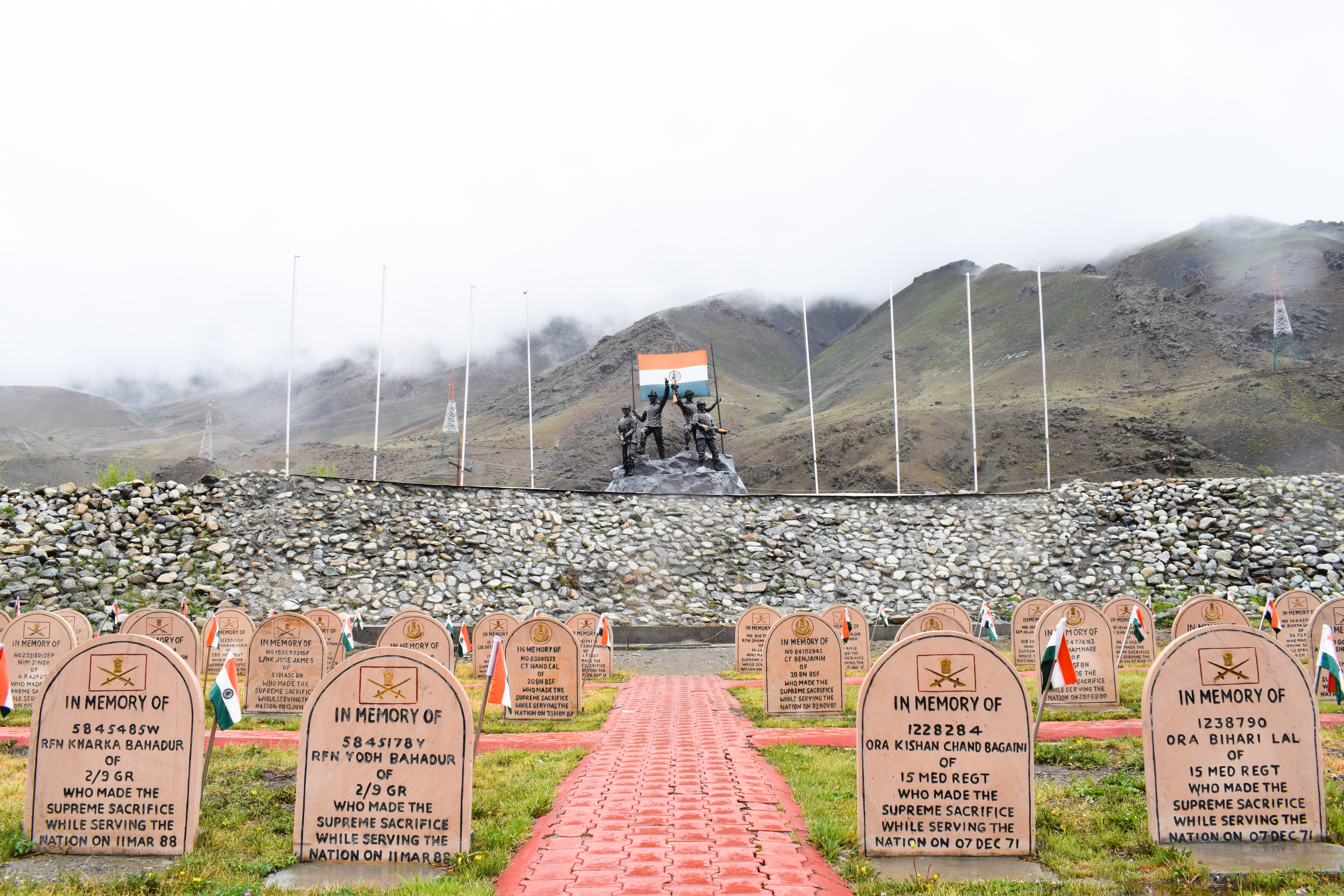
Kargil war memorial with names of soldiers from the regiment killed in the 1971 war

The regiment was deployed in Rajasthan in the Foxtort sector during Operation Cactus Lily. This sector did not see any significant action. 101 Field Battery of the regiment was in support of 121 (Independent) Infantry Brigade Group in the Kargil sector of Jammu and Kashmir. On 7 December 1971, it gave artillery support to 2/11 Gorkha Rifles during the capture of Pakistani post 12 (No 185859), which was located at a height of 14,350 feet, east of Shingo River. It supported 18 Punjab during the capture of Brachil Pass, located at a height of 14,000 feet. The regiment lost Operator Bihari Lal and Operator Kishan Chand Bagani to Pakistani shelling on 7 December 1971. Regimental Havildar Major Nand Lal was awarded the Sena Medal.

Operation Vijay

The regiment was equipped with 105 mm field guns. It was initially deployed at Drass. The unit less one battery was moved to Batalik-Yaldor sector after detection of Pakistani infiltrators; with the 103 Field Battery staying put at Drass. The regiment was deployed under 70 Infantry Brigade under 3 Infantry Division. Later during the war, the unit less 103 battery was deployed in Dah. 101 Field Battery saw action in Turtuk. The regiment fired 41,435 rounds during the entire operation and earned the sobriquet of Batalik Bombers. It lost Lance Havildar Gurdas Singh and Gunner Yashwant Singh to enemy fire to its gun positions.

The unit won the following gallantry awards during the battle -

- GOC-in-C (Northern Command) Unit Appreciation
- Yudh Seva Medal – Colonel Sanjay Saran
- Sena Medals – Major Gurpreet Singh, Major Rahul Ohri, Captain Rakesh Tiwari, Subedar Padam Nabh
- Mentioned in dispatches – 4
- COAS Commendation Cards – 4
- GOC-in-C (Northern Command) Commendation Cards – 10

Operation Parakram

The regiment was deployed in Suratgarh and Ganganagar sectors during the prolonged stand-off with Pakistan.

== Honours and achievements ==
- The regiment took part in the artillery fire power demonstration on 17 April 1958 in honour of the first president of India, Dr Rajendra Prasad.
- The regiment had the honour to participate in the Republic Day Parade in 1989 with its 105 mm guns.

== See also ==
- List of artillery regiments of Indian Army
