= 41st Dogras =

- Active: 1900-1922
- Country: British Raj
- Branch: Army
- Type: Infantry
- Part of: British Indian Army
- Colors: Scarlet; faced yellow

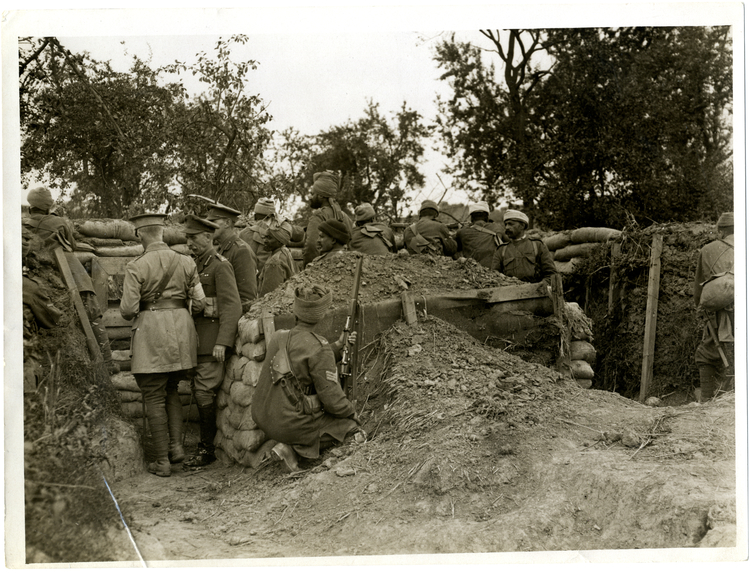

The 41st Dogras was an infantry regiment of the British Indian Army. The regiment was raised as the 41st (Dogra) Bengal Infantry in 1900 in Jullundur by Major E.T. Gastrell.

In 1901, the regiment became the 41st Dogra Infantry; and in 1903 the 41st Dogras.

They went to China in 1904 to join an international force, staying there until 1908.

== World War I ==
In July 1914, the regiment was stationed at Bareilly, having arrived from Cawnpore on 6 November 1912. It comprised eight companies of Dogras.

During the war, the regiment served in Western Front in France from 9 August 1914 to 31 August 1915 as a part of the 21st Bareilly Infantry Brigade of the 7th (Meerut) Division.

From 20 September to 30 November 1915, the regiment served with the 22nd Indian Infantry Brigade in defence of the Suez Canal.

From 1 December to 31 January 1916, the regiment again formed a part of the 21st Indian Infantry Brigade of the 7th (Meerut) Division and served in Mesopotamia. The regiment was involved in the Battle of Sheikh Sa'ad, the Battle of Wadi and the Battle of Hanna as the British tried to break the Siege of Kut. From 1 February to 8 July 1916, the regiment was a part of the 35th Indian Infantry Brigade of the 14th Indian Division.

== Second battalion and Third Anglo-Afghan War ==
A 2nd Battalion 41st Dogras raised of the regiment was raised on 16 October 1917 at Jubbulpore. The battalion arrived in Sialkot on 12 March 1918 where it remained until the Third Anglo-Afghan War. The battalion served as a part of the 45th Infantry Brigade, 16th Indian Division during the war. In October 1919, the battalion and its depot moved to Lahore where it received orders to mobilise for service in Waziristan on 20 January 1920. The battalion served in Jandola, Chagmalai, Wana, Zerai and Dargai as a part of the Waziristan Force October 1920 and December 1921. The battalion returned to Jullundur on 17 December 1921.

It became the 10th Battalion 17th Dogra Regiment, a training battalion, on 1 March after the 1922 amalgamation of the 41st Dogras into the 17th Dogra Regiment.

== Amalgamation ==
In the post-war reforms, the British Raj moved from single battalion regiment to multi battalion regiments. In 1922, the 41st Dogras became the 3rd and 10th Battalions of the 17th Dogra Regiment. This regiment would be allocated to the Indian Army during the Partition of India.

== Predecessor names ==
- 41st (Dogra) Bengal Infantry - 1900
- 41st Dogra Infantry - 1901
- 41st Dogras - 1903

== Sources ==
- Barthorp, Michael; Burn, Jeffrey (1979). Indian infantry regiments 1860-1914. Osprey Publishing. ISBN 0-85045-307-0.
- Sumner, Ian (2001). The Indian Army 1914-1947. Osprey Publishing. ISBN 1-84176-196-6.
- Moberly, Frederick James (1927) [1923]. The Campaign in Mesopotamia 1914–1918. History of the Great War Based on Official Documents. Vol. I. London: HMSO. OCLC 772784341.
